= List of Guy's Grocery Games episodes =

Guy's Grocery Games is a reality competition television series hosted by Guy Fieri which airs on the Food Network. The basic premise of the show is that chefs must cook using ingredients found in a typical supermarket. Although most episodes are one-offs, the series periodically features in-season mini tournaments.

== Series overview ==
Season	Episodes	Originally released	
Season	Episodes	First released	Last released
1	12	October 20, 2013	January 19, 2014
2	11	May 11, 2014	July 20, 2014
3	15	July 27, 2014	December 14, 2014
4	16	January 4, 2015	April 26, 2015
5	10	May 3, 2015	July 5, 2015
6	12	July 12, 2015	September 27, 2015
7	14	October 4, 2015	December 27, 2015
8	11	January 3, 2016	March 13, 2016
9	12	March 20, 2016	June 26, 2016
10	12	July 3, 2016	July 12, 2016
11	15	October 2, 2016	December 25, 2016
12	15	January 2, 2017	April 9, 2017
13	11	April 23, 2017	July 16, 2017
14	10	July 23, 2017	October 8, 2017
15	11	October 15, 2017	January 7, 2018
16	15	January 14, 2018	March 11, 2018
17	15	February 28, 2018	May 13, 2018
18	21	May 16, 2018	October 3, 2018
19	19	September 26, 2018	February 20, 2019
20	26	December 23, 2018	August 4, 2019
21	17	August 21, 2019	November 6, 2019
22	13	November 13, 2019	January 29, 2020
23	12	February 5, 2019	April 15, 2020
24	15	April 22, 2020	August 5, 2020
25	24	August 12, 2020	January 27, 2021
26	17	February 17, 2021	June 30, 2021
27	13	July 7, 2021	September 22, 2021
28	8	September 29, 2021	December 15, 2021
29	14	January 5, 2022	May 11, 2022
30	12	May 25, 2022	October 5, 2022
31	9	November 16, 2022	February 1, 2023
32	11	February 8, 2023	May 24, 2023
33	10	June 7, 2023	August 9, 2023
34	12	August 16, 2023	November 1, 2023
35	11	November 8, 2023	January 31, 2024
36	12	February 21, 2024	April 24, 2024
37	11	September 4, 2024	October 30, 2024
38	10	January 8, 2025	March 12, 2025
39	11	March 26, 2025	June 4, 2025
40	13	June 18, 2025	September 25, 2025
41	5	January 21, 2026	February 25, 2026
42	13	June 10, 2026	2026

== Episodes ==
=== Season 1 (2013–14) ===
No. overall	No. in season	Title	Original release date
1	1	"Wild In The Aisles"	October 20, 2013
Round 1: Spaghetti & Meatballs – Out of Stock (no pasta, no ground beef): Eliminated 1st: Karen Forsberg; Round 2: Family Meal for 4 – Budget Battle ($6.35): Eliminated 2nd: Nia Pullinzi; Round 3: Make Your Best Dish – Frozen Food Feud: Eliminated 3rd: Stanley Hagerman; Winner: Tom Ramsey ($16,000) Judges: Melissa d'Arabian, Troy Johnson, Lorena Garcia
2	2	"Frozen Feats"	October 27, 2013
Round 1: Asian Stir Fry – 5 Ingredients Or Less: Eliminated 1st: Natalie Romero; Round 2: Fun Family Meal – (Eggo® Homestyle waffles, something sweet, something over $4, a protein, something spicy, something green, something under $2) – Grocery List: Eliminated 2nd: Monica Smith; Round 3: Decadent Pasta – Closing Time (with a Culinary Quiz): Eliminated 3rd: Nick Wilson; Winner: Kris "Plum" Plummer ($14,000) Notes: Round 2 featured a name brand product (Eggo waffles) which denote it as a possible sponsor of the show. Round 3 had the first Culinary Quiz of the series. For winning the culinary quiz, Nick's advantage was a 15-second head start in the third round. Judges: Melissa d'Arabian, Beau MacMillan, Jet Tila
3	3	"The Ol' Switcheroo"	November 3, 2013
Round 1: Gourmet Salad – Out of Stock (no lettuce/leafy greens): Eliminated 1st: Greg Akahoshi; Round 2: Decadent Burger – Budget Battle ($7.96) & Culinary Quiz: Eliminated 2nd: Jessica Swift; Round 3: Comfort Meal – Mixed Bag: Eliminated 3rd: Lenny McNab; Winner: Cristina Topham ($20,000) Notes: Cristina won the Culinary Quiz in the second round and her advantage was an extra 50¢. In the third round, the contestants had 4 minutes to shop with regular sized grocery canvas bags instead of carts (though it wasn't identified as game) and then had the series' first version of a "swap" game (a bag swap). Judges: Catherine McCord, Troy Johnson, Richard Blais
4	4	"Surf's Up"	November 10, 2013
Round 1: Surf & Turf – Can Can (+1 produce & +1 dairy): Eliminated 1st: Keith Obarski; Round 2: Soup & Sandwich – No Carts Allowed: Eliminated 2nd: Dayna McLeod; Round 3: Steakhouse Dinner – Grocery List (bone-in protein, something green, a starch, a dairy product, onion family, a boxed item, a vegetable): Eliminated 3rd: Shawn Davis; Winner: Geo Ketchedjian ($8,000) Notes: In round 1, the contestants were allowed to get one item from produce and one item from dairy. Judges: Melissa d'Arabian, Troy Johnson, Lorena Garcia
5	5	"Feisty Fiesta"	November 17, 2013
Round 1: Frozen Food Feud (+2 produce) – Best Seafood Dish: Eliminated 1st: Philippa Sklaar; Round 2: Mexican Fiesta Dish – (Kikkoman soy sauce, something green, jarred pickled vegetable, a protein, a corn product, something red, a dairy product) – Grocery List & Culinary Quiz: Eliminated 2nd: Marcel Cocit; Round 3: Breakfast Club – No Carts Allowed: Eliminated 3rd: Cassy Pugh; Winner: Samuel Monsour ($20,000) Notes: In round 1, the contestants were allowed 2 items from the produce department. Samuel won the Culinary Quiz in round 2 so his advantage was a one-minute head start. Judges: Jet Tila, Troy Johnson, Lorena Garcia
6	6	"Cart Your Engines"	November 24, 2013
Round 1: International Dish – 5 Items or Less: Eliminated 1st: Celeste Gill; Round 2: Best Dish – Single Aisle Showdown (Aisle 4) & Culinary Quiz: Eliminated 2nd: Chris Tzorin; Round 3: Steak and Potatoes – Out of Stock (no steak, no potatoes): Eliminated 3rd: Eric Tonpis; Winner: Jill Sharpe ($16,000) Notes: The "5 items or less" game in round 1 (which has a different name from episode 2) is essentially the precursor to the game "Express Lane". In round 2, Jill won the culinary quiz so her advantage was getting 1 item from anywhere else in the store. Judges: Marcela Valladolid, Beau MacMillan, Catherine McCord
7	7	"It's Egg-cellent"	December 1, 2013
Round 1: Best Egg Dish – Grocery List (cage-free eggs, protein, can of olives, something green, bread, something crunchy, something spicy): Eliminated 1st: Lori Hill; Round 2: Dinner Party for Four – Culinary Quiz & Budget Battle ($7.83): Eliminated 2nd: Chris Bales; Round 3: Sandwich & Side – Mixed Bag: Eliminated 3rd: Stephan Germanaud; Winner: Luca Paris ($14,000) Notes: Chris Bales was the first contestant on the show to use a wheelchair. In the second round, Stephan won the culinary quiz so his advantage was an extra $1. Judges: Melissa d'Arabian, Troy Johnson, Catherine McCord
8	8	"Five Star Frozen Feud"	December 8, 2013
Round 1: Five Star Dinner – Frozen Food Feud: Eliminated 1st: Lisa Stalvey; Round 2: Healthy Kids Meal – Culinary Quiz & No Carts Allowed: Eliminated 2nd: Timothy Abell; Round 3: Savory Pie – Closing Time (3 minutes): Eliminated 3rd: Lisa Gauntt; Winner: Mark Curry ($16,000) Notes: In the second round, Timothy won the Culinary Quiz so his advantage was being able to get one item from anywhere in the store. Judges: Melissa d'Arabian, Richard Blais, Beau MacMillan
9	9	"Holly, Jolly Meals"	December 15, 2013
Round 1: Elevated Grilled Cheese – Budget Battle ($6.97): Eliminated 1st: Amy Barnes; Round 2: Unusual Dessert – Culinary Quiz & Single Aisle Showdown (aisle 9): Eliminated 2nd: Jason Febres; Round 3: Holiday Meal – Mixed Bag/Bag Swap: Eliminated 3rd: Aram Reed; Winner: Claud Beltran ($21,000) Notes: Aram's culinary quiz advantage was being able to get 1 extra item. Round 3 was the only round with a holiday slant (despite the festive episode title) and the game formerly called "Mixed Bag" was called "Bag Swap" in this episode, though it still retains the same rules as "Mixed Bag" (giving contestants a short amount of time to shop with only a canvas bag). In this episode only, there was a special gift box that could be picked up during the shopping spree for an additional $5,000, bringing the potential total prize to $25,000. Judges: Melissa d'Arabian, Troy Johnson, Richard Blais
10	10	"Game Day Rush"	January 5, 2014
Round 1: Game Day Feast – Closing Time (2 minutes): Eliminated 1st: Tal Sims; Round 2: Best Dish – Culinary Quiz & Single Aisle Showdown (aisle 1): Eliminated 2nd: Adela Jung; Round 3: Upscale Chicken Dinner – 5 Items or Less: Eliminated 3rd: David Aflalo; Winner: Phillip Frankland Lee ($16,000) Notes: Adela won the culinary quiz so her advantage was getting to choose one item from the dairy section. In the third-round game, the chefs were provided chicken which didn't count toward their 5-item limit. Judges: Richard Blais, D.C. Crenshaw, Catherine McCord
11	11	"Yes, Chefs Can"	January 12, 2014
Round 1: Italian Feast – Can Can (+1 aisle 9 product, +1 fresh herb): Eliminated 1st: Quiana Jeffries; Round 2: Ultimate Hot Dog – Culinary Quiz & Closing Time (2 minutes): Eliminated 2nd: Daniel Vercher; Round 3: Best Rice Dish – Grocery List (rice, boxed stock, bell pepper, protein, alcohol, something spicy, scallions): Eliminated 3rd: Kristina White; Winner: Shane Miller ($18,000) Notes: The chefs were allowed 2 non-canned items in the first round. For winning the Culinary Quiz in round 2, Kristina got a 15-second head start advantage. Judges: Melissa d'Arabian, D.C. Crenshaw, Catherine McCord
12	12	"Cart Wars!"	January 19, 2014
Round 1: Taco Night Feast – Out of Stock (no tortillas, no ground beef): Eliminated 1st: Justine Cowan; Round 2: Sandwich – Culinary Quiz & Frozen Food Feud: Eliminated 2nd: Lisa Vigil; Round 3: Best Seafood Dish – 5 Items or Less (+ 2 items): Eliminated 3rd: David Blonsky; Winner: Jay Kean ($12,000) Notes: Jay suffered a deep cut in the first round and opted to tape up his wound rather than leaving the competition to get stitches. Jay won the culinary quiz so his advantage was getting 1 extra item from the store. In the final round, Guy wheeled out a small rack with random food items and offered the two chefs a choice of two additional items each. Judges: Melissa d'Arabian, Richard Blais, Beau MacMillan

=== Season 2 (2014) ===
From this season forward, the show moved filming to a new, specially built supermarket set located in a warehouse in Santa Rosa, California. This season included episodes that were produced during Season 3 production but carried over to this season.

No. overall	No. in season	Title	Original release date
13	1	"Moms Know Best"	May 11, 2014
Round 1: Best Dish – ABC Game ("B"): Eliminated 1st: Deanna Ruppelli; Round 2: Brunch for Four – Grocery Pictogram & Budget Battle ($7.08): Eliminated 2nd: Tiffany Gray; Round 3: Guilty Pleasure Entree – Culinary Quiz & 4 Minute Shop & Cart Swap: Eliminated 3rd: Sherry Schie; Winner: Marla Ortega ($18,000) Notes: All competing chefs were mothers and Guy brought in his mother, Penny, to introduce the first game. This episode was the first to have 2 culinary quizzes. Marla won the round 2 culinary quiz and her advantage was an extra $1. Then she got the round 3 culinary quiz correct and her advantage was 1 extra item from anywhere in the store. Judges: Melissa d'Arabian, Troy Johnson, Catherine McCord
14	2	"Caught in the Middle"	May 18, 2014
Round 1: International Dish – Know Your Varieties & Meals from the Middle: Eliminated 1st: Daniella Malfitano; Round 2: Best Seafood Dish – Grocery Pictogram & 5 Ingredients or Less: Eliminated 2nd: Ghazwan Alsharif; Round 3: Signature Burger – Out of Stock (no ground meat): Eliminated 3rd: Luke Reyes; Winner: Kirsten Helle ($16,000) Notes: This is the first time a "culinary quiz" was presented in round 1. Daniella won the round 1 quiz so her advantage was 1 extra item from anywhere in the store. Ghazwan won the round 2 culinary quiz and his advantage was 1 extra grocery item. Judges: Melissa d'Arabian, Troy Johnson, Aida Mollenkamp
15	3	"Grocery Grillin'"	May 25, 2014
Round 1: Grill Pizza – Red Light Special (peanut butter): Eliminated 1st: Jamie McDonald; Round 2: Best Dish – Grocery Pictogram & Clearance Carts: Eliminated 2nd: Leila Armas; Round 3: On the Bone Dish – Culinary Quiz & Top Shelf/Bottom Shelf (top shelf): Eliminated 3rd: Kevin Naderi; Winner: Aaron Deal ($20,000) Notes: The theme of this episode was grilling in every round. Aaron won the round 2 culinary quiz and his advantage was a 15-second head start. Kevin won the round 3 culinary quiz and his advantage was 1 extra item from anywhere in the store. Judges: Troy Johnson, Richard Blais, Aarti Sequeira
16	4	"Next Food Network Stars Take Over Flavortown"	June 1, 2014
Round 1: Lunchtime Favorite – 5 Ingredients or Less: Eliminated 1st: Justin Warner (Bed-Stuy Campaign Against Hunger -$3,500); Round 2: Steakhouse Dinner – Grocery Pictogram & Budget Battle ($9.99): Eliminated 2nd: Melissa D'Arabian (American Foundation for Suicide Prevention – $3,500); Round 3: Best Dish – Word & One Ingredient Per Aisle: Eliminated 3rd: Jeff Mauro (Hephzibah Children's Association – $3,500); Winner: Aaron McCargo Jr. (Play to Win – $20,000) Notes: The chefs were all winners of "The Next Food Network Star" and were playing for their charity of choice. For winning the culinary quiz in round 2, Aaron got an extra $1 towards his budget. Jeff won the culinary quiz in round 3 so his advantage was being able to get rid of an ingredient he didn't want to use. Guy donated $3,500 to the charities of each of the eliminated chefs. Judges: Judy Joo, Troy Johnson, Catherine McCord
17	5	"Cut the Cheese"	June 8, 2014
Round 1: Best Mac & Cheese Dish – Aisle Down (cheese dept.): Eliminated 1st: Connie Ruel; Round 2: Chicken Dinner – Watch Your Weight (6 lbs.): Eliminated 2nd: Kermit Griffin; Round 3: Romantic Meal – Word & Cart Swap: Eliminated 3rd: Mika Leon; Winner: Salvatore Boscarello ($18,000) Notes: For the first time, no one was able to answer the culinary quiz (in round 3) so Guy told them the answer and even sent his son, Ryder, to show them where the correct grocery item was. Mika brought it back to Guy the fastest so her advantage was being able to get 1 additional ingredient. Judges: Beau MacMillan, Brian Malarkey, Aarti Sequeira
18	6	"Free Samples"	June 15, 2014
Round 1: Mediterranean Dish – Keep It Sample (sliders, pickles, bologna, or meatballs): Eliminated 1st: William "Chazz" Hyman; Round 2: Dessert – Culinary Close Up & Closing Time (90 seconds): Eliminated 2nd: Erin French; Round 3: Best Dish – Food Wheel (whole chicken & aisle 4): Eliminated 3rd: Guy Wiener; Winner: Tanya Solomon ($20,000) Notes: The first version of "Keep It Sample" appeared in this episode and the rules were that 1 ingredient would be allowed per person on a first-come, first-served basis. Tanya won the round 2 culinary quiz and her advantage was being able to get 1 extra ingredient. Judges: Melissa d'Arabian, Beau MacMillan, G. Garvin
19	7	"Marshmallow Madness"	June 22, 2014
Round 1: Hearty Lunch – Red Light Special (marshmallows): Eliminated 1st: Anna Harouvis; Round 2: Taco Night – Know Your Varieties & Grocery List (jarred meat, tamarind soda, pork rinds, frozen peaches): Eliminated 2nd: Joshua "Bushy" Bushnick; Round 3: Family Favorite – Culinary Quiz & One Ingredient Per Aisle: Eliminated 3rd: Felix Barron; Winner: Mark Estee ($20,000) Notes: Mark won the culinary quiz in round 2 so his advantage was a 30-second headstart. He also won the culinary quiz in round 3 and his advantage was an extra item. Judges: G. Garvin, Troy Johnson, Aarti Sequeira
20	8	"Produce and Cons"	June 29, 2014
Round 1: Vegetarian Feast – Meals from the Middle: Eliminated 1st: Michele Wilson; Round 2: Surf and Turf – Market Multiple Choice & Budget Battle ($9.35): Eliminated 2nd: Nicky Morse; Round 3: Best Dish – Food Wheel (whole chicken & "purple"): Eliminated 3rd: Johanna Lawrence; Winner: Trevor Ball ($20,000) Notes: Nicky won the new culinary quiz in round 2 and his advantage was getting an extra 65¢. Judges: Brian Malarkey, Beau MacMillan, Aarti Sequeira
21	9	"If At First You Don't Succeed, Fry, Fry Again"	July 6, 2014
Round 1: Fried Feast – Watch Your Weight (5 lbs.): Eliminated 1st: Colleen O'Hare; Round 2: Dish on a Stick – Culinary Quiz & Clearance Carts: Eliminated 2nd: Brandon Peacock; Round 3: Elegant Dinner – Food Wheel (pork chops & $7.86): Eliminated 3rd: Josh Silvers; Winner: Christopher Pipilis ($18,000) Notes: Josh won the culinary quiz in round 2 so his advantage was 1 extra ingredient. The pork chops in round 3 were provided to the contestants and it didn't count towards their budget. Judges: Melissa d'Arabian, Beau MacMillan, Catherine McCord
22	10	"Cart to Table"	July 13, 2014
Round 1: Comfort Food – Clearance Carts: Eliminated 1st: Annquinetta Kelly; Round 2: Breakfast for Dinner – Culinary Quiz & No Carts Allowed: Eliminated 2nd: Kim Malcolm; Round 3: Best Dish – Food Wheel (frozen tilapia & aisle 1): Eliminated 3rd: Christian Chavanne; Winner: Eddie Porter ($20,000) Notes: Eddie won the culinary quiz in round 2 so his advantage was being able to get an extra ingredient. Judges: Judy Joo, G. Garvin, Aarti Sequeira
23	11	"Weight for It"	July 20, 2014
Round 1: Best Burger – Watch Your Weight (4 lbs.): Eliminated 1st: Miles McMath; Round 2: A Square Meal – Know Your Varieties & Frozen Food Feud: Eliminated 2nd: Keith Loren; Round 3: Pork Dinner – Grocery List (fried onions, a starch, dried fruit, something red, ranch dressing, breakfast cereal): Eliminated 3rd: Elizabeth Ristovski; Winner: Holly Gray ($18,000) Notes: Elizabeth won the culinary quiz in round 2 so her advantage was one extra ingredient from anywhere in the store Judges: Melissa d'Arabian, Troy Johnson, Duskie Estes

=== Season 3 (2014) ===
No. overall	No. in season	Title	Original release date
24	1	"Around the World in Three Carts"	July 27, 2014
Round 1: International Dish – Clearance Carts: Eliminated 1st: Sarah Fish; Round 2: Dessert – Know Your Varieties & Red Light Special (jerky): Eliminated 2nd: Daniel Marquez; Round 3: Best Dish – Culinary Quiz & ABC Game ("C"): Eliminated 3rd: Tanya Millican; Winner: Ryan Murff ($16,000) Notes: Ryan won the culinary quiz in round 2 and his advantage was a 30-second head start. He also won the culinary quiz in round 3 and his advantage was an extra ingredient that began with any letter. The ABC game was introduced in this episode by special guest Jim Belushi. Judges: Judy Joo, Troy Johnson, Brian Malarkey
25	2	"Patiently Weighing"	August 3, 2014
Round 1: Comfort Food – Watch Your Weight (5 lbs.): Eliminated 1st: Rana Obeidat; Round 2: Noodle Dish – Word & Grocery List (anchovies, any nut, something green, grapefruit, shallots, mayonnaise): Eliminated 2nd: Vincenzo Pileggi; Round 3: Best Dish – One Ingredient Per Aisle: Eliminated 3rd: Eric Nelson Brown; Winner: Veronica Eicken ($18,000) Notes: For winning the second round culinary quiz, Veronica could omit 1 item from her grocery list. Judges: Melissa d'Arabian, Troy Johnson, Richard Blais
26	3	"Food Network All-Stars take to the Aisles"	August 10, 2014
Round 1: Best Dish – ABC Game ("F"): Eliminated 1st: Marc Murphy (Share Our Strength – $5,000); Round 2: International Dish – Food Wheel (whole chicken & $16): Eliminated 2nd: Cat Cora (Chefs for Humanity – $5,000); Round 3: Upscale Dinner – Word & Frozen Food Feud: Eliminated 3rd: Marcel Vigneron (Veggie U – $5,000); Winner: Alex Guarnaschelli (Alex's Lemonade Stand – $18,000) Notes: Food Network celebrity chefs compete for charity in this episode. Each chef that got eliminated received $5,000 from Guy and Food Network towards their charity. Marcel won the newest culinary quiz in round 3 so his advantage was 1 item from the produce aisle. Judges: Melissa d'Arabian, Beau MacMillan, Richard Blais
27	4	"Triple D Takes on Triple G"	September 28, 2014
Round 1: Comfort Food – Grocery List (ground meat, something over $5, radishes, maple syrup): Eliminated 1st: Stretch Rumaner; Round 2: Dinner Party – Clearance Carts: Eliminated 2nd: "Panini" Pete Blohme; Round 3: Guy's Favorite – Culinary Quiz & Red Light Special (popcorn) & Cart Swap: Eliminated 3rd: John Atkinson; Winner: Domineca Catelli ($20,000) Notes: All the chefs competing were featured on "Diners, Drive-Ins, and Dives". Stretch was the first (and currently only) contestant to bring his own shopping cart, complete with horn and flamethrower; he did not get to use it in the competition. John won the third round culinary quiz so his advantage was 1 extra item. This is the first time, according to Guy, that the chefs got a "double whammy" challenge, referring to the 2 official games in the final round. Judges: G. Garvin, Troy Johnson, Duskie Estes
28	5	"Aisle of Terror"	October 5, 2014
Round 1: Hearty Lunch – Red Light Special (caramel apple): Eliminated 1st: Art Jennette; Round 2: Savory Treat – Single Aisle Showdown (aisle 6, +protein, +1 item): Eliminated 2nd: Heather Feher; Round 3: Best Dish – Culinary Quiz & Grocery List (bone marrow, blood orange, any liquor, black garlic, a root vegetable, chicken liver): Eliminated 3rd: Phil Soussan; Winner: Kristopher Delee ($18,000) Notes: This is the first Halloween themed episode. In round 2, the contestants got to pick 1 protein and later on picked out an extra ingredient from Guy's small grocery rack. In round 3, for winning the culinary quiz, Kristopher's advantage was being able to omit one item from his grocery list. Judges: Melissa d'Arabian, Troy Johnson, Catherine McCord
29	6	"Pasta La Vista, Baby"	October 12, 2014
Round 1: Pasta Dish – Single Aisle Showdown (aisle 1): Eliminated 1st: Maribel Castaman; Round 2: BBQ Feast – No Carts Allowed: Eliminated 2nd: Robert Ledzianowski; Round 3: Dessert – Culinary Quiz & One Ingredient Per Aisle: Eliminated 3rd: Daniel Nilsson; Winner: Erin Coopey ($20,000) Notes: For winning the culinary quiz in round 3, Daniel's advantage was being able to grab an extra ingredient. However, he didn't need it and Erin forgot a crucial ingredient so in the spirit of fairness, he gave his extra ingredient advantage to Erin. Judges: Judy Joo, Beau MacMillan, Marcela Valladolid
30	7	"Fan-Tastic Food"	October 19, 2014
Round 1: 5-Star Seafood Dinner – 5 Ingredients or Less: Eliminated 1st: Jessica Grace; Round 2: Lasagna – Word & Un-Gredients List (dried pasta sheets, ground beef, garlic, ricotta, Parmesan cheese, jarred tomato sauce, mozzarella): Eliminated 2nd: Keith Breedlove; Round 3: Ultimate Burger – ABC Game ("S"): Eliminated 3rd: Felipe Milanes; Winner: Dustin Pestano ($16,000) Notes: For winning the second round culinary quiz, Keith's advantage was being able to use one of the cheeses on the list. According to Guy, a viewer online inspired the second-round game, "Un-gredients List" which made its debut in this episode. Guy provided ground beef to both chefs in the final round, which was exempt from the one-letter challenge. Judges: Beau MacMillan, Troy Johnson, Catherine McCord
31	8	"Not Going to Budge It"	October 26, 2014
Round 1: Best Grilled Dish – Budget Battle ($10.99): Eliminated 1st: Cherie Wynn; Round 2: Decadent Breakfast – Market Multiple Choice & Red Light Special (peanut butter & jelly): Eliminated 2nd: Bobby Hansen; Round 3: Sunday Supper – One Ingredient Per Aisle: Eliminated 3rd: Tori Nakano; Winner: Francois de Melogue ($18,000) Notes: For winning the second round culinary quiz, Tori's advantage was a 30-second head start. Judges: G. Garvin, Troy Johnson, Catherine McCord
32	9	"A Culinary Spelling Bee"	November 2, 2014
Round 1: Best Dish – ABC Game ("G"): Eliminated 1st: Carolyn O'Reilly; Round 2: Show Stopping Starter – Clearance Carts: Eliminated 2nd: Tom Lin; Round 3: Classic Dish – Culinary Quiz & Frozen Food Feud –: Eliminated 3rd: Rocky Durham; Winner: Tia Harrison ($18,000) Notes: For winning the third round culinary quiz, Rocky's advantage was an extra ingredient from anywhere in the store. Judges: Melissa d'Arabian, Beau MacMillan, G. Garvin
33	10	"Thanksgiving Grocery Trot"	November 9, 2014
Round 1: Inventive Fall Dish – Keep it Sample (cream of corn, pumpkin puree, quiche, black forest ham): Eliminated 1st: Ranada West-Riley; Round 2: Game Day Bites (Trio) – Red Light Special (frozen cranberries): Eliminated 2nd: Shawne Shell; Round 3: Upscale Thanksgiving Dinner – Culinary Quiz & 5 Ingredients or Less (+turkey breast): Eliminated 3rd: Terry Braggs; Winner: Randy Mulder ($18,000) Notes: This is the show's first Thanksgiving holiday episode. For winning the round 3 culinary quiz, Terry was able to get an extra ingredient but he ended up forgetting to put it on the plate. The contestants were provided turkey breast in round 3 which didn't count towards their 5 items. Judges: G. Garvin, Aarti Sequeira, Catherine McCord
34	11	"Aisle and Error"	November 16, 2014
Round 1: Decadent Dish – Meals From the Middle: Eliminated 1st: Mari Takahashi; Round 2: Seafood Dinner – Budget Battle ($8.50): Eliminated 2nd: Steve Couch; Round 3: Best Hot Sandwich – Market Multiple Choice & Closing Time (90 seconds): Eliminated 3rd: Michael Feker; Winner: Yvette Bonanno ($16,000) Notes: For winning the third round culinary quiz, Yvette's advantage was going back for an extra ingredient. Judges: Melissa d'Arabian, Troy Johnson, Richard Blais
35	12	"Pressed for Time"	November 23, 2014
Round 1: Panini Lunch – Grocery List (horseradish, something green, candied orange peel, jarred item): Eliminated 1st: Sanjivini Lal; Round 2: Favorite Rice Dish – Meals From the Middle: Eliminated 2nd: Carol Mackey; Round 3: Best Seafood Dinner – Culinary Close-Up & Closing Time (4 minutes) & Cart Swap: Eliminated 3rd: Brett Bowen; Winner: Scott Worontzoff ($16,000) Notes: For winning the third round culinary quiz, Brett's advantage was an extra ingredient from anywhere in the store. Judges: Marcela Valladolid, Judy Joo, Brian Malarkey
36	13	"The Weighting Game"	November 30, 2014
Round 1: Best Meat Dish – Watch Your Weight (6 lbs.): Eliminated 1st: Mariah Tysz; Round 2: All American Lunch – Food Wheel (frozen tilapia & $7.86): Eliminated 2nd: Jesse McQuarrie; Round 3: Gourmet Dinner – Culinary Quiz & Meals on No Wheels & Basket Swap & Red Light Special (chocolate): Eliminated 3rd: Rob Borden; Winner: Jean Paul Peluffo ($14,000) Notes: For winning the third round culinary quiz, Jean Paul's advantage was an extra ingredient. The third round had the most games to date on the show, including an unofficial one. First, the shop was limited to 4 minutes. Second it was a version of "Think Small" except instead of using a shopping bag, they had to use a shopping basket. Third, they had to swap ingredients. Fourth, partway into the cook, Guy stopped the clock to announce a red light special ingredient. Judges: Melissa d'Arabian, Troy Johnson, Richard Blais
37	14	"Let Them Eat Toast"	December 7, 2014
Round 1: French Toast – Aisle Down (bread aisle): Eliminated 1st: Alison Settle; Round 2: Steak Dinner – Know Your Varieties & Can Can: Eliminated 2nd: Tony Nasello; Round 3: Soup and Sandwich Combo – No Carts Allowed: Eliminated 3rd: Danielle McKay; Winner: Eric Brenner ($18,000) Notes: For winning the round 2 culinary quiz, Danielle's advantage was 1 item from the produce department. Judges: Aida Mollenkamp, Troy Johnson, Catherine McCord
38	15	"Dashing Through the Aisles"	December 14, 2014
Round 1: Favorite Holiday Meal – Keep it Sample (sweet potatoes, gingerbread man, lox, latkes): Eliminated 1st: Dominic Rocchi; Round 2: Holiday Dessert – Grocery Pictogram & Watch Your Weight (4 lbs.): Eliminated 2nd: Carol Koty; Round 3: Elegant New Years Dinner – No Carts Allowed: Eliminated 3rd: Eskender Aseged; Winner: Gene Philbin ($25,000) Notes: Though technically the first holiday episode was in season 1, this episode sets the basis for all future GGG holiday episodes with a fully decorated set and holiday themes in every round. For winning the culinary quiz in round 2, Carol's advantage was an extra pound of food. The winner got an extra $5,000 as a holiday bonus. Judges: Melissa d'Arabian, Troy Johnson, Beau MacMillan

=== Season 4 (2015) ===
The shopping spree format was tweaked with contestants no longer being able to pick and choose which item on the list to grab. Starting in aisle 1 and ending at aisle 10, they had 2 minutes to find 10 items, winning $2,000 for every item they got into their cart. If they could not find an item, they were allowed to skip it and move on to the next aisle.

No. overall	No. in season	Title	Original release date
39	1	"Family Style: Kids Rule!"	January 4, 2015
Round 1: Breakfast – Watch Your Weight (5 lbs): Eliminated 1st: Cindy Roberts (mom), Omar Roberts (son), Aida Roberts (daughter); Round 2: Hot Lunch – ABC Game ("R"): Eliminated 2nd: Laurel Robertson (mom), Cameron Robertson (son), & Megan Robertson (daughter); Round 3: Sunday Supper – Food Wheel (hot dogs & "red") & Time Out: Eliminated 3rd: Rick Bruno (dad), Harry Bruno (younger son), Shane Bruno (older son); Winners: Joe Chiovera (dad), Giuseppe Chiovera (younger son), & Xavier Chiovera (older son) ($14,000) Notes: This is the first of four special episodes where four different families compete together in teams of three; in this episode two young kids competed with a parent. In round 3, the kids from both teams were the only ones allowed to shop for food (while their fathers yelled out ingredients from the station area), and later on the kids had to work in the kitchen for a few minutes while their fathers were forced to give instructions via white eraser board. Judges: Melissa d'Arabian, Troy Johnson, Richard Blais
40	2	"Family Style: Sibling Rivalry"	January 11, 2015
Round 1: Family Feast – 5 Ingredients or Less: Eliminated 1st: MJ Testa (chef/sister), June Testa (sister), Lisa Testa (sister); Round 2: Something Stuffed – Grocery List (something in a box, item that costs $3.49, something from aisle 8, vegetable with a stem): Eliminated 2nd: Jose Loza (chef/brother), Maria Loza (sister), Edith Loza (sister); Round 3: Upscale Dinner – Food Wheel (strip steak + $7.15) & Time Out: Eliminated 3rd: Tregaye Fraser (chef/sister), Andrew Fraser (brother), Kristina Fraser (sister); Winner: Senada Grbic (chef/sister), Ermin Grbic (brother), Erna Grbic (sister) ($10,000) Notes: This is the second of four special episodes where four different families compete together as teams of three; in this episode a chef and their two siblings competed. The steaks weren't part of the food budget in round 3. Judges: Richard Blais, Troy Johnson, Aarti Sequeira
41	3	"Family Style: Food Feud"	January 18, 2015
Round 1: Noodle Dish – Aisle Down (aisle 4): Eliminated 1st: Chanee Thurston (chef/sister), Delon Thurston (sister), Ernistine Thurston (grandma); Round 2: Dessert – Meals from the Middle: Eliminated 2nd: Omar Vera (chef/husband) Rachel Vera (wife), Elizabeth Vera (sister-in-law); Round 3: Favorite Family Meal – Culinary Quiz & Watch Your Weight (5 1/2 lbs.): Eliminated 3rd: Dave Casey (chef/brother), Linda Casey (mother), Patrick Casey (brother); Winners: Bobby Parrish (chef/husband), Dessi Parrish (wife), Scott Parrish (brother) ($18,000) Notes: This is the third of four special episodes where different families compete together as teams of three; in this episode a chef and two other family members, including spouses, competed. In the second round, Guy allowed the chefs access to the dairy section for 1 minute. In the third round, the head chefs had to let their families go shopping (but they could yell the ingredients). The Casey family won the culinary quiz in the third round so their advantage was an extra half pound of food. Judges: Beau MacMillan, Troy Johnson, Catherine McCord
42	4	"Family Style: Kids' Choice"	January 25, 2015
Round 1: Brunch – Red Light Special (raisins): Eliminated 1st: Mandy Landefeld (mother), Jeff Landefeld (father), Drew Landefeld (son); Round 2: Comfort Meal – Budget Battle ($9.52) & Time Out: Eliminated 2nd: Donna Binbek (mother), Asha Binbek (daughter), Miriam Binbek (daughter); Round 3: Five Star Dinner – No Carts Allowed & Station Swap: Eliminated 3rd: Paul Murphy (father), Elizabeth Murphy (mother), Meghan Murphy (daughter); Winner: Michael Lavin (father), Lori Lavin (mother), Andrew Lavin (son) ($14,000) Notes: This is the last of four special episodes where four different families compete together as teams of three; in this episode parents and their children competed. During the round 2 "Time Out", the head chefs of each family had to step out of the cooking stations for a little while. In round 3, the parents had to carry the groceries while the kids picked the ingredients. Judges: Melissa d'Arabian, Richard Blais, Aarti Sequeira
43	5	"Love is in the Aisle"	February 8, 2015
Round 1: Savory Starter – Red Light Special (chocolate): Eliminated 1st: Hannah Ellham; Round 2: Culinary Quiz & Food Wheel ("red" & $30): Eliminated 2nd: Jerome Maxwell; Round 3: Candlelight Dinner – Musical Carts: Eliminated 3rd: Tara Tahbaz; Winner: Joel Miller ($14,000) Notes: This was a special Valentine's Day episode. For winning the culinary quiz in round 2, Joel was able to get an extra ingredient. The game "Musical Carts" made its debut in round 3. Judges: Duskie Estes, Troy Johnson, Catherine McCord
44	6	"Something Spells Good"	February 15, 2015
Round 1: Best Dish – ABC Game ("M"): Eliminated 1st: Matt Andrews; Round 2: Grilled Salad – Culinary Quiz & Watch Your Weight (6 lbs.): Eliminated 2nd: Tony Sharpe; Round 3: Best Burger – One Ingredient Per Aisle: Eliminated 3rd: Brian Anderson; Winner: Katherine Humphus ($16,000) Notes: For winning the culinary quiz in round 2, Brian was able to get 1 extra pound of food. Judges: Melissa d'Arabian, Madison Cowan, Catherine McCord
45	7	"Chefs Ham It Up"	February 22, 2015
Round 1: Barbecue Blowout – Budget Battle ($10.25): Eliminated 1st: Jamarr Massey; Round 2: Date Night Dinner – Logo Low-Down & Grocery List (Oscar Mayer carving board ham, caper berries, something from aisle 7, orange marmalade): Eliminated 2nd: Lisa Brooks; Round 3: Best Dish – Food Wheel (fresh salmon & aisle 10): Eliminated 3rd: Tony Nguyen; Winner: Caitie Maharg ($16,000) Notes: A new culinary quiz was introduced in this episode in round 2, which Caitie won. Her advantage was a 30-second head start. This is one of the few episodes that had a name brand product in round 2 (Oscar Mayer). Judges: Richard Blais, Troy Johnson, Aarti Sequeira
46	8	"Triple D Takes on Triple G... Again!"	March 1, 2015
Round 1: Ultimate Diner Dish – Watch Your Weight (7 lbs.): Eliminated 1st: Chris Hirsch; Round 2: Guy's Favorite – Culinary Quiz & Guy's Rack: Eliminated 2nd: Suzi Maitland; Round 3: Stuffed Entree – One Ingredient Per Aisle: Eliminated 3rd: Matt Nagan; Winner: Aaron May ($16,000) Notes: This is the second special episode where all the contestants were featured in 'Diners, Drive-ins and Dives'. Aaron won the second round culinary quiz and his advantage was getting 1 extra item. Each contestant had to pick less-than-desirable ingredients from Guy's grocery rack in round 2. Judges: Melissa d'Arabian, Troy Johnson, Aida Mollenkamp
47	9	"Don't Skimp on the Shrimp"	March 8, 2015
Round 1: Signature Dish – Watch Your Weight (4 1/2 lbs.): Eliminated 1st: Madea Allen; Round 2: Weeknight Family Dinner – Red Light Special (Seapak® jumbo butterfly shrimp): Eliminated 2nd: Dan Spangler; Round 3: Upscale Lunch – Know Your Varieties & One Ingredient Per Aisle: Eliminated 3rd: Stephane Meloni; Winner: Meghan Cooper ($12,000) Notes: Once again there was a name brand sponsor (Seapak) in round 2. Meghan won the third round culinary quiz and her advantage was picking 1 extra ingredient. Judges: G. Garvin, Troy Johnson, Aarti Sequeira
48	10	"James Beard Nominees on Triple G"	March 15, 2015
Round 1: Hors D'oeuvres – Red Light Special (instant ramen): Eliminated 1st: Todd Gray; Round 2: Five Star Seafood Dinner – Know Your Varieties & Budget Battle ($7.77): Eliminated 2nd: Dante Boccuzzi; Round 3: Best Dish – 123 Game (mushroom, 2 ways, 3 aisles): Eliminated 3rd: Marjorie Meek-Bradley; Winner: Rick Lewis ($14,000) Notes: All competing chefs were James Beard award nominees. Dante won the second round culinary quiz and his advantage was an extra 73¢ towards his budget. Judges: Melissa d'Arabian, Brian Malarkey, Aida Mollenkamp
49	11	"Music and Meatloaf"	March 22, 2015
Round 1: Meatloaf – Un-gredients (white bread, yellow onion, parsley, ground beef, eggs, ketchup): Eliminated 1st: Joan Taylor; Round 2: Party Appetizer – Keep It Sample (cottage cheese, cherry pie filling, vermouth, chips): Eliminated 2nd: [[[Kathy Fang]]; Round 3: Daring Dish – Culinary Quiz & Closing Time (2 minutes): Eliminated 3rd: Kaimana Chee; Winner: Corey Newman ($10,000) Notes: Kiamana won the third round culinary quiz and his advantage was being able to get 1 extra ingredient. Judges: Christy Vega, Beau MacMillan, Catherine McCord
50	12	"Winner, Winner Chicken Dinner"	March 29, 2015
Round 1: Best Dish – ABC Game ("P"): Eliminated 1st: Albert Alvarado; Round 2: Chicken Dinner – Grocery List (something that costs $2.99, gochujang, pickled item, candy): Eliminated 2nd: Ashley Cook; Round 3: Grilled Dish – Grocery Pictogram & Can Can: Eliminated 3rd: Joe Jacobsmeyer; Winner: Dave Cuntz ($12,000) Notes: Dave won the third round culinary quiz and his advantage was being able to get 1 item from the produce section. Judges: Christy Vega, Beau MacMillan, G. Garvin
51	13	"Chefs Take the High/Low Road"	April 5, 2015
Round 1: Hot Sandwich – Keep It Sample (cheese crackers, tamarind, milk, pot stickers): Eliminated 1st: Desiree Lavalette; Round 2: International Dish – Word & 5 Ingredients or Less: Eliminated 2nd: Joseph Gutierrez; Round 3: Best Dish – High/Low Food Wheel (rack of lamb & pork rinds): Eliminated 3rd: Ben Stephens; Winner: Reino Cruz ($16,000) Notes: Reino won the second round culinary quiz and his advantage was an extra ingredient. Judges: Melissa d'Arabian, Brian Malarkey, Catherine McCord
52	14	"Triple G a la No Cart"	April 12, 2015
Round 1: Mediterranean Feast – Meals From The Middle: Eliminated 1st: Robert Stewart; Round 2: Salad and Sandwich – Grocery Pictogram & No Carts Allowed: Eliminated 2nd: Andy "Ginger" Nienke; Round 3: Family Favorite – One Ingredient Per Aisle: Eliminated 3rd: Marisa Gittens; Winner: Drew Johnson ($14,000) Notes: Drew won the second round culinary quiz and his advantage was being able to get 1 extra item (though he didn't need it). Judges: G. Garvin, Richard Blais, Aarti Sequeira
53	15	"Bold Tastes and Big Laughs"	April 19, 2015
Round 1: Breakfast – ABC Game ("R"): Eliminated 1st: Chanda Clark; Round 2: Steakhouse Dinner – Watch Your Weight (4 lbs.): Eliminated 2nd: Marianne Sundquist; Round 3: Best Dish – High/Low Food Wheel (pâté & canned cheese): Eliminated 3rd: Chase Meneely; Winner: Walter Potenza ($12,000) Judges: Richard Blais, Troy Johnson, Catherine McCord
54	16	"Battle America!"	April 26, 2015
Round 1: Hometown Hit – 5 Ingredients or Less: Eliminated 1st: Scott Maki (the south); Round 2: Seafood Supper – Word & Frozen Food Feud: Eliminated 2nd: Eric Rogers (the midwest); Round 3: Best Dish – 123 Game (halibut & lamb, 2 ways, 3 aisles): Eliminated 3rd: Demetrio Zavala (east coast); Winner: Crista Luedtke (west coast – $16,000) Notes: Chefs representing the east coast, the west coast, the mid-west, and the south competed in this episode. Crista won the second round culinary quiz and her advantage was 1 item from the produce section. In previous 123 games, Guy gave both contestants the mandatory ingredient but in this episode, the contestants got to choose the ingredient they would prepare two ways (Crista picked halibut, Demetrio picked lamb). Judges: Troy Johnson, Aarti Sequeira, Catherine McCord

=== Season 5 (2015) ===
No. overall	No. in season	Title	Original release date
55	1	"Flavortown Throwdown"	May 3, 2015
Round 1: Hearty Lunch – Watch Your Weight (5 lbs.): Eliminated 1st: Jacqueline Mearman; Round 2: Innovative Dinner – Grocery List (Bush's Sweet Heat® beans, exotic fruit, item from aisle 8, black garlic): Eliminated 2nd: Cidney Wilcox; Round 3: Best Dish – Culinary Quiz & High/Low Food Wheel (oysters & liverwurst) & 3-Minute Shop: Eliminated 3rd: Mike Degen; Winners: Michael Hung ($10,000) Notes: Mike won the third round culinary quiz so his advantage was 30 seconds of shop time in the middle of the round (and he used them to get two key ingredients he forgot). Judges: G. Garvin, Beau MacMillan, Aida Mollenkamp
56	2	"Mother's Day Madness"	May 10, 2015
Round 1: Breakfast – Aisle Down (aisle 10): Eliminated 1st: Afreen Wahab; Round 2: Family Favorite – Market Multiple Choice & Express Lane (7 items, +1 extra item): Eliminated 2nd: Miriam Carlinbryan; Round 3: Indulgent Dinner – Flip This Dish (ladyfingers, instant espresso, mascarpone, dark rum, unsweetened cocoa powder): Eliminated 3rd: Reva Constantine; Winner: Jill Dedinsky ($18,000) Notes: This was mother's day special. Guy's wife, Lori, was a special guest who helped in Round 2 and offered an extra item to the contestants. Miriam won the second round culinary quiz so her advantage was a 30-second head start. Judges: Duskie Estes, Troy Johnson, Catherine McCord
57	3	"Orange You Glad You're in Flavortown"	May 17, 2015
Round 1: Comfort Dish – 5 ingredients or Less: Eliminated 1st: Lee Ann Miller; Round 2: Cocktail Brunch – Red Light Special (Simply Orange® pulp free juice): Eliminated 2nd: Charlie Ayers; Round 3: Dynamite Dinner – Culinary Quiz & Musical Carts: Eliminated 3rd: Ignacio Chavarria; Winner: Erika Tucker ($16,000) Notes: The red light special item in round two (Simply Orange) was a brand name item. Erika won the culinary quiz in round 3 so her advantage was to get one extra item after shopping was done. Judges: Christy Vega, Richard Blais, G. Garvin
58	4	"A Dicey Situation"	May 24, 2015
Round 1: Best Dish – Let It Roll (ricotta, juicer, 3:00, tofu): Eliminated 1st: Aimee Saling; Round 2: Champagne Brunch – Culinary Quiz & Clearance Carts: Eliminated 2nd: Maylin Navarro; Round 3: Chicken Dinner – One Ingredient Per Aisle: Eliminated 3rd: Andrew Reyes; Winner: Eddie Matney ($12,000) Notes: For winning the second round culinary quiz, Andrew's advantage was a 30-second head start. Judges: Brian Malarkey, Troy Johnson, Aarti Sequeira
59	5	"Thrillin' Grillin'"	May 31, 2015
Round 1: Best Grilled Dish – ABC Game ("A", "B", "G"): Eliminated 1st: Lexie Dean; Round 2: Meat Madness – Red Light Special (tamarind paste): Eliminated 2nd: Kathy Pullin; Round 3: Family Favorite – Culinary Quiz & Closing Time (2 minutes): Eliminated 3rd: Corey Hall; Winner: Antonio Skeeters ($14,000) Notes: The theme of this episode is grilling in every round. The first-round game was a variation of the ABC game where instead of letters chosen out of a jar, the letters given were based on the acronym for "Always Be Grilling". For winning the third round culinary quiz, Antonio's advantage was a 30-second head start. Judges: Brian Malarkey, Troy Johnson, Aarti Sequeira
60	6	"Triple G Redemption"	June 7, 2015
Round 1: Redemption Dinner – Grocery List (seafood, garlic, pasta, baby food): Eliminated 1st: Karen Forsberg; Round 2: High-End Lunch – Clearance Carts: Eliminated 2nd: Ghazwan Alsharif; Round 3: Best Dish – Let It Roll (4:30, buttermilk, ice cream): Eliminated 3rd: Daniel Nilsson; Winner: Tregaye Fraser ($14,000) Notes: Four returning chefs vie for a chance at redemption. The ingredients in the round 1 "Grocery List" were all ingredients each returning chef mishandled their first time around (and resulted in their first-time elimination). Tregaye Fraser is notable for going on to win season 12 of Food Network Star and even serving as a guest judge in some future episodes of GGG. Judges: Melissa d'Arabian, Aarti Sequeira, Troy Johnson
61	7	"Daring Kitchen Duos"	June 14, 2015
Round 1: Elevated Classic Duo – Frozen Food Can Can: Eliminated 1st: Kathryn Harrod and Celeste Terrell (engaged); Round 2: Soup and Sandwich Duo – ABC Game ("P" & "M") & Time-Out: Eliminated 2nd: Fletcher Starkey and Roshani Patel (dating); Round 3: Surf and Turf – One Ingredient At A Time: Eliminated 3rd: Ethan Gadson and Jamie Gadson (married); Winners: Peter Kahl and Cindy Kahl (divorced – $8,000) Notes: Four different couples (dating, engaged, married, and divorced) compete in this special episode. In round 1, two games were combined; "Frozen Food Feud" and "Can Can". A new game is introduced in round 3 where the pairs get one ingredient per trip, relay style. Judges: Christy Vega, Richard Blais, G. Garvin
62	8	"It's a Fieri Father's Day!"	June 21, 2015
Round 1: Family Dinner – Express Lane (7 items): Eliminated 1st: Ryan Jackson; Round 2: Guilty Pleasure – Food Pyramid (croutons, pears, mussels): Eliminated 2nd: Ryan Pang; Round 3: Date Night Dinner – Word & Closing Time (2 minutes) & Cart Swap: Eliminated 3rd: Alex Young; Winner: Ken Patrick ($12,000) Notes: This is a special Father's Day episode with Guy's older son, Hunter, helping host the episode. Ken won the culinary quiz in round 3 so his advantage was being able to get 2 extra ingredients. Judges: Melissa d'Arabian, Richard Blais, Aarti Sequeira
63	9	"Serving Up Summer"	June 28, 2015
Round 1: Barbecue Block Party – Let It Roll (sour cream, soy sauce, 2:30, ice cream): Eliminated 1st: Peter Botcher; Round 2: Seafood Spectacular – Word & Watch Your Weight (6 lbs.): Eliminated 2nd: Patrick Henry Sr.; Round 3: Chicken Dinner – Flip This Dish (cherries, cornstarch, almond extract, pie crust): Eliminated 3rd: Jennifer Solomon; Winner: John Conley ($16,000) Notes: For winning the round 2 culinary quiz, Patrick's advantage was an extra pound of food. Judges: Beau MacMillan, Aida Mollenkamp, Aarti Sequeira
64	10	"Battle America II: Cook or Be Cooked"	July 5, 2015
Round 1: Regional Feast – Odd/Even (odd aisles): Eliminated 1st: Paul Turano (east coast); Round 2: All-American Burger & Fries – Un-gredients (ground meat, buns, lettuce, tomatoes, potatoes): Eliminated 2nd: Marvin Woods (the south); Round 3: Presidential Dinner – Culinary Quiz & 4-Minute Shop & Red Light Special (jelly beans): Eliminated 3rd: Tracy Flores (west coast); Winner: Josh Galliano (the midwest – $20,000) Notes: This is the second special episode where the theme is bringing in contestants from four different parts of the United States (south, midwest, east coast, and west coast). For winning the third round culinary quiz, Josh's advantage was one extra ingredient. Judges: Richard Blais, Aida Mollenkamp, Catherine McCord

=== Season 6 (2015) ===
No. overall	No. in season	Title	Original release date
65	1	"Music and Mayhem in the Market"	July 12, 2015
Round 1: Best Dish – ABC Game ("S"): Eliminated 1st: Jodie Ruben; Round 2: Lavish Lunch – Vowel Play & Budget Battle ($10): Eliminated 2nd: Dan Saito; Round 3: Comfort Meal – Musical Carts: Eliminated 3rd: Veronica Marquez; Winner: Jordan Wakefield ($16,000) Notes: For winning the culinary quiz in round 2, Dan's advantage was an extra 75¢. Judges: Beau MacMillan, Troy Johnson, Aida Mollenkamp
66	2	"Cruisin' Through the Express Lane"	July 19, 2015
Round 1: Best Dish – Odd/Even (even aisles): Eliminated 1st: MJ Jackson; Round 2: International Dish – Keep It Sample (mango chips, dried chickpeas, fish sticks, cookie butter): Eliminated 2nd: Beth Shaw; Round 3: Dinner Party Plate – Express Lane (7 items): Eliminated 3rd: Kiet Philavanh; Winner: Scott Hines ($14,000) Judges: Melissa d'Arabian, Brian Malarkey, Aarti Sequeira
67	3	"High-Steak Hijinks"	July 26, 2015
Round 1: Comfort Meal – 5 Ingredients or Less: Eliminated 1st: Lior Hillel; Round 2: Upscale Dinner – Culinary Quiz & Grocery List (pretzels, ketchup, canned peaches, something for $1.99): Eliminated 2nd: Shoma Goomansingh; Round 3: Steak Sandwich – Odd/Even (even aisles): Eliminated 3rd: Trent Pavlik; Winner: Lisa Cornish ($16,000) Notes: For winning the second round culinary quiz, Lisa's advantage was 2 extra minutes of cook time (this was the first and currently only time extra cook time was given as an advantage). Judges: Catherine McCord, Richard Blais, Troy Johnson
68	4	"Young Guns Showdown"	August 2, 2015
Round 1: Best Dish – World Fusion (China & Italy): Eliminated 1st: Anthony DiCoco; Round 2: Daring Dish – Let It Roll (ketchup, juicer, maraschino cherry): Eliminated 2nd: Tyler Baxter; Round 3: Fine Dining Dinner – 123 Game (potato, 2 ways, 3 aisles): Eliminated 3rd: Jae-Eun Jung; Winner: Emily Newmark ($14,000) Notes: Young, up and coming chefs are featured in this episode. Judges: Melissa d'Arabian, G. Garvin, Aarti Sequeira
69	5	"Par for the Shoptacle Course"	August 9, 2015
Round 1: Burger And A Side – Shopstacle Course & Red Light Special (freeze dried fruits & vegetables): Eliminated 1st: Paul Adamson; Round 2: Upscale Dinner – Grocery Pictogram & ABC Game ("S"): Eliminated 2nd: Joseph "Scottie" Scott; Round 3: Best Dish – Let It Roll (mayonnaise & American cheese): Eliminated 3rd: Lena Price; Winner: Brandon Armstrong ($14,000) Notes: This episode had a patriotic slant with American flags decorating the cooking stations. The game in the first round, "Shopstacle Course", has only been played in this episode and it involved several piles of boxes and groceries stacked around the store to slow the shoppers down. Joseph won the round 2 culinary quiz so his advantage was getting an extra item that begins with any letter. Judges: Melissa d'Arabian, G. Garvin, Aarti Sequeira
70	6	"Flippin' Out in the Kitchen"	August 16, 2015
Round 1: Italian Feast – Watch Your Weight (4 lbs.): Eliminated 1st: Gabby Malito; Round 2: Breakfast – Garbled Groceries & Flip This Dish (romaine lettuce, Parmesan cheese, croutons, anchovies): Eliminated 2nd: Bourke Floyd; Round 3: Best Dish – Food Wheel (fresh salmon & aisle 9): Eliminated 3rd: Mary Schiller; Winner: Darion Williams ($20,000) Notes: A new culinary quiz was introduced in this episode ("Garbled Groceries") and Darion won it so his advantage was removing one item from the round 2 list. Judges: Richard Blais, Aida Mollenkamp, Catherine McCord
71	7	"All-Stars: Flavortown Flips Over the Judges!"	August 23, 2015
Round 1: International Lunch – ABC Game ("P", "Z"): Eliminated 1st: G. Garvin (Jenesse Center Inc.); Round 2: Decadent Dinner – Culinary Quiz & Single Aisle Showdown (aisle 1): Eliminated 2nd: Richard Blais (The Giving Kitchen); Round 3: Family Meal – Food Pyramid (frozen monkey bread, pimento cheese, canned tiny shrimp): Eliminated 3rd: Aarti Sequeira (Postpartum Support International); Winner: Beau MacMillan ($16,000 – St. Mary's Food Bank) Notes: This was the first of several special episodes where different celebrity chefs compete for their charity of choice. The contestants in this episode were regular GGG judges. Aarti won the round 2 culinary quiz so her advantage was an extra item from aisle 2. Judges: Duskie Estes, Troy Johnson, Catherine McCord
72	8	"All-Stars and A-Lister Dinners"	August 30, 2015
Round 1: Hearty Lunch – Grocery Bowl (ginger beer, tofu, wasabi paste, macaroons): Eliminated 1st: Eric Greenspan (Stu and the Kids); Round 2: All American Meal – Meals from the Middle: Eliminated 2nd: Jet Tila (K9s for Warriors); Round 3: A-List Dinner – High/Low Food Wheel (king crab & grits): Eliminated 3rd: Anne Burrell (JDRF); Winner: Marcel Vigneron ($20,000 – LA Kitchen) Notes: This was the second of several special episodes where different celebrity chefs compete for their charity of choice. Judges: Duskie Estes, Troy Johnson, Brian Malarkey
73	9	"All-Stars: Catch A Shopping Star"	September 6, 2015
Round 1: Favorite Lunch – Red Light Special (potato nuggets): Eliminated 1st: Patrick Neely (SCDAA); Round 2: Best Noodle Dish – Clearance Carts: Eliminated 2nd: Penny Davidi (Beyond the Bell); Round 3: Show Stopping Dinner – Food Pyramid (potato flakes, grape soda, short ribs): Eliminated 3rd: Ron Ben-Israel (Lambda Legal); Winner: Justin Warner ($16,000 – Bed-Stuy Campaign Against Hunger) Notes: This was the third of several special episodes where different celebrity chefs competed for their charity of choice. Judges: Melissa d'Arabian, Duskie Estes, G. Garvin
74	10	"All-Stars in the Aisles"	September 13, 2015
Round 1: Upscale Dinner – Frozen Food Feud & Can Can: Eliminated 1st: Aaron McCargo Jr. (Play To Win); Round 2: Relaxing Brunch – Musical Carts: Eliminated 2nd: Elizabeth Falkner (Cycle For Survival); Round 3: Best Dish – 123 Game (corn, 2 ways, 3 aisles): Eliminated 3rd: Madison Cowan (NYC Food Bank); Winner: Michael Psilakis ($16,000 – PKD Foundation) Notes: This was the fourth of several special episodes where different celebrity chefs competed for their charity of choice. Judges: Richard Blais, Troy Johnson, Duskie Estes
75	11	"All-Stars Team Up With Pro Athletes"	September 20, 2015
Round 1: Winner's Dinner – Express Lane (7 items): Eliminated 1st: No elimination; Round 2: Pre-Game Meal – Let It Roll (eggs, spiralizer, 2:30, beef jerky): Eliminated 2nd: Takeo Spikes (Rally Foundation) & Lorena Garcia (Common Threads) and Jennifer Lacy (Saved By The Ball) & Marc Murphy (No Kid Hungry); Round 3: Cheat Day Dish – One Ingredient At A Time: Eliminated 3rd: Rich Aurilia (Make A Wish Foundation) & Robert Irvine (Robert Irvine Foundation); Winner: Marcel Reece ($15,000 – Marcel Reece Foundation) & Brian Malarkey ($15,000 – Chimps Inc.) Notes: This was the fifth and last of several special episodes where different celebrity chefs compete. In this episode, athletes were paired up with celebrity chefs who had a chance to split up to $30,000 between their two charities of choice. This is the first time in the show that no contestants were eliminated in the first round, meaning there would be a double elimination in the second round. Judges: Beau MacMillan, Troy Johnson, Aarti Sequeira
76	12	"Blue Plate Blues"	September 27, 2015
Round 1: Blue Plate Special – Let It Roll (eggs, buttermilk, juicer, & potato chips): Eliminated 1st: Kristopher Murray; Round 2: Italian Classic – Culinary Quiz & High/Low Food Wheel (oysters & relish): Eliminated 2nd: Billy Reid; Round 3: Pork Dinner – One Ingredient Per Aisle: Eliminated 3rd: Luli Rangel; Winner: "Mama" Meg Heriford ($14,000) Notes: Billy won the round 2 culinary quiz so his advantage was a 30-second head start. Judges: G. Garvin, Aarti Sequeira, Catherine McCord

=== Season 7 (2015) ===
No. overall	No. in season	Title	Original release date	Production code
78	1	"An Offal Halloween"	October 4, 2015	GK0605H
Judges: Aida Mollenkamp, Troy Johnson, Aarti Sequeira
79	2	"Culinary Saved My Life"	October 11, 2015	GK0610H
Judges: Duskie Estes, Troy Johnson, Aarti Sequeira
80	3	"DDD Returns to GGG!"	October 18, 2015	GK0612H
Judges: Melissa d'Arabian, G. Garvin, Aarti Sequeira
81	4	"When Guy Gives You Lemon Bars…"	October 25, 2015	GK0502H
Judges: Richard Blais, Troy Johnson, Catherine McCord
82	5	"Triple G Chefs: The Next Generation"	November 1, 2015	GK0701H
Judges: Christy Vega, Beau MacMillan, Madison Cowan
83	6	"Grandma's Grocery Games"	November 8, 2015	GK0702H
Judges: Marc Summers, Beau MacMillan, Catherine McCord
84	7	"Turkey Day Tournament"	November 15, 2015	GK0608H
Judges: G. Garvin, Beau MacMillan, Aida Mollenkamp
85	8	"Season of Grocery Giving"	November 22, 2015	GK0603H
Judges: Richard Blais, Troy Johnson, Duskie Estes
85	8	"Tournament of Champions: Part 1"	November 29, 2015	GK0709H
Judges: Madison Cowan, Catherine McCord, Melissa d'Arabian
86	9	"Seasonings Greetings"	November 30, 2015	GK0604H
Judges: Melissa d'Arabian, Troy Johnson, Catherine McCord
87	10	"Tournament of Champions: Part 2"	December 6, 2015	GK0708H
Judges: Brian Malarkey, Troy Johnson, Catherine McCord
88	11	"Tournament of Champions: Part 3"	December 13, 2015	GK0710H
Judges: Melissa d'Arabian, Richard Blais, Duskie Estes
89	12	"Veteran's Holiday Showdown"	December 15, 2015	TBA
Judges: Beau MacMillan, Troy Johnson, Aarti Sequeira
90	13	"Tournament of Champions: Part 4"	December 20, 2015	GK0710H
Judges: Melissa d'Arabian, Richard Blais, Catherine McCord
91	14	"Tournament of Champions: Part 5"	December 27, 2015	GK0712H
Judges: Richard Blais, Troy Johnson, Aarti Sequeira

=== Season 8 (2016) ===
No. overall	No. in season	Title	Original release date	Production code
93	1	"Diners, Drive-ins and Drives Tournament: Part 1"	January 3, 2016	GK0801H
Judges: Melissa d'Arabian, Beau MacMillan, Aarti Sequeira
94	2	"Diners, Drive-ins and Drives Tournament: Part 2"	January 10, 2016	GK0802H
Judges: Melissa d'Arabian, Troy Johnson, Aarti Sequeira
95	3	"Diners, Drive-ins and Drives Tournament: Part 3"	January 17, 2016	GK0832H
Judges: Beau MacMillan, Troy Johnson, Aarti Sequeira
96	4	"Diners, Drive-ins and Drives Tournament: Part 4"	January 24, 2016	GK0804H
Judges: G. Garvin, Troy Johnson, Aarti Sequeira
97	5	"Diners, Drive-ins and Drives Tournament: Finale"	January 31, 2016	GK0805H
Judges: G. Garvin, Troy Johnson, Aarti Sequeira
98	6	"Four Weddings and a Grocery Game"	February 7, 2016	GK0806H
Judges: Melissa d'Arabian, Troy Johnson, Duskie Estes
99	7	"All-Star Academy Face-Off"	February 14, 2016	GK0807H
Judges: Christy Vega, Marc Summers, Marcel Vigneron
100	8	"Guy's Games of Chance"	February 21, 2016	GK0808H
Judges: Beau MacMillan, Aaron May, Catherine McCord
101	9	"Breakfast, Lunch and Dinner Cook-Off"	February 28, 2016	GK0809H
Judges: Marc Summers, Brian Malarkey, Ayesha Curry
102	10	"Perfect Strangers"	March 6, 2016	GK0810H
Judges: Christy Vega, Marc Summers, Richard Blais
103	11	"Big Burger Battle"	March 13, 2016	GK0811H
Judges: G. Garvin, Troy Johnson, Carl Ruiz

=== Season 9 (2016) ===
No. overall	No. in season	Title	Original release date	Production code
104	1	"Budget Games Blowout"	March 20, 2016	GK0901H
Judges: Melissa d'Arabian, G. Garvin, Catherine McCord
105	2	"Big Bacon Battle"	March 27, 2016	GK0902H
Judges: Duskie Estes, Marc Summers, Brian Malarkey
106	3	"Redemption Tournament: Part 1"	April 3, 2016	GK0904H
Judges: Richard Blais, Brandi Milloy, Damaris Phillips
107	4	"Redemption Tournament: Part 2"	April 10, 2016	GK0903H
Judges: Melissa d'Arabian, Troy Johnson, Richard Blais
108	5	"Redemption Tournament: Part 3"	April 17, 2016	GK0905H
Judges: Melissa d'Arabian, Brandi Milloy, Richard Blais
109	6	"Redemption Tournament: Part 4"	April 24, 2016	GK0906H
Judges: Beau MacMillan, Troy Johnson, Damaris Phillips
110	7	"Redemption Tournament: Finale"	May 1, 2016	GK0907H
Judges: Melissa d'Arabian, Troy Johnson, Beau MacMillan
111	8	"Grill or Be Grilled"	May 29, 2016	GK0908H
Judges: Richard Blais, Troy Johnson, Duskie Estes
112	9	"Food Network Star Showdown"	June 5, 2016	GK0909H
Judges: Nathan Lyon, Troy Johnson, Catherine McCord
113	10	"Food Wheel Free-For-All"	June 12, 2016	GK0910H
Judges: G. Garvin, Troy Johnson, Catherine McCord
114	11	"Dueling Dads"	June 19, 2016	GK0911H
Judges: Ayesha Curry, Marc Summers, Brian Malarkey
115	12	"Guy's Dessert Games"	June 26, 2016	GK0912H
Judges: Ron Ben-Israel, Duff Goldman

=== Season 10 (2016) ===
No. overall	No. in season	Title	Original release date	Production code
116	1	"Guy's Summer Games"	July 3, 2016	GK1001H
Judges: Roger Mooking, Aarti Sequeira, Catherine McCord
117	2	"Rising Stars"	July 10, 2016	GK1002ZH
Judges: Carl Ruiz, Justin Warner, Damaris Phillips
118	3	"Whiz Kids"	July 17, 2016	GK1003H
Judges: Melissa d'Arabian, Beau MacMillan, Kelsey Nixon
119	4	"Class Reunion: Food Network Star"	July 24, 2016	GK1004ZH
Judges: Melissa d'Arabian, Justin Warner, Damaris Phillips
120	5	"Cheesy Special"	July 31, 2016	GK1005H
Judges: Carl Ruiz, Troy Johnson, Damaris Phillips
121	6	"Salute to Firefighters"	August 7, 2016	GK1006H
Judges: Nathan Lyon, Aarti Sequeira, Catherine McCord
122	7	"Spice Masters"	August 14, 2016	GK1007H
Judges: Roger Mooking, Damaris Phillips, Aarti Sequeira
123	8	"Guy's Superstar Grocery Games: Part 1"	August 21, 2016	GK1008H
Judges: Carl Ruiz, Troy Johnson, Aarti Sequeira
124	9	"Guy's Superstar Grocery Games: Part 2"	August 28, 2016	GK1008H
Judges: Carl Ruiz, Troy Johnson, Aarti Sequeira
125	10	"Guy's Superstar Grocery Games: Part 3"	September 4, 2016	GK1010H
Judges: Carl Ruiz, Troy Johnson, Aarti Sequeira
126	11	"Guy's Superstar Grocery Games: Part 4"	September 11, 2016	GK1011H
Judges: Carl Ruiz, Troy Johnson, Aarti Sequeira
127	12	"Guy's Superstar Grocery Games: Finale"	September 18, 2016	GK1012H
Judges: Carl Ruiz, Troy Johnson, Aarti Sequeira

=== Season 11 (2016) ===
No. overall	No. in season	Title	Original release date	Production code
128	1	"Halloween Spook-Tacular"	October 2, 2016	GK1101H
Judges: Marc Summers, Troy Johnson, Damaris Phillips
129	2	"Grandma and Grandpa"	October 9, 2016	GK1102H
Game 3: Food Wheel – Dinner Party Dish; Judges: Marc Summers, Damaris Phillips, Phillip Frankland Lee
130	3	"Guilty Pleasures"	October 16, 2016	GK1103H
Game 3: Spree Ball – Decadent Dish; Judges: Justin Warner, Aarti Sequeira, Catherine McCord
131	4	"Fried Feud"	October 23, 2016	GK1104H
Judges: Carl Ruiz, Justin Warner, Aarti Sequeira
132	5	"Ultimate GGG Rematch"	October 30, 2016	GK1105H
Judges: Melissa d'Arabian, Justin Warner, Beau MacMillan
133	6	"Cooking Channel Cook-Off"	November 6, 2016	GK1106H
Judges: Richard Blais, Justin Warner, Aarti Sequeira
134	7	"Thanksgiving in Flavortown"	November 13, 2016	GK1107H
Judges: Marc Summers, Aaron May, Damaris Phillips
135	8	"Guys' Unforgettable Chefs"	November 20, 2016	GK1108H
Judges: Beau MacMillan, Catherine McCord, Reno Henriques
136	9	"Joy to the Judges"	November 21, 2016	GK1114H
Judges: Justin Warner, Damaris Phillips, Catherine McCord
137	10	"Culinary Saved My Life 2"	November 27, 2016	GK1109H
Judges: Duskie Estes, Carl Ruiz, Beau MacMillan
138	11	"GGG Impossible: Part One"	December 4, 2016	GK1101H
Judges: Richard Blais, Robert Irvine, Brandi Milloy
139	12	"GGG Impossible: Part Two"	December 11, 2016	GK1102H
Judges: Richard Blais, Robert Irvine, G. Garvin
140	13	"Holiday Madness"	December 12, 2016	GK1103H
Judges: Aarti Sequeira, Marc Summers, Ayesha Curry
141	14	"GGG Impossible: Part Three"	December 18, 2016	GK1103H
Judges: Richard Blais, Robert Irvine, Brandi Milloy
142	15	"GGG Impossible: Finale"	December 25, 2016	GK1103H
Judges: Robert Irvine, Richard Blais, G. Garvin

=== Season 12 (2017) ===
No. overall	No. in season	Title	Original release date	Production code
143	1	"Diners, Drive-ins and Dives Tournament 2: Part 1"	January 1, 2017	GK1201H
Judges: Carl Ruiz, Troy Johnson, Damaris Phillips
144	2	"Diners, Drive-ins and Dives Tournament 2: Part 2"	January 1, 2017	GK1204H
Judges: Carl Ruiz, Troy Johnson, Damaris Phillips
145	3	"Diners, Drive-ins and Dives Tournament 2: Part 3"	January 15, 2017	GK1203H
Judges: Carl Ruiz, Troy Johnson, Damaris Phillips
146	4	"Diners, Drive-ins and Dives Tournament 2: Part 4"	January 22, 2017	GK1202H
Judges: Carl Ruiz, Troy Johnson, Damaris Phillips
147	5	"Diners, Drive-ins and Dives Tournament 2: Finale"	January 29, 2017	GK1205H
Judges (1st set): Carl Ruiz, Damaris Philips, Troy Johnson; Judges (2nd set): Troy Johnson, Damaris Phillips, Aaron May
148	6	"All Pyramid"	February 5, 2017	GK1116H
Judges: Justin Warner, Damaris Phillips
149	7	"Guy's Chocolate Games"	February 12, 2017	GK1206H
Judges: Damiano Carrara, Troy Johnson, Domenica Catelli
150	8	"Budget Bonanza"	February 19, 2017	GK1207H
Judges: Melissa d'Arabian, Eddie Jackson, Aarti Sequeira
151	9	"Funny Food"	February 26, 2017	GK1209H
Judges: Justin Warner, Troy Johnson, Aarti Sequeira
152	10	"Big Bacon Battle 2"	March 5, 2017	GK1208H
Judges: Duskie Estes, Eric Greenspan, Justin Warner
153	11	"Supermarket Masters Tournament: Part 1"	March 12, 2017	GK1213H
Judges: Marc Murphy, Troy Johnson, Aarti Sequeira
154	12	"Supermarket Masters Tournament: Part 2"	March 12, 2017	GK1212H
Judges: Marc Murphy, Troy Johnson, Aarti Sequeira
155	13	"Supermarket Masters Tournament: Part 3"	March 19, 2017	GK1211H
Judges: Marc Murphy, Troy Johnson, Aarti Sequeira
156	14	"Supermarket Masters Tournament: Part 4"	April 2, 2017	GK1214H
Judges: Marc Murphy, Troy Johnson, Aarti Sequeira
157	15	"Supermarket Masters Tournament: Finale"	April 9, 2017	GK1215H
Judges: Marc Murphy, Troy Johnson, Aarti Sequeira

=== Season 13 (2017) ===
No. overall	No. in season	Title	Original release date	Production code
158	1	"GGG vs. Iron Chefs"	April 23, 2017	GK1305H
Judges: Alex Guarnaschelli, Beau MacMillan, Duskie Estes
159	2	"Friend or Foe"	April 30, 2017	GK1302H
Judges: Brandi Milloy, Troy Johnson, Catherine McCord
160	3	"Family Food Feud"	May 7, 2017	GK1210H
Judges: Brandi Milloy, Eddie Jackson, Aarti Sequeira
161	4	"All-Star Moms"	May 14, 2017	GK1304H
Beau MacMillan, Aarti Sequeira, and Justin Warner; Judges: Kelsey Nixon, Catherine McCord, Brian Malarkey
162	5	"All Burgers 2"	May 28, 2017	GK1309H
Judges (1st set): Aaron May, Damaris Phillips, Catherine McCord; Judges (2nd set): Beau MacMillan, Aarti Sequeira, Justin Warner
163	6	"Grocery Grudge Match"	June 11, 2017	GK1301H
Judges: Damaris Philips, Eric Greenspan, Brian Malarkey
164	7	"Father Cooks Best"	June 18, 2017	GK1306H
Judges: Marc Summers, Beau MacMillan, Rev Run
165	8	"Twin It to Win It"	June 25, 2017	GK1307H
Judges: Justin Warner, Damaris Phillips, Brian Malarkey
166	9	"Carnival Games"	July 2, 2017	GK1308H
Judges: Aarti Sequeira, Melissa d'Arabian, Aaron May
167	10	"All in the Family"	July 9, 2017	GK1310H
Judges: Marc Summers, Rev Run, Damaris Phillips
168	11	"American Heroes"	July 16, 2017	GK1311H
Judges: Marc Summers, Rev Run, Damaris Phillips

=== Season 14 (2017) ===
No. overall	No. in season	Title	Original release date	Production code
169	1	"Blogger Battle"	July 23, 2017	GK1401H
Judges: Brandi Milloy, Rev Run, Catherine McCord
170	2	"Grill Masters of the Universe"	July 26, 2017	GK1402H
Judges: Beau MacMillan, Damaris Phillips, Rutledge Wood
171	3	"GGG Jrs."	July 30, 2017	GK1403H
Judges: J. Kenji López-Alt, Brandi Milloy, Damaris Phillips
172	4	"Cheesier"	August 13, 2017	GK1303H
Judges: Troy Johnson, Aarti Sequiera, Aaron May (chef)
173	5	"Superstars Tournament Part 1"	August 20, 2017	GK1404H
Judges: Carl Ruiz, Troy Johnson, Aarti Sequeira
174	6	"Superstars Tournament Part 2"	August 27, 2017	GK1405H
Judges: Eric Greenspan, Troy Johnson, Aarti Sequeira
175	7	"Superstars Tournament Part 3"	September 3, 2017	GK1406H
Judges: Aaron May (chef), Troy Johnson, Aarti Sequeira
176	8	"Superstars Tournament Part 4"	September 10, 2017	GK1407H
Judges: Carl Ruiz, Troy Johnson, Aarti Sequiera
177	9	"Superstars Tournament Finale"	September 17, 2017	GK1408H
Judges: Jet Tila, Troy Johnson, Aarti Sequeira
178	10	"GGG Superfans"	September 24, 2017	GK1410H
Judges: Troy Johnson, Catherine McCord, Justin Warner
179	11	"Guy's Ghostly Games"	October 8, 2017	TBA
Judges: Aarti Sequeira, Beau MacMillan, Duff Goldman

=== Season 15 (2017/2018) ===
No. overall	No. in season	Title	Original release date
180	1	"Spice City"	October 15, 2017
Round 1: Spicy High-End Dinner – Flip This Dish (bread, eggs, raisins, vanilla); Eliminated 1st: Katy Chang: Round 2: Signature Spicy Dish – Spree Ball (habanero, dried ghost pepper, habanero); Eliminated 2nd: Collin Craig: Round 3: Extra Spicy Guilty Pleasure – Grocery List (pepperoni, pepperjack cheese, pepper jelly, pickled pepper); Eliminated 3rd: Katy Smith: Winner: Jazz Singsanong ($16,000); Notes: The theme of this episode is cooking spicy foods in every round. In the round 2 spree ball: Katy rolled first, Jazz rolled second, and Collin rolled third. Judges: Aarti Sequeira, Jet Tila, Tregaye Fraser
181	2	"One Shop Showdown"	October 22, 2017
Round 1: Comfort Breakfast; Eliminated 1st: Peter Botros: Round 2: Spicy Lunch – Guy's Spice Rack; Eliminated 2nd: Rosako Bailey: Round 3: Fried Dinner – Food Pyramid (wasabi, fry mix, ricotta); Eliminated 3rd: Josh Steiner: Winner: Lacy Larson ($20,000); Notes: Chefs were given $60 and had 5 minutes to buy the groceries they needed to last them for all three rounds (breakfast, lunch, & dinner). There was no game in the first round. In the second round, Guy let them choose a single spicy ingredient for their dish. Judges: Marc Murphy, Eric Greenspan, Marc Summers
182	3	"Pizza Masters"	October 29, 2017
Round 1: Decadent Pizza – High/Low Food Wheel (Wagyu rib-eye & grape jelly); Eliminated 1st: Terrill Brazelton: Round 2: Guilty Pleasure Pizza – No Carts Allowed; Eliminated 2nd: Nino Coniglio: Round 3: Out of the Box Pizza – Out of Stock (no pizza dough); Eliminated 3rd: Brittany Saxton: Winner: Jonathan Shepard ($16,000); Notes: The theme of this episode was making pizzas in every round. Judges: Tregaye Fraser, Eddie Jackson, Marc Murphy
183	4	"GGG Gives Thanks"	November 5, 2017
Round 1: Thanksgiving Feast – Cornucopia; Eliminated 1st: No elimination Best Dish: Michael Rudolph & Carl Ruiz: Round 2: Fall Family Favorite – Grocery List (pretzels, squash, farro, pancetta); Eliminated 2nd: Michael Rudolph & Carl Ruiz, and Michael Hillstrom & Damaris Phillips: Winners: Robb Ledesma & Aaron May ($10,000); Notes: This was a special Thanksgiving episode where three judges pair up with three young, aspiring chefs from Guy's special culinary program, 'Worth Our Weight'. The winner gets a guaranteed $10,000. In a surprise twist the non-winning aspiring chefs won $5,000. The round 1 game was a version of 'Think Small' where they had to use a cornucopia shaped basket to fit all their groceries. In the spirit of Thanksgiving, no one was eliminated in the first round which meant a double elimination and an automatic winner in the second round. For having the best dish in round 1, Michael and Carl didn't have to use one of the mandatory ingredients on the grocery list. Judges: Marc Murphy, Aarti Sequeira, Rutledge Wood
184	5	"DDD Holiday Showdown"	November 12, 2017
Round 1: Holiday Ham Dish – Secret Santa (seafood seasoning, creme fraiche, chocolate hazelnut spread, fish sauce); Eliminated 1st: Heather Ludzack: Round 2: Holiday Family Dinner – Stocking Stuffer (fruit cake, potato latke mix, egg nog, candy canes); Eliminated 2nd: Louis Remillard and "Panini" Pete Blohme: Winner: Richard Hales ($20,000); Notes: In this holiday episode, Guy invites some of his favorite DDD and GGG chefs who are competing for charity. Guy brought in his son, Hunter, to help with the first game where each chef got a gift box with a mandatory ingredient inside related to their cooking style or hometown. Round 2 was changed into a winner-take-all round and the game played was a version of "Grocery List" where the mandatory ingredients were already packed in a Christmas stocking. In the spirit of the holidays, Richard offered to split his winnings with his fellow round 2 competitors (and Guy let them join Richard on the shopping spree). Judges: Aaron May, Carl Ruiz, Aarti Sequiera
185	6	"Last Judge Standing Tournament Part 1"	November 19, 2017
Round 1: Steakhouse Dinner – Face Wheel (Carl Ruiz: turkey jerky & Eric Greenspan: canned octopus); Best Dish: Eric Greenspan Moving On: Damaris Phillips, Duskie Estes, Aaron May, Melissa D'Arabian, Carl Ruiz: Round 2: 'Chocolatey' 'Pork' 'Pot Pie' – Menu Magnet Madness; Moving on: Justin Warner Eliminated: Aarti Sequiera (Post-Partum Depression – $1,000) Notes: Similar to the previous season's 'Superstars Tournament', part 1 of this 5 part tournament starts off with eight contestants; all GGG judges. The best six dishes in round 1 move on while the bottom two compete again in a round 2 "redemption round". The winner of round 2 joins the round 1 winners and the other chef is sent home. The round 1 game is a variation of "Food Wheel" where photos of each judge is placed on a wheel and the photo it lands on represents the judge's least favorite food; and the food everyone will all have to cook with in round 1. Each eliminated chef gets $1,000 donated to their charity. Judges: Troy Johnson, Catherine McCord, Brian Malarkey
186	7	"Last Judge Standing Tournament Part 2"	November 26, 2017
Round 1: Best Pasta Dish – Express Lane (8 Items) & ABC Game ("S"); Best Dish: Aaron May Moving On: Aaron May, Eric Greenspan, Damaris Phillips, Carl Ruiz: Round 2: Korean pizza, Korean sub & fries, or Korean dessert – Wild Cards (Korean); Moving on: Justin Warner, Duskie Estes Eliminated: Melissa D'Arabian (American Foundation for Suicide Prevention – $1,000) Notes: Part 2 of a 5 part tournament starts off with seven GGG judges. The best four dishes in round 1 move on while the bottom three compete against each other in round 2 and one chef is sent home. For winning best dish, Aaron May was given an advantage for the third episode. Judges: Troy Johnson, Catherine McCord, Brian Malarkey
187	8	"Last Judge Standing Tournament Part 3"	December 3, 2017
Round 1: Regional Seafood Plate – Budget Battle (~~$40~~ $20) & No Carts Allowed; Best Dish/Moving On: Duskie Estes & Damaris Phillips: Round 2: Elevated Guilty Pleasure – Dinner Rush (20 minutes); Moving on: Eric Greenspan, Aaron May, Carl Ruiz Eliminated: Justin Warner (Planned Parenthood – $1,000) Notes: Part 3 of a 5 part tournament starts off with six GGG judges who get paired up in round 1. For winning best dish last episode, Aaron's advantage is picking the teams for round 1 (he picked Eric for his teammate, and paired up Justin with Carl and Duskie with Damaris). The best team moves on while the bottom four compete against each other. Though Guy initially gave the chefs a $40 budget in round 1, he cut the amount in half at the registers, forcing the chefs to quickly re-think their dish. Judges: Troy Johnson, Catherine McCord, Brian Malarkey
188	9	"Last Judge Standing Tournament Part 4"	December 10, 2017
Round 1: Best Cheese Dish – Kiddie Carts & Frozen Food Feud & Can Can; Best Dish/Moving On: Aaron May: Round 2: Refined Dinner – Grocery Bowl (black beans, kimchi, wasabi peas); Moving on: Carl Ruiz, Eric Greenspan, Damaris Phillips Eliminated: Duskie Estes (Worth Our Weight – $1,000) Notes: Part 4 of a 5-part tournament starts off with five GGG judges. The best dish in round 1 gets moves onto the finale and gets an advantage in the final episode. The bottom four compete against each other with only three moving onto the finale. Judges: Troy Johnson, Catherine McCord, Brian Malarkey
189	10	"Last Judge Standing Tournament Finale: Judgment Day"	December 17, 2017
Round 1: Chicken Dinner – Grocery List (canned asparagus, dandelion greens, gefilte fish); Eliminated 1st: No elimination Best Dish: Damaris Phillips: Round 2: Lunch – Food Pyramid (Duskie Estes: pork party mix, lunch, 5 lbs.); Eliminated 2nd: Damaris Phillips (Louisville Story Program – $1,000) & Carl Ruiz (National Alzheimer's Association – $1,000): Round 3: Judgement Day Dinner – 7 Items or List (aisle 8 Item, something orange, meat on the bone, carbonated item, boxed item, something over $10, something under 9 oz.); Eliminated 3rd: Aaron May (Jared Allen's Home for Wounded Warriors – $5,000): Winner: Eric Greenspan (National Public Radio – $40,000); Notes: Final part starts off with four GGG judges competing in a regular format episode where the last chef standing will win $40,000 for their charity. For winning best dish last episode, Aaron's advantage in round 1 was not having to use 1 ingredient from the grocery list. Since no one was eliminated in round 1, there was a double elimination in round 2. The food pyramid game combined the "Face Wheel" concept (photos of all judges) from part 1 and the game "Watch Your Weight", plus it assigned them their dish. Damaris' round 1 "best dish" advantage was getting an extra 2 lbs. of food. The final game combined "Grocery List" with "Express Lane" and required them to use only the 7 items on the list. The runner-up got $5,000 towards their charity. Judges: Troy Johnson, Catherine McCord, Brian Malarkey
190	11	"Clash of the Classics"	January 7, 2018
Round 1: Retro Redo – Express Lane (10 items); Eliminated 1st: Chloe Baker: Round 2: Regional Classic Dish – Keep It Sample (bacon bits, canned ham, frozen orange juice, TV dinner); Eliminated 2nd: Beth Lyon: Round 3: 'Garlicky' 'Lamb' 'Wellington' – Menu Magnet Madness; Eliminated 3rd: Kevin Robinson: Winner: Bobby Will ($16,000); Notes: The theme of this episode was versions of classic, old-school dishes in every round. Judges: Justin Warner, Catherine McCord, Aaron May

=== Season 16 (2018) ===
No. overall	No. in season	Title	Original release date
191	1	"Grocery Rush"	January 14, 2018
Round 1: Breakfast rush – 15 minutes; Eliminated 1st: Kiel Ard: Round 2: Lunch rush – 15 minutes, 8 Items or Less; Eliminated 2nd: Ian Fleischmann: Round 3: Dinner rush – 20 minutes, Double Food Wheel (Spot Prawns and Bologna); Eliminated 3rd: Kristi Genova: Winner: Natalie Curie ($16,000); Notes: This episode challenges chefs to complete delicious meals in very rapid meals. All games are under 20 minutes. All challenges were twists on a common show challenge: grocery rush. Round 1 involved quickly preparing a breakfast dish, with the only requirements being an unprecedented 15-minute duration. Chef Ian cracked his ceramic serving dishes by heating them on the stove, complicating his shakshuka plating. Chef Kiel’s dish needed more seasoning, which led to the first-round elimination with rustic farmer’s skillet. Round 2 continued the theme into lunch while intensifying the challenge with an 8-ingredient limit. Chef Ian’s ahi tuna tostada with yuzu crema was under salted and therefore eliminated. Round 3 completed the day with a dinner rush. The game, food wheel, ended in two required ingredients: spot prawns (which the contestants wanted) and bologna (which they didn’t). Kristi’s bologna was hidden in the spaghetti al formaggio, leading to Natalie’s spot prawns with potatoes and bologna molé sauce win. Judges: Eric Greenspan, Eddie Jackson, Catherine McCord
192	2	"Full-on Fried"	January 17, 2018
Round 1: Far Out Fried Food – Red Light Special (Baby Bananas); Eliminated 1st: TJ Greene and Lu Holter: Round 2: Best Fried Dish – Kiddie Karts; Eliminated 2nd: Melva Jarvis: Winner: Ari Feingold ($15,000); Round 3: Classic Dish – Food Wheel (Lasagna or Burger); Winner: Beau MacMillan ($5,000); Notes: This episode pitted fried-food expert chefs against each other to create excellent dishes from the deep fryer. The first round was open to the chefs’ delight, encouraging creative fried meals as long as they included baby bananas. Chef Lu and Chef TJ both went home in the first challenge because their fried fruit and cheese platter and fried seafood platter (respectively) were not adequately well-formed as a dish. The second challenge, now being the winning round, involved a showstopping fried meal. Ari’s fried chicken over Israeli citrus salad beat out Melva’s pecan fried ice cream with pear and rum glaze, which had a cereal crust that fell apart. Ari donated the money to victims of the recent California wildfires. In a dramatic twist, the judges competed in round 3 to deep fry a traditional dish. Guy judged Beau’s fried bologna burger to win over Aarti’s fried lasagna and Eric’s fried burger wellington. The winnings were donated locally to firefighters. Judges: Eric Greenspan, Beau MacMillan, Aarti Sequeira
193	3	"GGG vs. DDD"	January 21, 2018
Round 1: Classic Culinary Duo – 7 items or list (aisle 5, purple, meat on the bone, frozen, bottom shelf, something spicy, under $1); Advantage: (Team DDD) “Panini” Pete Blohme and Domenica Catelli: Round 2: Surf and Turf – Grocery Bowl (aisles 1, 2, 4, and 9); Eliminated 1st: (Team GGG) Samantha Mitchell and Sammy Monsour: Winner: (Team DDD) “Panini” Pete Blohme and Domenica Catelli ($20,000); Notes: On this episode, winning chefs from past episodes of Guy’s Grocery Games compete against experienced chefs covered on Guy’s flagship show, Diners, Drive-ins, and Dives. The first round instructed the chefs to cook a classic duo (e.g. chicken and waffles) using only 7 limited ingredients. Team DDD won with pork chops with purple “shmashel” sauce beat team GGG’s burgers, which were overdone, with purple cabbage slaw and purple fries. Round 2 involved making a surf and turf dish using only items from frozen foods, the ethnic aisle, produce, and wine/alcohol/cooking liquids. Team DDD’s advantage allowed them to use items in the dairy aisle. Guy spent the last 15 minutes of round accepting a challenge from the judges to make a cauliflower steak. Team DDD won over Team GGG with “Pac-Bam” surf and turf vs. seared tuna with mushrooms and chimichurri sauce (which had too much garlic) Judges: Troy Johnson, Catherine McCord, Carl Ruiz
194	4	"Spiciest"	January 24, 2018
Round 1: Spicy Chicken Dish – Grocery List ($5.99, Something Frozen, Lemon Yogurt, and Something Spicy); Eliminated 1st: Cherven Desauguste: Round 2: Hometown Heat – Food Wheel (Ghost Pepper and Thai Chilies); Eliminated 2nd: Navin Hariprasad: Round 3: Sweet and Spicy – Budget Battle ($20); Eliminated 3rd: Miguel Chavez: Winner: Patty Neumson ($20,000); Notes: This peppery episode turns up the heat on Guy’s Grocery Games with spicy dishes prepared throughout. To start, round 1 produced a grocery listed chicken dish. Chef Cherven’s crusted ghost pepper chicken was neutralized by its overly mild yogurt glaze. Guy requested that the chef’s prepare spicy dishes from their hometowns for round 2. The aerosolized spice was so strong that several production members and the judges had intense reactions. Chef Navin’s spicy fried chicken with chili gnocchi was eliminated after it failed to ignite flames in the judges’ hearts. In the final round, Guy turned up the heat looking for a sweet and spicy dish on a frugal budget. Chef Miguel’s chipotle pork chops did not have a balance of sweet and spicy, leading to Patty’s win. Patty planned to use the winnings to support her sister’s kids in Thailand. Judges: Troy Johnson, Aaron May, Carl Ruiz
196	5	"GGG International All Stars"	January 28, 2018
Round 1: Hometown Favorite – Express Lane (7 items or less); Eliminated 1st: Lucy Bak Corea: Round 2: International Lunch – Lunch Rush (15 minutes); Eliminated 2nd: Chris Tzorin: Round 3: High-end Dinner – High/Low Food Wheel (Creamed Corn and Dry-aged Rib-eye); Eliminated 3rd: Stephane Meloni: Winner: Walter Potenza ($16,000); Notes: Returning contestants from Guy’s Grocery Games compete to express their respective cultural cuisines, starting with a hometown favorite. Chef Lucy’s Korean Galbi was eliminated since it needed more ingredients to shine. Round 2 revolved an internationally themed lunch rush. Chef Chris’s Grilled Caesar Salad was too charred, leading to his elimination. The final round pitted France versus Italy in a frenetic international dinner. Chef Stephane’s steak au poivre with creamed corn au gratin was slightly burnt, leading to Chef Walter’s win. Judges: Robert Irvine, Marc Murphy, Aarti Sequeria
196	6	"GGG Judges and Their Spouses"	February 11, 2018
Round 1: Romantic Dinner – Shopping List (Sparkling Wine, Dates, Something Sweet); Eliminated 1st: Aarti & Ben: Round 2: Favorite Dish – Menu Mind Meld (combined dishes); Eliminated 2nd: Jet & Allison: Winner: Damaris & Darrick ($20,000); Notes: Spouses join GGG judges to cook in this episode. To start, the couples craft romantic dinners with the professional chefs blindfolded while they shopped. Chef Aarti and Bren’s Tandoori chicken with date and tamarind chutney was eliminated because the chicken was still raw in the center. The remaining teams had to find a way to combine their favorite dishes for the final round. Guy threw a curveball by pulling the chefs out of the kitchen, forcing their spouses to cook alone. Further, the chefs can only communicate by whiteboard. With five minutes left on the clock, chefs jumped back in. Chef Jet and Allison’s Panang Curry with Angel Wings lost only because they needed a little more salt. Chef Damaris and Darrick hope to use their winnings towards an adoption process. Judges: Richard Blais, Antonia Lofaso, Rutledge Wood

=== Season 17 (2018) ===
No. overall	No. in season	Title	Original release date
197	1	"Noodle Games"	February 28, 2018
Round 1: Signature noodle dish – 30 minutes, 8 Items or Less; Eliminated 1st: David Kong: Round 2: Spicy Noodle Dish – 30 minutes, Wild cards(Chicken Nuggets, Fish Sticks, Onion Rings, or Chicken Fried Steak); Eliminated 2nd: Anthony Vitolo: Round 3: Classic Noodle Dish – 30 minutes, Grocery List (canned meat, something for 0.99, something in aisle 8); Eliminated 3rd: Louis Kao: Winner: Lindsay Porter ($16,000); Judges: Aarti Sequeira, Jet Tila, Antonia Lofaso
198	2	"Judge vs. Judge"	March 4, 2018
Judges: Damaris Phillips, Aarti Sequeira, Jonathan Waxman
199	3	"Bacon to the Max"	March 7, 2018
Round 1: Over The Top Bacon Dish – 30 minutes, Red Light Special (tofu); Eliminated 1st: Jody Brunori: Round 2: – Budget Battle ($18) – 30 minutes, Free Bacon; Eliminated 2nd: Rina Estero: Round 3: Flip The Dish – 30 minutes, Bacon and Egg Sandwich (Bacon, Eggs, English muffin, American sliced cheese); Eliminated 3rd: J.T. Thomas: Winner: Brad Leighninger ($20,000); Judges: Jet Tila, Beau MacMillian, Damaris Phillips
200	4	"Cheesiest"	March 14, 2018
Round 1: Signature Cheese Dish – 30 minutes, Wild Card Ingredient: (cheddar popcorn, cheesecake, cheese crackers, nacho cheese); Eliminated 1st: Jennifer Lutterell: Round 2: – Cheesy International Dish – 30 minutes, Seven continents, Nine item limit Express Lane; Eliminated 2nd: Glenda Murray: Round 3: Flip The Dish – 30 minutes, High End Cheese Dinner - Jalapeno Popper (Bread Crumbs, Jalapenos, Cream Cheese); Eliminated 3rd: Patrick Watson: Winner: Sharif Ball ($12,000); Judges: Damaris Phillips, Justin Warner, Rocco DiSpirito
201	5	"DDD All-Star Tournament Part 1"	March 18, 2018
Judges:
202	6	"Pizza Play-Offs"	March 21, 2018
Round 1: Traditional Pizza – 30 minutes, Traditional Pizza & Out of the Box Pizza: Pizza Box Shopping; Eliminated 1st: Diana Cline & Eliminated 2nd: Mark “Marco” Dym: Round 2: Sweet Pizza & Savory Pizza – 30 minutes - Red Light Special (Aisle 9: Peanut Butter or Jelly/Jam); Eliminated 3rd: Bob Marshall: Winner: Jay Westcott ($20,000); Judges: Antonia Lofaso, Rocco DiSpirito, Tony Gemignani
203	7	"DDD All-Star Tournament Part 2"	March 25, 2018
Judges:
204	8	"April Fools' Games"	March 28, 2018
Round 1: Personality on a Plate – 30 minutes, 3-Minute Shoplift; Best dish 1st: Justin Warner Eliminated 1st: neither chef: Round 2: Chef / Judge Swap – 30 minutes - Best Chicken Dish (ABC Game - “A” & “ F ”); Eliminated 2nd: Carl Ruiz & Aaron May: Winner: Justin Warner ($10,000); Judges: Aarti Sequeira, Damaris Phillips, Troy Johnson
205	9	"DDD All-Star Tournament Part 3"	April 1, 2018
Judges:
206	10	"DDD All-Star Tournament Part Finale"	April 8, 2018
Judges:
207	11	"Single Shop Showdown"	April 15, 2018
Round 1: $60 Budget Battle – 30 minutes - Lunch; Eliminated 1st: Kyia Faison: Round 2: International Dish – 30 minutes; Eliminated 2nd: Kevin Ouzts: Round 3: Refined Dinner – 30 minutes, Eliminated 3rd: Hunter Durgon: Winner: Jill Vedaa ($16,000); Judges: Jet Tila, Damaris Phillips, Rutledge Wood
208	12	"Over-the-Top Food Fest"	April 22, 2018
Round 1: Over the Top Dish – 30 minutes - Think Small; Eliminated 1st: Scott Nelowet: Round 2: Stacked & Jacked – 30 minutes - Let it Roll (4:00, torch, dried fruit); Eliminated 2nd: Andrew Isabella: Round 3: Late Night Decadence – 30 minutes, Grocery List; Eliminated 3rd: Mike Lasage: Winner: Tamra Eddy ($16,000); Judges: Justin Warner, Damaris Phillips, Jonathan Waxman
209	13	"GGG Kids"	April 29, 2018
Judges:
210	14	"Team Games"	May 6, 2018
Judges:
211	15	"GGG All-Stars and Their Moms"	May 13, 2018
Judges:

=== Season 18 (2018) ===
No. overall	No. in season	Title	Original release date
212	1	"GGG List Games"	May 16, 2018
Judges:
213	2	"Bigger Better Burgers"	May 23, 2018
Judges:
214	3	"All-Star Grocery Rush"	May 30, 2018
Judges:
215	4	"Food Network Star Duos"	June 6, 2018
Judges:
216	5	"DDD Dads and Their Kids"	June 13, 2018
Judges:
217	6	"Express Lane Extreme"	June 20, 2018
Judges:
218	7	"GGG's Salute to Summer"	June 27, 2018
Judges:
219	8	"Culinary Idols"	July 4, 2018
Judges:
220	9	"Sibling Duos"	July 11, 2018
Judges:
221	10	"Guy's Italian Games"	July 18, 2018
Judges:
222	11	"Family Food Feud"	July 25, 2018
Judges:
223	12	"Family Food Feud: Part 2"	July 25, 2018
Judges:
224	13	"Heavyweight Teams"	August 1, 2018
Judges:
225	14	"Supermarket Rematches"	August 8, 2018
Judges:
226	15	"Food Scientists"	August 15, 2018
Judges:
227	16	"Comfort Food Cook-Off"	August 22, 2018
Judges:
228	17	"Meals From the Middle Madness"	August 29, 2018
Judges:
229	18	"Everything from Scratch"	September 5, 2018
Judges:
230	19	"Global Grocery Games"	September 12, 2018
Judges:
231	20	"GGG Winners vs. Judges"	September 19, 2018
Judges:
232	21	"Flavortown Fright Night"	October 3, 2018
Judges:

=== Season 19 (2018–2019) ===
No. overall	No. in season	Title	Original release date
233	1	"First Round Redemption"	September 26, 2018
Judges:
234	2	"GGG Judges and Their Siblings"	October 10, 2018
Judges:
235	3	"Ultimate Chicken Challenge"	October 17, 2018
Judges:
236	4	"Super Spicy Superstars"	October 24, 2018
Judges:
237	5	"Pork-a-Palozza"	October 31, 2018
Judges:
238	6	"Family Food Feud Thanksgiving"	November 4, 2018
Judges:
239	7	"Teen Chefs"	November 7, 2018
Judges:
240	8	"Judges' Thanksgiving Showdown"	November 14, 2018
Judges:
241	9	"All-Seafood Battle"	November 28, 2018
Judges:
242	10	"GGG Winners' Holiday Extravaganza"	December 5, 2018
Judges:
243	11	"Ultimate Beef Battle"	December 12, 2018
Judges:
244	12	"$12 Meal Showdown"	December 19, 2018
Judges:
245	13	"DDD Family Tournament Part 1"	January 2, 2019
Judges:
246	14	"DDD Family Tournament Part 2"	January 9, 2019
Judges:
247	15	"DDD Family Tournament Part 3"	January 16, 2019
Judges:
248	16	"DDD Family Tournament Finale"	January 23, 2019
Judges:
249	17	"Big Game Day"	January 30, 2019
Judges:
250	18	"GGG Iron Chef Challenge"	February 6, 2019
Judges:
251	19	"Ultimate Protein Battle"	February 20, 2019
Judges:

=== Season 20 (2019) ===
No. overall	No. in season	Title	Original release date
252	1	"Clash of the Vegetarians!"	December 26, 2018
Judges:
253	2	"Cookin' Couples"	February 13, 2019
Judges:
254	3	"Big Cheese"	February 27, 2019
Judges:
255	4	"All Budget Wheel Games"	March 6, 2019
Judges:
256	5	"Five-Dollar Dishes"	March 13, 2019
Judges:
257	6	"Wild and Crazy Budget Games"	March 20, 2019
Judges:
258	7	"Five-Dollar Price Check"	March 27, 2019
Judges:
259	8	"Big Budget Bonanza"	April 3, 2019
Judges:
260	9	"GGG Winning Teams"	April 10, 2019
Judges:
261	10	"Pro Athletes and Judges"	April 17, 2019
Judges:
262	11	"Ultimate Grocery List"	April 24, 2019
Judges:
263	12	"Restaurant Teams"	May 1, 2019
Judges:
264	13	"DDD Chefs and Their Moms"	May 8, 2019
Judges:
265	14	"Best Sandwiches!"	May 15, 2019
Judges:
266	15	"All-Star Burgers"	May 22, 2019
Judges:
267	16	"Island Eats"	May 29, 2019
Judges:
268	17	"Home Cooks!"	June 5, 2019
Judges:
269	18	"GGG Winners and Their Dads"	June 12, 2019
Judges:
270	19	"All-Stars' Full Meal"	June 19, 2019
Judges:
271	20	"Kitchen Heroes"	June 26, 2019
Judges:
272	21	"DDD Family Redemption"	July 10, 2019
Judges:
273	22	"Southern Chef Showdown"	July 17, 2019
Judges:
274	23	"All ABC Games"	July 24, 2019
Judges:
275	24	"GGG Kids All-Stars"	July 31, 2019
Judges:
276	25	"Ultimate Asian Food Showdown"	August 7, 2019
Judges:
277	26	"Grandma Grocery Games"	August 14, 2019
Judges:

=== Season 21 (2019) ===
No. overall	No. in season	Title	Original release date
278	1	"Battle America"	August 21, 2019
Judges: Maneet Chauhan, Troy Johnson, Beau MacMillan
279	2	"Single-Aisle Showdowns"	August 28, 2019
Judges:
280	3	"Guy's Carnival Games"	September 4, 2019
Judges: Noah Cappe, G. Garvin, Antonia Lofaso
281	4	"Express Lane Extreme: Name Your Number"	September 11, 2019
Judges:
282	5	"Bacon Masters"	September 15, 2019
Judges:
283	6	"California Firefighters"	September 18, 2019
Judges: Aaron May (chef), Jamika Pessoa, Christian Petroni
284	7	"Ghosts of GGG Past"	September 25, 2019
Judges: Troy Johnson, Carl Ruiz, Antonia Lofaso
285	8	"Rematch Mania"	October 2, 2019
Judges: Eric Greenspan, Troy Johnson, Antonia Lofaso
286	9	"Fast Food Face-Off"	October 9, 2019
Judges:
287	10	"Ultimate Spicy Games"	October 16, 2020
Judges: Aaron May, Troy Johnson, Carl Ruiz
288	11	"12 Ingredients All Day"	October 23, 2019
Judges: Jet Tila, Simon Majumdar, Alex Guarnaschelli
289	12	"Food Truck Teams"	October 30, 2019
Judges: Mark Anderson, Ryan Fey, Antonia Lofaso
290	13	"Cheat Day"	November 6, 2019
Judges:

=== Season 22 (2019–2020) ===
No. overall	No. in season	Title	Original release date
291	1	"DDD Thanksgiving"	November 13, 2019
Judges: G. Garvin, Eric Greenspan, Jamika Pessoa
292	2	"Guy's Thanksgiving Games"	November 20, 2019
Judges: Christian Petroni, Beau MacMillan, Aarti Sequeira
293	3	"Guy's Holiday Dessert Games"	November 27, 2019
Judges: Maneet Chauhan, Damaris Phillips, Buddy Valastro
294	4	"Judges' Holiday: Ultimate Naughty List"	December 4, 2019
Four of GGG's beloved judges compete using Guy's naughty list ingredients. Judges: Eric Greenspan, Antonia Lofaso, Catherine McCord
295	5	"GGG Holiday Cook-Off"	December 11, 2019
Judges: Troy Johnson, Antonia Lofaso, Simon Majumdar
296	6	"Resolution Royale"	TBA
Judges:
297	7	"Guy's Guys"	December 25, 2019
Judges:
298	8	"New School vs. Old School"	December 29, 2019
Judges:
299	9	"Diners, Drive-Ins and Dives Tournament: GGG Super Teams Part 1"	January 1, 2020
Judges:
300	10	"Diners, Drive-Ins and Dives Tournament: GGG Super Teams Part 2"	January 8, 2020
Judges:
301	11	"Diners, Drive-Ins and Dives Tournament: GGG Super Teams Part 3"	January 15, 2020
Judges:
302	12	"Diners, Drive-Ins and Dives Tournament: GGG Super Teams Finale"	January 22, 2020
Judges:
303	13	"Game Day Super Teams"	January 29, 2020
Judges:
304	14	"Wicked Aisle Games"	January 29, 2020
Judges:

=== Season 23 (2020) ===
No. overall	No. in season	Title	Original release date
305	1	"Winner Winter Games"	February 5, 2020
Three previous GGG winners return to compete in Guy's winter-themed games. Judges: Antonia Lofaso, Damaris Phillips, Carl Ruiz
306	2	"World Fusion"	February 5, 2020
Judges: Aarti Sequeira, Ming Tsai, Justin Warner
307	3	"Married with Kitchen"	February 12, 2020
Judges:
308	4	"All Un-ingredients"	February 12, 2020
Judges:
309	5	"Scratch Chef Showdown"	February 19, 2020
Judges:
310	6	"High-Roller Games"	February 26, 2020
Judges:
311	7	"Pizza Pro Playoffs"	March 4, 2020
Judges:
312	8	"Guy's Trivia Games"	March 11, 2020
Judges:
313	9	"America's Next Chefs"	March 18, 2020
Judges:
314	10	"April Fool's Day"	March 25, 2020
Judges:
315	11	"Big League Teams"	April 8, 2020
Judges:
316	12	"Clearance Wars"	April 15, 2020
Judges:

=== Season 24 (2020) ===
No. overall	No. in season	Title	Original release date
317	1	"Guy's Eggs-treme Games"	April 22, 2020
Judges:
318	2	"DDD-licious Burgers"	April 29, 2020
Judges:
319	3	"Mother of All Shows"	May 6, 2020
Judges:
320	4	"Dessert Games"	May 13, 2020
Judges:
321	5	"Salute to the Troops"	May 20, 2020
Judges:
322	6	"Choose Your Budget"	May 27, 2020
Judges:
323	7	"One-Time Aisle Games"	June 3, 2020
Judges:
323	8	"Like Father, Like Chef"	June 17, 2020
Judges:
325	9	"Sweet and Savory Teams"	June 24, 2020
Judges:
326	10	"GGG RAW"	July 1, 2020
Judges:
327	11	"Summer Grillin' Games: Part 1"	July 8, 2020
Judges:
328	12	"Summer Grillin' Games: Part 2"	July 15, 2020
Judges:
329	13	"Summer Grillin' Games: Part 3"	July 22, 2020
Judges:
330	14	"Summer Grillin' Games: Part 4"	July 29, 2020
Judges:
331	15	"Summer Grillin' Games: Finale"	August 5, 2020
Judges:

=== Season 25 (2020–2021) ===
Delivery episodes made up the majority of this season – due to the COVID-19 pandemic in the United States, which made it impossible for chefs and judges to travel to the Flavortown Market set, due to the travel restrictions that were imposed.

No. overall	No. in season	Title	Original release date
332	1	"Guy's Global Games"	August 12, 2020
Judges:
333	2	"X-Treme ABC Games"	August 19, 2020
Judges:
334	3	"All-Star Vegetarian Games"	August 26, 2020
Judges:
335	4	"Ultimate Grocery List"	September 2, 2020
Judges:
336	5	"Grocery Rush"	September 9, 2020
Judges:
337	6	"All-Star Budget"	September 16, 2020
Judges:
339	7	"Nothin' but Noodles"	September 23, 2020
Judges:
340	8	"Battle of the Bacon"	September 30, 2020
Judges:
341	9	"Delivery: GGG at Home"	October 7, 2020
Judges:
342	10	"Delivery: Budget Games"	October 14, 2020
Judges:
343	11	"Delivery: Limitations"	October 21, 2020
Judges:
344	12	"Delivery: Mix-Up"	October 28, 2020
Judges:
345	13	"Delivery: Grillin' at Home"	November 11, 2020
Judges:
346	14	"Delivery: All-Star Thanksgiving"	November 18, 2020
Judges:
347	15	"Delivery: Home Sweet Home"	November 25, 2020
Judges:
348	16	"Delivery: Double Trouble"	December 2, 2020
Judges:
349	17	"Delivery: All-Star Holiday"	December 9, 2020
Judges:
350	18	"Delivery: All-Star Hanukkah"	December 16, 2020
Judges:
351	19	"Delivery: One Box Only"	December 23, 2020
Judges:
352	20	"Delivery: DDD OGs"	December 30, 2020
Judges:
353	21	"Delivery: Pantry-Palooza"	January 6, 2021
Judges:
354	22	"Delivery: All-Star Noodles"	January 13, 2021
Judges:
355	23	"Delivery: DDD Guilty Pleasures"	January 20, 2021
Judges:
356	24	"Delivery: High-End at Home"	January 27, 2021
Judges:

=== Season 26 (2021) ===
Delivery episodes made up the majority of this season.

No. overall	No. in season	Title	Original release date
356	1	"Delivery: Frozen Fiasco"	February 17, 2021
Judges:
357	2	"Delivery: Guilty Pleasures"	February 24, 2021
Judges:
358	3	"Delivery: Tournament of Champions"	March 4, 2021
Judges:
358	4	"Delivery: Big Bacon Blowout"	March 11, 2021
Judges:
359	5	"Delivery: Sandwich Showdown"	March 17, 2021
Judges:
360	6	"Delivery: April Fools'"	March 31, 2021
Judges:
361	7	"Delivery: All-Star Family Face-Off: Part 1"	April 7, 2021
Judges:
362	8	"Delivery: Delivery: All-Star Family Face-Off: Part 2"	April 14, 2021
Judges:
363	9	"Delivery: Delivery: All-Star Family Face-Off: Part 3"	April 21, 2021
Judges:
364	10	"Delivery: Delivery: All-Star Family Face-Off: Finale"	April 28, 2021
Judges:
365	11	"Delivery: Mom Cooks Best"	May 5, 2021
Judges:
366	12	"Delivery: Backyard Burgers"	May 19, 2021
Judges:
367	13	"Delivery: Takeout Takedown"	June 2, 2021
Judges:
368	14	"Delivery: All-Stars Shop and Cook"	June 9, 2021
Judges:
369	15	"Delivery: Exotic Meats"	June 16, 2021
Judges:
370	16	"Grand Reopening: Part 1"	June 23, 2021
Judges: Aaron May, Aarti Sequiera, Rocco DiSpirito
371	17	"Grand Reopening: Part 2"	June 30, 2021
Judges: Aaron May, Aarti Sequiera, Rocco DiSpirito

=== Season 27 (2021) ===
No. overall	No. in season	Title	Original release date
372	1	"DDD Summer Games, Part 1: Backyard Bash"	July 7, 2021
Judges: Aaron May, G. Garvin, and Nancy Silverton
373	2	"DDD Summer Games, Part 2: Extreme Tailgating"	July 14, 2021
Judges: Christian Petroni, Maneet Chauhan, and G. Garvin
374	3	"DDD Summer Games, Part 3: Camp Cook-Off"	July 21, 2021
Judges: Christian Petroni, Ming Tsai, and Nancy Silverton
375	4	"DDD Summer Games Finale"	July 28, 2021
Judges:
376	5	"Food Network Star Favorites"	July 28, 2021
Judges:
377	6	"All-Star Egg-stravaganza"	August 4, 2021
Judges:
378	7	"Rush to Redemption"	August 11, 2021
Judges:
379	8	"Firefighter Face-Off"	August 18, 2021
Judges:
380	9	"Snack Attack"	September 1, 2021
Judges:
381	10	"Fried Feud"	September 8, 2021
Judges:
382	11	"Bigger, Badder Budget Battle"	September 12, 2021
Judges:
383	12	"All-Star Delivery Nightmare"	September 15, 2021
Judges:
384	13	"All-Star Vegetarian"	September 22, 2021
Judges:

=== Season 28 (2021) ===
No. overall	No. in season	Title	Original release date
385	1	"Delivery: Cheese Mania"	September 29, 2021
Judges:
386	2	"Flavortown's Big Move"	October 13, 2021
Judges:
387	3	"Flavortown 2.0"	October 20, 2021
Four chefs christen the newly redesigned and revamped Flavortown market. Judges: Jet Tila, Catherine McCord, Troy Johnson
388	4	"ABC Mania"	October 27, 2021
Judges: Darnell Ferguson, Antonia Lofaso, Richard Blais
389	5	"Extreme Frozen Games"	November 3, 2021
Judges: Jet Tila, Antonia Lofaso, Justin Warner
390	6	"Thankful for Flavortown"	November 17, 2021
Judges: Darnell Ferguson, Maneet Chauhan, Hunter Fieri
391	7	"Fruit Fest"	November 24, 2021
Judges: Michael Voltaggio, Maneet Chauhan, Scott Conant
392	8	"Fieri Family Holiday Showdown"	December 15, 2021
Judges:

=== Season 29 (2022) ===
No. overall	No. in season	Title	Original release date
393	1	"Winner Winner Chicken Dinner"	January 5, 2022
Judges:
394	2	"Anti-Resolution Games"	January 12, 2022
Judges:
395	3	"Global Food Fanatics"	January 19, 2022
Judges: Troy Johnson, Aarti Sequeira, and Jeff Mauro
396	4	"Sinful Sandwiches"	January 26, 2022
Judges: Troy Johnson, Jeff Mauro, and Nyesha Arrington
397	5	"Host with the Most"	February 2, 2022
Judges: Rocco DiSpirito, Aarti Sequeira, and Chris Cosentino
398	6	"DDD Champs"	February 16, 2022
Judges: Simon Majumdar, Tiffani Faison, and Justin Warner
399	7	"Food Network Champs"	February 23, 2022
Judges: Justin Warner, Tiffani Faison, and Simon Majumdar
400	8	"Craziest Day in Flavortown"	March 16, 2022
Judges:
401	9	"DDD International"	March 23, 2022
Judges:
402	10	"April Fools' Rules"	March 30, 2022
Judges:
403	11	"Comedy Couples Cookoff"	April 13, 2022
Judges:
404	12	"Night on the Flavortown"	April 20, 2022
Judges:
405	13	"Supermoms"	May 4, 2022
Judges:
406	14	"Winner's World Cup"	May 11, 2022
Judges:

=== Season 30 (2022) ===
No. overall	No. in season	Title	Original release date
407	1	"Burgers or Bust"	May 25, 2022
Judges:
408	2	"DDD Dads"	June 8, 2022
Judges:
409	3	"Food Truck Teams"	June 15, 2022
Judges:
410	4	"Pizza Masters"	June 29, 2022
Judges:
411	5	"Guy's Summer Games 1"	July 6, 2022
Judges:
412	6	"Guy's Summer Games 2"	July 13, 2022
Judges:
413	7	"Guy's Summer Games 3"	July 20, 2022
Judges:
414	8	"Guy's Summer Games 4"	July 27, 2022
Judges:
415	9	"Guy's Summer Games Finale"	August 3, 2022
Judges:
416	10	"Cooking the Books"	August 17, 2022
Food Blogger Heather Johnson was featured in Episode 10. The Food Hussy as she's better known (spoiler alert) won her episode with a spin on her loose meat sandwiches. The episode was called "Cooking the Books" and all four home chefs were Guy Fieri superfans and cooked recipes from Guy Fieri's cookbooks. Judges:
417	11	"GGG Meets Chopped"	September 28, 2022
Judges:
418	12	"Supermarket of Mischief"	October 5, 2022
Judges:

=== Season 31 (2022–2023) ===
No. overall	No. in season	Title	Original release date
419	1	"Fieri Thanksgiving Party"	November 16, 2022
Judges:
420	2	"DDD Redemption"	November 23, 2022
Judges:
421	3	"Dessert Games"	December 7, 2022
Judges:
422	4	"Holiday Hustle"	December 14, 2022
Judges:
423	5	"Beat the Judges: Bacon"	January 4, 2023
Judges:
424	6	"Beat the Judges: Vegetarian"	January 11, 2023
Judges:
425	7	"Beat the Judges: Sandwiches"	January 18, 2022
Judges:
426	8	"Beat the Judges: Cheesy"	January 25, 2022
Judges:
427	9	"Beat the Judges: Spicy"	February 1, 2023
Judges:

=== Season 32 (2023) ===
No. overall	No. in season	Title	Original release date
428	1	"GGG Winners' Face-Off"	February 8, 2023
Judges:
429	2	"Flavortown Food Network Champs"	February 15, 2023
Judges:
430	3	"Super Seafood Showdown"	March 8, 2023
Judges:
431	4	"All-Star ABC"	March 22, 2023
Judges:
432	5	"All-Star Rush"	March 29, 2023
Judges:
433	6	"Family Teams"	April 12, 2023
Judges:
434	7	"Wine Country Chefs"	April 19, 2023
Judges:
435	8	"GGG Eggs-travaganza"	April 26, 2023
Judges:
436	9	"Mother of All Winners"	May 10, 2023
Judges:
437	10	"GGG Redemption"	May 17, 2023
Judges:
438	11	"Burger Ballers"	May 24, 2023
Judges:

=== Season 33 (2023) ===
No. overall	No. in season	Title	Original release date
439	1	"DDD Guilty Pleasures"	June 7, 2023
Judges:
440	2	"Home Cook Dads"	June 14, 2023
Judges:
441	3	"Sweet Deception All-Stars"	June 21, 2023
Judges:
442	4	"Flavortown Auction"	June 28, 2023
Judges:
443	5	"All-Star Frozen Freak-Out"	July 5, 2023
Judges:
444	6	"Teaching Teams"	July 12, 2023
Judges:
445	7	"The GGG Experience"	July 19, 2023
Judges:
446	8	"All-Star Double Whammy"	July 26, 2023
Judges:
447	9	"DDD All Day"	August 2, 2023
Judges:
448	10	"Winner, Winner, One Big Dinner"	August 9, 2023
Judges:

=== Season 34 (2023) ===
No. overall	No. in season	Title	Original release date
449	1	"All-Star Invitational, Part 1"	August 16, 2023
Judges:
450	2	"All-Star Invitational, Part 2"	August 23, 2023
Judges:
451	3	"All-Star Invitational, Part 3"	August 30, 2023
Judges:
452	4	"All-Star Invitational, Part 4"	September 6, 2023
Judges:
453	5	"All-Star Invitational Finale"	September 13, 2023
Judges:
454	6	"Meatless Marvels"	September 20, 2023
Judges:
455	7	"GGG Tiebreakers"	September 27, 2023
Judges:
456	8	"Firefighters in Flavortown"	October 4, 2023
Judges:
457	9	"All-Star Teaching Teams"	October 11, 2023
Judges:
458	10	"Wilderness Chefs"	October 18, 2023
Judges:
459	11	"Beat the Judges: International"	October 25, 2023
Judges:
460	12	"All-Star Game Day Relay"	November 1, 2023
Judges:

=== Season 35 (2023–2024) ===
No. overall	No. in season	Title	Original release date
461	1	"Flavortown Academy: Antonia vs. Jet, Part 1"	November 8, 2023
Judges:
462	2	"Flavortown Academy: Antonia vs. Jet, Part 2"	November 15, 2023
Judges:
463	3	"Flavortown Academy: Antonia vs. Jet, Part 3"	November 22, 2023
Judges:
464	4	"Flavortown Academy: Antonia vs. Jet, Part 4"	November 29, 2023
Judges:
465	5	"Flavortown Academy: Antonia vs. Jet Finals"	December 6, 2023
Judges:
466	6	"GGG Best Buddies Holiday Special"	December 13, 2023
Judges:
467	7	"One-Stop Speed Shop"	January 3, 2024
Judges:
468	8	"Relay: Winners vs. Judges"	January 10, 2024
Judges:
469	9	"All-Star Alphabet Auction"	January 17, 2024
Judges:
470	10	"DDD Seafood"	January 24, 2024
Judges:
471	11	"10 Pounds, Two Rounds"	January 31, 2024
Judges:

=== Season 36 (2024) ===
No. overall	No. in season	Title	Original release date
472	1	"Food Truck Families"	February 21, 2024
Judges:
473	2	"Relay: All-Star Moms vs. Dads"	February 28, 2024
Judges:
474	3	"DDD Vegan"	March 6, 2024
Judges:
475	4	"Guilty Pleasure Wheels"	March 13, 2024
Judges:
476	5	"Winners' Whammy Auction"	March 20, 2024
Judges:
477	6	"Relay: Ultimate Face-Off"	March 27, 2024
Judges:
478	7	"Red Light Special Extravaganza"	April 3, 2024
Judges:
479	8	"Best Burgers"	April 10, 2024
Judges:
480	9	"DDD Budget Battle"	April 17, 2024
Judges:
481	10	"Hunter's Whammy Cart"	April 24, 2024
Judges:

=== Season 37 (2024) ===
No. overall	No. in season	Title	Original release date
482	1	"All-Star Relay Rumble: Part 1"	September 4, 2024
Judges:
483	2	"All-Star Relay Rumble: Part 2"	September 11, 2024
Judges:
484	3	"All-Star Relay Rumble: Part 3"	September 18, 2024
Judges:
485	4	"All-Star Relay Rumble: Part 4"	September 25, 2024
Judges:
486	5	"All-Star Relay Rumble: Finale"	October 2, 2024
Judges:
487	6	"Discount Dinners: Beat the Judges"	October 9, 2024
Judges:
488	7	"Beat the Judges: Express Lane"	October 16, 2024
Judges:
489	8	"Bad to The Bacon"	October 23, 2024
Judges:
490	9	"All-Star Grocery Rush-a-Thon"	October 9, 2024
Judges:
491	10	"Dinner For Dollars"	November 6, 2024
Judges:
492	11	"DDD-elicious"	November 13, 2024
Judges:

=== Season 38 (2025) ===
No. overall	No. in season	Title	Original release date
493	1	"GGG New Stars"	January 8, 2025
Judges:
494	2	"Masters of Cheese"	January 15, 2025
Judges:
495	3	"All-Star All Swap"	January 22, 2025
Judges:
496	4	"Game Day Bite Fight"	January 29, 2025
Judges:
497	5	"City food fight: LA vs. SF"	February 5, 2025
Judges:
498	6	"City food fight: CHI vs. NYC"	February 12, 2025
Judges:
499	7	"Ultimate City Food Fight"	February 19, 2025
Judges: Aaron May, Damaris Phillips, Tobias Dorzon
500	8	"Culinary Call-Outs"	February 26, 2025
Judges: Stephanie Izard, Eric Greenspan, Antonia Lofaso
501	9	"Beat the Judges: Frozen Feast"	March 5, 2025
Judges: Eric Greenspan, Stephanie Izard, Mei Lin
502	10	"Three-Course Couples"	March 12, 2025
Judges: Aarti Sequeira, Dale Talde, Ilan Hall

=== Season 39 (2025) ===
No. overall	No. in season	Title	Original release date
503	01	"Guy Favorites"	March 26, 2025
Judges:
504	02	"Baseball Stadium Food Fight"	April 2, 2025
Judges:
505	03	"Meatless Marvels"	April 9, 2025
Judges:
506	04	"All-Star Fruit!"	April 16, 2025
Judges:
507	05	"DDD: Sandwiches"	April 23, 2025
Judges:
508	06	"Friend or Foe"	April 30, 2025
Judges:
509	07	"The G.O.A.T Tournament Pt 1"	May 7, 2025
Judges: Troy Johnson, Marcus Samuelsson, Cat Cora
510	08	"The G.O.A.T Tournament Pt 2"	May 14, 2025
Judges: Troy Johnson, Marcus Samuelsson, Cat Cora
511	09	"The G.O.A.T Tournament Pt 3"	May 21, 2025
Judges: Troy Johnson, Tiffani Faison, Jet Tila
512	10	"The G.O.A.T Tournament Pt 4"	May 28, 2025
Judges: Troy Johnson, Tiffani Faison, Jonathon Sawyer
513	11	"The G.O.A.T Tournament Finale"	June 4, 2025
The three finalists search the Flavortown Market for envelopes that reveal the different games they must play – either ABC, Budget Battle or Think Small – while making their best chicken dinner. Then, the best two chefs face off in a final battle by making a celebration dinner with only four minutes to shop, but Guy Fieri has one last surprise – the dreaded cart swap! The chef who ultimately makes the best dinner using their opponent's groceries earns the GGG Greatest of All Time trophy and GGG's biggest prize: $70,000. Judges: Troy Johnson, Tiffani Faison, Jonathon Sawyer

=== Season 40 (2025) ===
No. overall	No. in season	Title	Original release date
514	01	"Beat the Judges: Non-stop Noodles"	June 18, 2025
Guy Fieri welcomes three chefs whose noodle mastery helped them win GGG in the past to take on each other in a non-stop noodle event. First, the chefs make their signature noodle dish featuring an item from a surprise section of the store indicated by their chosen pool noodle. The winner earns an automatic $15,000 and gets a shot at turning their prize money into $20,000 if they can beat the GGG judge of their choice in an ultimate comfort noodle cook-off. Judges: Tiffani Faison, Shota Nakajima, Dan Pashman, Mei Lin
515	02	"Beat the Judges: Burger Masters"	June 25, 2025
Guy Fieri invites three of the best burger chefs to prove they're the "Big Burger Master" by outcooking each other before taking on an elite GGG judge. First, the chefs must make their signature burger and side featuring a surprise red light special: canned corn! The winner earns an automatic $15,000 and a shot at earning up to $5,000 more if they can beat the GGG judge of their choice in a showstopping burger battle, featuring the ingredients they choose in a food draft pick. Judges: Aaron May, Antonia Lofaso, Beau MacMillan, Adam Sobel
516	03	"Super Spicy Games"	July 9, 2025
Four spice-obsessed chefs are bringing the heat in GGG's most outrageous spicy competition ever. First, the chefs make a hometown spicy dish that has the overheated judges begging for mercy. Then, Guy Fieri challenges the competitors to create an upscale spicy dinner featuring ingredients chosen from a pyramid of fire, and the judges decide to turn the tables. Ultimately, the best chef gets up to $20,000, and Guy gets the last laugh. Judges: Justin Warner, Antonia Lofaso, Troy Johnson
517	04	"Dessert Deception"	July 16, 2025
Guy Fieri divides six savory chefs up into teams of three as they work alone in 10-minute shifts to create a winning plate of food. The first shift chefs are given a grocery list featuring breakfast sandwich ingredients, but in a surprise twist, the chefs must use those ingredients to make dessert. At the 10-minute mark, the first shift chefs go into soundproof boxes, where they can communicate the dish's dessert secret non-verbally by holding up quick doodles. Ultimately, the team that creates the best dessert will go on a relay shopping spree worth up to $15,000! Judges: Catherine McCord, Leah Cohen, Chris Cosentino
518	05	"Two Ingredients Per Aisle All Day"	July 23, 2025
Judges: Maneet Chauhan, Tiffani Faison, Scott Conant
519	06	"One Dish Redemption"	August 6, 2025
Four chefs who fell short of victory their first time around are back to cook a redemption dinner, but first, the dreaded Food Pyramid selects the whammy item, piece of equipment, and the odd or even aisles the chefs must shop to succeed. Meanwhile, Guy Fieri goes behind the scenes to reveal Flavortown secrets, including the workings of this real-deal grocery store inside a sound stage. Ultimately, one chef will win redemption and finally get the chance to shop Flavortown Market for up to $20,000. Judges: Catherine McCord, Tiffani Faison, Aarti Sequeira
520	07	"Sweet & Savory Superstars"	August 13, 2025
For the first time ever, Guy Fieri invites three savory winners and three dessert winners to pair up for a battle between sweet and savory super teams. The randomly selected teams have just one hour to make a sweet and savory appetizer, an upscale dinner, and dessert using only a single basket of groceries. Plus, the teams will have to pick an unlabeled can and use its mystery ingredient in their final dishes. The winning duo will earn up to $20,000. Judges: Catherine McCord, Tiffani Faison, Aarti Sequeira
521	08	"All-Star Pizza"	August 20, 2025
Guy Fieri invites all-star chefs Maneet Chauhan, Christian Petroni, Adam Sobel, and Stephanie Izard for a pizza showdown that's hard to top! First, the elite pie makers must serve up a pizzeria combo plate using only the grocery items they can carry on a pizza paddle in one trip. Then, the chefs must stretch their cash more than their dough to prepare two budget battle pizzas, one savory and one sweet. The winning pizza maestro will shop at Flavortown Market for up to $20,000. Judges: Beau MacMillan, Antonia Lofaso, Aarti Sequeira
522	09	"DDD Legends Tournament Part 1"	August 27, 2025
Guy Fieri invites eight of Diners, Drive-Ins, and Dives' best chefs to compete to become the first-ever DDD Legends Champion. The chefs must conquer five culinary stops on Guy's virtual Flavortown 500 racecourse, starting with Guilty Pleasure Place. Using a hubcap as a shopping basket, the competitors who manage to prepare a judge-pleasing guilty pleasure will continue their race for the $30,000 grand prize. The chef ranked last is instantly eliminated from the competition. Judges: Mei Lin, Eric Greenspan, Aarti Sequeira
523	10	"DDD Legends Tournament Part 2"	August 27, 2025
Seven of Diners, Drive-Ins, and Dives' best chefs are still in the running to become the first DDD Legends Champion. The next stop on Guy Fieri's Flavortown 500 racecourse is Breakfast Boulevard, and the chefs who succeed in making a baller brunch, despite having to detour around the eggs, bacon, and potato displays, get to continue their race for the $30,000 prize. The bottom two chefs must flip a list of iconic brunch ingredients into a weeknight dinner in the sudden-death elimination round. Judges: Mei Lin, Eric Greenspan, Aarti Sequeira
524	11	"DDD Legends Tournament Part 3"	September 10, 2025
Guy Fieri pairs the remaining six Diners, Drive-Ins, and Dives' chefs into teams to navigate Flavortown's Budget Bridge. Each cooking duo is given under $20 to create a classic food duo. The top two duos continue their race for the $30,000 grand prize, while the bottom duo faces off in a seafood dinner budget battle in the elimination round. Judges: Mei Lin, Rocco Dispirito, Aarti Sequeira
525	12	"DDD Legends Tournament Part 4"	September 17, 2025
The five remaining Diners, Drive-Ins, and Dives' chefs take on the next stop in Guy Fieri's Flavortown 500 race, Takeout Turnpike. The three chefs who make the best burger and side, using only nine ingredients, continue on to the finale. In the elimination round, the bottom two chefs must shop fast and furious for ingredients to make takeout noodles before closing time to earn the last spot in the finale worth $30,000! Judges: Aaron May, Rocco Dispirito, Aarti Sequeira
526	13	"DDD Legends Tournament Finale"	September 25, 2025
It's a race to the finish for the final four Diners, Drive-Ins, and Dives' chefs vying to become the first-ever DDD Legends Champion. First, Guy Fieri asks the chefs to make an updated diner classic with fruit they grab at "roadside stands" throughout the market. Then, the three best chefs must prepare a dinner of champions using one ingredient from every aisle of the store. The winner receives the Grand Champion Trophy and the $30,000 grand prize! Judges: Aaron May, Catherine McCord, Aarti Sequeira

=== Season 41 (2026) ===
No. overall	No. in season	Title	Original release date
526	01	"Ultimate Redemption"	January 21, 2026
Three acclaimed chefs who suffered a tough loss in Flavortown Market are back in pursuit of ultimate redemption. Since all three were defeated in a pork challenge, Guy Fieri tasks them with making a redemption pork dish using only the ingredients they can carry in their bare hands. Then, the final two chefs must shop for one ingredient per aisle to make a winning upscale dinner. The winner gets to redeem their victory for up to $20,000. Judges: Michael Voltaggio, Stephanie Izard, Tobias Dorzon
527	02	"New Food Stars"	January 28, 2026
Guy Fieri welcomes three up-and-coming food stars with big social media followings to take part in a viral-worthy culinary competition. First, the competitors try to make a big first impression by preparing their signature dish using only the ingredients they can fit in a tiny shopping bag. Then, the two final digital-age stars must go low-tech and make a dish determined by food magnets on a fridge. The winning online star will earn big bucks, and we're not talking cryptocurrency! Judges: Jet Tila, Catherine McCord, Christian Petroni
528	03	"Extreme Express Lane"	February 5, 2026
The culinary skills of all-star chefs Shota Nakajima, Adam Sobel, and Britt Rescigno are tested to the limit in the most extreme express lane challenge ever. Guy Fieri gives the chefs one hour to make an upscale appetizer, entree, and dessert using a total of only 12 ingredients! The winner gets to shop Flavortown Market for up to $20,000. Judges: Jonathon Sawyer, Stephanie Izard, Troy Johnson
529	04	"Guilty Pleasure Masters"	February 18, 2026
Guy Fieri welcomes three GGG winners known for their craveable dishes and asks them to make their signature guilty pleasure using a maximum of 7 pounds of ingredients. What the chefs don't know is this is winner-take-all challenge, and two of the chefs are eliminated, while the winner earns an automatic $15,000. Plus, the winning chef is given a chance to earn even more money if they can outcook the judge of their choice in a decadent dinner challenge featuring the whammy ingredient of their choice. Judges: Britt Rescigno, Stephanie Izard, Michael Voltaggio, Troy Johnson
530	05	"Food Family Takeover"	February 25, 2026
Three restaurant crews featuring family members and longtime employees who are practically family are competing to prove they cook it best. And Guy Fieri's son Hunter is also on hand to prove he can host it best. First, the food family teams must make a weeknight family favorite that includes some of the Fieri family's favorite ingredients. Then, the members of the final two families must each shop a different section of the store to make a winning Sunday supper. Ultimately, the winning family shops together for up to $20,000. Judges: Aarti Sequeira, Damaris Phillips, Crista Luedtke

=== Season 42 (2026) ===
No. overall	No. in season	Title	Original release date
531	01	"Fan Write-In"	June 10, 2026
Four unsuspecting chefs play games picked by GGG fans. Judges: Justin Warner, Damaris Phillips, Brian Malarkey
532	02	"Best Noodle Ever"	June 17, 2026
Chefs Joe Sasto, Lee Anne Wong, and Justin Warner battle over noodles. Judges: Mei Lin, Rocco Dispirito, Antonia Lofaso
533	03	"Beat the Judges: Grill Masters"	June 24, 2026
Three grill masters battle each other and a GGG judge in an epic grill-off. Judges: Christian Petroni, Stephanie Izard, Maneet Chauhan, Brian Malarkey
534	04	"Red, White, and Food"	July 1, 2026
Three chefs celebrate America's birthday with a star-spangled cook-off. Judges: Troy Johnson, Mei Lin, Rocco Dispirito
535	05	"GGG Global Games Part 1"	July 7, 2026
Eight all-stars masters of world cuisines compete for $50,000 grand prize. Judges: Antonia Lofaso, Aaron May, Maneet Chauhan
536	06	"GGG Global Games Part 2"	July 15, 2026
The chefs must make international fried dish with Haitian peanut butter. Judges: Antonia Lofaso, Aaron May, Maneet Chauhan
537	07	"GGG Global Games Part 3"	July 22, 2026
Six chefs are still in the running for the GGG Global Games $50,000 prize. Judges: Tiffani Faison, Adam Sobel, Maneet Chauhan
537	08	"GGG Global Games Part 4"	July 29, 2026
The remaining chefs make a seafood dinner and a hot-cold duo. Judges: Tiffani Faison, Jonathon Sawyer, Maneet Chauhan
538	09	"GGG Global Games Finale"	August 5, 2026
The final two chefs make a country-defining entree and desert. Judges: Tiffani Faison, Jonathon Sawyer, Maneet Chauhan
539	10	"Firefighters & All-Stars"	August 12, 2026
Firefighters team up with all-star chefs to win up to $20,000. Judges: Damaris Phillips, Jonathon Sawyer, Maneet Chauhan
540	11	"GGG Callouts"	August 19, 2026
Two chefs call out the all-star chefs that played a part in their GGG loss. Judges: Damaris Phillips, Dale Talde, Ilan Hall
541	12	"Throwback Throwdown"	August 26, 2026
The first winners of GGG are back to compete for up to $20,000. Judges: Jet Tila, Catherine McCord, Troy Johnson
542	13	"Food Fanatic Teams"	September 2, 2026
Three foodies with big online following team up with all-star chefs. Judges: Joe Sasto, Catherine McCord, Christian Petroni
