= Eric Greenspan =

American chef

Eric Greenspan is an American chef.

In 2007, Greenspan opened The Foundry on Melrose Avenue in Los Angeles. That year it was nominated by the James Beard Foundation as one of the Best New Restaurants in America.

In 2015, Greenspan appeared on the Travel Channel show Man Finds Food, where host Adam Richman visited his grilled cheese-focused restaurant, Greenspan's Grilled Cheese.

In 2018, Greenspan published The Great Grilled Cheese Book: Grown-Up Recipes for a Childhood Classic.

In 2025, Greenspan became the head chef of the Tesla Diner in Los Angeles. Greenspan left Tesla Diner in November 2025 to focus on opening up a planned Jewish deli. The deli, Mish Deli, opened on June 2, 2026.

Chef Greenspan often appears on Guy's Grocery Games as a judge, though he has also competed on the show.
