= Adam Sobel =

American academic

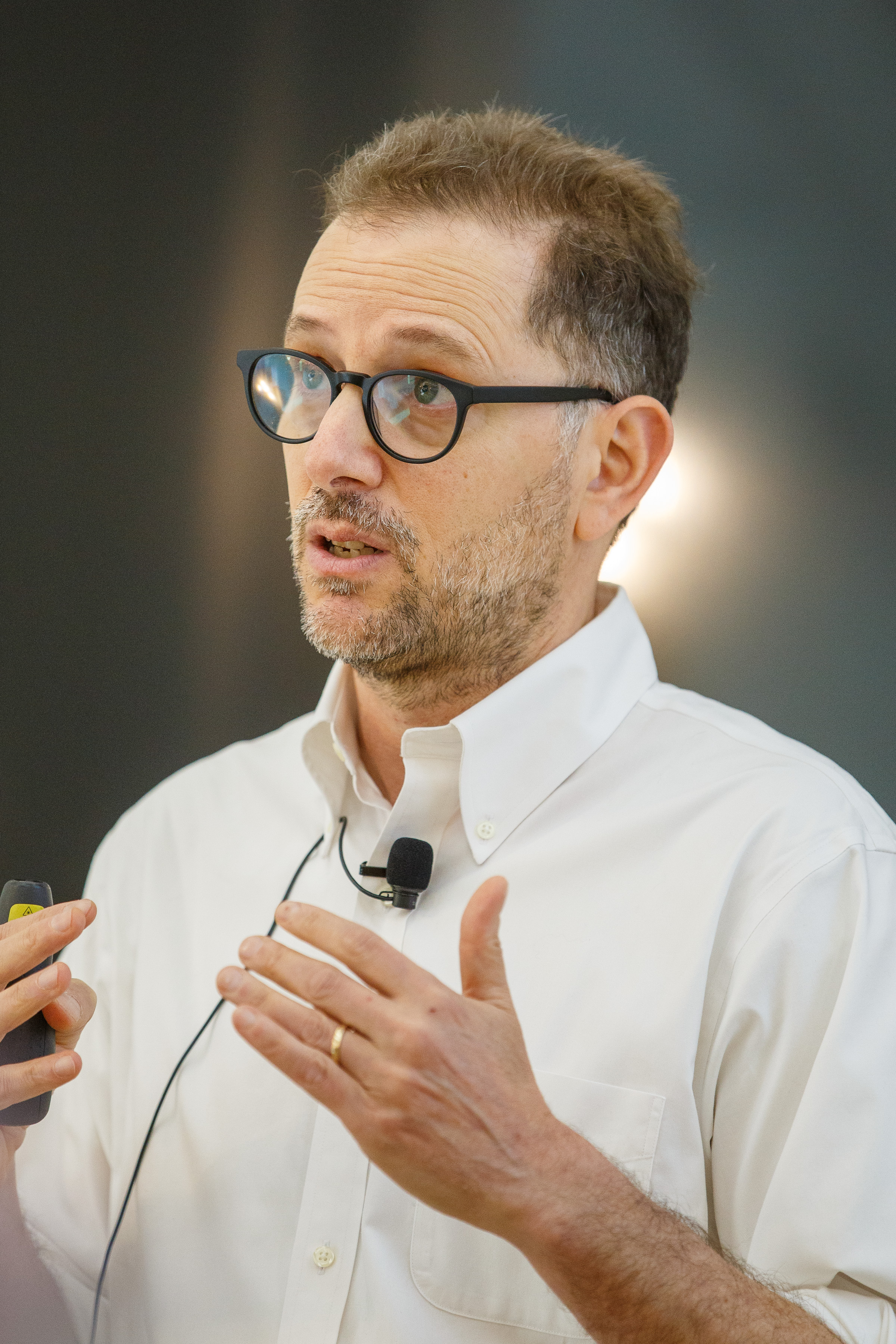
Sobel in 2025

Adam H. Sobel (born 1967) is a Professor of Applied Physics and Applied Mathematics and of Earth and Environmental Sciences at Columbia University. He directs its Initiative on Extreme Weather and Climate. His research area is meteorology with a focus on atmospheric and climate dynamics, tropical meteorology, and extreme weather.

He obtained his PhD at the Massachusetts Institute of Technology in 1998 and won the American Geophysical Union Atmospheric Science Section Ascent Award in 2014.

Along with Tapio Schneider, he co-edited the review book The Global Circulation of the Atmosphere (2007). He was also featured in the 2012 NOVA documentary "Inside the Megastorm" about Hurricane Sandy, and later published the book Storm Surge: Hurricane Sandy, Our Changing Climate, and Extreme Weather of the Past and Future (2014). Overall his publications have been cited over 10,000 times, and he has an h-index of 82 as of October 2025.
