= Troy Johnson (writer) =

American writer (born 1973)

Troy M. Johnson
- Born: August 13, 1973 (age 53); San Diego, California, U.S.
- Other name: Troy "The Boy" Johnson
- Education: California State University, Chico
- Occupations: TV personality/judge, food critic, author, writer
- Children: 2
- Website: heytroyjohnson.com

Troy Johnson (born August 13, 1973) is a writer, food critic, and television personality from San Diego. He has been on several Food Network shows as a panelist and a judge on Iron Chef America and The Best Thing I Ever Ate. He is best known as a judge on the Food Network show Guy's Grocery Games since its inception in 2013 and Campus Eats on the Big Ten Network since 2016. He previously hosted Crave which was also on the Food Network, an award-winning music show in San Diego called Fox Rox, and a San Diego Padres pregame show entitled Outta Left Field.

== Early life and education ==
Johnson was raised in Rancho Peñasquitos, a suburb of San Diego, and attended Mt. Carmel High School. He graduated in 1997 from California State University, Chico with a bachelor's degree in speech communications and poetry.

== Career ==
After college, he began writing as a music journalist where from 2002 to 2007 he was the music editor of the San Diego CityBeat. During that time he wrote pieces for Billboard and Spin. He has also written articles for magazines such as Surfer, Rolling Stone, Mojo and Paper. He also wrote and hosted a San Diego TV show about indie rock called Fox Rox, which ran from 2001 to 2007. The show garnered a number of local Emmy Awards.

In 2008 when both shows were cancelled, lifestyle publication Riviera Magazine gave Johnson the opportunity to write about food. The next three years were spent editing the award-winning food critic. That time was also spent cultivating his palate, studying flash cards, and talking to chefs. When that critic left, the opportunity to presented itself to become the next food critic. His first editorial of a local Italian restaurant impressed the editorial staff. It also won Best in Show for the San Diego Press Club.

In 2010, Johnson responded to a Food Network blog searching for hosts and submitted a six minute long audition tape. In 2011, he wrote and hosted the culinary travel series, filming nine episodes in six weeks. Crave aired in August 2011 on the Food Network. After two seasons and declining ratings, the show was cancelled. Later in 2011, he became the food and restaurant editor-at-large and dining critic for San Diego Magazine.

After becoming a fan favorite on Crave and it being the number two show in reruns on Fridays, the Food Network asked Johnson to become a judge on Guy's Grocery Games which started in 2013. He is still a rotating judge. He has published a book about growing up with a lesbian mother, titled Family Outing.

== Filmography ==
Television
Year	Title	Role	Notes
2001–2007	Fox Rox	Host	
2006–2007	Outta Left Field	Host	
2010	Crave	Host	Writer
2010–2011	The Best Thing I Ever Ate	Himself	3 episodes
2012	The Best Thing Since Sliced Bread	Himself	
2012	Extreme Chef	Judge	Season 2 episode 3: "Desert Survival"
2013	Summer Snacks	Food Expert	TV show, 1 season, also called "All You Can Eat"
2013	Iron Chef America	Judge	Season 11 episode 9: "Bobby Flay vs. Hong Thaimee: Tamarind"
2013–present	Guy's Grocery Games	Judge	92 episodes Contestant on season 11 episode 9: "Joy to the Judge"
2016–present	Campus Eats	Co-host	Writer
2019	Diners, Drive-Ins and Dives	Himself	Season 30 episode 2: "A World of Barbecue"; Restaurant: Grand Ole BBQ
