= Connie Ruel =

American restaurateur, writer and food and wine instructor

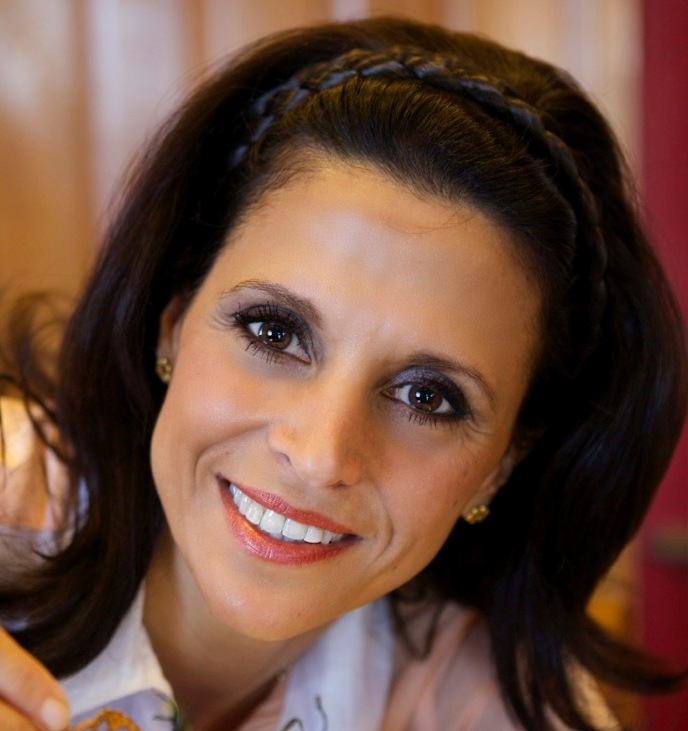
- Born: Constance D'Amore
- Occupations: Restaurateur writer Food / Wine Instructor
- Website: Connie Ruel official website

Connie Ruel is an American restaurateur, writer, and food and wine instructor. She is the author of the book Passions of a Restaurateur: Three generations of restaurant stories and the recipes they inspired which documents her career in the culinary industry as well as her family's involvement in the food and film industries. She has been featured in national and local food publications and appeared on the Food Network.

== Early life and education ==
Ruel was born in 1960 as Constance Jean D'Amore and is the daughter of Franklyn D'Amore, who with his brother Patsy D'Amore were best known for their work in film and as restaurateurs in California. She is a first generation American who grew up in her family's restaurants, most notably Casa D'Amore and The Villa Capri. Ruel moved to Switzerland where she studied under various chefs in the food and wine industry. Returning to the United States in 1988 she managed various hotel and restaurants in Portland, Oregon where she worked with some of the top area chefs including Greg Higgins and Phillip Boulot.

== Career ==
In early 1990, Ruel took a position as the hospitality director at Sokol Blosser Winery, a pioneering winery in Yamhill County, Oregon. Part of her position included appearing as a speaker at wine festivals throughout the United States. In 1998, Ruel ventured out on her own, opening and managing a string of restaurants, including Laslow's Broadway Bistro, Laslow's Northwest, and Malanga Cocina Cubana. All three were destination eateries in the Portland area and earned her awards and recognition that included America's Best Restaurants and 2002 Restaurant of the Year. It was during her time in Portland that she established herself in the culinary industry, judging professional wine competitions and representing her restaurants at the James Beard House. Ruel was known as having "one of the Northwest's best palates," a title given to her by The Oregonian in 2003.

Ruel moved to Colorado in 2005 to continue her culinary ventures. One of her most notable projects was Tutti, a restaurant in downtown Lafayette. Aside from pioneering the three-plate concept, it had an upstairs dining room for adults and a downstairs playroom for children. the playroom was walled off behind 400 square feet of plexiglass and contained a television, video games, dress up clothes, stuffed animals, and other activities. The idea of the restaurant came from Ruel trying to have a concept that accommodated everyone.

In 2012, after the sale of all of her restaurant ventures, she opened Follow the Ruel, a private chef, consulting and food/wine education company. In 2014 she authored Passions of a Restaurateur, which detailed her life in the culinary industry as well as her family's, namely her father and uncle, careers in food and film which includes producing movies and vaudeville. The same year, she appeared on Food Network's Guy's Grocery Games.

== See also ==
- Culinary Heritage of Switzerland
- Dundee Hills AVA
- List of Italian Americans
