= Aaron May =

American rapper (born 2001)

- Born: May 2, 2001 (age 25); Houston, Texas, U.S.
- Genre: Southern hip hop
- Years active: 2018–present
- Website: aaronmaymusic.com

Aaron May (born May 2, 2001) is an American rapper and record producer. He is best known for his hip-hop song "Let Go".

== Early life ==
May was born in Houston, Texas, and was raised in the suburb of Alief. He began writing poetry in the fifth grade and developed them into songs.

== Music career ==
His debut single "KEEP UP" was released on June 26, 2018. His second single "Let Go" was released on January 29, 2019, along with the debut album CHASE one month later. As of October 2026, "Let Go" has attained over 50 million views on YouTube.

May signed to the record label MOVEINTHEAM / EMPIRE.
