= Duskie Estes =

American chef and restauranteur

- Born: Duskie Lynn Estes; August 4, 1968 (age 57); San Diego, California, United States
- Education: Brown University; California Culinary Academy
- Spouse: John Stewart (m. 2000)
- Children: 2
- Culinary career
- Current restaurants: The Black Piglet; Black Pig Meat Co.
- Previous restaurants: Bovolo (closed); Zazu Kitchen + Farm (closed)

Duskie Lynn Estes (born August 4, 1968) is an American chef and restaurateur.

== Early life and education ==
Estes is the youngest child born to a scientist father and to Carroll L. Estes, a sociology professor. She studied pre-med and law at Brown University prior to becoming a chef. Estes then briefly attended California Culinary Academy before graduating from Brown University.

== Career ==
In 2020–2024, Estes served as the executive chef at the nonprofit, Farm to Pantry in Healdsburg, California.

== Television career ==
In October 2010, Estes was selected to compete in the third season of the Food Network series The Next Iron Chef; she was eliminated at the end of the fourth episode. She returned to the series during the fifth season, where she was eliminated after the second episode.

Estes also infrequently serves as a judge on Guy's Grocery Games.

== Personal life ==
Estes was a vegetarian for 22 years before meeting her husband, fellow chef and salumist John Stewart. Together they own and operate the restaurants Zazu Kitchen + Farm, Bovolo, The Black Piglet and Black Pig Meat Co.

Estes and Stewart have two daughters, Brydie (born 2001) and Mackenzie (born 2002), who inspired the name for their farm, MacBryde Farm.
