= Supermarket Stakeout =

American food reality television series

- Genre: Food reality television
- Presented by: Alex Guarnaschelli
- Judges: Various chefs and other guests
- Country of origin: United States
- Original language: English
- No. of seasons: 7
- No. of episodes: 62

Production
- Running time: 41:00
- Production company: Levity Live

Original release
- Network: Food Network
- Release: August 13, 2019 – August 5, 2025

Supermarket Stakeout is an American cooking reality competition television series that airs on Food Network. It is presented by Iron Chef Alex Guarnaschelli.

Each episode begins with four chefs who have to create dishes from groceries they purchase from customers at a nearby supermarket with a budget of $500 each; the winning chef is awarded a year's worth of groceries.

Supermarket Stakeout premiered on August 13, 2019, and began airing its seventh season in July 2025.

== Format ==
Chefs compete in a pop-up kitchen space in a grocery store parking lot. Over the course of three rounds, they must purchase ingredients from customers leaving the store, with different restrictions in each round. Additional staple ingredients are made available for chefs' use.

Each round lasts 45 minutes, including ingredient purchases, then preparing and plating three servings (one for each member of a two-judge panel and a "beauty plate"). After each round, the chef with the least satisfactory dish is eliminated and must forfeit their remaining money.

In the first round, chefs must buy groceries sight unseen, but may purchase from as many customers as they wish. In the second round, chefs may only buy one customer's groceries, but may look in the bags before making an offer. In the final round, chefs may only buy five items, but may buy from multiple customers and inspect their bags. During the final minutes, they may enter the market and purchase one additional item of their choice, if they have the money and time to do so. The last remaining chef wins the day's grand prize – enough cash to bring their total up to $10,000 in early seasons, a year's worth of free groceries in later ones.

Occasionally, judges instead participate in the competition, including a season 6 "Judges' Takeover" tournament.

== Episodes ==
=== Season 1 (2019) ===
No.	Title	Themes			Original air date	Store (location)	Judges	Contestant	Result
No.	Title	Round 1	Round 2	Round 3	Original air date	Store (location)	Judges	Contestant	Result
1	"An Egg-Cellent Adventure" (Note: "An Egg-Cellent Adventure" was produced as the third episode of the first season, but it aired as the first episode of the season.)	Breakfast sandwiches	Southern favorites	Decadent desserts	August 13, 2019	Lazy Acres (Hermosa Beach, CA)	Duff Goldman; Christian Petroni	Molly Brandt	WINNER
1	"An Egg-Cellent Adventure"	Breakfast sandwiches	Southern favorites	Decadent desserts	August 13, 2019	Lazy Acres (Hermosa Beach, CA)	Duff Goldman; Christian Petroni	Maudie Schmitt	RUNNER-UP
1	"An Egg-Cellent Adventure"	Breakfast sandwiches	Southern favorites	Decadent desserts	August 13, 2019	Lazy Acres (Hermosa Beach, CA)	Duff Goldman; Christian Petroni	Matt Olley	3rd place
1	"An Egg-Cellent Adventure"	Breakfast sandwiches	Southern favorites	Decadent desserts	August 13, 2019	Lazy Acres (Hermosa Beach, CA)	Duff Goldman; Christian Petroni	Nick Jones	4th place
2	"Date Night Fry Day" (Note: "Date Night Fry Day" was produced as the pilot episode, but it aired as the second episode of the first season.)	Chinese takeout	Fried foods	Date night	August 20, 2019	Gelson's (Thousand Oaks, CA)	Bricia Lopez; Eddie Jackson	Judy Cage	WINNER
2	"Date Night Fry Day"	Chinese takeout	Fried foods	Date night	August 20, 2019	Gelson's (Thousand Oaks, CA)	Bricia Lopez; Eddie Jackson	Harrison Bader	RUNNER-UP
2	"Date Night Fry Day"	Chinese takeout	Fried foods	Date night	August 20, 2019	Gelson's (Thousand Oaks, CA)	Bricia Lopez; Eddie Jackson	Brandon Williams	3rd place
2	"Date Night Fry Day"	Chinese takeout	Fried foods	Date night	August 20, 2019	Gelson's (Thousand Oaks, CA)	Bricia Lopez; Eddie Jackson	Britt Scholler	4th place
3	"Carnival Eats Feats" (Note: "Carnival Eats Feats" was produced as the fourth episode of the first season, but it aired as the third episode of the season.)	Ultimate burgers	Italian	Carnival treats	August 27, 2019	Lazy Acres (Hermosa Beach, CA)	Aarti Sequeira; Zac Young	Suzyo Changa	WINNER
3	"Carnival Eats Feats"	Ultimate burgers	Italian	Carnival treats	August 27, 2019	Lazy Acres (Hermosa Beach, CA)	Aarti Sequeira; Zac Young	Rocko Payne	RUNNER-UP
3	"Carnival Eats Feats"	Ultimate burgers	Italian	Carnival treats	August 27, 2019	Lazy Acres (Hermosa Beach, CA)	Aarti Sequeira; Zac Young	Ronaldo Linares	3rd place
3	"Carnival Eats Feats"	Ultimate burgers	Italian	Carnival treats	August 27, 2019	Lazy Acres (Hermosa Beach, CA)	Aarti Sequeira; Zac Young	Lance Kramer	4th place
4	"Midnight Snack Attack" (Note: "Midnight Snack Attack" was produced as the second episode of the first season, but it aired as the fourth episode of the second season.)	Taco party	Sunday brunch	Midnight snacks	September 3, 2019	Gelson's (Thousand Oaks, CA)	Antonia Lofaso; Sharone Hakman	Allison Plumer	WINNER
4	"Midnight Snack Attack"	Taco party	Sunday brunch	Midnight snacks	September 3, 2019	Gelson's (Thousand Oaks, CA)	Antonia Lofaso; Sharone Hakman	Gabrielle McBay	RUNNER-UP
4	"Midnight Snack Attack"	Taco party	Sunday brunch	Midnight snacks	September 3, 2019	Gelson's (Thousand Oaks, CA)	Antonia Lofaso; Sharone Hakman	Robbie Mezanava	3rd place
4	"Midnight Snack Attack"	Taco party	Sunday brunch	Midnight snacks	September 3, 2019	Gelson's (Thousand Oaks, CA)	Antonia Lofaso; Sharone Hakman	Leo Cervantes	4th place
5	"Stake Out Your Surf and Turf" (Note: "Stake Out Your Surf and Turf" was produced as the sixth episode of the first season and "You Wanna Pizza Me?" was produced as the fifth episode of the season, but the episodes aired in reverse order.)	Surf and turf	Diner classics	Summer desserts	September 10, 2019	Bristol Farms (Woodland Hills, CA)	Katie Lee; Sabin Lomac	Luigi Fineo	WINNER
5	"Stake Out Your Surf and Turf"	Surf and turf	Diner classics	Summer desserts	September 10, 2019	Bristol Farms (Woodland Hills, CA)	Katie Lee; Sabin Lomac	Rachel Mitchell	RUNNER-UP
5	"Stake Out Your Surf and Turf"	Surf and turf	Diner classics	Summer desserts	September 10, 2019	Bristol Farms (Woodland Hills, CA)	Katie Lee; Sabin Lomac	Justin Sinclair	3rd place
5	"Stake Out Your Surf and Turf"	Surf and turf	Diner classics	Summer desserts	September 10, 2019	Bristol Farms (Woodland Hills, CA)	Katie Lee; Sabin Lomac	Susie Fortman	4th place
6	"You Wanna Pizza Me?"	Pizza party	Backyard cookout	Wraps	September 10, 2019	Bristol Farms (Woodland Hills, CA)	Monti Carlo; Simon Majumdar	Chris Walker	WINNER
6	"You Wanna Pizza Me?"	Pizza party	Backyard cookout	Wraps	September 10, 2019	Bristol Farms (Woodland Hills, CA)	Monti Carlo; Simon Majumdar	Rosie O'Connor	RUNNER-UP
6	"You Wanna Pizza Me?"	Pizza party	Backyard cookout	Wraps	September 10, 2019	Bristol Farms (Woodland Hills, CA)	Monti Carlo; Simon Majumdar	Bella Jones	3rd place
6	"You Wanna Pizza Me?"	Pizza party	Backyard cookout	Wraps	September 10, 2019	Bristol Farms (Woodland Hills, CA)	Monti Carlo; Simon Majumdar	Douglas Walls	4th place

=== Season 2 (2020) ===
No.	Title	Themes			Original air date	Store (location)	Judges	Contestant	Result
No.	Title	Round 1	Round 2	Round 3	Original air date	Store (location)	Judges	Contestant	Result
1	"Some Like It Spicy" (Note: "Some Like It Spicy" was produced as the fifth episode of the second season, but it aired as the first episode of the season.)	Breakfast-to-Go	Spicy	Guilty pleasures	March 17, 2020	Fry's Supermarket (Phoenix, AZ)	Jeff Mauro; Molly Yeh	Logan Sandoval	WINNER
1	"Some Like It Spicy"	Breakfast-to-Go	Spicy	Guilty pleasures	March 17, 2020	Fry's Supermarket (Phoenix, AZ)	Jeff Mauro; Molly Yeh	Beeta Mohajeri	RUNNER-UP
1	"Some Like It Spicy"	Breakfast-to-Go	Spicy	Guilty pleasures	March 17, 2020	Fry's Supermarket (Phoenix, AZ)	Jeff Mauro; Molly Yeh	Will Brown	3rd place
1	"Some Like It Spicy"	Breakfast-to-Go	Spicy	Guilty pleasures	March 17, 2020	Fry's Supermarket (Phoenix, AZ)	Jeff Mauro; Molly Yeh	Sonia El-Nawal	4th place
2	"Sweet Gamble"	Nacho platter	Retro Goes Modern	Sweet and salty	March 24, 2020	Smith's Marketplace (Las Vegas, NV)	Antonia Lofaso; Jeremy McBride	Brandon Rouge	WINNER
2	"Sweet Gamble"	Nacho platter	Retro Goes Modern	Sweet and salty	March 24, 2020	Smith's Marketplace (Las Vegas, NV)	Antonia Lofaso; Jeremy McBride	Dean Hiatt	RUNNER-UP
2	"Sweet Gamble"	Nacho platter	Retro Goes Modern	Sweet and salty	March 24, 2020	Smith's Marketplace (Las Vegas, NV)	Antonia Lofaso; Jeremy McBride	Niya "Jack" Williams	3rd place
2	"Sweet Gamble"	Nacho platter	Retro Goes Modern	Sweet and salty	March 24, 2020	Smith's Marketplace (Las Vegas, NV)	Antonia Lofaso; Jeremy McBride	ML Carroll	4th place
3	"Sixty-Dollar Butter"	Sandwiches	Take Me to Italy	Indulgent desserts	March 31, 2020	Smith's Marketplace (Las Vegas, NV)	Antonia Lofaso; Roger Mooking	Nichole Armstead	WINNER
3	"Sixty-Dollar Butter"	Sandwiches	Take Me to Italy	Indulgent desserts	March 31, 2020	Smith's Marketplace (Las Vegas, NV)	Antonia Lofaso; Roger Mooking	Raphael Gamon	RUNNER-UP
3	"Sixty-Dollar Butter"	Sandwiches	Take Me to Italy	Indulgent desserts	March 31, 2020	Smith's Marketplace (Las Vegas, NV)	Antonia Lofaso; Roger Mooking	Andrew Garrett	3rd place
3	"Sixty-Dollar Butter"	Sandwiches	Take Me to Italy	Indulgent desserts	March 31, 2020	Smith's Marketplace (Las Vegas, NV)	Antonia Lofaso; Roger Mooking	Tonia Gaskins	4th place
4	"Parking Lot Picnic" (Note: "Parking Lot Picnic" was produced as the first episode of the second season, but it aired as the fourth episode of the season.)	Sweet breakfast	Family picnic	Bring the Heat	April 7, 2020	Smith's Marketplace (Las Vegas, NV)	Sabin Lomac; Aarti Sequeira	Darrell Alleyne	WINNER
4	"Parking Lot Picnic"	Sweet breakfast	Family picnic	Bring the Heat	April 7, 2020	Smith's Marketplace (Las Vegas, NV)	Sabin Lomac; Aarti Sequeira	Lulu Chustz	RUNNER-UP
4	"Parking Lot Picnic"	Sweet breakfast	Family picnic	Bring the Heat	April 7, 2020	Smith's Marketplace (Las Vegas, NV)	Sabin Lomac; Aarti Sequeira	Millie Fernandez	3rd place
4	"Parking Lot Picnic"	Sweet breakfast	Family picnic	Bring the Heat	April 7, 2020	Smith's Marketplace (Las Vegas, NV)	Sabin Lomac; Aarti Sequeira	Beni Velazquez	4th place
5	"Luck Be a Shopper" (Note: "Luck Be a Shopper" was produced as the fourth episode of the second season, but it aired as the fifth episode of the season.)	Tailgate	Candlelit dinner	Fruit dessert	April 14, 2020	Smith's Marketplace (Las Vegas, NV)	Sharone Hakman; Roger Mooking	Shehu Fitzgerald	WINNER
5	"Luck Be a Shopper"	Tailgate	Candlelit dinner	Fruit dessert	April 14, 2020	Smith's Marketplace (Las Vegas, NV)	Sharone Hakman; Roger Mooking	Amanda Morris	RUNNER-UP
5	"Luck Be a Shopper"	Tailgate	Candlelit dinner	Fruit dessert	April 14, 2020	Smith's Marketplace (Las Vegas, NV)	Sharone Hakman; Roger Mooking	Mat Schuster	3rd place
5	"Luck Be a Shopper"	Tailgate	Candlelit dinner	Fruit dessert	April 14, 2020	Smith's Marketplace (Las Vegas, NV)	Sharone Hakman; Roger Mooking	Chelsea Smith	4th place
6	"Toast the Competition" (Note: "Toast the Competition" was produced as the tenth episode of the second season, but it aired as the sixth episode of the season.)	Burrito	Grandma's Best	Toast	April 21, 2020	Ralphs (Glendale, CA)	Christian Petroni; Courtney Rada	Andrea LeTard	WINNER
6	"Toast the Competition"	Burrito	Grandma's Best	Toast	April 21, 2020	Ralphs (Glendale, CA)	Christian Petroni; Courtney Rada	Otto Borsich	RUNNER-UP
6	"Toast the Competition"	Burrito	Grandma's Best	Toast	April 21, 2020	Ralphs (Glendale, CA)	Christian Petroni; Courtney Rada	Robert "Stew" Stewart	3rd place
6	"Toast the Competition"	Burrito	Grandma's Best	Toast	April 21, 2020	Ralphs (Glendale, CA)	Christian Petroni; Courtney Rada	Anessa Sanchez	4th place
7	"Lay'er On Me" (Note: "Lay'er On Me" was produced as the sixth episode of the second season, but it aired as the seventh episode of the season.)	Noodles	Ballpark bite	Layered dessert	April 28, 2020	Fry's Supermarket (Phoenix, AZ)	Bobby Flay; Brooke Williamson	Steven Moore	WINNER
7	"Lay'er On Me"	Noodles	Ballpark bite	Layered dessert	April 28, 2020	Fry's Supermarket (Phoenix, AZ)	Bobby Flay; Brooke Williamson	Vita Jarrin	RUNNER-UP
7	"Lay'er On Me"	Noodles	Ballpark bite	Layered dessert	April 28, 2020	Fry's Supermarket (Phoenix, AZ)	Bobby Flay; Brooke Williamson	Alison Phillips	3rd place
7	"Lay'er On Me"	Noodles	Ballpark bite	Layered dessert	April 28, 2020	Fry's Supermarket (Phoenix, AZ)	Bobby Flay; Brooke Williamson	Greg Akahoshi	4th place
8	"Fishing for a Win" (Note: "Fishing for a Win" was produced as the seventh episode of the second season, but it aired as the eighth episode of the season.)	From the Sea	Cheat Day Dish	On a Stick	May 5, 2020	Bashas' (Phoenix, AZ)	Eddie Jackson; Scott Conant	Nancy Manlove	WINNER
8	"Fishing for a Win"	From the Sea	Cheat Day Dish	On a Stick	May 5, 2020	Bashas' (Phoenix, AZ)	Eddie Jackson; Scott Conant	Cal Smith	RUNNER-UP
8	"Fishing for a Win"	From the Sea	Cheat Day Dish	On a Stick	May 5, 2020	Bashas' (Phoenix, AZ)	Eddie Jackson; Scott Conant	Natalie Lewis	3rd place
8	"Fishing for a Win"	From the Sea	Cheat Day Dish	On a Stick	May 5, 2020	Bashas' (Phoenix, AZ)	Eddie Jackson; Scott Conant	Eric Acton	4th place
9	"Meet Your Mash" (Note: "Meet Your Mash" was produced as the eighth episode of the second season, but it aired as the ninth episode of the season.)	Make It Mediterranean	Classic Mash-Ups	Sweet and Saucy	May 12, 2020	Bashas' (Gilbert, AZ)	Eddie Jackson; Aarti Sequeira	Lauren Van Liew	WINNER
9	"Meet Your Mash"	Make It Mediterranean	Classic Mash-Ups	Sweet and Saucy	May 12, 2020	Bashas' (Gilbert, AZ)	Eddie Jackson; Aarti Sequeira	Mike Newton	RUNNER-UP
9	"Meet Your Mash"	Make It Mediterranean	Classic Mash-Ups	Sweet and Saucy	May 12, 2020	Bashas' (Gilbert, AZ)	Eddie Jackson; Aarti Sequeira	Charleen Caabay	3rd place
9	"Meet Your Mash"	Make It Mediterranean	Classic Mash-Ups	Sweet and Saucy	May 12, 2020	Bashas' (Gilbert, AZ)	Eddie Jackson; Aarti Sequeira	Tony Bar	4th place
10	"Meat Me in the Parking Lot" (Note: "Meat Me in the Parking Lot" was produced as the ninth episode of the second season, but it aired as the tenth episode of the season.)	Meat and potatoes	Spin the Globe	Stuff It	May 19, 2020	Ralphs (Glendale, CA)	Sabin Lomac; Maneet Chauhan	Crystal "Pink" DeLongpré	WINNER
10	"Meat Me in the Parking Lot"	Meat and potatoes	Spin the Globe	Stuff It	May 19, 2020	Ralphs (Glendale, CA)	Sabin Lomac; Maneet Chauhan	Johnny Wang	RUNNER-UP
10	"Meat Me in the Parking Lot"	Meat and potatoes	Spin the Globe	Stuff It	May 19, 2020	Ralphs (Glendale, CA)	Sabin Lomac; Maneet Chauhan	Danielle Duran-Zecca	3rd place
10	"Meat Me in the Parking Lot"	Meat and potatoes	Spin the Globe	Stuff It	May 19, 2020	Ralphs (Glendale, CA)	Sabin Lomac; Maneet Chauhan	Cash Murphy	4th place
11	"Trouble in Triple Decker"	Barbecue	Triple Decker	Cinnamon and sugar	May 26, 2020	Ralphs (Glendale, CA)	Christian Petroni; Aarti Sequeira	Lauren Lawless	WINNER
11	"Trouble in Triple Decker"	Barbecue	Triple Decker	Cinnamon and sugar	May 26, 2020	Ralphs (Glendale, CA)	Christian Petroni; Aarti Sequeira	Luke Rogers	RUNNER-UP
11	"Trouble in Triple Decker"	Barbecue	Triple Decker	Cinnamon and sugar	May 26, 2020	Ralphs (Glendale, CA)	Christian Petroni; Aarti Sequeira	Leah Eveleigh	3rd place
11	"Trouble in Triple Decker"	Barbecue	Triple Decker	Cinnamon and sugar	May 26, 2020	Ralphs (Glendale, CA)	Christian Petroni; Aarti Sequeira	Bob Anthony	4th place
12	"Burger Night Bonanza"	Burger Night	Going Down South	Midnight snack	June 2, 2020	Bristol Farms (Woodland Hills, CA)	Giada De Laurentiis; Zac Young	Alisa Golenko	WINNER
12	"Burger Night Bonanza"	Burger Night	Going Down South	Midnight snack	June 2, 2020	Bristol Farms (Woodland Hills, CA)	Giada De Laurentiis; Zac Young	Leilani Baugh	RUNNER-UP
12	"Burger Night Bonanza"	Burger Night	Going Down South	Midnight snack	June 2, 2020	Bristol Farms (Woodland Hills, CA)	Giada De Laurentiis; Zac Young	Scott Clarke	3rd place
12	"Burger Night Bonanza"	Burger Night	Going Down South	Midnight snack	June 2, 2020	Bristol Farms (Woodland Hills, CA)	Giada De Laurentiis; Zac Young	Clark Frain	4th place
13	"Market Meltdown"	Asian fusion	Something Crunchy	Melt	June 16, 2020	Bristol Farms (Woodland Hills, CA)	Jet Tila; Molly Brandt	Gail Huesmann	WINNER
13	"Market Meltdown"	Asian fusion	Something Crunchy	Melt	June 16, 2020	Bristol Farms (Woodland Hills, CA)	Jet Tila; Molly Brandt	Lisa Kiorkis	RUNNER-UP
13	"Market Meltdown"	Asian fusion	Something Crunchy	Melt	June 16, 2020	Bristol Farms (Woodland Hills, CA)	Jet Tila; Molly Brandt	Mike Williams	3rd place
13	"Market Meltdown"	Asian fusion	Something Crunchy	Melt	June 16, 2020	Bristol Farms (Woodland Hills, CA)	Jet Tila; Molly Brandt	Roberto Cammarota	4th place
14	"What Would Alex Make?: Takeout Troubles"				June 23, 2020				

=== Season 3 (2020–21) ===
No.	Title	Themes			Original air date	Store (location)	Judges	Contestant	Result
No.	Title	Round 1	Round 2	Round 3	Original air date	Store (location)	Judges	Contestant	Result
1	"Viva la Stakeout"	Sky High Sandwiches	Bon Appetit	Something Cheesy	December 29, 2020	Fields Market (Canoga Park, CA)	Eddie Jackson; Stephanie Boswell	Allison Fasano	WINNER
1	"Viva la Stakeout"	Sky High Sandwiches	Bon Appetit	Something Cheesy	December 29, 2020	Fields Market (Canoga Park, CA)	Eddie Jackson; Stephanie Boswell	Jay Powell	RUNNER-UP
1	"Viva la Stakeout"	Sky High Sandwiches	Bon Appetit	Something Cheesy	December 29, 2020	Fields Market (Canoga Park, CA)	Eddie Jackson; Stephanie Boswell	Jamal Bland	3rd place
1	"Viva la Stakeout"	Sky High Sandwiches	Bon Appetit	Something Cheesy	December 29, 2020	Fields Market (Canoga Park, CA)	Eddie Jackson; Stephanie Boswell	Gabrielle Reyes	4th place
2	"Carnivores Unite"	Meat Lovers	Bento Box	Something Nutty	January 5, 2021	Fields Market (Canoga Park, CA)	Jet Tila; Antonia Lofaso	Harold Sims	WINNER
2	"Carnivores Unite"	Meat Lovers	Bento Box	Something Nutty	January 5, 2021	Fields Market (Canoga Park, CA)	Jet Tila; Antonia Lofaso	Samantha Mui	RUNNER-UP
2	"Carnivores Unite"	Meat Lovers	Bento Box	Something Nutty	January 5, 2021	Fields Market (Canoga Park, CA)	Jet Tila; Antonia Lofaso	Phillipe Sobon	3rd place
2	"Carnivores Unite"	Meat Lovers	Bento Box	Something Nutty	January 5, 2021	Fields Market (Canoga Park, CA)	Jet Tila; Antonia Lofaso	Jamie Gilmore	4th place
3	"Cash Strapped"	Caribbean	Handheld Dish	Cookie Crust	January 12, 2021	Fields Market (Canoga Park, CA)	Christian Petroni; Eddie Jackson	Kris Wallenta	WINNER
3	"Cash Strapped"	Caribbean	Handheld Dish	Cookie Crust	January 12, 2021	Fields Market (Canoga Park, CA)	Christian Petroni; Eddie Jackson	Michael Gerbino	RUNNER-UP
3	"Cash Strapped"	Caribbean	Handheld Dish	Cookie Crust	January 12, 2021	Fields Market (Canoga Park, CA)	Christian Petroni; Eddie Jackson	Venoy Rogers	3rd place
3	"Cash Strapped"	Caribbean	Handheld Dish	Cookie Crust	January 12, 2021	Fields Market (Canoga Park, CA)	Christian Petroni; Eddie Jackson	Bri Van Scotter	4th place
4	"Greek, Sweet Open-Faced Eats"	All Greek To Me	Fruity Dessert	Open-Faced	January 19, 2021	Fields Market (Canoga Park, CA)	Sabin Lomac; Aarti Sequeira	Jenn Fillenworth	WINNER
4	"Greek, Sweet Open-Faced Eats"	All Greek To Me	Fruity Dessert	Open-Faced	January 19, 2021	Fields Market (Canoga Park, CA)	Sabin Lomac; Aarti Sequeira	Julie Liebhoff	RUNNER-UP
4	"Greek, Sweet Open-Faced Eats"	All Greek To Me	Fruity Dessert	Open-Faced	January 19, 2021	Fields Market (Canoga Park, CA)	Sabin Lomac; Aarti Sequeira	Brandon Williams	3rd place
4	"Greek, Sweet Open-Faced Eats"	All Greek To Me	Fruity Dessert	Open-Faced	January 19, 2021	Fields Market (Canoga Park, CA)	Sabin Lomac; Aarti Sequeira	Daniel Roy	4th place
5	"Parking Lot Party"	Party Snacks	Hearty Breakfast	Decadent Desserts	January 26, 2021	Fields Market (Canoga Park, CA)	Antonia Lofaso; Eddie Jackson	Abel Veulens	WINNER
5	"Parking Lot Party"	Party Snacks	Hearty Breakfast	Decadent Desserts	January 26, 2021	Fields Market (Canoga Park, CA)	Antonia Lofaso; Eddie Jackson	Mel Martin	RUNNER-UP
5	"Parking Lot Party"	Party Snacks	Hearty Breakfast	Decadent Desserts	January 26, 2021	Fields Market (Canoga Park, CA)	Antonia Lofaso; Eddie Jackson	Lex Grant	3rd place
5	"Parking Lot Party"	Party Snacks	Hearty Breakfast	Decadent Desserts	January 26, 2021	Fields Market (Canoga Park, CA)	Antonia Lofaso; Eddie Jackson	Shane Mcintosh	4th place
6	"Who's Hot, Who's Cold"	Super Spicy	Family Picnic	Ice Cream Truck	February 2, 2021	Fields Market (Canoga Park, CA)	Jeremy McBryde; Brooke Williamson	Ayo Cherry	WINNER
6	"Who's Hot, Who's Cold"	Super Spicy	Family Picnic	Ice Cream Truck	February 2, 2021	Fields Market (Canoga Park, CA)	Jeremy McBryde; Brooke Williamson	Danny Bullock	RUNNER-UP
6	"Who's Hot, Who's Cold"	Super Spicy	Family Picnic	Ice Cream Truck	February 2, 2021	Fields Market (Canoga Park, CA)	Jeremy McBryde; Brooke Williamson	Sayvepen Sengsavang	3rd place
6	"Who's Hot, Who's Cold"	Super Spicy	Family Picnic	Ice Cream Truck	February 2, 2021	Fields Market (Canoga Park, CA)	Jeremy McBryde; Brooke Williamson	Tony Biggs	4th place
7	"Fun on a Bun"	Pasta Night	Fast Food	Hot and Cold Desserts	February 9, 2021	Fields Market (Canoga Park, CA)	Eddie Jackson; Stephanie Boswell	Dave Hadley	WINNER
7	"Fun on a Bun"	Pasta Night	Fast Food	Hot and Cold Desserts	February 9, 2021	Fields Market (Canoga Park, CA)	Eddie Jackson; Stephanie Boswell	Thierry Babet	RUNNER-UP
7	"Fun on a Bun"	Pasta Night	Fast Food	Hot and Cold Desserts	February 9, 2021	Fields Market (Canoga Park, CA)	Eddie Jackson; Stephanie Boswell	Brianna Sebasto	3rd place
7	"Fun on a Bun"	Pasta Night	Fast Food	Hot and Cold Desserts	February 9, 2021	Fields Market (Canoga Park, CA)	Eddie Jackson; Stephanie Boswell	Mila Furman	4th place
8	"Going For Broke"				February 16, 2021				WINNER
8	"Going For Broke"				February 16, 2021				RUNNER-UP
8	"Going For Broke"				February 16, 2021				3rd place
8	"Going For Broke"				February 16, 2021				4th place
9	"Cheers!"				February 23, 2021				WINNER
9	"Cheers!"				February 23, 2021				RUNNER-UP
9	"Cheers!"				February 23, 2021				3rd place
9	"Cheers!"				February 23, 2021				4th place

=== Season 4 (2022) ===
No.	Title	Themes			Original air date	Store (location)	Judges	Contestant	Result
No.	Title	Round 1	Round 2	Round 3	Original air date	Store (location)	Judges	Contestant	Result
1	"You Got Fries in That?	With a Side of Fries	Fruit Forward	Bittersweet	May 17, 2022	Bashas (Scottsdale, AZ)	Stephanie Boswell Jet Tila	Won Kim	WINNER
1	"You Got Fries in That?	With a Side of Fries	Fruit Forward	Bittersweet	May 17, 2022	Bashas (Scottsdale, AZ)	Stephanie Boswell Jet Tila	David Welch	RUNNER-UP
1	"You Got Fries in That?	With a Side of Fries	Fruit Forward	Bittersweet	May 17, 2022	Bashas (Scottsdale, AZ)	Stephanie Boswell Jet Tila	Vanessa Lauren	3rd place
1	"You Got Fries in That?	With a Side of Fries	Fruit Forward	Bittersweet	May 17, 2022	Bashas (Scottsdale, AZ)	Stephanie Boswell Jet Tila	Tova Sterling	4th place
2	"Buffet or Bust"	Breakfast Buffet	Turf and Turf	With a Cherry on Top	May 24, 2022	Bashas (Gilbert, AZ)	Ignacio "Nacho" Aguirre Antonia Lofaso	Darian Bryan	WINNER
2	"Buffet or Bust"	Breakfast Buffet	Turf and Turf	With a Cherry on Top	May 24, 2022	Bashas (Gilbert, AZ)	Ignacio "Nacho" Aguirre Antonia Lofaso	Jason Brown	RUNNER-UP
2	"Buffet or Bust"	Breakfast Buffet	Turf and Turf	With a Cherry on Top	May 24, 2022	Bashas (Gilbert, AZ)	Ignacio "Nacho" Aguirre Antonia Lofaso	David Yapo	3rd place
2	"Buffet or Bust"	Breakfast Buffet	Turf and Turf	With a Cherry on Top	May 24, 2022	Bashas (Gilbert, AZ)	Ignacio "Nacho" Aguirre Antonia Lofaso	Lindsay Dix	4th place
3	"Reelin' in the Right Shoppers"	Fresh Catch	Soup for the Soul	Chocoholic	May 31, 2022	Bashas (Scottsdale, AZ)	Stephanie Boswell Jason Smith	Sophia Harris	WINNER
3	"Reelin' in the Right Shoppers"	Fresh Catch	Soup for the Soul	Chocoholic	May 31, 2022	Bashas (Scottsdale, AZ)	Stephanie Boswell Jason Smith	Ekhlas "Koko" Farjado	RUNNER-UP
3	"Reelin' in the Right Shoppers"	Fresh Catch	Soup for the Soul	Chocoholic	May 31, 2022	Bashas (Scottsdale, AZ)	Stephanie Boswell Jason Smith	Jason Morse	3rd place
3	"Reelin' in the Right Shoppers"	Fresh Catch	Soup for the Soul	Chocoholic	May 31, 2022	Bashas (Scottsdale, AZ)	Stephanie Boswell Jason Smith	Tiffany Williams	4th place
4	"Rule the Roost"	Fly the Coop	Pizza Delivery	Diner Dessert	June 7, 2022	Bashas (Scottsdale, AZ)	Eddie Jackson Millie Peartree	Natalie Blake	WINNER
4	"Rule the Roost"	Fly the Coop	Pizza Delivery	Diner Dessert	June 7, 2022	Bashas (Scottsdale, AZ)	Eddie Jackson Millie Peartree	Jon Kim	RUNNER-UP
4	"Rule the Roost"	Fly the Coop	Pizza Delivery	Diner Dessert	June 7, 2022	Bashas (Scottsdale, AZ)	Eddie Jackson Millie Peartree	Brie Hodges	3rd place
4	"Rule the Roost"	Fly the Coop	Pizza Delivery	Diner Dessert	June 7, 2022	Bashas (Scottsdale, AZ)	Eddie Jackson Millie Peartree	Angelo Landi	4th place
5	"Stew or Get Off the Lot"	The Perfect Panini	Stew It	Crusted	June 14, 2022	Bashas (Scottsdale, AZ)	Jeremy McBryde Christian Petroni	Chloe Gould	WINNER
5	"Stew or Get Off the Lot"	The Perfect Panini	Stew It	Crusted	June 14, 2022	Bashas (Scottsdale, AZ)	Jeremy McBryde Christian Petroni	German Rizzo	RUNNER-UP
5	"Stew or Get Off the Lot"	The Perfect Panini	Stew It	Crusted	June 14, 2022	Bashas (Scottsdale, AZ)	Jeremy McBryde Christian Petroni	Toni Sapienza	3rd place
5	"Stew or Get Off the Lot"	The Perfect Panini	Stew It	Crusted	June 14, 2022	Bashas (Scottsdale, AZ)	Jeremy McBryde Christian Petroni	Kevin Johnson	4th place
6	"Blue Plate Blues"	South of the Border	Blue Plate Special	Sweet Treat	June 21, 2022	Bashas (Scottsdale, AZ)	Kalen Allen Maneet Chauhan	Leon Gomez	WINNER
6	"Blue Plate Blues"	South of the Border	Blue Plate Special	Sweet Treat	June 21, 2022	Bashas (Scottsdale, AZ)	Kalen Allen Maneet Chauhan	Rayshun Parkman	RUNNER-UP
6	"Blue Plate Blues"	South of the Border	Blue Plate Special	Sweet Treat	June 21, 2022	Bashas (Scottsdale, AZ)	Kalen Allen Maneet Chauhan	Nina Sagoo	3rd place
6	"Blue Plate Blues"	South of the Border	Blue Plate Special	Sweet Treat	June 21, 2022	Bashas (Scottsdale, AZ)	Kalen Allen Maneet Chauhan	Kevin McMullen	4th place
7	"Vacation Nation"	Beach Vacation	From the Midwest	Glamping Dessert	June 28, 2022	Bashas (Scottsdale, AZ)	Eddie Jackson Christian Petroni	Megan Gregory	WINNER
7	"Vacation Nation"	Beach Vacation	From the Midwest	Glamping Dessert	June 28, 2022	Bashas (Scottsdale, AZ)	Eddie Jackson Christian Petroni	Pat Marone	RUNNER-UP
7	"Vacation Nation"	Beach Vacation	From the Midwest	Glamping Dessert	June 28, 2022	Bashas (Scottsdale, AZ)	Eddie Jackson Christian Petroni	Kyle Hires	3rd place
7	"Vacation Nation"	Beach Vacation	From the Midwest	Glamping Dessert	June 28, 2022	Bashas (Scottsdale, AZ)	Eddie Jackson Christian Petroni	Corbin Schiedermayer	4th place
8	"Parking at the Beach"	Boardwalk Bite	California Coast	Beach Bonfire Dessert	July 5, 2022	Bashas (Scottsdale, AZ)	Kalen Allen Zac Young	Igor Krichmar	WINNER
8	"Parking at the Beach"	Boardwalk Bite	California Coast	Beach Bonfire Dessert	July 5, 2022	Bashas (Scottsdale, AZ)	Kalen Allen Zac Young	Sierra Davis	RUNNER-UP
8	"Parking at the Beach"	Boardwalk Bite	California Coast	Beach Bonfire Dessert	July 5, 2022	Bashas (Scottsdale, AZ)	Kalen Allen Zac Young	Jason Triail	3rd place
8	"Parking at the Beach"	Boardwalk Bite	California Coast	Beach Bonfire Dessert	July 5, 2022	Bashas (Scottsdale, AZ)	Kalen Allen Zac Young	Evan Martin	4th place
9	"Fry of the Tiger"	Fried Sandwich	Tomato Sauce Something	Opposites Attract	July 12, 2022	Bashas (Scottsdale, AZ)	Eddie Jackson Millie Peartree	Trevor Ross	WINNER
9	"Fry of the Tiger"	Fried Sandwich	Tomato Sauce Something	Opposites Attract	July 12, 2022	Bashas (Scottsdale, AZ)	Eddie Jackson Millie Peartree	Christine Wendland	RUNNER-UP
9	"Fry of the Tiger"	Fried Sandwich	Tomato Sauce Something	Opposites Attract	July 12, 2022	Bashas (Scottsdale, AZ)	Eddie Jackson Millie Peartree	George Giotsas	3rd place
9	"Fry of the Tiger"	Fried Sandwich	Tomato Sauce Something	Opposites Attract	July 12, 2022	Bashas (Scottsdale, AZ)	Eddie Jackson Millie Peartree	Whitney Miller	4th place
10	"Chili Con Carte"	Chili Cook Off	Breakfast for Dinner	The Perfect Bite	July 19, 2022	Bashas (Scottsdale, AZ)	Eric Adjepong Aarti Sequeira	Matthew Moore	WINNER
10	"Chili Con Carte"	Chili Cook Off	Breakfast for Dinner	The Perfect Bite	July 19, 2022	Bashas (Scottsdale, AZ)	Eric Adjepong Aarti Sequeira	Carlos Mulia	RUNNER-UP
10	"Chili Con Carte"	Chili Cook Off	Breakfast for Dinner	The Perfect Bite	July 19, 2022	Bashas (Scottsdale, AZ)	Eric Adjepong Aarti Sequeira	Toni Elkhouri	3rd place
10	"Chili Con Carte"	Chili Cook Off	Breakfast for Dinner	The Perfect Bite	July 19, 2022	Bashas (Scottsdale, AZ)	Eric Adjepong Aarti Sequeira	Laurie Wilkins	4th place
11	"Globetrottin' Trouble"	Coffee Shop Breakfast	Globetrotter	Fill It	July 26, 2022	Bashas (Scottsdale, AZ)	Scott Conant Antonia Lofaso	Nick Hunter	WINNER
11	"Globetrottin' Trouble"	Coffee Shop Breakfast	Globetrotter	Fill It	July 26, 2022	Bashas (Scottsdale, AZ)	Scott Conant Antonia Lofaso	Leslie Rainey	RUNNER-UP
11	"Globetrottin' Trouble"	Coffee Shop Breakfast	Globetrotter	Fill It	July 26, 2022	Bashas (Scottsdale, AZ)	Scott Conant Antonia Lofaso	Lakendra Davis	3rd place
11	"Globetrottin' Trouble"	Coffee Shop Breakfast	Globetrotter	Fill It	July 26, 2022	Bashas (Scottsdale, AZ)	Scott Conant Antonia Lofaso	Dani Dubois	4th place
12	"Steakout"	Stakeout	Chopped	Berry Good	August 2, 2022	Bashas (Gilbert, AZ)	Ali Khan Antonia Lofaso	Courtney Wright	WINNER
12	"Steakout"	Stakeout	Chopped	Berry Good	August 2, 2022	Bashas (Gilbert, AZ)	Ali Khan Antonia Lofaso	Kevin Winston	RUNNER-UP
12	"Steakout"	Stakeout	Chopped	Berry Good	August 2, 2022	Bashas (Gilbert, AZ)	Ali Khan Antonia Lofaso	Suzanne Lossia	3rd place
12	"Steakout"	Stakeout	Chopped	Berry Good	August 2, 2022	Bashas (Gilbert, AZ)	Ali Khan Antonia Lofaso	David Crews	4th place
13	"Grilled to Perfection"	Grilled to Perfection	Make Me Feel Better	Herbaceous	August 9, 2022	Bashas (Scottsdale, AZ)	Maneet Chauhan Scott Conant	Janel Fields	WINNER
13	"Grilled to Perfection"	Grilled to Perfection	Make Me Feel Better	Herbaceous	August 9, 2022	Bashas (Scottsdale, AZ)	Maneet Chauhan Scott Conant	Raul Vasquez	RUNNER-UP
13	"Grilled to Perfection"	Grilled to Perfection	Make Me Feel Better	Herbaceous	August 9, 2022	Bashas (Scottsdale, AZ)	Maneet Chauhan Scott Conant	Lou Supan	3rd place
13	"Grilled to Perfection"	Grilled to Perfection	Make Me Feel Better	Herbaceous	August 9, 2022	Bashas (Scottsdale, AZ)	Maneet Chauhan Scott Conant	Lori McLain	4th place
14	"Homage to the Parking Lot"	Parking Lot Portable	Old Fashioned	Something with Candy	August 16, 2022	Bashas (Scottsdale, AZ)	Kalen Allen Aarti Sequeira	Isamar De La Cruz	WINNER
14	"Homage to the Parking Lot"	Parking Lot Portable	Old Fashioned	Something with Candy	August 16, 2022	Bashas (Scottsdale, AZ)	Kalen Allen Aarti Sequeira	Summer Prescott	RUNNER-UP
14	"Homage to the Parking Lot"	Parking Lot Portable	Old Fashioned	Something with Candy	August 16, 2022	Bashas (Scottsdale, AZ)	Kalen Allen Aarti Sequeira	Katie Chin	3rd place
14	"Homage to the Parking Lot"	Parking Lot Portable	Old Fashioned	Something with Candy	August 16, 2022	Bashas (Scottsdale, AZ)	Kalen Allen Aarti Sequeira	Santana Burriss	4th place
15	"Cash for Carbs"	Taste of the Tropics	Carb Loader	Crunchy and Smooth	August 23, 2022	Bashas (Scottsdale, AZ)	Ahmad Alzahabi Maneet Chauhan	David Wang	WINNER
15	"Cash for Carbs"	Taste of the Tropics	Carb Loader	Crunchy and Smooth	August 23, 2022	Bashas (Scottsdale, AZ)	Ahmad Alzahabi Maneet Chauhan	Adjoa Courtney	RUNNER-UP
15	"Cash for Carbs"	Taste of the Tropics	Carb Loader	Crunchy and Smooth	August 23, 2022	Bashas (Scottsdale, AZ)	Ahmad Alzahabi Maneet Chauhan	Andrea Uzarowski	3rd place
15	"Cash for Carbs"	Taste of the Tropics	Carb Loader	Crunchy and Smooth	August 23, 2022	Bashas (Scottsdale, AZ)	Ahmad Alzahabi Maneet Chauhan	Demetrios Pyliotis	4th place
16	"A Ricey Situation"	Something with Rice	Pub Food	Farmer's Market	August 30, 2022	Bashas (Scottsdale, AZ)	Tanya Fields Antonia Lofaso	Anja Lee Wittels	WINNER
16	"A Ricey Situation"	Something with Rice	Pub Food	Farmer's Market	August 30, 2022	Bashas (Scottsdale, AZ)	Tanya Fields Antonia Lofaso	Matt Alexander	RUNNER-UP
16	"A Ricey Situation"	Something with Rice	Pub Food	Farmer's Market	August 30, 2022	Bashas (Scottsdale, AZ)	Tanya Fields Antonia Lofaso	Elon Bridgett	3rd place
16	"A Ricey Situation"	Something with Rice	Pub Food	Farmer's Market	August 30, 2022	Bashas (Scottsdale, AZ)	Tanya Fields Antonia Lofaso	Jessie Lugo	4th place
17	"Lots of Toppings, Lots of Surprises"	Street Food	Lots of Toppings (Double Elimination)	Le Dessert	September 6, 2022	Bashas (Scottsdale, AZ)	Eric Adjepong Antonia Lofaso	Jeromy Wright	WINNER
17	"Lots of Toppings, Lots of Surprises"	Street Food	Lots of Toppings (Double Elimination)	Le Dessert	September 6, 2022	Bashas (Scottsdale, AZ)	Eric Adjepong Antonia Lofaso	Natasha Clement	RUNNER-UP
17	"Lots of Toppings, Lots of Surprises"	Street Food	Lots of Toppings (Double Elimination)	Le Dessert	September 6, 2022	Bashas (Scottsdale, AZ)	Eric Adjepong Antonia Lofaso	Casey Colaneri	3rd place
17	"Lots of Toppings, Lots of Surprises"	Street Food	Lots of Toppings (Double Elimination)	Le Dessert	September 6, 2022	Bashas (Scottsdale, AZ)	Eric Adjepong Antonia Lofaso	Amber Williams	3rd place
18	"Hearty and Happy"	Hearty Breakfast	Happy Hour	Sugar and Spice	September 13, 2022	Bashas (Scottsdale, AZ)	Stephanie Boswell Tanya Fields	Caylon Allen	WINNER
18	"Hearty and Happy"	Hearty Breakfast	Happy Hour	Sugar and Spice	September 13, 2022	Bashas (Scottsdale, AZ)	Stephanie Boswell Tanya Fields	Joi Fowler	RUNNER-UP
18	"Hearty and Happy"	Hearty Breakfast	Happy Hour	Sugar and Spice	September 13, 2022	Bashas (Scottsdale, AZ)	Stephanie Boswell Tanya Fields	Tony Godbolt	3rd place
18	"Hearty and Happy"	Hearty Breakfast	Happy Hour	Sugar and Spice	September 13, 2022	Bashas (Scottsdale, AZ)	Stephanie Boswell Tanya Fields	Rene Helit	4th place
19	"Cooking for Sport"	Tailgate	Something Celebratory	Dip It	September 20, 2022	Bashas (Scottsdale, AZ)	Esther Choi Cliff Crooks	Angie Shaghaghi	WINNER
19	"Cooking for Sport"	Tailgate	Something Celebratory	Dip It	September 20, 2022	Bashas (Scottsdale, AZ)	Esther Choi Cliff Crooks	Sydian Mason	RUNNER-UP
19	"Cooking for Sport"	Tailgate	Something Celebratory	Dip It	September 20, 2022	Bashas (Scottsdale, AZ)	Esther Choi Cliff Crooks	Jennifer Flanders	3rd place
19	"Cooking for Sport"	Tailgate	Something Celebratory	Dip It	September 20, 2022	Bashas (Scottsdale, AZ)	Esther Choi Cliff Crooks	Chris Morales	4th place
20	"Boo Hoo in the Bayou"	Down by the Bayou	Hangover Helper	Warm and Toasty	September 20, 2022	Bashas (Scottsdale, AZ)	Eric Adjepong Alex Guarnaschelli	Emily Sullivan	WINNER
20	"Boo Hoo in the Bayou"	Down by the Bayou	Hangover Helper	Warm and Toasty	September 20, 2022	Bashas (Scottsdale, AZ)	Eric Adjepong Alex Guarnaschelli	Ashley DelRosario	RUNNER-UP
20	"Boo Hoo in the Bayou"	Down by the Bayou	Hangover Helper	Warm and Toasty	September 20, 2022	Bashas (Scottsdale, AZ)	Eric Adjepong Alex Guarnaschelli	James Armstrong	3rd place
20	"Boo Hoo in the Bayou"	Down by the Bayou	Hangover Helper	Warm and Toasty	September 20, 2022	Bashas (Scottsdale, AZ)	Eric Adjepong Alex Guarnaschelli	Brandi Cooper	4th place

=== Season 5 (2023) ===
No.	Title	Themes			Original air date	Store (location)	Judges	Contestant	Result
No.	Title	Round 1	Round 2	Round 3	Original air date	Store (location)	Judges	Contestant	Result
1	"Passport to the Parking Lot"	Italian Countryside	Moroccan Bazaar	Parisian Sidewalk	April 25, 2023	Ralph's (Manhattan Beach, CA)	Eric Adjepong Gabriele Bertaccini	Mike White	WINNER
1	"Passport to the Parking Lot"	Italian Countryside	Moroccan Bazaar	Parisian Sidewalk	April 25, 2023	Ralph's (Manhattan Beach, CA)	Eric Adjepong Gabriele Bertaccini	Kadra Evans	RUNNER-UP
1	"Passport to the Parking Lot"	Italian Countryside	Moroccan Bazaar	Parisian Sidewalk	April 25, 2023	Ralph's (Manhattan Beach, CA)	Eric Adjepong Gabriele Bertaccini	DeAndra Shouse	3rd place
1	"Passport to the Parking Lot"	Italian Countryside	Moroccan Bazaar	Parisian Sidewalk	April 25, 2023	Ralph's (Manhattan Beach, CA)	Eric Adjepong Gabriele Bertaccini	Terri Terrell	4th place
2	"Steak Your Claim"	Steakhouse Booth	Picnic Table Pleaser	Diner Counter Dessert	May 2, 2023	Ralph's (Manhattan Beach, CA)	Fariyal Abdullahi Darnell Ferguson	Jordan LLoyd	WINNER
2	"Steak Your Claim"	Steakhouse Booth	Picnic Table Pleaser	Diner Counter Dessert	May 2, 2023	Ralph's (Manhattan Beach, CA)	Fariyal Abdullahi Darnell Ferguson	Michelle Politano	RUNNER-UP
2	"Steak Your Claim"	Steakhouse Booth	Picnic Table Pleaser	Diner Counter Dessert	May 2, 2023	Ralph's (Manhattan Beach, CA)	Fariyal Abdullahi Darnell Ferguson	Jason Bruner	3rd place
2	"Steak Your Claim"	Steakhouse Booth	Picnic Table Pleaser	Diner Counter Dessert	May 2, 2023	Ralph's (Manhattan Beach, CA)	Fariyal Abdullahi Darnell Ferguson	Reniel Billups	4th place
3	"A Bittersweet Tale"	A Salty Start	Middle Aged	A Bittersweet Ending	May 9, 2023	Ralph's (Thousand Oaks, CA)	Stephanie Boswell Christian Petroni	Brooke Garlieb	WINNER
3	"A Bittersweet Tale"	A Salty Start	Middle Aged	A Bittersweet Ending	May 9, 2023	Ralph's (Thousand Oaks, CA)	Stephanie Boswell Christian Petroni	Naren Gosine	RUNNER-UP
3	"A Bittersweet Tale"	A Salty Start	Middle Aged	A Bittersweet Ending	May 9, 2023	Ralph's (Thousand Oaks, CA)	Stephanie Boswell Christian Petroni	Derricka Clayton	3rd place
3	"A Bittersweet Tale"	A Salty Start	Middle Aged	A Bittersweet Ending	May 9, 2023	Ralph's (Thousand Oaks, CA)	Stephanie Boswell Christian Petroni	Christian Petita	4th place
4	"Back to the Food-ture"	The Good Ol' Days	When You Were Young	Food From the Future	May 16, 2023	Ralph's (Manhattan Beach, CA)	Tiffani Faison Joe Sasto	Jordan Arcuri	WINNER
4	"Back to the Food-ture"	The Good Ol' Days	When You Were Young	Food From the Future	May 16, 2023	Ralph's (Manhattan Beach, CA)	Tiffani Faison Joe Sasto	Christopher Okorie	RUNNER-UP
4	"Back to the Food-ture"	The Good Ol' Days	When You Were Young	Food From the Future	May 16, 2023	Ralph's (Manhattan Beach, CA)	Tiffani Faison Joe Sasto	Alison Grace	3rd place
4	"Back to the Food-ture"	The Good Ol' Days	When You Were Young	Food From the Future	May 16, 2023	Ralph's (Manhattan Beach, CA)	Tiffani Faison Joe Sasto	Jeff Kraus	4th place
5	"Parking Lots Are for Lovers"	A Fancy Date	A Cheap Date	Seal the Deal Dessert	May 23, 2023	Ralph's (Thousand Oaks, CA)	Maneet Chauhan Jeff Mauro	Eleazar "Jet" Simon	WINNER
5	"Parking Lots Are for Lovers"	A Fancy Date	A Cheap Date	Seal the Deal Dessert	May 23, 2023	Ralph's (Thousand Oaks, CA)	Maneet Chauhan Jeff Mauro	Bridgette Andersen	RUNNER-UP
5	"Parking Lots Are for Lovers"	A Fancy Date	A Cheap Date	Seal the Deal Dessert	May 23, 2023	Ralph's (Thousand Oaks, CA)	Maneet Chauhan Jeff Mauro	Israel Rivera	3rd place
5	"Parking Lots Are for Lovers"	A Fancy Date	A Cheap Date	Seal the Deal Dessert	May 23, 2023	Ralph's (Thousand Oaks, CA)	Maneet Chauhan Jeff Mauro	Jessica Baldus	4th place
6	"Fast Food Frenzy"	Drive Thru Burger	Taco Stand Taco	Ice Cream Truck Dessert	May 30, 2023	Ralph's (Thousand Oaks, CA)	Andy Baraghari Eddie Jackson	Sera Cuni	WINNER
6	"Fast Food Frenzy"	Drive Thru Burger	Taco Stand Taco	Ice Cream Truck Dessert	May 30, 2023	Ralph's (Thousand Oaks, CA)	Andy Baraghari Eddie Jackson	Jeremy Echols	RUNNER-UP
6	"Fast Food Frenzy"	Drive Thru Burger	Taco Stand Taco	Ice Cream Truck Dessert	May 30, 2023	Ralph's (Thousand Oaks, CA)	Andy Baraghari Eddie Jackson	Ben Kitchen	3rd place
6	"Fast Food Frenzy"	Drive Thru Burger	Taco Stand Taco	Ice Cream Truck Dessert	May 30, 2023	Ralph's (Thousand Oaks, CA)	Andy Baraghari Eddie Jackson	Melissa Nielsen	4th place
7	"Judge-ment Day"	From the Can	From the Freezer	From the Farm	June 6, 2023	Ralph's (Thousand Oaks, CA)	Kalen Allen Susan Feniger	Maneet Chauhan	WINNER
7	"Judge-ment Day"	From the Can	From the Freezer	From the Farm	June 6, 2023	Ralph's (Thousand Oaks, CA)	Kalen Allen Susan Feniger	Jet Tila	RUNNER-UP
7	"Judge-ment Day"	From the Can	From the Freezer	From the Farm	June 6, 2023	Ralph's (Thousand Oaks, CA)	Kalen Allen Susan Feniger	Antonia Lofaso	3rd place
7	"Judge-ment Day"	From the Can	From the Freezer	From the Farm	June 6, 2023	Ralph's (Thousand Oaks, CA)	Kalen Allen Susan Feniger	Eddie Jackson	4th place
8	"Linner, Linner, No Chicken Dinner"	Morning Meal	Linner (Double Elimination)	Late Night Fridge Raid	June 13, 2023	Ralph's (Torrance, CA)	Jeremy McBryde Jet Tila	Zurisadai Resendiz	WINNER
8	"Linner, Linner, No Chicken Dinner"	Morning Meal	Linner (Double Elimination)	Late Night Fridge Raid	June 13, 2023	Ralph's (Torrance, CA)	Jeremy McBryde Jet Tila	Daya Myers-Hurt	RUNNER-UP
8	"Linner, Linner, No Chicken Dinner"	Morning Meal	Linner (Double Elimination)	Late Night Fridge Raid	June 13, 2023	Ralph's (Torrance, CA)	Jeremy McBryde Jet Tila	Jimmy Thomas	3rd place
8	"Linner, Linner, No Chicken Dinner"	Morning Meal	Linner (Double Elimination)	Late Night Fridge Raid	June 13, 2023	Ralph's (Torrance, CA)	Jeremy McBryde Jet Tila	Amanda Prainito	3rd place
9	"Oodles and Stacks and Cups, Oh My!"	Oodles of Noodles	Stacks of Sandwiches	Cups of Cocoa	June 20, 2023	Ralph's (Torrance, CA)	Darnell Ferguson Eric Greenspan	Wellington Onyenwe	WINNER
9	"Oodles and Stacks and Cups, Oh My!"	Oodles of Noodles	Stacks of Sandwiches	Cups of Cocoa	June 20, 2023	Ralph's (Torrance, CA)	Darnell Ferguson Eric Greenspan	Patrick Thezan	RUNNER-UP
9	"Oodles and Stacks and Cups, Oh My!"	Oodles of Noodles	Stacks of Sandwiches	Cups of Cocoa	June 20, 2023	Ralph's (Torrance, CA)	Darnell Ferguson Eric Greenspan	Jocelyn "Jos" Egleton	3rd place
9	"Oodles and Stacks and Cups, Oh My!"	Oodles of Noodles	Stacks of Sandwiches	Cups of Cocoa	June 20, 2023	Ralph's (Torrance, CA)	Darnell Ferguson Eric Greenspan	Rebekahh Abrams	4th place
10	"Shredding the Competition"	Pickled	Shredded	Glazed	June 27, 2023	Ralph's (Torrance, CA)	Elizabeth Heiskell Jet Tila	Jesse Albertini	WINNER
10	"Shredding the Competition"	Pickled	Shredded	Glazed	June 27, 2023	Ralph's (Torrance, CA)	Elizabeth Heiskell Jet Tila	Tarik Smallhorne	RUNNER-UP
10	"Shredding the Competition"	Pickled	Shredded	Glazed	June 27, 2023	Ralph's (Torrance, CA)	Elizabeth Heiskell Jet Tila	Fred Fluellen	3rd place
10	"Shredding the Competition"	Pickled	Shredded	Glazed	June 27, 2023	Ralph's (Torrance, CA)	Elizabeth Heiskell Jet Tila	Yanez Byll	4th place
11	"Cold and Hot in the Lot"	Make It Hot	Cool It Down	Hot and Cold Dessert	July 11, 2023	Ralph's (Torrance, CA)	Priya Krishna Justin Sutherland	Syerra Donaldson	WINNER
11	"Cold and Hot in the Lot"	Make It Hot	Cool It Down	Hot and Cold Dessert	July 11, 2023	Ralph's (Torrance, CA)	Priya Krishna Justin Sutherland	Mark Vecchitto	RUNNER-UP
11	"Cold and Hot in the Lot"	Make It Hot	Cool It Down	Hot and Cold Dessert	July 11, 2023	Ralph's (Torrance, CA)	Priya Krishna Justin Sutherland	Ken Aponte	3rd place
11	"Cold and Hot in the Lot"	Make It Hot	Cool It Down	Hot and Cold Dessert	July 11, 2023	Ralph's (Torrance, CA)	Priya Krishna Justin Sutherland	Brogan Wu	4th place
12	"Skewer, Punch, & Whip"	You're Skewered	Roll It Up	Whip It	July 18, 2023	Ralph's (Torrance, CA)	Mei Lin Joe Sasto	Isaac Gamboa	WINNER
12	"Skewer, Punch, & Whip"	You're Skewered	Roll It Up	Whip It	July 18, 2023	Ralph's (Torrance, CA)	Mei Lin Joe Sasto	Cris Brown	RUNNER-UP
12	"Skewer, Punch, & Whip"	You're Skewered	Roll It Up	Whip It	July 18, 2023	Ralph's (Torrance, CA)	Mei Lin Joe Sasto	Ariel Malone	3rd place
12	"Skewer, Punch, & Whip"	You're Skewered	Roll It Up	Whip It	July 18, 2023	Ralph's (Torrance, CA)	Mei Lin Joe Sasto	Alyssa Wright	4th place
13	"Three Meals A Day"	Breakfast in Bed	Brown Bag Lunch	Delivery Dinner	July 25, 2023	Ralph's (Torrance, CA)	Carlos Anthony Antonia Lofaso	Judy Reyna	WINNER
13	"Three Meals A Day"	Breakfast in Bed	Brown Bag Lunch	Delivery Dinner	July 25, 2023	Ralph's (Torrance, CA)	Carlos Anthony Antonia Lofaso	Benjamin Leggitte	RUNNER-UP
13	"Three Meals A Day"	Breakfast in Bed	Brown Bag Lunch	Delivery Dinner	July 25, 2023	Ralph's (Torrance, CA)	Carlos Anthony Antonia Lofaso	Anne-Marie Marzetti	3rd place
13	"Three Meals A Day"	Breakfast in Bed	Brown Bag Lunch	Delivery Dinner	July 25, 2023	Ralph's (Torrance, CA)	Carlos Anthony Antonia Lofaso	Henry Pineda	4th place
