= Tournament of Champions (TV series) =

American reality cooking show

- Poster for Season 3
- Genre: Reality; Cooking; Game show
- Starring: Guy Fieri
- Country of origin: United States
- Original language: English

Production
- Executive producers: Guy Fieri; Brian Lando; Francesco Giuseppe Pace; Bryan Johnson
- Running time: 120 Minutes

Original release
- Network: Food Network
- Release: March 4, 2020 – present

Tournament of Champions is an American reality cooking competition series broadcast by Food Network. Created and hosted by Guy Fieri, the series features alumni of other Food Network competition series competing in a single-elimination tournament for a grand prize in a blind-judged competition.

Winners are Brooke Williamson, Maneet Chauhan (twice), Tiffani Faison, Mei Lin, Antonia Lofaso, and Bryan Voltaggio.

== Format ==
The competition is a single-elimination tournament consisting primarily of alumni or champions of other cooking competition series (particularly, those aired by Food Network). In each match, the two participating chefs must cook a dish with parameters determined by "the Randomizer"—a slot machine-like board with five reels that are spun by Fieri to determine the key factors of each match, which have included required protein and produce ingredients, required equipment, cooking style, the time limit, and "Wild Card" elements (such as additional styles or ingredients, re-spinning selected reels, audience or host's choice, etc.).

When time expires, the completed dishes are judged and scored blind by a panel of judges (usually three) to determine the winner. The dishes are presented to the judges not by the chefs themselves, but by a team of "sideline reporters" who observe the chefs' progress during the round. In addition, the judges are not told of the competition roster at any point during the tournament so they can offer unbiased opinions on the dishes placed before them.

Judges can award up to 100 points on each dish, broken down as follows:

- 50 points for taste
- 40 points for adhering to the Randomizer conditions
- 10 points for plating

The higher-scoring chef advances to the next round, while the lower-scoring one is eliminated. Ties are broken by comparing scores from the individual categories in the above order. If the chefs tie in all three categories, they compete again with a new set of Randomizer spins.

For the sixth season onward, the geographic divisions were eliminated, and all four previous season winners exited the competition to take on other roles in the production. Tiffani Faison became a sideline reporter and Maneet Chauhan, Brooke Williamson, and Mei Lin became judges.

== Analysis of results ==
The competition has been called remarkable for the domination by women chefs, which is not common in American televised cooking competitions. According to AP News, it is "the only cooking competition series that includes people of all genders where no man has ever won, let alone made it as a top-two finalist."

It speculated that the reason had to do with the blind tasting format, in which the judges are not told the competition roster at any time in order to eliminate subconscious bias. Results in other American televised cooking competitions tend to favor male chefs; 71% of the winners of Top Chef and 60% of the winners of Chopped, both of which use non-blind judging, have been men. Maneet Chauhan, who won the competition twice, believes the format requires the ability to multitask, a skill she believes women are socialized to develop.

Tournament of Champions season 7 broke this streak with an all male final four and the first male champion in Bryan Voltaggio.

== Seasons ==
=== Season 1 ===
Season 1 premiered on March 4, 2020. Judges for the season included Marcus Samuelsson, Nancy Silverton, Curtis Stone, Jonathan Waxman, Ming Tsai and Traci Des Jardins.

Justin Warner and Simon Majumdar act as the sideline reporters, delivering real-time play-by-play to the live audience, and presenting and explaining the dishes to the judges during the blind tasting.

The Season 1 champion is Brooke Williamson.

==== West ====
First Round
1	Antonia Lofaso	92
8	Marcel Vigneron	89
4	Beau MacMillan	81
5	Richard Blais	76
2	Michael Voltaggio	90
7	Brooke Williamson	96
3	Eric Greenspan	72
6	Jet Tila	76

Quarterfinals
Antonia Lofaso	96
Beau MacMillan	85
Brooke Williamson	94
Jet Tila	83

Semifinals
Antonia Lofaso	89
Brooke Williamson	92

==== East ====
First Round
1	Alex Guarnaschelli	71
8	Darnell Ferguson	72
4	Amanda Freitag	92
5	Elizabeth Falkner	82
2	Marc Murphy	84
7	Christian Petroni	85
3	Rocco DiSpirito	81
6	Maneet Chauhan	91

Quarterfinals
Darnell Ferguson	78
Amanda Freitag	82
Christian Petroni	89
Maneet Chauhan	93

Semifinals
Amanda Freitag	87
Maneet Chauhan	85

==== Final ====
Finals
W	Brooke Williamson	88
E	Amanda Freitag	87

=== Season 2 ===
Season 2 began on March 7, 2021. Judges for the season included Marcus Samuelsson, Nancy Silverton, Rocco DiSpirito, Jonathan Waxman, Traci Des Jardins, Scott Conant, Giada De Laurentiis and Ming Tsai.

Justin Warner and Simon Majumdar return as the sideline reporters, delivering real-time play-by-play to the live audience, and presenting and explaining the dishes to the judges during the blind tasting.

The Season 2 champion is Maneet Chauhan.

==== West ====
First Round
1	Brooke Williamson	92
8	Nyesha Arrington	88
4	Cat Cora	90
5	Michael Voltaggio	95
2	Antonia Lofaso	87
7	Brian Malarkey	85
3	Jet Tila	90
6	Aaron May	84

Quarterfinals
Brooke Williamson	91
Michael Voltaggio	88
Antonia Lofaso	91
Jet Tila	92

Semifinals
Brooke Williamson	90
Jet Tila	83

Note: In their first quarterfinal match, Tila and Lofaso tied with 93 and with identical distributions of scores, so they competed again with a new set of randomizer ingredients.

==== East ====
First Round
1	Amanda Freitag	87
8	Tiffani Faison	90
4	Darnell Ferguson	88
5	Marc Murphy	82
2	Maneet Chauhan	83
7	Madison Cowan	76
3	Christian Petroni	83
6	Bryan Voltaggio	80

Quarterfinals
Tiffani Faison	80
Darnell Ferguson	85
Maneet Chauhan	83
Christian Petroni	80

Semifinals
Darnell Ferguson	89
Maneet Chauhan	90

==== Final ====
Finals
W	Brooke Williamson	90
E	Maneet Chauhan	93

=== Season 3 ===
Season 3 began on February 27, 2022, with the season featuring a grand prize of $100,000. Judges for the season included Nancy Silverton, Rocco DiSpirito, Jonathan Waxman, Traci Des Jardins, Scott Conant, Alex Guarnaschelli, Cat Cora, Ming Tsai, Giada De Laurentiis, Lorena Garcia, Eric Ripert, Dominique Crenn and Masaharu Morimoto.

Justin Warner and Simon Majumdar return as the sideline reporters, delivering real-time play-by-play to the live audience, and presenting and explaining the dishes to the judges during the blind tasting.

The Season 3 champion is Tiffani Faison.

==== West A ====
First Round
1	Brooke Williamson	85
8	Crista Luedtke	79
4	Aaron May	78
5	Brian Malarkey	82
2	Michael Voltaggio	82
7	Phillip Frankland Lee	79
3	Timothy Hollingsworth	88
6	Tiffany Derry	90

Second Round
Brooke Williamson	87
Brian Malarkey	80
Michael Voltaggio	93
Tiffany Derry	85

Quarterfinals
Brooke Williamson	84
Michael Voltaggio	83

==== West B ====
First Round
1	Jet Tila	85
8	Carlos Anthony	81
4	Chris Cosentino	80
5	Elizabeth Falkner	84
2	Antonia Lofaso	80
7	Joe Sasto	82
3	Shirley Chung	83
6	Marcel Vigneron	74

Second Round
Jet Tila	89
Elizabeth Falkner	88
Joe Sasto	90
Shirley Chung	93

Quarterfinals
Jet Tila	80
Shirley Chung	71

==== East A ====
First Round
1	Maneet Chauhan	82
8	Richard Hales	81
4	Kelsey Barnard Clark	75
5	Eric Adjepong	79
2	Amanda Freitag	Winner
7	Madison Cowan	Disqualified
3	Tiffani Faison	85
6	Bryan Voltaggio	83

Second Round
Maneet Chauhan	78
Eric Adjepong	72
Amanda Freitag	85
Tiffani Faison	87

Quarterfinals
Maneet Chauhan	80
Tiffani Faison	83

==== East B ====
First Round
1	Darnell Ferguson	84
8	Aarthi Sampath	86
4	Karen Akunowicz	84
5	Justin Sutherland	77
2	Christian Petroni	74
7	Tobias Dorzon	75
3	Michael Psilakis	76
6	Einat Admony	79

Second Round
Aarthi Sampath	74
Karen Akunowicz	74
Tobias Dorzon	81
Einat Admony	77

Quarterfinals
Karen Akunowicz	79
Tobias Dorzon	81

Note: When there is a tied final score, the competitor who had the higher score in the 'Taste' category will move on.

==== Final Four ====
Semifinals
WA	Brooke Williamson	84
WB	Jet Tila	82
EA	Tiffani Faison	91
EB	Tobias Dorzon	84

Finals
Brooke Williamson	90
Tiffani Faison	92

=== Season 4 ===
Season 4 began on February 19, 2023. Judges for the season include Scott Conant, Alex Guarnaschelli, Nancy Silverton, Ming Tsai, Andrew Zimmern, Jonathan Waxman, Michelle Bernstein, Daniela Soto-Innes, Daniel Boulud and Cat Cora.

Justin Warner and Simon Majumdar return as the sideline reporters, delivering real-time play-by-play to the live audience, and presenting and explaining the dishes to the judges during the blind tasting. Hunter Fieri joins as backstage reporter, interviewing the winning chefs of their reactions.

The Season 4 champion is Mei Lin.

==== West A ====
First Round
1	Jet Tila	84
8	Carlos Anthony	77
4	Brian Malarkey	84
5	Lee Anne Wong	86
2	Shirley Chung	86
7	Tracey Shepos Cenami	79
3	Nate Appleman	83
6	Adam Sobel	90

Second Round
Jet Tila	83
Lee Anne Wong	78
Shirley Chung	85
Adam Sobel	87

Quarterfinals
Jet Tila	88
Adam Sobel	86

==== West B ====
First Round
1	Antonia Lofaso	84
8	Shota Nakajima	86
4	Joe Sasto	86
5	Elizabeth Falkner	85
2	Tiffany Derry	86
7	Viet Pham	80
3	Mei Lin	84
6	Crista Luedtke	82

Second Round
Shota Nakajima	84
Joe Sasto	80
Tiffany Derry	85
Mei Lin	92

Quarterfinals
Shota Nakajima	84
Mei Lin	91

==== East A ====
First Round
1	Tiffani Faison	88
8	Britt Rescigno	89
4	Darnell Ferguson	84
5	Ilan Hall	79
2	Jose Garces	89
7	Kelsey Barnard Clark	85
3	Graham Elliot	81
6	Eric Adjepong	85

Second Round
Britt Rescigno	83
Darnell Ferguson	81
Jose Garces	79
Eric Adjepong	75

Quarterfinals
Britt Rescigno	85
Jose Garces	81

==== East B ====
First Round
1	Tobias Dorzon	88
8	Leah Cohen	86
4	Karen Akunowicz	86
5	Christian Petroni	80
2	Maneet Chauhan	92
7	Jonathon Sawyer	85
3	Stephanie Izard	86
6	Madison Cowan	85

Second Round
Tobias Dorzon	80
Karen Akunowicz	82
Maneet Chauhan	86
Stephanie Izard	84

Quarterfinals
Karen Akunowicz	81
Maneet Chauhan	88

==== Final Four ====
Semifinals
WA	Jet Tila	87
WB	Mei Lin	90
EA	Britt Rescigno	80
EB	Maneet Chauhan	87

Finals
Mei Lin	91
Maneet Chauhan	89

=== Season 5 ===
Season 5 began airing on February 18, 2024. Judges for the season included Donatella Arpaia, Scott Conant, Rocco DiSpirito, Susan Feniger, Lorena Garcia, Carla Hall, Michael Mina, Eric Ripert, Marcus Samuelsson, Nancy Silverton, Ming Tsai, Andrew Zimmern, Jonathan Waxman, Michael White, Geoffrey Zakarian, and Cat Cora.

Justin Warner and Simon Majumdar returned as the sideline reporters, delivering real-time play-by-play to the live audience, and presenting and explaining the dishes to the judges during the blind tasting. Hunter Fieri returned as backstage reporter, interviewing the winning chefs of their reactions.

The Season 5 champion was Maneet Chauhan, the first repeat winner of the competition.

==== West A Qualifiers ====
First Round
1	Kevin Lee	79
4	Maria Mazon	74
3	Aaron May	74
2	Bruce Kalman	75

Second Round
Kevin Lee	80
Bruce Kalman	76

==== West B Qualifiers ====
First Round
1	Ray Garcia	80
4	Pyet DeSpain	68
3	Claudia Sandoval	74
2	Michael Reed	77

Second Round
Ray Garcia	78
Michael Reed	79

==== East A Qualifiers ====
First Round
1	Nini Nguyen	90
4	Gerald Sombright	74
3	Ilan Hall	77
2	Leah Cohen	80

Second Round
Nini Nguyen	81
Leah Cohen	78

==== East B Qualifiers ====
First Round
1	Demetrio Zavala	84
4	Justin Sutherland	74
3	Adriana Urbina	74
2	Chris Scott	79

Second Round
Demetrio Zavala	71
Chris Scott	75

==== West A ====
First Round
1	Brooke Williamson	87
8	Kevin Lee	88
4	Shirley Chung	89
5	Joe Sasto	86
2	Michael Voltaggio	92
7	Crista Luedtke	89
3	Antonia Lofaso	92
6	Casey Thompson	83

Second Round
Kevin Lee	90
Shirley Chung	86
Michael Voltaggio	82
Antonia Lofaso	84

Quarterfinals
Kevin Lee	81
Antonia Lofaso	85

==== West B ====
First Round
1	Mei Lin	79
8	Michael Reed	76
4	Adam Sobel	89
5	Lee Anne Wong	93
2	Jet Tila	84
7	Brian Malarkey	82
3	Shota Nakajima	81
6	Carlos Anthony	82

Second Round
Mei Lin	89
Lee Anne Wong	83
Jet Tila	79
Carlos Anthony	79

Quarterfinals
Mei Lin	79
Jet Tila	82

Note: In the case of a tie score, the competitor who has the higher score in the 'Taste' category is declared the winner.

==== East A ====
First Round
1	Maneet Chauhan	83
8	Nini Nguyen	76
4	Stephanie Izard	88
5	Eric Adjepong	90
2	Karen Akunowicz	82
7	Dale Talde	84
3	Tobias Dorzon	83
6	Kelsey Barnard Clark	79

Second Round
Maneet Chauhan	86
Eric Adjepong	83
Dale Talde	75
Tobias Dorzon	80

Quarterfinals
Maneet Chauhan	86
Tobias Dorzon	84

==== East B ====
First Round
1	Tiffani Faison	93
8	Chris Scott	85
4	Amanda Freitag	79
5	Darnell Ferguson	77
2	Britt Rescigno	78
7	Jonathon Sawyer	74
3	Jose Garces	82
6	Marc Murphy	85

Second Round
Tiffani Faison	79
Amanda Freitag	81
Britt Rescigno	84
Marc Murphy	80

Quarterfinals
Amanda Freitag	80
Britt Rescigno	83

==== Final Four ====
Semifinals
WA	Antonia Lofaso	86
WB	Jet Tila	83
EA	Maneet Chauhan	86
EB	Britt Rescigno	81

Finals
Antonia Lofaso	89
Maneet Chauhan	90

=== Season 6 ===
Season 6 began airing on March 2, 2025. In this season the regional nature of the brackets was eliminated. No previous winners competed.

Judges for the season include Scott Conant, Cat Cora, Susan Feniger, Alex Guarnaschelli, Mary Sue Milliken, Charlie Palmer, Wolfgang Puck, Marcus Samuelsson, Nancy Silverton, Michael Symon, Ming Tsai, Jonathan Waxman, Andrew Zimmern. Previous champions Maneet Chauhan (Seasons 2 and 5), Mei Lin (Season 4), and Brooke Williamson (Season 1) became judges.

Justin Warner returned, with Season 3 champion Tiffani Faison joining him as sideline reporters, delivering real-time play-by-play to the live audience, and presenting & explaining the dishes to the judges during the blind tasting. Hunter Fieri returned as backstage reporter, interviewing the winning chefs of their reactions. Simon Majumdar took on a new role as the judges' correspondent, getting reviews from judges as to why a dish received a win or a loss.

For the final battle, a fourth judge--Martha Stewart—was brought in to decide the winner and Season 6 champion, Antonia Lofaso.

==== Division A ====
First Round
1	Antonia Lofaso	86
8	Maria Mazon	82
4	Tim Love	80
5	Rocco Dispirito	83
2	Adam Sobel	79
7	Adriana Urbina	74
3	Kevin Lee	83
6	Casey Thompson	81

Second Round
Antonia Lofaso	88
Rocco Dispirito	83
Adam Sobel	75
Kevin Lee	82

Quarterfinals
Antonia Lofaso	88
Kevin Lee	85

==== Division B ====
First Round
1	Britt Rescigno	85
8	Chris Oh	84
4	Stephanie Izard	84
5	Michael Reed	86
2	Shota Nakajima	88
7	Brittany Anderson	84
3	Kaleena Bliss	80
6	Chris Cosentino	78

Second Round
Britt Rescigno	80
Michael Reed	76
Shota Nakajima	79
Kaleena Bliss	86

Quarterfinals
Britt Rescigno	88
Kaleena Bliss	85

==== Division C ====
First Round
1	Jet Tila	91
8	Pyet Despain	84
4	Joe Sasto	81
5	Fabio Viviani	76
2	Karen Akunowicz	79
7	Jonathon Sawyer	82
3	Lee Anne Wong	85
6	Chris Scott	80

Second Round
Jet Tila	91
Joe Sasto	93
Jonathon Sawyer	83
Lee Anne Wong	84

Quarterfinals
Joe Sasto	84
Lee Anne Wong	87

==== Division D ====
First Round
1	Tobias Dorzon	85
8	David Viana	91
4	Dale Talde	72
5	Sara Bradley	76
2	Amanda Freitag	85
7	Carlos Anthony	87
3	Claudette Zepeda	79
6	Nini Nguyen	86

Second Round
David Viana	86
Sara Bradley	87
Carlos Anthony	79
Nini Nguyen	80

Quarterfinals
Sara Bradley	90
Nini Nguyen	86

==== Final Four ====
Semifinals
A	Antonia Lofaso	82
B	Britt Rescigno	82
C	Lee Anne Wong	83
D	Sara Bradley	85

Finals
Antonia Lofaso	88
Sara Bradley	82

Note: When there is a tied final score, the competitor who had the higher score in the 'Taste' category is declared the winner.

=== Season 7 ===
Season 7 began airing on February 15, 2026. The first four episodes were buy-in qualifiers, with the chefs randomly selected to compete with each other. Winners of each match were placed into the 7th and 8th seeds in the main brackets. Once the main bracket began, no previous winners competed and it was revealed the number 1 seed in each bracket was a "Secret Culinary Icon," none of whom had competed previously.

Judges for the season include Alex Guarnaschelli, Dominique Crenn, Cat Cora, Curtis Stone, David Chang, Geoffrey Zakarian, Hubert Keller, Judy Joo, Ken Oringer, Marcus Samuelsson, Michelle Bernstein, Nancy Silverton, Rocco DiSpirito, Scott Conant, and Susan Feniger and previous champions Brooke Williamson (Season 1), Maneet Chauhan (Seasons 2 and 5), Mei Lin (Season 4), and Antonia Lofaso (Season 6). It is safe to rule out all of these chefs as the mystery "culinary icons."

As in Season 6, Justin Warner and Tiffani Faison returned as sideline reporters and presenters to the judges, Hunter Fieri as backstage correspondent, and Simon Majumdar as the judges' correspondent.

The Season 7 champion is Bryan Voltaggio, the first man to win the competition.

==== Division A ====
First Round
1	Icon: Ming Tsai	84
8	Aarti Sequeira	85
4	Jonathon Sawyer	89
5	Karen Akunowicz	86
2	Jet Tila	88
7	Ashleigh Shanti	80
3	Tobias Dorzon	85
6	Claudette Zepeda	87

Second Round
Aarti Sequeira	79
Jonathon Sawyer	85
Jet Tila	80
Claudette Zepeda	75

Quarterfinals
Jonathon Sawyer	78
Jet Tila	79

==== Division B ====
First Round
1	Icon: Lorena Garcia	88
8	Katsuji Tanabe	85
4	Nini Nguyen	79
5	Joe Sasto	83
2	Britt Rescigno	92
7	Giuseppe Tentori	88
3	Kevin Lee	90
6	Adam Greenberg	80

Second Round
Lorena Garcia	77
Joe Sasto	80
Britt Rescigno	75
Kevin Lee	80

Quarterfinals
Joe Sasto	76
Kevin Lee	84

==== Division C ====
First Round
1	Icon: Jonathan Waxman	80
8	Viet Pham	82
4	Dale Talde	87
5	Shirley Chung	94
2	Sara Bradley	84
7	Dan Jacobs	87
3	Bryan Voltaggio	82
6	Carlos Anthony	79

Second Round
Viet Pham	80
Shirley Chung	87
Dan Jacobs	77
Bryan Voltaggio	80

Quarterfinals
Shirley Chung	85
Bryan Voltaggio	87

==== Division D ====
First Round
1	Icon: Aarón Sánchez	76
8	Kenny Gilbert	81
4	Kaleena Bliss	79
5	Adam Sobel	77
2	Lee Anne Wong	77
7	Stephanie Izard	80
3	Marcel Vigneron	87
6	David Viana	81

Second Round
Kenny Gilbert	91
Kaleena Bliss	81
Stephanie Izard	84
Marcel Vigneron	79

Quarterfinals
Kenny Gilbert	78
Stephanie Izard	74

==== Final Four ====
Semifinals
A	Jet Tila	81
B	Kevin Lee	83
C	Bryan Voltaggio	94
D	Kenny Gilbert	88

Finals
Kevin Lee	83
Bryan Voltaggio	84

Note: When there is a tied final score, the competitor who had the higher score in the 'Taste' category is declared the winner.
