= Antonia Lofaso =

American chef

- Born: November 23, 1976 (age 49); Long Island, New York, U.S.
- Education: International Culinary Center
- Culinary career
- Current restaurants: Black Market Liquor Bar, Los Angeles (2011–present), * Scopa Italian Roots, Los Angeles (2013–present), * DAMA, Los Angeles (2018–present)
- Television shows: Top Chef: Chicago (2008), * Top Chef: All-Stars (2010-2011), * Chopped (2015, 2022), * Cutthroat Kitchen (2013–2017), * Restaurant Startup (2015– 2016), * Tournament of Champions (2024-2025)

Antonia Marie Lofaso (born November 23, 1976) is an American celebrity chef and restaurateur. She has appeared on the reality television shows Top Chef, Chopped, Cutthroat Kitchen and Restaurant Startup, among others. Lofaso owns the restaurants Black Market Liquor Bar, Scopa Italian Roots, and DAMA in Los Angeles, California.

== Restaurant career ==
Lofaso attended the French Culinary Institute (later known as the International Culinary Center, now defunct) in New York City; during that time, she was also a manager at Sean Combs' restaurant, Justin. She then worked as a chef at the Los Angeles restaurants Spago and Foxtail.

Lofaso is currently a co-owner and the executive chef of the Los Angeles restaurants Black Market Liquor Bar, DAMA, and Scopa Italian Roots.

=== Restaurants ===
- Black Market Liquor Bar (2011–present), Los Angeles
- Scopa Italian Roots (2013–present), Los Angeles
- DAMA (2018–present), Los Angeles
- The Local Peasant, Woodland Hills and Sherman Oaks

== Television career ==
In 2008, Lofaso appeared as a contestant on season four of the competition series Top Chef, also known as Top Chef: Chicago; she came in fourth place. She appeared on season eight of Top Chef, known as Top Chef: All-Stars, from 2010 to 2011, coming in third place. In 2014 she appeared on an episode of Top Chef Duels, competing against Mike Isabella, who had beaten her on Top Chef: All-Stars; she won the "duel."

In 2012, Lofaso appeared on the short-lived Game Show Network show Beat the Chefs; she was one of three professional chefs that the amateur chef contestants had to compete against. The show ran for four episodes.

She was one of a rotating group of judges on the 2013 to 2017 Food Network competition show Cutthroat Kitchen. She also competed in (and won) Cutthroat's special 2016 "Judging Judges" episode, beating fellow regular judges Simon Majumdar and Jet Tila as well as Iron Chef Geoffrey Zakarian. She is a judge on Guy's Grocery Games, which premiered in 2013. She has also competed (and won) frequently on that show, beginning a long-standing association with Guy Fieri who calls her the "Warrior Princess"

Lofaso served as one of the restaurant culinary consultants for the CNBC television show Restaurant Startup (seasons 2 and 3), in 2015 and 2016. In 2020, she appeared on Selena Gomez's cooking show, Selena + Chef. She also made an appearance on the 16th season of The Bachelorette during the hometown episode.

Lofaso was one of four chefs featured in the Fieri-produced documentary film Restaurant Hustle 2020: All On The Line, focusing on how the COVID-19 pandemic affected their lives and businesses. She returned for the film's sequel documentary, Restaurant Hustle 2021: Back In Business.

In January 2022, Lofaso appeared as the lead judge on Guy’s Chance Of A Lifetime. She was the head judge on the Food Network competition show The Julia Child Challenge, which aired in March and April 2022. In the summers of 2022 and 2023, she hosted Beachside Brawl, and from August through November 2022, she served as co-host of Guy's Ultimate Game Night. In January 2025, she co-hosted season 28 of Worst Cooks in America, replacing original host Anne Burrell.

She has also competed in the first six seasons of Tournament of Champions, losing to Maneet Chauhan in the final of season 5 (2024), then winning in season 6 (2025) by defeating Sara Bradley in the final.

== Personal life ==
Lofaso was born on November 23, 1976 on Long Island, New York. When she was eight, Lofaso moved to Northridge, Los Angeles, California with her parents. Lofaso has Italian (Sicilian) and Jewish roots.

Lofaso's daughter Xea Myers was born in 2000 from her relationship with the late Jamaican-American rapper Heavy D.
