= Tobias Dorzon =

American chef and football player (born 1984)

- Born: Bloi-Dei Dorzon; November 23, 1984 (age 41)
- Education: Lackawanna College, Jackson State University, Art Institute of Washington
- Culinary career
- Current restaurants: Huncho House, Hyattsville, Maryland (2022–present) *Thirteen Restaurant Houston, Texas (2021–present), *Union District Oyster Bar, Washington, D.C. (2018–present)
- Previous restaurants: Victory Chefs food truck, Washington, D.C. (2014–2018), Victory Chef Restaurant, Miami, Florida

Tobias Dorzon (né Bloi-Dei Dorzon; born November 23, 1984) is an American chef, restaurateur, and former professional football player. His cooking has been influenced by his West African heritage. Dorzon has appeared on Chopped, Tournament of Champions, Last Bite Hotel, and Guy's Grocery Games.

== Early life ==
Dorzon's parents are immigrants from Liberia who raised him in Maryland. His father owned a West African restaurant. He attended Lackawanna College and Jackson State University.

== Football career ==
Dorzon played for the Tampa Bay Buccaneers, the Tennessee Titans of the National Football League, and the Winnipeg Blue Bombers in the Canadian Football League.

== Culinary career ==
In 2012, during the football off season, Dorzon attended the International Culinary School at the Art Institute of Washington.

In 2018 Dorzon opened Union District Oyster Bar and Lounge in Washington, D.C. In 2021, he helped open Thirteen Restaurant in Houston, Texas. In 2022, he opened the restaurant Huncho House in Hyattsville, Maryland, where he serves as the executive head chef.

== Personal life ==
On November 5, 2024, Dorzon was shot in an apparent robbery in Hyattsville. In November 2025, Dorzon competed on a holiday version of Tournament of Champions; it was his first appearance back on Food Network since the shooting. He told the media that he was shot 11 times after getting out of an Uber with his girlfriend, with at least $100,000 worth of jewelry stolen. As of November 2025, one person was caught and is facing criminal charges, while others have still yet to be caught.
