= Restaurant Startup =

American reality television series

- Genre: Reality show
- Created by: Chris Culvenor
- Starring: Joe Bastianich; Tim Love; Elizabeth Blau (season 3); Waylynn Lucas (season 1); Antonia Lofaso (season 2–3)
- Country of origin: United States
- Original language: English
- No. of seasons: 3
- No. of episodes: 27

Production
- Executive producer: Eden Gaha
- Production company: Shine America

Original release
- Network: CNBC
- Release: July 8, 2014 – March 2, 2016

Restaurant Startup is an American food competition series that aired for three seasons on CNBC, from 2014 to 2016. In the show, two judge-investors meet with aspiring chefs, taste their food, hear their concept and decide whom they want to support in their food career. During the first two seasons, the judges-investors were celebrity restaurateurs Joe Bastianich and Tim Love. In the third season, the judges-investors were Bastianich, Love and Elizabeth Blau, with two of the three appearing in each episode.

Each episode is divided into four parts: first, judges-investors choose among two competing pitches for a new restaurant. Then, the winning team gets $7,500, a location and various helpers to refine their restaurant idea (including logo design, decor, and menu) and turn the concept into a functioning restaurant in 36 hours. Then, customers are brought in and the team runs the restaurant over several hours. Finally, the team meets with the investors, and one or both of the investors may then make an investment offer.

The series premiered on July 8, 2014. Its final episode aired on March 2, 2016.

== Episodes ==
=== Season 1 ===
No. in series	No. in season	Episode title	Original air date
1	1	"Exotic Eats, U.S. Currency"	July 8, 2014
2	2	"A Truck Load of Money"	July 15, 2014
3	3	"Cold Cash for Warm Bread"	July 22, 2014
4	4	"Small Plate, Big Money"	July 29, 2014
5	5	"Pasta-bilities for Investment"	August 5, 2014
6	6	"Sweet Investment"	August 12, 2014
7	7	"Comfort Food Cash-In"	August 19, 2014
8	8	"The Best Ingredient for Investment"	August 26, 2014

=== Season 2 ===
No. in series	No. in season	Episode title	Original air date	U.S. viewers
9	1	"Vision of Vietnamese"	January 13, 2015	N/A
10	2	"The Comeback Cook"	January 20, 2015	N/A
11	3	"Young Hustlers"	January 27, 2015	524,000
12	4	"Seconds, Please!"	February 2, 2015	N/A
13	5	"From the Streets"	February 10, 2015	N/A
14	6	"Movin' Out"	February 17, 2015	441,000
15	7	"The Ultimate Cockfight"	February 24, 2015	N/A
16	8	"Pie vs. Pie"	March 3, 2015	N/A
17	9	"Small Markets, Big Dreams"	March 10, 2015	286,000
18	10	"The Food of the Future"	March 17, 2015	393,000

=== Season 3 ===
No. in series	No. in season	Episode title	Original air date	U.S. viewers
19	1	"Raising the Stakes"	January 6, 2016	399,000
20	2	"A Star is Born"	January 13, 2016	295,000
21	3	"From the Ashes"	January 20, 2016	251,000
22	4	"Fast, Cheap, and Out of the Box!"	January 27, 2016	385,000
23	5	"A Place in the Sun"	February 3, 2016	305,000
24	6	"Late-night Munchies"	February 10, 2016	
25	7	"Cutting the Apron Strings"	February 17, 2016	
26	8	"Act Now, Before It's Too Late!"	February 24, 2016	
27	9	"Too Hot to Handle"	March 2, 2016	

== See also ==
- Shark Tank
