= Nini Nguyen =

American chef

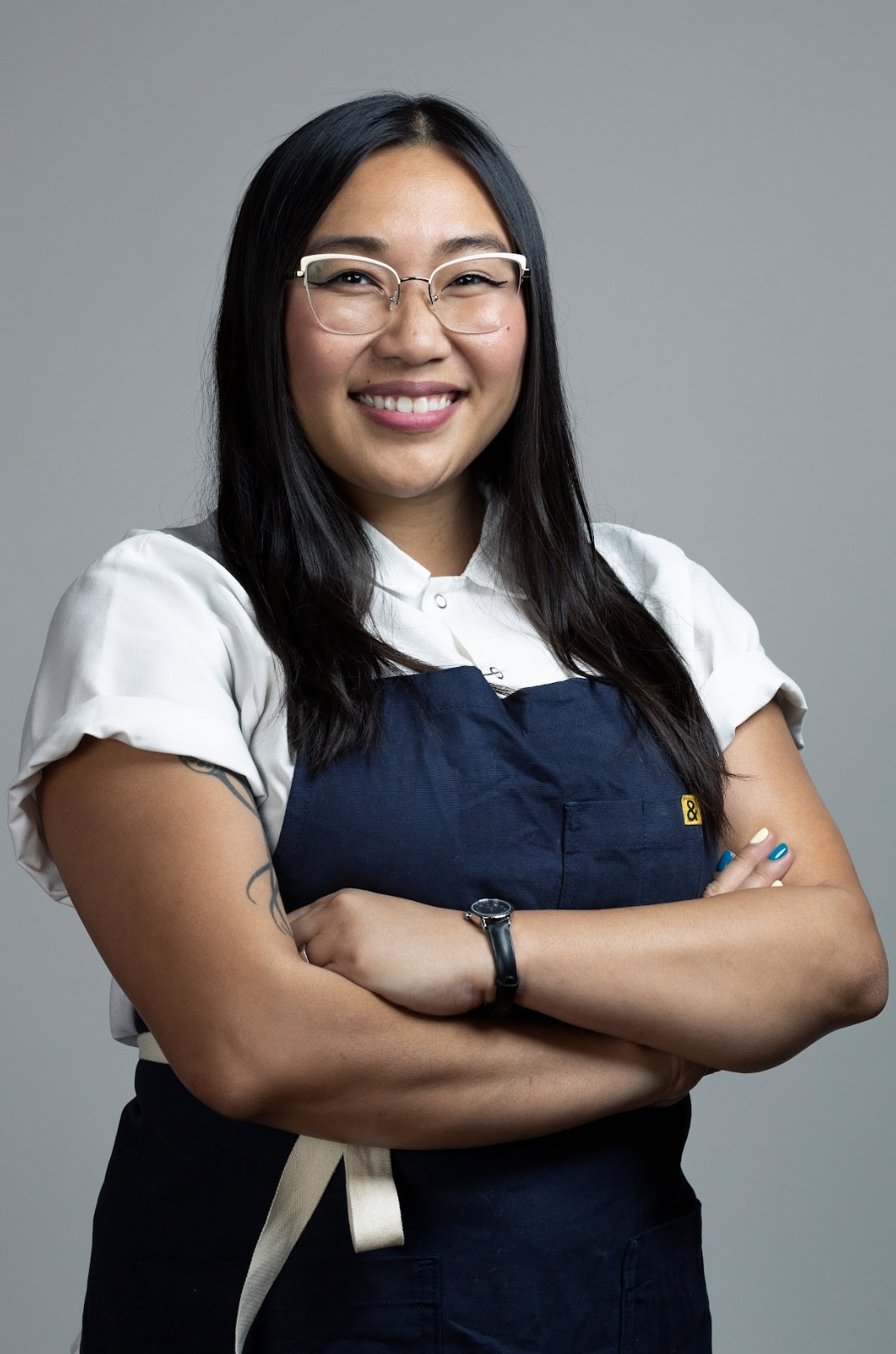
- Nguyen in 2020
- Born: New Orleans, Louisiana, U.S.
- Occupation(s): Chef, author
- Years active: 2010–present
- Known for: Top Chef: Kentucky; Top Chef: All-Stars L.A. Tournament of Champions; Last Bite Hotel
- Website: www.chefnininguyen.com

Nini Nguyen is an American chef. Based in New Orleans, she is known for her appearances on Top Chef: Kentucky, Top Chef: All-Stars L.A., and Last Bite Hotel. Her first book Đặc Biệt: An Extra-Special Vietnamese Cookbook was released in August 2024 under Knopf. In 2024, Nguyen won the debut season of Last Bite Hotel on Food Network.

== Early life and education ==
Nguyen was born and raised in New Orleans, Louisiana. Her family immigrated to the area in the 1970s. Her grandmother taught her to cook; Nguyen referred to her grandmother as "a huge influence as to why I became a chef."

She attended Louisiana State University and received her bachelor's degree in business. However, Nguyen graduated during the Great Recession and struggled to find work. She enrolled in culinary school, but dropped out shortly after because she was gaining good culinary experience at her job.

== Career ==
Nguyen began her career working at the New Orleans bakery Sucré and later Coquette. She then moved to New York City and worked at the Michelin star restaurant Eleven Madison Park for two years. She next worked at the startup The Dinner Lab, and helped open a fledgling cooking school called Cook Space, a cooking school in Brooklyn, where she created and led culinary programs.

=== Television ===
Nguyen gained wider prominence as a contestant on season 16 of Top Chef. Although she was eliminated early in the competition, she was invited to appear on the next season, Top Chef: All-Stars L.A. The season premiered shortly after the onset of the COVID-19 pandemic. Nguyen began teaching virtual cooking classes at that time.

In 2022, Nguyen hosted Focus Features' Downton Kitchen, a cooking series inspired by Downton Abbey. In 2024, she made her Food Network debut on season five of Tournament of Champions, where she entered the main bracket after winning the qualifying round. Later that year Nguyen was a contestant on the cooking competition show Last Bite Hotel. She won first place.

=== Cookbook ===
In August 2024, she released her first book Đặc Biệt: An Extra-Special Vietnamese Cookbook. Of the title, Nguyen said "to be dac biet is to elevate or make more distinguished...In Vietnamese-American slang, it's like you're being extra, you're being dac biet. From the way I dress to the way I cook to just my personality, I feel like I am dac biet." In a starred review, Sarah Tansley wrote in the Library Journal, "Nguyen’s delicious efforts to bring her unique cuisine and personal style to print will be a hit with fans and newbies alike."

== Works ==
- Dăc Biêt: An Extra-Special Vietnamese Cookbook. Nini Nguyen & Sarah Zorn. Knopf. 2024. ISBN 9780593535547
