= Chris Scott (chef) =

American chef and restaurateur

- Born: Coatesville, Pennsylvania
- Culinary career
- Cooking style: Amish soul food

Chris Scott is an American chef and restaurateur who specializes in Amish soul food, a style of soul food that incorporates elements of Pennsylvania Dutch cuisine.

== Early life and education ==
Scott's great-great-great-grandmother was enslaved in Virginia and freed by the Emancipation Proclamation. His great-grandparents moved to Coatesville, Pennsylvania from the tidewater region of Virginia during the Great Migration to work in the steel mills.

Scott was born in South Carolina but raised in Coatesville after his parents, who were divorcing, sent him to live with his grandmother, Pearl. His grandmother helped raise him and taught him to cook. According to Scott, she "always made an extra place setting for every meal, for the guest who may or may not arrive". The food he grew up eating included Appalachian dishes.

Scott has a degree in English literature.

== Career ==
In 2010 Scott and his wife, Eugenie Woo, opened a breakfast and brunch restaurant, Brooklyn Commune, in Brooklyn's Windsor Terrace neighborhood and lived upstairs. In 2017 the couple opened Butterfunk Kitchen in the space next door. They later rebranded Brooklyn Commune as Sumner's Luncheonette. Both closed in 2018. In 2019 they opened Birdman Juke Joint, paying homage to the chicken shacks of Southern cuisine such as Hattie B's and Prince's Hot Chicken, in Bridgeport, Connecticut. Scott operated a ghost kitchen in Soho, Butterfunk Biscuit, and later opened a bricks-and-mortar version in Harlem.

In 2018 he participated in the James Beard Foundation's first-ever Juneteenth celebration dinner, along with fellow Top Chef contestants Adrienne Cheatham, Tanya Holland, and Brother Luck. In 2019 he became an instructor at the Institute of Culinary Education.

Scott describes his cooking style as Amish soul food, a reference to his family's roots in Southern cuisine and his upbringing in an area that specializes in Pennsylvania Dutch cuisine. He describes Amish soul food as dishes created by Black families who moved to Pennsylvania's Amish country and incorporated ingredients from Amish cuisine into their family recipes, especially sweet and sour flavors. According to Scott, a dish of scrapple served with okra chow-chow could be the "poster child" of Amish soul food, as okra is integral to Southern cuisine and agriculture, scrapple is a typical Pennsylvania Dutch dish, and chow-chow, which has West African roots, is found in both cuisines. Scott has said that early in his career, while studying the techniques of French cuisine, he had been "embarrassed" to cook soul food and Southern food because it was ridiculed in fine dining restaurants and only prepared for staff meals, but as he matured and became more confident in his culinary approach, he embraced both as legitimate cuisines.

== Television ==
In 2018 Scott competed on season 15 of American cooking competition show Top Chef, where he was eliminated in the finals.

== Books ==
- Scott, Chris; Zorn, Sarah (2022). Homage : recipes and stories from an Amish soul food kitchen. Chronicle Books. ISBN 9781797207742.

== Personal life ==
Scott is married to Eugenie Woo. The couple has four daughters. He is a recovering alcoholic and has been sober since 2014. He is a fan of the Philadelphia Eagles.
