= Darnell Ferguson =

American celebrity chef (born 1987)

- Born: 1987 (age 38–39); Philadelphia, Pennsylvania, U.S.
- Education: Sullivan University
- Culinary career
- Current restaurant(s): Superhero Chefs, Tuscumbia, Alabama
- Previous restaurant(s): Super Chefs, Louisville, Kentucky Tha Drippin Crab, Louisville, Kentucky Stadium, Gahanna, Ohio
- Television show(s): Worst Cooks in America Tournament of Champions

Darnell Ferguson is an American chef, television personality and restaurateur.

== Early life and education ==
Darnell Ferguson was born in 1987 in Philadelphia, Pennsylvania. He grew up in Columbus, Ohio. In high school, Ferguson was inspired by Emeril Lagasse's television cooking series, Emeril Live, and spent a year of high school enrolled in vocational cooking school. He attended Sullivan University in Louisville, Kentucky. Ferguson was selected with a group of 20 student chefs who cooked for Team USA in the 2008 Summer Olympics in Beijing, China.

== Career ==
Ferguson is the former owner of restaurants Super Chefs, and Tha Drippin Crab in the Russell neighborhood of Louisville, Kentucky.

Ferguson's television career began in 2015, after an appearance first on the local news and later on The Rachel Ray Show where he talked about his journey from selling drugs to owning restaurants. During The Rachel Ray Show television appearance Ferguson met his hero, Emeril Lagasse.

He is the co-host alongside chef Anne Burrell of Food Network's Worst Cooks in America (season 25). He has also appeared on HGTV's Home Town Takeover, The Big Holiday Food Fight, as well as the Food Network's Chopped, Supermarket Stakeout, Tiny Food Fight, Guy's Grocery Games, and Tournament of Champions.

== Personal life ==
Ferguson was jailed for selling drugs six times. During his last visit to jail prior to 2024, Ferguson vowed to never return again and joined a church. He was evicted and lived in his car for sometime, before starting a pop-up restaurant in Louisville in 2012.

Ferguson is married to Tatahda Ferguson, with whom he has children.

On January 9, 2024, Ferguson was arrested by Louisville Metro Police in the Louisville suburb of St. Matthews on seven criminal charges, including burglary, strangulation, and other charges in an incident involving his then-estranged wife. He appeared in court on January 10, where he pled not guilty and had his bond set at $10,000. His preliminary court hearing was also scheduled for January 18, 2024, and a jury trial was set for February 25, 2025 but was continued to May 13, 2025. Ferguson agreed to a plea deal that he would serve no jail time if he stayed out of trouble for two years and paid a $250 fine. His wife stated, "I reacted in the heat of the moment after we had an intense argument, and called the police for a matter that really didn't warrant their involvement."
