= Lee Anne Wong =

American chef and restaurateur

- Born: New York City, New York, U.S.
- Education: Fashion Institute of Technology, French Culinary Institute
- Known for: Chef, culinary producer, television host, restaurateur
- Culinary career
- Current restaurant(s): * Koko Head Cafe, Honolulu, Hawaii
- Previous restaurant(s): * Sweetcatch Poke, New York City, New York
- Television shows: * Top Chef: San Francisco, * Top Chef: Colorado, * Top Chef: All-Stars L.A. * Unique Eats

Lee Anne Wong is an American chef, restaurateur, a television culinary producer, and television figure. She has appeared as a competitor on reality television cooking competitions for 20 years, starred on the 2006 first season of Bravo's reality show, Top Chef, and was named the winner of 24 in 24: Last Chef Standing (and $100,000) in 2026. Wong was based in New York City, before moving to Hawaii in 2013. She has also worked extensively as a culinary producer for American television series, including for four seasons of Top Chef.

== Early life and education ==
Lee Anne Wong grew up in Wynantskill, New York, a small town in Rensselaer County outside Albany.

She began her college education at the Fashion Institute of Technology, where she studied fashion design, but later transferred to the professional cooking program at The French Culinary Institute (now the International Culinary Center).

== Career ==
Later she became the Executive Chef of Event Operations at The French Culinary Institute, a position she maintained while participating in the Top Chef competitions.

From 2010 until 2013, she has also been seen on the Cooking Channel's Unique Eats as a commentator. She was also the chef consultant for the 2007 American remake of the German film, Mostly Martha, called No Reservations.

Wong participated in a tasting benefit event produced by New York Loves Japan and Project by Project to fundraise for the 2011 Japan earthquake aid relief. In 2011, Wong appeared on Iron Chef America (season 10, episode 1), with Halloween candy being the secret ingredient; chef Wong successfully challenged Iron Chef Marc Forgione with a resulting score of 52–51.

Wong moved to Honolulu, Hawaiʻi, in 2013, followed by a brief move to Maui. In 2014, she opened and continued to run Koko Head Cafe, a popular brunch spot. Wong also joined the Hawaiian Airlines culinary team in 2015 and became executive chef in 2018.

She was one of the last four contestants on the 2006 first season of Bravo's reality show, Top Chef. She was the culinary producer for the next four seasons of Top Chef, where her duties included sourcing and styling the ingredients for the various challenges, as well as determining the budget, equipment restrictions and time limits. She also blogged about the show for Bravo, and hosted the webcast Top Recipe: The Wong Way to Cook, in which she demonstrated how to prepare various winning dishes invented by the program contestants.

In 2018, Wong competed on Top Chef: Colorado, winning a spot on the season proper through its Last Chance Kitchen feature. She withdrew during her second week of the competition due to altitude sickness combined with her pregnancy. In 2020, Wong competed on Top Chef: All-Stars L.A. and made it to Episode 9 before being eliminated.

In 2023, Wong's restaurant Papa’aina at Lāhainā's Pioneer Inn was destroyed during a major wildfire. She and other volunteers proceeded to work with World Central Kitchen to help in the relief effort for affected Maui residents. In May 2026, Chef Wong defeated 23 other chefs in the Food Network's 24 in 24: Last Chef Standing, a 24-hour cooking competition.

== Filmography ==
- 2006, Top Chef: San Francisco, as self and contestant
- 2010–2013, Unique Eats, as self and host
- 2011, Iron Chef America: The Series, as self and contestant, in "Forgione vs. Wong: Halloween Candy" (season 10, episode 16)
- 2012–2015, Chopped, as self and judge
- 2017, Top Chef: Colorado, as self and contestant
- 2020, Top Chef: All-Stars L.A., as self and contestant
- 2023, Tournament of Champions, as self and contestant
- 2024, Tournament of Champions, as self and contestant
