= Top Chef: Colorado =

Season 15 of American television series

- Season 15
- Hosted by: Padma Lakshmi
- Judges: Tom Colicchio; Gail Simmons; Graham Elliot
- No. of contestants: 19
- Winner: Joe Flamm
- Runner-up: Adrienne Cheatham
- Location: Denver, Boulder, and Telluride, Colorado
- Finals venue: Aspen, Colorado
- Fan Favorite: Fatima Ali
- No. of episodes: 14

Release
- Original network: Bravo
- Original release: December 7, 2017 – March 8, 2018

Season chronology
- ← Previous; Charleston Next → Kentucky

Top Chef: Colorado is the fifteenth season of the American reality television series Top Chef. The season's details and cast were revealed on October 12, 2017. The show was filmed in various cities across Colorado, including Denver, Boulder, Telluride, and Aspen. The season premiered on December 7, 2017, and concluded on March 8, 2018. Last Chance Kitchen premiered on November 30, 2017. In the season finale, Joe Flamm was declared the winner over runner-up Adrienne Cheatham. Fatima Ali was voted Fan Favorite.

== Contestants ==
Fifteen chefs competed in Top Chef: Colorado. In addition, four returning competitors from previous seasons competed in the Last Chance Kitchen for the opportunity to enter the main competition: Top Chef: San Francisco contestant Lee Anne Wong, Top Chef: Los Angeles runner-up and All-Stars contestant Marcel Vigneron, Top Chef: California contestant Kwame Onwuachi, and Top Chef: Las Vegas finalist and All-Stars contestant Jennifer Carroll. Following the sixth episode of Last Chance Kitchen, Wong was selected to join the main cast. Claudette Zepeda-Wilkins previously appeared as a contestant on the second season of Top Chef México.

=== New contestants ===
Name	Current Residence (Note: The contestants' city and state of residence during time of filming.)
Fatima Ali	New York, New York
Tyler Anderson	Simsbury, Connecticut
Carrie Baird	Denver, Colorado
Adrienne Cheatham	New York, New York
Laura Cole	Denali National Park, Alaska
Joe Flamm	Chicago, Illinois
Rogelio Garcia	San Francisco, California
Tanya Holland	Oakland, California
Bruce Kalman	Los Angeles, California
Brother Luck	Colorado Springs, Colorado
Melissa Perfit	San Francisco, California
Tu David Phu	Oakland, California
Joe Sasto	Los Angeles, California
Chris Scott	Brooklyn, New York
Claudette Zepeda-Wilkins	San Diego, California

Carrie Baird and Brother Luck returned for Top Chef: Kentucky, competing in the Last Chance Kitchen. Joe Sasto returned for Top Chef: All-Stars L.A.

=== Returning contestants ===
Name	Current Residence	Season(s)
Jennifer Carroll	Washington, D.C.	Season 6, 8
Kwame Onwuachi	Washington, D.C.	Season 13
Marcel Vigneron	Los Angeles, California	Season 2, 8
Lee Anne Wong	Honolulu, Hawaii	Season 1

== Contestant progress ==
Episode #		1	2	3	4	5	6	7	8	9	10	11	12	13	14
Quickfire Challenge Winner(s)		Tu	Joe F.	Brother	Adrienne	N/A	Chris	Carrie	N/A	Carrie^{1}	Chris^{1}	Carrie^{1}	Joe S.^{1}	Joe F.^{1}	N/A
Contestant		Elimination Challenge Results													
1	Joe F.	IN	IN	IN	LOW	IN	IN	HIGH	WIN	OUT^{5}		HIGH^{6}	IN	WIN	WINNER
2	Adrienne	LOW	LOW	LOW	IN	IN	LOW	IN	HIGH	LOW	HIGH	HIGH	WIN	LOW	RUNNER-UP
3	Joe S.	IN	IN	WIN	HIGH	IN	LOW	WIN	LOW	LOW	WIN	WIN	IN	OUT	
4	Carrie	LOW	WIN	IN	IN	HIGH	IN	IN	HIGH	WIN	HIGH	LOW	OUT		
5	Chris	HIGH	HIGH	LOW	WIN	LOW	IN	LOW	LOW	WIN	LOW	OUT			
6	Bruce	IN	IN	LOW	LOW	WIN	HIGH	HIGH	HIGH	LOW	OUT				
7	Fatima	HIGH	HIGH	HIGH	IN	IN	IN	IN	LOW	OUT					
8	Claudette	IN	OUT			IN^{3}	HIGH	LOW	OUT						
9	Tanya	IN	HIGH	IN	HIGH	LOW	WIN	OUT							
10	Brother	IN	IN	LOW	IN	IN	OUT								
11	Lee Anne					HIGH^{3}	WDR^{4}								
12	Tu	IN	IN	LOW	IN	OUT									
13	Tyler	WIN	LOW	HIGH	OUT										
14	Rogelio	IN	LOW	OUT											
15	Laura	IN	HIGH	OUT^{2}											
16	Melissa	OUT													

^Note 1: The chef(s) did not receive immunity for winning the Quickfire Challenge.
^Note 2: Laura placed last in the Quickfire Challenge and was eliminated.
^Note 3: Following Episode 6 of Last Chance Kitchen, Claudette rejoined the competition and Lee Anne was introduced as a regular competitor.
^Note 4: Due to severe altitude sickness and concerns over her unborn baby's health, Lee Anne elected to withdraw from the competition.
^Note 5: Joe F. Placed last in the Quickfire Challenge and was eliminated.
^Note 6: Joe F. won Last Chance Kitchen and returned to the competition.

(WINNER) The chef won the season and was crowned "Top Chef."
(RUNNER-UP) The chef was the runner-up for the season.
(WIN) The chef won the Elimination Challenge.
(HIGH) The chef was selected as one of the top entries in the Elimination Challenge but did not win.
(IN) The chef was not selected as one of the top or bottom entries in the Elimination Challenge and was safe.
(LOW) The chef was selected as one of the bottom entries in the Elimination Challenge but was not eliminated.
(OUT) The chef lost the Elimination Challenge.
(WDR) The chef voluntarily withdrew from the competition.

== Episodes ==
No. overall	No. in season	Title	Original release date	US viewers (millions)
218	1	"It'll Take More than Pot Luck"	December 7, 2017	0.88
Quickfire Challenge: To introduce themselves to the judges and their fellow competitors, the chefs had to create a dish for a potluck. The contestants then voted for their most and least favorite dishes. The winner received immunity from elimination.: Winner: Tu (Corn Salpicon); Elimination Challenge: The chefs were tasked with putting a modern spin on a meat and potatoes dish. The dishes were served to 200 Denver locals at a block party located in Larimer Square.: Winner: Tyler (Sweet Potato Purée with Crispy Potatoes & Smoked Pork Gravy); Eliminated: Melissa (Yukon Potato Purée with Braised Pork Shoulder & Fennel Salad)
219	2	"Smile and Say Mise"	December 14, 2017	0.78
Quickfire Challenge: Divided into two teams, the chefs competed in the series' traditional mise en place relay race. The race consisted of three tasks: peel and brunoise shallots; peel, destem, and slice mushrooms; and butcher twenty pieces of beef tenderloin. The winning team members then competed against each other, cooking dishes using the three prepped ingredients. The winner received immunity from elimination, US$5,000, and a year's supply of Blue Apron dinners. The guest judge for the challenge was chef Troy Guard.: Winner: Joe F. (Shallot, Mushroom & Ginger-Marinated Tenderloin with Peppers); Elimination Challenge: The chefs, remaining in the same teams from the Quickfire Challenge, were required to prepare a four-course meal that incorporated four different kinds of cheese. The guest judge for the challenge was chef Alex Seidel.: Winner: Carrie (Potato & Ricotta Dumpling with Butter Sauce & Hazelnut Relish); Eliminated: Claudette (Smoked Trout with Cacio Pecora, Trout Skin Chips & Zucchini)
220	3	"Keep on Truckin"	December 21, 2017	0.81
Sudden Death Quickfire Challenge: The chefs deconstructed the Denver omelette. The winner received immunity from elimination. The guest judge for the challenge was chef Lachlan Mackinnon-Patterson.: Winner: Brother (Smoked Duck Egg with Red Pepper Gastrique, Cheddar & Ham Tempura & Pepper Salad); Sudden Death Cook-off: Laura, Rogelio, and Tanya, who made the judges' least favorite dishes, competed against each other in a sudden death cook-off, where they had to make the perfect French omelette. The loser was immediately eliminated from the competition.; Eliminated: Laura (Mascarpone & Tarragon Omelette); Elimination Challenge: The chefs, separated into teams of three, had to create a food truck concept with a cohesive three-item menu, which would be served to 150 college students. Each diner was provided a ticket to exchange at one food truck; the team who received the most tickets was safe from elimination. The guest judge for the challenge was Top Chef: New York winner Hosea Rosenberg.: Winner: Joe S. ("Sticky Licky" Chicken Wings with Sake & Kale); Eliminated: Rogelio ("Nibble On Your Ear" Elote Salad with Queso Fresco & Pepitas)
221	4	"Little Tools, Big Challenge"	December 28, 2017	0.99
Quickfire Challenge: The chefs elevated items from a traditional kids' menu; they were also limited to using kids-sized kitchen equipment. The winner received immunity from elimination. The guest judge for the challenge was chef Curtis Stone.: Winner: Adrienne (Cauliflower Crust Pizza with Ricotta Spread, Tomato Compote & Fried Quail Egg); Elimination Challenge: The chefs created dishes inspired by their heritage and backgrounds. The guest judge for the challenge was Food & Wine contributor Nilou Motamed.: Winner: Chris (Lemonade-Fried Chicken with Collard Greens, Buttermilk Biscuits & Hot Sauce); Eliminated: Tyler (Spiced Tri-Tip with Swedish Potato Pancake, Swedish Meatballs & Pico de Gallo)
222	5	"This Is Not Glamping"	January 4, 2018	0.96
Elimination Challenge: While camping outside near the mountains of Estes Park, the chefs had to create a meal using only camping equipment and ingredients native to Colorado. The guest judge for the challenge was chef Naomi Pomeroy. Prior to the challenge, Claudette and Lee Anne were selected by head judge Colicchio to join the main competition, following their wins in Episode 6 of Last Chance Kitchen.: Winner: Bruce (Egg Yolk Cavatelli, Wild Boar Sugo, Roasted Ramps, Carrots & Fresh Ricotta); Eliminated: Tu (Rabbit Three Ways: Soy-Poached Hind Leg with Carrot Duxelles, Loin Medallions, Fried Foreleg with Szechuan Gastrique)
223	6	"Now That's a Lot of Schnitzel"	January 11, 2018	0.85
Quickfire Challenge: The chefs had to cook one of the most complicated dishes from their restaurants' menus in only 30 minutes. The winner received immunity from elimination and had their recipe featured in a BuzzFeed Tasty video. The guest judge for the challenge was Top Chef: All-Stars winner Richard Blais.: Winner: Chris (Pepper Pot Shrimp with Jerk Spice, Peppers & Onions); Elimination Challenge: The chefs were responsible for elevating traditional German cuisine. In addition, each contestant had to create their own original radler to pair with their dish. The guest judge for the challenge was chef Keegan Gerhard.: Winner: Tanya (Peach & Ginger Radler with Pork Apple Croquettes in Cheddar Mustard Sauce); Eliminated: Brother (Chai Tea Radler with Summer Sausage Egg Roll, Bok Choy, Apple & Potato); Withdrew: Lee Anne (Note: Due to severe altitude sickness and concerns over her unborn baby's health, Lee Anne elected to withdraw from the competition.)
224	7	"Olympic Dreams"	January 18, 2018	0.86
Quickfire Challenge: The chefs made breakfast dishes featuring Nutella. The winner received immunity from elimination and US$5,000. The guest judge for the challenge was Top Chef: Charleston winner Brooke Williamson.: Winner: Carrie (Eggs Benedict with Nutella, Strawberry Habanero Jam & Hollandaise); Elimination Challenge: The chefs participated in a team challenge inspired by the 2018 Winter Olympics. In teams of three, the contestants competed head-to-head in three rounds showcasing speed, precision, and creativity. The dishes were served in the Top Chef kitchen, which was converted into an arena setting, to 70 diners, including Olympians Meryl Davis, Gus Kenworthy, and John Daly. In the speed round, the chefs had to feed 30 diners in 45 minutes. In the precision round, the chefs had to cook a protein to the perfect temperature and compose their dish using three knife-cut techniques: chiffonade, bâtonnet, and brunoise. The chefs had to produce the most creative dish possible in the creativity round using a mystery protein. The team with the lowest combined score after all three rounds faced elimination. The guest judge for the challenge was originally chef John Besh. However, following numerous sexual harassment allegations against him in late 2017, Bravo made the decision to edit Besh out of the episode.: Winner: Joe S. (Beef Short Rib Casoncelli with Carrots & Ramps); Eliminated: Tanya (North African Leg of Lamb with Chiffonade Collard Greens, Couscous, Shallot Brunoise, Glazed Carrot & Zucchini Bâtonnet)
225	8	"Restaurant Wars"	January 25, 2018	0.81
Elimination Challenge: The chefs competed in Top Chef's traditional Restaurant Wars challenge. The contestants, split into two teams, were responsible for transforming an empty space into a fully functioning pop-up restaurant within 24 hours. As usual, the teams were required to cook three-course meals; however, instead of two options, they had to create three options per course, resulting in nine total dishes. To help with the increased workload, each team was allowed to select one sous chef from the pool of previously eliminated chefs. The winning team received US$40,000. The guest judges for the challenge were chefs, Bruce Bromberg and Eric Bromberg.: Conifer: Adrienne, Bruce, Carrie, Joe F.; First Course: Hiramasa Crudo, Diced Cucumber, Pickled Green Almond & Neonata Oil (Joe F.); Local Kale Salad with Beets Three Ways: Raisined, Roasted & Pickled (Carrie); Braised Pork Meatball with Polenta, Amatriciana Sauce, Parmigiano Reggiano & House Giardiniera (Bruce); Second Course: Roasted Duck Breast, Corn Purée, Roasted Apricots & Duck Jus (Joe F.); Red Pepper Orecchiette with Lamb Sausage, Fava Beans, Pea & Fava Shoots (Bruce); Colorado Sea Bass, Wheat Berries, Port Reduction, Chive Oil & Pickled Cauliflower (Adrienne); Third Course: Apple Upside-Down Cake, Apricot, Apple Butter Bourbon Glaze (Bruce); Lemon Curd, Sugar Cookie, Mint Gelée (Carrie); Caramelized White Chocolate Buttermilk Cake with Crème Fraîche Ice Cream (Adrienne); Common Place: Chris, Claudette, Fatima, Joe S.; First Course: Top Round Tartare, Three Pepper Aoili & Sweet Potato Chips (Fatima); Shigoku Oysters with Spring Pea Foam & Kombucha Pickled Rhubarb (Joe S.); Chicken Purse with Charred Spring Onion in Chicken Broth (Joe S.); Second Course: Bone Marrow with Blue Prawns, Avocado Purée, Tomatillos, Chili Peppers & Peanuts (Claudette); Ricotta Dumplings with Mushrooms, Charred Broccoli & Broccoli Flowers (Joe S.); Braised Pork Shoulder & Cheek with Amaranth, Quinoa, Millet Grain Cake & Horseradish Cream (Chris); Third Course: Beet Donut, Chocolate Cream Ganache, Beet Fennel Chutney (Chris); Sundae, Financier, Berry Sauce, Smoked & Toasted Almonds (Claudette); Skyr with Miso Chickpeas, White Chocolate Caramelized Crumble & Pickled Cherries (Claudette); Winning Team: Conifer; Winner: Joe F.; Eliminated: Claudette
226	9	"Bronco Brouhaha"	February 1, 2018	0.88
Sudden Death Quickfire Challenge: The chefs incorporated edible flowers into their dishes. Beginning with this challenge, immunity from elimination was no longer awarded to the winner. The guest judge for the challenge was chef David Kinch.: Winner: Carrie ("Fancy Toast": Lavender, Fig & Goat Cheese Toast with Candied Pecans); Sudden Death Cook-off: Chris, Joe F., and Joe S., who made the judges' least favorite dishes, competed against each other in a sudden death cook-off. Their dishes were required to substitute one ingredient with cauliflower. The loser was immediately eliminated from the competition.; Eliminated: Joe F. (Purple Cauliflower Risotto with Caramelized Cauliflower Purée & Pickled Romanesco Broccoli); Elimination Challenge: Working in teams of two, the chefs had to create one plate of food for a tailgate Super Bowl party at Sports Authority Field at Mile High. The winners each received a trip for two to Super Bowl LII. The guest judge for the challenge was chef Adam Perry Lang.: Winners: Carrie, Chris (Pork Green Chili Poutine with Stadium Fries); Eliminated: Fatima ("Blue & Orange" Nachos with Achiote Rubbed Chicken, Black Lentils, Cheese Sauce & Peach Habanero Salsa)
227	10	"Red Rum and Then Some"	February 8, 2018	0.80
Quickfire Challenge: The chefs traveled to The Stanley Hotel, where they crafted desserts visualizing their worst nightmares.: Winner: Chris ("Pushed From 12,000 Feet": Chocolate Buttermilk Cake with Sour Cream, Black Salt & Marzipan); Elimination Challenge: The chefs were tasked with creating dishes that embodied their culinary journeys on Top Chef. The dishes were served at the Colorado Governor's Mansion to a table of guests, including Governor of Colorado John Hickenlooper. The guest judge for the challenge was chef Frank Bonanno.: Winner: Joe S. (Lamb Agnolotti with Beets, Hazelnuts & Cacio Pecora Cheese); Eliminated: Bruce (Roasted Duck with Toasted Barley & Corn, Topped with Salsify)
228	11	"Cooking High"	February 15, 2018	0.84
Quickfire Challenge: The chefs served gastropub-inspired dishes featuring sarsaparilla. The guest judge for the challenge was chef Wylie Dufresne.: Winner: Carrie ("Top of the French Onion Soup" with Sarsaparilla-Deglazed Onions & Beef Stock); Elimination Challenge: The chefs had to create high concept dishes under high-altitude cooking conditions. The dishes were served at Alpino Vino, the highest elevation restaurant in North America, which sits at approximately 12,000 feet (3.7 km) above sea level. Each chef was also required to include a baking element in their dish. The guest judges for the challenge were chefs Wylie Dufresne and Paul Liebrandt.: Winner: Joe S. (Roasted Duck with Spring Peas, Cherry Jam & Kombucha Cherry Puffs); Eliminated: Chris (Crispy Black Pepper Quail with Corn Pudding, Butternut Squash, Maple & Bacon Cornbread)
229	12	"Sunday Supper"	February 22, 2018	0.74
Quickfire Challenge: The chefs had to create a dish with Rocky Mountain oysters prepared two ways. The guest judges for the challenge were Top Chef: Las Vegas winner Michael Voltaggio and his brother Bryan Voltaggio. The winner received an advantage in the following Elimination Challenge.: Winner: Joe S. (Cornflake-Breaded Rocky Mountain Oysters, White Bean Purée & Brown Butter Braised Rocky Mountain Oysters); Elimination Challenge: The chefs were greeted by their family members at a surprise reunion. After enjoying a meal served by the contestants' families, the chefs were instructed to take the dish cooked by their relatives and elevate it to the next level. As the winner of the Quickfire Challenge, Joe S. received an extra 30 minutes of prep time.: Winner: Adrienne ("Mom's Gumbo" Butter-Poached King Crab Leg & Shrimp with Trinity, Fried Andouille Chips & Rice); Eliminated: Carrie (Beef Stroganoff Raviolo with Buffalo Sausage, Mushroom Duxelle, Herbed Crème Fraîche & Caramelized Onions)
230	13	"A Little Place Called Aspen"	March 1, 2018	0.77
Quick Fire Challenge: The chefs had to go fly fishing, catch a trout, and cook a dish within the allotted time frame. The guest judge for the challenge was Top Chef Masters Season 4 winner Chris Cosentino. The winner received an advantage in the following Elimination Challenge.: Winner: Joe F. (Pan-Seared Trout, Black Garlic Beurre Blanc with Fennel, Mushrooms, Asparagus & Bread Crumbs); Elimination Challenge: The chefs served vegetarian dishes to various chefs and food connoisseurs attending the Food & Wine Classic in Aspen, including Brooke Williamson, Danny Meyer, Bryan Voltaggio, Michael Voltaggio, Ludo Lefebvre, Scott Conant, and Tim Love. To help with the challenge, each contestant received the assistance of one of the three most recently eliminated competitors: Carrie, Chris, and Bruce. As the winner of the Quickfire Challenge, Joseph was able to select his own sous chef and assign his opponents'. He selected Carrie for himself, Bruce for Adrienne, and Chris for Joe S. . The guest judge for the challenge was chef Daniel Boulud.: Winner: Joe F. (Grilled Baby Zucchini Topped with Hazelnut Zucchini Pesto, Mushroom Vinaigrette, Goat Cheese & Raw Asparagus Salad); Eliminated: Joe S. (Beet Carpaccio with Beet Yogurt, Green Bean Tomato Vinaigrette & Sourdough Bread)
231	14	"Finale"	March 8, 2018	0.93
Elimination Challenge: The finalists had to create the best four-course progressive meal of their lives. Each finalist received help from two sous chefs, consisting of previously eliminated contestants. Adrienne was assisted by Chris and Carrie, while Joe F. was assisted by Joe S. and Fatima. The guest judges for the challenge were Jonathan Waxman, Nancy Silverton, and Curtis Duffy.: Adrienne: First Course: Spoon Bread, Sea Urchin, Buttermilk Dashi, Ham, Caviar & Wheat Tuile; Second Course: Blackened Octopus with Squid Ink Grits & Fennel Chow-Chow; Third Course: Cheerwine-Braised Short Rib, Black Eyed Peas with Ham Hock & Cheerwine Bone Marrow Bordelaise; Fourth Course: Banana Pudding with Yuzu, Banana Spears & Vanilla Wafers; Joe F.: First Course: "Tonno Vitellato" - Raw Tuna with Veal Demi Aioli, Smoked Wagyu Powder & Capers; Second Course: "Tortellini En Brodo" - Grano Arso Tortellini, Pig Head, Apple, Black Truffle & Braising Liquid Broth; Third Course: "Manzo Di Colorado" - Roasted Beef Ribeye with Roasted Asparagus & Smoked Bone Marrow Sauce; Fourth Course: "Torta Della Nonna" - Brown Sugar Cake, Whipped Ricotta, Blueberry Thyme Sauce & Chocolate Shards; Winner: Joe F.; Runner-up: Adrienne

== Last Chance Kitchen ==
No.	Title	Original air date
1	"Catch Me Up...Quick!"	November 30, 2017
Challenge: The four returning Top Chef contestants had to create a dish that represented their current ventures as a chef. In addition, the contestants had to agree upon five ingredients that they would all have to incorporate into their dishes; they chose cauliflower, lamb, serrano peppers, fennel, and olives. Only three contestants would move on to compete against the first eliminated chef from the main cast.: Jennifer: Lamb Croquettes, Crème Fraîche with Gochujang & Lemon Zest; Kwame: Moroccan Lamb Stew, Castelvetrano Olives, Cashews, Fennel; Lee Anne: Cauliflower Soup, Ground Lamb & Flatbread; Marcel: Vadouvan Lamb Rack, Olive, Pine Nuts, Fennel Fronds, Fennel Pollen & Roasted Cauliflower; Winner: Lee Anne; Eliminated: Jennifer
2	"All of a Spudden"	December 7, 2017
Challenge: The chefs had to create a dish featuring potatoes.: Kwame: Potato Écrasé, Potato Crumble, Lemon, Smoked Paprika, Crispy Pancetta; Lee Anne: Herb, Kale & Potato Purée, Crispy Potato Batonnet, Potato Ring, Seared Scallop & Andouille Sausage; Marcel: French Fry Potato with Aji Amarillo Sauce; Melissa: Pan-Seared Salmon, Confit Fingerling Potatoes, Yukon Gold Potato Chips, Chive Oil with Lemon; Winner: Marcel; Eliminated: Melissa
3	"Miss Muffet's Favorite"	December 14, 2017
Challenge: Inspired by the Little Miss Muffet nursery rhyme, the chefs had to create a dish using cheese curds, whey, and dried zebra tarantulas.: Kwame: Grilled Flatbread with Whey Sauce & Cheese Curds, Crispy Tarantula; Lee Anne: Crispy Tarantula over "Grime Time" of Fried Curds & Piquillo Pepper Compote, Whey Honey Vinaigrette; Marcel: Fresh Mozzarella, Heirloom Tomato, Whey Emulsion, Prosciutto, Tarantula Gremolata; Claudette: Ha Sikil Pak, Fried Sweet Potato Skins & Tarantula; Winner: Claudette; Eliminated: Marcel
4	"Two Wrongs"	December 21, 2017
Challenge: The chefs were shown seven baskets filled with unusual pairings of ingredients: vanilla beans and pickles, strawberries and garlic, liquorice and peanut butter, sour candy and gochujang, bonito flakes and chocolate, bananas and capers, and coffee and anchovy paste. Each contestant had to select one basket and create a cohesive dish using their ingredients, attempting to turn "two wrongs into a right". Following the judging, two chefs were eliminated.: Kwame (Bananas & Capers): Nigerian Red Pepper Chicken Stew, Plantain Chips, Pickled Pepper & Crispy Capers; Lee Anne (Vanilla & Pickles): Veracruz Chicken with Dried Chiles, Vanilla, Orange & Grapefruit Juice, Cucumber Salsa; Claudette (Bonito Flakes & Chocolate): Seared Venison with Raspberry Mole; Laura (Strawberries & Garlic): Black Garlic Roasted Halibut with Strawberry, Heirloom Tomato & Garlic Salsa; Rogelio (Sour Candy & Gochujang): Sour Candy-Marinated Tuna, Fennel, Apple, Pepper & Red Onion Escabeche; Winner: Claudette; Eliminated: Laura, Rogelio
5	"All in Your Head"	December 28, 2017
Challenge (Part 1): In the first round of a two-part challenge, the chefs had to create dishes using animal heads.: Kwame: Traditional Thai Curry with Salmon, Garlic Chips & Flat Bread; Lee Anne: Braised & Fried Halibut Cheek, Sautéed Vegetables, Lamb & Black Bean Sauce; Claudette: Taco de Lengua - Pork Tongue Taco with Mushrooms, Cabbage Slaw, Salsa Verde; Tyler: Pork Cheek Braised in Brown Butter Currant Sauce, Sweet Potato Purée, Spaghetti Squash; Winner: Kwame; Eliminated: Tyler
6	"Cook with Your Guts"	December 28, 2017
Challenge (Part 2): In the second round of a two-part challenge, the chefs had to create dishes using the innards of various animals. The winners of the challenge earned spots in the main competition.: Kwame: Chicken Heart Sofrito with Crispy Shallots, Confit Potatoes, Potato Tostones & Chicken Gremolata; Lee Anne: Beef Liver Dumplings with Garlic, Shallots, Shoyu, Ginger & Chili Oil; Claudette: Picadillo Tetela with Chicken Livers & Cherries, Chintextle (Oaxacan Mother Sauce); Winners: Claudette, Lee Anne; Eliminated: Kwame
7	"Make Like a Tree and Leaf"	January 11, 2018
Challenge: The chefs made dishes highlighting the flavors and textures of the unconventionally eaten parts of the tree, such as spruce tips, pine tips, curry leaves, and kaffir lime leaves.: Brother: Pork Chop with Avocado Leaf Ash & Guajillo Chilis, Lime & Jalapeño Syrup, Charred Pineapple & Mango; Tu: Chicken Curry, Curry Leaves, Bay Leaves & Kaffir Lime Leaves; Winner: Brother; Eliminated: Tu
8	"Speed Round"	January 18, 2018
Challenge: The chefs were allowed to cook any dish, but were only given ten minutes to do so.: Brother: Seared Trout, Chorizo Vinaigrette & Cauliflower Purée; Tanya: Blackened Salmon with Romesco Sauce; Winner: Brother; Eliminated: Tanya
9	"Last Last Chance"	January 25, 2018
Challenge: The chefs had to create dishes using produce that has gone bad; they were also restricted from using any proteins.: Brother: Grilled Artichoke, Charred Eggplant Purée, Miso, Nutmeg, Morels, Confit of Tomatoes & Chive; Claudette: Plantain Molotes, Heirloom Tomato Caldillo, Cabbage Avocado Slaw with Crema; Winner: Brother; Eliminated: Claudette
10	"Ultimate Top Chef Taco Bar"	February 1, 2018
Challenge: The chefs put their own spin on tacos. Instead of creating the entire dish themselves, the chefs had to lay out the components for their tacos and allow Colicchio and the other eliminated contestants to build their own. In addition, at least one component had to incorporate Hidden Valley ranch seasoning.: Brother: Borracho Beans, Roasted Tomato Salsa, Grilled Carne Asada, Cotija Corn, Pickled Poblanos, Ranch Chipotle Crema; Fatima: Chana Masala, Poached Quail Eggs, Seven Spice New York Strip, Tamarind Chile Sauce, Ranch & Preserved Lemon Crème Fraîche, Avocado Coconut Crema; Joe F.: Ranch Tostadas, Ponzu & Cilantro Cod, Mirin Pickled Onions, Corn & Napa Kimchi, Ranch Yuzu Crema, Furikake Radishes, Gochujang Salsa; Winner: Joe F.; Eliminated: Fatima
11	"Goldilocks and the Three Bears"	February 8, 2018
Challenge: Inspired by the fairy tale "Goldilocks and the Three Bears", the chefs had to create a porridge dish.: Brother: White Quinoa Porridge, Seared Seabass, Cranberry Apple Chutney; Bruce: Farro & Barley Porridge, Seared Sea Scallop, Poached Egg, Pickled Mustard Green & Wild Mushroom; Joe F.: Seared Steak, Barley Porridge Milanese, Tomato Conserva, Parmigiano Reggiano; Winner: Brother; Eliminated: Bruce
12	"Finale"	February 8, 2018
Challenge: The finalists were allowed to cook any dish. The dishes were served to Colicchio, guest judge Lachlan Mackinnon-Patterson, and the gallery of previously eliminated chefs, who then voted for their favorite dish. The chef who received the most votes was declared the winner of Last Chance Kitchen and rejoined the main competition.: Brother: Stuffed Chicken Breast with Pecorino & Jalapeno, Roasted Chili Apple, Butternut Squash & Brussels Sprouts Hash, Lime Crema with Nitro Raspberries; Joe F.: Lamb Shoulder, Fava Bean Pesto, Charred Fava Pecorino, Shallot & Balsamic Glaze; Winner: Joe F.; Eliminated: Brother
