= Britt Rescigno =

American chef, restaurateur

Britt Rescigno is an American chef and restaurateur. She has appeared on many American televised cooking competitions.

== Early life and education ==
Brittany Rescigno was born and raised in the New Gretna section of Bass River Township, New Jersey, and grew up working at her grandparents' seafood restaurant, Allen's Clam Bar, which was next door to the family home and where her father was the chef. She additionally served as the head chef for Breeze’s Bar and Grill following her tenure at Allen’s. She was cooking on the line by the time she was 13. She graduated from Pinelands Regional High School. She graduated from The Culinary Institute of America in 2009 and externed at Wequassett Resort and Golf Club on Cape Cod.

== Career ==
Rescigno has worked as a consulting chef to help open restaurants. She was executive chef at Delaware Avenue Oyster House in Long Beach Island, New Jersey.

She was invited by fellow Tournament of Champions contestant Jonathon Sawyer to appear with him at a food and wine event in Sun Valley, Idaho. She and then-partner Kinsey Leodler were at the time researching a location for opening a restaurant together, and after several more visits opened Fiamma in Ketchum, Idaho.

== Television appearances ==
Rescigno has made multiple appearances in televised cooking competitions. In 2019 she won episodes of Chopped, Guy’s Grocery Games, and Beat Bobby Flay, in which she bested Flay by cooking her grandmother's chicken and dumplings. In 2022 she competed on Alex vs America. In 2023 she played in to an 8th seed on Tournament of Champions and became a semifinalist in what was described as a Cinderella story or underdog story; she was the first 8th seed ever to reach the semifinals. She also competed on Tournament of Champions in 2024, in which she made it to the final four, and in 2025, in which she was a #1 seed.

== Personal life ==
Rescigno married fellow chef Kinsey Leodler, whom she met while consulting to open a concept restaurant, in 2024. A previous marriage ended in 2020.
