= Joe Sasto =

American chef

- Born: Joseph Sasto III; U.S.
- Education: University of California, Davis (BA)
- Culinary career
- Previous restaurants: Branches Wood Fired Chop House, Ukiah, California, * RN74, San Francisco, California, * Cotogna, San Francisco, California, * Lazy Bear, San Francisco, California, * Cal Mare, Los Angeles, California (2018–2019)
- Television shows: Top Chef: Colorado, *Top Chef: All-Stars L.A., *Chopped

Joseph Sasto III is an American chef and television figure. He has appeared as a competitor on reality television cooking competitions, and he is a Top Chef television series alum. He also teaches cooking classes online. Sasto has a handlebar mustache, which inspired the nickname "Mustache Joe". Sasto has been based in San Francisco, Los Angeles, and Chicago.

== Biography ==
Sasto attended University of California, Davis (UC Davis) and graduated with a B.A. degree (2010) in communications.

After graduation he was a line cook in a newly opened restaurant in Ukiah, California. He moved to San Francisco to work for two years at RN74 under chef Jason Berthold, where he moved up to the role of sous-chef. Followed by three years working at Cotogna restaurant (and sometimes at sister restaurant Quince) in San Francisco, under chef Michael Tusk. Followed by a role as executive sous chef at Lazy Bear restaurant in San Francisco. In 2018, he worked as an executive chef at the former Cal Mare restaurant in Los Angeles. While working at Cal Mare, Sasto was one of the contestants on the American television series Top Chef: Colorado.

== Filmography ==
- 2018, Home & Family, as self
- 2016–2022, Chopped, as self both as contestant and as judge
- 2017, Top Chef: Colorado, as self
- 2020, Top Chef: All-Stars L.A., as self
- 2022–2023, Tournament of Champions, as self
- 2023, The Great Food Truck Race, as guest judge
- 2023, Outchef'd, as self
