= Cleveland Hustles =

2016 American TV series

- Genre: Reality show
- Presented by: Bonin Bough
- Starring: Kumar Arora; Kathy Futey; Alan Glazen; Jonathon Sawyer
- Narrated by: LeBron James
- Theme music composer: Robert ToTeras
- Country of origin: United States
- Original language: English
- No. of seasons: 1
- No. of episodes: 8

Production
- Executive producers: LeBron James; Maverick Carter
- Producers: Kathryn Vaughn; Jada Bates; Andrew Wallace; Mike Roth
- Production locations: Cleveland, Ohio
- Running time: 60 minutes inc. commercials
- Production companies: SpringHill Entertainment; Magical Elves

Original release
- Network: CNBC
- Release: August 24 – October 12, 2016

Cleveland Hustles is an hour-long American reality TV series created by LeBron James and Maverick Carter, which aired for an 8-episode season between August 24 and October 12, 2016, on CNBC. In it, aspiring entrepreneurs competed to open one of four physical stores in the Gordon Square Arts District under the mentorship of a Cleveland investor.

== About ==
The show was produced by SpringHill Entertainment and Magical Elves, with LeBron James and Maverick Carter as executive producers. It was hosted by Bonin Bough, with Kumar Arora, Alan Glazen, Kathy Futey, and Jonathan Sawyer as its panel of investors, and LeBron James making cameos once in a while.

The show was based in the Gordon Square Arts District, a commercial hub in Cleveland's Detroit-Shoreway neighbourhood near Lake Erie. Cleveland had been second on the Distressed Community Index, and fourth on the list of dying cities. CNBC announced that it would "help a neighborhood that desperately needs investment", and may have assisted Gordon Square's revitalization. One business owner, however, suggested that "To create good TV, you have to create a villain. That villain was vacancies", and investor Sawyer confirmed that "the neighborhood was going to be there with or without the show... It was going in that direction, is going in that direction and buildings are still affordable".

In each of the first four episodes, two businesses presented competing pitches and ran a pop-up shop, with one of the businesses being selected for mentoring and financing. The remaining four episodes focussed on stages in the setup and opening of the selected stores.

=== Cast ===
Bonin Bough: former executive VP for PR firms Weber Shandwick and Ruder Finn who then joined PepsiCo in 2008. Serving as its senior global director for digital and social media, his work resulted in Fast Company naming him one of its "100 Most Creative People In Business" in 2011. Between 2012 and 2016, he worked for multinational food company Mondelez International, where he became its chief media and e-commerce officer. He is a member of the Board of Directors of Philip Morris International, the multinational tobacco company.

Kumar Arora: CEO of investment firm Aroridex, founder of designer sunglasses company Rogue Eyewear, and investor in iLTHY, a streetwear apparel company.

Kathy Futey: A wealth management advisor who previously worked at Morgan Stanley. She serves on the board of the Museum of Contemporary Art Cleveland (MOCA) and the Cuyahoga Valley Chamber of Commerce.

Alan Glazen: A neighborhood developer, and retired advertising executive. He co-founded the Cleveland International Film Festival, and was once mayor of the village of Bentleyville, Ohio

Jonathon Sawyer: Chef and owner of three Cleveland restaurants, including the Greenhouse Tavern for which he won a James Beard Foundation Award in 2015 as Best Chef: Great Lakes. He was a finalist on the Food Network's 2016 Chopped Grill Masters series.

== Episodes ==
No.	Title	Original release date	U.S. viewers
1	"Bagels or Blowouts"	August 24, 2016	253,000
"The Cleveland Bagel Co." (winner) vs hairdresser "Styles of Success"
2	"Honey vs. Hip"	August 31, 2016	250,000
"Akron Honey Co." vs handbag shop "FOUNT" (winner)
3	"Downward Dog vs. Proper Pigs"	September 7, 2016	175,000
BBQ food restaurant "The Proper Pig" vs yoga school "Groundswell" (winner)
4	"Soda Bars vs. Pickle Jars"	September 14, 2016	164,000
"Randy's Pickles" vs soft drink manufacturers "Old City Soda" (winner)
5	"Location, Location, Location"	September 21, 2016	182,000
6	"Expanding Horizons"	September 28, 2016	199,000
7	"Constructive Criticism"	October 5, 2016	213,000
8	"Open for Business!"	October 12, 2016	150,000
