= Brother Luck =

American chef

Brother Marcellus Haywood Luck IV is an American chef who has appeared on several reality cooking shows.

== Early life and education ==
Luck was born in San Francisco and spent time abroad with his parents. He is the fourth generation in his family to be named Brother Marcellus Luck. Vice described Luck as "a fair-skinned, half-Creole and half-Cajun, biracial man". His father died when he was 10 years old, and he and his younger brother were raised by their mother. From the age 14, he started working in professional kitchens and won various culinary scholarships and competitions in high school. When Luck was 16, his mother went to prison and he raised his brother.

Luck attended The Art Institute of Phoenix in Phoenix, Arizona after studying at Metro Tech High School. Luck became a Certified Executive Chef through the American Culinary Federation.

== Career ==
After culinary school, Luck worked in various restaurants, including Takitei and Kinjhoro Ryokans in Kanazawa, Japan. Luck is the owner of the restaurant Brother Luck Street Eats in Colorado Springs, Colorado. He competed on Food Network's Beat Bobby Flay in 2016 and won. He was also a contestant on season 31 of Chopped, Top Chef: Colorado, and Top Chef: Kentucky.

In 2017, Luck opened Four by Brother Luck, and also owns the Lucky Dumplings, both in Colorado Springs. He was nominated for but did not win a James Beard Award.
