= Maneet Chauhan =

Indian-American chef (born 1976)

- Born: 27 October 1976 (age 49); Ludhiana, Punjab, India
- Education: Manipal University (Welcomgroup Graduate School of Hotel Administration); Culinary Institute of America
- Spouse: Vivek Deora
- Children: 2
- Culinary career
- Cooking style: Global Fusion with roots in Indian cuisine
- Television shows: Chopped; Iron Chef America; The Next Iron Chef; Worst Cooks in America; Designing Spaces; Tournament of Champions; Guy's Grocery Games
- Website: maneetchauhan.com

Maneet Chauhan (born 27 October 1976 in Ludhiana, Punjab) is an Indian American chef and television personality. Previously the executive chef of several notable restaurants in Chicago, Nashville, and New York, she is featured as a judge on Chopped on the Food Network. She has appeared on The Next Iron Chef, on The View on ABC, Iron Chef America, the Today show on NBC, and as a judge on the finale of Worst Cooks in America on Food Network. She has also won the 2021 and 2024 Food Network competition Tournament of Champions.

== Career ==
Chauhan was born into a Punjabi Rajput Sikh household. She began her culinary career at the Manipal Academy of Higher Education's WelcomGroup Graduate School of Hotel Administration, Manipal, India, where she earned a bachelor's degree in Hotel Management. She then attended the Culinary Institute of America in Hyde Park, New York. As an apprentice chef, she worked in India with the Oberoi Group, Taj Group, Welcome Group and Sheraton Group.

In 2000, she was hired as management for a startup restaurant in Cherry Hill, New Jersey, where she headed a team and expanded the restaurant's capacity from 70 seats to 140 seats. In 2003, at the age of 27, she became the opening executive chef of Vermilion in Chicago, Illinois. In 2007, she moved to NYC to open At Vermilion. Her style is described as "global fusion" with roots in Indian cuisine. Chauhan has participated in fundraisers to benefit underprivileged children in India and the typhoon relief efforts in the Philippines.

=== Books ===
She wrote her first cookbook, Flavors of My World: A Culinary Tour Through 25 Countries, published by Favorite Recipes Press.

Her second book, authored with Katy Sparks, Alex Raij, Rita Sodi and Kathleen Squires, was called The Journey. Her most recent cookbook Chaat, co-authored with Jody Eddy, was released in October 2020 and includes over eighty Indian recipes with a focus on street food and local cuisine.

=== Restaurant ===
Chauhan opened her first restaurant in Nashville, Tennessee. It is called "Chauhan Ale and Masala House". The restaurant, which accommodates 150, opened in August 2014.

== See also ==
- Chopped (TV series)
