= Jet Tila =

American celebrity chef and restaurateur

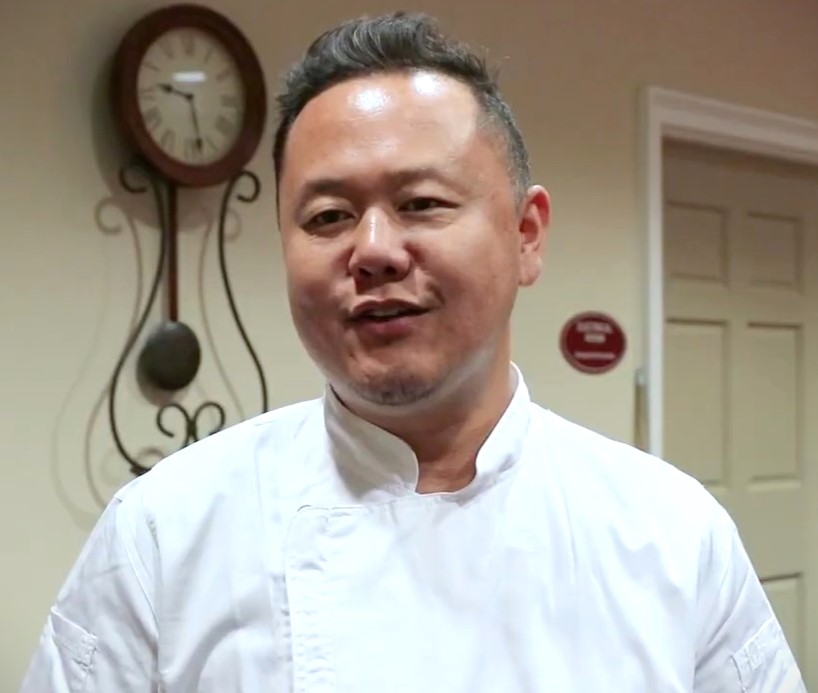
- Tila in 2018
- Born: Jet Tilakamonkul; February 6, 1975 (age 51); Los Angeles, California, U.S.
- Spouse: Ali Tila
- Culinary career
- Current restaurant(s): Pakpao Thai, Los Angeles (2014–2024)
- Previous restaurant(s): The Charleston, Los Angeles (2014–2021)
- Website: chefjet.com

Jet Tilakamonkul, known professionally as Jet Tila (Thai: เจ็ท ติลกมลกุล; RTGS: Chet Tilakamonkun), is an American celebrity chef, author, restaurateur, and restaurant developer.

== Early life ==
Tila was born in Los Angeles to Thai Chinese parents who immigrated to the United States separately in 1966. His family traces their ancestry to the southern Chinese island province of Hainan.

== Restaurant and culinary career ==
Jet Tila is the chef of the restaurants The Charleston and Pakpao Thai, located in Los Angeles, California, and Dallas, Texas, respectively. Tila is the restaurant developer of Dragon Tiger Noodle Co. with three locations in Las Vegas and Henderson, Nevada. Tila has acted as a restaurant developer and minor partner for the chain restaurant Pei Wei Asian Kitchen (also known as Pei Wei Asian Diner, LLC).

Tila was given a ceremonial title of a "culinary ambassador" for Thailand, appointed by the Royal Thai Consulate-General in Los Angeles.

Tila has also been part of several novelty food-based records, including world's largest stir fry, world's largest seafood stew, world's largest fruit salad and world's largest California roll.

== Television and other media ==
He has appeared on television series including Beat Bobby Flay, The Best Thing I Ever Ate, Chopped, Cutthroat Kitchen, Tournament of Champions, and Guy's Grocery Games. Tila is a regular on the Food Network television channel. He was a contestant on Iron Chef America but lost to The Iron Chef. In 2018, he returned to Iron Chef America as the floor reporter. Tila appeared on Gods of Food, a satirical food mockumentary by CollegeHumor. Tila won $20,000 as the victorious competitor in Guy's Grocery Games "Delivery: All-Star Noodles" (2021). Tila is one of the co-hosts of the new Food Network show, Halloween Cookie Challenge.

== Personal life ==
Tila is married. He and his wife Allison have two children: a daughter, Amaya, and a son, Ren.

== Publications ==
- Tila, Jet (2017). 101 Asian dishes you need to cook before you die: discover a new world of flavors in authentic recipes. Page Street Publishing Co. ISBN 978-1-62414-382-3.
- Tila, Jet; Tila, Ali (2019). 101 Epic Dishes: Recipes That Teach You How to Make the Classics Even More Delicious. Page Street Publishing. ISBN 978-1624145735.
- Tila, Jet; Fukomoto, Tad Weyland (2022). 101 Thai Dishes You Need to Cook Before You Die: The Essential Recipes, Techniques and Ingredients of Thailand. Page Street Publishing. ISBN 9781645673675.
