= Guilty Pleasures (TV series) =

2015 American television series

- Genre: Food reality television
- Country of origin: United States
- Original language: English
- No. of seasons: 3
- No. of episodes: 29

Production
- Running time: 22 minutes

Original release
- Network: Food Network
- Release: May 25, 2015 – September 24, 2016

Guilty Pleasures is an American food-themed television series that premiered on May 25, 2015 on Food Network. The series features chefs and other celebrities exploring various types of food that are considered a guilty pleasure – "from a 24-layer chocolate cake, to a mega-bacon cheeseburger, to a filet mignon covered in fried oysters".

== Episodes ==
=== Season 1 (2015) ===
No.	Title	Foods	Featured restaurants	Original air date
1	"Ooey-Gooey Obsessions"	Kitchen Sink sundae (Duff Goldman), beef lasagna (Bobby Flay), bacon mac and cheese burger (Robert Irvine), jumbo cupcakes (Lorraine Pascale), pastrami (David Alan Grier), pulled pork benedict (Alex Guarnaschelli)	Guy Fieri's Kitchen and Bar (NV), Rao's (NV), Simona's Bakery (NJ), Greenblatt's Deli (CA), Fair Oaks Pharmacy (CA), Smoke Daddy (IL)	May 25, 2015
2	"Decadent and Delicious"	Philly pork sandwich (Rachael Ray), pizza (Anne Burrell), onion coleslaw dog (Katie Lee), loaded Jersey sliders (Alex Guarnaschelli), apple tarte (Carla Hall), birthday cake (Duff Goldman)	White Manna (NJ), Serendipity 3 (NV), Lou Malnati's Pizzeria (IL), Midway Drive-In (WV), Tony Luke's (PA), Gato (NY)	June 1, 2015
3	"Killer Combos"	Sundae (Curtis Stone), chocolate French toast (Carla Hall), mac and cheese waffles (Fabio Viviani), strawberry blonde cheesecake (Robert Irvine), two-pound meat sandwich (Duff Goldman), hot fried chicken (Richard Blais),	Hattie B's Hot Chicken (TN), Sweet Rose Creamery (CA), Andiron Steak and Sea (NV), The Bongo Room (IL), Brooklyn Diner (NY), Charcoal Style (MD)	June 8, 2015
4	"Tale of Two Sandwiches"	Ice cream (Anne Burrell), bacon coffee cake (Alex Guarnaschelli), Italian sub Curtis Stone), Millionaire pie (Fabio Viviani), bourbon ginger pecan pie (Lorraine Pascale)	Primanti Brothers (PA), Bay Cities Italian Deli & Bakery (CA), Big Gay Ice Cream (NY), Supper (PA), SER Steak + Spirits (TX), Butter & Scotch (NY)	June 15, 2015
5	"Deep-Fried Delights"	Ham and cheese (Valerie Bertinelli), steak (Bobby Flay), pork tacos (Richard Blais), duck fat fries (Fabio Viviani), fried bologna sandwich (Carla Hall), maple bacon donut (Daphne Brogdon), croque madame (Valerie Bertinelli)	Wolfgang's Steakhouse (NY), Martin's Bar-B-Que Joint (TN), Carnita's Snack Shack (CA), Donut Friend (CA), Petit Trois (CA), Salty Sow (TX)	June 22, 2015
6	"You're Bacon Me Crazy"	Fried chicken (David Alan Grier), barbecue platter (Daphne Brogdon), tenderloin with crab and butter sauce (Bobby Flay), nachos (Katie Lee), Frito pie and ribs (Alex Guarnaschelli), bacon caramel popcorn (Richard Blais, hoe cakes (Valerie Bertinelli)	Dudley's on Short (KY), Roscoe's House of Chicken 'N Waffles (CA), Cowgirl BBQ (NM), Kreuz Market (TX), Zazu Kitchen + Farm (CA), El Vez (PA), Barrel and Ashes (CA)	June 29, 2015

=== Season 2 (2015–16) ===
No.	Title	Foods	Featured restaurants	Original air date
1	"Thanksgiving Madness"	Turkey waffle (Guy Fieri), Pumpple cake (Amanda Freitag), Mississippi Hot Brown sandwich (Joey Lawrence), sweet potato bread pudding (Jackée Harry), pumpkin cheesecake (Ross Mathews), turducken	Funk 'n Waffles (NY), K-Paul's Louisiana Kitchen (LA), Sweet Potatoes (NC), The Purple Room (CA), Flying Monkey Bakery (PA), City Grocery (MS)	November 16, 2015
2	"Guilty Obsessions"	Chili spaghetti (Ross Mathews), bleu-cheese burger (Graham Elliot), breakfast burrito (Judy Greer), chili dog (Justin Warner), churro ice cream sandwich (Kendra Wilkinson), Big Poppa tart (Duff Goldman)	Chili John's (CA), Donut Bar (CA), Brooklyn Kolache Co. (NY), Hugo's (CA), The Escondite (CA), Toca Madera (CA)	November 23, 2015
3	"Deep-Fried Sweet Tooth"	Carne asada burrito (Guy Fieri), fried chicken sandwich (Jaleel White), lamb meatloaf sandwich (Alex Guarnaschelli), cotton candy (Jonathan Bennett), lamb ragu and Nutella fritelle (Brooke Burke-Charvet), macadamia turtle pie (Jeff Mauro)	Gibsons Bar & Steakhouse (IL), Barton G. The Restaurant (CA), Roberto's Taco Shop (NV), Odd Duck (TX), Son of a Gun (CA), Terroni (CA)	November 30, 2015
4	"Holiday Decadence"	Yule log cake (Jeff Mauro), latkes (Daphne Brogdon), deep-fried turkey (Christina and David Arquette), prime rib (Madison Cowan), banana pudding (Sherri Shepherd)	Bludso's BBQ (CA), Keens Steakhouse (NY), Barney Greengrass (NY), Rito's Bakery & Deli (OH), Sweet Lady Jane (CA), Sylvia's Restaurant of Harlem (NY)	December 7, 2015
5	"Holy Moly Burgers"	Bacon burger with donut bun (Duff Goldman), deep-fried fluffernutter (Tia Mowry), pork shoulder (Anne Burrell), PB&J cruffin (Gail Simmons), bacon-shrimp mac and cheese (Sam Champion), pork and beef sausage dog (Michael Symon)	Blue Collar (FL), Tony Packo's Cafe (OH), Mr. Holmes Bakehouse (CA), The Purple Pig (IL), Black Market Liquor Bar (CA), Oh My Burger (CA)	December 14, 2015
6	"Cheesiest and Meatiest"	Cheesesteak (Buddy Valastro), green chili mac and cheese (Fabio Viviani), fried chicken (Rocco DiSpirito), chocolate cake (Marc Summers), toffee cake (Aarti Sequeira), pizza (Tia Mowry)	Roaring Fork (TX), The Cake Bake Shop (IN), Piccolo's (NJ), Westside Tavern (CA), Art and Soul (Washington, DC), Prova Pizzeria (CA)	December 21, 2015
7	"Pig Out!"	Pork chop (Jeff Mauro), burger (Bobby Deen), short rib hash (Alex Guarnaschelli), burger and molten chocolate cake (Salt and Pepa), country fried steak (Christina and David Arquette), fried ice cream (Duff Goldman)	GAS Full Service Restaurant (FL), The Rosebud (IL), Frach's Fried Ice Cream (CA), Rennick Meat Market (OH), Mohawk House (NJ), House of Pies (CA)	January 4, 2016
8	"Sweet and Salty Addictions"	Tamago burger (Jet Tila), chicken and waffle croquettes (Daphne Brogdon), grilled cheese (Katie Lee), tiramisu (Brooke Burke-Charvet), apple spice cupcake (Marc Murphy), peach cobbler French toast (Jaleel White)	IveyCake (TN), Bottega Louie (CA), Fukuburger (NV), Joan's on Third (CA), The Flavor Table Catering (CA), Mud Hen Tavern (CA)	January 11, 2016
9	"Golden-Fried Deliciousness"	Spaghetti and meatball sandwich (Fabio Viviani), New Orleans oyster po-boy (Nancy Fuller), Barnyard Burger (Joey Lawrence), hot crab dip (Jackée Harry), chicken burrito (Ross Mathews), apple pie (Richard Blais)	Julian Pie Company (CA), Lemaire Restaurant (VA), American Glory BBQ (NY), The Carving Board (CA), Las Casuelas Terraza (CA), Village Tavern (NC)	January 18, 2016
10	"Coast to Coast Indulgences"	Bacon brownie (Alfonso Ribeiro), macaroni and lobster cream (Tia Mowry), goat biscuit sandwich (Amanda Freitag), bacon apple pie (Gail Simmons), Italian sub (Guy Fieri)	Maple Street Biscuit Company (FL), White House Sub Shop (NJ), Slater's 50/50 (CA), The Atlantic ChipShop (NY), Lincoln Restaurant (OR), Catch New York (NY)	January 25, 2016
11	"Big Game, Big Eats"	Chicken wings (Jonathan Bennett), Bloody Mary (Jeff Mauro), barbecue nachos (Aarón Sánchez), pizza (Judy Greer), chocolate ice cream soda (Justin Warner), carne asada tacos (Graham Elliot)	Chef Point (TX), Peg Leg Porker (TN), Fricker's (OH), 10 Park Lanes (NC), Taco Love (CA), Village Pizzeria (CA)	February 3, 2016
12	"Chocolate Obsessions"	Chocolate cake (Tia Mowry), waffle taco (Richard Blais), chocolate macadamia cake (Anne Burrell), chocolate soufflé (Geoffrey Zakarian, chocolate tower (Marc Summers), chocolate cake milkshake (Sherri Shepherd	Playa Provisions (CA), Portillo's (IL), Bern's Steak House (FL), Gladstones (CA), Mueller Chocolate Co. (PA), Le Cirque (NY)	February 10, 2016
13	"Meat Lover Mania!"	Italian sausage (Buddy Valastro), dessert nachos (Ross Mathews), sweet and salty biscuit (Aarti Sequeira), burger (Graham Elliot), Jagerschnitzel and spätzle (Daphne Brogdon), muffuletta (Alex Guarnaschelli)	Biscuit Love (TN), Kuma's Corner (IL), Central Grocery (LA), The Red Lion Tavern (CA), The Treats Truck (NY), The Montville Inn (NJ)	

=== Season 3 (2016) ===
No.	Title	Foods	Featured restaurants	Original air date
1	"Pizza and Pigzilla!"	Fried chicken waffles (Jonathan Bennett), rib and cheddar duck fat fries (Bobby Deen), 4lb barbecue sandwich (Aarón Sánchez), salted caramel sundae (Carnie Wilson), venison enchilada (Gail Simmons), built-your-own pizza (Duff Goldman)	Joe Squared Pizza (MD), 1 Pico (CA), Dai Due (TX), Village Whiskey (PA), Papa Buck's BBQ (GA), The Churchill (CA)	July 9, 2016
2	"Sweet and Savory Confessions"	Veal parmigiana (Alex Guarnaschelli), bread pudding (Salt and Pepa), lamb meatball sliders (Carson Kressley), B.E.C. sandwich (Marc Murphy), nachos (Michael Symon), passion fruit meringue pie (Amanda Freitag)	Chef Vola's (NJ), Hoosier Mama Pie Company (IL), Fahrenheit (OH), Bowery Meat Company (NY), Locanda Verde (NY), Egg Shop (NY)	July 30, 2016
3	"Deep-Fried Decadence"	Pancake lasagna (Jonathan Bennett), cheeseburger (Marcus Samuelsson), deep-fried Twinkie (Carnie Wilson), lamb biscuit (Carla Hall), Sweet Baby Jesus with Scrapple (Duff Goldman), beef ribs (Bobby Deen), double cheeseburger (Marcus Samuelsson)	Beer Belly (CA), Blue Moon Cafe (MD), Holeman and Finch Public House (GA), Mason Dixie Biscuit Co. (Washington, DC), Smoketown USA (KY), The Roof on Wilshire (CA)	July 16, 2016
4	"Cinnamon, Steak and Cake!"	Cinnamon rolls (Graham Elliot), bacon-wrapped filet mignon (Alfonso Ribiero), birthday cake (Sam Champion), fried chicken waffle sandwich (Nancy Fuller), paccheri (Rocco DiSpirito), roasted beef and mutz (Buddy Valastro)	F. McLintocks (CA), Old West Cinnamon Rolls (CA), Momofuku Milk Bar (NY), Fiore's (NJ), Root & Bone (NY), MC Kitchen (FL)	July 23, 2016
5	"Sweet Eats vs. Decadent Treats"	Crab cake (Duff Goldman), fried chicken (Marcus Samuelsson), turkey and cranberry sauce sandwich (Kendra Wilkinson), steak with foie gras and truffles (Rocco DiSpirito), corned beef hash (Jet Tila), pink champagne cake (Carson Kressley)	Madonna Inn (CA), The Corner Stable (MD), Bruddah's Bar & Grill (CA), Capriotti's (NV), The Forge (FL), Charles' Pan-Fried Chicken (NY)	July 30, 2016
6	"Plead Guilty to Pastrami, Poutine and Pork!"	Pastrami egg roll (Jaleel White), poutine burger (Fabio Viviani), cajeta-stuffed churros (Madison Cowan), Baked Alaska (Joey Lawrence), schnitzel sandwich (Jeff Mauro), spaghetti and stromboli (Kendra Wilkinson)	RedFarm (NY), Mile End Delicatessen (NY), CUT Steakhouse (CA), Hopdoddy Burger Bar (TX), Scarpetta (CA), Truck U Barbeque (NV), Bohemian House (IL)	August 6, 2016
7	"Super-Stuffed Gluttony!"	Nutella lasagna (Geoffrey Zakarian), mac and cheese pizza (Ross Mathews), banana-stuffed French toast (Tia Mowry), eggplant parmesan (Marc Summers), turducken hot dog (Richard Blais), beef ribs (Aarón Sánchez)	Hometown Bar-B-Que (NY), Franks 'N' Dawgs (IL), Scrumptious Cafe & Bakery (CA), The Kitchen Consigliere (NJ), PIZZANISTA! (CA)	August 13, 2016
8	"Splurge with No Regrets"	Cuban sandwich (Richard Blais), biscuit sandwich (Ross Mathews), tater tot salad (Carnie Wilson), two-layer ice cream sandwich (Duff Goldman), pork shank (Marc Murphy), chicken liver (Michael Symon)	Pine State Biscuits (OR), Komodo (CA), Crispo (NY), Coolhaus, Grove Hill (OH)	August 20, 2016
9	"Double-Down Chow Down!"	Strawberry shortcake (Jackée Harry), honey-chili pizza (Daphne Oz), chocolate French toast (Carson Kressley), fried chicken benedict (Jet Tila), pork gravy with ricotta (Aarón Sánchez), smoked meat poutine (Alex Guarnaschelli)	Hash House A Go Go (NV), Junior's Cheesecake & Desserts (NY), The Purple Pig (IL), Roberta's (NY), Norma's at Le Parker Meridien (CA)	August 27, 2016
10	"Fried Fabulous Fun"	Toasted ravioli (Jeff Mauro), cookie skillet (Daphne Oz), beef tenderloin enchiladas with quail (Justin Warner), Kung Pao chicken (Geoffrey Zakarian), Wagyu brisket sandwich (Carla Hall), scrambled eggs (Brooke Burke-Charvet)	Mama Toscano's (MO), Del Campo (Washington, DC), Pier 115 Bar and Grill (NJ), Gato (NY), Cafe China (NY), Ranch 616 (TX)	September 3, 2016
11	"Bringin' Home the Bacon, Burger and BBQ!"	Migas (Alex Guarnaschelli), meat plate (Buddy Valastro), steak and Margherita sandwich (Nancy Fuller), pasta carbonara (Daphne Brogdon), Oreo ice cream sandwich (Richard Blais), lamb and green chile stew (Fabio Viviani)	Fox Bros Bar-B-Q (GA), Fred's Texas Cafe (TX), Sublime Doughnuts (GA), Vinny's Deli (NY), Eatalian (CA), Magnolia Cafe (TX)	September 10, 2016
12	"O.M.G. Food!"	Fried chicken parmigiana (Christina and David Arquette), pork ribs (Anne Burrell), 4lb Mardi Gras-inspired cake (Aarón Sánchez), chicken tikka poutine (Aarti Sequeira), pork and cheese arepas (Richard Blais), buffalo fries (Katie Lee)	Dinosaur Bar-B-Que (NY), Dan Tana's (CA), Willa Jean (LA), Badmaash (CA), Townline BBQ (NY), La Latina (FL)	September 17, 2016
13	"The Deep-Fried!"	Deep dish pizza (Tia Mowry), chili spaghetti (Katie Lee), grilled cheese (Judy Greer), banana bread French toast (Alfonso Ribeiro), sirloin (Sam Champion), fried chicken (Aarti Sequeira)	Beer Belly (CA), Skyline Chili (OH), Stepping Stone Cafe (OR), Plan Check Kitchen + Bar (CA), Giordano's (IL), CUT Steakhouse (CA)	September 24, 2016
