= No Kitchen Required =

- Raymond, Psilakis and Cowan
- Genre: Game show, reality television
- Created by: Chachi Senior; Kevin Greene; Cleve Keller; Dave Noll
- Presented by: Shini Somara
- Starring: Madison Cowan; Michael Psilakis; Kayne Raymond
- Country of origin: United States
- Original language: English

Original release
- Network: BBC America

No Kitchen Required is a television cooking show produced by BBC America that first aired in 2012. The show centres on three professional chefs who immerse themselves in a different culture each episode and then attempt to cook meals in the style of that culture with produce acquired by traditional means and with no commercial kitchen.

== Format ==
Hosted by Dr Shini Somara (previously the host of The Health Show), each episode focuses on a different "traditional" or "tribal" culture. The three participating chefs are introduced to tribal or cultural elders who provide an overview of their culture and cuisine. The chefs are then treated to a traditional meal to allow them to gain an understanding of the local cuisine. A ballot is then drawn to determine which "core ingredient" each chef will be required to use.

The following day, with the assistance of a tribal or traditional advisor, each chef is required to acquire their core ingredient. During the 10 episodes of Season 1, core ingredients included hunted wild boar, hand-caught rock lobster and trap-caught river eel. Though the chefs are given instructions and guidance, they are expected to catch and kill animals themselves using traditional methods. The core ingredients are then supplemented with produce from local farmers, barter markets and gathered food.

The chefs then return to "camp" where they cook a three-course meal which is supposed to blend their own cooking style with traditional techniques and flavours from that culture. Each chef is allowed to bring a chef's knife and a single additional (non-traditional) ingredient. They prepare food with basic utensils at a covered bench and cook over an open fire. Their food is then served to a panel of 4 judges from that tribe or culture. Judges are given three colours tokens (each colour corresponds to a particular chef) and are asked by the host to cast a single vote for the chef they believes best represented their traditional cuisine. In each instance, a tribal leader is chosen who holds a casting vote in the event of a tie.

The winner is announced and the winning chef is brought before the traditional elders to be "honoured by the tribe". The winning chef then thanks the judges and presents the tribe with gifts. Gifts during Season 1 included sporting equipment, fishing gear and children's games.

== Season 1 ==
The first season of the show included visits to international tribes and traditional cultures in Dominica, New Zealand, Thailand and Fiji and domestic (US) cultural groups in the Louisiana bayou, New Mexico, Florida and Hawaii.

=== Participants ===
- Madison Cowan - UK-born chef, first ever Grand Champion of Food Network's Chopped, Extreme Chef judge and winner of Iron Chef America's Battle Kale.
- Michael Psilakis - Greek-American New York City restaurateur, a judge on Ultimate Recipe Showdown, a participant on Iron Chef America and a host of The Best Thing I Ever Ate.
- Kayne Raymond - New Zealand-born private chef and a participant on Chopped.

== Reception ==
Upon introduction, the show was described as being, "One part Survivor, two parts Top Chef, with a dash of The Amazing Race".

One reviewer pointed out that the lack of elimination (an aspect the show does not share with other "cooking competition" shows) meant that No Kitchen Required contestants remained collegial and friendly throughout the season.

In Australia, the show aired on SBS Two and local media described the show as, "a wonderful study in TV's hybridisation of ideas: part Survivor, part MasterChef and part Man vs. Wild".
