= How to Eat a Small Country =

2011 memoir by Amy Finley

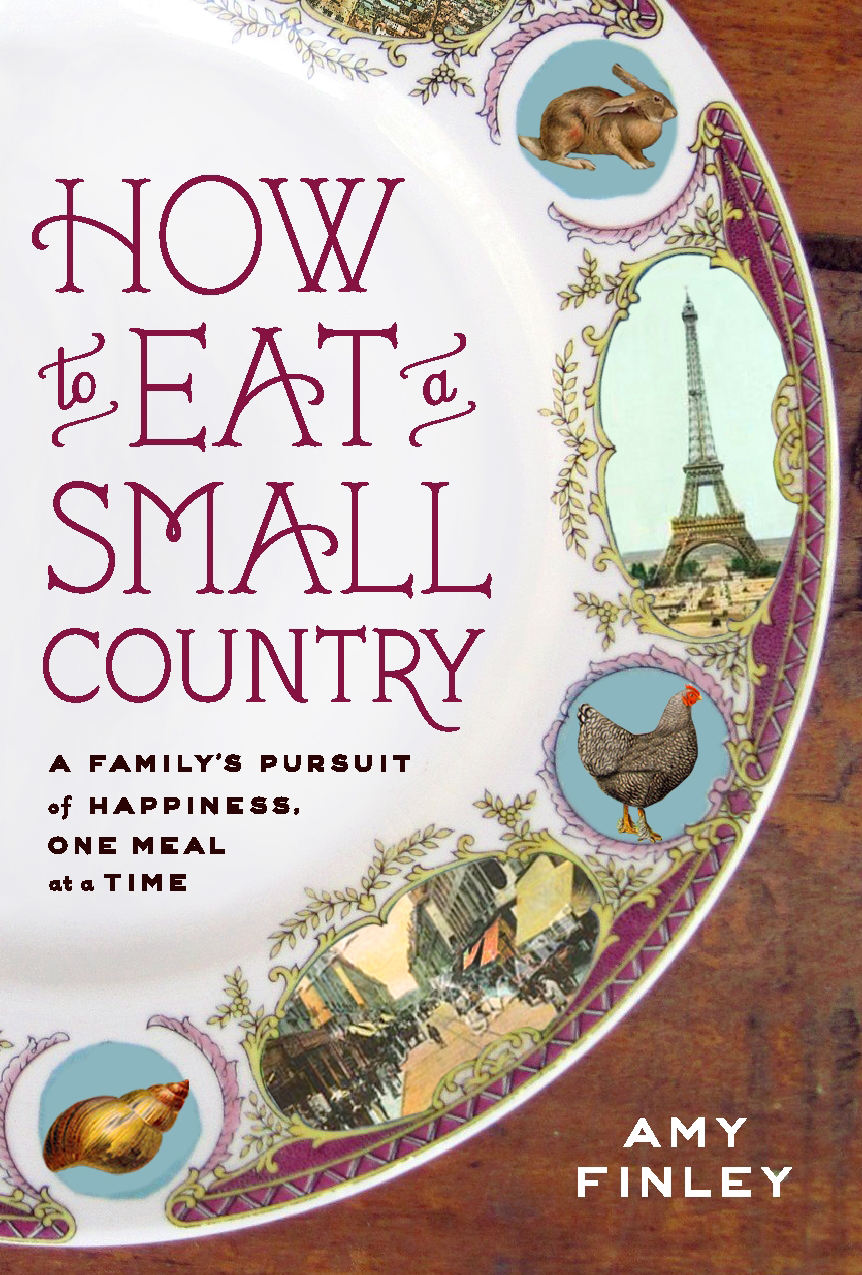
- US hardback cover
- Author: Amy Finley
- Language: English
- Subject: Food, France, Family, Cooking, Memoir
- Genre: Non-fiction
- Publisher: Clarkson Potter
- Publication date: March 29, 2011
- Publication place: United States
- Media type: Print (Hardback)
- Pages: 280 pp
- ISBN: 978--0-307-59138-8
- OCLC: 2010034504
- Dewey Decimal: 394.1'20944--dc22
- LC Class: GT2853.F7F56 2011

How to Eat a Small Country: A Family's Pursuit of Happiness, One Meal at a Time is a memoir by Amy Finley, the Season 3 winner of The Next Food Network Star and former host of The Gourmet Next Door on Food Network. The memoir, released by Clarkson Potter/Random House in April 2011, chronicles her abrupt departure from television in 2008 to save her marriage, moving her family to a rural farm in Burgundy, France and roadtripping around the country in search of some of the disappearing regional dishes written about by Waverly Root in his 1958 book, The Food of France.

== Story ==
A professionally trained cook turned anxious stay-at-home mom, Amy Finley's marriage was already in fragile shape when she sent in an audition tape for the third season of The Next Food Network Star. When she was cast on the show in 2007, her husband, who feared for their privacy and hated the idea of reality shows and what celebrity could do to their marriage, forbade her to participate, but Finley did anyway, hoping to jumpstart her career and self-esteem. But while she was filming the show in New York, her husband retaliated by threatening to divorce her. Finley was the last contestant eliminated from Season 3 before the two person finale and returned home defeated to put her marriage back in order, but was recalled into the competition when one of the finalists had to withdraw, and ultimately was voted the winner and starred in her own cooking show, The Gourmet Next Door. But she gave up the show when she realized her family was so shaky, the stress would probably cause her marriage to fail. To get away from a life that had gotten too complicated, they moved to France and took a road trip Finley had dreamed about since she was living in Paris, falling in love with her husband, and going to culinary school. They drive all over France, and while they are learning about and enjoying regional dishes, Finley tries to figure out how her marriage became so delicate, and how to make it, and herself, strong again.

== Critical reception ==
Some early readers reacted strongly to the book's opening chapter, in which Finley and her husband butcher a rabbit so that Finley can cook ‘’lapin a la moutarde", a traditional dish from Burgundy, where they are living. Throughout the book, Finley frankly discusses other old and disappearing French specialties, like ‘’tete de veau", the boiled face of a baby cow, and some readers found her descriptions off-putting.

Anthony Bourdain, himself notorious for graphic food descriptions, offered a blurb for the cover of the book and called it "an unexpected and delightful memoir." Cookbook author Dorie Greenspan and former Chez Panisse chef David Lebovitz also praised the book on its cover. Kirkus Reviews gave the book five stars and called it a "charming, bare-bones chronicle of a woman reclaiming her family and a couple reclaiming their relationship." Booklist also admired the book and called it a "bold bouillabaisse of a food memoir." The Boston Globe compared the book favorably to Eat, Pray, Love, calling How to Eat a Small Country, "less precious, more honest, and ultimately more rewarding" than Gilbert's book, and opined about the controversial rabbit chapter that, "cooking, real cooking, it turns out, is a test that reveals a lot more than eating does."
