= Madison Cowan =

British-American chef

- Born: Brixton, South London, UK
- Culinary career
- Previous restaurants: *Ashbells, London, * Tavern on the Green, New York City, * Avenue Inc., New York City, * Slide, New York City (2013–2014)
- Television shows: * Chopped (2010, 2015), * No Kitchen Required (2012), * Guy's Grocery Games (2015), * Tournament of Champions (2021–2022)
- Website: www.madisoncowan.com

Madison Cowan is a British-born American chef. He was the first Grand Champion of Food Network's Chopped. He co-stars in BBC America’s travel series No Kitchen Required, appeared as a judge on Food Network’s Extreme Chef and in cooking segments on NBC’s Today Show and CBS This Morning. Cowan resides in New York City.

== Early life ==
Madison Cowan was born in Brixton, South London; his father is from Jamaica and his mother is African-American. He started cooking at age 14.

His father was diagnosed with Alzheimer’s disease, which ran in their family, and was a catalyst for his own advocacy work for the disease.

== Restaurant and food career ==
Early in Cowan's career he worked at Tavern on the Green, under Patrick Clark. Cowan was an executive chef at Ashbells in London.

Cowan was a co-owner of Avenue Inc., a supper club and cater company in New York City. From March 2013 to 2014, Cowan was the consulting chef for the restaurant Slide, located at 174 Bleecker Street, New York City.

In 2018, he was a participant in Michelle Obama's "Chefs Move to Schools" project.

== Television appearances ==
In 2010, Cowan was awarded the first title of "Grand Champion" of the culinary reality television show Chopped (Food Network), which also had a cash prize of $50,000 USD.

In April 2012, he won "Battle: Kale" on Food Network's Iron Chef America (season 10, episode 13), with Amanda Freitag and his runner-up on Chopped Lance Nitahara serving as his sous chefs, defeating Iron Chef Jose Garces.
