= Amy Finley =

American cook & writer (born 1973)

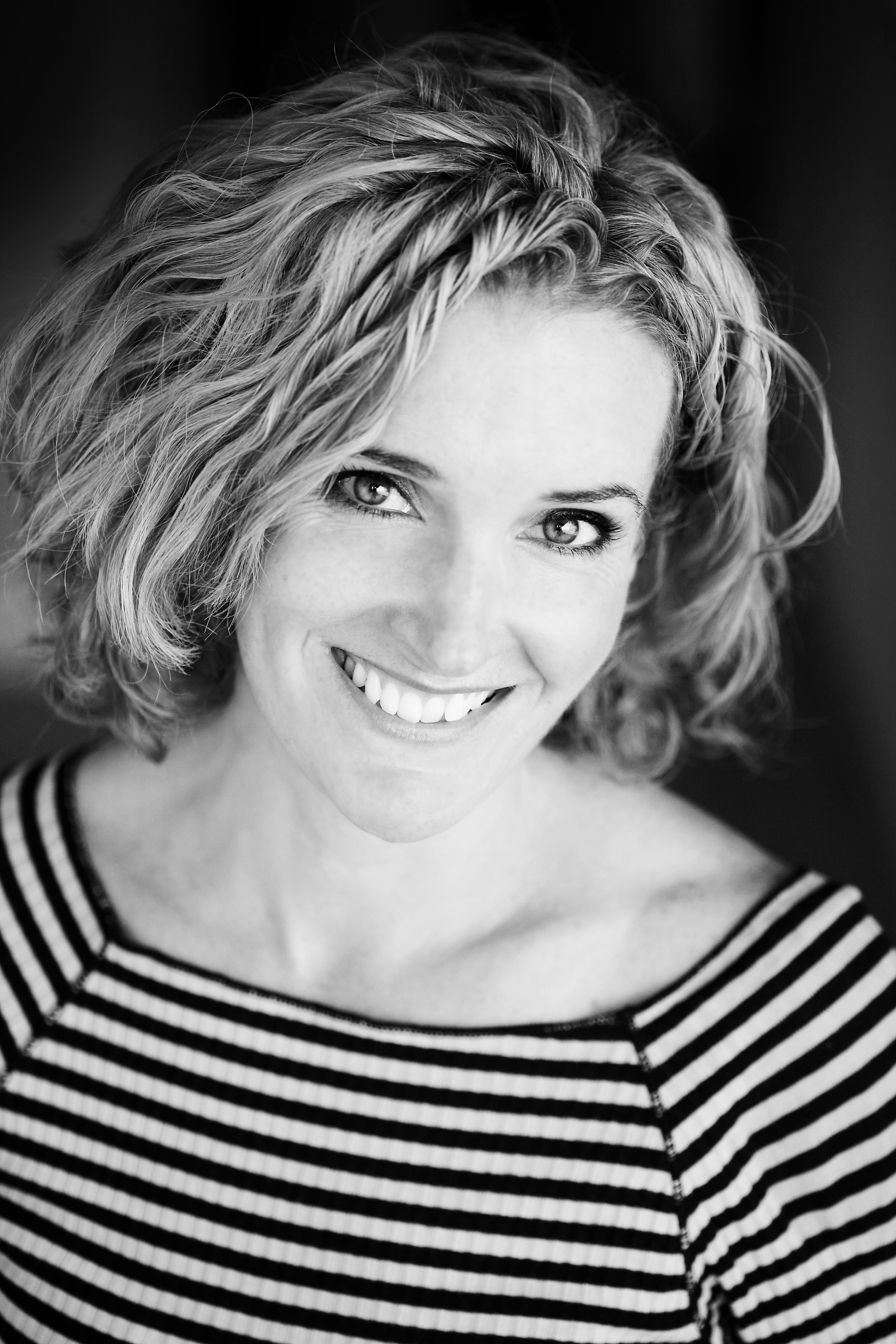
- Born: 1973 (age 52–53); San Diego, California, U.S.
- Education: École Gregoire-Ferrandi
- Culinary career
- Television show: The Gourmet Next Door

Amy Finley (born 1973 in San Diego, California) is an American cook and writer, who was the winner of the third season of The Next Food Network Star awarded a commitment to host a cooking show on the Food Network. Her program The Gourmet Next Door premiered on October 14, 2007, and aired for six episodes before Finley, citing a family crisis, cancelled further episodes and moved with her husband and children to a rural farm in Burgundy, France, an episode she chronicled in How to Eat a Small Country.

== Personal and professional life ==
Finley is a married mother of two children, a son named Indiana and a daughter named Scarlett. She attended Valhalla High School in El Cajon. She earned a Bachelor of Arts degree in Political Science from UCLA in 1995, after which she worked for the University of California, first at her alma mater, then at UCSD, where she was a science writer for the San Diego Supercomputer Center. She is the former assistant editor of Appellation Wine Country Living and Sun Valley Magazine. She met her husband and graduated from the École Gregoire-Ferrandi in Paris in 2001, worked briefly at the influential Rose Bakery in Paris in 2003, and in 2004 published a travel book on Italy, The Adventure Guide to the Italian Riviera. Since appearing on NFNS she has written for Bon Appetit and San Diego Magazine and has appeared on The View and The Splendid Table on NPR in addition to other national and regional magazines, television and radio programs. Her culinary inspirations are French grandmothers and Julia Child. Her food writing has been influenced by Waverly Root.

== Television ==
Finley was the winner of the third season of The Next Food Network Star. She originally attempted to remove herself from the competition following a disastrous five-minute cooking demonstration in Week 5, but was rebuffed by the judges. She was eliminated in Week 7, but after Josh "JAG" Garcia withdrew from the competition for lying about his culinary and military background, Amy was reinstated for the finale in his place, and she was voted the winner over runner-up Rory Schepisi making her the second female contestant to win in this show.

The Gourmet Next Door was named after the theme she adopted through the competition, demonstrating the ease of cooking like a gourmet chef at home. The show aired from October 14 to December 23, 2007, for a total of six episodes, after which it was quietly replaced in its timeslot with reruns of Guy's Big Bite. Following months of speculation, Finley revealed in May 2008 that she had voluntarily turned down the opportunity to return for a second season, citing the stress of the obligations of being a television personality. She resided in Burgundy, France, with her family before they returned to San Diego.

In 2012, Finley appeared on an episode of Chopped featuring past Food Network Star winners Aarti Sequeira, Melissa d'Arabian, and Jeff Mauro. She was eliminated after the second round.
