= Dessert Games =

US television program

- Genre: Reality; Cooking; Game show
- Starring: Duff Goldman and Guy Fieri
- Country of origin: United States
- Original language: English
- No. of seasons: 1
- No. of episodes: 4

Production
- Running time: 60 Minutes
- Production company: Relativity Media

Original release
- Network: Food Network
- Release: July 10 – July 31, 2017

Dessert Games is an American-based cooking television game show hosted by Duff Goldman and Guy Fieri on Food Network (USA), that debuted in 2017. The show is a spin-off to Guy's Grocery Games (GGG).

== Synopsis ==
Each episode features four chefs competing in a three-round elimination contest, cooking desserts with ingredients found in a supermarket grocery store (GGG's Flavortown Market) as Duff or Guy poses unusual challenges to them. The winning chef can collect $10,000.

== History ==
The show is based on the popular show Guy’s Grocery Games, which aired back in October 2013 and has had a run of 15 seasons.

The host of this new show Dessert Games is Guy Fieri together with the judges Ron Ben Israel and Duff Goldman. The show is produced by the production company Lando Entertainment and the executive producer is by John Bravakis, Steve Kroopnick, Brian Lando, Francesco Giuseppe Pace and Guy Fieri.

A backdoor pilot for the series aired as part of GGG, season 9 episode 12, "Guy's Dessert Grocery Games", aired on 26 June 2016 under the title Guy's Dessert Games, featuring Duff suggesting the theme of the show to Guy, and being a judge on that 2016 episode.

The series first airs in 2017 on the Food Network, with Duff as host, and Guy as guest star, with the standard complement of 3 judges and 4 competitors in an episode, inheriting from GGG.

== Episodes ==
=== Season 1 ===
No. overall	No. in season	Title	Original release date	Prod. code	Viewers (millions)
1	1	"Welcome to Sweet City"	July 10, 2017	TBA	N/A
2	2	"Piece of Cake"	July 17, 2017	TBA	N/A
3	3	"Sugar High"	July 24, 2017	TBA	N/A
4	4	"Guilty a la Mode"	July 31, 2017	TBA	N/A

== See also ==
- Guy's Grocery Games
