= Tommy's Diner =

- Interactive map of Tommy's Diner

Restaurant information
- Location: 914 West Broad Street, Columbus, Ohio, United States
- Coordinates: 39°57′34″N 83°01′30″W

Tommy's Diner is a restaurant in Columbus, Ohio, United States. Established on July 2, 1989, it has been featured on Diners, Drive-Ins and Dives.

== See also ==
- List of Diners, Drive-Ins and Dives episodes
