= Roof of Africa =

Roof of Africa may refer to:

- Ethiopian Highlands, highest concentration of mountains in Africa
- Mount Kilimanjaro, the highest mountain in Africa
- A motorcycle rally in Lesotho; see FIM Hard Enduro World Championship
- "Roof of Africa", an episode of the TV series Perilous Journeys

== See also ==
- From the Roof of Africa, a 1971 book by C. W. Nicol
