= Guy's All-American Road Trip =

American reality cooking show

- Genre: Reality; Cooking
- Starring: Guy Fieri
- Country of origin: United States
- Original language: English

Production
- Executive producer: Guy Fieri

Original release
- Network: Food Network
- Release: 2022

Guy’s All-American Road Trip is a reality television series that debuted in 2022 on the Food Network.
