= Dump City Dumplings =

Restaurant in Bend, Oregon, U.S.

- Interactive map of Dump City Dumplings

Restaurant information
- Location: 1244 NW Galveston Ave., Bend, Oregon, 97703, United States
- Coordinates: 44°03′25″N 121°19′47″W
- Website: dumpcitydumplings.com

Dump City Dumplings is a restaurant in Bend, Oregon. It has been featured on Diners, Drive-Ins and Dives.

== See also ==
- List of Diners, Drive-Ins and Dives episodes
