= Michael Psilakis =

American celebrity chef, author, and restaurateur

- Born: New York City, New York, U.S.
- Culinary career
- Current restaurants
- MP Taverna, Irvington NY
- Previous restaurants
- * Ecco, Long Island (2001–2004), * Onera, New York City (2004–2007), * Anthos, New York (2007–2010), * Mia Donna, New York City (2008–2009), * Kefi, New York City (2008–2020), * Gus & Gabriel Gastropub, New York City (2009–2010), * Fishtag, New York City (2011–2018), * MP Taverna, New York City (2013–2019)
- Television shows
- * Iron Chef America (2006, 2010, 2011), * Ultimate Recipe Showdown (2009–2010), * Beat Bobby Flay (2014–2016, 2019), * Chopped (2015, 2017), * Tournament of Champions (2022)
- Website: www.michaelpsilakis.com

Michael Psilakis is an American celebrity chef, author, and restaurateur. He is best known for his Greek cuisine and appearances on television shows including Ultimate Recipe Showdown, Iron Chef America, The Best Thing I Ever Ate and No Kitchen Required. He has owned and operated a number of popular restaurants around New York City and has cooked for President Barack Obama at the White House.

== Early life ==
Michael Psilakis was born in New York City, and is of Greek descent.

== Restaurant and food career ==
From 2001 to 2004, Psilakis managed restaurant Ecco on Long Island.

The address of 222 West 79th Street on the Upper West Side, Manhattan has been home to many of Psilakis restaurants including Onera (from 2004 to 2007); Kefi (from 2007 to 2009); Gus & Gabriel Gastropub (from 2009 to August 2010); Fishtag (from 2011 to 2018); followed by Kefi returning to this same location from 2018 until 2020, after Kefi had relocated for a period from 2009 until 2018 on 505 Columbus Avenue. Restaurant Kefi had been the subject of multiple employee lawsuits.

Donatella Arpaia and Michael Psilakis had co-owned Kefi, as well as Anthos at 36 West 52nd Street (2007–March 2010), and Mia Donna (2008–September 2009).

For his work at Anthos, Psilakis was named Esquire magazine's Chef of the Year in 2006. In 2008, he received a Michelin Star for Anthos. In 2008 he was named Bon Appétit's Chef of the Year.

From April 2013 to 2019, Psilakis owned and operated restaurant, MP Taverna on Ditmars Boulevard in Astoria, Queens.

== Television appearances ==
Psilakis served as a judge on Ultimate Recipe Showdown and was twice a contestant on Iron Chef America (2006 and 2010). He hosted The Best Thing I Ever Ate.

When BBC America created No Kitchen Required in 2012, Psilakis was chosen as one of three participants and a co-executive producer for the first series. He has also appeared a number of times on Good Morning America, and has been announced as a contestant on the "Superstar Sabotage" tournament of Cutthroat Kitchen.

== Books ==
Psilakis has struggled with his body weight and wrote the 2017 book, Live to Eat: Cooking the Mediterranean Way (Little, Brown) to highlight easier ways to modify diet without losing flavor.

- Psilakis, Michael (2009). How to Roast a Lamb: New Greek Classic Cooking. Barbara Kafka (contributor). Little, Brown. ISBN 9780316071734.
- Psilakis, Michael (2017). Live to Eat: Cooking the Mediterranean Way. New York City, NY: Little, Brown. ISBN 9780316308205.
