= Christopher Booth (disambiguation) =

Sir Christopher Booth (1924–2012) was a British clinician and medical historian.

Christopher Booth may also refer to:

- Chris Booth (born 1948), New Zealand sculptor
- Christopher Saint Booth (born 1960), British-Canadian filmmaker composer

== See also ==
- Christopher Boothe, fictional character in Passions
