= Sichuan House =

Restaurant in San Antonio, Texas, U.S.

- Interactive map of Sichuan House

Restaurant information
- Location: 3505 Wurzbach Road, San Antonio, Texas, 78238, United States
- Coordinates: 29°28′18″N 98°37′25″W

Sichuan House is a restaurant in San Antonio, Texas, United States. It has appeared on Diners, Drive-Ins and Dives.

== See also ==
- List of Diners, Drive-Ins and Dives episodes
