= Guy Off the Hook =

- Genre: Cooking show
- Created by: Food Network
- Starring: Guy Fieri
- Country of origin: United States
- No. of seasons: 1
- No. of episodes: 6

Production
- Running time: 30 minutes

Original release
- Network: Food Network
- Release: September 14 – October 19, 2008

Guy Off the Hook is a television series which began airing on Food Network in September 2008. The show is hosted by Guy Fieri and closely follows the format of shows such as Paula's Party and Emeril Live. The show is taped in front of a studio audience, which Fieri often engages. The food presented is similar to the California cuisine type dishes Fieri favors on Guy's Big Bite.
