= Guy's Ranch Kitchen =

American reality cooking show

- Genre: Reality; Cooking show
- Starring: Guy Fieri
- Country of origin: United States
- Original language: English

Production
- Executive producer: Guy Fieri
- Running time: 60 Minutes

Original release
- Network: Food Network

Guy's Ranch Kitchen is an American reality cooking show hosted by Guy Fieri on Food Network.
