= Santa Cruz Diner =

Diner in Santa Cruz, California

Restaurant information
- Established: 1998
- Owner: Larry Ring
- Food type: American, Vietnamese
- Location: 909 Ocean Street, Santa Cruz, California, United States
- Website: santacruzdiner.com

Santa Cruz Diner is a diner in Santa Cruz, California. Founded by Larry Ring in 1998, it serves American and Vietnamese cuisine.

== Description ==
Santa Cruz Diner combines East coast diner cuisine with Asian dishes.

== History ==
Santa Cruz Diner was founded by Larry Ring in 1998.

== Reception ==
In 2009, Santa Cruz Diner was featured on the 7th season of Diners, Drive-Ins and Dives and again on its 21st season in 2014.
