= Guy's Family Road Trip =

- Genre: Reality; Cooking
- Starring: Guy Fieri
- Country of origin: United States
- Original language: English
- No. of seasons: 1
- No. of episodes: 5

Production
- Executive producer: Guy Fieri

Original release
- Network: Food Network
- Release: 2017

Guy's Family Road Trip is an American reality-based cooking television show hosted by Guy Fieri on Food Network.
