= Marsh Mokhtari =

US-based British TV host and actor

- Born: Date of birth: May 26, 1975 (age 51); United Kingdom

Marsh Mokhtari (born May 26, 1975) is a US-based British TV host, actor and producer.

== Career ==
His TV credits include hosting Extreme Chef on Food Network, host of Perilous Journeys on National Geographic Channel and several soap-opera appearances as Chris Boothe in 2006 on Passions and as Carson MacDonald in 2007 on The Young and The Restless.

Mokhtari and his wife, Jan, started Golden State Distillery which produces Gray Whale Gin. A percentage of the sales of the gin goes toward environmental causes.

== Personal life ==
Mokhtari and his wife have two daughters.
