= Marc Murphy (chef) =

American restaurateur (born c. 1969)

- Born: 1969 (age 56–57); Milan, Italy
- Education: Institute of Culinary Education
- Occupations: Chef, restaurateur, TV personality

Marc Murphy (born c. 1969 in Milan, Italy) is an American executive chef, restaurateur and television food personality.

== Career ==
Murphy graduated from Fryeburg Academy in 1988 and attended school at the Institute of Culinary Education in New York. He began his culinary career as a line cook at Prix Fixe in New York. By the mid-1990s, he was a sous-chef at Layla in New York and in 1996, became the executive chef at Cellar in the Sky, also in New York. From 1997 to 2000, he was the co-owner and executive chef of La Fourchette. In 2000, he also became the executive chef at Chinoiserie as well as the partner and co-owner of Le Couteau.

=== Restaurants ===
In March 2004, Murphy opened his first solo enterprise, Landmarc, in Tribeca. Over the next fifteen years, his restaurants expanded to include: Ditch Plains in the West Village (2006) and on the Upper West Side (2010–2014), Landmarc in the Time Warner Center (2007–2019), Kingside at the Viceroy Hotel (2013–2020), and Grey Salt at the Seminole Hard Rock Hotel and Casino Tampa in 2015.

In 2022, Murphy opened MM Kitchen Studio, a private event space in the former Tribeca location of Landmarc. In 2024, he launched Marc179, a recurring pop-up dining series held in the same space, featuring rotating guest chefs and limited-run menus.

=== Media ===
Murphy has served in a regular role as a judge on Chopped, and has made appearances on Iron Chef America, Guy's Grocery Games, Beat Bobby Flay, Unique Eats, The Best Thing I Ever Ate, The Best Thing I Ever Made, Rachael Ray and Today, among others. He is the president of the Manhattan chapter of the New York State Restaurant Association. In 2012, Murphy joined the United States Department of State's Diplomatic Culinary Partnership, where he takes part in public diplomacy programs that engage foreign audiences abroad as well as those visiting the United States. Murphy's debut cookbook, Season with Authority: Confident Home Cooking was released in April 2015.

He launched a podcast, Food 360 with Marc Murphy on June 6, 2019, in collaboration with HowStuffWorks.

== Personal life ==
The son of a "globetrotting" diplomat, Murphy lived all over the world before the age of 12, in cities such as Milan, Paris, Rome, Genoa, and Washington, D.C. He says this served as an excellent education in French and Italian cooking. He opened his restaurant with his wife Pamela Schein, and resides with her and their two children, in New York City.

In a question and answer interview with The New York Times, Murphy has also attributed his cooking influences to his mother and grandparents, as he has recounted experiences of enjoying leg of lamb and ratatouille in the south of France. He has also credited French chef Jean-Louis Palladin's first cookbook for having the biggest impact on him, as well as the "strength" and "leadership" of Winston Churchill's My Early Life.

== See also ==
- Chopped (TV series)
