= David Ruggerio =

American chef, author and television personality

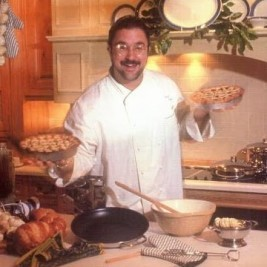
- Born: Sabatino Antonino Gambino; 26 June 1962 (age 64); Brooklyn, New York, USA
- Culinary career
- Cooking style: French, Italian
- Website: davidruggerio.com

David Ruggerio (born Sabatino Antonino Gambino; June 26, 1962, in Brooklyn, USA) is an American chef, author, and television personality. Son of Saverio Erasmo Gambino and Constance Lazzarino, he became famous in the food world during the 1990s. Ruggerio honed his culinary skills in France at several of the country's leading restaurants, among them, the Hôtel Le Negresco with Jacques Maximin; Moulin de Mougins with Roger Vergé; L'Auberge du Pont de Collonges with Paul Bocuse and Les Prés d'Eugénie with Michel Guérard.

== Biography ==
David Ruggerio was born on June 26, 1962, as Sabatino Antonino Gambino, son of Saverio Erasmo Gambino, a Sicilian-born cousin of Carlo Gambino.

His rise to fame began as the chef at the legendary New York eatery, La Caravelle at age twenty-five. At the same time, Ruggerio was a part of the crew of Gambino capo Carmine Lombardozzi, known as the "King of Wall Street" for his stock pump and dump schemes. Lombardozzi had a rule that all his crew had to take legitimate day jobs to deter suspicion from law enforcement, which led to Ruggerio taking a job in the kitchen at La Caravelle, then one of the top French restaurants in the city.

He went on to take command of Pierre Cardin's New York outpost of Maxim's de Paris where he garnered three stars from the New York Times. He then took his talents to the iconic Park Avenue restaurant, Le Chantilly. Here he gained national acclaim by again receiving three stars from the New York Times and being lauded over in an article by legendary writer Gael Greene entitled "Miracle on 57th Street".

In a 2022 Vanity Fair interview, Ruggerio claimed that from an early age, he was an active member of the Gambino crime family, taking part in various crimes such as extortion, loan-sharking, truck hijacking, bookmaking, heroin dealing, and murder. Ruggerio said that in March 1978, he helped Onorato torture and murder a 56-year-old Genovese and Colombo associate named Pasquale 'Paddy Mac' Macchirole at a tire repair garage in Yonkers, New York. They left Macchirole's corpse in a car trunk in Brooklyn. Contemporary reporting confirms that police found Macchirole's body in March 1978. "The body of a reputed organized-crime figure, once accused of extorting money from a prominent Queens nightclub owner who was later murdered, was found stuffed in the trunk of a rented car early yesterday in the Canarsie section of Brooklyn." March 24, 1978 NYT.

== Media personality ==
Ruggerio starred in a PBS cooking series entitled, "Little Italy with David Ruggerio." He later went on to star in his own series on Food Network entitled, "Ruggerio to Go."

== Legal history ==
On November 3, 1998, David Ruggerio was charged with stealing $190,000 from a credit card company by falsifying credit card receipts for payment, in one case by as much as $30,000. He falsified credit card payments by inflating the gratuities left by 26 customers at his restaurant.

On March 12, 1999, he admitted to the charges and paid more than $100,000 in restitution to a credit card company, spent five years on probation and performed 500 hours of community service. Due to this, Food Network debated keeping his show on the air, but eventually decided to cancel it. The network had produced dozens of episodes and spent a small fortune to market it.

Ruggerio subsequently attempted to work in the culinary industry again.

On March 24, 2022, in a Vanity Fair article, Ruggerio claimed to have been an active member of Gambino crime family from 1977 to 2014.

== Bibliography ==
- Ruggerio, David; Acevedo, Melanie (1997). Little Italy Cookbook. New York: Artisan. ISBN 1885183542.
- Ruggerio, David; McEvoy, Maura (2000). David Ruggerio's Italian Kitchen: Family Recipes from the Old Country. Artisan. ISBN 1579651151.
- Ruggerio, David (2019). David Ruggerio's A Wistful Tale of Gods, Men, and Monsters. Black Rose Writing. ISBN 9781684333790.
- Ruggerio, David (2020). Say Goodbye and Goodnight. Black Rose Writing. ISBN 978-1-68433-493-3.
- Ruggerio, David (November 24, 2020). A Prison Without Locks. Texas: Black Rose Writing. p. 215. ISBN 978-1684336203.
- Ruggerio, David (October 21, 2021). A Tomato Grows in Brooklyn. Texas: Black Rose Writing. p. 252. ISBN 9781684338795. OCLC 1273670275.
