= Chris Boothe =

- Passions character
- Adrian Wilson as Chris Boothe
- Portrayed by: Adrian Wilson; Marsh Mokhtari (2006; temporary)
- Duration: 2005–07
- First appearance: August 18, 2005
- Last appearance: August 13, 2007
- Created by: James E. Reilly
In-universe information
- Other names: Greg Walton
- Occupation: Photographer
- Spouse: Maureen Preston (??-2005); Sheridan Crane (2006–07)
- Children: James Boothe

Chris Boothe is a fictional character from the NBC-DirecTV soap opera, Passions, portrayed by Adrian Wilson.

== Character's background ==
Chris, who is a photographer, came to Harmony to cover the earthquake and tsunami that had ravaged the town. While staying at the bed and breakfast, he met and fell in love with Sheridan who had been taking care of his missing son James. Due to mob ties, Christopher had been in the Witness Protection Program but has since paid off his debt to the mob.

Chris came to town shortly after the tsunami, and devastated Sheridan when he told her he was the father of the little boy she had grown attached to. Sheridan initially believed that he was another of Alistair's thugs, hired to destroy her, but Chris was finally able to convince her he was in the witness protection program. He and Maureen Preston had been married with young James but he (then known as Greg) had been too interested in making money, in part to make up for his own childhood with divorced parents who were never around. He wanted James to have everything he didn't have. Chris explained his story to Sheridan and asked her to look after James should anything ever happen to him, because Maureen's parents weren't the type of people he wanted his son to grow up with—they were a lot like Sheridan's family, and she agreed to fight them if anything happened to Chris and they tried to take James. Unfortunately, the goons after Chris caught up with him in Harmony and the FBI interceded, insisting that Chris and his son had to get out of town. He initially refused, but finally agreed, for Sheridan and James' safety. A last minute confrontation between the FBI and the men after Chris gave Chris a new lease on life, and a new chance to start a life in Harmony. He offered to leave Harmony, worried that James' presence reminded Sheridan too much of her loss (Marty), but Sheridan wanted him to stay.

After a few dates, the two became lovers. The two eventually went to Hawaii together in search of Sheridan's son Marty and, while there, decided to get married. Shortly after, Chris saved a man from a house fire and the two were shocked to learn that it was Luis. Luis was eventually told the truth about Sheridan and Chris' marriage, and Chris offered to let Sheridan go, but she told Chris that she was staying with him—and that she was pregnant with his baby. Shortly afterwards, haunted by Marty's death, Sheridan suffered a miscarriage on July 20, 2006. On August, Chris was shot by Spike for not following Alistair's orders, Sheridan is now taking care of him.

Spike has recently revealed that Chris is not who he says he is. He was hired by Alistair to pretend to be Mark's birth father. He was also hired to get Sheridan to fall in love with him, and later, to marry her before she was reunited with Luis. He was never married to Maureen (what happened to James's real father is unknown).

Chris has recently taken a job at Crane Industries in order to help Spike embezzle funds.

After months of Chris wondering if Sheridan loved Luis more than him, he learned the truth when Sheridan shouted on the witness stand at Luis and Miguel's trial that Luis is the only man she would ever love. Chris left Sheridan to go out of the country that day, taking James with him. When Sheridan later visited him to talk about James' custody, Chris told her that he wouldn't be surprised if she didn't even shed a tear when James left. He also said that he will not let James wake up one day and realize that he is only a replacement for her deceased son Marty. He warned that he will not let her get full custody over James, and he will fight her in court if he has to.

However, since Sheridan's first husband Antonio Lopez-Fitzgerald, was turned out to be alive after being presumed dead for four years, Chris and Sheridan's marriage turns out to be invalid.

== See also ==
- Crane family
