= Extreme Chef =

- Genre: Reality competition
- Presented by: Marsh Mokhtari
- Country of origin: United States
- Original language: English
- No. of seasons: 2
- No. of episodes: 13

Production
- Production companies: Smart Dog Productions; Valencia Productions

Original release
- Network: Food Network
- Release: June 26, 2011 – September 13, 2012

Extreme Chef is a reality competition television program on Food Network. It first aired on June 26, 2011, and is hosted by Marsh Mokhtari. The second season premiered on August 16, 2012.

== Format ==
Seven chefs test their culinary abilities, as well as their physical prowess and mental toughness. The challenges are judged by a rotating panel of judges. The winner takes home the $50,000 grand prize.

== Episodes ==
=== Season 1 ===
No.	Title	Original release date
1	"Ghost Town"	June 26, 2011
2	"Rock the Block"	June 30, 2011
3	"Mountain Chefs"	July 7, 2011
4	"Beach Blow Out"	July 14, 2011
5	"Ice House"	July 21, 2011
6	"Mexican Showdown"	July 28, 2011
7	"Survive the Farm"	August 4, 2011
8	"Wedding Crashers"	August 11, 2011

=== Season 2 ===
No.	Title	Original release date
1	"Doomsday Survival"	August 16, 2012
2	"Coast Guard Cook-Off"	August 23, 2012
3	"Desert Survival"	August 30, 2012
4	"Off to Thailand"	September 6, 2012
5	"The $50,000 Bite The $50,000 Bite"	September 13, 2012
