= Cooking Simulator =

2019 video game

- Developer: Big Cheese Studio
- Publishers: PlayWay S.A. (Windows); Forever Entertainment (Switch); Big Cheese Studio (PS4, XBO)
- Engine: Unity
- Platforms: Microsoft Windows; Nintendo Switch; Android; Xbox One; PlayStation 4
- Release: Microsoft Windows: WW: 6 June 2019; Nintendo Switch: WW: 14 May 2020; Xbox One: WW: 14 August 2020; Android: WW: 20 October 2020; PlayStation 4: EU/AU: 20 May 2021; NA: 8 June 2021
- Genres: Simulation, cooking
- Mode: Single-player

Cooking Simulator is a simulation cooking game developed by Polish team Big Cheese Studio and published by PlayWay S.A. on 6 June 2019 for Microsoft Windows. The Nintendo Switch version was released on 14 May 2020, published on the system by Forever Entertainment. The Xbox One version was released on 14 August 2020. A mobile port, titled Cooking Simulator Mobile, launched on Android devices on 20 October 2020. It is available on iOS in a few countries, and the worldwide release is available for pre-register by PlayWay S.A. The PlayStation 4 version released on 20 May 2021 exclusively in Europe and Australia, and on 8 June 2021 in North America.

== Gameplay ==
Cooking Simulator uses a physics integrated engine and cooking mechanics to simulate a realistic cooking experience. In its current state, the game allows the player to prepare over 80 recipes using more than 140 ingredients. There are various game modes including Career Mode, Sandbox Mode, Cooking School, Pizza, Cakes and Cookies, Shelter, Leaderboard Challenge, Winter Holidays, and SUPERHOT Challenge. In Career Mode, the players take control over a kitchen while progressively earning fame and experience by serving dishes according to orders. A fee is automatically charged each time the ingredients are picked up from the shelf. The goal is to reach the fifth Fame Star. Sandbox Mode offers a fully equipped kitchen with no time limits. Cooking School is a series of tutorials explaining all the game mechanics. Leaderboard Challenge is a game mode in which players compete by trying to prepare a single dish according to a recipe, with each dish having its own scoreboard. Winter Holidays offers a new kitchen and allows to serve a dinner to a number of guests by preparing dishes containing requested ingredients.

In the Pizza DLC, the player works in a pizzeria and has the task of preparing different pizzas with different doughs and toppings. The Cakes and Cookies DLC allows the player to prepare a wide range of cakes, tarts and cookies in a pastry shop.

The SUPERHOT Challenge was added in a free update on February 25, 2020, inspired by SUPERHOT to celebrate its fourth anniversary on Steam. It modifies the appearance of products, utensils and kitchen and introduces a new mechanic that slows down the time when the player's not moving.

In the Shelter DLC, set after a nuclear holocaust in the 1980s, the player must ration and prepare food for their bunker, Sector 12, while searching for their lost family. The mode centers around the ability to go out into the wasteland to trade meals for favors, hunt mutants for meat, and gather radioactive plants as ingredients.

Some versions of the game such as the Nintendo Switch version have features removed, such as some DLCs.

== Reception ==
Reception

Aggregate score
Aggregator	Score
Metacritic	64/100

Review scores
Publication	Score
GameStar	65%
PC Games (DE)	7/10

Due to its initial flaws, Cooking Simulator received mixed reviews from review outlets. It scored 64/100 on Metacritic based on 4 reviews. PC Games appreciated the game's graphics, various recipes while pointing out difficult controls, unengaging career mode and performance issues. GameStar pointed out unlockable recipes and perks, tutorial, dish review system and a small number of ingredients, recipes and utensils as pros. The cons included difficult controls, repetitiveness, lack of difficulty levels, physics bugs and no replay value in career mode. In their review, Screen Rant stated that the game's challenging timing and controls were fun in short sessions and frustrating in the long run.
