= Joan's on Third =

Food store and restaurant in Los Angeles

Coordinates: 34.0727°N 118.3718°W

- Type: Private
- Industry: restaurants catering retail food sales
- Founded: Los Angeles, California, USA (1995; 31 years ago)
- Founder: Joan McNamara and Carol McNamara Glass
- Headquarters: 8350 West Third St. Los Angeles, California 90048; United States
- Owners: Joan McNamara, Carol McNamara Glass, and Susie Hastings
- Website: joansonthird.com

Joan's on Third is a specialty food marketplace and restaurant located on Third Street in Los Angeles, California, USA. Joan's is situated in an area popular with Angelenos for its eating and shopping establishments, located between the Beverly Center on La Cienega Boulevard and Farmer's Market at the Grove on Fairfax Avenue.

A family business owned and operated by chef Joan McNamara and her children, Carol McNamara Glass and Susie Hastings, Joan's started out as a catering operation running out of a storefront on Third St. As demand grew, McNamara expanded her business to include a small café and marketplace. The store tripled its size after a decade of operation, and the restaurant now includes a full menu for breakfast, lunch and dinner. The shop in the same space sells artisan cheeses, prepared foods, baked goods, desserts and non-perishables.

Its popularity and success has grown on the strength of its products and good reviews in multiple publications and media outlets. It also has a reputation as a hip gathering spot frequented by Hollywood celebrities and foodies, such as Robert Duvall, Jake Gyllenhaal and Moon Zappa.

When the lines get too long and customers are waiting, Joan has been known to rush out with a tray of cupcakes for everyone.

== History ==
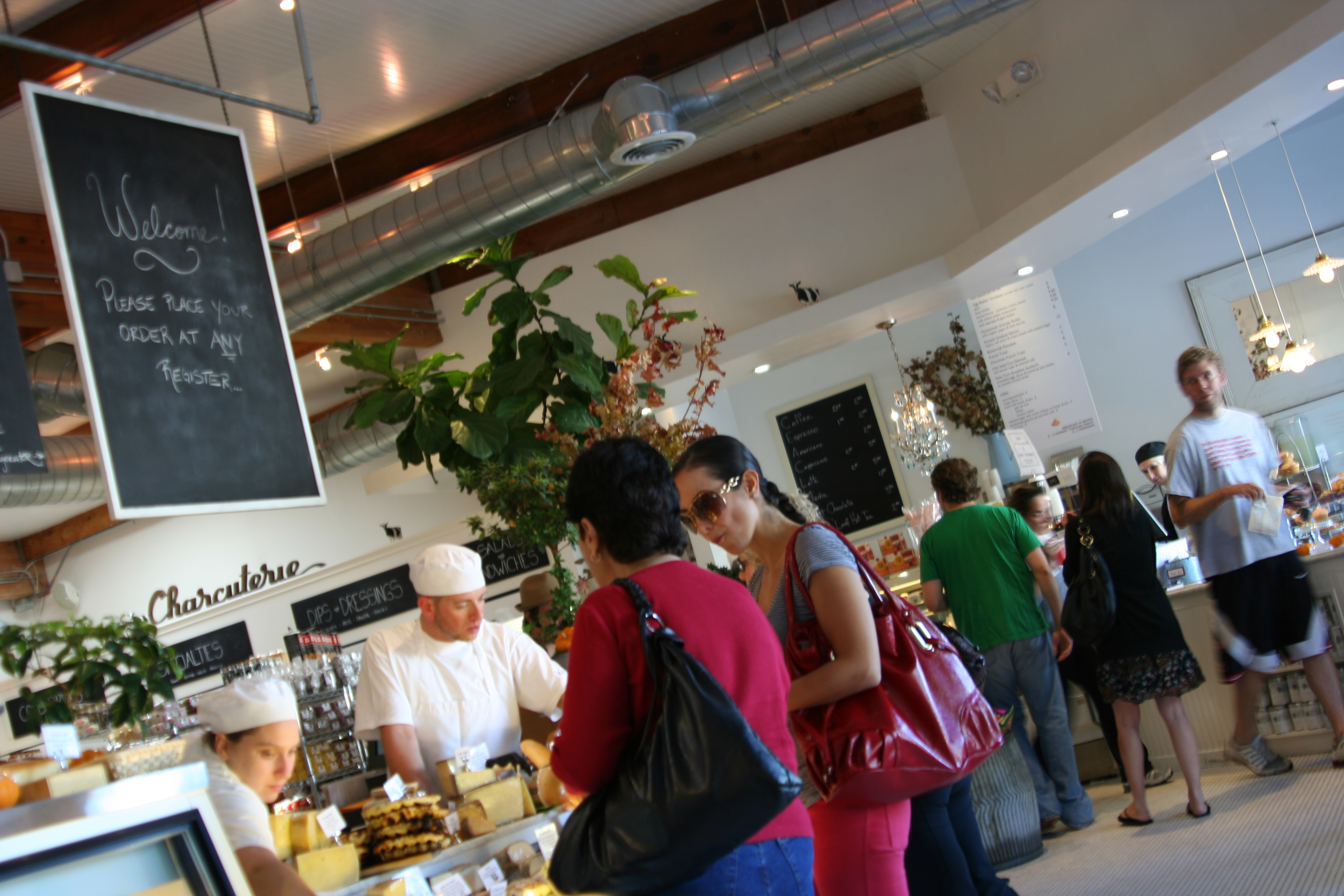
Interior of Joan's on Third, the cheese counter

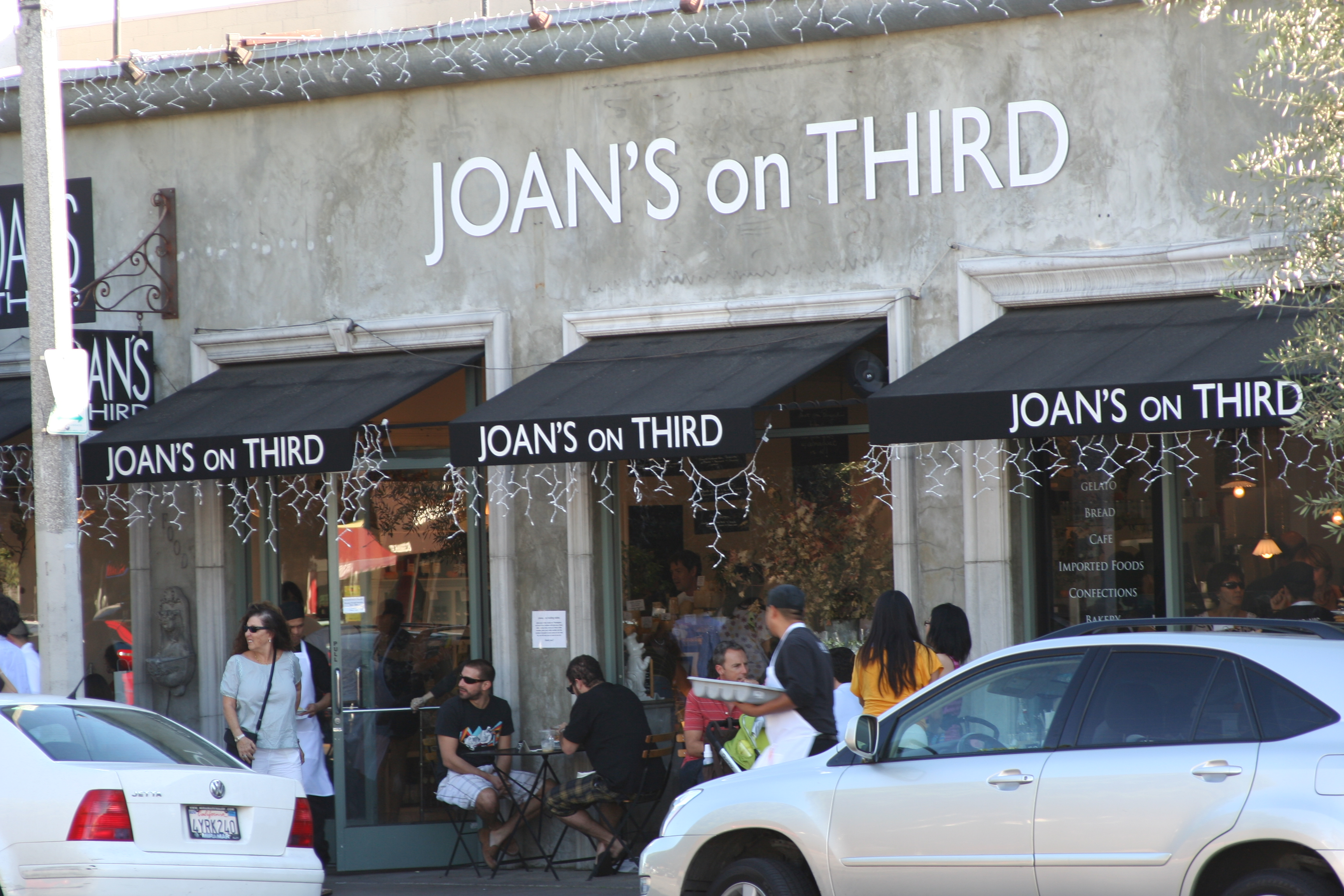
Joan's on Third exterior

Joan McNamara, namesake of Joan's, is a chef originally from New York, where she ran a cooking school and her own restaurant before moving to L.A. She opened Joan's in 1995 as a catering company located in a storefront on West Third St. Joan's two daughters, Carol, a graduate of the Cornell University School of Hotel Administration, and Susie, an alumna of the Georgetown University School of Business, also run the business, with Carol running the Catering and Special Events arm of the business, and Susie overseeing Operations. San Francisco chef Chester Hastings came to work at the store in 1997 and eventually married Susie McNamara.

In 1998 Joan's expanded into an adjacent storefront on Third Street, helping to realize Ms. MacNamara's "lifelong dream of opening a gourmet foods marketplace and café." Another major expansion took place in 2007 that helped expand the scope of the company's operations by tripling the floor space of the market. Beside being a market, Joan's is also a full-service restaurant providing table service and take-out meals for it patrons. Often very busy, Joan's has been described as being reminiscent of some famous New York restaurants, including Zabar's, Dean & DeLuca, and Fairway Market.

Joan's has a full-service cheese counter, dessert bar, assortment of chocolates; and a food counter where sandwiches, ready-to-eat foods, salads and snacks are offered. An assortment of dry goods and refrigerated products are also offered. The owners travel extensively to source products.

== Reception ==
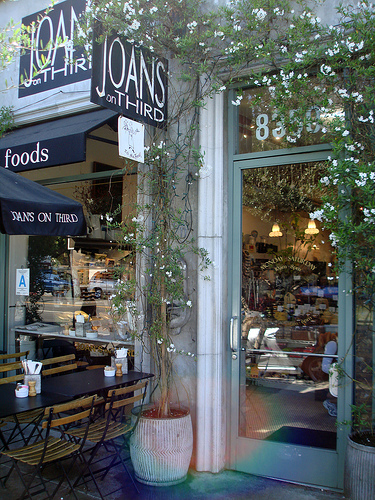
Front façade of Joan's on Third

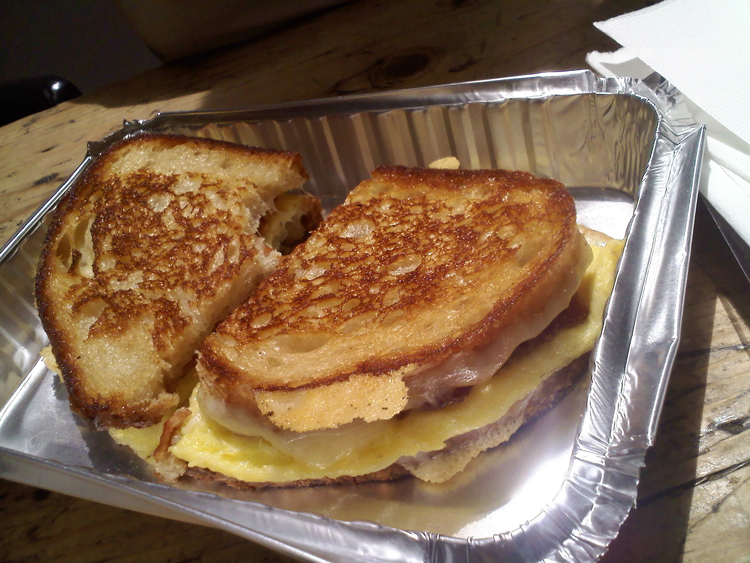
New York Breakfast Sandwich

The restaurant has generally been given favorable reviews in several publications and news outlets, including the New York Times, CNN and Time magazine. A Los Angeles Times review noted that Joan's is the "rare in LA specialty foods store" that "stocks essentials -- salt-cured anchovies sold by the ounce, capers under salt, ricotta cheese, fleur de sel (a specialty sea salt from France), and imported De Cecco brand pasta" and "a small selection of carefully chosen cheeses, such as locally made burrata, English Cotswold, or a truffle-infused Boschetto."

While the Los Angeles Times reviewer stated that the food was "above average", she also noted that "It [the restaurant] is somewhat disorganized. When there's a rush (i.e., more than a handful of customers), the servers behind the counter can sometimes get flustered, and it seems to take longer than it should to put together an order." The Zagat Survey lists Joan's as a Top Bakery in the US and the customer reviews posted on the website are mostly positive, with one poster calling Joan's offerings "fun and delicious, albeit expensive, snacks, cheeses, etc."; however a couple of other commentators stated it is "overrated" and "overpriced".

The Los Angeles Daily News Food Editor on LA.com noted the crowded conditions in Joan's and warned that "At busy times, it can be difficult to snag a table - and the frenetic pace and wait to order at the counter may not appeal to some. Parking is sometimes difficult to come by."

=== Celebrities ===
The company has been noted as being popular among several celebrities and gourmands who live in the southlands of California. Writing for The New York Times, Moon Zappa described Joan's on Third as her favorite Los Angeles eatery. The restaurant is also a favorite of Jake Gyllenhaal, who has been seen dining there with ex-girlfriend Kirsten Dunst.

== See also ==
- Bristol Farms
- Whole Foods Market
- La Brea Bakery
- The Grove's Farmer's Market
