= Pine State Biscuits =

Restaurant chain based in Portland, Oregon, U.S.

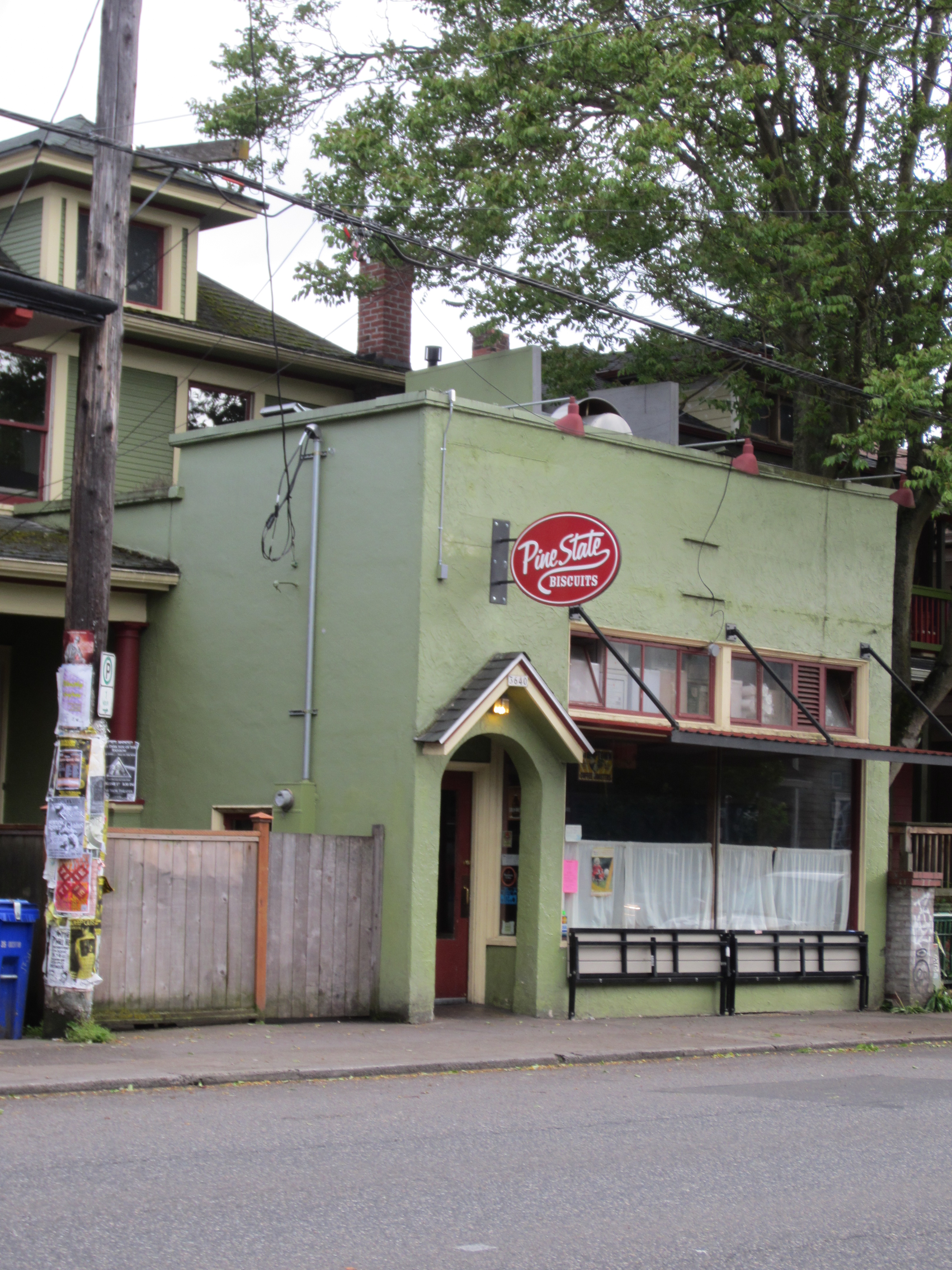
- One of the Portland, Oregon restaurants in 2012

Restaurant information
- Established: 2006
- Location: United States
- Website: pinestatebiscuits.com

Pine State Biscuits is a chain of breakfast restaurants based in Portland, Oregon. Established in 2006, there are four locations in Portland plus one in Reno, Nevada, as of 2018. Food & Wine included Pine State Biscuits in a 2017 list of the best biscuits in the United States.

== Locations ==
The Rose Quarter location opened in 2014.

== See also ==
- List of Diners, Drive-Ins and Dives episodes
- List of restaurant chains in the United States
