= Guy Fieri =

American television personality (born 1968)

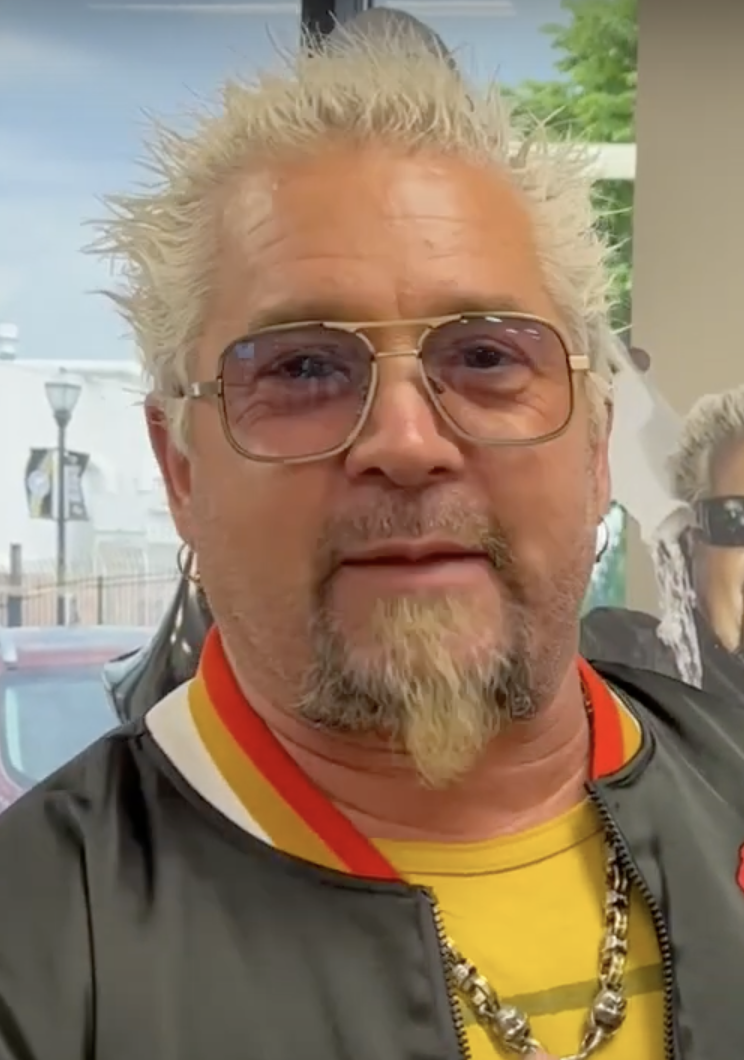
- Fieri in June 2023
- Born: Guy Ramsay Ferry; January 22, 1968 (age 58); Columbus, Ohio, U.S.
- Education: University of Nevada, Las Vegas (BS)
- Spouse: Lori Brisson (m. 1995)
- Children: 2
- Culinary career
- Current restaurants
- Guy's American Kitchen and Bar (licensed, multiple cities); Guy's Burger Joint on Carnival Cruise Lines (licensed); Guy Fieri's Vegas Kitchen & Bar (licensed)
- Television shows
- Guy's Big Bite; Diners, Drive-Ins and Dives; Ultimate Recipe Showdown; Guy Off the Hook; Minute to Win It; Guy's Grocery Games; Guy's Family Road Trip
- Guy Fieri's voice Recorded February 2014

Guy Ramsay Fieri ([fiˈɛɾi]; né Ferry; born January 22, 1968) is an American restaurateur, author, and television presenter. He co-owned three now-defunct restaurants in California. He licenses his name to restaurants in cities all over the world, and is known for hosting various television series on the Food Network. In 2010, The New York Times reported that Fieri had become the "face of the network", bringing an "element of rowdy, mass-market culture to American food television" and that his "prime-time shows attract more male viewers than any others on the network".

== Early life and education ==
Fieri was born Guy Ramsay Ferry on January 22, 1968 in Columbus, Ohio, the son of Penelope Anne (née Price; born 1944) and Lewis James Ferry (1942–2024). Fieri grew up in Ferndale in rural Humboldt County, California. While attending Ferndale High School, he was a foreign exchange student in Chantilly, France. During this trip, he developed his interest in food and cooking.

Fieri attended the University of Nevada, Las Vegas (UNLV), and graduated with a Bachelor of Science degree in hotel management in 1990.

== Career ==
Fieri began his association with food in grade school in Ferndale, by first selling pretzels from his "Awesome Pretzel" bicycle cart that he had built with his father at age 10, and later washing dishes to finance a trip to France to study. Upon returning, he worked at the restaurant at the Red Lion Inn in Eureka, California, until he went to UNLV for college.

Soon after graduating from college, he worked as manager of Parker's Lighthouse, a restaurant in Long Beach, California. After three years in southern California, he became the district manager of Louise's Trattoria, managing six locations along with recruiting and training for the restaurants.

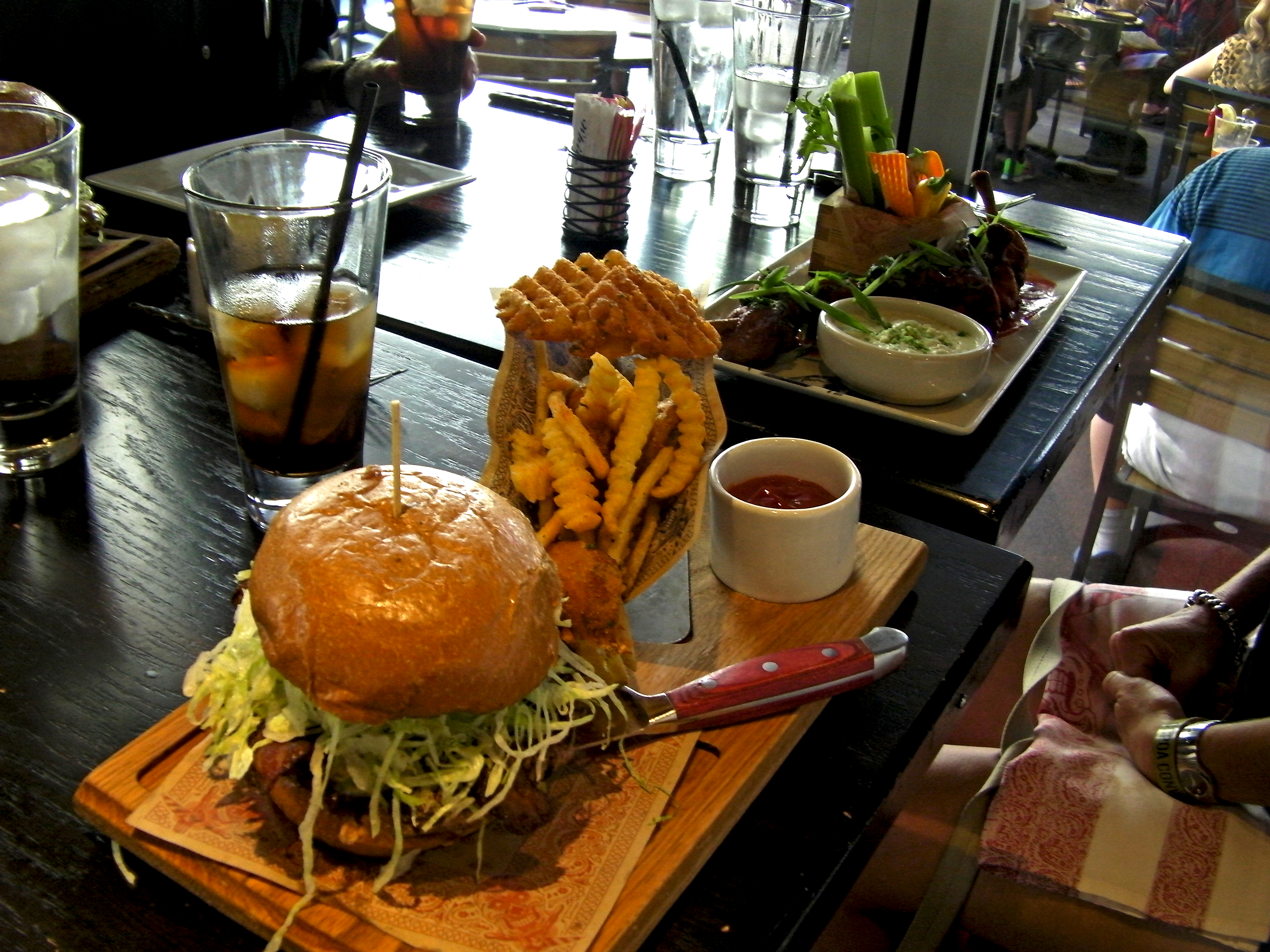
A burger and chicken wings from Guy Fieri's Vegas Kitchen & Bar on the Las Vegas Strip

=== Restaurants ===
In late 1996, Fieri and business partner Steve Gruber opened Johnny Garlic's, a "California Pasta Grill" in Santa Rosa, California. A second location opened in Windsor in 1999, a third in Petaluma in 2000 or 2001 (since closed), and a fourth in Roseville in late 2008. They developed Tex Wasabi's (barbecue and sushi) in 2003 in Santa Rosa, adding a second location in Arden-Arcade near Sacramento in 2007 (which was rebranded as Johnny Garlic's and then closed). An additional Johnny Garlic's was opened in Dublin, California in 2011.

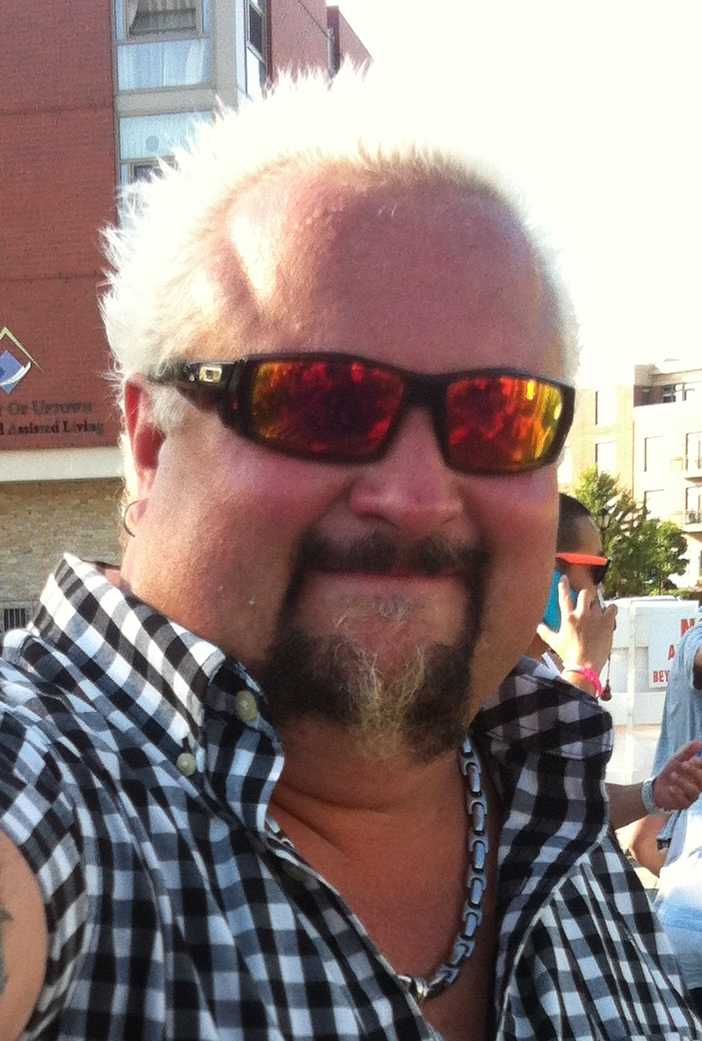
Fieri in July 2013

Fieri's first New York City restaurant, Guy's American Kitchen and Bar, opened in 2012 to brutal New York Times coverage by Pete Wells that Larry Olmsted of Forbes called "the most scathing review in the history of the New York Times", and "likely the most widely read restaurant review ever." Fieri, for his part, accused Wells, the nation's highest profile reviewer, of using Fieri's fame as a platform for advancing his own prestige. The restaurant's location in the highly trafficked Times Square enabled it to appear on Restaurant Business's list of the top 100 independent restaurants as ranked by sales for four years in a row. It closed at the end of 2017. In 2011, Fieri partnered with Carnival Cruise lines creating Guy's Burger Joint to sell Fieri's burgers fleet-wide. As of October 2017, there were 19 restaurants on Carnival's cruise ships, including some serving beer-and-BBQ, Guy's Pig & Anchor Smokehouse Brewhouse.

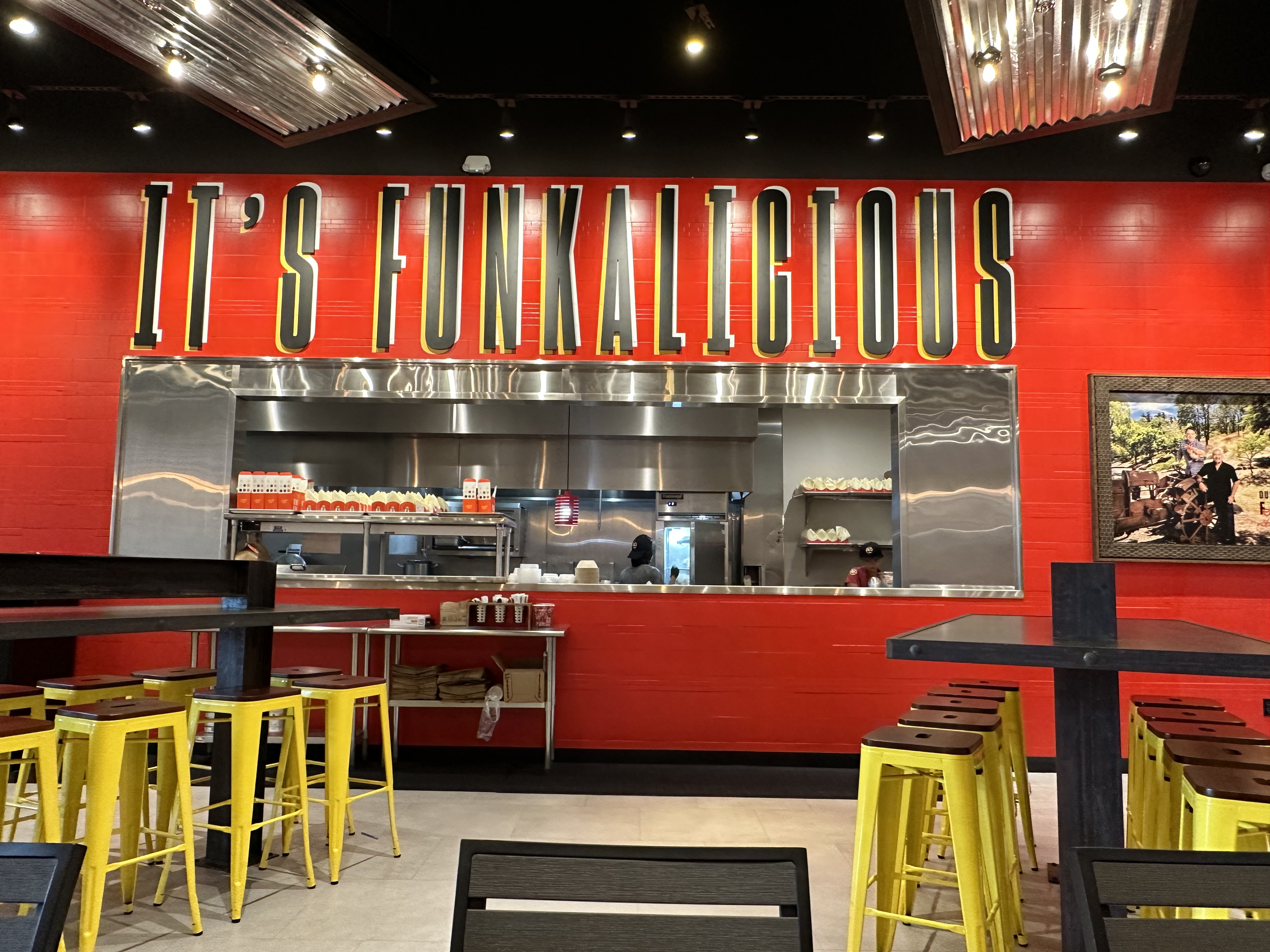
Interior of a "Chicken Guy" restaurant in Miami, 2023

In April 2014, Guy Fieri's Vegas Kitchen and Bar opened on the Las Vegas Strip in Paradise, Nevada. In 2015, Guy Fieri's Baltimore Kitchen & Bar opened in Baltimore's Horseshoe Casino. In 2018, Fieri collaborated with Planet Hollywood founder Robert Earl to open fast-food chicken sandwich shop Chicken Guy! at Disney Springs in Walt Disney World.

In 2021, Fieri opened Guy Fieri's Flavortown Kitchen, a delivery-only restaurant.

=== Television ===
After winning the second season of The Next Food Network Star on April 23, 2006, Fieri was awarded a six-episode commitment for his own cooking show on Food Network. Guy's Big Bite premiered on June 25, 2006, with the most recent episode airing on November 16, 2016.

Diners, Drive-Ins and Dives, his second series, premiered in April 2007 (a one-hour special aired in November 2006), with Fieri traveling the country visiting local eateries. The New York Times called the series "not a cooking show as much as a carefully engineered reality show". Ultimate Recipe Showdown, co-hosted with Marc Summers, debuted on February 17, 2008, and aired for three seasons. On September 14, 2008, Guy Off the Hook debuted on Food Network. The special studio audience show aired through the end of 2008, but the extra cost of staging an audience show did not pan out and the concept was discontinued. For Thanksgiving 2008, Fieri hosted a one-hour special titled Guy's Family Feast. He used the "Guy Off the Hook" set for the special, which was broadcast live, on November 28, 2008. He appeared on other Food Network programs including Dinner: Impossible in 2007 and 2009, Paula's Party, Ace of Cakes, and The Best Thing I Ever Ate. In December 2009, NBC named Fieri as the host of the game show Minute to Win It, which premiered in March 2010 and aired for two seasons. On May 13, 2012, NBC announced that the game show would not be renewed for a third season, citing high production costs and low ratings.

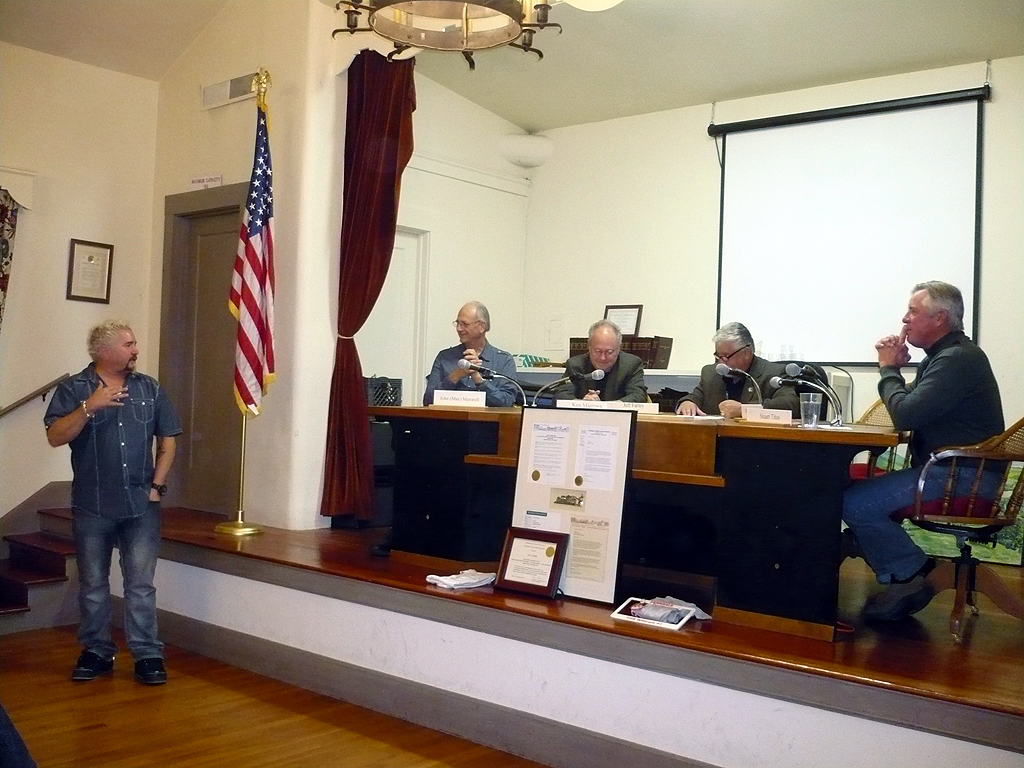
Fieri receives the key to the city of Ferndale from the Ferndale City Council at a special council meeting on November 23, 2012

In January 2012, Fieri was one of the two team captains (along with Rachael Ray) in the Food Network reality series Rachael vs. Guy: Celebrity Cook-Off. A second season of Rachael vs. Guy: Celebrity Cook-Off began airing on Food Network on January 6, 2013. A chef challenge show, Guy's Grocery Games, started on October 27, 2013, on the Food Network. It features a three judge panel and four cooks battling through three rounds of competition. His series, Guy's Family Road Trip, was chosen as the 2017 lead-out show from season 13 of Food Network Star. It previewed on August 13 of that year.

On May 22, 2019 Fieri received a Star on the Hollywood Walk of Fame.

In May 2021, Fieri signed a three-year contract with Food Network worth an estimated $80 million.

=== Advertising ===
Fieri appeared in promotions for Flowmaster, a California-based auto exhaust parts manufacturer. In 2008 and 2009, he was the spokesperson for T.G.I. Friday's. In 2010, he appeared in a commercial for Aflac named "Spicy".

=== Other projects ===
In 2009, Fieri began touring with the Guy Fieri Roadshow, a multi-state food tour that featured some of his fellow Food Network personalities. He appeared in regional Food Network events like the 2012 Atlantic City Food and Wine Festival and the 2012 South Beach Food and Wine Festival, where he officiated at 101 gay weddings. In 2015, Fieri officiated at the wedding of celebrity chef Art Smith at Miami Beach. The wedding, which included 101 same-sex couples, was held to celebrate Florida's Supreme Court lifting the state ban on same-sex marriage. Fieri officiated the weddings in honor of his late sister who was a lesbian.

Fieri owns a vineyard and sells his wine under the label Hunt & Ryde, named after his sons Hunter and Ryder. In response to the COVID-19 pandemic's effect on the restaurant industry in 2020, Fieri and the National Restaurant Association Educational Foundation teamed up to raise money for unemployed restaurant workers through newly created Restaurant Employee Relief Fund. In less than two months over US$20 million was raised.

Fieri is currently producing the off-Broadway run of The Life and Slimes of Marc Summers, starring his friend and former Food Network co-host.

In 2023, Fieri started Guy's Flavortown Tailgate (abbreviated GFT), an annual event in partnership with Medium Rare. Held during the Super Bowl weekend, it offers fans a free tailgating experience featuring food, music, and festivities.

Fieri co-owns Santo Tequila with Sammy Hagar. In 2024, the tequila company was at the center of a large heist where 24,000 bottles of tequila (two truck loads worth $1 million) were stolen.

Fieri is a strategic owner of NASCAR Cup Series team Legacy Motor Club.

== Personal life ==
Fieri met his wife Lori when she came into a restaurant he was managing in Long Beach, California. The couple married in 1995. They live in Santa Rosa with their sons, Hunter and Ryder, and their nephew, Jules. Fieri's sister died in 2011 of metastatic melanoma, and Fieri decided to take care of the 11-year old Jules.

The Fieris bought a home in West Palm Beach, Florida, in 2021.

Ferry changed his surname to Fieri in memory of his paternal grandfather, Giuseppe Fieri, an Italian immigrant who had anglicized his surname to Ferry upon arriving in the United States.

He collects classic American cars, including a 1971 Chevrolet Chevelle, a 1968 Pontiac Firebird, a 1976 Jeep CJ-5, a 1969 Chevrolet Impala SS, and a 1967 Chevrolet C10 pickup.

== Filmography ==
Film
Year	Title	Role	Notes
2014	I Am Evel Knievel	Himself	
2014	The Interview	Himself	
2023	80 for Brady	Himself	
2025	Happy Gilmore 2	Maxi Starter	

Television
Year	Title	Role	Notes
2006	The Next Food Network Star	Himself	Contestant; Season 2
2006–2016	Guy's Big Bite	Himself/host	
2007	Paula's Party	Himself	Episode dated May 18, 2007
2007	All-Star Holiday Dishes	Himself	
2007–present	Diners, Drive-Ins and Dives	Himself/host	
2007–2009	Dear Food Network	Himself/host	5 episodes
2007–2009	Dinner: Impossible	Himself	Season 2 episode 8: "Camp Cookoff: Robert vs. Guy"; Season 7 episode 13: "Robert and Guy's Holiday Havoc"
2008	Phineas and Ferb	Pizza Guy	Voice; Season 3 episode 27: "Sleepwalk Surprise/Sci-Fi Pie Fly"
2008–2010	Ultimate Recipe Showdown	Himself/co-host	
2009	HGTV Showdown	Himself	Guest consultant Season 3 episode 4: "Clash of the Kitchens"
2009	Garage Mahal	Himself	Season 1 episode 13: "Guy Fieri's Garage"
2009–2011	The Best Thing I Ever Ate	Himself	16 episodes
2010	Ace of Cakes	Himself	Season 9 episode 1: "100 Episodes of Cake"
2010–2011	Minute to Win It	Himself/host	
2011	Guy Fieri's Rock 'n Road Show	Himself	
2011	Bitchin' Kitchen	Himself	Season 2 episode 9: "Xmas Special"
2011	Take Two with Phineas and Ferb	Himself	Season 2 episode 10: "Guy Fieri"
2011	Ridiculousness	Himself	Season 4 episode 18: "Guy Fieri"
2011–2012	The Best Thing I Ever Made	Himself	4 episodes
2012	Restaurant: Impossible	Himself/Groomsman	Season 4: "Wedding Impossible"
2012	Guy Fieri's Family Reunion	Himself	
2012–2014	Rachael vs. Guy: Celebrity Cook-Off	Himself/co-host/mentor	
2013	Guy's Family Cruise	Himself	
2013–present	Guy's Grocery Games	Himself/host	Executive producer
2013–2014	Rachael vs. Guy: Kids Cook-Off	Himself/co-host/mentor	
2015	I Get That a Lot	Himself	Season 1 episode 6: "Rita Ora, Guy Fieri, Kristin Chenoweth, Cody Simpson, Alex Trebek, Aaron Rodgers"
2015–2016	Guilty Pleasures	Himself	4 episodes
2016	Guy & Hunter's European Vacation	Himself	Executive producer
2017	Guy's Family Road Trip	Himself	
2017	Super Southern Eats	Himself	Executive producer
2017	On Your Marc	Himself	
2017–present	Guy's Ranch Kitchen	Himself	
2018	Impractical Jokers	Himself (Cameo)	Episode: Like a Boss
2020–present	Tournament of Champions	Himself/Host	
2021	Guy's Restaurant Reboot	Himself	Livestreamed special
2021–2024	The Great North	Himself	Season 2 episode 9: "From Dusk till Dawn Adventure"; Season 3 episode 6: "Blood Actually Adventure"; Season 4 episode 1 "Bad Speecher Adventure"
2022	Guy's Chance of a Lifetime	Himself	
2022	Guy's All-American Road Trip	Himself	
2025	Robot Chicken: Self Discovery Special	Himself	Voice; Television Special
2025	Tournament of Champions: All-Star Christmas	Himself/host	

Video games
Year	Title	Role	Notes
2011	Minute to Win It	Himself	

== Awards and nominations ==
Year	Award	Nominee / work	Category	Result
2013	Daytime Emmy Awards	Guy Fieri's Family Reunion	Outstanding Special Class Special	Won
2014	Primetime Emmy Awards	Diners, Drive-Ins and Dives	Outstanding Structured Reality Program	Nominated
2015	Primetime Emmy Awards	Diners, Drive-Ins and Dives	Outstanding Structured Reality Program	Nominated
2016	Primetime Emmy Awards	Diners, Drive-Ins and Dives	Outstanding Structured Reality Program	Nominated
2017	Primetime Emmy Awards	Diners, Drive-Ins and Dives	Outstanding Structured Reality Program	Nominated
2017	Daytime Emmy Awards	Guy's Big Bite	Outstanding Culinary Program	Nominated
2017	Daytime Emmy Awards	Guy's Big Bite	Outstanding Lifestyle/Culinary Show Host	Nominated
2018	Daytime Emmy Awards	Guy's Ranch Kitchen	Outstanding Lifestyle/Culinary Show Host	Nominated
2019	Primetime Emmy Awards	Diners, Drive-Ins and Dives	Outstanding Structured Reality Program	Nominated
2019	Hollywood Walk of Fame	Himself	Star	Won
2021	Critics' Choice Real TV Awards	Diners, Drive-Ins and Dives	Male Star of the Year	Nominated
2023	Daytime Emmy Awards	Guy's Ranch Kitchen	Outstanding Lifestyle/Culinary Show Host	Nominated
2024	Daytime Emmy Awards	Guy's All-American Road Trip	Outstanding Travel, Adventure and Nature Program	Nominated

== Books ==
Fieri is the author or co-author of several cookbooks which together were New York Times bestsellers for a total of over 33 weeks.

- Diners, Drive-ins, and Dives: An All-American Road Trip ... with Recipes!. New York: William Morrow. October 2008. ISBN 978-0-06-172488-6.
- More Diners, Drive-ins and Dives: Another Drop-Top Culinary Cruise Through America's Finest and Funkiest. New York: William Morrow. November 2009. ISBN 978-0-061894-56-5.
- Guy Fieri Food: Cookin' It, Livin' It, Lovin' It. New York: William Morrow. May 2011. ISBN 978-0-061894-55-8.
- Diners, Drive-Ins, and Dives: The Funky Finds in Flavortown: America's Classic Joints and Killer Comfort Food. New York: William Morrow. May 2013. ISBN 978-0-062244-65-9.
- Guy on Fire: 130 Recipes for Adventures in Outdoor Cooking. New York: William Morrow. May 2014. ISBN 978-0-062244-71-0.
- Guy Fieri Family Food: Kitchen Tested, Home Approved. New York: William Morrow. October 2016. ISBN 978-0-062244-73-4.

== See also ==
- List of celebrities who own wineries and vineyards
