= Waverley Root =

American journalist

- Root's author photograph from The Food of Italy, 1971
- Born: April 15, 1903; Providence, Rhode Island
- Died: October 31, 1982 (aged 79); Paris, France
- Occupations: Journalist and author
- Notable work: The Food of France; The Food of Italy

Waverley Lewis Root (April 15, 1903 – October 31, 1982) was an American journalist and writer. Root became known as an authority on food with the publication of The Food of France in 1958, "which has never been out of print." Among many other works, he also authored the classic The Food of Italy.

== Early life and education ==
Root was born in Providence, Rhode Island, and raised in Fall River, Massachusetts. He obtained his degree from Tufts College in Medford, Mass.

== Career ==
Root was a news correspondent for over 30 years; in 1969 he retired from daily journalism. He was the Paris correspondent for the Chicago Tribune and then The Washington Post. He was also a columnist for the International Herald Tribune.

His books and writings focused on food, and yet mingled culinary details of the regions he wrote about with historic facts, and literary references.

After graduating from college, he moved to Greenwich Village, New York City.

== Writings ==
Waverley Root became widely known for his writings on food, including:

- The Food of France (1958)
- The Cooking of Italy (1968)
- Paris Dining Guide (1969)
- The Food of Italy (1971)
- Eating in America: A History (1976) – with Richard De Rochemont
- Food, an Authoritative and Visual History and Dictionary of the Foods of the World (1980)

Among his other books are the following:

- The Truth about Wagner (1928)
- The Secret History of the War (1946)
- Winter Sports in Europe (1956)
- The Paris Edition: The Autobiography of Waverley Root, 1927-1934 (1987)

== Family ==
At the time of his death, Root was married to Colette Root. He had a daughter, from his third marriage.

== Death ==
Root died in his sleep at the age of 79. The cause of his death was a pulmonary ailment.
