= Guy's Grocery Games =

American reality cooking show

- Genre: Reality; Cooking; Game show
- Starring: Guy Fieri; Hunter Fieri
- Country of origin: United States
- Original language: English
- No. of seasons: 42
- No. of episodes: 542 (list of episodes)

Production
- Executive producers: Guy Fieri: Brian Lando; Francesco Giuseppe Pace; Devon Williams
- Producers: Bryan Johnson; Sam Perotti
- Running time: 60 minutes
- Production companies: Knuckle Sandwich; Lando Entertainment; Triage Entertainment; Relativity Media

Original release
- Network: Food Network
- Release: October 20, 2013 – present

Guy's Grocery Games (often nicknamed Triple G) is an American reality competition television series hosted by Guy Fieri and his son Hunter on Food Network. Each episode features four chefs competing in a three-round elimination contest, cooking food with ingredients found in a supermarket grocery store ("Flavortown Market") as Guy Fieri poses unusual challenges to them. The winning chef of the episode can collect up to $20,000 in a shopping spree bonus round. The show often features chefs from Diners, Drive-Ins, and Dives, another show hosted by Fieri. The show Dessert Games was a short-lived spin-off.

== Episode format ==
The set is laid out in the manner of a typical supermarket, whose 10 aisles are stocked with a wide range of foods that include fresh produce, meat/poultry, and frozen items. Each chef has their own station for preparing and cooking food. Three judges officiate in each episode, introduced by Fieri during the first round.

In each round, Fieri assigns a dish (usually a general type such as "a fried feast" or "an upscale dinner") and issues one or more challenges that the chefs must fulfill. Challenge types include games or random drawings to determine ingredients that must be used, items or aisles being declared off-limits, and an upper limit on the total number/price/weight of ingredients. In the absence of any pertinent restrictions imposed by Fieri, the chefs have 30 minutes to collect their ingredients in one trip, using a standard shopping cart, and prepare/plate their dishes. They must cook their dishes and complete four platings (three for the judges and one "beauty plate") before time runs out. At the end of each round, the judges taste and evaluate the dishes and select one chef to be "checked out," or eliminated from the game with no winnings. On occasion, the chefs compete through only two rounds instead of the usual three and/or face two eliminations at the end of a single round.

The last remaining chef advances to the bonus round, Guy's Shopping Spree, for a chance to win up to $20,000 in two minutes. The two main formats prior to 2020 were:

- Seasons 1–11: The chef must retrieve one named item from each of the market's 10 aisles, receiving $2,000 for each item placed in the shopping cart.
- Season 12 to present: Fieri reads five clues, each of which can be answered with a particular item, and the chef receives $4,000 for each item placed in the cart.

On occasion, such as during tournaments or specially themed episodes, Guy's Shopping Spree is not played and Fieri awards the full $20,000 to the winner.

=== Guy's Grocery Games: Delivery ===
"Delivery" episodes, filmed in 2020 as a response to the COVID-19 pandemic, involve three chefs (usually ones who have served as judges) cooking in their home kitchens through two rounds of competition. Chefs receive one or two boxes containing food (and sometimes equipment) to re-create one or two of the studio challenges. Chefs may generally use whatever equipment they have on hand; at Fieri's direction, they may also use ingredients of their own.

A three-judge panel evaluates the chefs' dishes in each round. Instead of choosing a chef to be checked out by consensus, the judges individually assign point scores in each round based on gameplay (15), creativity (15), plating (10), and the chef's description of the taste (10), for a maximum possible total of 50. A chef's score in each category equals the average of the three judges' ratings. The high scorer from the first round receives an "Envelope of Opportunity," which grants an advantage for the second round and, occasionally, a donation to a charity of the chef's choice. The low scorer must open a "Package of Pain," which assigns either an impediment for the second round or an embarrassing item they must wear or task they must do. After two rounds, the chef with the highest total score from both rounds wins and can either accept a guaranteed cash payout (typically $5,000 to $10,000), or let Fieri determine the prize by spinning a wheel with values ranging from $0 to $20,000.

These episodes are presented jointly by Fieri and his son, Hunter and aired as part of the show's 25th and 26th seasons.

Upon the show's return to the studio, the two-round format and scoring system were retained, though modified to taste (20), gameplay (20), and plating (10), for a total of 50 points per round. Either three or four chefs compete as in previous seasons; the lowest scorer after the first round is eliminated, and the winner is determined by highest combined score. The day's champion can choose to either play Guy's Shopping Spree or accept a mystery check worth up to $20,000, with Fieri announcing a minimum possible value for the latter that changes from one episode to the next.

== Challenges ==
A wide variety of challenges and games are used in the show with new games added as the series progresses (and some games tweaked or changed a little). Some of the following games have been played once or twice while others have become familiar game staples. Some episodes combine two games at once (e.g., combining Frozen Food Feud and Can Can)

- 1, 2, 3: Chefs must prepare a specified ingredient in two different ways and may only shop in three aisles.
- 2 for 1 Special: Played in the final round. Each chef must select one of three unusual ingredient pairings and use both items in their dish.
- ABC Game: All ingredients must begin with the same randomly chosen letter of the alphabet.
- Aisle Down: Not announced until the contestants begin shopping; an aisle containing one or more key ingredients for their dish is blocked off by police tape, forcing the chefs to quickly find an alternative.
- Basket Shop: Used when pairs of chefs are competing. Instead of shopping carts, the teams must collect their ingredients in hand-carried baskets, with each teammate holding one handle at all times.
- Budget Battle: The contestants are given a set amount of money to shop for ingredients, and may take advantage of coupons or price specials throughout the market (and, in some episodes, to exchange items they are not using). Some episodes consist of a single Budget Battle spanning all three rounds; in this case, Fieri sets their total budget for the entire game before the first round, but chefs may apportion the money as they see fit and reuse leftovers from previous rounds.
- Cart/Station Swap: Used mainly in the final round, the two chefs must trade shopping carts or cooking stations, thus being forced to use each other's ingredients and/or work in progress.
- Can Can: Contestants are only allowed to use canned food items in their dish.
- The Claw: Announced mid-round, contestants have to play a claw game and grab a little plastic ball with an ingredient label on it. Inside is an undesirable version of that ingredient, which must be used in the dish. (E.g. a ball labeled "corn" might contain candy corn.)
- Clearance Carts: Chefs must get all their ingredients from three carts filled with assorted odd items.
- Closing Time: Mid-shopping, an announcement is made that the store is closing, limiting the time the chefs can spend in the aisles.
- Crazy Can Roulette: Each chef selects one of several unlabeled cans and must use its contents (marked on the bottom end) in their dish.
- Divide and Conquer: Used when pairs of chefs are competing. A strip of tape divides the market in half from front to back, running along Aisle 5. The two chefs in each pair must shop on opposite sides of this line, but may call out suggestions and/or speak face-to-face in Aisle 5 as desired.
- Express Lane: Chefs may use no more than a specified number of ingredients. A variation is Register Run, in which the first chef to reach the checkout aisle may use the full number of ingredients and each successive chef must use one fewer than the preceding competitor.
- Flip This Dish: Contestants must use ingredients for one type of dish to create a totally different type, such as dessert ingredients being used in a savory dish.
- Food Pyramid: Similar to the pricing game Plinko on The Price Is Right. A ball is dropped down a peg-covered pyramid to determine what ingredients or other restrictions, on three levels, the chefs must use in their dish.
- Food Wheel: One or two wheels are spun to determine the game restriction like mandatory ingredients, which aisles to use, and/or food budget. The most common variation is the High/Low Food Wheel, in which Fieri spins one wheel consisting of expensive ingredients and a second one of low-end groceries; the chefs must use both items in their dishes.
- Frozen Food Feud: The chefs are only allowed to use frozen items in their dishes.
- Grocery Bowl: Chefs each roll one melon toward soda bottles labeled with ingredients or aisle numbers, and must use whatever they leave standing or knock down, depending on Fieri's instructions. On occasion, Fieri or one of the judges will roll an extra melon after the chefs have all taken their turns.
- Grocery List: Each chef is given a list of items that must be incorporated into that round's dish (a mix of specific food items and more generic suggestions such as "something from aisle 6" or "something under $1.99"). Variations include Emoji List, where the ingredients are represented by emojis, and Ultimate Grocery List, in which the chefs are given a list of ingredients that they must use during the entire competition but may decide which ones to use in each round.
- Jackpot Luck: Contestants pull a lever on a special slot machine and must use the three random ingredients that appear when the machine stops.
- Keep It Sample: The chefs must incorporate at least two ingredients from four different sample tables located throughout the store in their dish.
- Kiddie Carts: (Sometimes spelled "Kiddie Karts") The chefs must use child-size shopping carts to collect their ingredients in one trip through the market, and must push the carts instead of carrying them.
- Let It Roll: The chefs roll a set of dice to determine the constraints for the assigned dish, such as required ingredients and equipment, budget, and shopping time.
- Lunch Rush/Dinner Rush: The chefs' shopping/prep/cook time is reduced from 30 minutes to 20 (or 15, on rare occasions).
- Meals from the Middle: Contestants can only use groceries from the middle aisles, which contain no fresh meat, produce, dairy products, or frozen foods.
- Menu Magnet Madness: From three rows of refrigerator magnets, the contestants must each pick a flavor (sweet, sour, smoky, etc.), a protein (chicken, tofu, fish, etc.), and/or a style of dish (salad, stew, stir-fry, etc.). Variations of this game include a player choosing a combination for their competitor, players secretly choosing one magnet each and then revealing them to form a theme that all of them must follow, or Fieri choosing the last magnet himself (usually something that clashes with the other chosen items).
- Menu Pick: Each chef chooses one menu from a stack to determine both a restriction on the type of dish they must prepare and their budget for the round.
- Musical Carts: A song plays during the shopping phase; when it stops, the chefs must abandon their own carts, find another one (usually an opponent's cart), and continue shopping. Each chef must then use some of the ingredients they did not choose in their dish, adhering to a minimum number set by Fieri. Variations on this game include switching to abandoned carts with some undesirable ingredients.
- Name Your Number: Before the first round, chefs are each given three numbered cards. They choose one card at the start of each round to indicate the number of ingredients they intend to use for it; however, each number may only be used once.
- No Carts Allowed: Contestants may only use the ingredients they can collect in one trip, without using a cart. They are allowed to use large items as carrying vessels for smaller ones, but may not put any items in their pockets or aprons.
- No-Shop Showdown: Chefs are not allowed to do any shopping for the entire competition, but must instead use a cart full of groceries provided by Fieri at the start of the first round.
- Odd/Even: Based on a coin toss, the chefs may only shop in either the odd or even-numbered aisles. A variation is Over/Under, in which the toss determines whether the chefs must only use items higher or lower than a randomly chosen price.
- One Ingredient at a Time: Chefs may only get one ingredient per trip through the market, but may make as many trips as needed.
- One Ingredient Per Aisle: Played in the final round. The two chefs remaining must take only one ingredient from each of the market's 10 aisles, and must use all the chosen ingredients in their dish.
- Order Up Mash-Up: Played in the final round. Chefs separately choose one of several dishes (presented on diner order tickets) and must combine them into a single dish.
- Out of Sight: Chefs are blindfolded and must choose an item from a large clearance cart that they will have to incorporate into their dish.
- Out of Stock: After the chefs begin shopping, Fieri announces that a key ingredient they need for their dishes is out of stock, forcing them to devise an alternative.
- Price Check: All ingredients used by the chefs must have prices that start (or sometimes end) with a number randomly chosen by Fieri. A variation is $[X] Price Check, in which the chefs may only use ingredients costing no more than a specified price.
- Red Light/Green Light: Traffic lights change between red and green to indicate whether certain aisles are open or closed.
- Red Light Special: During the round, one item in the store is marked with a sign and a flashing red light, and the chefs must get that item and incorporate it into their dish. The item is typically not associated with the assigned dish, such as beef jerky for a dessert.
- Scavenger Hunt: Contestants are given a clue and must find the item that corresponds to it. That item has a clue which will lead them to another one in turn. They must collect a total of four items in this manner and use all of them.
- Shoplift: The chefs are given oversized jackets or track suits to wear and must stuff all their ingredients into their clothing, without using carts. If Fieri spots a chef "stealing" ingredients in this way, they must unload everything they have taken and start again. In some episodes, Fieri brings in additional "security officers" to patrol the aisles with him.
- Shop Swap: Used when pairs of chefs are competing. Teams are given a limited time to shop for ingredients; one member of each team shops during the first half, the other during the second half, and they may not speak to each other until time has run out.
- Single Aisle Showdown: The chefs are only allowed to shop in one aisle specified by Fieri for the whole round. In variations of this game, the chefs determine the permissible aisles by choosing numbered beach balls or throwing darts to pop balloons with numbers hidden behind them.
- Single Shop Showdown: The chefs must do all their shopping for the entire competition during the first round, but are not told at the time what dishes they must prepare in the second or third rounds. They must also adhere to a preset shopping budget.
- Sliders: A version of shuffleboard where contestants push a disk with a long stick and must use the ingredient corresponding to where it lands.
- Special Delivery: A mid-round game in which the chefs receive an unusual ingredient that they must use in their dishes.
- Speed Shop or [X]-Minute Shop: The chefs are told at the outset how much shopping time they will have.
- Split Shop: Used when pairs of chefs are competing. One chef writes down a list of items for the other to get from the market, but may not indicate what dish they have in mind; the shopper may change the list based on the dish they think their partner wants to make.
- Spree Ball: A version of the arcade game skee ball. Each chef rolls an orange toward a target board to determine a constraint such as a required ingredient or a spending limit. More desirable results correspond to the higher, harder-to-reach targets.
- Think Small: The chefs may use only the ingredients they can fit in a small shopping bag or basket during one trip through the market.
- Time-Out: Used mid-round when pairs of chefs are competing. One chef in each pair must leave the station and write instructions for the other on a chalkboard, without speaking.
- Top Shelf/Bottom Shelf: A coin toss determines whether chefs may get ingredients from only the top or bottom shelf in each aisle.
- Un-gredient List: After assigning the dish, Fieri lists several ingredients typically used in it and forbids the chefs from using any of them, forcing them to find substitutes.
- Watch Your Weight: The chefs are given a weight limit for their combined ingredients and must weigh their choices on a produce scale in order to verify that they do not exceed it.
- Wild Card: Each chef draws a card at random to determine an ingredient they must use.
- World Fusion: Picking two flags out of a hollow globe, the chefs must combine two international cuisines into one cohesive dish.

=== Culinary quizzes ===
In addition to challenging games, the show featured culinary quizzes at times throughout the first 11 seasons. Each quiz referred to a specific item; the first chef to find that item and bring it to Fieri won an advantage for the current round, such as being allowed to get extra ingredients or enter an aisle declared off-limits.

- Culinary Quiz: Identify an item based on a series of clues given by Fieri.
- Culinary Close Up: Chefs are shown a close-up of a food item that slowly zooms out.
- Grocery Pictogram: Chefs are shown a rebus of pictures that can be used to "spell out" a grocery item.
- Know Your Varieties: Identify an item based on different names/varieties listed by Fieri.
- Logo Lowdown: Fieri reads a series of clues about a brand name as its logo is slowly revealed on a screen.
- Market Multiple Choice: Three choices are displayed on a screen, one of which is the correct answer to a question read by Fieri.
- Vowel Play: The name of a product is displayed on a screen, with all vowels and any spaces between words removed; these are gradually filled in.
- Word: Fieri reads clues about a food item and gradually reveals the letters in its name.

== Production ==
Season 1 was shot inside of an actual grocery store, Field's Market, in West Hills, Los Angeles. For Season 2, the market was built in a 15,500-square-foot (1,440 m^{2}) warehouse in Santa Rosa, California. It was built over two weeks and stocked with over $700,000 of food. After each episode, the perishable items are donated to local food banks and scraps are donated to farmers.

The casting process to get on the show is described as "surprisingly streamlined" with potential contestants conducting a Skype interview and submitting photos of their best dishes. Once chosen, a member of production will arrange travel plans and bring the contestant to California. Each episode takes up to 12 hours to shoot, with a large portion of that time devoted to off-screen interviews. Chefs must be 18 years or older to compete on the show.

== Episodes ==
| Season | Episodes | Originally released | |
| Season | Episodes | First released | Last released |
|---|---|---|---|
| 1 | 12 | October 20, 2013 | January 19, 2014 |
| 2 | 11 | May 11, 2014 | July 20, 2014 |
| 3 | 15 | July 27, 2014 | December 14, 2014 |
| 4 | 16 | January 4, 2015 | April 26, 2015 |
| 5 | 10 | May 3, 2015 | July 5, 2015 |
| 6 | 12 | July 12, 2015 | September 27, 2015 |
| 7 | 14 | October 4, 2015 | December 27, 2015 |
| 8 | 11 | January 3, 2016 | March 13, 2016 |
| 9 | 12 | March 20, 2016 | June 26, 2016 |
| 10 | 12 | July 3, 2016 | July 12, 2016 |
| 11 | 15 | October 2, 2016 | December 25, 2016 |
| 12 | 15 | January 2, 2017 | April 9, 2017 |
| 13 | 11 | April 23, 2017 | July 16, 2017 |
| 14 | 10 | July 23, 2017 | October 8, 2017 |
| 15 | 11 | October 15, 2017 | January 7, 2018 |
| 16 | 15 | January 14, 2018 | March 11, 2018 |
| 17 | 15 | February 28, 2018 | May 13, 2018 |
| 18 | 21 | May 16, 2018 | October 3, 2018 |
| 19 | 19 | September 26, 2018 | February 20, 2019 |
| 20 | 26 | December 23, 2018 | August 4, 2019 |
| 21 | 17 | August 21, 2019 | November 6, 2019 |
| 22 | 13 | November 13, 2019 | January 29, 2020 |
| 23 | 12 | February 5, 2019 | April 15, 2020 |
| 24 | 15 | April 22, 2020 | August 5, 2020 |
| 25 | 24 | August 12, 2020 | January 27, 2021 |
| 26 | 17 | February 17, 2021 | June 30, 2021 |
| 27 | 13 | July 7, 2021 | September 22, 2021 |
| 28 | 8 | September 29, 2021 | December 15, 2021 |
| 29 | 14 | January 5, 2022 | May 11, 2022 |
| 30 | 12 | May 25, 2022 | October 5, 2022 |
| 31 | 9 | November 16, 2022 | February 1, 2023 |
| 32 | 11 | February 8, 2023 | May 24, 2023 |
| 33 | 10 | June 7, 2023 | August 9, 2023 |
| 34 | 12 | August 16, 2023 | November 1, 2023 |
| 35 | 11 | November 8, 2023 | January 31, 2024 |
| 36 | 12 | February 21, 2024 | April 24, 2024 |
| 37 | 11 | September 4, 2024 | October 30, 2024 |
| 38 | 10 | January 8, 2025 | March 12, 2025 |
| 39 | 11 | March 26, 2025 | June 4, 2025 |
| 40 | 13 | June 18, 2025 | September 25, 2025 |
| 41 | 5 | January 21, 2026 | February 25, 2026 |
| 42 | 13 | June 10, 2026 | 2026 |
