= Ultimate Recipe Showdown =

- Genre: Cooking show
- Created by: Food Network
- Starring: Guy Fieri
- Country of origin: United States

Original release
- Network: Food Network

Ultimate Recipe Showdown is a program shown on Food Network. The program was originally hosted by Marc Summers and Guy Fieri. For the second season, Fieri hosted the program alone.

There were three seasons between 2008 and 2010.

== Format ==
Each contest had three home cooks who had won their way into the competition. The episode had a theme such as "comfort food". Each round had a specialized section of the theme, such as macaroni and cheese. In each round, the contestants would be given points out of 100. The three judges included Katherine Alford, Kerry Simon and Russ Parsons. The judges would not watch the contestants as they judged. The top scorer of the night won the top prize of $25,000 and their recipe was featured on the menu of T.G.I. Friday's.

For the second season there were some format changes. Each episode had a theme, but four contestants competed in the entire program. The two rounds were Signature, where the contestants had 2 hours to make a dish, and the Speed Round, where the contestants had 30 minutes for a dish. This time the judges watched the contestants throughout the program. The judges were Alford, Michael Psilakis (owner of Dona, Kefi, and Anthos, three popular Greek restaurants) and Linda Fears, editor-in-chief of Family Circle magazine.
