= Diners, Drive-Ins and Dives =

American food reality television series

- Genre: Food reality television
- Presented by: Guy Fieri; Hunter Fieri
- Country of origin: United States
- Original language: English
- No. of seasons: 43
- No. of episodes: 534 (list of episodes)

Production
- Running time: 22 minutes
- Production companies: Page Productions (2007–2011); Citizen Pictures (2011–present)

Original release
- Network: Food Network
- Release: April 23, 2007 – present

Diners, Drive-Ins and Dives (often nicknamed Triple D and stylized as Diners, Drive-Ins, Dives) is an American food reality television series that has aired on the Food Network since April 23, 2007. It is hosted by Guy Fieri, with Fieri's son Hunter as co-host in later episodes. The show originally began as a one-off special that aired on November 6, 2006. The show features a road trip concept, similar to Road Tasted, Giada's Weekend Getaways, and $40 a Day. Fieri travels around the United States, Canada, and Mexico, looking at various diners, drive-in restaurants, and dive bars. He has also featured restaurants in European cities, including London and Florence, as well as in Cuba and Puerto Rico (see the episodes page).

== Premise ==
Each episode generally has a unifying theme (such as burgers, ribs, or seafood) with the host visiting multiple restaurants within a single city or multiple cities to sample the food that corresponds to this theme. The program focuses on small, independent eateries featuring traditional comfort foods (such as barbecue, smoked meat, hamburgers, deep-fried food, pizza, steak, and bacon-and-egg breakfast), regional styles, or ethnic specialties. Often, the chosen restaurants will use fresh ingredients, home-style recipes, and gourmet culinary approaches to what is usually not considered gourmet food. The host interacts with both the customers, to get their opinion on the food, and with the kitchen staff, who demonstrate how to prepare multiple star dishes on their menus. Getting to know the chefs and managers behind each restaurant connects viewers of the show to the people behind the food and contributes to increased visitation of the featured restaurants. Some episodes, under the title "Triple D Nation," revisit restaurants from previous episodes to check in on new dishes and other updates from the restaurant.

=== Takeout ===
In Season 35, the show was reformatted as "Triple D Takeout" due to the COVID-19 pandemic; the episodes featured a modified format, in which Fieri interviewed restaurant chefs via videoconferencing to discuss their responses to the pandemic's impact. The chefs then guided Fieri in preparing their recipes using ingredients shipped to him. Takeout episodes of the show were filmed at Fieri's home in California with the help of his children, Hunter and Ryder. The show transitioned back to all in-person visits in Season 40.

== Guest appearances ==
The show has had various stars appear in the kitchen alongside Guy Fieri, including fellow chefs Robert Irvine, Andrew Zimmern, Michael Symon, Emeril Lagasse, and Geoffrey Zakarian, as well as celebrities such as Matthew McConaughey, Gene Hackman who made his final appearance in the fifth season premiere, Rosie O'Donnell, Joe Theismann, Chris Rock, Kid Rock, Adam Sandler, Kevin James, Clint Bowyer, Martin Sheen, Gene Simmons, Steve Harwell, E-40, Sammy Hagar, and Mick Fleetwood. Guests usually take Guy to their favorite restaurants in their hometowns, and also join Guy on new adventures.

== Lawsuit ==
In May 2011, Page Productions, the original producers of the show, filed a lawsuit against Food Network. The lawsuit alleges that the network failed to pay required production costs, and failed to make the show's host, Guy Fieri, available for taping.

A week after Food Network counter-sued the producer, a settlement was reached in August 2011, allowing the 12th season of the show to resume, with a new production company, Citizen Pictures.

== Impact ==
Throughout the years, more than 800 restaurants have been mentioned on the show, resulting in an increase in customers for many of them. Due to the show's popularity, long-term effects have included increases in both customers and sales.

In 2015, the owner of Duluth specialty market Northern Waters Smokehaus said that being featured in a 2010 episode had "jump started" its mail-order business, and that the long-term growth in business had proved consistent.

Donatelli's, a restaurant in White Bear Lake, Minnesota, said that their appearance on the show "saved us from going out of business." They experienced an average, sustained 20% increase in sales since the airing of the episode in 2008. Over ten years later, the restaurant was still reaping the benefits of their appearance.

== See also ==
- Roadfood
- Guy's Grocery Games
- Guy's Big Bite
