= Guy's Big Bite =

- Genre: Cooking show
- Created by: Food Network
- Starring: Guy Fieri
- Country of origin: United States
- No. of seasons: 19
- No. of episodes: 191

Production
- Running time: approx. 22 minutes

Original release
- Network: Food Network
- Release: June 25, 2006 – December 18, 2016

Guy's Big Bite was a Food Network show starring Guy Fieri after he won the second season of The Next Food Network Star. The inaugural six-episode season premiered on June 25, 2006, in the 10:00 a.m. (EST) timeslot. The initial concept included Fieri cooking in a bachelor pad-like set featuring a large television and car memorabilia. Executives reportedly loved the show, including Fieri's magnetic personality.

Food Network renewed the series after the successful inaugural trial run. Beginning in season Two, Fieri received a more personalized set including a "guy" fridge with a #05 and racing stripes, a pin ball machine, big screen television, in-house bar, and a bumper-pool table. He then regularly had his friends and "posse" join him during episodes.

In season 10, Fieri shifted the focus from a studio kitchen to his own backyard, having guests at his own home besides his own techniques in the backyard of his home.

Guy's Big Bite aired for nineteen seasons, completing in 2016.
