= Food Network =

American basic cable channel

- Logo used since January 2013
- Country: United States
- Broadcast area: Worldwide
- Headquarters: New York City, New York, United States

Programming
- Picture format: 1080i HDTV
- Timeshift service: Food Network +1 (UK)

Ownership
- Owner: Skydance (Skydance TV) (69%); Nexstar Media Group (31%)
- Parent: Television Food Network, G.P.

History
- Launched: November 23, 1993; 32 years ago
- Founder: Reese Schonfeld; Jack Clifford; Joe Langhan
- Former names: TV Food Network (1993–1996)

Links
- Website: foodnetwork.com

Availability

Terrestrial
- Freeview (UK): Channel 43
- DStv (Sub-Saharan Africa): Channel 175

Streaming media
- Affiliated Streaming Service: HBO Max
- Services: DirecTV Stream, Hulu + Live TV, Philo, Sling TV, Vidgo, YouTube TV

Food Network is an American basic cable channel owned by Television Food Network, G.P., a unit of Skydance, which manages and operates it as a division of TV Media division. The channel airs both special and regular episodic programs about food and cooking. Cooking Channel, a network launched in 2010, is a spin-off of Food Network. In addition to its headquarters in New York City, Food Network has offices in Atlanta, Los Angeles, San Francisco, Chicago, Detroit, Jersey City, Cincinnati, and Knoxville.

Food Network was launched on November 23, 1993, 6:00 am as TV Food Network before the name was shortened to Food Network on April 1, 1996. It was acquired by Scripps Networks Interactive, which later merged with Discovery, Inc. in 2018. In 2022, WarnerMedia merged with Discovery, Inc. to form Warner Bros. Discovery (WBD) and in 2026, WBD was acquired by Skydance (then known as Paramount Skydance). As of November 2023, Food Network is available to approximately 70,000,000 pay television households in the United States, down from its 2011 peak of 100,000,000 households.

== History ==
In 1990, Providence Journal company president Trygve Myhren was attempting to grow the company and decided that basic cable programming at the time was a high growth area with cable companies beginning to expand their overall channel capacities. With many basic cable channels at the time, Myhren was looking for something different. With food selected as the channel's genre, the working title for the channel was The Cooking Channel until the channel's launch, although the Cooking Channel name would later be used for a spin-off channel that launched in May 2010. Myhren hired Stephen Cunningham and Reese Schonfeld, co-founder of CNN, to help Joe Langhan and Jack Clifford to found the channel. Both The Cooking Channel and the Food Network trademarks were taken by other entities, with the Food Network being a newsletter. Myrhen originally wanted the network to be operated from Providence, Rhode Island, as he argued that a cable network's costs were much more scalable from a lower-profile location, while Schonfeld preferred it be originated from New York, considered the American nucleus of culinary arts; Schonfeld's preference became settled, although at the peril of the network's launch budget, which was lower than it would have been from Providence. Cunningham also separated from the venture at that time and went on to launch other networks from his Denver base.

Food Network was formed on April 19, 1993, as "TV Food Network"; its legal name remains Television Food Network, G. P. After acquiring the Food Network trademark after several years, it shortened the name to that. The network initially launched on November 22, 1993, with two initial shows featuring David Rosengarten, Donna Hanover, and Robin Leach. On November 23, 1993, Food Network began live broadcasting. Its original partners included the Journal itself, Adelphia, Scripps-Howard, Continental Cablevision, Cablevision, and the Tribune Company, which provided the network's technical output.

Since the channel could only afford to run programming that was produced themselves, the channel started taping five shows with a potential host. This became the Chef Du Jour series.

Former logo, used from April 1, 1996 to December 31, 2002

Schonfeld was appointed as managing director of TV Food Network and maintained a spot on its management board along with two Providence Journal employees. The original lineup for the network included Emeril Lagasse (Essence of Emeril), Debbi Fields, Donna Hanover, David Rosengarten, Curtis Aikens, Louis Aronne, Jacques Pépin, and Robin Leach. The following year, the network acquired the rights to the Julia Child library from WGBH.

In 1995, Schonfeld resigned as managing director of the network, but remained on its board until 1998, when he and Cunningham sold their interest in the company to Scripps. In 1996, Erica Gruen was hired as the president and CEO of TV Food Network, becoming the second woman in history to be the CEO of a U.S. television network. That same year, the "TV" portion of the name was removed, shorting the network's name to simply Food Network. Gruen led the network into an explosive growth until 1998, by launching the largest website for food, FoodNetwork.com, more than doubling the subscriber base, tripling the viewership and multiplying the network's yearly revenue. In 1997, it was the second fastest growing cable network. Gruen changed the brand positioning from Schonfeld's "TV for people who cook" to "TV for everyone who loves to eat," thereby greatly improving the appeal to viewers and advertisers, and saving the network from bankruptcy. Greg Willis and Cathy Rasenberger were two of the original members of the launch team who led the affiliate sales and marketing of the company from 1995 to 1998. Greg Willis served as senior vice president of worldwide distribution until he left to join Liberty Media in 1998.

Food Network logo used from January 1, 2003 to January 5, 2013. On January 6, 2013, a new version of this logo was introduced with a different font.

The A. H. Belo Corporation acquired Food Network when it purchased The Providence Journal Company in February 1997. Belo sold its 56% stake in the channel to the E. W. Scripps Company in October 1997, in a trade deal that resulted in Belo acquiring the television-radio station combination of KENS-AM/TV in San Antonio, Texas.

The 1080i high definition simulcast feed of Food Network launched on March 31, 2008.

Food Network was first launched outside of North America in the United Kingdom on November 9, 2009, and in Asia on July 5, 2010 (on StarHub TV channel 433 and in HD on channel 468). Since the November 2009 UK launch on Sky, the channel has been added to the Freesat, Freeview and Virgin Media platforms.

In January 2015, the Food Network collaborated with Snapchat and launched its own Food Network channel, "Discover Food Network", where social media users could watch the channel through the app. The channel featured recipes and food tips to entertain and appeal to the millennial market.

In 2019, Tribune was acquired by Nexstar Media Group.

== Programming ==
Food Network programming is divided into a daytime block known as "Food Network in the Kitchen" and a primetime lineup branded as "Food Network Nighttime". Generally, "In the Kitchen" is dedicated to instructional cooking programs, while "Nighttime" features food-related entertainment programs, such as cooking competitions, food-related travel shows, and reality shows. Promos identify "Food Network Nighttime" programming but not "In the Kitchen" daytime programming. Many of the channel's personalities routinely host both daytime and nighttime programming, and the channel regularly offers specials which typically either follow its personalities on working vacations, or bring together a number of personalities for a themed cooking event. Food Network broadcasts on weekdays from 8:00 a.m. to 5:00 a.m. and weekends from 7:00 a.m. to 4:00 a.m. ET, with infomercials airing on the remaining hours. The UK channel broadcasts from 6:00 a.m. to 3:00 a.m. (UK time GMT/BST as applicable) daily.

Mario Batali and Bobby Flay joined the network in 1995. In 1996, Erica Gruen, the network's CEO created Emeril Live!, which became the channel's signature series. Although Batali left the network, Flay continues to regularly appear on many programs, including Iron Chef America, the channel's well-received remake of the original Japanese series. Iron Chef America's host, Alton Brown, gained a cult following for his Good Eats, which mixed science, cooking and off-beat humor. The network alos had a series titled Ruggerio to Go hosted by David Ruggerio.

In 2002, Food Network made an appeal to home cooking with the premiere of Paula's Home Cooking, hosted by Paula Deen. Home Cooking focused mostly on Southern cuisine and comfort food. The show took overly complicated recipes and classic dishes and broke them down for the home cook. The show did increasingly well, and Deen revamped the show in a series called Paula's Best Dishes. In this series, friends and family members would join her in the kitchen and put a twist on classics and introduce new recipes. In June 2013, Food Network announced that they had terminated Deen's contract due to publicity about her racial remarks revealed in a lawsuit brought on by a former worker.

Also in 2002, Ina Garten's show Barefoot Contessa aired. Garten is well known for cookbooks, including The Barefoot Contessa Cookbook, Barefoot Contessa Family Style, and Barefoot Contessa in Paris. Garten was also mentored by Martha Stewart. Garten's show features her cooking for her husband or hosting friends at their home in The Hamptons, New York. Barefoot Contessa was reported to have about one million viewers per episode, and received some of the highest ratings for Food Network.

The channel's biggest cross-over stars include Rachael Ray and Paula Deen, who have both taken their cable following (primarily through the series 30 Minute Meals, $40 a Day, and Paula's Best Dishes) into a syndicated talk show and Positively Paula. Both Paula Deen and Rachael Ray also have merchandise lines of cookware, food products and pet lines.

Beginning in 2005, an annual reality contest, The Next Food Network Star, featured viewers competing in New York City for their own show on the channel. Previous winners include Dan Smith and Steve McDonagh (Party Line with The Hearty Boys), Guy Fieri (Guy's Big Bite, Diners, Drive-Ins and Dives, Guy Off the Hook, Ultimate Recipe Showdown, Guy's Big Night, Guy's Family Feast, Guy's Grocery Games), Amy Finley (The Gourmet Next Door), Aaron McCargo Jr. (Big Daddy's House), Melissa d'Arabian (Ten Dollar Dinners), and Aarti Sequeira (Aarti Party). For the 2010 season, production of The Next Food Network Star was relocated to Los Angeles. It became the network's flagship show. For most of its 13-year run, season finales of the show was followed by lead-out shows the network promoted for high ratings and popularity. These consisted of either premieres of new shows, season premieres of continuing shows, or episodes of continuing shows that were significant to the schedule. For instance, a 2018 season finale of Food Network Star was followed by the season premiere of Beat Bobby Flay.

In December 2007, The New York Times business section published an article on the end of Emeril Lagasse's show Emeril Live, and quoted Brooke Johnson, the president, as saying that Lagasse "remains a valued member of the Food Network family". Derek Baine, senior analyst at the media research firm SNL Kagan, is reported to have commented, "It's not surprising that people move on... They pay almost nothing for the people as they are building their careers... That's been their strategy all along". The article also commented on the declining popularity of the Food Network whose daily ratings were reported had decreased "to an average of 544,000 people from 580,000 a year [earlier]". It noted, "More significant, its signature weekend block of instructional programs, known collectively as 'In the Kitchen,' has lost 15 percent of its audience in the last year, to 830,000 viewers on average. This had left the network owing refunds, known as 'make goods,' to advertisers." Erica Gruen, president and CEO of the Food Network from 1996 to 1998, who created Emeril Live during her tenure, was reported to have blamed the decline on increased competition, "There's all sorts of instructional cooking video on the Web". It also reported that Bob Tuschman, Food Network's senior vice president for programming and production, said the weekend ratings decline was "nothing we haven't anticipated". He said the network's ratings in that time period grew by double digits in each of the previous four years, growth that could not be sustained. It also wrote that in 2006, "the Food Network began aggressively trying to change that with new deals that were 'way more onerous' from the stars' point of view, said a person who has been affected by the changing strategy, by insisting on a stake in book deals and licensing ventures, and control over outside activities".

== Carriage disputes ==
On January 1, 2010, HGTV and Food Network were removed from cable provider Cablevision, which operates systems serving areas surrounding New York City. Scripps removed HGTV and Food Network from Cablevision following the expiration of the company's carriage contract on December 31, 2009; Cablevision and Scripps had been in negotiations for several months to agree on a new contract, but no progress had been made. The discontinuance of Food Network from Cablevision led the channel to make arrangements with Tribune-owned CW affiliates WPIX in New York City and WTXX in Hartford, Connecticut, to broadcast a special episode of Iron Chef America with First Lady Michelle Obama on January 10, 2010, after that episode enjoyed high ratings on its January 3 cable premiere. On January 21, 2010, Cablevision and Scripps reached an agreement that resulted in Food Network and HGTV being restored on Cablevision's systems that day.

A similar carriage dispute with AT&T U-verse resulted in Food Network, Cooking Channel, HGTV, DIY Network, and Great American Country being removed by the provider on November 5, 2010; the dispute was resolved two days later, on November 7, 2010, after the two parties reached a new carriage agreement.

== Food Network properties in video games ==
Red Fly Studio developed a video game for the Wii console in partnership with Food Network called Cook or Be Cooked. The game, which was published by Namco Bandai Games and was released on November 3, 2009, simulates real cooking experiences. Players can also try out the recipes featured on the game. Other games include Iron Chef America: Supreme Cuisine, based on Iron Chef America and PC game Cooking Simulator, developed by Big Cheese studio and released on October 24, 2019, which extended downloadable content branded with Food Network branding, including a kitchen which resembles a Food Network competitive cooking show's studio, complete with a studio audience section.

== International variants and languages ==
=== UK and Ireland ===
In accordance with an agreement between Scripps and Chellomedia, Food Network programs started to air internationally in the fourth quarter of 2009 in the United Kingdom and then in other markets in early 2010.

Food Network UK initially launched on the Sky platform as a free-to-air channel, joined by a +1 hour timeshift, taking the channel slots vacated by the closure of Real Estate TV. Following Scripps' acquisition of Travel Channel International, the four channel positions on Sky were reordered to move Food Network to a higher position. Food Network and +1 were subsequently also made available on the Freesat satellite platform.

On terrestrial service Freeview, initially a four-hour primetime evening block was acquired, sharing capacity with channels including Create and Craft; subsequently Food Network relocated to its own full-day service, with the four-hour berth used to air Travel Channel on DTT. Travel has since moved to all-day operation, with the evening hours being absorbed into Create & Craft. Scripps subsequently signed a carriage deal with Virgin Media to add Food Network and Travel Channel on the cable platform, in Travel's case this was a re-addition following its earlier removal from the cable platform.

In September 2019, it was announced that UKTV channel Good Food, which Discovery had acquired full control of earlier in the year, would be closed from September 12, 2019; its content merged into Food Network UK.

=== Elsewhere ===
Some countries have their own Food Network. Examples include: Flavour Network, Food Network Asia, Food Network Italy and Food Network Europe. In the second half of 2014, Food Network Brazil began broadcasting with programs fully dubbed in Portuguese and optional subtitles. On February 1, 2015, Food Network Asia launched on Australian IPTV service Fetch TV. The channel launched in Latin America in March 2015 with full Spanish dubbed programs.

A localized free-to-air Australian version was launched on November 17, 2015 by SBS, which had a licensing and programming output arrangement with Scripps. Another reiteration, the Seven Network's 7food network began broadcasting in December 2018, after SBS's deal ended in November 2018, and the network was rebranded to SBS Food. After lower than expected ratings, 7food network closed on December 28, 2019, although select Food Network shows continued to air on sister network 7flix until December 1, 2020.

In Australia, Food Network broadcasts on IPTV service Fetch on channel 136.

On December 1, 2018, Discovery Networks Asia Pacific rebranded its Food TV channel in New Zealand to a New Zealand version of Food Network. On February 3, 2021, Sky announced that Food Network would close in New Zealand and a selection of Food Network shows would be moved to its sister channel, Living. On March 1, 2021, the channel was replaced by Investigation Discovery.

The Food Network airs in Spanish on the Hogar de HGTV channel. They share this network with Discovery and HGTV.

Food Network was available in the Netherlands and Flanders between April 22, 2010, and January 31, 2019. Content from former Scripps television channels Travel Channel, Fine Living and Food Network were integrated into the programming of Discovery, TLC and Investigation Discovery in the Benelux.

== Television Food Network, G.P. ==
Founded in 1993, the company's business includes visual and textual television programs on a subscription or fee basis. In 2011, Scripps requested to add its Cooking Channel (formerly Fine Living Network) to the partnership, and Tribune agreed for $350 million, Tribune would need to add additional capital.

== Criticism ==
=== Consumerism and programming ===
While Food Network programming generally does not explicitly advertise products, author Cheri Ketchum argues that Food Network advertises a lifestyle that is consistent with the norms of consumer culture. Ketchum argues that Food Network deliberately chooses non-controversial programming, rather than programming that challenges aspects of consumer culture such as food classism, food deserts, food waste, and environmental impacts of food production. Critics of Food Network such as Michael Z. Newman argue that the use of lighting and close-ups, along with the use of conventionally attractive hosts, create a fetishization of desirable foods and a consumerist lifestyle.

=== Racial representation ===
Critics complain of disproportionate racial representation in Food Network programming. Tasha Oren argues that the overrepresentation of Asian-Americans in competition shows on the network, along with an absence of Asian-Americans as hosts of programs, contributes to the "model minority" stereotype of Asian-Americans. However, Oren also offers the perspective that competition shows are viewed by network management as a low-risk entry point for hosts, especially those for whom a program may not be well received by audiences.

== See also ==
- Flavour Network (Canada)
- 7food network
- Food Network (New Zealand)
- List of Food Network original programming
- The Food Network Awards
