= The Best Thing I Ever Ate =

- Genre: Food
- Country of origin: United States
- Original language: English
- No. of seasons: 12

Production
- Executive producers: Lauren Lexton; Tom Rogan; David Hoffman; Eddie Saenz
- Producers: Joan Rantz; Anne Etheridge; Thomas Harting; Rebecca Roberts; Greg Therieau
- Cinematography: Thomas Harting; Rebecca Roberts; Greg Therieau
- Editors: Maryn Peters; Lauran Schwartz; Joshua Chamberlain; James Stanton
- Running time: 30 min. (with commercials)
- Production companies: Authentic Entertainment, LLC

Original release
- Network: Food Network
- Release: June 22, 2009 – April 2022

The Best Thing I Ever Ate is a television series that originally aired on Food Network, debuting on June 22, 2009 (after a preview on June 20).

The program originally aired as a one-time special in late 2008. After being cancelled by The Food Network, it was brought back on the Cooking Channel in 2018. It ended in 2022 after an estimate of 150~ episodes. It consists of chefs picking out favorite dishes they have eaten in places throughout the United States, in specific categories.

== Contributing chefs/hosts ==
- Ted Allen - Food and wine connoisseur; host of Chopped
- Sunny Anderson - Host of Cooking For Real; co-host of The Kitchen
- Mario Batali - Former Iron Chef, Iron Chef America; chef/owner of Babbo Ristorante e Enoteca; host of Molto Mario and Ciao America; former co-host, ABC's The Chew
- Valerie Bertinelli - Actress; host of Valerie's Home Cooking
- John Besh - Competitor on The Next Iron Chef; chef and owner of August Restaurant (New Orleans, Louisiana)
- Elena Besser - Chef/TV host; contributor to Food Network Kitchen
- Richard Blais - Chef/Restaurateur; judge on many Food Network competition shows
- Brian Boitano - Olympic figure skater and host of What Would Brian Boitano Make?
- Stephanie Boswell - Executive Pastry Chef, Peninsula Beverly Hills; judge on Halloween Baking Championship and Halloween Wars
- James Briscione - Culinary Director at Institute of Culinary Education; First ever two-time Chopped Champion
- Alton Brown - Host of Good Eats, "Cutthroat Kitchen" and Iron Chef America, and author of Good Eats 2: The Middle Years
- Kardea Brown - Chef and host of Delicious Miss Brown
- Frank Bruni - Former restaurant critic for New York Times; author of Born Round
- Justin Brunson - Chef/restaurateur; Owner at River Bear American Meats in Denver, CO
- Anne Burrell - Sous chef on Iron Chef America; host of Secrets of a Restaurant Chef; co-host of Worst Cooks in America
- Josh Capon - Executive chef at New York City's Lure Fishbar; guest judge on Chopped and Beat Bobby Flay
- Monti Carlo - Chef instructor/recipe developer; food blogger at islandgirlcooks.com
- Cody and Samantha Carroll - Louisiana Chefs; co-hosts of Food Network's Cajun Aces owners/operators of Hot Tails in New Roads, LA
- Michael Chiarello - Entrepreneur/restaurateur, and host of Easy Entertaining with Michael Chiarello
- Hannah Chloe- Host of Spoon University's SpoonProof
- Scott Conant - Host of 24 Hour Restaurant Battle, and chef/owner of Scarpetta (New York/Miami/Toronto/Beverly Hills) and D.O.C.G. Enoteca (Las Vegas)
- Cat Cora - Former Iron Chef, Iron Chef America
- Melissa d'Arabian - The Next Food Network Star Season 5 winner, and host of Ten Dollar Dinners
- Mark Dacascos - Martial artist/actor; "The Chairman" on Iron Chef America
- Paula Deen - Host of Paula's Home Cooking, Paula's Best Dishes, and Paula's Party
- Giada De Laurentiis - Host of Everyday Italian and Giada at Home; TV judge/mentor on The Next Food Network Star
- Rocco DiSpirito - Chef/author of Now Eat This! Diet; winner of James Beard Award
- Guy Fieri - Winner of Season 2 of Food Network Star; host of Diners, Drive-Ins and Dives and Guy's Big Bite, and chef/owner of Johnny Garlic's and Tex Wasabi's (California)
- Bobby Flay - Former Iron Chef, Iron Chef America; co-host/mentor of The Next Food Network Star and Throwdown! with Bobby Flay, chef/owner of Mesa Grills in New York, Las Vegas and Bahamas
- Tregaye Fraser - Winner of Season 12 of Food Network Star & host of Discovery+'s Tregaye's Way in the Kitchen
- Tyler Florence - Host of The Great Food Truck Race and Tyler's Ultimate
- Ina Garten - Host of Barefoot Contessa
- Gabriella Gershenson - TV judge on 24 Hour Restaurant Battle, senior editor Saveur Magazine
- Adam Gertler - Host of Kid in a Candy Store
- Duff Goldman - Pastry chef/owner of Charm City Cakes, and host of Ace of Cakes and Sugar High
- Alex Guarnaschelli - Chef/host on Alex's Day Off; Iron Chef on "Iron Chef America"; TV judge on Chopped; executive chef of Butter Restaurant (New York)
- Carla Hall - Chef/TV personality/former model; former co-host of ABC's The Chew
- Robert Irvine - Host of Dinner: Impossible and Restaurant: Impossible; co-host of seasons 2 & 14 of Worst Cooks in America
- Eddie Jackson - Season 11 winner of Food Network Star; host of BBQ Blitz
- Pati Jinich - Chef & Host of Pati's Mexican Table
- Judy Joo - TV judge The Next Iron Chef, Iron Chef UK, executive chef Playboy Club (London)
- Kristen Kish - Chef/TV Host; winner of Season 10 of Top Chef; host of 36 Hours on Travel Channel and co-host of Fast Foodies on TruTV
- Ali Khan - Food blogger; host of Cheap Eats
- Dan Kohler - Culinary Anthropologist/Food Nerd; contributor to Cooking Channel's Food: Fact or Fiction?
- Ellie Krieger - Host of Healthy Appetite
- Emeril Lagasse - Host on Essence of Emeril and Emeril Live
- Dan Langan - Baker/Blogger; Host, Dan Can Bake on Food Network Digital
- Nigella Lawson - Host on Nigella's Kitchen
- Katie Lee - Cookbook author/food critic; co-host of The Kitchen
- Sandra Lee - host on Semi-Homemade Cooking and Sandra's Money Saving Meals
- Shinmin Li - Pastry Chef/Cake Artist; judge on Food Network's Cookie Wars and Halloween Wars
- Tara Lipinski and Johnny Weir - Champion Figure Skaters; co-hosts of Wedding Cake Championship
- Antonia Lofaso - Chef/restaurateur; judge on Iron Chef America, Guy's Grocery Games et al.
- Sabin Lomac - Chef/TV Host; co-founder of Cousins Maine Lobster; host of Grill of Victory
- Beau MacMillan - Executive Chef, elements in Sanctuary on Camelback Mountain in Arizona
- Simon Majumdar - TV judge on The Next Iron Chef and "Iron Chef America" et al.; author of Eat My Globe
- Jeff Mauro - Season 7 winner of Food Network Star; host of Sandwich King and co-host of The Kitchen
- Brad Miller - Chef; host of Food Truck Nation on Food Network
- Brandi Milloy - Co-host of Let's Eat on Food Network; best known for the YouTube series POPSUGAR Food: Eat the Trend
- Roger Mooking - Chef/musician; host of Man Fire Food
- Marc Murphy - Chef/Restaurateur; Judge on Chopped
- Pat Neely and Gina Neely - Hosts Down Home with the Neelys
- Candace Nelson - TV judge Cupcake Wars, founder Sprinkles Cupcakes (Los Angeles, California)
- Stuart O'Keeffe - Co-host of Let's Eat on Food Network; best known for his appearance on the Food Network's Private Chefs of Beverly Hills
- Jamie Oliver - Host of Naked Chef and Jamie at Home
- Tom Papa - Comedian/Baker; host of Sirius XM's Come to Papa
- Lorraine Pascale - Chef/Former Model; Judge on Food Network's Baking Championships & judge on/host of Bakers Vs. Fakers
- Jamika Pessoa - Chef/Businesswoman; "Caterer to the Stars"
- Katie Pix - Chef/YouTube host; YouTube Channel:YouTube Channel
- Michael Psilakis - TV judge on Ultimate Recipe Showdown, chef/owner Kefi (New York)
- Wolfgang Puck - Chef and owner of Spago (Los Angeles); former Iron Chef on Iron Chef America: Battle of the Masters
- Courtney Rada - stand-up comedian; host of Carnivorous on Food Network
- Rachael Ray - Host of 30 Minute Meals and $40 a Day
- Claire Robinson - Host of 5 Ingredient Fix
- Marcus Samuelsson - Chef/restaurateur; frequent judge on Chopped
- Aarón Sánchez - Co-host on Chefs vs. City; TV judge on Chopped; executive chef/owner of Centrico (New York)
- Claudia Sandoval - Chef/Cookbook Author; Winner of Season 6 of MasterChef
- Jonathon Sawyer - James Beard Award-Winning Chef; owner of three Cleveland restaurants, including the Greenhouse Tavern
- Aarti Sequeira - Season 6 winner of Food Network Star; host of Aarti Party and Taste in Translation
- Donal Skehan - Food Writer/Singer; host of Food Channel UK's Follow Donal and co-presenter/judge on BBC's Junior MasterChef
- Fanny Slater - Cookbook Author; regular contributor to The Rachael Ray Show
- Jason Smith - Season 3 Holiday Baking Championship winner and Season 13 Food Network Star Winner
- Martha Stewart - Writer/businesswoman; host of Martha Stewart Living
- Curtis Stone - Celebrity chef; author of Relaxed Cooking With Curtis Stone
- Marc Summers - Host on Unwrapped; host/judge on Ultimate Recipe Showdown
- Michael Symon - Iron Chef, Iron Chef America; former co-host of ABC's The Chew; chef/owner Lola Lolita (Cleveland, Ohio)
- Anne Thornton - Chef/host of Dessert First with Anne Thornton
- Jet Tila - Chef & restaurateur; floor reporter for Iron Chef America
- Isaac Toups - Chef/Restaurateur; voted Fan Favorite on Top Chef: California
- Nguyen Tran - Food Writer/Restaurateur; owner of Starry Kitchen in Los Angeles, CA
- Ming Tsai - Host of "Simply Ming", chef/owner Blue Ginger (Wellesley, Massachusetts), Blue Dragon (Boston, Massachusetts)
- Justin Warner - Winner of Food Network Star Season 8; author of The Laws of Cooking: And How to Break Them
- Bev Weidner - Food Blogger; Host, Mom Wins on Food Network Digital
- Jernard Wells - Chef/cookbook author; 1st-Runner-Up in season 12 of Food Network Star
- Lee Anne Wong - Former culinary producer for Seasons 2-5 of Top Chef; owner/operator of Koko Head Café in Honolulu, HI
- Buddy Valastro - Owner/operator of Carlo's Bake Shop; star of Cake Boss
- Marcela Valladolid - Host of Mexican Made Easy; former co-host of The Kitchen
- Fabio Viviani - Chef/Vintner/Restaurateur; "Fan Favorite" winner on season 5 of Top Chef
- Casey Webb - Restaurateur; Host, Man v. Food on Cooking Channel
- Molly Yeh—Host of Food Network's Girl Meets Farm
- Andrew Zimmern - Host of Bizarre Foods with Andrew Zimmern on Travel Channel

== Season 1 ==
Episode	Show Number	Topic	Item	Chef/Host	Restaurant	Location
Pilot	EV0100	Pilot	Burnt Ends on Bun	Duff Goldman	Gates Bar-B-Q	Kansas City, Missouri
Pilot	EV0100	Pilot	Beef Marrow and Oxtail Marmalade	Anne Burrell	Blue Ribbon	New York, NY
Pilot	EV0100	Pilot	Banana Cream Pie	Adam Gertler	Bandera	Los Angeles, California
Pilot	EV0100	Pilot	Eggs Benedict	Sunny Anderson	Upstairs On the Square	Cambridge, MA
Pilot	EV0100	Pilot	Ebelskivers	Aarón Sánchez	Shopsin's	New York, NY
Pilot	EV0100	Pilot	Toasted Ricotta Gnocchi	Danny Boome	Jane Bistro	New York, NY
Pilot	EV0100	Pilot	Canolli	Alex Guarnaschelli	Caffe Dante	New York, NY
Pilot	EV0100	Pilot	Guinea Hen	Ted Allen	Restaurant Guy Savoy, Caesars Palace	Las Vegas, NV
1	EV0101	Totally Fried	French Fries	Bobby Flay	Balthazar	New York, NY
1	EV0101	Totally Fried	Deep Fried Hot Dog	Alex Guarnaschelli	Rawley's Drive In	Fairfield, Connecticut
1	EV0101	Totally Fried	Fried Shrimp Heads	Duff Goldman	Joss Sushi	Annapolis, MD
1	EV0101	Totally Fried	Made To Order Donuts	Giada De Laurentiis	Lola	Seattle, WA
1	EV0101	Totally Fried	Tempura Bacon (Discontinued)	Ted Allen	The Red Cat (Closed)	New York, NY
1	EV0101	Totally Fried	Spicy Pork Rinds	Michael Symon	Publican	Chicago, IL
1	EV0101	Totally Fried	Fried Brussels Sprouts	Aarón Sánchez	Lolita	Cleveland, OH
1	EV0101	Totally Fried	Mofongo	Guy Fieri	Benny's Seafood	South Miami, FL
2	EV0102	Bar-B-Que	BBQ Beef Brisket	Ted Allen	North Main BBQ	Euless, TX
2	EV0102	Bar-B-Que	BBQ Chicken	Adam Gertler	Dinosaur Bar B Que	Syracuse, NY
2	EV0102	Bar-B-Que	BBQ Shrimp	Alex Guarnaschelli	Pascal's Manale	New Orleans, LA
2	EV0102	Bar-B-Que	BBQ Pulled Pork Sandwich	Tyler Florence	Charlie Vergo's Rendezvous	Memphis, TN
2	EV0102	Bar-B-Que	BBQ Pork Ribs	Delilah Winder	Ronnie's Ribs, Wings and Other Things (Closed)	Richmond, VA
2	EV0102	Bar-B-Que	BBQ Beef Ribs	Michael Symon	Daisy May's (Closed)	New York, NY
2	EV0102	Bar-B-Que	Baked BBQ Pork Buns	Chris Cosentino	Yank Sing	San Francisco, CA
2	EV0102	Bar-B-Que	BBQ Combo Plate and BBQ Beef Ribs	Duff Goldman and Bobby Flay	The Salt Lick	Driftwood, TX
3	EV0103	With Bacon	Bacon Burger	Guy Fieri	Hodad's	San Diego, CA
3	EV0103	With Bacon	Office Burger	Adam Gertler	Father's Office	Los Angeles, CA
3	EV0103	With Bacon	House Smoked Bacon Flatbread	Aida Mollenkamp	Nopa	San Francisco, CA
3	EV0103	With Bacon	Salumi Cone	Tyler Florence	Boccalone Salumeria	San Francisco
3	EV0103	With Bacon	Bacon Apple Maple Donuts	Chris Consentino	Dynamo Donut and Coffee	San Francisco
3	EV0103	With Bacon	BLT	Ted Allen	Choice Market	Brooklyn, NY
3	EV0103	With Bacon	Angry Mussels	Delilah Wilder	JCT Kitchen	Atlanta, GA
3	EV0103	With Bacon	Bacon Chocolate Crunch Bar	Duff Goldman	Animal	Los Angeles
4	EV0104	Sugar Rush	CMP (Chocolate Marshmallow and Peanuts)	Duff Goldman	Woodberry Kitchen	Baltimore, Maryland
4	EV0104	Sugar Rush	Sam's Sundae	Aida Mollenkamp	Bi-Rite Creamery	San Francisco
4	EV0104	Sugar Rush	Toasted Marshmallow Shake	Michael Symon	Stand (Closed)	New York, NY
4	EV0104	Sugar Rush	Chocolate Bar Dessert	Cat Cora	Tru	Chicago, IL
4	EV0104	Sugar Rush	Golden Delicious Apple Tart	Alex Guarnaschelli	Al Forno	Providence, RI
4	EV0104	Sugar Rush	S'Mores	Sandra Lee	Luna Park	Los Angeles, CA
4	EV0104	Sugar Rush	Pecan Pie	John T. Edge	Brigtsen's Restaurant	New Orleans, Louisiana
4	EV0104	Sugar Rush	Chocolate Hazelnut Purse	Giada De Laurentiis	Riva Restaurant	Santa Monica, California
5	EV0105	Pizza	Arugula and Parmesan Pizza	Ted Allen	Graziella's	Brooklyn, NY
5	EV0105	Pizza	Sausage Patty Style Pizza	Duff Goldman	Gino's East	Chicago
5	EV0105	Pizza	Yukon Gold Potato Pizza	Alex Guarnaschelli	Five Points	New York, NY
5	EV0105	Pizza	Breakfast Pizza	Adam Gertler	Little Dom's	Los Angeles
5	EV0105	Pizza	Rosa Pizza	John T. Edge	Pizzeria Bianco	Phoenix, Arizona
5	EV0105	Pizza	Chocolate Pizza	Aarón Sánchez	Max Brenner	New York, NY
5	EV0105	Pizza	Margherita Pizza	Marc Summers	Osteria	Philadelphia, PA
5	EV0105	Pizza	Roasted Chanterelles Truffle Cheese Pizza	Tyler Florence	Serious Pie	Seattle, WA
6	EV0106	Obsessions	Stone Crabs	Bobby Flay	Joe's Stone Crab	Miami, FL
6	EV0106	Obsessions	Creamy Rice	Aarón Sánchez	Zarela (Closed)	New York, NY
6	EV0106	Obsessions	New York Strip Steak	Cat Cora	Lucky's	Montecito, CA
6	EV0106	Obsessions	Fried Buffalo Wings	Aaron McCargo Jr.	The Jug Handle Inn	Cinnaminson, NJ
6	EV0106	Obsessions	Linguini With Clams And Mussels In Saffron Broth	Danny Boome	Tree Bistro	New York, NY
6	EV0106	Obsessions	Kumamoto Oysters	Tyler Florence	Hog Island Oyster Co.	San Francisco, CA
6	EV0106	Obsessions	Triple Coconut Cream Pie	Delilah Wilder	Ritz Seafood	Voorhees, NJ
6	EV0106	Obsessions	Lemon-Scallion Dungeness Crab Cakes	Giada DeLaurentiis	Dahlia Lounge	Seattle
7	EV0107	Wake Up Call	Peanut Butter and Banana Stuffed French Toast	Bobby Flay	Café 222	San Diego, California
7	EV0107	Wake Up Call	Cinnamon Rolls	Ted Allen	Ann Sather	Chicago
7	EV0107	Wake Up Call	Ricotta Blueberry Pancakes	Aida Mollenkamp	BLD	Los Angeles, CA
7	EV0107	Wake Up Call	Wicked Spicy Hot Chocolate	Giada De Laurentiis	Jacques Torres	New York, NY
7	EV0107	Wake Up Call	The Chop and Chick	Guy Fieri	Matt's Big Breakfast	Phoenix, Arizona
7	EV0107	Wake Up Call	Pasta Mama	Susan Feniger	Hugo's	Los Angeles
7	EV0107	Wake Up Call	Corned Beef Hash	Michael Symon	Big Al's Diner	Cleveland, OH
7	EV0107	Wake Up Call	Huevos Montelenos	Duff Goldman	Golden West Café	Baltimore, MD
8	EV0108	Between Bread	Polish Boy	Michael Symon	Seti's Truck	Cleveland, Ohio
8	EV0108	Between Bread	Classic Bánh Mì and Pork Chop Bánh Mì	Anne Burrell and Aarón Sánchez	Nicky's Vietnamese Sandwiches	New York, NY
8	EV0108	Between Bread	Steakburger	Marc Summers	Steak 'n Shake	Various locations
8	EV0108	Between Bread	#19-Pastrami Sandwich	Adam Gertler	Langer's Deli	Los Angeles
8	EV0108	Between Bread	Bacon and Marmalade Sandwich	Chris Cosentino	Prune	New York, NY
8	EV0108	Between Bread	Cheese Steak	Aaron McCargo Jr.	Carmen's Deli	Bellmawr, New Jersey
8	EV0108	Between Bread	Cheese Steak	Aaron McCargo Jr.	Yellow Submarine	Maple Shade Township, New Jersey
8	EV0108	Between Bread	Godmother Sandwich	Susan Feniger and Mary Sue Milliken	Bay Cities Italian Deli & Bakery	Santa Monica, California
8	EV0108	Between Bread	52Chaps Submarine	Guy Fieri and Duff Goldman	Chap's Pit Beef	Baltimore, Maryland
9	EV0109	With My Hands	Fried Chicken	Guy Fieri	Uncle Lou's	Memphis, TN
9	EV0109	With My Hands	Panzarotti	Aaron McCargo Jr.	Panzarotti Pizza King	Camden, NJ
9	EV0109	With My Hands	Sliders (Cheeseburgers)	Michael Psilakis	White Manna	Hackensack, NJ
9	EV0109	With My Hands	Dip Sum Donuts	Marc Summers	Buddakan	Philadelphia, Pennsylvania
9	EV0109	With My Hands	Deviled Eggs and Devils on Horseback	Danny Boome	The Spotted Pig	New York, NY
9	EV0109	With My Hands	Tacos	Aarón Sánchez	Chico's Tacos	El Paso, Texas
9	EV0109	With My Hands	Chocolate Coconut Cupcake	Alex Guarnaschelli	Joan's on Third	Los Angeles, CA
9	EV0109	With My Hands	Pupusa	Mary Sue Milliken	Sarita's Pupuseria	Los Angeles, CA
10	EV0110	Filled With Envy	An's Famous Garlic Noodles	Duff Goldman	Crustacean	Beverly Hills, CA
10	EV0110	Filled With Envy	Salmon Rillettes (Rillettes Aux Deux Saumons)	Tyler Florence	Bouchon	Yountville, CA
10	EV0110	Filled With Envy	Spicy Broccoli	Cat Cora	Olives, W Hotel	New York, NY
10	EV0110	Filled With Envy	Carne Asada a la Oaxaqueña	Alex Guarnaschelli	Frontera Grill	Chicago, IL
10	EV0110	Filled With Envy	Orecchiette	Michael Pslakis	I Trulli	New York, NY
10	EV0110	Filled With Envy	Roasted Cauliflower and Wild Mushroom Soup	Aaron McCargo Jr.	Bolete	Bethlehem, Pennsylvania
10	EV0110	Filled With Envy	Warm Sea Urchin with Dungeness Crab	Aida Mollenkamp	Anchor & Hope	San Francisco
10	EV0110	Filled With Envy	Shanghai Lobster	Sandra Lee	Chinois on Main	Santa Monica, CA

== Season 2 ==
Episode	Show Number	Topic	Item	Chef/Host	Restaurant	Location
1	EV201	Holiday	Barbecue	Alton Brown	Beachcomber BBQ & Grill	St. Simons Island, Georgia
1	EV201	Holiday	Seafood Cobb Salad	Tyler Florence	The Rotunda at Neiman-Marcus	San Francisco
1	EV201	Holiday	Elvis Panini	Claire Robinson	The Patterson House	Nashville, TN
1	EV201	Holiday	Pannetone Milanese	Giada de Laurentiis	Emporio Rulli	Larkspur, CA
1	EV201	Holiday	Saffron Bigoli with Duck Ragou	Art Smith	Boka Restaurant	Chicago, IL
1	EV201	Holiday	Warm Indian Pudding	Alex Guarnaschelli	The Colonial Inn	Concord, MA
1	EV201	Holiday	Pernil	Aarón Sánchez	Casa Adela	New York, NY
1	EV201	Holiday	Peking Duck	Duff Goldman	Peking Gourmet Inn	Falls Church, VA
2	EV202	Hometown Favorites	Umami	Giada De Laurentiis	Umami Burger	Hollywood, CA
2	EV202	Hometown Favorites	Cosmic Dog	Alton Brown	Jack's Cosmic Dog	Mt. Pleasant, South Carolina
2	EV202	Hometown Favorites	Sweet Potato Cobbler	Pat Neely and Gina Neely	Alcenia's	Memphis, Tennessee
2	EV202	Hometown Favorites	Stuffed Quahog	Duff Goldman	Marshland	Sandwich, Massachusetts
2	EV202	Hometown Favorites	Pasta Bolognese	Ina Garten	Vine Street Cafe	Shelter Island, NY
2	EV202	Hometown Favorites	Spinach Pizza	Adam Gertler	Chefs of New York	East Northport, NY
2	EV202	Hometown Favorites	Hash	Sunny Anderson	Duke's Bar B-Que	Orangeburg, SC
2	EV202	Hometown Favorites	Kale Soup	Emeril Lagasse	St. John's Club	Fall River, MA
3	EV203	Cheesy	Grilled Cheese Sandwich	Ina Garten	E.A.T.	New York, NY
3	EV203	Cheesy	French Onion Soup	Beau MacMillan	Zinc Bistro	Scottsdale, Arizona
3	EV203	Cheesy	Cheeseburger	Ryan D'Agostino	Shady Glen Dairy	Manchester, Connecticut
3	EV203	Cheesy	Macaroni and Cheese	Sunny Anderson	Cafe des Artistes	Los Angeles, CA
3	EV203	Cheesy	Cheese Fondue	Rocco DiSpirito	Artisanal Bistro	New York, NY
3	EV203	Cheesy	Cheese Souffle	Alex Guarnaschelli	Le Goulue	Bal Harbour, FL
3	EV203	Cheesy	Crabmeat Au Gratin	John Besh	Bon Ton Cafe	New Orleans, LA
3	EV203	Cheesy	Lasagna Verde	Giada De Laurentiis	Angelini Osteria	Los Angeles, CA
4	EV204	Salty Goodness	Egg and Pork Belly Confit	Tyler Florence	Bottega	Yountville, California
4	EV204	Salty Goodness	Kouing Aman	Pat Neely and Gina Neely	Les Madeleines	Salt Lake City, Utah
4	EV204	Salty Goodness	Caesar Salad	Alex Guarnaschelli	Pietro's	New York, NY
4	EV204	Salty Goodness	Fried Country Ham	Alton Brown	The Dillard House	Dillard, GA
4	EV204	Salty Goodness	Tsar Nicoulai Sampler	Aarón Sánchez	Tsar Nicoulai, Ferry Building	San Francisco, CA
4	EV204	Salty Goodness	Sweet and Salty Brownie	Claire Robinson	Baked	Brooklyn, NY
4	EV204	Salty Goodness	Cyprus Breakfast	Ryan D'Agostino	Kanella	Philadelphia, PA
4	EV204	Salty Goodness	Beef Jerky	Michael Symon	Czuchraj Meats	Cleveland, OH
5	EV205	Meat-Fest	Leg of Beast	Aarón Sánchez	Incanto (Closed)	San Francisco, CA
5	EV205	Meat-Fest	Bar-B-Q Beef Sandwich	Cat Cora	Cold Spring Tavern	Santa Barbara, CA
5	EV205	Meat-Fest	Roast Suckling Pig	Adam Gertler	Amada	Philadelphia, PA
5	EV205	Meat-Fest	Lamb Shank	Duff Goldman	Sardinia Enoteca Restaurante	Miami Beach, FL
5	EV205	Meat-Fest	Costina	Anne Burrell	Salumeria Rosi Parmacotto	New York, NY
5	EV205	Meat-Fest	The No. 7 Half Chicken	Ted Allen	No. 7	Brooklyn, NY
5	EV205	Meat-Fest	Italian Beef and Sausage Sandwich	Ray Lampe	Joe Boston's Italian Beef	Chicago, IL
5	EV205	Meat-Fest	Large Format Feast (Spring Goat)	Michael Symon	Resto	New York, NY
6	EV206	Snack Attack	Pickles	Ted Allen	McClure's Pickles	Troy, MI
6	EV206	Snack Attack	Halfsteak Nachos (Discontinued)	Anne Burrell	Craftsteak	New York, NY
6	EV206	Snack Attack	Donut Muffin	Candace Nelson	Downtown Bakery	Healdsburg, CA
6	EV206	Snack Attack	Fish Tacos	Curtis Stone	Paia Fish Market	Paia, HI
6	EV206	Snack Attack	Short Rib Tacos	Adam Gertler	Kogi BBQ	Los Angeles, CA
6	EV206	Snack Attack	Shrimp and Heirloom Tomato Pizzette	Art Smith	Socca	Chicago, IL
6	EV206	Snack Attack	Lamb Skewers	Alex Guarnaschelli	A.O.C.	Los Angeles, CA
6	EV206	Snack Attack	Bar Nuts	Giada De Laurentiis	Union Square Cafe	New York, NY
7	EV207	Chocolate	Chocolate Pudding	Alton Brown	Hominy Grill	Charleston, SC
7	EV207	Chocolate	Chocolate Souffle	Alex Guarnaschelli	Etats-Unis (Closed)	New York, NY
7	EV207	Chocolate	S'More Pie	Tyler Florence	Buckeye Roadhouse	Mill Valley, CA
7	EV207	Chocolate	Enchiladas de Mole Poblano con Pollo (Chicken Mole)	Duff Goldman	Loteria Grill	Los Angeles, CA
7	EV207	Chocolate	Creme Brulee Chocolate	Claire Robinson	Kee's Chocolates	New York, NY
7	EV207	Chocolate	Dark Chocolate Chocolate Chip Cookies	Rocco DiSpirito	Levain Bakery	New York, NY
7	EV207	Chocolate	White Chocolate Flan	Art Smith	May Street Bakery	Chicago, IL
7	EV207	Chocolate	Chocolate Tasting Menu	Aarón Sánchez	Jean Georges	New York, NY
8	EV208	Crunchy	Onion Rings	Duff Goldman	Akasha	Culver City, CA
8	EV208	Crunchy	Fried Chicken	Michael Psilakis	Blue Ribbon at Brooklyn Bowl	Brooklyn, NY
8	EV208	Crunchy	Indonesian Corn Fritters	Brian Boitano	E&O Trading Company	San Francisco, CA
8	EV208	Crunchy	Peach Raspberry Crumb Pie	Alex Guarnaschelli	Beach Bakery Cafe	Westhampton Beach, NY
8	EV208	Crunchy	Egg Rolls	Claire Robinson	Chinatown Brasserie	New York, NY
8	EV208	Crunchy	Caramel Corn	Candace Nelson	Arclight Cinemas	Los Angeles, CA
8	EV208	Crunchy	Black Bass	Ted Allen	Le Bernardin	New York, NY
8	EV208	Crunchy	Flo's Fried Clam Roll	Chris Cosentino	Flo's Clam Shack	Middletown, Rhode Island
8	EV208	Crunchy	Fresh Fish and Chips	Beau MacMillan	Flo's Clam Shack	Middletown, Rhode Island
9	EV209	The Classics	Chicken Pot Pie	Giada De Laurentiis	WoodSpoon	Los Angeles
9	EV209	The Classics	Banana Cupcakes	Ted Allen	Butter Lane	New York, NY
9	EV209	The Classics	Mashed Potatoes	Robert Irvine	Parc	Philadelphia, PA
9	EV209	The Classics	Chili Dog	Marc Summers	Carneys	Los Angeles, CA
9	EV209	The Classics	Blackened Louisiana Drum	Aarón Sánchez	K-Paul's Louisiana Kitchen	New Orleans, LA
9	EV209	The Classics	Meatloaf	Ina Garten	The 1770 House	East Hampton, NY
9	EV209	The Classics	Prime Rib	Brian Boitano	House of Prime Rib	San Francisco, CA
9	EV209	The Classics	Veal Parmigiano	Emeril Lagasse	Il Vagabondo	New York, NY
10	EV210	Guilty Pleasures	Gravy Frites	Michael Symon	The Greenhouse Tavern	Cleveland, OH
10	EV210	Guilty Pleasures	Bread Pudding	Sunny Anderson	Mother's Restaurant	New Orleans, LA
10	EV210	Guilty Pleasures	Clam Chowdah	Beau MacMillan	Cabby Shack	Plymouth, MA
10	EV210	Guilty Pleasures	Strip House Chocolate Cake	Michael Psilakis	Strip House Steak House	New York, NY
10	EV210	Guilty Pleasures	Quiche Lorraine	Donatella Arpaia	Bouchon Bakery	New York, NY
10	EV210	Guilty Pleasures	Surf and Turf	Claire Robinson	Restaurant Iris	Memphis, Tennessee
10	EV210	Guilty Pleasures	Bar B Q Pizza	Lisa Lillien	Pete and Sam's Restaurant	Memphis, Tennessee
10	EV210	Guilty Pleasures	Baltimore Bomb Pie	Duff Goldman	Dangerously Delicious Pies	Baltimore, MD
11	EV211	Hot and Spicy	Hot and Spicy Crab	Tyler Florence	Penang Garden	San Francisco
11	EV211	Hot and Spicy	Jambalaya Pasta	Pat Neely and Gina Neely	Raz'z Bar and Grill	Nashville, Tennessee
11	EV211	Hot and Spicy	Queen City Cayenne Ice Cream	Ryan D'Agostino	Jeni's Splendid Ice Creams	Columbus, Ohio
11	EV211	Hot and Spicy	Crying Tiger Pork	Curtis Stone	Jitlada	Los Angeles
11	EV211	Hot and Spicy	Shrimp and Swordfish Curry	Ina Garten	Loaves & Fishes	Sagaponack, New York
11	EV211	Hot and Spicy	Rice Noodles with Hominy, Kimchi, and Spicy Pork Broth	Art Smith	Urban Belly	Chicago
11	EV211	Hot and Spicy	Shrimp Cocktail	Ray Lampe	St. Elmo's Steak House	Indianapolis, IN
11	EV211	Hot and Spicy	Mircha Ka Salan	Ted Allen	Devi	New York, NY
12	EV212	Totally Unexpected	Sage and Bleu Cheese Guacamole	Michael Symon	Lopez Southwestern Kitchen	Cleveland, Ohio
12	EV212	Totally Unexpected	Deep Fried Candy Bar	Sunny Anderson	A Salt & Battery	New York, NY
12	EV212	Totally Unexpected	Eggs Rose	Cat Cora	D'Angelo Bread	Santa Barbara, California
12	EV212	Totally Unexpected	Prosciutto Ice Cream	Chris Cosentino	Humphry Slocombe	San Francisco, CA
12	EV212	Totally Unexpected	Liverwurst	Michael Psilakis	The Modern	New York, NY
12	EV212	Totally Unexpected	Soutzoukakia	Aaron McCargo Jr.	Evvia Estiatorio	Palo Alto, California
12	EV212	Totally Unexpected	Glazed Eel	Claire Robinson	The Monday Room	New York, NY
12	EV212	Totally Unexpected	Fried Black-Eyed Peas	Alton Brown	Relish	Roswell, Georgia
13	EV213	Chilled Perfection	SRG Eskimo Bars	Giada De Laurentiis	Snake River Grill	Jackson Hole, WY
13	EV213	Chilled Perfection	Liliko'i Creme Brulee	Marc Summers	Mama's Fish House	Paia, HI
13	EV213	Chilled Perfection	Lemon Ice Box Pie	Cat Cora	Crystal Grill	Greenwood, MS
13	EV213	Chilled Perfection	Fire and Ice Ceviche	Curtis Stone	Ola @ The Sanctuary Hotel	Miami Beach, FL
13	EV213	Chilled Perfection	Ice Cream Sandwich	Donatella Arpaia	Piatianni Ristorante	Brooklyn, NY
13	EV213	Chilled Perfection	Egg Salad Sandwich	Adam Gertler	Euro Pane	Pasadena, CA
13	EV213	Chilled Perfection	Fluent in French Toast Rice Pudding	Lisa Lillien	Rice to Riches	New York, NY
13	EV213	Chilled Perfection	Lobster Roll	Duff Goldman	PJ's Family Restaurant	Wellfleet, MA

== Season 3 ==
Episode	Show Number	Topic	Item	Chef/Host	Restaurant	Location
1	EV301	Grilled	Mongolian Pork Chop	Bobby Flay	Mustard's Grill	Napa, CA
1	EV301	Grilled	Grilled Oysters	Adam Gertler	Drago's Seafood Restaurant	Metairie, LA
1	EV301	Grilled	Australian Lamb Chops	Ted Allen	Rathbun's	Atlanta, GA
1	EV301	Grilled	Tomahawk Chop	Duff Goldman	Lonesome Dove Western Bistro	Fort Worth, TX
1	EV301	Grilled	Grilled Filet of Beef with Crusted Coffee Adobado	Michael Chiarello	RDG Grill + Bar Annie	Houston, TX
1	EV301	Grilled	Korean BBQ Beef Short Ribs	Beau MacMillan	Chosun Galbee	Los Angeles, CA
1	EV301	Grilled	Grilled Diver Scallops	Cat Cora	The Ranch House	Ojai, California
1	EV301	Grilled	Pork Rib Tips	Guy Fieri	Tom's Bar B Q & Deli	Memphis, Tennessee
2	EV302	Simply Irresistible	Sticky Buns	Bobby Flay	Flour Bakery & Cafe	Boston, Massachusetts
2	EV302	Simply Irresistible	Spicy Sweet Potato Fries	Cat Cora	Beano's Cabin	Avon, CO
2	EV302	Simply Irresistible	Grilled Cheese with Short Ribs	Adam Gertler	The Foundry on Melrose	Los Angeles, CA
2	EV302	Simply Irresistible	Toro Tartare	Duff Goldman	Morimoto	New York, NY
2	EV302	Simply Irresistible	Boudin Sausage	Chris Cosentino	Cochon Butcher	New Orleans, LA
2	EV302	Simply Irresistible	Whole Roasted Chicken	Alex Guarnaschelli	Craigie on Main	Cambridge, MA
2	EV302	Simply Irresistible	Red Wattle Country Chop	Frank Bruni	Vinegar Hill House	Brooklyn, NY
2	EV302	Simply Irresistible	Crab Cioppino	Guy Fieri	Duarte's Tavern	Pescadero, CA
3	EV303	Regional Favorites	Pierogi	Michael Symon	Sokolowski's	Cleveland, OH
3	EV303	Regional Favorites	Shrimp Po Boy	Alex Guarnaschelli	Domilise's Restaurant	New Orleans, LA
3	EV303	Regional Favorites	Boston Cream Pie	Beau MacMillan	Omni Parker House	Boston, MA
3	EV303	Regional Favorites	Pimento Cheese with Flatbread	Tyler Florence	Magnolias	Charleston, SC
3	EV303	Regional Favorites	Cheesesteak	Marc Summers	Tony Luke's	Philadelphia, PA
3	EV303	Regional Favorites	Shore Dinner	Michael Psilakis	Young's Lobster Pound	Belfast, ME
3	EV303	Regional Favorites	Musubi	Aida Mollenkamp	Mana Bu's	Honolulu, HI
3	EV303	Regional Favorites	Hot Wieners	Guy Fieri	Olneyville NY System	Providence, RI
4	EV304	Sweet Tooth	Concrete (Frozen Custard)	Bobby Flay	Ted Drewes	Saint Louis, Missouri
4	EV304	Sweet Tooth	PB&J Doughnut	Pat Neely and Gina Neely	Doughnut Plant	New York, NY
4	EV304	Sweet Tooth	Passion Fruit Trifle	Robert Irvine	Atlantic Seafood Company	Alpharetta, Georgia
4	EV304	Sweet Tooth	Vanilla Cream Meringue Cake (Meringata Alla Crema)	Claire Robinson	Cipriani	New York, NY
4	EV304	Sweet Tooth	Nutella Crepe with Strawberry and Banana	Beau MacMillan	FlipHappy Crepes	Austin, Texas
4	EV304	Sweet Tooth	Sant Ambroeus (Chocolate Mousse Cake)	Rocco DiSpirito	Sant Ambroeus	New York, NY
4	EV304	Sweet Tooth	Double Pain Au Chocolat	David Myers	Tartine Bakery	San Francisco
4	EV304	Sweet Tooth	Popcorn and Peanuts	Michael Symon	Michael's Genuine	Miami, Florida
4	EV304	Sweet Tooth	Tangerine Creamsicle/Homemade Poptarts	Scott Conant	Michael's Genuine	Miami, Florida
4	EV304	Sweet Tooth	Homemade Poptarts	Frank Bruni	Michael's Genuine	Miami, FL
5	EV305	Burgers	Cheeseburger	Bobby Flay	J.G. Melon	New York, NY
5	EV305	Burgers	Buffalo Style Burger Crunchified	Claire Robinson	Bobby's Burger Palace	Paramus, NJ
5	EV305	Burgers	Cricket Burger with Green Chili	Aarón Sánchez	The Cherry Cricket	Denver, CO
5	EV305	Burgers	Phat Burger with Bacon and Cheese	Tyler Florence	Pearl's Phat Burgers	Mill Valley, California
5	EV305	Burgers	Double Cheeseburger	Anne Burrell	Holeman & Finch Public House	Atlanta, Georgia
5	EV305	Burgers	Chargrilled Lamb Burger	Frank Bruni	The Breslin (Closed)	New York, NY
5	EV305	Burgers	The Original Burger	Geoffrey Zakarian	Louis' Lunch	New Haven, CT
5	EV305	Burgers	Farmhouse Veggie Burger	Duff Goldman	Farm Cafe	Portland, OR
6	EV306	Appetizers	Lasagnette con Ragu di Crostacei	Bobby Flay	Bartolotta	Las Vegas, NV
6	EV306	Appetizers	French Onion Soup Dumplings	Claire Robinson	The Stanton Social (Closed)	New York, NY
6	EV306	Appetizers	Shrimp and Alligator Sausage Cheesecake	Adam Gertler	Jacques-Imo's Café	New Orleans, LA
6	EV306	Appetizers	Popovers	Tyler Florence	BLT Steak	New York, NY
6	EV306	Appetizers	Egg Yolk Carpaccio	Scott Conant	Sra. Martinez	Miami, FL
6	EV306	Appetizers	Hot Potato Cold Potato	Ted Allen	Alinea	Chicago, IL
6	EV306	Appetizers	Calamari	Melissa d'Arabian	Purple Café and Wine Bar	Kirkland, WA
6	EV306	Appetizers	Burgundy Snails	Duff Goldman	Charleston	Baltimore, MD
7	EV307	In a Bowl	Hand Pulled Noodles with Beef	Guy Fieri	Tasty Hand-Pulled Noodle	New York, NY
7	EV307	In a Bowl	Chorizo-Stuffed Dates	Chris Cosentino	Avec	Chicago, IL
7	EV307	In a Bowl	Potato Gnocchi with Blue Crab and Périgord Truffle	Aarón Sánchez	Restaurant August	New Orleans, LA
7	EV307	In a Bowl	Tiramisu a la Mexicana	Robert Irvine	Lolita	Philadelphia, PA
7	EV307	In a Bowl	Ukrainian Borscht	Ted Allen	Veselka	New York, NY
7	EV307	In a Bowl	Organic Granola with Fruit and Straus Organic Yogurt	Tyler Florence	Cafe Fanny	Berkeley, California
7	EV307	In a Bowl	Mushroom Miso Soup	Alex Guarnaschelli	Miyake Restaurant	Portland, Maine
7	EV307	In a Bowl	Chili	Sunny Anderson	Real Chili	Milwaukee, WI
7	EV307	In a Bowl	Chili	Duff Goldman	National Coney Island	Detroit, Michigan
8	EV308	Hidden Treasures	Grilled Cheese and Tomato Soup	Tyler Florence	Muir Woods Trading Company Cafe	Mill Valley, California
8	EV308	Hidden Treasures	Lau Lau	Sunny Anderson	Kaaloa's Super J's	Captain Cook, Hawaii
8	EV308	Hidden Treasures	Falafel Omelet Hoagie	Robert Irvine	A&M Halal	Philadelphia, PA
8	EV308	Hidden Treasures	Sizzling Bacon	Michael Psilakis	Peter Luger Steak House	Brooklyn, NY
8	EV308	Hidden Treasures	Paris Texas Tacos	Adam Gertler	Good To Go Tacos	Dallas, TX
8	EV308	Hidden Treasures	Burger	Cat Cora	The Hitching Post II	Buellton, California
8	EV308	Hidden Treasures	Kalamata	Beau MacMillan	Queen Creek Olive Mill	Queen Creek, Arizona
8	EV308	Hidden Treasures	Fried Chicken	Ted Allen	Table 52	Chicago
9	EV309	Sauced	Spaghetti	Ted Allen	Scarpetta	New York, NY
9	EV309	Sauced	Sticky Toffee Pudding with Bourbon Ice Cream	Claire Robinson	Colt and Gray	Denver, CO
9	EV309	Sauced	Hanger Steak with Agrodolce Sauce	Alex Guarnaschelli	FIG	Charleston, SC
9	EV309	Sauced	Rib Tips	Aarón Sánchez	Daddy D'z BBQ Joynt	Atlanta, GA
9	EV309	Sauced	Comeback Sauce	Cat Cora	Mayflower Cafe	Jackson, MS
9	EV309	Sauced	Linguini with Clams	Michael Psilakis	Don Peppe	Ozone Park, NY
9	EV309	Sauced	Duck in Red Peanut Mole Sauce	Michael Chiarello	Topolobampo	Chicago, IL
9	EV309	Sauced	Fish with Tamarind Sauce	Duff Goldman	Ambassador Dining Room	Baltimore, MD
10	EV310	With Fruit	Green Papaya Salad	Chris Cosentino	Out The Door	San Francisco, CA
10	EV310	With Fruit	Apple Strudel	Aida Mollenkamp	Schmidt's	San Francisco
10	EV310	With Fruit	Candied Orange Peel/Chocolate	Pat Neely and Gina Neely	Cristina's Restaurant	Ketchum, Idaho
10	EV310	With Fruit	Poco Carretto Fruit Sorbet	Melissa d'Arabian	Cafe Juanita	Kirkland, Washington
10	EV310	With Fruit	Bananas Foster Cake	Jeff Henderson	Bradley Ogden	Las Vegas, NV
10	EV310	With Fruit	Guava Pastries	Aarón Sánchez	Versailles	Miami, FL
10	EV310	With Fruit	Fried Pineapple-Wrapped Speck	Michael Chiarello	Frasca	Boulder, Colorado
10	EV310	With Fruit	Duck Breast with Fruit Compote	Ted Allen	Locanda Vini & Olli	Brooklyn, NY
11	EV311	Sliced	Colatura Di Alici Pizza	Rachael Ray	Motorino	Brooklyn, NY
11	EV311	Sliced	Olallieberry Pie	Marc Summers	Linn's of Cambria	Cambria, CA
11	EV311	Sliced	Gyro with Feta Cream Sauce	Cat Cora	Keifers Restaurant	Jackson, MS
11	EV311	Sliced	BLT Salad with Fried Green Tomatoes	Aarón Sánchez	The Olde Pink House	Savannah, Georgia
11	EV311	Sliced	Gaspe Nove	Michael Psilakis	Russ & Daughters	New York, NY
11	EV311	Sliced	Smetannik (Sour Cream Cake)	Alex Guarnaschelli	Bakery La Brioche Cafe	New York, NY
11	EV311	Sliced	Grilled Mushroom Stack	Frank Bruni	O-Ya Restaurant	Boston, Massachusetts
11	EV311	Sliced	Charcuterie de la Maison	Duff Goldman	Church & State	Los Angeles
12	EV312	Last Supper	Chef's Pasta Tasting Menu	Michael Symon	Vetri Ristorante	Philadelphia, Pennsylvania
12	EV312	Last Supper	Oysters and Pearls	Cat Cora	French Laundry	Yountville, California
12	EV312	Last Supper	Lobster Tail & Sfogliatella	Alex Guarnaschelli	Ferrara Bakery	New York, NY
12	EV312	Last Supper	Pressed Duck (Discontinued)	Ted Allen	Daniel NYC	New York, NY
12	EV312	Last Supper	Chopped Pork BBQ Sandwich	Claire Robinson	Paynes BBQ	Memphis, TN
12	EV312	Last Supper	Pizza	Rocco DiSpirito	Umberto's of New Hyde Park	New Hyde Park, New York
12	EV312	Last Supper	Pan-Fried Chicken	Simon Majumdar	Stroud's Restaurant & Bar	Fairway, Kansas
13	EV313	Best Thing I Ever Drank	Lime Fizz	Michael Symon	Velvet Tango Room	Cleveland, Ohio
13	EV313	Best Thing I Ever Drank	Grapefruit Margarita	Claire Robinson	Barrio Chino	New York, NY
13	EV313	Best Thing I Ever Drank	Lobster Scallion Shooters	Melissa d'Arabian	Abacus	Dallas, Texas
13	EV313	Best Thing I Ever Drank	Irish Coffee	Tyler Florence	The Buena Vista Cafe	San Francisco
13	EV313	Best Thing I Ever Drank	Kyoto Ice Coffee	Chris Cosentino	Blue Bottle Coffee Company	Oakland, California
13	EV313	Best Thing I Ever Drank	Gin Blossom	Ted Allen	Clover Club	Brooklyn, NY
13	EV313	Best Thing I Ever Drank	Herbaceous Mojito	Anne Burrell	Daddy O's Bar	New York, NY
13	EV313	Best Thing I Ever Drank	Chocolate Soda	Marc Summers	The Franklin Fountain Ice Cream	Philadelphia, PA
13	EV313	Best Thing I Ever Drank	Egyptian Egg Soda	Duff Goldman	The Franklin Fountain Ice Cream	Philadelphia, PA

== Season 4 ==
Episode	Show Number	Topic	Item	Chef/Host	Restaurant	Location
1	EV0401	Close to Home	Harvest Pizza	Rachael Ray	The Harvest	Queensbury, NY
1	EV0401	Close to Home	Char Dog	Ted Allen	The Wiener's Circle	Chicago, IL
1	EV0401	Close to Home	Beef Machaca	Aarón Sánchez	Kiki's Mexican Restaurant	El Paso, Texas
1	EV0401	Close to Home	Whole Branzino Roasted in Sea Salt	Wolfgang Puck	Angelini Osteria	Los Angeles
1	EV0401	Close to Home	Coconut Layer Cake	Anne Burrell	Smith & Wollensky	New York, NY
1	EV0401	Close to Home	Peppered Beef Sandwich	Marc Summers	Shapiro's Deli	Indianapolis, Indiana
1	EV0401	Close to Home	English Muffins	Michael Chiarello	Model Bakery	St. Helena, California
1	EV0401	Close to Home	French Onion Soup	Guy Fieri	Cricklewood	Santa Rosa, California
2	EV0402	Bang for the Buck	French Dipped Sandwiches	Wolfgang Puck	Philippe, The Original	Los Angeles
2	EV0402	Bang for the Buck	$6 Breakfast Happy Hour (Cured Pork Cheeks Confit Hash)	Melissa d'Arabian	Toulouse Petit	Seattle, Washington
2	EV0402	Bang for the Buck	$15 Chef's Tasting Menu (Four Courses)	Chris Cosentino	Mr. Pollo	San Francisco
2	EV0402	Bang for the Buck	$15 Steak Dinner (Monday Night Special)	Pat Neely & Gina Neely	The Butcher Shop Steak House	Memphis, Tennessee
2	EV0402	Bang for the Buck	The Gambler's Special	Eric Greenspan	Mr. Lucky's 24/7	Las Vegas, Nevada
2	EV0402	Bang for the Buck	Sticky Buns	Beau MacMillan	El Chorro Lodge	Paradise Valley, Arizona
2	EV0402	Bang for the Buck	Philly Cheese Steak Sandwiches	Troy Johnson	Donovan's Steak & Chop House	San Diego, California
2	EV0402	Bang for the Buck	Bibim-Bop	Alton Brown	Hankook Taqueria	Atlanta, Georgia
3	EV0403	Nutty	White Chocolate Pretzel Peanut Spread	Tyler Florence	Spread (Closed)	San Diego, California
3	EV0403	Nutty	Knafeh	Sunny Anderson	Tanoreen	Brooklyn, New York
3	EV0403	Nutty	Marzipan	Ted Allen	Swedish Bakery	Chicago, IL
3	EV0403	Nutty	Boston Bibb & Mache Salad	Duff Goldman	Figs	Charlestown, MA
3	EV0403	Nutty	Dark Chocolate Dixies	Alex Guarnaschelli	Richardson' Candy Kitchen	Deerfield, Massachusetts
3	EV0403	Nutty	Aji De Gallina	Giada De Laurentiis	Mo-Chica	Los Angeles
3	EV0403	Nutty	Butter Pecan Ice Cream	Michael Psilakis	Brooklyn Ice Cream Factory	Brooklyn, New York
3	EV0403	Nutty	Coffee Macaron	Wolfgang Puck	Payard Patisserie	Las Vegas, NV
4	EV0404	At a Deli	Brisket	Duff Goldman	Edmart Deli	Pikesville, MD
4	EV0404	At a Deli	Noodle Kugel	Ted Allen	Manny's Cafeteria and Delicatessen	Chicago, IL
4	EV0404	At a Deli	Jimmy's Favorite	Claire Robinson	Jimmy & Drew's	Boulder, Colorado
4	EV0404	At a Deli	Corned Beef Sandwich	Marc Summers	Brent's Deli	Northridge, California
4	EV0404	At a Deli	Junk Yard Special	Adam Gertler	Sarcone's Deli	Philadelphia, Pennsylvania
4	EV0404	At a Deli	Everything Bagel	Rocco DiSpirito	Tal Bagels	New York, NY
4	EV0404	At a Deli	Beef on Weck	Geoffrey Zakarian	Charlie the Butcher's Kitchen	Williamsville, NY
4	EV0404	At a Deli	Chopped Herring Salad Sandwich	Alton Brown	Barney Greengrass	New York, NY
5	EV0405	Under Wraps	Crepes	Alton Brown	Creperie Beau Monde	Philadelphia, PA
5	EV0405	Under Wraps	Bacon Wrapped Lamb Chops	Rocco DiSpirito	Employees Only	New York, NY
5	EV0405	Under Wraps	Agnolotti	Sunny Anderson	Veni Vidi Vici	Atlanta, Georgia
5	EV0405	Under Wraps	Basteeya	Chris Cosentino	Aziza	San Francisco
5	EV0405	Under Wraps	Ripienone Calzone	Scott Conant	Fratelli La Bufala	Miami, Florida
5	EV0405	Under Wraps	Dolmades Yialantzi	Alex Guarnaschelli	Agnanti Restaurant	Astoria, NY
5	EV0405	Under Wraps	Squab with Lettuce	Chuck Hughes	Mr. Chow	Miami, FL
5	EV0405	Under Wraps	Chicken Tamales	Duff Goldman	Dorothy's Homemade Tamales	Hartsel, CO
6	EV0406	Cake Walk	Southern Red Velvet Cake	Ted Allen	Cake Man Raven	Brooklyn, New York
6	EV0406	Cake Walk	Mondrian Cake	Chris Cosentino	Blue Bottle Coffee at the SFMOMA Rooftop Sculpture Garden	San Francisco
6	EV0406	Cake Walk	Hoecakes	Tyler Florence	The Lady & Sons	Savannah, Georgia
6	EV0406	Cake Walk	Flourless Chocolate Cake	Aarón Sánchez	Cake Flour	Louisville, KY
6	EV0406	Cake Walk	Carmel Pecan Pound Cake	Pat Neely & Gina Neely	Chambers Cakes & Cookies	Kansas City, Missouri
6	EV0406	Cake Walk	Dulce De Leche Cake	Marcela Valladolid	Extraordinary Desserts	San Diego, California
6	EV0406	Cake Walk	Whoopie Pie	Chuck Hughes	Two Fat Cats Bakery	Portland, Maine
7	EV0407	With Chopsticks	Drunken Noodles with Chicken	Giada De Laurentiis	Wazuzu	Las Vegas, Nevada
7	EV0407	With Chopsticks	A&M Crispy Beef	Duff Goldman	Cafe Zen	Baltimore, Maryland
7	EV0407	With Chopsticks	Crispy Calamari Salad	Anne Burrell	The Continental	Philadelphia, PA
7	EV0407	With Chopsticks	Akamaru Modern Ramen	Claire Robinson	Ippudo	New York, NY
7	EV0407	With Chopsticks	Tempura Alaskan King Crab	Beau MacMillan	Yellowtail	Las Vegas, Nevada
7	EV0407	With Chopsticks	Slippery Shrimp	Adam Gertler	Yang Chow	Los Angeles
7	EV0407	With Chopsticks	Crispy Lamb Filets with Chili Cumin	Frank Bruni	Szechuan Gourmet	New York, NY
7	EV0407	With Chopsticks	Mock Eel	Alton Brown	A Single Pebble	Burlington, VT
8	EV0408	That I'm Thankful For	Pulled Turkey Sandwich	Claire Robinson	Hog Heaven	Nashville, Tennessee
8	EV0408	That I'm Thankful For	Sweet Potato Cheesecake	Jeff Henderson	Harriet's Cheesecakes	Inglewood, California
8	EV0408	That I'm Thankful For	Cranberry Preserves	Pat Neely & Gina Neely	Three Square Grill	Portland, Oregon
8	EV0408	That I'm Thankful For	Three-Course Turkey Dinner	Michael Psilakis	Gotham Bar and Grill	New York, NY
8	EV0408	That I'm Thankful For	Turkey Terrific Sandwich	Alex Guarnaschelli	Provisions	Nantucket, Massachusetts
8	EV0408	That I'm Thankful For	Mandoo Vegetable Dumplings	Cat Cora	Susan Feniger's Street	Los Angeles
8	EV0408	That I'm Thankful For	Smashing Pumpkin Martini	Troy Johnson	Grant Grill	San Diego, California
8	EV0408	That I'm Thankful For	Victoria Sandwich Cake	Robert Irvine	Tea & Sympathy	New York, NY
9	EV0409	Crazy Good	White Truffle Tagliatelle	Wolfgang Puck	Valentino	Santa Monica, California
9	EV0409	Crazy Good	Pizza with Mushrooms & Garlic	Sunny Anderson	Di Fara Pizza	Brooklyn, New York
9	EV0409	Crazy Good	Maple Budino	Frank Bruni	Locanda Verde	New York, NY
9	EV0409	Crazy Good	Banana Special	Duff Goldman	Fentons Creamery	Oakland, California
9	EV0409	Crazy Good	Pot Roast	Rocco DiSpirito	Jar	Los Angeles
9	EV0409	Crazy Good	Marin Joe's Special: Hamburger, Spinach & Egg	Tyler Florence	Marin Joe's	Corte Madera, California
9	EV0409	Crazy Good	Roast Duck	Simon Majumdar	Upperline Restaurant	New Orleans, Louisiana
9	EV0409	Crazy Good	Matterhorn Cake	Giada De Laurentiis	Sweet Surrender	Bakersfield, California
10	EV0410	With Garlic	Plague Bringer Burger	Adam Gertler	Kuma's Corner	Chicago, Illinois
10	EV0410	With Garlic	Spaghetti with Roasted Garlic Sauce	Melissa d'Arabian	Bove's Cafe	Burlington, VT
10	EV0410	With Garlic	Garlic Bread	Alex Guarnaschelli	Rosarios Ristorante	Boca Raton, FL
10	EV0410	With Garlic	Garlic Soup	Simon Majumdar	Bayona	New Orleans, LA
10	EV0410	With Garlic	Knoblewurst	Michael Psilakis	Katz's Deli	New York, NY
10	EV0410	With Garlic	Garlic Shrimp	Rocco DiSpirito	Schiller's Liquor Bar	New York, NY
10	EV0410	With Garlic	Garlic Naan	Eric Greenspan	Al-Noor	Lawndale, California
10	EV0410	With Garlic	Half Chicken with Garlic Sauce	Duff Goldman	Zankou Chicken	Los Angeles
11	EV0411	I Ever Made For The Holidays	Multiple Recipes By Hosts		No restaurants	No locations
12	EV0412	On A Stick	Mexican Grilled Corn	Tyler Florence	Cafe Habana	New York, NY
12	EV0412	On A Stick	Lollipop Trio	Adam Gertler	Stefan's at L.A. Farm	Santa Monica, California
12	EV0412	On A Stick	Corn Dog (Memorial Day, Fourth of July, and Labor Day only)	Claire Robinson	Shake Shack	Miami, Florida New York, NY Washington, DC
12	EV0412	On A Stick	Strawberry Ice Pop	Cat Cora	Mandarina (Closed)	San Francisco, California
12	EV0412	On A Stick	Chao Tom (Sugarcane Shrimp)	Simon Majumdar	Golden Deli	San Gabriel, California
12	EV0412	On A Stick	Caramel Apple	Alex Guarnaschelli	Charleston's Candy Kitchen	Charleston, South Carolina
12	EV0412	On A Stick	Meat Ball Yakitori (Chicken Meatball)	David Myers	Yakitoria	Los Angeles
12	EV0412	On A Stick	Insalata Caprese Injection	Giada De Laurentis	Minibar	Washington, DC
13	EV0413	For Brunch	Haute Pocket	Claire Robinson	Table 6	Denver, CO
13	EV0413	For Brunch	Chocolate Decadence French Toast	Alex Guarnaschelli	Norma's	New York, NY
13	EV0413	For Brunch	Waffle Dogs	Beau MacMillan	Over Easy	Scottsdale, Arizona
13	EV0413	For Brunch	Menudo	Aarón Sánchez	Garcia's Cafe	Carbondale, Colorado
13	EV0413	For Brunch	Croque Monsieur	Frank Bruni	Bar Boulud	New York, NY
13	EV0413	For Brunch	Bacon with Cheese Oven Baked Omelette	Melissa d'Arabian	Walker Bros. The Original Pancake House	Chicago
13	EV0413	For Brunch	Chilaquiles	Marcela Valladolid	Talavera Azul	Chula Vista, California
13	EV0413	For Brunch	Crab Cakes	Duff Goldman	Pierpoint Restaurant	Baltimore, Maryland
14	EV0414	Reinvented Classics	The Crab Roll	Tyler Florence	Fish	Sausalito, California
14	EV0414	Reinvented Classics	Lobster Pot Pie	Cat Cora	Academe Maine Brasserie & Tavern	Kennebunk, Maine
14	EV0414	Reinvented Classics	Devil-ish Eggs	Robert Irvine	Founding Farmers	Washington, DC
14	EV0414	Reinvented Classics	Cheesecake Lollipop Tree	Scott Conant	David Burke Townhouse	New York, NY
14	EV0414	Reinvented Classics	Pork Belly Cubano	Chris Cosentino	Bunk Sandwiches	Portland, Oregon
14	EV0414	Reinvented Classics	Fish Tacos	Aarón Sánchez	California Modern at Georges at the Cove	La Jolla, California
14	EV0414	Reinvented Classics	Eggs Benedict	Ted Allen	wd~50 (Closed)	New York, NY
14	EV0414	Reinvented Classics	Churros Con Cajeta	Giada De Laurentiis	La Casita Mexicana	Bell, California

== Season 5 ==
Episode	Show Number	Topic	Item	Chef/Host	Restaurant	Location
1	EV0501	Combos	Biscuits and Gravy	Michael Simon	Lucky's Cafe	Cleveland, OH
1	EV0501	Combos	Spaghetti and Meatballs (Sunday Only)	Anne Burrell	Extra Virgin	New York, NY
1	EV0501	Combos	Corned Beef and Cabbage	Adam Gertler	Franklin Cafe	Boston, MA
1	EV0501	Combos	Pastrami Reuben and Chicken Noodle Soup	Ted Allen	Katzinger's Delicatessen	Columbus, OH
1	EV0501	Combos	Beer-Battered Fish and Chips	Marc Summers	The Dandelion	Philadelphia, Pennsylvania
1	EV0501	Combos	Chicken and Waffles	Duff Goldman	Roscoe's House of Chicken 'N Waffles	Los Angeles
1	EV0501	Combos	Watermelon Pickle and Crispy Pork	Roger Mooking	Fatty Crab (Closed)	New York, NY
1	EV0501	Combos	Sugar on Snow	Alton Brown	Bragg Family Farm	East Montpelier, VT
2	EV0502	Fried Chicken	Fried Chicken	Alton Brown	The Old Country Store	Lorman, MS
2	EV0502	Fried Chicken	Fried Chicken	Claire Robinson	Gus's World Famous Hot & Spicy Fried Chicken	Mason, Tennessee
2	EV0502	Fried Chicken	Golden Brown Southern Fried Chicken	Beau MacMillan	Mrs. White's Golden Rule Cafe	Phoenix, Arizona
2	EV0502	Fried Chicken	Fried Chicken	Melissa D'Arabian	Babe's Chicken Dinner House	Roanoke, Texas
2	EV0502	Fried Chicken	Fried Chicken	Robert Irvine	Ms. Tootsies Soul Food Cafe	Philadelphia, PA
2	EV0502	Fried Chicken	Mama Els' Fried Chicken	Scott Conant	Hill Country Chicken	New York, NY
2	EV0502	Fried Chicken	Fried Chicken	Roger Mooking	The Wilkes House	Savannah, Georgia
2	EV0502	Fried Chicken	Coconut Fried Chicken	Michael Simon	Cha Cha Chicken	Santa Monica, California
3	EV0503	Smoky	Baby Back Ribs		17th Street Bar & Grill	Marion, Illinois
3	EV0503	Smoky	Sakura Smoked Hamachi Sashimi		Oishi Boston	Boston, MA
3	EV0503	Smoky	Big Pork Chop		Reef	Houston, TX
3	EV0503	Smoky	Smoked Mutz (Mozzarella) Hero		Vito's Italian Deli	Hoboken, NJ
3	EV0503	Smoky	Smoked Bar-B-Q Turkey		Big Bob Gibson Bar-B-Q	Decatur, AL
3	EV0503	Smoky	Tea Smoked Oysters		Desnuda	New York, NY
3	EV0503	Smoky	Smoky Bacon Cornbread		Husk Restaurant	Charleston, SC
3	EV0503	Smoky	Smoked Mullet Fish Dinner		Ted Peters Famous Smoked Fish, Inc.	South Pasadena, FL
4	EV0504	Better Than Mine	Pollo Al Forno (Roasted Chicken)		Barbuto	New York, NY
4	EV0504	Better Than Mine	Red Velvet Waffle		The Waffle	Los Angeles
4	EV0504	Better Than Mine	Steak Dunigan		The Pink Adobe	Santa Fe, New Mexico
4	EV0504	Better Than Mine	Sliced Fish Szechuan Style		Gourmet Dumpling House	Boston, Massachusetts
4	EV0504	Better Than Mine	Samosas		Samosa House	Los Angeles
4	EV0504	Better Than Mine	Fromage Blanc Island "Cheesecake"		Chikalicious Dessert Bar	New York, NY
4	EV0504	Better Than Mine	Arozz A Banda Con Gambas Paella		Jaleo	Washington, DC
4	EV0504	Better Than Mine	Tres Leche Cake		Kuba Kuba	Richmond, VA
5	EV0505	Las Vegas	Tiger Shrimp Roasted Garlic Corn Tamales		Mesa Grill (Caesars Palace)	Las Vegas, NV
5	EV0505	Las Vegas	Catfish Sloppy Joe (lunchtime only)		RM Seafood (Mandalay Bay)	Las Vegas, NV
5	EV0505	Las Vegas	Chile Rubbed Double Rib Eye		SW Steakhouse (Wynn)	Las Vegas, NV
5	EV0505	Las Vegas	Chicken Scarpariello		Rao's (Caesars Palace)	Las Vegas, NV
5	EV0505	Las Vegas	Twenty-Vegetable Fried Rice		The Cosmopolitan	Las Vegas, NV
5	EV0505	Las Vegas	Nam Prik Ong		Lotus Of Siam	Las Vegas, NV
5	EV0505	Las Vegas	Satay Of Chilean Sea Bass		Tao Asian Bistro (The Venetian)	Las Vegas, NV
5	EV0505	Las Vegas	La Langoustine		L'Atelier de Joel Robouchon	Las Vegas, Nevada
6	EV0506	Road Trip	Tater Tots		Grill 'Em All Truck	Los Angeles
6	EV0506	Road Trip	Gyro		Steve's Gyros	Cleveland, Ohio
6	EV0506	Road Trip	Lobster Mashed Potatoes		Prime 44 West At The Greenbrier	White Sulphur Springs, WV
6	EV0506	Road Trip	Ahi Wrap		Kilauea Fish Market	Kauaʻi, HI
6	EV0506	Road Trip	Pizza Pot Pie		Chicago Pizza & Oven Grinder Co.	Chicago, IL
6	EV0506	Road Trip	Barbequed Chicken		Churrascaria Novo Mundo	New Bedford, MA
6	EV0506	Road Trip	Salvadoran Burrito		Bueno Y Sano	Amherst, MA
6	EV0506	Road Trip	Roasted Van Vooren Ranch Pheasant		Fearing's Restaurant	Dallas, TX
7	EV0507	Old School	Oysters Rockefeller		Grand Central Oyster Bar & Restaurant	New York, NY
7	EV0507	Old School	Jean Leon Original Chopped Salad		La Scala	Beverly Hills, California
7	EV0507	Old School	Mo-Fo Burger		Ray's Place	Kent, Ohio
7	EV0507	Old School	Sand Dab Filets (fish)		Tadich Grill	San Francisco, California
7	EV0507	Old School	Souffle Potatoes (Pommes Souffle)		Galatoire's	New Orleans, Louisiana
7	EV0507	Old School	West Indies Pepperpot Soup		City Tavern	Philadelphia, PA
7	EV0507	Old School	Queso Flameado		The Original Ninfa's on Navigation	Houston, TX
7	EV0507	Old School	22 Ounce Strip Sirloin		Bern's Steak House	Tampa, FL
7	EV0507	Old School	Chocolate Peanut Butter Truffle		Bern's Steak House	Tampa, Florida
8	EV0508	Ice Creamy	Toffee Banofi Sundae		Sweet Republic Ice Cream	Scottsdale, Arizona
8	EV0508	Ice Creamy	Torta Gelato with Chocolate and Pistachio		Bulgarini Gelato	Altadena, California
8	EV0508	Ice Creamy	Gibson Girl		Farrell's Ice Cream Parlour and Restaurant (Closed)	Mission Viejo, California
8	EV0508	Ice Creamy	Hot Fudge Sundae		Ice Cream Smuggler	Dennis, MA
8	EV0508	Ice Creamy	Pecan Ball		Cafe Pacific	Dallas, TX
8	EV0508	Ice Creamy	Chocolate & Peanut Butter Smores w/ Vanilla Ice Cream		Prime One Twelve	Miami, FL
8	EV0508	Ice Creamy	Bourbon Apples Cranberry Miso Marcona Almond Maple Fat Gelato		Girl & The Goat	Chicago, IL
8	EV0508	Ice Creamy	Ice Cream Sandwich		Jacques Torres Chocolate	Brooklyn, NY
9	EV0509	French Favorites	Raclette Savoyarde		Le Pichet	Seattle, WA
9	EV0509	French Favorites	Foie Gras Terrine with Marinated Figs		Everest	Chicago
9	EV0509	French Favorites	Steak Frites		Solbar	Calistoga, California
9	EV0509	French Favorites	Gratin de Macaroni		Vin Rouge	Durham, North Carolina
9	EV0509	French Favorites	Braised Beef Shortribs		Lucques	Los Angeles
9	EV0509	French Favorites	Azuki Cream Croissant		Japonaise	Boston, Massachusetts
9	EV0509	French Favorites	Crawfish Etouffee		Robin's Restaurant	Henderson, Louisiana
9	EV0509	French Favorites	Mille Crepes Cake		Lady M Confections	New York, NY
10	EV0510	Eggstraordinary	Ultimate Steak & Egg Sliders		Society Cafe at Encore	Las Vegas, NV
10	EV0510	Eggstraordinary	Lobster "Begula" Pasta		Michel Richard Citronelle (Closed)	Washington, DC
10	EV0510	Eggstraordinary	Reuben Eggroll		Mcguire's Irish Pub	Pensacola, FL
10	EV0510	Eggstraordinary	Truffled Egg Toast		Cafe Ino (Closed)	New York, NY
10	EV0510	Eggstraordinary	Foot-hi Lemon Meringue Pie		Blue Springs Cafe	Highland, IL
10	EV0510	Eggstraordinary	"Bacon and Eggs"		Picholine	New York, NY
10	EV0510	Eggstraordinary	Huevos Barbacoa Con Chile D'arbol Salsa		Cafe Pasqual's	Santa Fe, New Mexico
10	EV0510	Eggstraordinary	Strawberry Souffle		Cafe Jacqueline	San Francisco, California
11	EV0511	Finger Food	Fried Pickle Chips		Blue Ridge Grill	Atlanta, Georgia
11	EV0511	Finger Food	Ike's Vietnamese Fish Sauce Wings		Pok Pok	Portland, OR
11	EV0511	Finger Food	Barbecue Potato Chips with Blue Cheese & Bacon Dip		Blue Smoke	New York, NY
11	EV0511	Finger Food	Afternoon Tea		The Adolphus	Dallas, Texas
11	EV0511	Finger Food	Dorowot		Meals by Genet	Los Angeles
11	EV0511	Finger Food	Toasted Ravioli (order online)		Mama Toscano's Ravioli	St. Louis, Missouri
11	EV0511	Finger Food	Gateway of India Pizza		Bombay Pizza Co.	Houston, Texas
11	EV0511	Finger Food	Bacon Wrapped Matzoh Balls		The Gorbals	Los Angeles
12	EV0512	Street Food	Escargot Puff Lollipop		Spencer On The Go	San Francisco, California
12	EV0512	Street Food	Elk Jalapeño Cheddar Brat		Biker Jim's Gourmet Dogs	Denver, CO
12	EV0512	Street Food	Malasadas with Haupia Filling		Leonard's Malasadamobile	Honolulu, HI
12	EV0512	Street Food	Wafel of Massive Deliciousness		Wafels & Dinges	New York, NY
12	EV0512	Street Food	Tortas Ahogadas		El Gallito	Chula Vista, California
12	EV0512	Street Food	H-100's (Tater Tots)		Grill 'Em All	Los Angeles
12	EV0512	Street Food	Pork Belly Slider		Odd Duck Farm To Trailer	Austin, TX
12	EV0512	Street Food	The Salty Pimp		Big Gay Ice Cream Truck	New York, NY
13	EV0513	Childhood Favorites	Cheese Pizza		Mimi's Pizza & Restaurant	New York, NY
13	EV0513	Childhood Favorites	Fried Bologna Sandwich		Andre's Lounge	Toledo, Ohio
13	EV0513	Childhood Favorites	Pineapple Upside Down Cupcake		Citizen Cake	San Francisco, California
13	EV0513	Childhood Favorites	Cavatelli		Bucci's Restaurant	Berea, Ohio
13	EV0513	Childhood Favorites	Soup and Kalua Pig Sandwich		Alan Wong's	Honolulu, HI
13	EV0513	Childhood Favorites	Frito Pie		Five & Dime	Santa Fe, New Mexico
13	EV0513	Childhood Favorites	Mussel Bisque		Dobson's Bar & Restaurant	San Diego, California
13	EV0513	Childhood Favorites	Cotton Candy		The Four Seasons	New York, NY

== Season 6 ==
Episode	Show Number	Topic	Item	Restaurant	Location
1	EV0601	All American	Bar-B-Q Chicken,	Bar-B-Q King Drive-In Restaurant	Charlotte, NC
1	EV0601	All American	Hot Dog (w/ chunky peanut butter, sriracha hot sauce and "alien pickle relish")	Happy Dog	Cleveland, OH
1	EV0601	All American	Cheesecake (New York-style)	Junior's Restaurant	Brooklyn, NY
1	EV0601	All American	Salted Caramel Apple Pie	Four & Twenty Blackbirds	Brooklyn, NY
1	EV0601	All American	Beef Wellington	Chez Francois	Vermilion, OH
1	EV0601	All American	Carrot Cake	Lloyd's Carrot Cake	Bronx, NY
1	EV0601	All American	Deep Fried Cheese Curds (beer-battered)	The Old Fashioned Tavern	Madison, WI
1	EV0601	All American	Paradise Hot Brown	Lynn's Paradise Cafe	Louisville, KY
2	EV0602	New Orleans	Beignets & Chicory Coffee	Cafe Beignet	New Orleans, LA
2	EV0602	New Orleans	Gumbo Z'herbes	Dooky Chase's Restaurant	New Orleans, LA
2	EV0602	New Orleans	Fried Catfish Dinner	Deanie's Seafood Restaurant & Market	New Orleans, LA
2	EV0602	New Orleans	Muffaletta	Johnny's Po-boys	New Orleans, LA
2	EV0602	New Orleans	Creole Bread Pudding Souffle (w/ whiskey cream sauce)	Commander's Palace Restaurant	New Orleans, LA
2	EV0602	New Orleans	Pho Ga	Pho Tau Bay Vietnamese Cuisine	New Orleans, LA
2	EV0602	New Orleans	Roman Candy	Roman Candy Company (horse-drawn cart)	New Orleans, LA
2	EV0602	New Orleans	Emeril's Banana Cream Pie	Emeril's Restaurant	New Orleans, LA
3	EV0603	Messy	Jake's Sloppy Slaw Burger	The Red Eyed Mule	Marietta, Georgia
3	EV0603	Messy	Shrimp Boil	The Boiling Crab	Alhambra, California
3	EV0603	Messy	Meatloaf Sandwich	Rye Restaurant	Brooklyn, New York
3	EV0603	Messy	Crispy Pata (fried pork leg)	Ruby's Fast Food	Chicago, IL
3	EV0603	Messy	The Godfather (lasagna grilled cheese sandwich)	Melt Bar & Grilled	Lakewood, OH
3	EV0603	Messy	Asparagus Pistachio Olive Chutney Radicchio Rice Bowl	Revel Restaurant	Seattle, WA
3	EV0603	Messy	Bread & Chocolate	Berkshire Mountain Bakery	Housatonic, Massachusetts
3	EV0603	Messy	Backstabber Sandwich (chicken Caesar salad and artichoke hearts with dirty secret sauce)	Ike's Place	San Francisco, California
4	EV0604	As Good as Mom's	Coq au vin (braised chicken in burgundy wine)	La Poubelle Restaurant	Los Angeles
4	EV0604	As Good as Mom's	Coconut Macaroons	Salty Tart Bakery (Midtown Global Market)	Minneapolis, MN
4	EV0604	As Good as Mom's	Chile Mecco Relleno	Suenos (Closed)	New York, NY
4	EV0604	As Good as Mom's	Blueberry Blintzes	B & H Dairy	New York, NY
4	EV0604	As Good as Mom's	Soondubu Jjigae (soft tofu stew)	Cho Dang Gol Restaurant	New York, NY
4	EV0604	As Good as Mom's	Cavatelli Broccoli Rabe & Sausage	Roc Restaurant (Relocated to Louisville, KY)	New York, NY
4	EV0604	As Good as Mom's	Spicy Chicken Pops (Indonesian/Malaysian chicken wings)	Lukshon	Culver City, California
4	EV0604	As Good as Mom's	Kaiserschmarrn (Austrian pancake)	Spago	Beverly Hills, California
5	EV0605	Frightfully Good	Buffalo-style Pig Tails	Animal	Los Angeles
5	EV0605	Frightfully Good	Jumbo Pig Brain Sandwich	Hilltop Inn	Evansville, Indiana
5	EV0605	Frightfully Good	Spicy & Tingly Lamb Face Salad	Xi'an Famous Foods	New York, NY
5	EV0605	Frightfully Good	Rabbit Liver & Kidneys on Toast	Feast	Houston, TX
5	EV0605	Frightfully Good	Vastedda (spleen sandwich)	Ferdinando's Focacceria	Carroll Gardens, Brooklyn, NY
5	EV0605	Frightfully Good	St. George Vert Absinthe	Sage at Aria	Las Vegas, NV
5	EV0605	Frightfully Good	Venison Tartare	Hotel Griffou	New York, NY
5	EV0605	Frightfully Good	Duck Tongue Tacos	Extra Virgin	Kansas City, MO
6	EV0606	Bird Is The Word	Turducken	Alpine Steak House and Karl Ehmers Quality Meats	Sarasota, FL
6	EV0606	Bird Is The Word	Peking Duck	Buddakan	New York, NY
6	EV0606	Bird Is The Word	Crackling Beer Can Chicken	A-Frame	Los Angeles
6	EV0606	Bird Is The Word	Tandoori Cornish Game Hen	Snackbar	Oxford, Mississippi
6	EV0606	Bird Is The Word	Duck Rice	Aldea	New York, NY
6	EV0606	Bird Is The Word	Chicken a la Plancha	Dovetail	New York, NY
6	EV0606	Bird Is The Word	Flattened Lemon Chicken	Oleana	Cambridge, Massachusetts
7	EV0607	Season's Eatings	Rose Petal Petit Fours	Valerie Confections	Los Angeles
7	EV0607	Season's Eatings	Coconut Gold Bars	Fran's Chocolates	Seattle, Washington
7	EV0607	Season's Eatings	Egg Nog	Ronnybrook Farms	Ancramdale, NY
7	EV0607	Season's Eatings	Rum Cake	Anthony's Pizza & Grille	Altoona, PA
7	EV0607	Season's Eatings	Chocolate Caramel Sea Salt Tart	Lovin' Oven	Frenchtown, NJ
7	EV0607	Season's Eatings	Buche De Noel	Pierre's	Bridgehampton, NY
7	EV0607	Season's Eatings	Fruit Cake	Collin Street Bakery	Corsicana, TX
7	EV0607	Season's Eatings	Bacon of the Month Club	Zingerman's	Ann Arbor, MI

== Switch to The Cooking Channel and Season 7 ==
The original broadcast of The Best Thing I Ever Ate, Seasons 1–6, were on The Food Network from 2009 to 2011. In 2018, the show switched to The Cooking Channel. Season 7 did not have any new restaurants. Rather, episodes were compilations from the previous 6 seasons. Episodes were based on cities like Chicago, Los Angeles, and New York, with the previous restaurants from those cities featured in each episode.

Starting with Season 8, episodes would consist of new restaurants and food items, with a mix of old and new contributors.

== Season 8 ==
Episode	Show Number	Topic	Item	Chef/Host	Restaurant	Location
1	EV0801	Worth the Wait	Beef Wellington	Alton Brown	Marcel	Atlanta, GA
1	EV0801	Worth the Wait	Brisket	Ali Khan	La Barbecue	Austin, TX
1	EV0801	Worth the Wait	Pasta Sugo	Beau Macmillan	Tratto	Phoenix, AZ
1	EV0801	Worth the Wait	Au Cheval Burger	Geoffrey Zakarian	Au Cheval	Chicago, IL
1	EV0801	Worth the Wait	Cinnamon Biscuit	Jamika Pesson	Callie's Hot Little Biscuit	Charleston, SC
1	EV0801	Worth the Wait	Chicken and Rice	Roger Mooking	Nong's Khao Man Gai	Portland, OR
1	EV0801	Worth the Wait	Hot Chicken	Duff Goldman	Howlin' Rays	Los Angeles, CA
2	EV0802	Feats of Meat	Rib Eye Cap	Bobby Flay	Salt & Char	Saratoga Springs, NY
2	EV0802	Feats of Meat	Chicharron	Monti Carlo	Broken Spanish	Los Angeles, CA
2	EV0802	Feats of Meat	Oxtail	Carla Hall	Cooks and Captains	Brooklyn, NY
2	EV0802	Feats of Meat	Never the Same Waygu Meatballs	Justin Brunson	The Backroom at Moody's	Waltham, MA
2	EV0802	Feats of Meat	Turkey Ribs	Tregaye Fraser	Tom, Dick, and Hank	Atlanta, GA
2	EV0802	Feats of Meat	Lamb Shoulder	Molly Yeh	Zahav	Philadelphia, PA
2	EV0802	Feats of Meat	Sausage Tasting	Alexa Guarnaschelli	Euclid Hall	Denver, CO
3	EV0803	Life Changers	Sourdough, Sauerkraut, Pecorino & Ricotta Pancakes	Alton Brown	State Bird Provisions	San Francisco, CA
3	EV0803	Life Changers	Original Tomato Pie	Alex Guarnaschelli	Frank Pepe Pizzeria Napoletana	New Haven, CT
3	EV0803	Life Changers	Roasted Chicken	Jeff Mauro	Boka	Chicago, IL
3	EV0803	Life Changers	Corn Agnolotti	Simon Majumdar	The Annex Kitchen	Fresno, CA
3	EV0803	Life Changers	Catfish and Grits	Fanny Slater	PinPoint	Wilmington, NC
3	EV0803	Life Changers	Artichokes Barigoule	Jonathon Sawyer	Edwins Restaurant	Cleveland, OH
3	EV0803	Life Changers	Olowalu Lime Pie	Duff Goldman	Leoda's Kitchen and Pie Shop	Maui, HI
4	EV0804	Picture Perfect	Beets, Labanaeh, Honey & Roti	Carla Hall	Alliance	Traverse City, MI
4	EV0804	Picture Perfect	Roast Duck Flambe	Eddie Jackson	Beatrice Inn	New York, NY
4	EV0804	Picture Perfect	Sorrell Pesto Rice Bowl	Monti Carlo	Sqirl	Los Angeles, CA
4	EV0804	Picture Perfect	Fiori Di Zucca	Antonia Lofaso	Felix	Venice, CA
4	EV0804	Picture Perfect	The Rebel Within	Molly Yeh	Craftsman & Wolves	San Francisco, CA
4	EV0804	Picture Perfect	Cookies + Milk	Aaron Sanchez	Willa Jean	New Orleans, LA
4	EV0804	Picture Perfect	Rice Porridge	Alton Brown	Destroyer	Culver City, CA
5	EV0805	Throwback	Box Lunch	Alton Brown	Sally Bell's Kitchen	Richmond, VA
5	EV0805	Throwback	Steak Diane	Simon Majumdar	Cotton	Manchester, NH
5	EV0805	Throwback	Pigs In A Blanket	Alex Guarnaschelli	Little Donkey	Cambridge, MA
5	EV0805	Throwback	Shrimp De Jonghe	Jeff Mauro	Gene & Georgetti	Chicago, IL
5	EV0805	Throwback	The Loco Moco	Tregaye Fraser	Rainbow Drive-In	Honolulu, HI
5	EV0805	Throwback	Bananas Foster	Donal Skehan	Brennan's	New Orleans, LA
6	EV0806	Voted Most Popular	Fried Chicken	Bobby Flay	Bubby's	New York, NY
6	EV0806	Voted Most Popular	Stetson Chopped Salad	Beau Macmillan	Cowboy Ciao	Phoenix, AZ
6	EV0806	Voted Most Popular	Corn Pizza	Katie Lee	Al forno	Providence, RI
6	EV0806	Voted Most Popular	Bo Loc Lac (Shaking Beef)	Nguyen Tran	Newport Seafood	San Gabriel, CA
6	EV0806	Voted Most Popular	Egg Baked in Celery Cream	Simon Majumdar	Miller Union	Atlanta, GA
6	EV0806	Voted Most Popular	Bourbon Honey Ice Cream	Jason Smith	Crank & Boom	Lexington, KY
6	EV0806	Voted Most Popular	Lobster Spaghetti	Aaron Sanchez	Nico Osteria	Chicago, IL
7	EV0807	Southern Charm	Shrimp & Grits (aka Bill Neal)	Alton Brown	Biscuit Love	Nashville, TN
7	EV0807	Southern Charm	Fried Chicken	Justin Brunson	Willie May's Scotch House	New Orleans, LA
7	EV0807	Southern Charm	Low Country Boil	Beau MacMillan	The Regional Kitchen & Public House	West Palm Beach, FL
7	EV0807	Southern Charm	Grilled Ham & Pimiento Cheese Sandwich	Jason Smith	Wallace Station	Versailles, KY
7	EV0807	Southern Charm	Coconut Pecan Cake	James Briscione	Bottega Café	Birmingham, AL
7	EV0807	Southern Charm	Whole Hog Sandwich	Roger Mooking	Rodney Scott's Whole Hog BBQ	Charleston, SC
7	EV0807	Southern Charm	Peach Cobbler	Marcus Samuelsson	Dooky Chase's Restaurant	New Orleans, LA
8	EV0808	Extra Crispy	Fried Pot Pie	Alex Guarnaschelli	Turkey and the Wolf	New Orleans, LA
8	EV0808	Extra Crispy	Crab Caramel Chicken Wings	Nguyen Tran	Hot Joy	San Antonio, TX
8	EV0808	Extra Crispy	Panko Crusted Ahi Sashimi	Fanny Slater	Sansei	Waikiki, HI
8	EV0808	Extra Crispy	Potato Latkes	Antonia Lofaso	Russ & Daughters	New York, NY
8	EV0808	Extra Crispy	Pizza Tempura	Justin Warner	Sake Bar Hagi 46	New York, NY
8	EV0808	Extra Crispy	Escovitch Snapper	Jamika Pessoa	Sattdown Jamaican	Studio City, CA
8	EV0808	Extra Crispy	Baklava	Geoffrey Zakarian	Estiatorio Milos	New York, NY
9	EV0809	Big Cheese	Queso Fundito	Bobby Flay	Border Grill	Los Angeles, CA
9	EV0809	Big Cheese	Calzone (CP Classic)	Jonathon Sawyer	Citizen Pie	Cleveland, OH
9	EV0809	Big Cheese	Macaroni and Cheese	Jamika Pessoa	Soul Vegetarian	Atlanta, GA
9	EV0809	Big Cheese	Enchiladas with Green Chile	Justin Warner	Maria's New Mexican Kitchen	Santa Fe, NM
9	EV0809	Big Cheese	Cheese Curd Stuffed Bratwurst	Jeff Mauro	Spoon and Stable	Minneapolis, MN
9	EV0809	Big Cheese	Dip & Chips	Nguyen Tran	Horseshoe Hill Café	Fort Worth, TX
9	EV0809	Big Cheese	Cacio e Pepe Fritelle	Geoffrey Zakarian	Lilia	Brooklyn, NY
10	EV0810	Sandwich Hall of Fame	Cheesesteak	Alton Brown	Fred's Meat & Bread	Atlanta, GA
10	EV0810	Sandwich Hall of Fame	The Friday Special	Fanny Slater	Millburn Deli	Millburn, NJ
10	EV0810	Sandwich Hall of Fame	The Peacemaker (Oyster & Shrimp Po-Boy)	Aarón Sánchez	Mahony's Po-Boy Shop	New Orleans, LA
10	EV0810	Sandwich Hall of Fame	Corned Beef Tongue Reuben	Ali Khan	Bavette La Boucherie	Milwaukee, WI
10	EV0810	Sandwich Hall of Fame	Pisillo (Italian Sandwich)	Katie Lee	Pisillo Italian Panini	New York, NY
10	EV0810	Sandwich Hall of Fame	BL"G"T	Eddie Jackson	Pike Road Butcher Block	Pike Road, AL
10	EV0810	Sandwich Hall of Fame	The Schmitter	Duff Goldman	McNally's Tavern	Philadelphia, PA
11	EV0811	Serious Spice	Fiesta Molé	Jeff Mauro	New Rebozo	Oak Park, IL
11	EV0811	Serious Spice	Tikka French Toast	Ali Khan	Rasika (West End)	Washington, DC
11	EV0811	Serious Spice	Chiles Toreados Tacos	Donal Skehan	Guisados	Los Angeles, CA
11	EV0811	Serious Spice	Walleye	Alex Guarnaschelli	Shuang Cheng	Minneapolis, MN
11	EV0811	Serious Spice	Chongqing Chicken Wings	Justin Brunson	Mission Chinese	San Francisco, CA
11	EV0811	Serious Spice	Barbecue Smoked Tofu	Aarón Sánchez	Redbird	Los Angeles, CA
11	EV0811	Serious Spice	Boti (Lamb) Kebab	Duff Goldman	Bhatti Indian Grill	New York, NY
12	EV0812	Hamburger Heaven	Dry Aged Beef Burger	Duff Goldman	Ink. Well	Los Angeles, CA
12	EV0812	Hamburger Heaven	Fondue Burger	Tregaye Fraser	Clinton Hall	New York, NY
12	EV0812	Hamburger Heaven	Triple Cheeseburger with Bacon	Ali Khan	Carl's Drive-In	Brentwood, MO
12	EV0812	Hamburger Heaven	Shouk Burger	Carla Hall	Shouk	Washington, DC
12	EV0812	Hamburger Heaven	Rustico Burger	Jason Smith	Green Truck Pub	Savannah, GA
12	EV0812	Hamburger Heaven	Alfie's Bun	Eddie Jackson	Lucky Buns	Washington, DC
12	EV0812	Hamburger Heaven	PQM Burger	Marcus Samuelsson	Publican Quality Meats	Chicago, IL
13	EV0813	Small Plates, Big Taste	Blue Crab Beignets	Alex Guarnaschelli	La Petite Grocery	New Orleans, LA
13	EV0813	Small Plates, Big Taste	Day Boat Scallops en Croûte	Beau MacMillan	Valette	Healdsburg, CA
13	EV0813	Small Plates, Big Taste	Radishes	Antonia Lofaso	NoMad	New York, NY
13	EV0813	Small Plates, Big Taste	Karaage Chicken	Roger Mooking	Kemur Tatsu-Ya	Austin, TX
13	EV0813	Small Plates, Big Taste	Fried Cheesy Pickles	Molly Yeh	The Toasted Frog	Grand Forks, ND
13	EV0813	Small Plates, Big Taste	Polpo (Charred Octopus)	Monti Carlo	Virtú Honest Craft	Scottsdale, AZ
13	EV0813	Small Plates, Big Taste	Pan Con Tomate	Aarón Sánchez	Toro	New York, NY

== Season 9 ==
This season was a mix of "compilation" episodes (with footage from seasons 1–6) and newly produced episodes. Compilation episodes are so marked and do not have a segment listing.

Episode	Show Number	Topic	Item	Chef/Host	Restaurant	Location
1	EV0901	Chocolicious	COMPILATION	N/A	N/A	N/A
2	EV0902	Southern Eats	COMPILATION	N/A	N/A	N/A
3	EV0903	Awesome Asian	COMPILATION	N/A	N/A	N/A
4	EV0904	Terrific Italian	Buccatini Ala Carbonara	Alton Brown	Barbuto	New York, NY
4	EV0904	Terrific Italian	Veal Meatballs and Polenta	Beau MacMillan	Fat Ox	Scottsdale, AZ
4	EV0904	Terrific Italian	Apollonia Pizza	Scott Conant	Una Pizza Napoletana	New York, NY
4	EV0904	Terrific Italian	Chicken Parmigiano Sandwich	Ali Khan	Bricco Salumeria & Pasta Shop	Boston, MA
4	EV0904	Terrific Italian	Stracciatella Gelato	Duff Goldman	Angelo Brocato Ice Cream	New Orleans, LA
4	EV0904	Terrific Italian	Rice Ball	Fabio Viviani	Scopa Italian Roots	Venice, CA
4	EV0904	Terrific Italian	Lasagna Al Forno	Alex Guarnaschelli	DiPalo's	New York, NY
5	EV0905	Rise and Dine	French Toast	Scott Conant	Bardot Brasserie, Aria Resort & Casino	Las Vegas, NV
5	EV0905	Rise and Dine	Stone Ground Grits, Country Ham & Biscuits	Martha Stewart	Loveless Café	Nashville, TN
5	EV0905	Rise and Dine	Hash Brown Chilaquiles	Monti Carlo	Trois Familia	Los Angeles, CA
5	EV0905	Rise and Dine	Classic Tuna Paninetti All'olio	Geoffrey Zakarian	Sant Ambroeus	New York, NY
5	EV0905	Rise and Dine	Mushroom Toast	Antonia Lofaso	Republique	Los Angeles, CA
5	EV0905	Rise and Dine	Goat Chorizo Breakfast Sandwich	Ali Khan	Sour Duck Market	Austin, TX
5	EV0905	Rise and Dine	Blueberry Lemon Ricotta Pancakes	Jeff Mauro	Delia's Kitchen	Oak Park, IL
6	EV0906	Mexican Favorites	Suadero Tacos	Ali Khan	Suerte	Austin, TX
6	EV0906	Mexican Favorites	Tamales Verde de Pollo	Jeff Mauro	La Parrillita Mexican Grill	River Forest, IL
6	EV0906	Mexican Favorites	Envuelto	Beau MacMillan	Gallo Blanco	Phoenix, AZ
6	EV0906	Mexican Favorites	Black Cod "Al Pastor"	Alex Guarnaschelli	Leña Brava	Chicago, IL
6	EV0906	Mexican Favorites	Cadillac Nachos	Pati Jinich	Cantina Leña	Seattle, WA
6	EV0906	Mexican Favorites	Lamb BBQ Plate	Simon Majumdar	Aqui Es Texcoco	Commerce, CA
6	EV0906	Mexican Favorites	Tomatillo Avocado Salsa	Alton Brown	Cosecha Cocina	Columbus, OH
7	EV0907	Brilliantly Baked	Lemon Bar	Alex Guarnaschelli	Diane's Bakery	Roslyn, NY
7	EV0907	Brilliantly Baked	Chocolate Babka	Molly Yeh	Breads Bakery	New York, NY
7	EV0907	Brilliantly Baked	Peanut Butter el Rollo	Jernard Wells	Cake Monkey	Los Angeles, CA
7	EV0907	Brilliantly Baked	Peanut Butter & Jelly Cupcake	Tregaye Fraser	CamiCakes Cupcakes	Atlanta, GA
7	EV0907	Brilliantly Baked	Cranberry Coconut Pop-Tart	Jonathon Sawyer	Milktooth	Indianapolis, IN
7	EV0907	Brilliantly Baked	Banana Split Cookie	Brandi Milloy	Milk Jar Cookies	Los Angeles, CA
7	EV0907	Brilliantly Baked	Brioche in the Viennoiserie Basket	Martha Stewart	Benoit	New York, NY
8	EV0908	Sweet Stuff	COMPILATION	N/A	N/A	N/A
9	EV0909	High Steaks	Porterhouse	Antonia Lofaso	Cut by Wolfgang Puck	Los Angeles, CA
9	EV0909	High Steaks	Butcher's Feast	Elena Besser	Cote	New York, NY
9	EV0909	High Steaks	Pin Bone Steak	Justin Brunson	Cockscomb	San Francisco, CA
9	EV0909	High Steaks	Char Siu Pork Chop	Stuart O'Keeffe	Jar	West Hollywood, CA
9	EV0909	High Steaks	Ribeye	Jonathon Sawyer	Pine Club	Dayton, OH
9	EV0909	High Steaks	Surf N Turf (Baseball Steak & New Orleans BBQ Shrimp)	Jernard Wells	C. Ellet's Steak House	Atlanta, GA
9	EV0909	High Steaks	Butter Steak	Duff Goldman	Chez Jay	Santa Monica, CA
10	EV0910	Decadent Donuts	Glazed Donuts	Alton Brown	Gibson's Donuts	Memphis, TN
10	EV0910	Decadent Donuts	Coconut Cream Doughnut	Scott Conant	Doughnut Plant	New York, NY
10	EV0910	Decadent Donuts	Monte Cristo	Jernard Wells	District Donuts. Sliders. Brew.	New Orleans, LA
10	EV0910	Decadent Donuts	Campfire Churros	Ali Khan	Churro Co.	Austin, TX
10	EV0910	Decadent Donuts	The Belly Bomb Donut	Jamika Pessoa	Glam Doll Donuts	Minneapolis, MN
10	EV0910	Decadent Donuts	Birthday Doughnut	Brandi Milloy	Sidecar Donuts	Costa Mesa, CA
10	EV0910	Decadent Donuts	Apple Crumb Donut	Alex Guarnaschelli	Peter Pan Donut & Pastry	New York, NY
11	EV0911	The Upper Crust	Pork Chile Verde Pot Pie	Beau MacMillan	Phoenix Public Market Café	Phoenix, AZ
11	EV0911	The Upper Crust	Seafood Pot Pie	Duff Goldman	Elsie's Plate & Pie	Baton Rouge, LA
11	EV0911	The Upper Crust	Mustang Chicken	Pati Jinich	Cappy's	San Antonio, TX
11	EV0911	The Upper Crust	Dad's Burger	Stuart O'Keeffe	Dad's Kitchen	Sacramento, CA
11	EV0911	The Upper Crust	Gnocchi Bread Bowl	Courtney Rada	DiAnoia's Eatery	Pittsburgh, PA
11	EV0911	The Upper Crust	Pecan Crusted Pork Tenderloin	Jason Smith	Merrick Inn	Lexington, KY
11	EV0911	The Upper Crust	Peach Cobbler	Tregaye Fraser	Mary Mac's Tea Room	Atlanta, GA
12	EV0912	Let's Do Lunch	Milos Special	Martha Stewart	Estiatorio Milos	New York, NY
12	EV0912	Let's Do Lunch	Lobster Mac 'N' Cheese	Tregaye Fraser	Kitchen Cray	Lanham, MD
12	EV0912	Let's Do Lunch	Pistachio Bacon Chicken Salad Sandwich	Ali Khan	Walton's Fancy & Staple	Austin, TX
12	EV0912	Let's Do Lunch	Texas Chili	Simon Majumdar	24th Street Café	Bakersfield, CA
12	EV0912	Let's Do Lunch	Lamb Belly Bahn Mi	Josh Capon	Hometown Bar-B-Que	Brooklyn, NY
12	EV0912	Let's Do Lunch	Crab Louis Salad	Lee Anne Wong	Swan Oyster Depot	San Francisco, CA
12	EV0912	Let's Do Lunch	Ribs	Jernard Wells	Fat Matt's Rib Shack	Atlanta, GA
13	EV0913	Back to School	The Super Boffa Combo	Beau MacMillan	Edgewood Market	Cranston, RI
13	EV0913	Back to School	Pepperoni Panzerotti	Jeff Mauro	Bertollis River Plaza	River Forest, IL
13	EV0913	Back to School	Loaded Grilled Cheese	Courtney Rada	Harlem Public	Harlem, NY
13	EV0913	Back to School	Jaguar Special	Jamika Pessoa	Colonel Mustard's Phat Burgers	Jacksonville, FL
13	EV0913	Back to School	Red Potato Pizza	Hannah Chloe	Willington Pizza House	Willington, CT
13	EV0913	Back to School	Ricotta Cannoli	Tregaye Fraser	Varallo Brothers	Philadelphia, PA
13	EV0913	Back to School	Beef Burrito	Duff Goldman	Villa Coronoa	St. Helena, CA
14	EV0914	The Closers	Lemon Meringue (Tart)	Martha Stewart	Cipriani	New York, NY
14	EV0914	The Closers	Cheesecake Beignets	Tregaye Fraser	Tuscarora Mill	Leesburg, VA
14	EV0914	The Closers	Napoleon	Antonia Lofaso	Petit Trois	Los Angeles, CA
14	EV0914	The Closers	Banana Pudding with Salted Caramel Popcorn	Jason Smith	Buttermilk Channel	Brooklyn, NY
14	EV0914	The Closers	Pecan Pie	Pati Jinich	Arnold's Country Kitchen	Nashville, TN
14	EV0914	The Closers	The Avocado Dessert	Simon Majumdar	Seviche Restaurant	Louisville, KY
14	EV0914	The Closers	Olive Oil Mint Cake	Molly Yeh	The Exchange Restaurant	Los Angeles, CA
15	EV0915	Layers of Goodness	The Grasshopper Charlotte	Geoffrey Zakarian	The Grill	New York, NY
15	EV0915	Layers of Goodness	Börek	Molly Yeh	Sofra Bakery & Café	Cambridge, MA
15	EV0915	Layers of Goodness	Sweet Cream Biscuits	Justin Brunson	The Country Cat Dinner House & Bar	Portland, OR
15	EV0915	Layers of Goodness	Pastelon (Plantain Lasagna)	Monti Carlo	La Isla	Seattle, WA
15	EV0915	Layers of Goodness	Thousand Layer Pancake	Simon Majumdar	Joy	Highland Park, CA
15	EV0915	Layers of Goodness	Moussaka	Stephanie Boswell	Inotheke	Santa Monica, CA
15	EV0915	Layers of Goodness	Goddess Rainbow Cake	Jeff Mauro	The Goddess & Grocer	Chicago, IL
16	EV0916	I'll Have What They're Having	The Famous Meatball & Salad	Geoffrey Zakarian	Café Martorano	Ft. Lauderdale, FL
16	EV0916	I'll Have What They're Having	Pork Belly Pastrami	Monti Carlo	Citizen Public House	Scottsdale, AZ
16	EV0916	I'll Have What They're Having	Lobster Fried Rice	Tregaye Fraser	Poor Calvin's	Atlanta, GA
16	EV0916	I'll Have What They're Having	Sourdough Cinnamon Roll	Antonia Lofaso	Lodge Bread Co.	Culver City, CA
16	EV0916	I'll Have What They're Having	Arroz Gordo "The Fat Rice"	Elena Besser	Fat Rice	Chicago, IL
16	EV0916	I'll Have What They're Having	Green Chili Breakfast Burrito	Adam Gertler	King's Chef Diner	Colorado Springs, CO
16	EV0916	I'll Have What They're Having	Vanilla Stout Cake Shake	Claudia Sandoval	Public House	Chicago, IL
17	EV0917	One of a Kind	The Rugby Crepe	Fabio Viviani	Simply Crêpes	Canandaigua, NY
17	EV0917	One of a Kind	Mac'N'Cheese Chicken Cone	Tregaye Fraser	Chick'nCone	New York, NY
17	EV0917	One of a Kind	Lime Pie Burnt Meringue	Elena Besser	Llama Inn	Brooklyn, NY
17	EV0917	One of a Kind	Veal Schnitzel Tacos	Pati Jinich	Abe Fischer	Philadelphia, PA
17	EV0917	One of a Kind	Caviel e Mozzarella	Jonathon Sawyer	Cal Mare	Los Angeles, CA
17	EV0917	One of a Kind	Jacked-Up Morganza Cake	Cody and Samantha Carroll	Baking on the Bayou Cakery	Ventress, LA
17	EV0917	One of a Kind	Crab Rangoon Pizza	Alton Brown	Fong's Pizza & Tiki Bar	Des Moines, IA

== Season 10 ==
Episode 4 was the only "compilation" episode this season (see Season 9 above), and as such has no segment listing.

Episode	Show Number	Topic	Item	Chef/Host	Restaurant	Location
1	EV1001	Trigger Foods	Roast Chicken (Catskill Guinea Fowl)	Geoffrey Zakarian	Le Coq Rico	New York, NY
1	EV1001	Trigger Foods	Salmon Patties with Fried; Green Tomatoes (aka Lynne Stack)	Tregaye Fraser	Home Grown, GA	Atlanta, GA
1	EV1001	Trigger Foods	Prime Rib	Simon Majumdar	Taylor's Steak House	Los Angeles, CA
1	EV1001	Trigger Foods	Fried Chicken Po'Boy	Jamika Pessoa	Braise & Crumble Café	Pasadena, CA
1	EV1001	Trigger Foods	Banter Poutine	Jonathon Sawyer	Banter Beer & Wine	Cleveland, OH
1	EV1001	Trigger Foods	Steak Tartare	Hannah Chloe Kaplan	Mayfield	Brooklyn, NY
1	EV1001	Trigger Foods	Chincoteague Single-Fry Oysters	Duff Goldman	Gertrude's Chesapeake Kitchen	Baltimore, MD
2	EV1002	On a Date	Potato Gnocchi	Alex Guarnaschelli	Hearth	New York, NY
2	EV1002	On a Date	Tomahawk Pork Chop	Jernard Wells	HY's Steak House	Waikiki, HI
2	EV1002	On a Date	Spaghetti with Breadcrumbs	Tara Lipinski & Johnny Weir	L'Artusi	New York, NY
2	EV1002	On a Date	All You Can Eat Raclette	Justin Brunson	Truffle Table	Denver, CO
2	EV1002	On a Date	Honey Butter Chips	Elena Besser	Oiji (Closed)	New York, NY
2	EV1002	On a Date	Dover Sole	Cody Carroll & Samantha Carroll	Seagar's Prime Steaks & Seafood	Miramar Beach, FL
2	EV1002	On a Date	14 K Chocolate Cake	Jeff Mauro	RPM Steak	Chicago, IL
3	EV1003	Chocolate Bliss	Dark Truffle Cake	Ali Khan	Délice Chocolatier & Patisserie	San Antonio, TX
3	EV1003	Chocolate Bliss	The Brookie	Scott Conant	Honey Salt	Las Vegas, NV
3	EV1003	Chocolate Bliss	"Hit Me" Chocolate Cake	Tara Lipinski & Johnny Weir	Catch	New York, NY
3	EV1003	Chocolate Bliss	Gelato Cart (Chocolate Sauce)	Kristen Kish	Cotogna	San Francisco, CA
3	EV1003	Chocolate Bliss	S'mores	Justin Brunson	Woodhouse Chocolate	St. Helena, CA
3	EV1003	Chocolate Bliss	Zuppa al Cioccolato (Chocolate Soup)	Monti Carlo	Sotto Sotto	Atlanta, GA
3	EV1003	Chocolate Bliss	Deep Fried Chocolate	Tregaye Fraser	Native	Santa Monica, CA
4	EV1004	Game Changers	COMPILATION	N/A	N/A	N/A
5	EV1005	Best Meal Deal	Cioppino	Ali Khan	Eatery A	Des Moines, IA
5	EV1005	Best Meal Deal	Chopped Cheese	Jonathon Sawyer	Blue Sky Deli	Harlem, NY
5	EV1005	Best Meal Deal	Mama's Crunchy Gringo Tacos	Antonia Lofaso	Clutch	Venice, CA
5	EV1005	Best Meal Deal	Ham & Pimento Cheese	Jernard Wells	home.made	Athens, GA
5	EV1005	Best Meal Deal	Mochiko Chicken Bowl	Justin Brunson	Tin Roof	Kahului, HI
5	EV1005	Best Meal Deal	Hand Rolled Ricotta Cavatelli	Monti Carlo	FIG Restaurant at the Fairmont Miramar	Santa Monica, CA
5	EV1005	Best Meal Deal	Orca Platter	Duff Goldman	Old Ebbit Grill	Washington, DC
6	EV1006	Asian Sensations	Wagyu Beef Sukiyaki	Martha Stewart	Nobu 57	New York, NY
6	EV1006	Asian Sensations	Lion's Head Soup	Duff Goldman	LUVI Restaurant	New Orleans, LA
6	EV1006	Asian Sensations	General Tso's Whole Fried Chicken	Jonathon Sawyer	The Plum	Cleveland, OH
6	EV1006	Asian Sensations	Báhn Bao (Pork, Egg & Sausage Bun)	Alex Guarnaschelli	Quang Restaurant	Minneapolis, MN
6	EV1006	Asian Sensations	Mera Mera Dip with Soba Noodles	Kristen Kish	Cocoron	New York, NY
6	EV1006	Asian Sensations	Spicy Beef Bulgogi	Pati Jinich	Honey Pig	Rockville, MD
6	EV1006	Asian Sensations	Nam Khao Tod (Crispy Rice Salad)	Wolfgang Puck	NIGHT + MARKET	Los Angeles, CA
7	EV1007	Key Ingredient	Yukon Gold Cinnamon Roll	Alton Brown	Scarlett Begonia	Santa Barbara, CA
7	EV1007	Key Ingredient	Fried Oysters w/Bourbon Barrel Soy Aïoli	Monti Carlo	Maypop	New Orleans, LA
7	EV1007	Key Ingredient	Grilled Lamb Saddle Chop	Simon Majumdar	Bavel	Los Angeles, CA
7	EV1007	Key Ingredient	Tagliatelle Bolognese	Kristen Kish	The Butcher Shop	Boston, MA
7	EV1007	Key Ingredient	Patty Melt	Adam Gertler	Cassell's Hamburgers	Los Angeles, CA
7	EV1007	Key Ingredient	Strawberry Moonshine Pound Cake	Tregaye Fraser	Twisted Soul Cookhouse & Pours	Atlanta, GA
7	EV1007	Key Ingredient	Salty Soured Pickled Rye Bread	Alex Guarnaschelli	Carissa's The Bakery	East Hampton, NY
8	EV1008	Feast of the Middle East	Jeweled Crispy Rice	Alton Brown	Kismet	Los Angeles, CA
8	EV1008	Feast of the Middle East	Soltani Kabob	Sabin Lomac	Raffi's Place	Glendale, CA
8	EV1008	Feast of the Middle East	Lamb Shoulder	Scott Conant	Maydan	Washington, DC
8	EV1008	Feast of the Middle East	Chicken Tagine	Katie Pix	Kish-Kash	New York, NY
8	EV1008	Feast of the Middle East	Tahini Hummus and Pita	Alex Guarnaschelli	Saba	New Orleans, LA
8	EV1008	Feast of the Middle East	Egyptian Moussaka	Lee Anne Wong	Kabab Café	Astoria, NY
8	EV1008	Feast of the Middle East	Bastilla	Monti Carlo	Alzohour Market & Restaurant	Phoenix, AZ
9	EV1009	New Deli Done Right	Smoked Meat Poutine	Alex Guarnaschelli	Mile End Deli	New York, NY
9	EV1009	New Deli Done Right	The Dante Sandwich	Jeff Mauro	Tempesta Market	Chicago, IL
9	EV1009	New Deli Done Right	Smoked Fish bagel	Ali Khan	Golden Brown & Delicious	Greensville, SC
9	EV1009	New Deli Done Right	Black & White Everything Sammie	Elena Besser	Ice & Vice	New York, NY
9	EV1009	New Deli Done Right	Reuben Sandwich	Pati Jinich	The General Muir	Atlanta, GA
9	EV1009	New Deli Done Right	Matzo Mac'N'Cheese	Jonathon Sawyer	Larder Delicatessen & Bakery	Cleveland, OH
9	EV1009	New Deli Done Right	Hot Smoked Salmon	Wolfgang Puck	Wexler's Deli	Santa Monica, CA
10	EV1010	Special Occasion	Clay Baked Wild King Salmon	Martha Stewart	Restaurant DANIEL	New York, NY
10	EV1010	Special Occasion	Twin Filets Oscar Style	Jason Smith	Malone's	Lexington, KY
10	EV1010	Special Occasion	Ludicrous Chicken Wings	Tom Papa	The Chicken or the Egg	Beach Haven, NJ
10	EV1010	Special Occasion	Duck & Beef Burger	Tregaye Fraser	CANOE	Atlanta, GA
10	EV1010	Special Occasion	Lobster Toscano	Michael Psilakis	Il Toscano	Douglaston, NY
10	EV1010	Special Occasion	Peking Duck	Katie Pix	Ji Rong Peking Duck	Rosemead, CA
10	EV1010	Special Occasion	Oxtail Gnocchi	Beau MacMillan	Herb & Wood	San Diego, CA
11	EV1011	Genuine Legends	Scallops, Dashi Brown Butter Sauce	Wolfgang Puck	Le Bernardin	New York, NY
11	EV1011	Genuine Legends	Original Chili Half Smoke	Jernard Wells	Ben's Chili Bowl	Washington, DC
11	EV1011	Genuine Legends	Carolina Pork Sandwich	Claudia Sandoval	Joe's Kansas City Bar-B-Que	Kansas City, KS
11	EV1011	Genuine Legends	Buckwheat Pancakes	Simon Majumdar	Polly's Pancake Parlor	Sugar Hill, NH
11	EV1011	Genuine Legends	Tartufo	Josh Capon	Nick & Toni's	East Hampton, NY
11	EV1011	Genuine Legends	'21' Caesar Salad	Geoffrey Zakarian	21 Club	New York, NY
11	EV1011	Genuine Legends	Fresh Strawberry Donut	Sabin Lomac	Donut Man	Glendora, CA
12	EV1012	Yummy in the Middle	Vanilla Cream 100 Layer Doughnut	Jeff Mauro	Five Daughters Bakery	Nashville, TN
12	EV1012	Yummy in the Middle	Italian Chicken Sandwich	Sabin Lomac	Varsi Deli	Queens, NY
12	EV1012	Yummy in the Middle	Spicy Soppressata & Sausage Calzone	Josh Capon	Loring Place	New York, NY
12	EV1012	Yummy in the Middle	Raspberry Pie in Chocolate Crust	Jamika Pessoa	Pietisserie	Oakland, CA
12	EV1012	Yummy in the Middle	Pepper Jack Boudin Balls	Cody Carroll & Samantha Carroll	Billy's Mini Mart	Krotz Springs, LA
12	EV1012	Yummy in the Middle	Duck and Pork Hash Quesadilla	Lee Anne Wong	MW Restaurant	Honolulu, HI
12	EV1012	Yummy in the Middle	Ricotta and Egg Raviolo	Antonia Lofaso	Osteria Mozza	Los Angeles, CA
13	EV1013	Culinary Revolutions	Foccacia di Recco	Katie Pix	chi SPACCA	Los Angeles, CA
13	EV1013	Culinary Revolutions	Tots with Caviar	Scott Conant	Snack Boys	Milwaukee, WI
13	EV1013	Culinary Revolutions	Belly Benedict	Tregaye Fraser	Sun in My Belly	Atlanta, GA
13	EV1013	Culinary Revolutions	Royale Burger with Cheese	Michael Psilakis	Restaurant Gwendolyn	San Antonio, TX
13	EV1013	Culinary Revolutions	Oysters Rockefeller	Justin Brunson	Fruition	Denver, CO
13	EV1013	Culinary Revolutions	Corn Dog Rilette	Kristen Kish	Lady of the House	Detroit, MI
13	EV1013	Culinary Revolutions	Salt & Pepper Calamari	Jernard Wells	Le Fat	Atlanta, GA
14	EV1014	In the Last Place You'd Expect	Toffee Chocolate Chip Cookies	Antonia Lofaso	iPic Theaters	Los Angeles, CA
14	EV1014	In the Last Place You'd Expect	Jackalope Burger	Beau MacMillan	Wrangler Drive-In	Fairfield, ID
14	EV1014	In the Last Place You'd Expect	Falafel Plate	Jeff Mauro	Oasis Cafe	Chicago, IL
14	EV1014	In the Last Place You'd Expect	Lechon con Frijoles	Geoffrey Zakarian	Las Puertas	Buffalo, NY
14	EV1014	In the Last Place You'd Expect	Double Pork Chop Sandwich	Simon Majumdar	Pork Chop John's	Butte, MT
14	EV1014	In the Last Place You'd Expect	Smoked Potato with Coffee	Jonathon Sawyer	Superior Motors	Braddock, PA
14	EV1014	In the Last Place You'd Expect	Montreal Style Bagel	Alex Guarnaschelli	The Purple House	North Yarmouth, ME

== Season 11 ==
Episode	Show Number	Topic	Item	Chef/Host	Restaurant	Location
1	EV1101	Desert Island Dish	Paella Valenciana	Alex Guarnaschelli	Black Bull	Chicago, IL
1	EV1101	Desert Island Dish	Blueberry Cake Donuts	Duff Goldman	Paradise Donuts	Baltimore, MD
1	EV1101	Desert Island Dish	Chuleta Kan Kan (Pork Chop)	Monti Carlo	La Fabrica Central	Cambridge, MA
1	EV1101	Desert Island Dish	Longganisa Sandwich	Simon Majumdar	Ma'am Sir	Los Angeles, CA
1	EV1101	Desert Island Dish	Latkes Fancy Pants	Katie Pix	Baz Bagel	New York, NY
1	EV1101	Desert Island Dish	Chicken Cheesesteak	Dan Langan	Antonella's Italian Kitchen	Bryn Mawr, PA
1	EV1101	Desert Island Dish	Tiramisu	Wolfgang Puck	Angelini Osteria	Los Angeles, CA
2	EV1102	On Wheels	Angry Lobster Sandwich	Jeff Msuro	The Happy Lobster Truck	Chicago, IL
2	EV1102	On Wheels	The Game Over Sandwich	Brad Miller	Yeastie Boys Bagels	Los Angeles, CA
2	EV1102	On Wheels	Torta de Albondegas	Claudia Sandoval	Corazon de Torta	San Diego, CA
2	EV1102	On Wheels	Fried Bacon Mac 'N' Cheese Bites	Sabin Lomac	The Bacon Truck	Boston, MA
2	EV1102	On Wheels	Carrot Top Dipped Cone	Elena Besser	Mister Dips	Brooklyn, NY
2	EV1102	On Wheels	Buffalo Baby Grilled Cheese	Fanny Slater	CheeseSmith	Wilmington, SC
2	EV1102	On Wheels	Barbacado	Ali Khan	LeRoy and Lewis	Austin, TX
3	EV1103	Thanksgiving	Thanksgiving Po'Boy	Isaac Toups	Parkway Bakery & Tavern	New Orleans, LA
3	EV1103	Thanksgiving	Baked Mac & Cheese (On Thanksgiving Buffet)	Jonathon Sawyer	Adele's	Nashville, TN
3	EV1103	Thanksgiving	Turkey Leg Sandwich	Anne Burrell	Henry Public	Brooklyn, NY
3	EV1103	Thanksgiving	Roasted Quail with Pomme Purée	Jet Tila	L'ATELIER de Joël Robuchon, MGM Grand Resort & Casino	Las Vegas, NV
3	EV1103	Thanksgiving	Churkeychanga	Fanny Slater	Flaming Amy's Burrito Barn	Wilmington, NC
3	EV1103	Thanksgiving	Bacon Cheddar Buttermilk Biscuits	Dan Langan	Manhattan Beach Post	Manhattan Beach, CA
3	EV1103	Thanksgiving	Pumpkin Pie	Andrew Zimmern	Turtle Bread Company	Minneapolis, MN
4	EV1104	Kids' Menu	Grilled Cheese Super Deluxe	Alex Guarnaschelli	Ted's Bulletin	Washington, DC
4	EV1104	Kids' Menu	Steak Frites	Ali Khan	Launderette	Austin, TX
4	EV1104	Kids' Menu	Make Your Own Pizza	Claudia Sandoval	Cucina Urbana	San Diego, CA
4	EV1104	Kids' Menu	Cookie Doughlicious Milkshake	Jet Tila	Legendairy Milkshake Bar	Nashville, TN
4	EV1104	Kids' Menu	Croque Madame Hot Dog	Simon Majumdar	Senate Pub	Cincinnati, OH
4	EV1104	Kids' Menu	Kids Chicken Pho	Isaac Toups	MOPHO	New Orleans, LA
4	EV1104	Kids' Menu	Mac and Cheese with Bacon	Monti Carlo	Button Mash	Los Angeles, CA
5	EV1105	Holiday Delights	Bûche de Noël	Geoffrey Zakarian	Sift Bake Shop	Mystic, CT
5	EV1105	Holiday Delights	Savoy Cut Prime Rib	Brad Miller	Henry's Savoy Grill	Wilmington, DE
5	EV1105	Holiday Delights	Matzo Ball Caldo	Antonia Lofaso	June's All Day	Austin, TX
5	EV1105	Holiday Delights	Oatmeal Toffee Cookies	Katie Pix	The Sycamore Kitchen	Los Angeles, CA
5	EV1105	Holiday Delights	Short Rib "Pot Roast"	Jernard Wells	The FEED Co. Table & Tavern	Chattanooga, TN
5	EV1105	Holiday Delights	Beef Tamales & Chicharrón Tamales	Claudia Sandoval	Tamales Ancira	San Diego, CA
5	EV1105	Holiday Delights	Original "OG" Egg Rolls	Andrew Zimmern	Nom Wah Tea Parlor	New York, NY
6	EV1106	Low and Slow	Burnt Ends Sandwich	Wolfgang Puck	APL Restaurant	Los Angeles, CA
6	EV1106	Low and Slow	Cavatelli	Antonia Lofaso	Coppa	Boston, MA
6	EV1106	Low and Slow	Carne Adovada & Eggs	Beau MacMillan	Richardson's	Phoenix, AZ
6	EV1106	Low and Slow	Whole Hog Pork Sandwich	Justin Brunson	Sam Jones BBQ	Asheville, NC
6	EV1106	Low and Slow	Ribs	Dan Kohler	Saw's BBQ	Homewood, AL
6	EV1106	Low and Slow	Curried Gumbo	Isaac Toups	Marjie's Grill	New Orleans, LA
6	EV1106	Low and Slow	Moist Brisket	Geoffrey Zakarian	Hill Country BBQ	New York, NY
7	EV1107	Pie's the Limit	St. Louie Pizza	Anne Burrell	Speedy Romeo	New York, NY
7	EV1107	Pie's the Limit	Mango & Passion Fruit Cream Pie	Wolfgang Puck	Republique	Los Angeles, CA
7	EV1107	Pie's the Limit	Taco Pizza	Courtney Rada	Tony Boloney's	Hoboken, NJ
7	EV1107	Pie's the Limit	German Chocolate Pie	Bev Weidner	The Upper Crust	Overland Park, KS
7	EV1107	Pie's the Limit	Detroit Deep Dish Pizza	Justin Brunson	Tomaso's Pizza	Cedar Rapids, IA
7	EV1107	Pie's the Limit	Chicken Pot Pie	Kristen Kish	Holy Roller	Austin, TX
7	EV1107	Pie's the Limit	Kentucky Bacon Pie™	Jason Smith	One Nineteen West Main	La Grange, KY
8	EV1108	On the Waterfront	Fried Lobster Platter	Duff Goldman	Seafood Sam's	Sandwich, MA
8	EV1108	On the Waterfront	Cavatelli, Lamb Ragu, Chili	Anne Burrell	Cecconi's Dumbo	Brooklyn, NY
8	EV1108	On the Waterfront	Roast Chicken	Jeff Mauro	River Roast	Chicago, IL
8	EV1108	On the Waterfront	Spicy Pork Tacos	Casey Webb	MOGO Korean Fusion Tacos	Asbury Park, NJ
8	EV1108	On the Waterfront	Seafood Club	Kardea Brown	Bo Brooks Restaurant	Baltimore, MD
8	EV1108	On the Waterfront	Icelandic Cod Fish & Chips	Brad Miller	Water Grill	Santa Monica, CA
8	EV1108	On the Waterfront	Water Works Meatloaf	Robert Irvine	Ulele	Tampa, FL
9	EV1109	Borrowed Favorites	Beef Wellington	Duff Goldman	The Magic Castle	Hollywood, CA
9	EV1109	Borrowed Favorites	Rohan Duck	Alex Guarnaschelli	Sepia	Chicago, IL
9	EV1109	Borrowed Favorites	Boo's Pepper Steak	Sabin Lomac	Boo's Philly Cheesesteaks	Los Angeles, CA
9	EV1109	Borrowed Favorites	The Bumblebee	Monti Carlo	Welcome Diner	Phoenix, AZ
9	EV1109	Borrowed Favorites	Chicken Vesuvio	Dan Kohler	Francesco's Hole in the Wall	Northbrook, IL
9	EV1109	Borrowed Favorites	Crispy Hominy	Jonathon Sawyer	Michael's Genuine Food & Drink	Miami, FL
9	EV1109	Borrowed Favorites	Lolo Rick's Adobo Fried Rice	Robert Irvine	Babystacks Cafe	Las Vegas, NV
10	EV1110	Stacked	Large Seafood Platter	Wolfgang Puck	Cassia	Santa Monica, CA
10	EV1110	Stacked	Trailer Park Burger	Fanny Slater	Winnie's Tavern	Wilmington, NC
10	EV1110	Stacked	BBQ Bacon Chicken Fries	Katie Pix	Mr. Fries Man	Gardena, CA
10	EV1110	Stacked	Fried Chicken & Eggnog Waffles	Jernard Wells	Melba's	Harlem, NY
10	EV1110	Stacked	Pork Cracklin' Nachos	Marc Murphy	Kingfish	New Orleans, LA
10	EV1110	Stacked	Blackberry Bliss Cakes	Pati Jinich	M. Henry	Chicago, IL
10	EV1110	Stacked	Surfer Sandwich	Katie Lee	Anna's Deli	Siesta Key, FL
11	EV1111	Stretchy Pants Required	The Fat Club	Anne Burrell	Little Goat Diner	Chicago, IL
11	EV1111	Stretchy Pants Required	XL Corned Beef & Pastrami Sandwich	Courtney Rada	Harold's New York Deli Restaurant	Edison, NJ
11	EV1111	Stretchy Pants Required	Cacio e Pepe Pizza	Katie Lee	Pizzana	Brentwood, CA
11	EV1111	Stretchy Pants Required	Cola Glazed Ribs	Kardea Brown	The Pig & Pint	Jackson, MS
11	EV1111	Stretchy Pants Required	Cielo Mar y Tierra Molcajete (Earth, Sea & Sky)	Justin Brunson	Adelitas Cocina y Cantina	Denver, CO
11	EV1111	Stretchy Pants Required	12 Layer Red Velvet Cake	Jernard Wells	Southern Art & Bourbon Bar	Atlanta, GA
11	EV1111	Stretchy Pants Required	Korean BBQ	Antonia Lofaso	Park's BBQ	Los Angeles, CA
12	EV1112	More Than I Can Count!	BBQ Chicken	Andrew Zimmern	Miss Myra's Pit Bar-B-Q	Birmingham, AL
12	EV1112	More Than I Can Count!	Norcia Pizza	Pati Jinich	2 Amy's Neapolitan Pizzeria	Washington, DC
12	EV1112	More Than I Can Count!	Double Bison Burger	Courtney Rada	Tony Beef	Galloway, NJ
12	EV1112	More Than I Can Count!	Pappardelle Pasta	Elena Besser	Popina	Brooklyn, NY
12	EV1112	More Than I Can Count!	Everything Bagel with Pastrami	Jonathon Sawyer	The Lox Bagel Shop	Columbus, OH
12	EV1112	More Than I Can Count!	Salted, Malted, Chocolate Chip; Cookie Dough Ice Cream	Aarti Sequeira	Salt & Straw	West Hollywood, CA
12	EV1112	More Than I Can Count!	Jumbo Lump Crab Cake	Duff Goldman	Faidley Seafood	Baltimore, MD
13	EV1113	Fried and Gone to Heaven	O.G. Classic Hot Chicken Sandwich	Ali Khan	Tumble 22 Hot Chicken	Austin, TX
13	EV1113	Fried and Gone to Heaven	Crispy Pata (Pork Shank)	Simon Majumdar	Salo-Salo Grill	West Covina, CA
13	EV1113	Fried and Gone to Heaven	Tempura Elotes	Jeff Mauro	Proxi	Chicago, IL
13	EV1113	Fried and Gone to Heaven	Donut Breakfast Sandwich	Shinmin Li	Straw	San Francisco, CA
13	EV1113	Fried and Gone to Heaven	Chicken Fried Ribs	Marc Murphy	Fox Bros. Bar-B-Q	Atlanta, GA
13	EV1113	Fried and Gone to Heaven	Fried Sugar Toads	Elena Besser	The Dabney	Washington, DC
13	EV1113	Fried and Gone to Heaven	Crispy Pig Ears	Pati Jinich	Pizzeria Toro	Durham, NC
14	EV1114	Buttered Up	Cajun Shrimp & Grits	Alex Guarnaschelli	Tillies	Short Hills, NJ
14	EV1114	Buttered Up	Honey Butter Fried Chicken Sandwich	Jeff Mauro	Honey Butter Fried Chicken	Chicago, IL
14	EV1114	Buttered Up	Brown Butter Key Lime Donut	Richard Blais	Du's Donuts and Coffee	Brooklyn, NY
14	EV1114	Buttered Up	Pure Butter Croissants	Justin Brunson	Ken's Artisan Bakery	Portland, OR
14	EV1114	Buttered Up	Brown Butter Lobster Roll	Marc Murphy	Eventide Oyster Co.	Portland, ME
14	EV1114	Buttered Up	Buttercake	Dan Langan	Flying Monkey Bakery	Philadelphia, PA
14	EV1114	Buttered Up	Tropical Sundae	Geoffrey Zakarian	abcV	New York, NY

== Seasons 12 and 13 ==
According to the Cooking Channel website, episodes for seasons 12 and 13 have been produced and aired, presumably in 2021 and 2022, respectively. However, as of 2024, these episodes have not been posted to the Max service (current streaming service for Discovery networks), and only selected episodes of season 12 are available through their FOOD NETWORK GO and COOKING CHANNEL GO services.

== All-Star Best Thing I Ever Ate ==
In 2020, the Food Network aired an eight-episode hour-long series spin-off of the show entitled All-Star Best Thing I Ever Ate, featuring the network's biggest chefs sharing both their favorite foods & locations along with some of their own recipes fitting the given subject. Episodes consisted of newly recorded segments and reused footage from both older episodes and (in the case of the "CHEF'S RECIPE" entries below) the presenters' cooking shows.

Episode	Show Number	Topic	Item	Chef/Host	Restaurant/Recipe	Location
1	Unknown	Sensational Sandwiches	Italian Sub	Guy Fieri	White House Subs	Atlantic City, NJ
1	Unknown	Sensational Sandwiches	Pork Roast Sandwich	Rachael Ray	Tony Luke's	Philadelphia, PA
1	Unknown	Sensational Sandwiches	Cheesesteak	Alton Brown	Fred's Meat & Bread	Atlanta, GA
1	Unknown	Sensational Sandwiches	Roasted Turkey Sandwich	Alex Guarnaschelli	CHEF'S RECIPE	N/A
1	Unknown	Sensational Sandwiches	Adobo Lamb Biscuit	Carla Hall	Mason Dixie Biscuit Co.	Washington, DC
1	Unknown	Sensational Sandwiches	The Schmitter	Duff Goldman	McNally's Tavern	Philadelphia, PA
1	Unknown	Sensational Sandwiches	The Fat Club	Anne Burrell	Little Goat Diner	Chicago, IL
1	Unknown	Sensational Sandwiches	Smoked Meat Sandwich	Alex Guarnaschelli	Mile End Deli	Brooklyn, NY
1	Unknown	Sensational Sandwiches	Pulled Pork Sandwich	Anne Burrell	CHEF'S RECIPE	N/A
1	Unknown	Sensational Sandwiches	Roast Beef & Mutz	Buddy Valastro	Fiore's Deli	Hoboken, NJ
1	Unknown	Sensational Sandwiches	Seafood Club	Kardea Brown	Bo Brooks Restaurant	Baltimore, MD
1	Unknown	Sensational Sandwiches	Chicken Parmigiano	Ali Khan	Bricco Salumeria & Pasta Shop	Boston, MA
1	Unknown	Sensational Sandwiches	Croque Madame	Valerie Bertinelli	Petit Trois	Los Angeles, CA
1	Unknown	Sensational Sandwiches	Lobster Roll	Bobby Flay	CHEF'S RECIPE	N/A
2	Unknown	Pizza and Burgers	Bacon Mac-and-Cheese Burger	Robert Irvine	Guy Fieri's Vegas Kitchen & Bar	Las Vegas, NV
2	Unknown	Pizza and Burgers	Original Tomato Pie	Alex Guarnaschelli	Frank Pepe Pizzeria Napoletana	New Haven, CT
2	Unknown	Pizza and Burgers	Duck & Beef Burger	Tragaye Fraser	Canoe	Atlanta, GA
2	Unknown	Pizza and Burgers	Crab Rangoon Pizza	Alton Brown	Fong's Pizza & Tiki Bar	Des Moines, IA
2	Unknown	Pizza and Burgers	Grilled Pizzas	Alton Brown	CHEF'S RECIPE	N/A
2	Unknown	Pizza and Burgers	Loaded Combo Pizza	Anne Burrell	Lou Malnati's	Chicago, IL
2	Unknown	Pizza and Burgers	Alfie's Bun	Eddie Jackson	Lucky Buns	Washington, DC
2	Unknown	Pizza and Burgers	Spicy Pork Burger	Alex Guarnaschelli	CHEF'S RECIPE	N/A
2	Unknown	Pizza and Burgers	Apollonia Pizza	Scott Conant	Una Pizza Napoletana	New York, NY
2	Unknown	Pizza and Burgers	PQM Burger	Marcus Samuelsson	Publican Quality Meats	Chicago, IL
2	Unknown	Pizza and Burgers	Corn Pizza	Katie Lee	Al Forno	Providence, RI
2	Unknown	Pizza and Burgers	Tamago Burger	Jet Tila	Fukuburger	Las Vegas, NV
2	Unknown	Pizza and Burgers	Build Your Own Pizza	Duff Goldman	Joe Squared	Baltimore, MD
2	Unknown	Pizza and Burgers	Shouk Burger	Carla Hall	Shouk	Washington, DC
2	Unknown	Pizza and Burgers	Pimento Cheese Burger	Bobby Flay	CHEF'S RECIPE	N/A
3	Unknown	Deep-Fried Decadence	Fried Chicken	Bobby Flay	Bubby's	New York, NY
3	Unknown	Deep-Fried Decadence	Tempura Elotes	Jeff Mauro	Proxi	Chicago, IL
3	Unknown	Deep-Fried Decadence	Lolo Rick's Adobo Fried Rice	Robert Irvine	Babystacks Cafe	Las Vegas, NV
3	Unknown	Deep-Fried Decadence	Pate a Choux Churros	Valerie Bertinelli	CHEF'S RECIPE	N/A
3	Unknown	Deep-Fried Decadence	Milos Special	Martha Stewart	Estiatorio Milos	New York, NY
3	Unknown	Deep-Fried Decadence	Veal Parmigiana	Alex Guarnaschelli	Chef Vola's	Atlantic City, NJ
3	Unknown	Deep-Fried Decadence	Cheesecake Beignets	Tregaye Fraser	Tuscarora Mill	Leesburg, VA
3	Unknown	Deep-Fried Decadence	Fried Cheesy Pickles	Molly Yeh	The Toasted Frog	Grand Forks, ND
3	Unknown	Deep-Fried Decadence	Fried Tuna Sticks	Sunny Anderson	CHEF'S RECIPE	N/A
3	Unknown	Deep-Fried Decadence	Tots with Caviar	Scott Conant	Snack Boys	Milwaukee, WI
3	Unknown	Deep-Fried Decadence	Potato Latkes	Antonia Lofaso	Russ & Daughters	New York, NY
3	Unknown	Deep-Fried Decadence	Kung Pao Chicken	Geoffrey Zakarian	Cafe China	New York, NY
3	Unknown	Deep-Fried Decadence	Fried Lobster Platter	Duff Goldman	Seafood Sam's	Sandwich, MA
3	Unknown	Deep-Fried Decadence	Fried Chicken & Fixin's	Marcus Samuelsson	Charles' Country Pan Fried Chicken	Harlem, NY
3	Unknown	Deep-Fried Decadence	Buffalo Fries	Katie Lee	Townline BBQ	Sagaponack, NY
3	Unknown	Deep-Fried Decadence	Chicken-Fried Steak	Alton Brown	CHEF'S RECIPE	N/A
4	Unknown	Marvelous Meats	Rib Eye Cap	Bobby Flay	Salt & Char	Saratoga Springs, NY
4	Unknown	Marvelous Meats	Carne Asada Burrito	Guy Fieri	Roberto's Taco Shop	Las Vegas, NV
4	Unknown	Marvelous Meats	Beef Wellington	Alton Brown	Marcel	Atlanta, GA
4	Unknown	Marvelous Meats	Crown Roast of Pork	Anne Burrell	CHEF'S RECIPE	N/A
4	Unknown	Marvelous Meats	Braised Pork Shoulder	Anne Burrell	Purple Pig	Chicago, IL
4	Unknown	Marvelous Meats	Oxtail	Carla Hall	Cooks & Captains	Brooklyn, NY
4	Unknown	Marvelous Meats	Meatball & Salad	Geoffrey Zakarian	Cafe Martorano	Ft. Lauderdale, FL
4	Unknown	Marvelous Meats	Rohan Duck	Alex Guarnaschelli	Sepia	Chicago, IL
4	Unknown	Marvelous Meats	Lasagna Bolognese	Alex Guarnaschelli	CHEF'S RECIPE	N/A
4	Unknown	Marvelous Meats	Fondue Burger	Tregaye Fraser	Clinton Hall	New York, NY
4	Unknown	Marvelous Meats	The Mega Threat	Duff Goldman	Charcoal Style	White Marsh, MD
4	Unknown	Marvelous Meats	Lamb Shoulder	Molly Yeh	Zahav	Philadelphia, PA
4	Unknown	Marvelous Meats	Roast Duck Flambé	Eddie Jackson	Beatrice Inn	New York, NY
4	Unknown	Marvelous Meats	Rib-Eye Steak	Bobby Flay	CHEF'S RECIPE	N/A
5	Unknown	Magical Combos	Jive Turkey Waffle	Guy Fieri	Funk 'n Waffles	Syracuse, NY
5	Unknown	Magical Combos	Blue Crab Beignets	Alex Guarnaschelli	La Petite Grocery	New Orleans, LA
5	Unknown	Magical Combos	Mac 'N' Cheese Chicken Cone	Tregaye Fraser	Chick'nCone	New York, NY
5	Unknown	Magical Combos	Rimaki	Valerie Bertinelli	CHEF'S RECIPE	N/A
5	Unknown	Magical Combos	Oh My Luther Burger	Duff Goldman	Oh My Burger	Gardena, CA
5	Unknown	Magical Combos	The "Bloody Best" Bloody Mary	Jeff Mauro	Chef Point Café	Watauga, TX
5	Unknown	Magical Combos	The Rebel Within	Molly Yeh	Craftsman & Wolves	San Francisco, CA
5	Unknown	Magical Combos	Nutella Lasagna	Geoffrey Zakarian	Robicelli's	Brooklyn, NY
5	Unknown	Magical Combos	The Gertie	Aarti Sequeira	Biscuit Love	Nashville, TN
5	Unknown	Magical Combos	Cinnamon Toast Pudding	Sunny Anderson	CHEF'S RECIPE	N/A
5	Unknown	Magical Combos	"Cleveland" Nachos	Michael Symon	Fahrenheit	Cleveland, OH
5	Unknown	Magical Combos	Giant Cannoli	Carla Hall	Rito's Bakery & Deli	Cleveland, OH
5	Unknown	Magical Combos	Matzo Ball Caldo	Antonia Lofaso	June's All Day	Austin, TX
5	Unknown	Magical Combos	Tikka French Toast	Ali Khan	Rasika (West End)	Washington, DC
5	Unknown	Magical Combos	Steak Tartare	Alton Brown	CHEF'S RECIPE	N/A
5	Unknown	Magical Combos	Roasted Quail with Pomme Purée	Jet Tila	L'Atelier de Joël Robuchon, MGM Grand	Las Vegas, NV
6	Unknown	Brilliant Barbecue	Hoe Cakes	Valerie Bertinelli	Barrel & Ashes	Studio City, CA
6	Unknown	Brilliant Barbecue	Pulled Pork Benedict	Alex Guarnaschelli	Smoke Daddy	Chicago, IL
6	Unknown	Brilliant Barbecue	Wagyu Brisket Sandwich	Carla Hall	Del Campo	Washington, DC
6	Unknown	Brilliant Barbecue	Spiced Rubbed Brisket	Bobby Flay	CHEF'S RECIPE	N/A
6	Unknown	Brilliant Barbecue	The Showstopper	Duff Goldman	The Corner Stable	Columbia, MD
6	Unknown	Brilliant Barbecue	Bar-B-Que Pork Ribs	Anne Burrell	Dinosaur Bar-B-Que	Harlem, NY
6	Unknown	Brilliant Barbecue	Korean BBQ	Antonia Lofaso	Park's BBQ	Los Angeles, CA
6	Unknown	Brilliant Barbecue	Burnt Ends Sandwich	Wolfgang Puck	APL Restaurant	Los Angeles, CA
6	Unknown	Brilliant Barbecue	Saint Louis Ribs	Alton Brown	CHEF'S RECIPE	N/A
6	Unknown	Brilliant Barbecue	Barbacado	Ali Khan	LeRoy and Lewis	Austin, TX
6	Unknown	Brilliant Barbecue	Turkey Ribs	Tregaye Fraser	Tom, Dick & Hank	Atlanta, GA
6	Unknown	Brilliant Barbecue	The Everything Plate	Buddy Valastro	Fox Bros. BAR-B-Q	Atlanta, GA
6	Unknown	Brilliant Barbecue	Moist Brisket	Geoffrey Zakarian	Hill Country BBQ	New York, NY
6	Unknown	Brilliant Barbecue	Chicken Thighs	Valerie Bertinelli	CHEF'S RECIPE	N/A
6	Unknown	Brilliant Barbecue	Whole Hog Sandwich	Roger Mooking	Rodney Scott's Whole Hog BBQ	Charleston, SC
7	Unknown	Unbeatable Breakfast	Apple Crumb Donut	Alex Guarnaschelli	Peter Pan Donut & Pastry Shop	Brooklyn, NY
7	Unknown	Unbeatable Breakfast	Sweet Baby Jesus	Duff Goldman	Blue Moon Café	Baltimore, MD
7	Unknown	Unbeatable Breakfast	The Cap & Egg	Rachael Ray	Primanti Brothers	Pittsburgh, PA
7	Unknown	Unbeatable Breakfast	Lemon Ricotta Pancakes	Anne Burrell	CHEF'S RECIPE	N/A
7	Unknown	Unbeatable Breakfast	Chicken Before the Egg	Michael Symon	Grove Hill	Chagrin Falls, OH
7	Unknown	Unbeatable Breakfast	Tuna Paninetti All'Olio	Geoffrey Zakarian	Sant Ambroeus	New York, NY
7	Unknown	Unbeatable Breakfast	Belly Benedict	Tregaye Fraser	Sun in My Belly	Atlanta, GA
7	Unknown	Unbeatable Breakfast	100 Layer Doughnut	Jeff Mauro	Five Daughters Bakery	Nashville, TN
7	Unknown	Unbeatable Breakfast	Your Own Blended Pork; Sausage and Fried Eggs	Alex Guarnaschelli	CHEF'S RECIPE	N/A
7	Unknown	Unbeatable Breakfast	French Toast	Scott Conant	Bardot Brasserie	Las Vegas, NV
7	Unknown	Unbeatable Breakfast	Grits, Country Ham & Biscuits	Martha Stewart	Loveless Café	Nashville, TN
7	Unknown	Unbeatable Breakfast	Mushroom Toast	Antonia Lofaso	République	Los Angeles, CA
7	Unknown	Unbeatable Breakfast	Yukon Gold Cinnamon Roll	Alton Brown	Scarlett Begonia	Santa Barbara, CA
7	Unknown	Unbeatable Breakfast	Breakfast Pie	Sunny Anderson	CHEF'S RECIPE	N/A
7	Unknown	Unbeatable Breakfast	Chocolate Tower French Toast	Carla Hall	Bongo Room	Chicago, IL
8	Unknown	Supreme Sweets	Glazed Donuts	Alton Brown	Gibson's Donuts	Memphis, TN
8	Unknown	Supreme Sweets	14K Chocolate Cake	Jeff Mauro	RPM Steak	Chicago, IL
8	Unknown	Supreme Sweets	Bacon Babka	Alex Guarnaschelli	Supper	Philadelphia, PA
8	Unknown	Supreme Sweets	Mango Tart w/Tequila-Lime Glaze	Valerie Bertinelli	CHEF'S RECIPE	N/A
8	Unknown	Supreme Sweets	Bea Arthur	Anne Burrell	Big Gay Ice Cream	New York, NY
8	Unknown	Supreme Sweets	Apple Tarte Tatin	Carla Hall	Gato	New York, NY
8	Unknown	Supreme Sweets	Cookie Doughlicious Milkshake	Jet Tila	Legendairy Milkshake Bar	Nashville, TN
8	Unknown	Supreme Sweets	"Party Like It's Your Birthday" Cake	Duff Goldman	Serendipity 3	Las Vegas, NV
8	Unknown	Supreme Sweets	Orange Sugar Fried Donut Holes	Sunny Anderson	CHEF'S RECIPE	N/A
8	Unknown	Supreme Sweets	Chocolate Soufflé	Geoffrey Zakarian	Le Cirque	New York, NY
8	Unknown	Supreme Sweets	Lemon Meringue Tart	Martha Stewart	Cipriani	New York, NY
8	Unknown	Supreme Sweets	Jumbo Cupcakes	Lorraine Pascale	Simona's Bakery	Sea Girt, NJ
8	Unknown	Supreme Sweets	The Strawberry Blonde Cheesecake	Robert Irvine	Brooklyn Diner	New York, NY
8	Unknown	Supreme Sweets	Sticky Toffee Pudding	Anne Burrell	CHEF'S RECIPE	N/A
8	Unknown	Supreme Sweets	Olive Oil Mint Cake	Molly Yeh	The Exchange Restaurant	Los Angeles, CA

== See also ==
- List of The Best Thing I Ever Ate episodes
