= Upstairs On the Square =

- Interactive map of Upstairs On the Square

Restaurant information
- Established: 1992
- Closed: December 21, 2013
- Location: 91 Winthrop Street, Cambridge, Massachusetts, 02138, United States
- Coordinates: 42°22′21″N 71°07′15″W

Upstairs On the Square, originally UpStairs at the Pudding (because of the original location above Harvard's Hasty Pudding Club), ended "its storied 31-year run" on December 31, 2013. Owned by Mary-Catherine Deibel and Deborah Hughes, the building they were in was being sold by the landlord.

Their menu has been described as "adventurous classic European".

In 2012, Hughes' daughter Charlotte Silver published a memoir about growing up at the restaurant, Charlotte Au Chocolat: Memories of a Restaurant Girlhood.

== History ==
Opened in 1982 as Upstairs at the Pudding, they had a small dining room three flights above the Hasty Pudding Club. A favorite of the locals, they also attracted many celebrities. Ella Fitzgerald sang 'Happy Birthday' to one of the sous chefs. Julia Roberts smoked a cigarette in the coatroom "and turned to (the staff) and said, 'Shhh, don't tell.'"

In 2002, they relocated to Winthrop Street, also in Harvard Square.

== Awards and honors ==
Their Eggs Benedict was featured on The Best Thing I Ever Ate.
