= Ferdinando's Focacceria =

Sicilian restaurant in New York City

- Interactive map of Ferdinando's Focacceria

Restaurant information
- Established: 1904
- Closed: 2025
- Location: 151 Union Street, Brooklyn, New York, 11231, United States
- Coordinates: 40°41′3.5″N 74°0′6.5″W

Ferdinando's Focacceria, founded in 1904 and closed in 2025, was New York City's oldest Sicilian restaurant. It was the third oldest Italian restaurant behind Rao's and Bamonte's. It is located at 151 Union Street in the Columbia Street Waterfront District of Brooklyn.

Panelle was their most popular dish.

== History ==
Ferdinando’s was near the Brooklyn waterfront and they were a sandwich shop for the longshoremen working there. After 121 years in operation, the restaurant was sold to Sal Lamboglia, who owns several other businesses in the neighborhood, and renamed Bar Ferdinando.

== In popular culture ==
The restaurant appeared in The Departed by Martin Scorsese.
