= Food Network Star season 12 =

Food Network Star
- Season 12
- No. of contestants: 13
- Winner: Tregaye Fraser
- No. of episodes: 11

Release
- Original network: Food Network
- Original release: May 22 – July 31, 2016

Season chronology
- ← Previous; Season 11 Next → Season 13

The twelfth season of the American reality television series Food Network Star premiered May 22, 2016 on Food Network. Food Network chefs Bobby Flay and Giada de Laurentiis returned to the series as judges.

This season featured thirteen contestants rather than twelve; the thirteenth contestant, Martita Jara (who originally appeared in the series' eighth season), was chosen via a three-week spin-off series called Comeback Kitchen, where seven former Food Network Star contestants competed for a chance to participate in season 12 of the main series. Comeback Kitchen was hosted by chef Tyler Florence and chef/actress Valerie Bertinelli; and it premiered on May 8, 2016, although it initially became available on demand in some markets in April 2016. This season also continued the inclusion of Star Salvation, a six-week webseries that featured the most recently eliminated contestant competing against the remaining previously eliminated contestants for a chance to re-enter the main Food Network Star competition.

Unlike previous seasons, executives Bob Tuschman and Susie Fogelson did not assist in the judging; nor did chief executive Brooke Johnson appear in the finale to introduce the winner (Tuschman left Food Network and Johnson retired prior to the start of the season).

== Contestants ==
=== Winner ===
- Tregaye Fraser – Atlanta, Georgia

=== Runners-up ===
- Jernard Wells – Atlanta, Georgia
- Damiano Carrara – Moorpark, California

=== Eliminated ===
(in order of elimination)

- Havird Usry – Augusta, Georgia
- Aaron Crumbaugh – Spokane, Washington
- Melissa Pfeister – Los Angeles, California
- Martita Jara – San Diego, California
- Monterey Salka – Nashville, Tennessee
- Rob Burmeister – Staten Island, New York
- Joy Thompson – Thomasville, North Carolina
- Erin Campbell – Woodbury, Minnesota
- Ana Quincoces – Coral Gables, Florida
- Yaku Moton-Spruill – San Francisco, California

== Contestant progress ==
Contestant	Week										
Contestant	1	2	3	4^{1}	5	6	7	8	9	10	11
Mentor; Challenge; Winner	—N/a	Erin; Martita; Joy; Damiano	Tregaye	Monterey; Jernard; Yaku	Damiano	Tregaye; Damiano	Tregaye	Tregaye	Jernard	Jernard; Damiano	—N/a
Tregaye	IN	HIGH	LOW	HIGH	HIGH	HIGH	IN	HIGH	IN	LOW	WINNER
Jernard	IN	HIGH	HIGH	LOW	HIGH	HIGH	HIGH	LOW	LOW	IN	RUNNER-UP
Damiano	IN	HIGH	IN	HIGH	IN	IN	IN	HIGH	IN	IN	RUNNER-UP^{4}
Yaku	IN	IN	LOW	OUT						OUT^{2}	
Ana	HIGH	HIGH	LOW	HIGH	LOW	IN	LOW	LOW	OUT		
Erin	IN	LOW	IN	IN	IN	IN	HIGH	OUT			
Joy	IN	IN	HIGH	IN	HIGH	LOW	OUT				
Rob	HIGH	HIGH	IN	LOW	LOW	OUT					
Monterey	HIGH	LOW	IN	IN	OUT						
Martita	IN	HIGH	OUT								
Aaron	LOW	OUT									
Melissa	LOW	OUT^{3}									
Havird	OUT										

^Note 1 : Because of the challenge outcome, the judges did not select a winning team. Instead, they identified the three best individual cooks.
^Note 2 : Yaku returned to the competition after winning Star Salvation.
^Note 3 : Melissa did not appear in the finale.
^Note 4 : Damiano was eliminated from the final three midway through the finale.

(WINNER) The contestant won the competition and thus became the next Food Network Star.
(RUNNER-UP) The contestant made it to the finale, but did not win.
(HIGH) The contestant was one of the selection committee's favorites for that week.
(IN) The contestant performed well enough to move on to the next week.
(LOW) The contestant was one of the selection committee's least favorites for that week, but was not eliminated.
(OUT) The contestant was the selection committee's least favorite for that week, and was eliminated.

== Comeback Kitchen contestants ==
Contestant	Orig. season
Penny Davidi	7
Matthew Grunwald	11
Martita Jara	8
Brianna Jenkins	6
Chris Kyler	10
Michele Ragussis	8
Dom Tesoriero	11

=== Contestant progress ===
Contestant	Week		
Contestant	1	2	3
Martita	IN	IN	WIN
Dom	LOW	IN	OUT
Matthew	IN	IN	OUT
Michele	IN	IN	OUT
Chris	IN	IN	OUT^{1}
Penny	LOW	OUT	
Brianna	OUT		

^Note 1 : Chris was eliminated after the mentor challenge.

(WIN) The chef won Comeback Kitchen and returned to the main competition.
(IN) The contestant performed well enough to move on to the next week.
(LOW) The contestant was one of the selection committee's least favorites for that week, but was not eliminated.
(OUT) The contestant was the selection committee's least favorite for that week, and was eliminated.

== Star Salvation ==
This season of Star Salvation was hosted by Iron Chef Alex Guarnaschelli and season 11 winner Eddie Jackson.

=== Contestant progress ===
Contestant	Week					
Contestant	1	2	3	4	5	6
Yaku	IN	IN	IN	IN	IN	WIN
Monterey		IN	IN	IN	IN	OUT
Ana						OUT
Erin					OUT	
Joy				OUT		
Rob			OUT			
Aaron	IN	OUT				
Havird	OUT					

(WIN) The chef won Star Salvation and returned to the main competition.
(IN) The chef continued in the competition.
(OUT) The chef lost in that week's Star Salvation and was eliminated from the competition.
