= Food Network Star season 11 =

Food Network Star
- Season 11
- No. of contestants: 12
- Winner: Eddie Jackson
- No. of episodes: 11

Release
- Original network: Food Network
- Original release: June 7 – August 16, 2015

Season chronology
- ← Previous; Season 10 Next → Season 12

The eleventh season of the American reality television series Food Network Star premiered June 7, 2015 on Food Network. Food Network chefs Bobby Flay and Giada de Laurentiis returned to the series as judges, with Alton Brown not returning for undisclosed reasons. This season also continued the inclusion of Star Salvation, a six-week webseries that featured the most recently eliminated contestant competing against the remaining previously eliminated contestants for a chance to re-enter the main Food Network Star competition.

This season also returned to the practice of the winner of the competition being chosen by the Food Network staff, rather than by viewers as in the three previous seasons.

== Contestants ==
=== Winner ===
- Eddie Jackson – Richardson, Texas

=== Runners-up ===
- Jay Ducote – Baton Rouge, Louisiana
- Dominick "Dom" Tesoriero – Staten Island, New York

=== Eliminated ===
(In order of elimination)

- Christina Fitzgerald –St. Louis, Missouri
- Matthew Grunwald –Scottsdale, Arizona
- Sita Lewis – New York, New York
- Rosa Graziano – Los Angeles, California
- Rue Rusike – Brooklyn, New York
- Emilia Cirker – Reston, Virginia
- Michelle Karam – Santa Barbara, California (withdrew)
- ~~Dominick "Dom" Tesoriero – Staten Island, New York~~ (Returned to competition after winning Star Salvation)
- Alex McCoy – Washington D.C.
- Arnold Myint – Nashville, Tennessee

== Contestant progress ==
Contestant	1	2	3	4	5	6	7	8	9	10	11
Mentor; Challenge; Winner	—	—	Dom	—	Rue	Eddie	Jay	Alex	Eddie	—	—
Eddie	HIGH	HIGH	LOW	WIN	HIGH	HIGH	LOW	LOW	HIGH	LOW	WINNER
Jay	HIGH	IN	IN	IN	HIGH	HIGH	HIGH	HIGH	HIGH	HIGH	RUNNER-UP
Dom	LOW	IN	HIGH	LOW	LOW	LOW	LOW	OUT		IN	RUNNER-UP
Arnold	HIGH	HIGH	HIGH	WIN	LOW	IN	HIGH	LOW	LOW	OUT	
Alex	IN	IN	IN	WIN	HIGH	LOW	LOW	HIGH	OUT		
Michelle	IN	IN	WIN	LOW	LOW	IN	QUIT				
Emilia	IN	LOW	IN	IN	HIGH	OUT					
Rue	IN	IN	IN	IN	OUT						
Rosa	IN	IN	LOW	OUT							
Sita	IN	LOW	OUT								
Matthew	LOW	OUT									
Christina	OUT										

(WINNER) The contestant won the competition and became the next "Food Network Star".
(RUNNER-UP) The contestant made it to the finale, but did not win.
(WIN) The contestant won the challenge for that week.
(RETURNED) The contestant won Star Salvation and returned to the main competition.
(HIGH) The contestant was one of the selection committee's favorites for that week.
(IN) The contestant performed well enough to move on to the next week.
(LOW) The contestant was one of the selection committee's three or four least favorites for that week, but was not eliminated.
(OUT) The contestant was the selection committee's least favorite for that week, and was eliminated.
(QUIT) The contestant voluntarily left the competition.

== Star Salvation ==
This season of Star Salvation was hosted by Iron Chef Alex Guarnaschelli and season 7 winner Jeff Mauro.

Contestant	1	2	3	4^{1}	5	6
Dom					IN	WIN
Rue		IN	IN	IN	IN	OUT
Alex						OUT
Emilia			IN	IN	OUT	
Matthew	IN	IN	IN	OUT		
Christina	IN	IN	OUT			
Rosa	IN	OUT				
Sita	OUT					

^Note 1 : Having withdrawn from the competition, Michelle did not compete in Star Salvation this week.

(WIN) The chef won Star Salvation and returned to the main competition.
(IN) The chef continued in the competition.
(OUT) The chef lost in that week's Star Salvation and was eliminated from the competition.

== Episodes ==
=== Week 1: Food Star Food Festival ===
- Top 3: Jay, Eddie and Arnold
- Bottom 3: Dom, Matthew and Christina
- Eliminated: Christina

=== Week 2: Savory Baking ===
- Top 2: Eddie and Arnold
- Bottom 3: Emilia, Sita and Matthew
- Eliminated: Matthew

=== Week 3: Trendy Dinner ===
- Top 2: Dom and Arnold
- Winner: Michelle
- Bottom 3: Eddie, Rosa and Sita
- Eliminated: Sita

=== Week 4: 4th of July Cookout ===
- Winners: Eddie, Arnold and Alex
- Bottom 3: Dom, Michelle and Rosa
- Eliminated: Rosa

=== Week 5: The Perfect Match ===
- Top 4: Eddie, Alex, Jay and Emilia
- Bottom 4: Arnold, Dom, Michelle and Rue
- Eliminated: Rue

=== Week 6: Improv ===
- Top 2: Eddie and Jay
- Bottom 3: Alex, Dom and Emilia
- Eliminated: Emilia

=== Week 7: Food Truck Throwdown ===
- Top 2: Jay and Arnold
- Bottom 4: Dom, Eddie, Michelle and Alex
- Withdrew: Michelle^{2}

^Note 2 Michelle chose to withdraw from the competition to be with her family. She did not compete in Star Salvation.

=== Week 8: Lifestyle Brand ===
- Top 2: Jay and Alex
- Bottom 3: Arnold, Eddie and Dom
- Eliminated: Dom

=== Week 9: Live TV ===
- Top 2: Eddie and Jay
- Bottom 2: Arnold and Alex
- Eliminated: Alex

=== Week 10: Dish of a Lifetime and Pilots^{3} ===
- Top: Jay
- Bottom 2: Eddie and Arnold
- Eliminated: Arnold

^Note 3 Dom returned to the competition, having won Star Salvation.

=== Week 11: We Have a Winner ===
- Winner: Eddie
  - Show on Food Network: BBQ Blitz
- Runners-up: Dom and Jay
