= Taste in Translation =

American TV cooking show (2013)

- Genre: Cooking
- Starring: Aarti Sequeira
- Country of origin: United States
- Original language: English
- No. of seasons: 1
- No. of episodes: 6

Production
- Running time: 30 minutes
- Production company: Leopard Films

Original release
- Network: Cooking Channel
- Release: January 4 – February 8, 2013

Taste in Translation is an American Cooking show series produced by Leopard Films that aired on the Cooking Channel in 2013. The series was hosted by Aarti Sequeira, an Indian cook and television personality, who is best known as the winner of the sixth season of Food Network's reality television show, The Next Food Network Star. In the series, Aarti searched for the most popular dishes from around the world and took an in-depth look at the history and cultural significance of the dishes she tasted. Each episode had a different dish theme, such as a barbecue or a birthday theme. The series premiered on January 4, 2013, and concluded on February 8, 2013, after one season.
