= List of Halloween Wars episodes =

Halloween Wars is an American reality competition series that premiered on October 2, 2011 on cable television network Food Network. The show has several teams of three (a cake sculptor, a sugar artist, and a pumpkin carver) that compete to create a Halloween themed display. The last trio standing is awarded $50,000 For season 13 onwards, the winning team is awarded $25,000.

== Series overview ==
Season	Episodes	First Aired	Last Aired
1	4	October 2, 2011	October 23, 2011
2	4	October 7, 2012	October 28, 2012
3	4	October 6, 2013	October 27, 2013
4	4	October 5, 2014	October 26, 2014
5	4	October 4, 2015	October 25, 2015
6	5	October 2, 2016	October 30, 2016
7	5	October 1, 2017	October 29, 2017
Special	3	October 2, 2017	October 16, 2017
8	5	September 30, 2018	October 28, 2018
9	5	September 29, 2019	October 27, 2019
10	5	September 13, 2020	October 11, 2020

== Season 1 (2011) ==
=== Teams ===
Team Tarantula - Susan Notter (sugar), Andrea Carusetta (cake), Michael Natiello (pumpkin)

Bling Bats - Karen Portaleo (cake), Julie Bashore (sugar), Shawn Feeney (pumpkin)

Team Boo! - Ray Villafane (pumpkin), Andrea Reed (cake), Jansen Chan (sugar)

Skulls of the Abyss - Cory Hansen (cake), Chris Maniac (pumpkin), Louise Chien (sugar)

Something Wicked - Pam Leno (pumpkin), Ruby Carlsruh (sugar), Becky Rink (cake)

=== Episodes ===
Season #	Episode #	Episode Title	Original Airdate	Judges
1	1	Witches & Scary Places	October 2, 2011	Shinmin Li Miles Teves Jaime King
Small Scare Challenge: Create a witch. The winners were Bling Bats. Spine Chiller Challenge: Create a haunted location and incorporate edible spiders. The winners were Team Boo! Eliminated Team: Team Tarantula				Shinmin Li Miles Teves Jaime King
1	2	Scary Tales	October 9, 2011	Shinmin Li Miles Teves R.L. Stine
Small Scare Challenge: Each team got a stuffed animal (teddy bear, kitty, duck, & rabbit) and had to create its monstrous counterpart. The winners were Bling Bats. Spine Chiller Challenge: Create a creepy version of a classic fairy tale and incorporate a tasty treat for some visiting trick-or-treaters. The winners were Bling Bats. Eliminated Team: Something Wicked Special Note: Sugar artist Julie Bashore from Team Bling Bats quit her team following an argument in the first episode. She was replaced by Susan Notter from previously eliminated Team Tarantula.				Shinmin Li Miles Teves R.L. Stine
1	3	Zombies vs. Vampires	October 16, 2011	Shinmin Li Miles Teves Rob Zombie
Small Scare Challenge: Create an edible skull in honor of Dia de los Muertos. The winners were Bling Bats. (Instead of an extra assistant, they got first pick of the pumpkin patch.) Spine Chiller Challenge: Create a scene depicting zombies versus vampires and incorporate gooey, edible ooze. The winners were Bling Bats. Eliminated Team: Skulls of the Abyss Special Note: Cake artist Andrea Reed from Team Boo! quit her team due to the pressure she suffered in the second episode. She was replaced by Becky Rink from previously eliminated Team Something Wicked.				Shinmin Li Miles Teves Rob Zombie
1	4	Underworld	October 23, 2011	Shinmin Li Miles Teves Scout Taylor-Compton
Small Scare Challenge: Create a ghost. The winners were Team Boo! Spine Chiller Challenge: Create an interpretation of the underworld and incorporate a spicy treat. The winner of the $50,000 was Team Bling Bats. Eliminated Team: Team Boo!				Shinmin Li Miles Teves Scout Taylor-Compton

== Season 2 (2012) ==
=== Teams ===
No Guts No Gory - Gonzuela Bastarache (cake), Doug Goodreau (pumpkin), Dana Herbert (sugar)

Dead Men Walking - Marc Maniac (pumpkin), Richard Ruskell (sugar), Vinny Garcia (cake)

Paranormal - Ruby Carlsruh^{1} (sugar), Ray Brown (pumpkin), Leigh Henderson (cake)

Morbid Mayhem - Andy Bergholtz (pumpkin), Peggy Tucker (sugar), Barbara Garrard (cake)

Screamish - Charity George (cake), Dean Murray (pumpkin), Darci Rochau (sugar)

^Note 1: Ruby Carlsruh (Team Paranormal) was in season 1 (Team Something Wicked) but lost in the 2nd episode.

=== Episodes ===
Season #	Episode #	Episode Title	Original Airdate	Judges
2	1	Evil Clowns	October 7, 2012	Shinmin Li Tom Savini Shawnee Smith
Small Scare Challenge: Create either a ghoul or a goblin. The winners were Dead Men Walking. Spine Chiller Challenge: Create a creepy clown display and incorporate a circus peanut based sweet. The winners were Dead Men Walking. Eliminated Team: No Guts No Gory				Shinmin Li Tom Savini Shawnee Smith
2	2	Battle of the Vampire Killer	October 14, 2012	Shinmin Li Tom Savini Rutina Wesley
Small Scare Challenge: Create a personal interpretation of the Grim Reaper. The winners were Paranormal. Spine Chiller Challenge: Create a scene with a vampire verses a vampire killer and incorporate a bloody candy treat. The winners were Dead Men Walking. Eliminated Team: Screamish				Shinmin Li Tom Savini Rutina Wesley
2	3	Science Gone Wrong	October 21, 2012	Shinmin Li Tom Savini Chaske Spencer
Small Scare Challenge: Create something scary that could be lurking behind a door. The winners were Morbid Mayhem. Spine Chiller Challenge: Create a monster caused by science gone wrong and incorporate a crazy candy fit for a mad scientist. The winners were Morbid Mayhem. Eliminated Team: Paranormal				Shinmin Li Tom Savini Chaske Spencer
2	4	Zombie Wedding	October 28, 2012	Shinmin Li Tom Savini Sara Canning
Small Scare Challenge: Create a representation of claustrophobia/being trapped. The winners were Morbid Mayhem. Spine Chiller Challenge: Create a zombie wedding and incorporate an oozy, edible wedding favor. The winner of the $50,000 was Team Dead Men Walking. Eliminated Team: Morbid Mayhem				Shinmin Li Tom Savini Sara Canning

== Season 3 (2013) ==
=== Teams ===
Twisted Trio - Veronique de Groot (cake), Robert Childers (pumpkin), Heather Hurlbert (sugar)

Black Magic - Jeff Ontiveros (sugar), Sarah Ono Jones (cake), Gabriel Viñas (pumpkin)

Skeleton Crew - Jon Neill (pumpkin), Mark Lie (cake), Santosh Tiptur (sugar)

Psychotic Misfits - Brian Stevens (cake), Dave Smith (pumpkin), Teresa Shurilla (sugar)

Crypt Creepers - Sue Beatrice (pumpkin), Robert Lombardi (sugar), Benny Rivera (cake)

=== Episodes ===
Season #	Episode #	Episode Title	Original Airdate	Judges
3	1	Zombie Prom	October 6, 2013	Shinmin Li Brian Kinney Danielle Harris
Small Scare Challenge: Create a glow-in-the-dark Devil. The winners were Black Magic. Spine Chiller Challenge: Create a scene where zombies invade a prom and incorporate a confection that would appeal to the undead. The winners were Crypt Creepers. Eliminated Team: Twisted Trio				Shinmin Li Brian Kinney Danielle Harris
3	2	Twisted Nursery Rhymes	October 13, 2013	Shinmin Li Brian Kinney Tony Todd
Small Scare Challenge: Create an Ancient Greek mythological monster. The winners were Black Magic. Spine Chiller Challenge: Create a scene from a classic nursery rhyme with a gruesome twist and incorporate a children's treat with a surprise flavor. The winners were Skeleton Crew. Eliminated Team: Crypt Creepers				Shinmin Li Brian Kinney Tony Todd
3	3	Swamp Creatures Attack	October 20, 2013	Shinmin Li Brian Kinney Charlaine Harris
Small Scare Challenge: Create a technological device revolting against its owner. The winners were Psychotic Misfits. Spine Chiller Challenge: Create what lurks underneath the surface of a swamp and incorporate a gooey, swamp-like treat. The winners were Psychotic Misfits. Eliminated Team: Skeleton Crew				Shinmin Li Brian Kinney Charlaine Harris
3	4	Nightmares	October 27, 2013	Shinmin Li Brian Kinney Derek Mears
Small Scare Challenge: Create a possessed pet. The winners were Black Magic. Spine Chiller Challenge: Create something inspired by a personal nightmare and incorporate a horrifying, sweet treat. The winner of the $50,000 was Team Black Magic. Eliminated Team: Psychotic Misfits				Shinmin Li Brian Kinney Derek Mears

== Season 4 (2014) ==
=== Teams ===
Corpse Crushers - Jon Neill^{1} (pumpkin), Kyle Miller (cake), Briea Nathan (sugar)

Dead Reckoning - Jonathan Barwood (pumpkin), Mary Moy (sugar), Leigh Henderson^{2} (cake)

Sweet Nightmares - Robert Lombardi^{3} (sugar), Gonzuela Bastarache^{4} (cake), Cassie Wollen (pumpkin)

Malicious Intent - Teresa Shurilla^{5} (sugar), Danny Lane (cake), Ray Brown^{2} (pumpkin)

Spooktacular - Benny Rivera^{3} (cake), Rebecca Millican (sugar), Danny Kissel (pumpkin)

^Note 1: Jon Neill (Team Corpse Crushers) was in season 3 (Team Skeleton Crew) but lost in the 3rd episode.

^Note 2: Leigh Henderson (Team Dead Reckoning) and Ray Brown (Team Malicious Intent) worked together in season 2 (Team Paranormal) but lost in the 3rd episode.

^Note 3: Robert Lombardi (Team Sweet Nightmares) and Benny Rivera (Team Spooktacular) worked together in season 3 (Team Crypt Creepers) but lost in the 2nd episode.

^Note 4: Gonzuela Bastarache (Team Sweet Nightmares) was in season 2 (Team No Guts No Gory) but lost in the 1st episode.

^Note 5: Teresa Shurilla (Team Malicious Intent) was in season 3 (Team Psychotic Misfits) but lost in the final episode.

=== Episodes ===
Season #	Episode #	Episode Title	Original Airdate	Judges
4	1	The Haunted Farm	October 5, 2014	Shinmin Li Brian Kinney Naomi Grossman
Small Scare Challenge: Create a hungry troll. The winners were Dead Reckoning. Spine Chiller Challenge: Create a haunted farm scene and incorporate a jam-filled sweet that looks like a bug. The winners were Corpse Crushers. Eliminated Team: Malicious Intent				Shinmin Li Brian Kinney Naomi Grossman
4	2	Don't Go Into the Forest	October 12, 2014	Shinmin Li Brian Kinney Adi Shankar
Small Scare Challenge: Create a zombie child's doll. The winners were Sweet Nightmares. Spine Chiller Challenge: Create a creepy forest scene and incorporate a seemingly innocent treat. The winners were Dead Reckoning. Eliminated Team: Spooktacular Special Note: Pumpkin carver Cassie Wollen from Team Sweet Nightmares left the competition for personal reasons. She was replaced by Ray Brown from previously eliminated Team Malicious Intent.				Shinmin Li Brian Kinney Adi Shankar
4	3	Mummies vs. Werewolves	October 19, 2014	Shinmin Li Brian Kinney Francia Raisa
Small Scare Challenge: Create an evil, possessed toy. The winners were Corpse Crushers. Spine Chiller Challenge: Create a battle scene depicting mummies versus werewolves and incorporate a unique take on the classic moon pie dessert. The winners were Corpse Crushers. Eliminated Team: Dead Reckoning				Shinmin Li Brian Kinney Francia Raisa
4	4	Haunted Carnival	October 26, 2014	Shinmin Li Brian Kinney Lew Temple
Small Scare Challenge: Create an interpretation of a snake pit. The winners were Sweet Nightmares. Spine Chiller Challenge: Create a haunted carnival and incorporate a sweet treat on a stick. The winner of the $50,000 was Team Corpse Crushers. Eliminated Team: Sweet Nightmares				Shinmin Li Brian Kinney Lew Temple

== Season 5 (2015) ==
=== Teams ===
Scream Team - Adam Bierton (pumpkin), Robert Teddy (cake), Darci Rochau^{1} (sugar)

Gore Mayhem - Heidi Trelstad (cake), Rocio Varela (sugar), Dean Murray^{1} (pumpkin)

Morbid Morticians - Rebecca Wortman (sugar), Renay Zamora (cake), Doug Goodreau^{3} (pumpkin)

2 Ghouls and a Guy - Diane Fehder (cake), Jeff Munchell (sugar), Bridget McCarty (pumpkin)

Spell Binders - Joseph Yakovetic (pumpkin), Charity George^{2} (sugar), Kristen Lovulla (cake)

^Note 1: Darci Rochau (Scream Team) and Dean Murray (Team Gore Mayhem) competed together in season 2 (Team Screamish) but lost in the 2nd episode.

^Note 2: Charity George (Team Spell Binders) was also in season 2 (Team Screamish) but she competed as a cake artist and switched to sugar work this season.

^Note 3: Doug Goodreau (Team Morbid Morticians) was in season 2 (Team No Guts No Gory) but lost in the 1st episode.

=== Episodes ===
Season #	Episode #	Episode Title	Original Airdate	Judges
5	1	Infestation	October 4, 2015	Shinmin Li Brian Kinney Robin Atkin Downes
Small Scare Challenge: The teams had to make a representation of one of the seven deadly sins. (Sins chosen: Gluttony, Lust, Gluttony, Pride, & Wrath.) The winners were Scream Team. Spine Chiller Challenge: Create a scene depicting a creepy infestation and incorporate a treat with a surprising texture. The winners were Morbid Morticians. Eliminated Team: 2 Ghouls and a Guy				Shinmin Li Brian Kinney Robin Atkin Downes
5	2	Hybrid Horror	October 11, 2015	Shinmin Li Brian Kinney Benjamin Papac
Small Scare Challenge: Create a horror scenario involving a mirror. The winners were Gore Mayhem. Spine Chiller Challenge: Create a hybrid creature that is half man, half monster and incorporate a confection that combines two classic desserts into one. The winners were Scream Team. Eliminated Team: Morbid Morticians				Shinmin Li Brian Kinney Benjamin Papac
5	3	Grave Robber	October 18, 2015	Shinmin Li Brian Kinney Bex Taylor-Klaus
Small Scare Challenge: Create the Devil's child. The winners were Gore Mayhem. Spine Chiller Challenge: Create a scene where a grave robber digs up a sickening surprise and incorporate a "dirt" dessert. The winners were Scream Team. Eliminated Team: Gore Mayhem				Shinmin Li Brian Kinney Bex Taylor-Klaus
5	4	Undead Dinner Party	October 25, 2015	Shinmin Li Brian Kinney Elvira
Small Scare Challenge: Create a voodoo doll. The winners were Scream Team. Spine Chiller Challenge: Create a scene from an undead dinner party and incorporate a sweet treat for the dinner table. The winner of the $50,000 was the Scream Team. Eliminated Team: Spell Binders				Shinmin Li Brian Kinney Elvira

== Season 6 (2016) ==
=== Teams ===
Crypt Cookers - Teresa Argeris (sugar), Jason Reaves (cake), Lenny Calvin (pumpkin)

Sugar Psychos - Al DiBartolo (cake), Santosh Tiptur^{1} (sugar), James Hall (pumpkin)

Food Phantoms - Ray Brown^{2} (pumpkin), Chris Davies (sugar), Kimberly Hall (cake)

Scare Squad - Gus Smithhisler (pumpkin), Darmayne Robertson (cake), Joshua Simpson (sugar)

The Underbakers - Jewel Johnson (sugar), Erin Erler (cake), Jeremy Smith (pumpkin)

Sweet Screams - Angela Sweetser (sugar), Tersey Bolin (cake), Chad Gainey (pumpkin)

^Note 1: Santosh Tiptur (Team Sugar Psychos) was in season 3 (Team Skeleton Crew) but lost in the 3rd episode.

^Note 2: Ray Brown (Team Food Phantoms) was in season 2 and season 4 (losing in the 3rd and 4th episodes, respectively).

=== Episodes ===
Season #	Episode #	Episode Title	Original Airdate	Judges
6	1	Witches vs. Warlocks	October 2, 2016	Shinmin Li Don Mancini Elvira
Small Scare Challenge: Create the selfie from Hell. The winners were Sugar Psychos. Spine Chiller Challenge: Create a modern day scene of a witch versus a warlock and incorporate an edible "witch's brew". The winners were Sugar Psychos. Eliminated Team: Scare Squad				Shinmin Li Don Mancini Elvira
6	2	Haunted Motel	October 9, 2016	Shinmin Li Don Mancini Sid Haig
Small Scare Challenge: Create Medusa with a scary new hairdo. The winners were Food Phantoms. Spine Chiller Challenge: Create a haunted motel scene and incorporate a treat inspired by road food. The winners were Sugar Psychos. Eliminated Team: Food Phantoms				Shinmin Li Don Mancini Sid Haig
6	3	Two-Faced	October 16, 2016	Shinmin Li Don Mancini Carlson Young
Small Scare Challenge: Create a killer plant from Hell. The winners were Crypt Cookers. Spine Chiller Challenge: Create a two-faced figure with a "kind half" and an "evil half" and incorporate a dessert that looks one way but tastes another. The winners were Sugar Psychos. Eliminated Team: Sweet Screams				Shinmin Li Don Mancini Carlson Young
6	4	Mausoleum Mayhem	October 23, 2016	Shinmin Li Don Mancini Gregory Plotkin
Small Scare Challenge: Create an example of a deranged doctor. The winners were Crypt Cookers. Spine Chiller Challenge: Create what would happen to someone trapped in a mausoleum and incorporate some "finger" foods. The winners were Sugar Psychos. Eliminated Team: Crypt Cookers				Shinmin Li Don Mancini Gregory Plotkin
6	5	Demonic Wedding	October 30, 2016	Shinmin Li Don Mancini Bitsie Tulloch
Small Scare Challenge: Create a massive bug fight. The winners were The Underbakers. Spine Chiller Challenge: Create a demonic scene with a bride and groom and incorporate a miniature wedding cake. The winner of the $50,000 was Team Sugar Psychos. Eliminated Team: The Underbakers				Shinmin Li Don Mancini Bitsie Tulloch

== Season 7 (2017) ==
=== Teams ===
Morbid Masterminds - Mike Elder (cake), Shannon Gerasimchik (pumpkin), Charity George^{1} (sugar)

Sugar Slashers - Brian "Tator" Edwards (pumpkin), Johanna Wyss (cake), Michelle Boyd (sugar)

Scare Snactics - Briea Nathan^{2} (sugar), Sam Slade (cake), Mike Craghead (pumpkin)

Team Ghoul'd - Liz Marek (cake), Mike Brown (pumpkin), Christophe Rull (sugar)

Ghoulish Gang - Nancy Baker (pumpkin), Rachael Morris (cake), Nils Rowland (sugar)

Spooky Boo's - Vivian Pham (cake), Danielle DeJesus (pumpkin), Kara Andretta (sugar)

^Note 1: Charity George (Team Morbid Masterminds) was in season 2 and season 5 (losing in the 2nd and 4th episodes, respectively).

^Note 2: Briea Nathan (Team Scare Snactics) was part of the winning team in season 4 (Team Corpse Crushers).

=== Episodes ===
Season #	Episode #	Episode Title	Original Airdate	Judges
7	1	The Hitchhiker's Worst Nightmare	October 1, 2017	Shinmin Li Todd Tucker Shane West
Small Scare Challenge: Create a monster with a hot new makeover. The winners were Morbid Masterminds. Spine Chiller Challenge: Create a scene depicting what happens when hitchhiking goes wrong and incorporate a coffee/espresso themed dessert. The winners were Sugar Slashers. Eliminated Team: Ghoulish Gang				Shinmin Li Todd Tucker Shane West
7	2	Secret Creature Reveal	October 8, 2017	Shinmin Li Todd Tucker Robert Patrick
Small Scare Challenge: Create a mummy on a day out. The winners were Morbid Masterminds. Spine Chiller Challenge: Create a scene where a regular person reveals themselves to be a creepy creature and incorporate a treat that blends two desserts into one tasty treat. The winners were Morbid Masterminds. Eliminated Team: Spooky Boo's				Shinmin Li Todd Tucker Robert Patrick
7	3	Monster Party	October 15, 2017	Shinmin Li Todd Tucker Juliet Landau
Small Scare Challenge: : Create a baby monster. The winners were Team Ghoul'd. Spine Chiller Challenge: Create a monster party scene with werewolves, vampires, and/or zombies. Incorporate a drink inspired treat to the displays. The winners were Team Ghoul'd. Eliminated Team: Sugar Slashers				Shinmin Li Todd Tucker Juliet Landau
7	4	Zombie Cooking Show	October 22, 2017	Shinmin Li Todd Tucker Bryan Fuller
Small Scare Challenge: Create a modernized version of the devil. The winners were Team Ghoul'd. Spine Chiller Challenge: Create an undead ghoul hosting a zombie cooking show and include any dessert of their choice with an edible plate. The winners were Team Ghoul'd. Eliminated Team: Scare Snactics				Shinmin Li Todd Tucker Bryan Fuller
7	5	Beware	October 29, 2017	Shinmin Li Todd Tucker Fiona Dourif
Small Scare Challenge: Create a haunted ventriloquist. The winners were Team Ghoul'd. Spine Chiller Challenge: Create a scene depicting the final seconds before a danger (anything the team chooses) strikes and incorporate a treat with a shocking flavor twist. The winner of the $50,000 was Team Ghoul'd. Eliminated Team: Morbid Masterminds				Shinmin Li Todd Tucker Fiona Dourif

== Hayride of Horror ==
Augmenting the main series, a special Hayride of Horror competition aired in 2017, featuring custom displays for an outdoor trail, where dozens of hayriders choose the winner. Two teams compete head-to-head across all three episodes, with a prize of $15,000 per episode. Harley Morenstein serves as the host, with pastry chef Zac Young and SFX makeup artist Bianca Appice as judges.

Each five-person team has three pumpkin carvers, a cake artist, and a sugar artist. In the "First Shock" round, teams make smaller pieces to win the advantage of first pick of the pumpkin patch. For the "Final Fright" main challenge, both teams get two assistants. Working outside at an actual farm, teams also create thematic tasting elements to entice the hayriders.

=== Teams ===
Deadly Intentions: Adam Bierton^{1} (pumpkin), Reva Alexander-Hawk (sugar), Stephan Baity (pumpkin), Monique Hawk (pumpkin), Mark Lie^{2} (cake)

Scream Seekers: Danny Kissel^{3} (pumpkin), Fred "Froggy" Isla (sugar), Jewel Burgess (cake), Dave Smith^{4} (pumpkin), Frank Reaver (pumpkin)

^Note 1: Adam Bierton (Team Deadly Intentions) was part of the winning team on Halloween Wars season 5 (Scream Team).

^Note 2: Mark Lie (Team Deadly Intentions) was on Halloween Wars Season 3 (Team Skeleton Crew) but lost in the 3rd episode.

^Note 3: Danny Kissel (Team Scream Seekers) was on Halloween Wars Season 4 (Team Spooktacular) but lost in the 2nd episode.

^Note 4: Dave Smith (Team Scream Seekers) was on Halloween Wars Season 3 (Team Psychotic Misfits) but lost in the final episode.

=== Episodes ===
Season #	Episode #	Episode Title	Original Airdate	Judges
7	1	The Scarecrow Comes Alive!	October 2, 2017	Zac Young Bianca Appice
First Shock: Combine caramel and cinnamon into a scary dessert. Pumpkin carvers are only allowed to carve yams in this round. Winners of the first round are Team Deadly Intentions. Final Fright: Create a scene depicting what might happen when the scarecrows rise up and attack. They also need to incorporate a treat for the hay riders and judges. Winners of $15,000: Scream Seekers				Zac Young Bianca Appice
7	2	When Pumpkins Fight Back	October 9, 2017	Zac Young Bianca Appice
First Shock: Combine pumpkin and chocolate into a scary dessert display. Winners of the first round are Team Scream Seekers. Final Fright: Create a scene depicting what might happen if pumpkins come alive and strike back. They also need to incorporate a treat for the hay riders and judges. Winners of $15,000: Deadly Intentions				Zac Young Bianca Appice
7	3	Possessed Zoo	October 16, 2017	Zac Young Bianca Appice
First Shock: Combine cranberries and apples into a scary dessert display. Winners of the first round are Team Deadly Intentions. Final Fright: Create a scene depicting a daring escape from an evil, possessed zoo. They also need to incorporate a treat for the hay riders and judges. Winners of $15,000: Scream Seekers (They won a total of $30,000.)				Zac Young Bianca Appice

== Season 8 (2018) ==
=== Teams ===
Grave Expectations - Elizabeth Rowe (cake), Jewel Johnson^{1} (sugar), Clive Cooper (pumpkin)

Tricked-Out-Treats - Brandy Davis (pumpkin), Ernest Strickland (cake), Teresa Shurilla^{5} (sugar)

Monsters of Mayhem - Jeff Brown (pumpkin), Sabrina Jurado (cake), Cesar Barachina (sugar)

Zesty Zombies - Kimberly Hall^{2} (cake), Lenny Calvin^{3} (pumpkin), Shelby Bower (sugar)

Candied Cadavers - Cynthia White (cake), Orly Yadao (sugar), Arlen Pelletier (pumpkin)

Beastly Banshees - Corinna MacGuire (cake), Tom Lindskog (pumpkin), Joshua Simpson^{4} (sugar)

^Note 1: Jewel Johnson (Team Grave Expectations) was in season 6 (Team The Underbakers) but lost in the final episode.

^Note 2: Kimberly Hall (Team Zesty Zombies) was also in season 6 (Team Food Phantoms) but lost in the 2nd episode.

^Note 3: Lenny Calvin (Team Zesty Zombies) was also in season 6 (Team Crypt Cookers) but lost in the 4th episode.

^Note 4: Joshua Simpson (Team Beastly Banshees) was also in season 6 (Team Scare Squad) but lost in the 1st episode.

^Note 5: Teresa Shurilla (Team Tricked-Out-Treats) was in season 3 and season 4 (losing in the final and 1st episodes, respectively).

=== Episodes ===
Season #	Episode #	Episode Title	Original Airdate	Judges
8	1	The Boogeyman's Nightmare	September 30, 2018	Shinmin Li Todd Tucker Sean Gunn
Small Scare Challenge: Create a scenario where candy bites back. The winners were Candied Cadavers. Spine Chiller Challenge: Create a creature that would haunt the boogeyman's nightmares and incorporate a tasty midnight snack. The winners were Candied Cadavers. Eliminated Team: Tricked-Out-Treats				Shinmin Li Todd Tucker Sean Gunn
8	2	Clowns vs. Zombies	October 7, 2018	Shinmin Li Todd Tucker John Kassir
Small Scare Challenge: Create a gift that Frankenstein's monster would give his bride. The winners were Zesty Zombies. Spine Chiller Challenge: Create a scene depicting a clown verses a zombie and incorporate a sweet treat that a clown or zombie would love. The winners were Zesty Zombies. Eliminated Team: Beastly Banshees				Shinmin Li Todd Tucker John Kassir
8	3	Witch Gets a New Ride	October 14, 2018	Shinmin Li Todd Tucker Mick Garris
Small Scare Challenge: Create a monstrous animal mutation. The winners were Zesty Zombies. Spine Chiller Challenge: Create a new method of transportation for a witch, replacing the broom, and incorporate an edible "witch's brew". The winners were Monsters of Mayhem. Eliminated Team: Grave Expectations				Shinmin Li Todd Tucker Mick Garris
8	4	Halloween Time Travel	October 21, 2018	Shinmin Li Todd Tucker Gaten Matarazzo
Small Scare Challenge: Create a new spin on Pandora's Box. The winners were Candied Cadavers. Spine Chiller Challenge: Create a scene depicting Halloween from any period in time and incorporate a sweet treat that would fit into the era being depicted. The winners were Candied Cadavers. Eliminated Team: Monsters of Mayhem				Shinmin Li Todd Tucker Gaten Matarazzo
8	5	Outbreak!	October 28, 2018	Shinmin Li Todd Tucker LeeAnna Vamp
Small Scare Challenge: Create a demon's prized possession. The winners were Candied Cadavers. Spine Chiller Challenge: Create a scene depicting a terrifying outbreak and incorporate a delicious "antidote" dessert. The winner of the $50,000 was Team Candied Cadavers. Eliminated Team: Zesty Zombies				Shinmin Li Todd Tucker LeeAnna Vamp

== Season 9 (2019) ==
=== Teams ===
Trio of Terror - Brian "Tator" Edwards^{1} (pumpkin), Kristen Eagles (cake), Fred "Froggy" Isla^{6} (sugar)

Hangry Haunters - Jarid Altmark (cake), Rebecca Millican^{2} (sugar), Mike Brown^{3} (pumpkin)

Malicious Mavens - Lisa Barker (pumpkin), Haley Popp (cake), Kelsee Newman (sugar)

Burned at the Cake - Brenda Villacorta (cake), Julian Jimenez (sugar), Chris Larsen (pumpkin)

Buttercream Beasts - Beth Townsend (cake), Matt Harper (pumpkin), Angela Sweetser^{4} (sugar)

Frosted Freakshow - Christine Leaming (cake), James Hall^{5} (pumpkin), Reva Alexander-Hawk^{7} (sugar)

^Note 1: Brian "Tator" Edwards (Team Trio of Terror) was in season 7 (Team Sugar Slashers) but lost in the 3rd episode.

^Note 2: Rebecca Millican (Team Hangry Haunters) was in season 4 (Team Spooktacular) but lost in the 2nd episode.

^Note 3: Mike Brown (Team Hangry Haunters) was part of the winning team in season 7 (Team Team Ghoul'd).

^Note 4: Angela Sweetser (Team Buttercream Beasts) was in season 6 (Team Sweet Screams) but lost in the 3rd episode.

^Note 5: James Hall (Team Frosted Freakshow) was part of the winning team in season 6 (Team Sugar Psychos).

^Note 6: Fred "Froggy" Isla (Team Trio of Terror) was part of the twice-winning team on Halloween Wars: Hayride of Horror (Team Scream Seekers).

^Note 7: Reva Alexander-Hawk (Team Frosted Freakshow) was part of the team with a single win on Halloween Wars: Hayride of Horror (Team Deadly Intentions).

=== Episodes ===
Season #	Episode #	Episode Title	Original Airdate	Judges
9	1	Trapped in a Nightmare	September 29, 2019	Shinmin Li Todd Tucker Elvira
Small Scare Challenge: Create a stuffed animal's evil twin. The winners were Malicious Mavens. Spine Chiller Challenge: Create a trapped-in-a-nightmare scenario and incorporate a chamomile treat. The winners were Burned at the Cake. Eliminated Team: Hangry Haunters				Shinmin Li Todd Tucker Elvira
9	2	Zombie Dating Show	October 6, 2019	Shinmin Li Todd Tucker Colman Domingo
Small Scare Challenge: Create a haunted museum exhibit. The winners were Frosted Freakshow. Spine Chiller Challenge: Create a zombie dating show and incorporate a brain-themed treat. The winners were Buttercream Beasts. Eliminated Team: Malicious Mavens Special Note: Sugar artist Angela Sweetser from Team Buttercream Beasts left the competition in the previous episode due to illness. She was replaced by Rebecca Millican from previously eliminated Team Hangry Haunters.				Shinmin Li Todd Tucker Colman Domingo
9	3	The Swarm	October 13, 2019	Shinmin Li Todd Tucker Harley Quinn Smith
Small Scare Challenge: Create a dinner's revenge scenario, where the food makes a meal out of the humans. The winners were Frosted Freakshow. Spine Chiller Challenge: Create a swarm of monsters that are attacking humans, with some of the monsters as the tasting element. The winners were Buttercream Beasts. Eliminated Team: Burned at the Cake				Shinmin Li Todd Tucker Harley Quinn Smith
9	4	Other Holiday Mascots Go Trick-or-Treating	October 20, 2019	Shinmin Li Todd Tucker Jackson Rathbone
Small Scare Challenge: Create a vampire makeover. The winners were Trio of Terror. Spine Chiller Challenge: Create a trick-or-treating scene of a non-Halloween mascot, with a treat from that mascot's holiday. The winners were Buttercream Beasts. Eliminated Team: Trio of Terror				Shinmin Li Todd Tucker Jackson Rathbone
9	5	Scary Tales II	October 27, 2019	Shinmin Li Todd Tucker Caleb McLaughlin
Small Scare Challenge: Create a scenario where "idle hands" turn against their owner. The winners were Frosted Freakshow. Spine Chiller Challenge: Choose a classic fairy tale (The Three Little Pigs, Goldilocks and the Three Bears, Thumbelina or Rapunzel), create a creepy version of it, and incorporate a unique version of milk and cookies. (Fairy tales chosen: Goldilocks and the Three Bears & Thumbelina.) The winner of the $50,000 was Team Frosted Freakshow. Eliminated Team: Buttercream Beasts				Shinmin Li Todd Tucker Caleb McLaughlin

== Season 10 (2020) ==
=== Teams ===
Candy Coroners - Amy McBride (cake), Chad Gainey^{1} (pumpkin), Janet Barron (sugar)

Ghoulicious - Heather Sherman (cake), Deane Arnold (pumpkin), Cesar Barachina^{2} (sugar)

Mummies' Rejects - Daniel Miller (pumpkin), Hemu Basu (cake), Steve Weiss (sugar)

Ghouly Goblins - Stephan Baity^{3} (pumpkin), Sam Lucero (cake), Sharon Hauht (sugar)

Crave Diggers - Jeff Taylor (cake), Eric Jones (pumpkin), Joel Gonzalez (sugar)

Killer Cakerz - Carmel Turner (cake), Vanessa Greeley (sugar), Jim Bille (pumpkin)

^Note 1: Chad Gainey (Team Candy Coroners) was in season 6 (Team Sweet Screams) but lost in the 3rd episode.

^Note 2: Cesar Barachina (Team Ghoulicious) was in Season 8 (Team Monsters of Mayhem) but lost in the 4th episode.

^Note 3: Stephan Baity (Team Ghouly Goblins) was part of the team with a single win on Halloween Wars: Hayride of Horror (Team Deadly Intentions).

=== Episodes ===
Season #	Episode #	Episode Title	Original Airdate	Judges
10	1	Monster Road Trip	September 13, 2020	Shinmin Li Todd Tucker Jeremy Ray Taylor
Small Scare Challenge: Create a scenario of what horror awaits someone in a pumpkin patch. The winners were Candy Coroners. Spine Chiller Challenge: Create a scene depicting monsters on a road trip and incorporate a coffee-infused treat. The winners were Crave Diggers. Eliminated Team: Ghouly Goblins				Shinmin Li Todd Tucker Jeremy Ray Taylor
10	2	Blind Date From Hell	September 20, 2020	Shinmin Li Todd Tucker Guillermo Díaz
Small Scare Challenge: Create an example of a fortune teller that foretells a terrifying future. The winners were Mummies' Rejects. Spine Chiller Challenge: Create a scene depicting someone on a blind date from Hell and incorporate a treat with the flavors of red wine and dark chocolate. The winners were Crave Diggers. Eliminated Team: Killer Cakerz				Shinmin Li Todd Tucker Guillermo Díaz
10	3	Monster Support Group	September 27, 2020	Shinmin Li Todd Tucker Katie Sarife
Small Scare Challenge: Create a mad scientist's new pet. The winners were Crave Diggers. Spine Chiller Challenge: Create a scene depicting the beastly bond of a monster support group and incorporate a delicious doughnut. The winners were Mummies' Rejects. Eliminated Team: Ghoulicious				Shinmin Li Todd Tucker Katie Sarife
10	4	Trapped with a Monster	October 4, 2020	Shinmin Li Todd Tucker Jocelin Donahue
Small Scare Challenge: Each team must create a spooky self-portrait of themselves. The winners were Candy Coroners. Spine Chiller Challenge: Create a scene depicting the terrifying results of when someone is trapped with a monster and incorporate a sticky, gooey treat. The winners were Mummies' Rejects. Eliminated Team: Candy Coroners				Shinmin Li Todd Tucker Jocelin Donahue
10	5	Look Out!	October 11, 2020	Shinmin Li Todd Tucker Marisol Nichols
Small Scare Challenge: Create a representation of a giant bug attack. The winners were Crave Diggers. Spine Chiller Challenge: Create a horror movie scene that depicts a jump scare, include a mechanical trick, and incorporate a treat with a surprise pop of flavor inside. The winner of the $50,000 was Team Mummies' Rejects. Eliminated Team: Crave Diggers				Shinmin Li Todd Tucker Marisol Nichols
