= Eddie Jackson (chef) =

American football player and chef (born 1980)

- Born: Eddie Paul Jackson Jr. December 19, 1980 (age 45); Americus, Georgia, U.S.
- Education: University of Arkansas
- Spouse: Melissa Morris
- Children: 2
- Culinary career
- Television shows
- BBQ Blitz; BBQ Brawl, season 2; The Big Bake; Christmas Cookie Challenge; Kids BBQ Championship; Ultimate Summer Cook-Off; Yum and Yummer; Outchef’d; Halloween Wars judge, seasons 11 & 12
- Football career

No. 34, 35, 20, 29
- Position: Cornerback

Personal information
- Listed height: 6 ft 0 in (1.83 m)
- Listed weight: 200 lb (91 kg)

Career information
- College: Arkansas
- NFL draft: 2004: undrafted

Career history
- Carolina Panthers (2004); Miami Dolphins (2005–2006); New England Patriots (2007); Washington Redskins (2008)*
- * Offseason or practice squad member only

Career NFL statistics
- Total tackles: 40
- Fumble recoveries: 2
- Pass deflections: 5
- Stats at Pro Football Reference

Eddie Paul Jackson Jr. (born December 19, 1980) is an American chef and former football cornerback. He was signed by the Carolina Panthers as an undrafted free agent in 2004. He played college football for Arkansas. He is a member of the Phi Beta Sigma fraternity.

Jackson was also a member of the Miami Dolphins, New England Patriots and Washington Redskins.

== College career ==
In college, Jackson started 21 of 47 games at both the cornerback and strong safety slots for the Arkansas Razorbacks and totaled 174 tackles, 35 passes defensed, one forced fumble, and two fumble recoveries. He also ran the high hurdles for the national champion Razorback track team. Jackson was also a College All-American in Track and Field where he won four national titles. He still holds the freshman record for the 110 high hurdles.

== Professional career ==
=== Carolina Panthers ===
Jackson was signed as an undrafted free agent by the Carolina Panthers in 2004.

=== Miami Dolphins ===
He spent the 2005 and 2006 seasons with the Miami Dolphins, and ended his last year on injured reserve with a torn anterior cruciate ligament suffered in a December 25 contest.

Due in part to his injury, Jackson was not tendered a contract by the Dolphins as a restricted free agent.

=== New England Patriots ===
On March 19, 2007, Jackson signed a two-year deal with the New England Patriots. The contract contained no signing bonus, and base salaries of $1,510,000 in 2007 and $1,605,000 in 2008. He was released by the Patriots during the 2007 season.

=== Washington Redskins ===
Jackson was signed by the Washington Redskins during the 2008 offseason, but was released on June 5.

== MasterChef and Food Network ==
After retiring from football, Jackson became a personal trainer, as well as owning a food truck, Caribbean Grill, in Houston. Cooking had been a lifelong passion of his.

Jackson first gained culinary notoriety as he competed on Season 4 of the reality cooking competition show MasterChef in 2013, finishing in eighth place.

Jackson then competed on Season 11 of the Food Network series Food Network Star in 2015, and won the season, beating out eleven other contestants.

As a reward for winning Food Network Star, Jackson got his own Food Network cooking competition series, BBQ Blitz, in which contestants competed to create the best barbecue dish; Jackson served as the host. The show ran for six episodes in late 2015. Since 2016 he has hosted the Food Network cooking competition series Kids BBQ Championship. For the first season in 2016 his co-host was model Camila Alves, while for the 2nd season in 2017 his co-host was fellow Food Network Star (season 9) winner Damaris Phillips. He also infrequently served as a judge on Clash of the Grandmas. Jackson is the current host of Christmas Cookie Challenge on Food Network, as well as one of the judges. Jackson has also appeared on Chopped as a judge. In 2021, he was a team captain of BBQ Brawl competing against Bobby Flay and Michael Symon. Jackson also served as a judge on seasons 11 and 12 of Halloween Wars as well as Guy's Grocery Games throughout its run on the network.

He is currently the host of Outchef’d on Food Network as well as the host of Christmas Cookie Challenge with Ree Drummond. He also serves as a judge on Supermarket Stakeout.
