= Southern at Heart =

- Also known as: Southern at Heart with Damaris Phillips
- Genre: Cooking show; Food reality television
- Starring: Damaris Phillips
- Country of origin: United States
- Original language: English
- No. of seasons: 5
- No. of episodes: 53

Production
- Producer: Triage Entertainment
- Production locations: Louisville, Kentucky, United States
- Running time: 22:00

Original release
- Network: Food Network
- Release: October 27, 2013 – February 28, 2016

Southern at Heart with Damaris Phillips, commonly known by its shortened title Southern at Heart, is an American cooking-themed series that aired on Food Network. The series was presented by chef Damaris Phillips, who came to prominence as the winner of the ninth season of the Food Network series Food Network Star.

A short pilot episode for the series aired while Phillips was a contestant on Food Network Star, under the working title Eat, Date, Love; and it originally had Phillips teaching a different male guest how to cook for his respective partner. This theme continued when the series officially began on October 27, 2013; but by the second season, it had been dropped and the series had transitioned into a more traditional cooking series.

The series' fifth and final season premiered on October 4, 2015, and concluded on February 28, 2016.
