= $24 in 24 =

- Genre: Reality series
- Presented by: Jeff Mauro
- Country of origin: United States
- Original language: English
- No. of seasons: 1
- No. of episodes: 7

Production
- Production company: Custom Productions

Original release
- Network: Food Network
- Release: September 23 – October 29, 2012

$24 in 24 is a reality television series that was broadcast on the Food Network, which premiered on September 23, 2012. The show was hosted by Jeff Mauro. In each episode, Mauro went on a trip to a different city in the United States with only $24 to spend on breakfast, lunch, and dinner.

== Episode Guide ==
No.	Title	Air date
1	"Chicago"	September 23, 2012
2	"Cleveland"	September 24, 2012
3	"Los Angeles"	October 1, 2012
4	"Minneapolis"	October 8, 2012
5	"Boston"	October 15, 2012
6	"New York City"	October 22, 2012
7	"Philadelphia"	October 29, 2012
