= Ray Villafane =

American sculpture artist

- Born: March 5, 1969 (age 57); Queens, New York, U.S.
- Occupation: Sculpture artist
- Spouse: Tammi Schmidt (m. 2003)
- Website: villafanestudios.com

Ray Anthony Villafane (born c. 1968) is an American sculpture artist. Villafane was an art teacher for 12 years in Bellaire, Michigan, before becoming a full-time sculptor in 2006. He gained national attention in 2007 when he competed on and won Food Network’s Challenge Show segment “Outrageous Pumpkins”.

== Early life and education ==
Ray Anthony Villafane was born in Queens, New York, and was raised on Long Island. He graduated from the School of Visual Arts in New York City in 1991.

== Career ==
Villafane worked as a K-12 art teacher in Bellaire, Michigan, for 12 years. He began to carve pumpkins when one of his students brought a pumpkin to class and asked him to carve it.

He began working part time in 2003 as a sculptor in addition to teaching. After creating a wax sculpture of the Marvel character Wolverine and posting an image of it online, he was contacted by a company selling products licensed by Marvel; they offered to produce his work. He resigned from teaching in 2006 to pursue a full-time sculpting career.

In 2007, Villafane was contacted by Food Network and asked to appear on Food Network's Challenge Show for a segment called "Outrageous Pumpkins". He competed against three other professional pumpkin sculptors and won each of the three rounds, winning the grand prize. It received the highest ratings of any Food Network Challenge. In 2009, he was invited back to Outrageous Pumpkins and won the show a second time.

In September 2010, Villafane competed in the World Championship of Sandsculpting in Federal Way, Washington, placing third in the doubles category alongside his partner John Gowdy.

In 2011, while attending a display at the New York Botanical Garden, he carved the world's biggest pumpkin to resemble a zombie apocalypse scene. He also carved pumpkins for Heidi Klum's annual Halloween party in Las Vegas in 2011. Villafane participated in the Food Network mini-series Halloween Wars that aired in October 2011.

== Personal life ==
Villafane married Tammi Schmidt in 2003. They have a blended family of six children. Villafane also has two known siblings. Full brother and Content Creator, Andrew Villafane. Half sister and Photographer, Kendra Hull.

He is allergic to pumpkins.
