= Lenny McNab =

American chef

- Born: 1971 or 1972 (age 54–55); Bristol, New Hampshire, United States
- Culinary career
- Cooking style: Chuckwagon cooking

Lenny McNab is an American chef who is best known as the winner of the tenth season of the Food Network television series Food Network Star. He defeated runner-up Luca Della Casa on August 10, 2014. Food Network executive Bob Tuschman said that "Lenny's magnetic personality, culinary chops and cowboy swagger made him stand out in this very talented crowd from the beginning."

McNab wears cowboy attire and specializes in "elevated chuck wagon fare". A native of New Hampshire, McNab got his culinary training in Bad Kissingen, Germany. He is a former executive head chef at the Kessler Canyon hunting lodge in De Beque, Colorado.

In 2013, McNab participated in "The Ol' Switcheroo" episode of Guy's Grocery Games, losing in the final. He also performs as a country singer under the name The Black Mamba.

== Controversy ==
Although McNab was declared the winner of the tenth season of Food Network Star, a series for him never materialized. Days after he was crowned the winner, news outlets reported blog posts featuring racist, homophobic and misogynistic comments made by him, with several comments targeted at fellow Food Network chef Ree Drummond.
