= Food Network Star season 10 =

Food Network Star
- Season 10
- No. of contestants: 12
- Winner: Lenny McNab

Release
- Original network: Food Network
- Original release: June 1 – August 10, 2014

Season chronology
- ← Previous; Season 9 Next → Season 11

The tenth season of the American reality television series Food Network Star premiered June 1, 2014 on Food Network.

Season 10 continued the season 8 concept of having Bobby Flay, Giada De Laurentiis and Alton Brown mentor the contestants, as well as the Star Salvation web series from season 9. Star Salvation was hosted by season 9 winner Damaris Phillips and Iron Chef Geoffrey Zakarian. In addition to eliminated contestants from this season, Chad Rosenthal (season 9) and Martie Duncan (season 8) competed in Star Salvation.

== Contestants ==
=== Winner ===
- Lenny McNab - De Beque, Colorado

=== Runners-up ===
- Luca Della Casa - San Antonio, Texas
- Nicole Gaffney - Atlantic City, New Jersey

=== Eliminated ===
(In order of elimination)

- Donna Sonkin Shaw - New York City, New York
- ~~Luca Della Casa - San Antonio, Texas~~ (Returned to the competition after winning "Star Salvation")
- Kenny Lao - New York, New York
- Aryen Moore-Alston - Memphis, Tennessee
- Christopher Lynch - New Orleans, Louisiana
- Reuben Ruiz - Miami, Florida
- Chris Kyler- Stafford, Virginia
- Emma Frisch - Ithaca, New York
- Loreal Gavin - Indianapolis, Indiana
- Sarah Penrod - League City, Texas

== Contestant progress ==
Contestant	1	2	3	4	5	6	7	8	9	10	11
Lenny	HIGH	HIGH	LOW	LOW	HIGH	IN	HIGH	LOW	HIGH	IN	WINNER
Luca	IN	OUT					IN	WIN	HIGH	IN	RUNNER-UP
Nicole	HIGH	IN	IN	WIN	IN	LOW	IN	WIN	LOW^{1}	IN	RUNNER-UP^{2}
Sarah	LOW	IN	IN	IN	IN	IN	LOW	WIN	LOW	OUT	
Loreal	HIGH	IN	LOW	IN	HIGH	HIGH	IN	LOW	OUT		
Emma	LOW	IN	WIN	WIN	IN	LOW	LOW	OUT			
Chris	IN	LOW	LOW	IN	IN	HIGH	OUT				
Reuben	IN	IN	IN	WIN	LOW	OUT					
Christopher	IN	IN	WIN	LOW	OUT						
Aryen	IN	IN	IN	OUT							
Kenny	IN	LOW	OUT								
Donna	OUT										

^Note 1 : Nicole won the mini-challenge but was in the bottom three for the main challenge.
^Note 2 : Nicole was eliminated from the final three midway through the finale.

(WINNER) The contestant won the competition and became the next "Food Network Star".
(RUNNER-UP) The contestant made it to the finale, but did not win.
(WIN) The contestant won the challenge for that week.
(RETURNED) The contestant won Star Salvation and returned to the main competition.
(HIGH) The contestant was one of the Selection Committee's favorites for that week.
(IN) The contestant was not one of the Selection Committee's favorites nor their least favorites. They were not up for elimination.
(LOW) The contestant was one of the Selection Committee's three or four least favorites for that week, but was not eliminated.
(LOW) The contestant was one of the Selection Committee's two least favorites for that week, but was not eliminated.
(OUT) The contestant was the Selection Committee's least favorite for that week, and was eliminated.

== Star Salvation ==
Following the success of Season 9, Star Salvation returned for a second season. Hosted this time by Geoffrey Zakarian and season 9 champion Damaris Phillips, each episode features the most recently eliminated contestant competing against the remaining previously eliminated contestants for a second chance at winning. In addition, this season included Season 8 Fan Favorite Martie Duncan and Season 9 Fan Favorite Chad Rosenthal competing alongside the eliminated chefs.

Contestant	1	2	3	4	5	6
Luca		IN	IN	IN	IN	WIN
Reuben						OUT
Chad	IN	IN	IN	IN	IN	OUT
Christopher					OUT	
Aryen				OUT		
Kenny			OUT			
Martie	IN	OUT				
Donna	OUT					

(WIN) The chef won Star Salvation and returned to the main competition.
(IN) The chef continued in the competition.
(OUT) The chef lost in that week's Star Salvation and was eliminated from the competition.

=== Episode 1 ===
- Advanced: Chad and Martie
- Eliminated: Donna

=== Episode 2 ===
- Advanced: Chad and Luca
- Eliminated: Martie

=== Episode 3 ===
- Advanced: Chad and Luca
- Eliminated: Kenny

=== Episode 4 ===
- Advanced: Chad and Luca
- Eliminated: Aryen

=== Episode 5 ===
- Advanced: Chad and Luca
- Eliminated: Christopher

=== Episode 6 ===
- Advanced: Luca
- Eliminated, Round 2: Reuben
- Eliminated, Round 1: Chad

== Episodes ==
=== Episode 1: Hollywood Calling! ===
- High: Lenny, Loreal and Nicole
- Low: Emma, Sarah and Donna
- Out: Donna

Original Air Date: May 31, 2014

=== Episode 2: Please Try This at Home ===
- High: Lenny
- Low: Kenny, Chris and Luca
- Out: Luca

Original Air Date: June 7, 2014

=== Episode 3: Cutthroat Food Star ===
- Winner of Heat 1: Christopher
- Winner of Heat 2: Emma
- Low: Lenny, Chris, Loreal and Kenny
- Out: Kenny

Original Air Date: June 14, 2014

=== Episode 4: Internet Marketing Video ===
- Winners: Emma, Nicole and Reuben
- Low: Lenny, Christopher and Aryen
- Out: Aryen

Original Air Date: June 21, 2014

=== Episode 5: Live Demo at Knott's Berry Farm ===
- High: Lenny and Loreal
- Low: Reuben and Christopher
- Out: Christopher

Original Air Date: June 28, 2014

=== Episode 6: Product Commercial ===
- High: Loreal and Chris
- Low: Emma, Nicole and Reuben
- Out: Reuben

Original Air Date: July 5, 2014

=== Episode 7: Vegas Pool Party ===
- Returned: Luca
- High: Lenny
- Low: Emma, Sarah and Chris
- Out: Chris

Original Air Date: July 12, 2014

=== Episode 8: One-of-a-Kind Experience ===
- Winners: Sarah, Luca and Nicole
- Low: Lenny, Loreal and Emma
- Out: Emma

Original Air Date: July 19, 2014

=== Episode 9: Rachael Ray Show ===
- High: Luca and Lenny
- Low: Nicole, Sarah and Loreal
- Out: Loreal

Original Air Date: July 26, 2014

=== Episode 10: Promos and Pilots ===
- Advanced: Luca, Nicole, and Lenny
- Out: Sarah

Original Air Date: August 2, 2014

=== Episode 11: A Food Star is Born ===
- Runners-up: Nicole Gaffney and Luca Della Casa
- The Next Food Network Star: Lenny McNab
- Show on Food Network: Cowboy Up

Original Air Date: August 9, 2014
