= Liz Marek =

American artist

- Education: Oregon Culinary Institute
- Occupation: Cake Decorating Instructor
- Known for: Producing sculpted cakes and creative wedding cake designs, Founder of Artisan Cake Company
- Website: https://sugargeekshow.com/

Liz Janean Marek (born October 26, 1980) is an American cake decorator and teacher known for her elaborate sculpted cakes. She is the founder of Artisan Cake Company based in Portland, Oregon and online cake decorating school "Sugar Geek Show".

== Career ==
Marek majored in graphic design at Linn–Benton Community College. Exploring other creative fields, she began cake decorating as a hobby in 2007. She completed a certificate at Oregon Culinary Institute, then launched the Artisan Cake Company in Portland in 2009.

Marek has participated in several cake making shows and food network competitions across the US and beyond. She has been featured in various editions of American Cake Decorators Magazine, Cake Masters Magazine USA, Cake Central Magazine, and similar publications.

Marek published Artisan Cake Company's Visual Guide to Cake Decorating in 2014. She then closed her public bakery to focus on teaching. Marek opened the online school Sugar Geek Show in 2015, where she teaches new techniques for cake production and decoration.

As a contestant on the Netflix competition series Is It Cake?, she won her first episode in 2023. Marek returned in 2025 for Is It Cake? Holiday, winning the grand prize for a hyper-realistic Santa.

As part of Team Ghoul'd, Marek has twice won Halloween Wars, first in 2017 (season 7) and again in 2026 (season 16).

== Awards and honors ==
- 2017 - Top 10 Cake Artists by Cake Masters Magazine USA
- 2018 - Nominated to represent the US in the 2019 World Cake Designers Championship

== Personal life ==
Liz has two children. She divorced Dan Marek in September 2025.
