= BBQ Blitz =

- Genre: Food reality television
- Based on: BBQ Championship
- Presented by: Eddie Jackson
- Country of origin: United States
- Original language: English
- No. of seasons: 1
- No. of episodes: 6

Production
- Producer: Gen11 Studios
- Running time: 22:00

Original release
- Network: Food Network
- Release: October 9, 2015 – present

BBQ Blitz is an American cooking reality competition that airs on Food Network. It is presented by chef and former American football player Eddie Jackson, who had most recently come to prominence as the winner of the eleventh season of the Food Network series Food Network Star. The series features Jackson traveling to different locations within the United States and overseeing a cooking competition between three participants, with the winner receiving a prize of $5,000 as well as "BBQ bragging rights".

BBQ Blitz premiered on October 9, 2015.
