= Yum and Yummer =

American food reality television series

- Also known as: & YYumummer
- Genre: Food reality television
- Presented by: Eddie Jackson
- Country of origin: United States
- Original language: English
- No. of seasons: 4
- No. of episodes: 41

Production
- Running time: 22:00
- Production company: Red Arrow Industries

Original release
- Network: Cooking Channel
- Release: February 10, 2019 – March 28, 2021

Yum and Yummer (Note: Although the series' intertitle states Yum & Yummer, the title of the series on the official website is listed as Yum and Yummer.) is an American food reality television series that aired on Cooking Channel. The series is presented by chef Eddie Jackson. The series features Jackson showcasing indulgent food dishes from around the world.

Yum and Yummer premiered on February 10, 2019.

== Episodes ==
Season	Episodes	Originally released	
Season	Episodes	First released	Last released
1	14	February 10, 2019	October 14, 2019
2	13	May 14, 2020	December 27, 2020
3	TBA	January 10, 2021	March 28, 2021

=== Season 1 (2019) ===
No. overall	No. in season	Title	Original release date	U.S. viewers (millions)
1	1	"A Day of Comfort Food"	February 10, 2019	N/A
2	2	"Frankenfoods"	July 22, 2019	N/A
3	3	"Superstuffed"	July 29, 2019	N/A
4	4	"Smothered to the Max"	August 5, 2019	N/A
5	5	"Desserts to Die For"	August 12, 2019	N/A
6	6	"Serious Sandwiches"	August 19, 2019	N/A
7	7	"By the Sea"	August 26, 2019	N/A
8	8	"Between the Bun"	September 2, 2019	N/A
9	9	"Cheat Day"	September 9, 2019	N/A
10	10	"The Whole Hog"	September 16, 2019	N/A
11	11	"United Tastes of America"	September 23, 2019	N/A
12	12	"Spice Up Your Life"	September 30, 2019	N/A
13	13	"Deep-Fried Frenzy"	October 7, 2019	N/A
14	14	"Game Day Grub"	October 14, 2019	N/A

=== Season 2 (2020) ===
No. overall	No. in season	Title	Original release date	U.S. viewers (millions)
15	1	"Hot 'n' Spicy"	May 14, 2020	N/A
16	2	"Veg Out"	May 21, 2020	N/A
17	3	"Endless Pasta-bilities"	May 28, 2020	N/A
18	4	"Pizza Party"	June 4, 2020	N/A
19	5	"Grillin' It"	June 11, 2020	N/A
20	6	"Summertime Eats"	June 18, 2020	N/A
21	7	"Winner, Winner, Chicken Dinner"	November 15, 2020	N/A
22	8	"Nutty for Nuts"	November 22, 2020	N/A
23	9	"More Cheese, Please"	November 29, 2020	N/A
24	10	"Crazy for Crunch"	December 6, 2020	N/A
25	11	"Flavors of the World"	December 13, 2020	N/A
26	12	"Carb Overload"	December 20, 2020	N/A
27	13	"Mexican Fiesta"	December 27, 2020	N/A

=== Season 3 (2021) ===
No. overall	No. in season	Title	Original release date	U.S. viewers (millions)
28	1	"Let Them Eat Sweets"	January 10, 2021	N/A
29	2	"Where's the Beef?"	January 17, 2021	N/A
30	3	"Asian Sensations"	January 24, 2021	N/A
31	4	"Black-Owned Restaurants"	January 31, 2021	N/A
32	5	"Campus Cravings"	February 7, 2021	N/A
33	6	"Fit for a King"	February 14, 2021	N/A
34	7	"Food Truck Frenzy"	February 21, 2021	N/A
35	8	"Flavor Mashups"	February 28, 2021	N/A
36	9	"Southern Staples"	March 7, 2021	N/A
37	10	"Tastes of Texas"	March 14, 2021	N/A
38	11	"Childhood Favorites"	March 21, 2021	N/A
39	12	"Fruity Foodie"	March 28, 2021	N/A
