= Stacey Poon-Kinney =

American chef

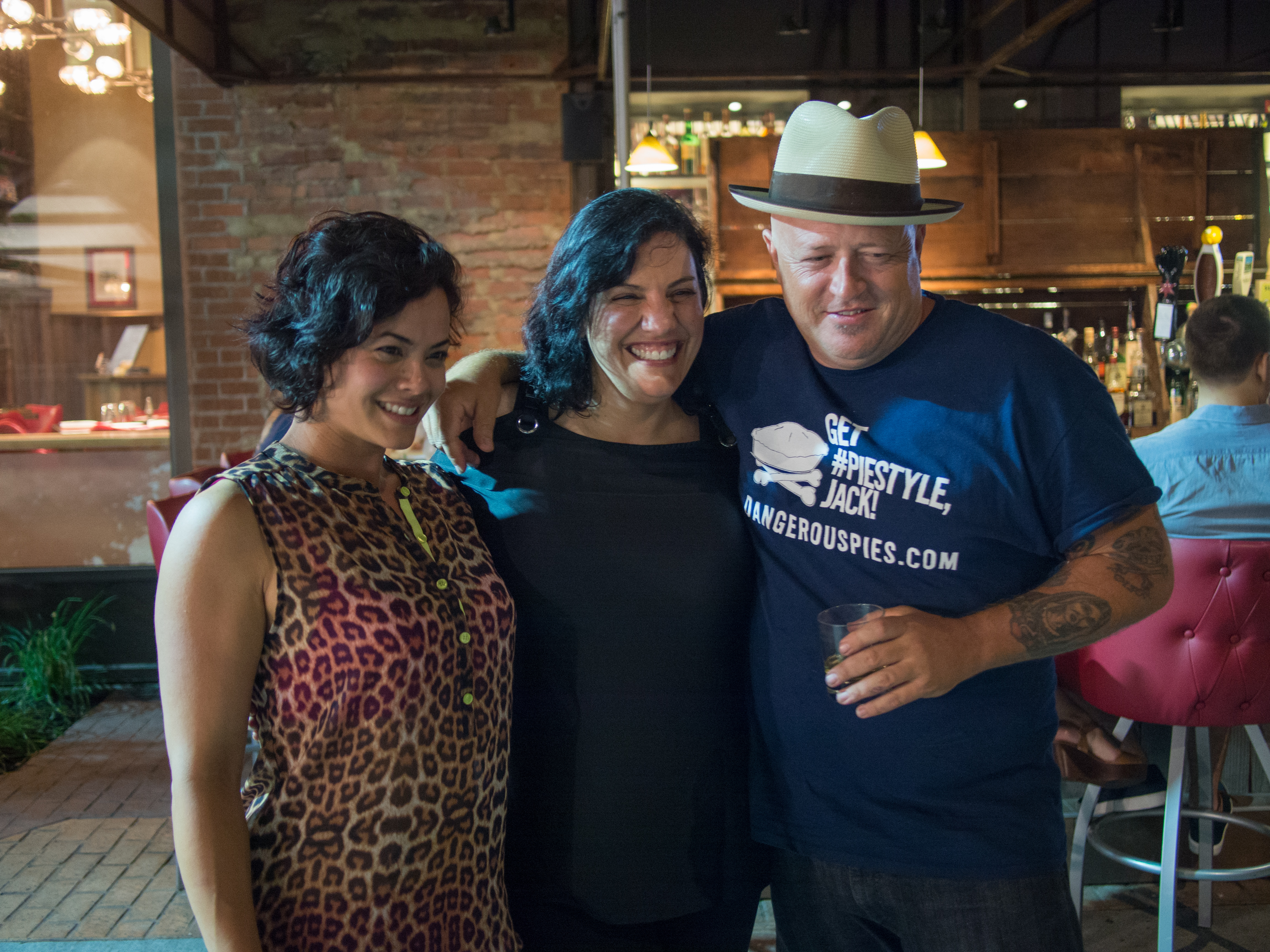
- L-R: Poon-Kinney, Anna Harouvis and Food Network Star contestant Rodney Henry at Veggie U (Milan, OH); July 13, 2013
- Born: 1978 or 1979 (age 45–46); San Diego, California, United States
- Spouse: Saratoga Sake
- Children: 2
- Culinary career
- Cooking style: Organic food
- Current restaurant(s): The Trails Neighborhood Eatery; San Carlos, San Diego, California, United States

Stacey Poon-Kinney is an American chef and restaurateur. She came to prominence as a contestant on the ninth season of the Food Network series Food Network Star.

== Food Network ==
=== Restaurant: Impossible ===
In 2011, Poon-Kinney's restaurant, The Trails Neighborhood Eatery, was featured in an episode of the Food Network series Restaurant: Impossible. It was reported that after the show aired, the restaurant experienced an 80% increase in sales due in part to dinner service, which the restaurant did not previously offer.

=== Food Network Star ===
In 2013, it was announced that Poon-Kinney had been selected as a contestant on the ninth season of the Food Network series Food Network Star. Out of the twelve finalists, she proceeded to the top four, and she pitched an idea to producers for a potential series called Stacey's Modern Magic. Although deemed by critics to be a frontrunner for the season, Poon-Kinney was eliminated from the show on August 4, 2013, finishing in fourth place. Her elimination was met with anger and surprise by many viewers, and the decision was described as "shocking" by the season's eventual winner, Damaris Phillips.

== Personal life ==
Poon-Kinney lives in Spring Valley, California with her husband, painter Saratoga Sake. They have two children.
