= Jeff Mauro =

American chef

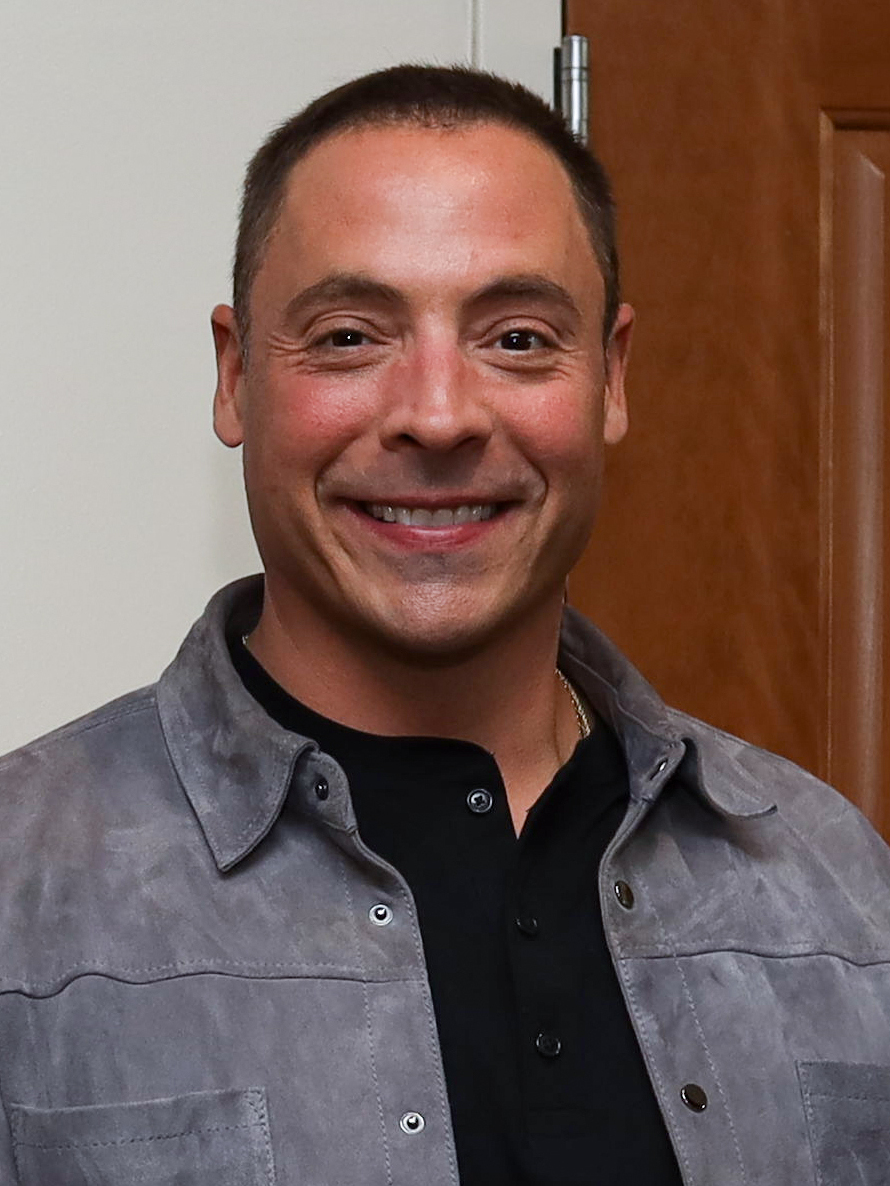
- Mauro in 2025
- Born: July 24, 1978 (age 47); Chicago, Illinois
- Education: Bradley University
- Spouse: Sarah
- Culinary career
- Television shows: $24 in 24; Sandwich King; The Kitchen; Kitchen Sink

Jeff Mauro (born July 24, 1978) is the co-host of the Food Network series The Kitchen and host of Sandwich King and $24 in 24. Prior to this, he was the winner of the seventh season of the Food Network Star competition. Mauro, who is originally from Oak Park, Illinois, incorporates local Chicago restaurants into the context of his show.

== Early life and education ==
Mauro was born in Chicago, Illinois on July 24, 1978.

Mauro graduated from Bradley University in Peoria, Illinois, in 2000, where he studied radio and television. After graduating, he opened up Prime Time Deli & Catering in Westmont, Illinois, with his cousin and fell in love with cooking. He moved Los Angeles to pursue his love for cooking and comedy.

A few years later he enrolled in the Le Cordon Bleu culinary program to refine his cooking skills. He graduated valedictorian and then returned to Chicago where he taught cooking lessons, was a private chef, was a sandwich artist, and performed on stage during weekends.

== Career ==
In 2011, he won winner the seventh season of the Food Network Star competition. During Food Network Star, where fifteen contestants competed for an opportunity to have their own cooking show, Mauro concentrated on sandwiches throughout the competition. The judges on the show noted Mauro's humor and likable persona, which are focal points of his personality on Sandwich King.

Mauro rejected criticisms that there wasn't enough to say about sandwiches to fill out a season, noting that any hand-held "meal" could be classified as a sandwich. In 2012, Mauro was nominated for a Daytime Emmy award for his show Sandwich King on the Food Network Channel. The award eventually went to Bobby Flay for his show Bobby Flay's Barbecue Addiction.

In January 2014, Mauro became a co-host on the Food Network series The Kitchen along with Sunny Anderson, Katie Lee, Marcela Valladolid and Geoffrey Zakarian.

In January 2021 he began hosting Kitchen Crash on Food Network, an update of Gordon Elliott's Door Knock Dinners.

In 2022, Mauro co-hosted season 24 of Worst Cooks in America, coaching a team of 1990s celebrities against a team led by fellow co-host Anne Burrell, who won the contest with her "recruit" Tracey Gold. He came back for season 26 where his contestant, Jessica, won the season. Mauro will return for season 30 with Tiffany Derry as his co-host.
