= Aarti Sequeira =

Indian-American chef (born 1978)

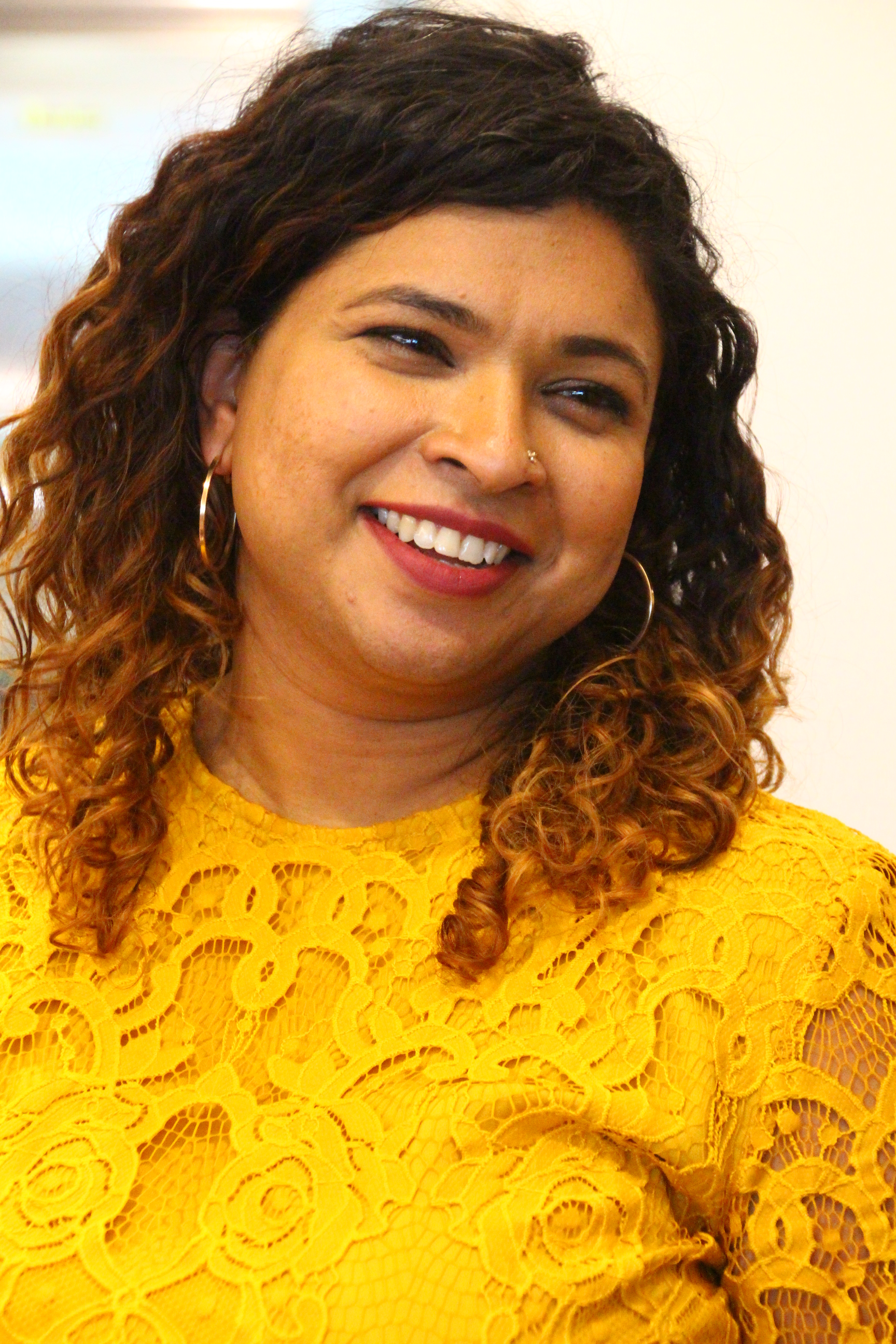
- Sequeira in 2019
- Born: Aarti Lucica Sequeira; 19 August 1978 (age 48); Bombay, Maharashtra, India
- Citizenship: United States
- Education: Northwestern University
- Spouse: Brendan "Bren" McNamara
- Children: 2
- Culinary career
- Cooking style: Indian cuisine
- Television shows
- Aarti Party; Guy's Grocery Games, Taste in Translation; The Next Food Network Star

Aarti Lucica Sequeira (born 19 August 1978) is an Indian-American cook and television personality, best known as the winner of the sixth season of Food Network's reality television show, The Next Food Network Star. In 2010, after her victory, her show Aarti Party premiered on the network. Following Aarti Party, she went on to host Taste in Translation on Cooking Channel, in which she seeks out the most popular dishes from around the world. She had previously worked as a CNN news producer and in 2008 started the online cooking variety show Aarti Paarti.

== Early life and education ==
Aarti Sequeira was born in Bombay, India, on 19 August 1978. Her family was originally from Mangalore in the state of Karnataka. She has two sisters, and grew up in a traditional Indian Catholic home. When she was still an infant, her family moved to Dubai due to better job opportunities for her father. Sequeira was educated in a primarily Indian-attended school in Dubai until age seven, when she was transferred to a British school, which was initially a challenge for her as she felt like an outsider. She participated in music-related activities at school, including choir and playing piano.

Sequeira said cooking was a large part of her family's identity, and she credits much of her culinary inspiration to her Indian cultural background and her mother's influence. She called her grandmother an "incredible, incredible cook". Sequeira's mother started keeping a recipe journal after her own mother died, which inspired Sequeira to start her own recipe journal starting at age 10. Her fondest food memories as a child were her father's weekly trips to the market for fresh fish and produce, as well as her mother's daily recipe creations. She was also exposed to cuisines of other countries, including homemade pastas in the home of her Italian best friend, and Arabian spit-roasted shawarmas her family ate every Friday. As a child, Sequeira would sometimes pretend to host a cooking show, She moved to the United States in 1996. and she was nicknamed "Showcase" because she enjoyed dancing and performing for people.

Sequeira was inspired to pursue a career in journalism after watching CNN cable news coverage of the Gulf War as a child. She aspired to work at CNN and pursue a career like that of journalist Christiane Amanpour. Sequeira graduated from Northwestern University's Medill School of Journalism in 2000, with a degree in Broadcast Journalism, with an adjunct major in International Relations. She worked at the school's student-run radio and television stations as a student, and spent a short time in Washington, D.C. covering the United States Congress for a local news station in Fargo, North Dakota. Sequeira described Medill as a challenging school, but said it helped make her feel tougher, more prepared for challenges, and "like I had something to offer".

== Early career ==
Two weeks after her graduation from Medill, Aarti started working as a production assistant for CNN in Chicago. One year later, she transferred to CNN's bureau in New York City, where she worked as a producer and helped cover the September 11 attacks, which occurred while the show she was producing was on the air. Sequeira produced stories about challenges firefighters faced after the attacks, as well as other topics like economic news. She was eventually promoted to segment producer for CNN, producing shows for the network and packages for various networks and outlets in the company.

Sequeira worked for CNN until 2003, and in 2004 moved from New York City to Los Angeles, California, to be near her husband Brendan McNamara, who was pursuing an acting career. She freelanced for CNN's Los Angeles bureau and other outlets, as well as other outlets in the city's entertainment industry, but otherwise had trouble finding work, and began to crave a different career path than journalism. She called this a difficult realization because "it felt like my very identity had vanished", but that she found some solace in cooking. Sequeira began working on the production of Sand and Sorrow, a documentary about the Darfur crisis. She began as what she called a "Girl Friday" before becoming promoted to co-producer on the documentary, which was released in 2007 on HBO. Sequeira began to develop an interest in cooking during this time, partially inspired by receiving the Joy of Cooking cookbook as a wedding gift, as well as a gift certificate her cousin gave her for a local 12-week cooking program. Her husband enrolled her at the New School of Cooking in Culver City. She competed in both levels of its professional classes, and interned for chef and restaurateur Suzanne Goin at the West Hollywood restaurant Lucques, but after the experience felt she did not aspire to own or run a restaurant, which made her start to feel "lost" and without purpose. Sequeira earned a professional certificate from the school in 2007.

A friend suggested Sequeira start a cooking show on the video-sharing website YouTube, an idea she initially regarded with skepticism. In 2008, she started an online cooking variety show called Aarti Paarti, as well as a food blog called AartiPaarti.com, which included the tagline "eat. giggle. repeat." The name "Aarti Paarti" came from her husband Brendon McNamara, who previously suggested it on a date when they were discussing possible Ben & Jerry's ice cream flavors that could include Sequeira's name. She initially found the phrase too cheesy, but he suggested it as a title when she began her online show, and she found it was a good way to help people recognize and remember her name. After filming the first segment by herself, her husband began helping her record subsequent episodes, which were filmed in the kitchen of her small studio apartment in Los Angeles. She felt comfortable working in front of the camera because she felt cooking segments were less pressure than some of the journalistic stories upon which she previously worked.

Inspired by her childhood, Sequeira prepared Indian and Middle Eastern dishes on the show, which also included brief comedic interludes and variety segments that included Sequeira playing the ukulele, belly dancing, or juggling. She said these skits helped attract viewers from different demographics to her show, including teenage boys. Sequeira also hosted cooking segments for the website GoodBite.com for about one year. Sequeira initially doubted whether a cooking show was the best use of her education and training instead of something more "serious", but a friend and producer at NBC News encouraged her and "(made) me feel like a cooking show career could impact people just as much as a good news story could -- it can inspire, it can relax, it can inform".

Sequeira said she experienced imposter syndrome in her early years making cooking videos because she had not gone to culinary school or worked in restaurants for a long period of time. Sequeira said she occasionally felt she was "not the best person for this job because I'm not your quintessential Indian", not having grown up in the country, and she described her early videos as "almost like doing an experiment; I was doing it because something in me was compelling me to do it". Sequeira openly discussed her struggles with self-doubt on her blog, which she later said helped her grow her following.

== The Next Food Network Star ==
In part due to encouragement from her husband Sequeira auditioned to be a contestant on The Next Food Network Star, a Food Network reality television series in which the winner is awarded his or her own culinary show on the network. In 2010, Sequeira became a participant on the sixth season of the show, where 12 contestants participated in cooking competitions and on-camera challenges. The Houston Chronicle described her as an "early fan favorite". Although Sequeira believed her experience with the Aarti Paarti online show would give her an advantage with the camera segments, she instead found them to be very challenging. Judges and critics were attracted to her bubbly personality, sense of humor, on-screen charisma, and strong food, though they repeatedly commented upon her admitted lack of self-confidence. Sequeira participated in 18 challenges over 10 weeks during her time on the show, and she ranked among the bottom contestants twice, but avoided elimination both times. The first time she faced possible elimination, series judge and Food Network executive Bob Tuschman said, "You were a frontrunner," and Sequeira said his use of past tense made her realize she could not become complacent and had to work harder in future challenges.

Sequeira won several of the weekly challenges, including an Iron Chef-style cook-off competition in the penultimate episode, which drew her particularly strong praise from judges Cat Cora, Bobby Flay, Masaharu Morimoto, and Michael Symon. In June 2010, six weeks before the finale aired, Sequeira's name was on a list of chefs on the Food Network website, leading to speculation that she would win and that the network had mistakenly listed her before her victory was made public. During the season finale on August 15, Sequeira was tasked with shooting a pilot of her possible television series. Sequeira's pilot was Aarti Party, the title and style of the show were based upon her previous online cooking show, Aarti Paarti. Sequeira felt more confident about shooting the pilot compared to some of the other challenges, because there was no time limit and it did not involve cooking for celebrity judges. Entertainment Weekly writer Michael Slezak called Sequeira's pilot "thoroughly engaging and casually informative, while managing to present a dish that looked equal parts unique and delicious". Sequeira was selected as winner of The Next Food Network Star, defeating fellow finalists Tom Pizzica and Herb Mesa.

This show represented a series of historic firsts in representation. It was the first female-led transition of a webseries into a network series. Sequeira became the first Indian woman to be the on-screen lead on a U.S.-made broadcast television series on U.S. national television. Her preceding win on NFNS made Sequeira the first Indian person and first immigrant, non-citizen to win a U.S. reality competition series. 'Aarti Party' also made Sequeira the first Asian woman to host her own cooking show series on Food Network, the first chef to host an Indian-cuisine centric series on cable television and the first immigrant, non-citizen to host their own recurring series on an English-language U.S. cable network.

Tuschman said of Sequeira: "Aarti has that all-too-rare combination we seek in our stars: a passionate food expert who is warm, radiant, fun, and relatable." Slezak said of her victory: "the right person took home the crown".

== Food Network career ==
The Food Network launched Sequeira's six-episode cooking show Aarti Party on August 22, 2010, one week after her victory on The Next Food Network Star. The half-hour series focused on easy ways to enhance American favorite dishes with Indian flavors and influences. It marked the Food Network's first show focused on Indian cuisine, and Sequeira became one of the network's first Asian hosts. She was also featured in Food Network Magazine and appeared at the Food Network New York City Wine & Food Festival that October. The series was filmed on a sound stage at Culver Studios in Culver City. Sequeira had to conceive 40 recipes in the span of one month for the series, which she described as challenging but "great for your brain because you start thinking creatively much more quickly". She was able to utilize recipes she had prepared and published on her blog prior to appearing on Food Network. She had originally hoped the series would have variety show elements, like her online show, but that did not happen due to time restraints. Aarti Party was renewed for a second season, which debuted in December 2010, and then later received a third season, but was cancelled after about one year.

In September 2012, Sequeira was a headliner at the Savor the Central Coast, a culinary festival in San Luis Obispo County, California. She hosted the series Taste in Translation and was a co-host on Drop 5lbs with Good Housekeeping, both of which debuted in January 2013 on the Cooking Channel. Sequeira also hosted Hidden Eats, a Cooking Channel travel series, making her the first Asian woman host of a National Food Travelogue series on US national television: helmed Taste in Translation (Cooking Channel, 2013) and was a contestant on the competitive cooking reality shows Cutthroat Kitchen All-Stars and Chopped All-Stars, winning on both. She is a frequent judge on cooking game shows Guy's Grocery Games, hosted by Guy Fieri, and From Duff Til Dawn, hosted by Duff Goldman. Fieri nicknamed Sequeira "the spice queen" because of her love of spices. She has also appeared on various other Food Network and Cooking Channel shows, including The Best Thing I Ever Ate, The Best Thing I Ever Made, Guilty Pleasures, Unique Eats, and Unique Sweets. In November 2020, Sequeira appeared on a special Thanksgiving episode of the Selena Gomez-hosted HBO Max cooking show Selena + Chef. In the episode, entitled "Selena + Aarti: Friendsgiving", Sequeira helped Gomez cook a Thanksgiving turkey for the first time. Since 2021, Sequeira has appeared as a judge on the holiday-themed cooking reality shows Holiday Wars, and Halloween Wars.

Sequeira published a cookbook called Aarti Paarti: An American Kitchen with an Indian Soul, which was published in 2014 by Grand Central Publishing and became a Top 10-ranked Indian cookbook on Amazon. She called the book an extension of both her Aarti Party show and the family recipe books her mother made in her youth, and said she hoped the book would be a "gateway drug to Indian food" for non-Indian readers. Her favorite recipe from the book was the ground beef dish keema, which she said she makes for her own family every two weeks. Los Angeles Times food writer Russ Parsons praised the books fun approach to cooking, writing: "there is so much joy in her food that you can't help but smile when reading her recipes". In 2015, Sequeira began writing a recurring food column for the Associated Press, 'World's Fare,' making her the first Asian woman and first immigrant, non-citizen to become a nationally syndicated AP columnist. Sequeira was working on a new cookbook as of August 2022. Sequeira also released a book My Family Recipe Journal: With Prayers and Scriptures, inspired by her recipe journals previously made by herself and her mother. She intended for the book to allow others to document their own culinary traditions and flavors. Published by DaySpring, the book is color-coded and divided into 10 sections, with rooms for eight recipes in each part. Sequeira has been a guest on several talk shows, including The Today Show, The Talk, The Dr. Oz Show, The Nate Berkus Show, and Home & Family.

== Personal life ==
Aarti Sequeira has been married to actor Brendan "Bren" McNamara since 2003. The two met when they were both attending Northwestern University, where McNamara majored in theater studies. They lived in Mid City, Los Angeles as of 2013, and the family moved to Raleigh, North Carolina in 2020.

Sequeira and her husband have two daughters, Eliyah and Moses Marigold. She suffered from post-partum depression after giving birth to Eliyah, and the experience led her to become an advocate for women suffering from post-natal mood disorders. She has been involved with the organization Postpartum Support International.

Sequeira is a Christian and is devoutly religious. In addition to cooking, Sequeira likes improvisational theatre and has taken classes for it, which she said helped give her the courage to post her original cooking videos online. She also enjoys music, Middle Eastern dance, and visiting art galleries. She is active on the social media network Instagram.

== Filmography ==
Television
Year	Series	Role	Notes
2010	The Next Food Network Star	Herself	Contestant: Season 6 (Winner)
2010–2011	Aarti Party	Herself/host	
2013	Taste in Translation	Herself/host	
2014–present	Guy's Grocery Games	Herself/Recurring Judge	
2020	Selena + Aarti Sequeira: Friendsgiving	Herself	
2021–present	Halloween Wars	Herself/Judge	
