= Food Network Star season 9 =

Season of television series

Food Network Star
- Season 9
- No. of contestants: 12
- Winner: Damaris Phillips

Release
- Original network: Food Network
- Original release: June 2 – August 11, 2013

Season chronology
- ← Previous; Season 8 Next → Season 10

The ninth season of the American reality television series Food Network Star premiered Sunday, June 2, 2013.

Season 8 chef mentors Bobby Flay, Giada De Laurentiis, and Alton Brown returned for season 9, but they were not assigned to a team, nor did they hold a final elimination challenge between the bottom contestants. Season 9 featured 12 contestants, just three short of the prior season.

== Contestants ==
=== Winner ===
- Damaris Phillips, 31, Culinary Teacher - Louisville, Kentucky

=== Runner-Up ===
- Rodney Henry, 47, Pie Shop Owner - Baltimore, Maryland
- Russell Jackson, 49, Underground Chef - San Francisco, California

=== Eliminated ===
(In order of elimination)

- Daniela Perez-Reyes, 28, Caterer/Bartender - Haleiwa, Hawaii
- Andres Guillama, 26, Childhood Obesity Prevention Coach - Waynesville, North Carolina
- Danushka Lysek, 37, Private Chef/Model - New York City
- ~~Connie "Lovely" Jackson, 27, Caterer - Los Angeles, California~~ (Returned to competition after winning Star Salvation)
- Viet Pham, 33, Chef/Restaurant Owner - Salt Lake City, Utah
- Chris Hodgson, 26, Chef/Restaurateur - Cleveland, Ohio
- Chad Rosenthal, 37, Restaurant Owner - Ambler, Pennsylvania
- Connie "Lovely" Jackson, 27, Caterer - Los Angeles, California
- Nikki Dinki, 29, Food Blogger/Online Host - New York City
- Stacey Poon-Kinney, 34, Restaurant Owner - San Diego, California

At least six competitors have appeared on other Food Network programs. Pham defeated Bobby Flay on Iron Chef America and also competed on Extreme Chef. Lysek and Henry appeared on Chopped; both were eliminated before the final round. Henry also appeared on Throwdown with Bobby Flay, while Lysek also won during an appearance on 24 Hour Restaurant Battle. Poon-Kinney appeared on Restaurant: Impossible, where Robert Irvine gave her family's restaurant a makeover. Hodgson competed on The Great Food Truck Race; his truck, Hodge Podge, was a runner-up on season 2.

== Contestant progress ==
Contestant	1	2	3	4	5	6	7	8	9	10	11
Damaris	IN	IN	SAFE	IN	IN	HIGH	IN	IN	LOW	IN	WINNER
Rodney	IN	IN	SAFE	LOW	IN	LOW	IN	LOW	IN	IN	RUNNER-UP
Russell	LOW	HIGH	LOW	HIGH	LOW	HIGH	LOW	LOW	HIGH	IN	RUNNER-UP^{2}
Stacey	HIGH	HIGH	LOW	HIGH	WIN	HIGH	SAFE	IN	IN	OUT	
Nikki	HIGH	LOW	HIGH	HIGH	IN	LOW	WIN	IN	OUT		
Lovely	IN	IN	LOW	OUT				OUT ^{1}			
Chad	HIGH	HIGH	HIGH	IN	IN	LOW	OUT				
Chris	IN	IN	IN	IN	IN	OUT					
Viet	IN	IN	IN	LOW	OUT						
Danushka	LOW	LOW	OUT								
Andres	IN	OUT									
Daniela	OUT										

^Note 1 : Lovely won Star Salvation and returned to the competition, but was eliminated the same week she came back.
^Note 2 : Russell was eliminated from the final three midway through the finale.

(WINNER) The contestant won the competition and became the next "Food Network Star".
(RUNNER-UP) The contestant made it to the finale, but could not make it.
(WIN) The contestant won the 'Star Challenge' for that week.
(SAFE) The contestant won 'immunity' from elimination by winning the Camera Challenge.
(HIGH) The contestant was one of the Selection Committee's favorites for that week.
(IN) The contestant was neither one of the Selection Committee's favorites nor their least favorite. They were not up for elimination.
(LOW) The contestant was one of the Selection Committee's three or four least favorites for that week, but was not eliminated.
(LOW) The contestant was one of the Selection Committee's two least favorites for that week, but was not eliminated.
(OUT) The contestant was the Selection Committee's least favorite for that week, and was eliminated.

== Episode summaries ==
=== Week One: Are You Ready For Prime-Time? ===
1. Camera Challenge: The 12 contestants must make a 30-second pitch to network executives Bob Tuschman and Susie Fogelson; the pitch is also shown to a focus group, who are given reaction meters to rate their impressions. Following this, they have 45 minutes to create a dish that highlights potatoes.
  - Top 3: Chad, Nikki, and Stacey
  - Bottom 3: Russell, Danushka, and Daniela
    - Eliminated: Daniela
2. Original air date: June 2, 2013

=== Week Two: Burger Bash ===
1. Camera Challenge: The contestants must make a burger for 100 burger enthusiasts and make a two-minute presentation to the audience. Each audience member has a token and will give their token to the contestant whose burger they want to taste.
  - Top 3: Russell, Chad, and Stacey
  - Bottom 3: Nikki, Danushka, and Andres
    - Eliminated: Andres
2. Original air date: June 9, 2013

=== Week Three: A Star is Chopped ===
1. Mentor Challenge: The contestants are separated into two groups, led by Alton and Bobby, and must prepare a dish using an exotic ingredient. The winners from each group receive an advantage in the next challenge.
  - Team Alton winner: Rodney
  - Team Bobby winner: Damaris
2. Chopped Challenge: The contestants face the Chopped Challenge, in which Iron Chef Alex Guarnaschelli, Alton and Bobby judge two heats of a Chopped-style competition. For winning the Mentor Challenge, Damaris and Rodney earn a place on the judging panel for their respective teams and are safe from elimination.
3. Round 1: Viet, Danushka, Chad and Russell face off against one another using foods found at a baseball game: cotton candy, hot dogs, peanuts and beer. Damaris joins the judges for this heat.
4. Round 2: Chris, Lovely, Nikki and Stacey face off against one another using kids' foods: chicken nuggets, fruit leathers, cheddar fish crackers and apple juice. Rodney joins the judges for this heat.
  - Top 2: Nikki and Chad
  - Bottom 3: Stacey, Russell, and Danushka
    - Eliminated: Danushka
5. Original air date: June 16, 2013

=== Week Four: Big Screen Bites ===
1. Camera Challenge: The contestants are divided into teams of three, each representing a classic movie theme. The teams, who will compete at a luxury cinema, must create a menu and a movie trailer based on their theme.
  - Teams:
    - Musical: Lovely, Rodney, and Chris
    - Western: Stacey, Nikki, and Russell
    - Romance: Damaris, Viet, and Chad
  - Top 3: Nikki, Russell, and Stacey
  - Bottom 3: Viet, Rodney, and Lovely
    - Eliminated: Lovely
2. Original air date: June 23, 2013

=== Week Five: 4th of July "Live" ===
- Mentor Challenge: The contestants work with Terrence Jenkins to present live demos of a sausage and pepper sandwich in three minutes. Each contestant is challenged with a different issue during their demonstration including missing peppers, cutting the lights and Terrence walking off the set with a cough.
  - Winner: Rodney
- Camera Challenge: The contestants take part in an interactive show called "4th of July Live." As part of the show, network executive Bob Tuschman returns to judge the challenge. Each of the contestants will be given one of eight stations which range from cooking to a station with a culinary expert.

Chef	Station
Chad	Farm Stand with Farmer Lee
Chris	Coleslaw
Damaris	Cocktails with mixologist Marcos Tello
Nikki	Fried Chicken
Rodney	Dessert
Russell	Potato salad
Stacey	Butcher Station with Lindy and Grundy
Viet	Chips and Dips

- Top 2: Stacey and Nikki
  - Winner: Stacey
- Bottom 2: Russell and Viet
  - Eliminated: Viet
- Original air date: June 30, 2013

=== Week Six: Product Pitch ===
- Star Challenge: The finalists are given one hour to create two potential food products that can be sold on the market. They must then choose which one they will take to market and will have the opportunity to pitch their product to three executives from Kraft Foods, Kellogg's and Target.
  - Top 3: Damaris, Stacey and Russell
  - Bottom 4: Nikki, Chad, Rodney and Chris
    - Eliminated: Chris
- Original air date: July 7, 2013

=== Week Seven: Star Charity Auction ===
1. Camera Challenge: The contestants had to describe Bobby Flay's dish after tasting it and were buzzed by Bobby Flay when they used certain words that were forbidden to use.
  - Top 2: Stacey and Nikki
    - Winner: Stacey
  - Bottom 2: Rodney and Russell
2. Star Challenge: The finalists create their signature dish to tell what type of Food Network Star they are, they then had to describe the dish to a group of adventurous eaters (gastronauts). The dishes were then bid on by the eaters. Whoever earns the highest bid is safe from elimination. For winning the Camera Challenge, Stacey won an extra $10 added on to whatever amount her dish receives in the auction. All proceeds went to Share Our Strength, an organization to combat childhood hunger.
3. Dishes and Bids:
  - Damaris: (Green Bean Casserole) $130
  - Nikki: (Mushroom & Shrimp Pasta) $130
  - Chad: (Texas Barbecue Poutine) $150
  - Russell: (Egg & Bacon Revolution) $150
  - Stacey: (Maple Bacon Cheesecake) $180 + $10 bonus
  - Rodney: (Berry & Rhubarb Pie) $140
4. Top 3: Nikki, Damaris, and Stacey
  - Winner: Nikki
5. Bottom 2: Russell and Chad
  - Eliminated: Chad
6. Original air date: July 14, 2013

=== Week Eight: Food Stories From The Road ===
Prior to the announcement of the Mentors Challenge, Robert Irvine announced the winner of the Star Salvation was Lovely, who returned to the competition.

1. Mentors Challenge: The contestants had to create an Italian dish for the mentors and then had to come up with a tasty description for the dish. As a twist, two contestants at a time are brought in and then the two chefs switch dishes and describe each other. Damaris and Lovely described each other's dishes, Stacey and Rodney judge one another, and Russell and Nikki critique theirs. The winner would receive an advantage in the upcoming Star Challenge.
  - Winner: Nikki
2. Star Challenge: In teams of three, the finalists must film a three-minute "food story show." Nikki, Stacey and Damaris are paired with The Donut Man, while Lovely, Russell and Rodney take Vito's Pizza. Guest judges Janice Min, Gary Baum and Leslie Bruce from The Hollywood Reporter screen and critique the shows; the least successful team lands in the bottom three.
  - Top 2: Damaris and Nikki
  - Bottom 3: Rodney, Russell and Lovely
    - Eliminated: Lovely
3. Original air date: July 21, 2013

=== Week Nine: Menu: Impossible ===
1. Mentor's Challenge: The chefs are asked to create a well-balanced dish in 30 minutes using ingredients from the Food Network Star pantry. During their presentation to Alton, the contestants must explain why they used the ingredients and give a tip for preparing a quick meal. Rodney and Damaris are assigned breakfast dishes, Nikki receives lunch and Russell and Stacey prepare food for dinner.
  - Winner: Stacey
2. Star Challenge: The contestants head to Phil Trani's in Long Beach, California. Restaurant: Impossible host Robert Irvine, along with owner Phil Trani and managers Amber and Ashley, joins Alton and Giada on the judging panel. Irvine challenges the chefs to reinvent failing or outdated dishes on the restaurant's menu. For winning the Mentor's Challenge, Stacey is presented with five dishes and given the opportunity to either cook them or assign them to another chef. Rodney, assigned chicken cacciatore, serves the judges a chicken cacciatore pie. Damaris, assigned tournedos of beef and mashed potatoes, serves a filet with garlic mashed potatoes. Stacey, who chose crab-stuffed halibut with a baked potato, serves a halibut crab cake roulade with potatoes. Nikki, assigned the salmon with onion pepper relish and rice pilaf, serves a broccoli cake with salmon and rice pilaf. Russell, assigned stuffed chicken and rice pilaf, serves a spinach wrapped chicken and risotto.
  - Winner: Russell
  - Bottom 4: Damaris, Stacey, Rodney and Nikki
    - Eliminated: Nikki
3. Original air date: July 28, 2013

=== Week Ten: Network Pitch ===
1. Pitch Challenge: The final four contestants each pitch two show ideas to the mentors. They then must pitch their best idea to network executives Bob Tuschman and Susie Fogelson, who will green-light three of the pilots. Stacey pitches "Stacey's Modern Magic," where she'll take dishes that have "fallen into disrepair" and make them more magical. Russell pitches "Guilty Pleasures," which would turn something ordinary and plain into a "sinful delight," such as adding bacon to an ice cream shop's vanilla ice cream. Damaris pitches "Eat, Date, Love" which would teach men, and America in general, how to win someone over through Southern food and tradition. Finally, Rodney pitches "Pie Style," which takes him to restaurants that would challenge him to turn their signature dish into a pie. The executives and mentors unanimously put Damaris and Rodney through to the next challenge. The decision on the third finalist results in a tie between Stacey and Russell, with Alton yet to vote. Stacey ends up being eliminated.
  - Moved to next round: Damaris, Rodney, Russell
  - Eliminated: Stacey
2. Star Challenge: The final three head out to do their pilots, which will be directed by surprise guest and former Food Network Star winner Guy Fieri. Rodney meets chef Eric Greenspan at The Foundry on Melrose, where he'll remake Greenspan's famous grilled cheese sandwich into a pie using Taleggio cheese and short ribs. Russell shoots his pilot at Bennett's Ice Cream Shop inside the Original Farmers Market in Los Angeles, where he tries the cabernet sauvignon sorbet. He then enters the kitchen to create his own bacon-bourbon sorbet for owner Scott Bennett to try. For Damaris' pilot, she and her student, Josh, create a peppered pork loin on a sweet potato biscuit. Each pilot is shown at the end of the episode: "Pie Style with Rodney Henry," "Guilty Pleasures with Russell Jackson," and "Eat, Date, Love with Damaris Phillips." The viewers then can vote for their favorite contestant through the Food Network's website: Finale Vote.
3. Original air date: August 4, 2013

=== Week Eleven: America Picks a Star ===
- Reunion: The Season Nine winner is announced during a reunion show at Chelsea Manor in New York featuring never-before seen footage and reflections from the competitors and mentors. The contestants and mentors answer questions sent by viewers via Twitter, Skype and email. Midway through the show, Russell is eliminated from the final three, leaving Damaris and Rodney as the final two contestants for the grand prize.
- Runners-Up: Russell (third place), Rodney (second place)
- Winner of Food Network Star: Damaris
- New Show: Southern at Heart
- Original air date: August 11, 2013

== Star Salvation ==
In this season, Food Network Star added a five-week online "Star Salvation" competition, allowing one eliminated contestant a second chance to return to the main competition. Hosted by Robert Irvine, each episode features the most recently eliminated contestant competing against the remaining previously eliminated contestants. Each episode features one or two rounds of competition, judged by Irvine.

Contestant	1		2	3	4
Lovely	IN	WIN	WIN	WIN	WIN
Chad					OUT
Chris				OUT	
Viet			OUT		
Danushka	IN	WIN	OUT		
Andres	IN	OUT			
Daniela	OUT				

(WIN) The chef won Star Salvation and returned to the main competition.
(WIN) The chef won that episode's Star Salvation and continued in the competition.
(IN) The chef continued in the competition.
(OUT) The chef lost in that week's Star Salvation and was eliminated from the competition.

=== Round 1 ===
- Advanced: Andres, Danushka, Lovely
- Eliminated: Daniela

=== Round 2 ===
- Advanced: Danushka and Lovely
- Eliminated: Andres

=== Episode 2 ===
- Winner: Lovely
- Eliminated: Danushka and Viet

=== Episode 3 ===
- Winner: Lovely
- Eliminated: Chris

=== Episode 4 ===
- Winner: Lovely
- Eliminated: Chad
