= Damaris Phillips =

American chef and television personality (born 1980)

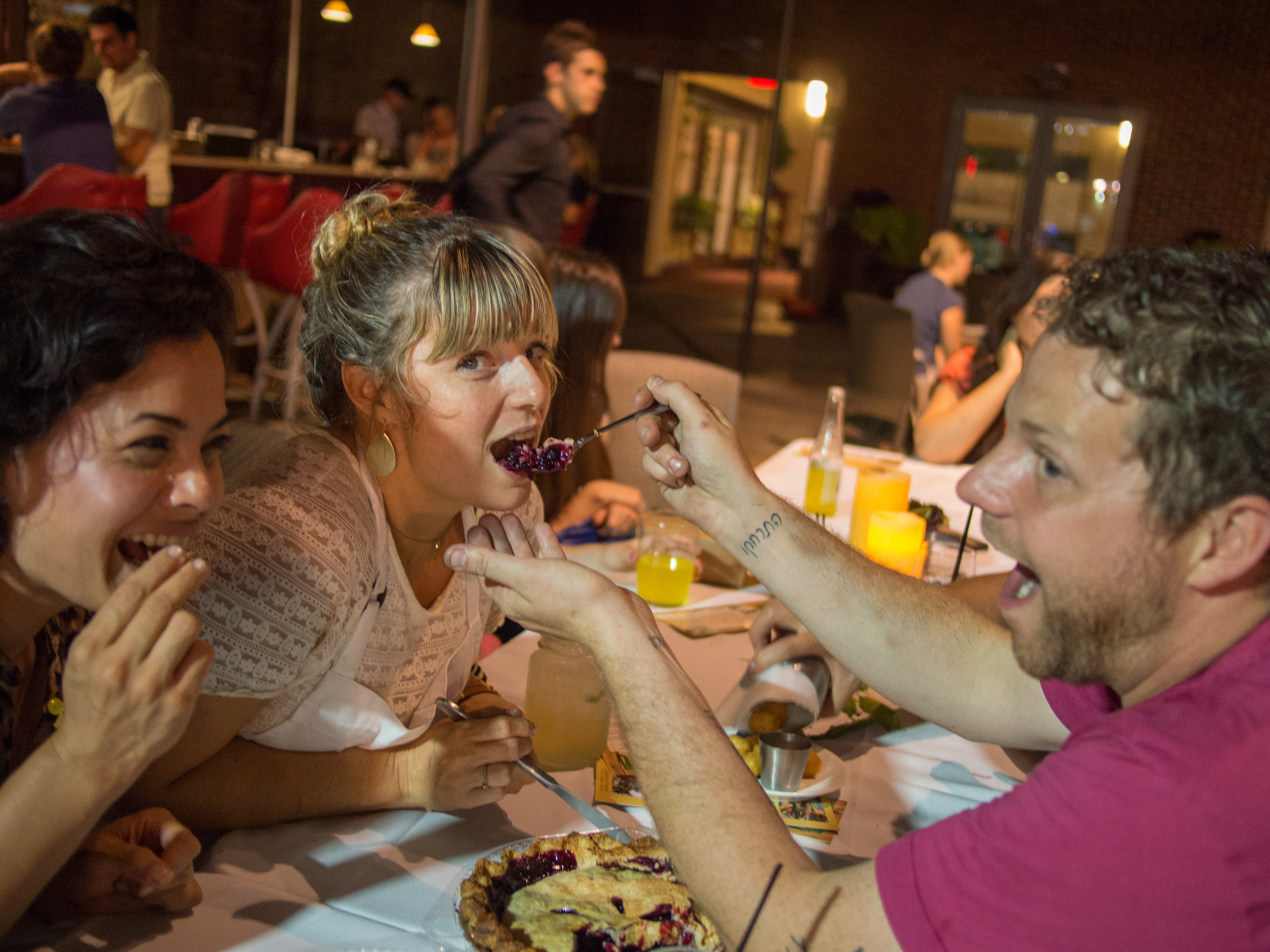
- L-R: Stacey Poon-Kinney, Phillips and Chris Hodgson at Veggie U (Milan, OH); July 13, 2013
- Born: Damaris Lennon Phillips; December 8, 1980 (age 45); Lexington, Kentucky, United States
- Education: Jefferson Community and Technical College
- Spouse: Darrick Wood (m. 2015)
- Culinary career
- Cooking style: Southern cooking
- Television shows: The Bobby and Damaris Show; Kids BBQ Championship; Southern and Hungry; Southern at Heart; Guy's Grocery Games
- Website: www.damarisphillips.com

Damaris Lennon Phillips (born December 8, 1980) is an American chef and television personality. In 2013 she won the ninth season of the Food Network television series Food Network Star. She hosted the Food Network show Southern at Heart for five seasons from 2013 to 2016. In 2018, she began co-hosting The Bobby and Damaris Show on Food Network with Bobby Flay.

== Personal life ==
Phillips was born in Lexington, Kentucky. On June 13, 2015, she married Darrick Wood in Louisville, Kentucky.

== Education ==
Damaris Phillips graduated from Jefferson Community and Technical College, where she earned a degree in Culinary Arts. She has stated that she decided to attend culinary school because she "didn't know what to do in life". Phillips later went on to become a culinary instructor.

== Food Network ==
=== Food Network Star ===
In early 2013, Phillips was a contestant on the ninth season of the Food Network series Food Network Star. As one of the final three contestants, she filmed a pilot for a potential series called Eat, Date, Love. Phillips was announced as the winner of the competition on August 11, 2013.

=== Southern at Heart ===
As a reward for winning Food Network Star, Phillips got her own show on Food Network, Southern at Heart. The show premiered on October 27, 2013. The first season aired on Sundays at 10:30 am/9:30c and consisted of six episodes. The show ultimately ran for five seasons, from 2013 to 2016, with most seasons consisting of 13 episodes. Phillips posted regular show reviews and updates to her Facebook page. An episode airing on April 19, 2015, was watched by 816,000 viewers.

=== The Bobby and Damaris Show ===
Since September 2017, she has co-hosted The Bobby and Damaris Show on Food Network with her former Food Network Star co-judge Bobby Flay.

=== Southern and Hungry ===
In October 2017, she began co-hosting Southern and Hungry with Rutledge Wood (her brother-in-law) on Cooking Channel.

=== Guy's Grocery Games ===
Damaris frequently appears on Guy's Grocery Games as both a judge and as a competing chef.

She often raises money for charity when competing, most frequently for the story program in Louisville, Kentucky.
