= Food Network Star season 7 =

Food Network Star
- Season 7
- No. of contestants: 15
- Winner: Jeff Mauro
- No. of episodes: 11

Release
- Original network: Food Network
- Original release: June 5 – August 14, 2011

Season chronology
- ← Previous; Season 6 Next → Season 8

The seventh season of the renamed American reality television series Food Network Star premiered Sunday, June 5, 2011. Food Network executives, Bob Tuschman and Susie Fogelson, are joined again by Bobby Flay and Giada De Laurentiis as the judges for this season. The series was filmed in Los Angeles, California and New York, New York.

After the first episode of this season aired as "The Next Food Network Star", the series was retitled Food Network Star and this name was used from the second episode onward.

== Contestants ==
=== Eliminated ===
(In order of elimination)

- Howie Drummond – Highlands Ranch, Colorado
- Juba Kali – New Orleans, Louisiana
- Katy Clark – Long Beach, California
- Alicia Sanchez – New York, New York
- Justin Balmes – Marietta, Georgia
- Justin Davis – Minneapolis, Minnesota
- Orchid Paulmeier – Bluffton, South Carolina
- Chris Nirschel – Hoboken, New Jersey
- Penny Davidi – Los Angeles, California
- Jyll Everman – Glendora, California
- Whitney Chen – New York, New York
- Mary Beth Albright – Washington, D.C.
- Vic "Vegas" Moea – Las Vegas, Nevada

=== Runner-Up ===
- Susie Jimenez – Aspen, Colorado

=== Winner ===
- Jeff Mauro – Elmwood Park, Illinois

== Contestant Progress ==
Contestant	1	2	3	4	5	6	7	8	9	10	11	
Camera; Challenge; Winner	Orchid	Penny	Jyll	Jyll	None	N/A	Whitney	Jyll; Mary Beth	Jeff	N/A	Susie	
Jeff	WIN	IN	WIN	WIN	HIGH	IN	IN	WIN	WIN	LOW	IN	WINNER
Susie	IN	IN	LOW	WIN	WIN	HIGH	IN	LOW	HIGH	WIN	WIN	RUNNER-UP
Vic	LOW	IN	WIN	WIN	HIGH	WIN	IN	LOW	HIGH	WIN	OUT	
Mary Beth	IN	WIN	LOW	WIN	IN	LOW	LOW	LOW	LOW	OUT		
Whitney	IN	WIN	IN	LOW	IN	LOW	IN	HIGH	OUT			
Jyll	LOW	IN	IN	IN	LOW	IN	LOW	OUT				
Penny	IN	IN	WIN	LOW	IN	HIGH	OUT					
Chris	IN	LOW	WIN	IN	IN	IN	OUT					
Orchid	WIN	IN	IN	WIN	LOW	OUT						
Justin D.	IN	IN	WIN	LOW	OUT							
Justin B.	IN	WIN	WIN	OUT								
Alicia	IN	LOW	OUT									
Katy	IN	OUT										
Juba	WIN	OUT										
Howie	OUT											

(WINNER) The contestant won the competition and became the next "Food Network Star".
(RUNNER-UP) The contestant made it to the finale, but did not win.
(WIN) The contestant won that episode's Star Challenge.
(HIGH) The contestant was one of the Selection Committee's favorites for that week, but did not win the Star Challenge.
(IN) The contestant was not one of the Selection Committee's favorites nor their least favorites. They were not up for elimination.
(LOW) The contestant was one of the Selection Committee's three or four least favorites for that week, but was not eliminated.
(LOW) The contestant was one of the Selection Committee's two least favorites for that week, but was not eliminated.
(OUT) The contestant was the Selection Committee's least favorite for that week, and was eliminated.

== Episodes ==
=== Week One: Lights, Camera, Cook ===
- Camera Challenge: The contestants created breakfast dishes representing their culinary points of view and presented them on camera.
  - Winner: Orchid (Breakfast Tortilla)
- Star Challenge: The contestants were divided into groups of three and got four takes to create promos with Alton Brown. Then, the groups headed to the Food Star Kitchens to create one dish on their own and one collaborative dish. After, they presented their dishes and promos to the Selection Committee, Brown, and special guests, including Extra host Mario Lopez.
  - Winners: Juba (Boil Spiced Shrimp with Whole Tomato Ketchup), Jeff (Chicken Slider on Ciabatta Bread) and Orchid (Hot Asian Pork Skewer with Coleslaw) (collaborative dish: "Que" Lime Pie with Mango Coulis and Chili Whipped Cream)
  - Eliminated: Howie (Potato Gnocchi with Lemon Zest)

Original Air Date: June 5, 2011

=== Week Two: In the Line of Fire ===
- Camera Challenge: The contestants created pizzas that reflected their culinary points of view and presented them on camera. For the first time on Food Network Star, a contestant was eliminated after the Camera Challenge.
  - Winner: Penny (Middle Eastern Pizza with Roasted Eggplant, Mint and Feta Cheese)
  - Eliminated: Juba (Three-Pepper "Holy Trinity" Pizza with Toasted Pinenuts, Clam Juice and White Wine)
- Star Challenge: As the Camera Challenge winner, Penny was awarded the task of creating the teams for the Star Challenge. The challenge was to render dishes that were time-consuming, technically difficult and that had expensive ingredients accessible to untrained home cooks. The teams presented their dishes to the selection committee and to guest judges Anne Burrell, Scott Conant and Pat and Gina Neely. The contestants were not only judged on their culinary merits but also on their personalities in the kitchen.
  - Winners: Whitney (Ginger-Orange Biscuit, Bacon and Pan-Sausage Gravy), Mary Beth (Rib-Eye Steak in Red Wine Sauce with Marrow Bone) and Justin B. (Pan-Fried Calamari Steak with Clams)
  - Eliminated: Katy (Pepper Short Ribs on Gorgonzola Mashed Potatoes with Bacon and Apple-Walnut Shallot Compote)

Original Air Date: June 12, 2011

=== Week Three: Dueling Desserts ===
- Camera Challenge: Each finalist went to a vending machine filled with Hershey candy. The type of candy they got was what they had to use in their dish. They then presented to camera once cooking was complete.
  - Winner: Jyll (Almond Joy Coconut-Fried Shrimp)
- Star Challenge: The finalists were put into two groups with six people represented by Robert Irvine or Duff Goldman. As Jyll was the winner of the Camera Challenge, she picked which chef her group would be based on (Chef Duff), and who would be in her group. Each made a dessert for 150 people and for the Selection Committee, as well as two group collaboration dishes.
  - Winners: Team Robert (Chris, Jeff, Justin B., Justin D., Penny, and Vic)
  - Eliminated: Alicia (Vanilla Bean Cupcakes with Fondant Star)

Original Air Date: June 19, 2011

=== Week Four: Cougar Town and Paula Deen ===
- Camera Challenge: The finalists were given a Kellogg's product to cook with and had to present their dishes to camera. Michael Symon and Melissa d'Arabian were the guests for the challenge and helped give advice for further success.
  - Winner: Jyll (Rice Krispies Crab Fritter with Spicy Aioli)
- Star Challenge: The finalists were divided into pairs to create a lunch for 150 people on the set of the TV show Cougar Town. Paula Deen was the surprise guest and shared words of wisdom with the contestants regarding their personalities. Each pair had to base their meal on a specific on-set job and what the workers doing the job would like to eat for lunch. Once all pairs had served those workers, the contestants then served a small table of people, including the selection committee, Courteney Cox and Brian Van Holt. (During the judging, the judges stated they had originally planned to declare one winning team, but felt that it was more appropriate to choose one winner from each team.)
  - Winners: Jeff (Thai Basil Tofu Lettuce Cups), Mary Beth (Buttermilk-Soaked Panko Meatloaf), Orchid (Dirty Rice and Collard Greens), Susie (Chicken and Quinoa-Stuffed Peppers) and Vic (Roasted Vegetable Baked Penne)
  - Eliminated: Justin B. (Seared Tuna over Israeli Couscous and White Balsamic Vinaigrette)

Original Air Date: June 26, 2011

=== Week Five: Diners, Drive-Ins and Fourth of July ===
- Camera Challenge: Guy Fieri took the finalists to a Mel's Diner in Hollywood. They were broken into five pairs and were assigned to do a specific segment similar to those done on Diners, Drive-Ins and Dives: open the show, interview the owner, interview the executive chef, interview the head server, and close the show. No winner was declared in this challenge.
  - Winner: None
- Star Challenge: The finalists had to prepare a Fourth of July meal for 150 people. First, they were assigned an original summertime meal to re-create. The finalists had two hours to prepare their meals in the Food Star Kitchen before packing up for presentation the next day. Once they got to the field where the Fourth of July event was being held, a special challenge was presented - they had to give a three-minute demo to all 150 people and the Selection Committee, before handing out the food. (Props were allowed to be used during the presentations)
  - Winner: Susie (Ribs and Coleslaw as Spicy Pork Ribs with Tangy Avocado-Lime "Slaw")
  - Eliminated: Justin D. (Burger and Watermelon as Pork Burger with Grilled Pickled Watermelon Salad and Blue Cheese)

Original Air Date: July 3, 2011

=== Week Six: Food Truck Face-Off ===
- Camera Challenge: None
- Star Challenge: The finalists were greeted by Tyler Florence and put into three teams of three. Their task was to create food to be sold to 150 people from a food truck. Before the cooking started, each team had a few minutes to come up with a name for their truck, create a theme and decide what dish each contestant would cook. Each team filmed a commercial to be shown to potential customers, designed to entice them to the truck. When the customers arrived, the commercials were shown, and the customers picked up a ticket for the truck they wanted to patronize.
  - Winner: Vic (Philly Cheesesteak Burrito with American cheese)
  - Eliminated: Orchid (Adobo Pork Taco with Coleslaw)

Original Air Date: July 10, 2011

=== Week Seven: Dinner Party for Wolfgang Puck ===
- Camera Challenge: The contestants had to make their own signature dishes based on their point of view. They had two hours to cook and once the cooking was complete, they had to do a two-minute demo to camera.
  - Winner: Whitney (Gazpacho)
- Star Challenge: Bobby Flay arrives at the finalists' house and announces their star challenge: create a meal for Wolfgang Puck and the Selection Committee. The chefs were to cook at the house, and were limited to items in their pantry and refrigerator. Whitney, as the Camera Challenge winner, assigned everyone a specific course to cook. Penny and Mary Beth were selected to shop for their table settings. They were met at the store by designer Sabrina Soto, who provided tips on how to select table settings.
  - Winner: None
  - Eliminated: Chris (Chocolate Fudge Cake with Tahitian Creme Anglaise) and Penny (Sauteed Prawns over Baby Arugula and Figs)

Original Air Date: July 17, 2011

=== Week Eight: Ina Garten and Rachael Ray ===
- Camera Challenge: The finalists left Los Angeles and went to New York City. Once they arrived, they went to Chelsea Market, and were greeted by Ina Garten. She presented them a coconut and almond cupcake that each contestant had to remake using their point of view. Once cooking was complete, they presented to camera and the Selection Committee.
  - Winners: Jyll (Chocolate-Orange Cupcake) and Mary Beth (Roasted Strawberry Cupcake)
- Star Challenge: All the finalists were going to be on The Rachael Ray Show. They were given a classic American dish and had to remake it with a modern twist. The day before they were going to be on the show, they prepared their dishes in the Food Network Kitchen. On the day of presentation they were greeted by Rachael Ray. She told them that they had to do a 30-second opening designed to entice possible viewers. They also had to do a 3-minute demo while answering an audience member's question.
  - Winner: Jeff (Braised Pork Sandwich with Slaw, Gorgonzola Spread and Sweet Potato Chips)
  - Eliminated: Jyll (Meatloaf, Mashed Potatoes and Roasted Vegetables)

Original Air Date: July 24, 2011

=== Week Nine: Comedy Roast ===
- Camera Challenge: The contestants searched Chelsea Market, sampling different food to describe for a segment of The Best Thing I Ever Ate. Each chef made a selection, then presented that dish to camera, directed by Bobby Flay. None of the contestants prepared any food.
  - Winner: Jeff (Reuben Sandwich with Gruyere Cheese and Russian Dressing)
- Star Challenge: The contestants had to prepare a traditional roast, which they would serve to the Selection Committee and a group of stand-up comics, while being roasted themselves. Jeff as the winner of the Camera Challenge, assigned his fellow contestants the roast they would prepare. Guest comedians included: Louie Anderson, Gilbert Gottfried, Judy Gold, Anthony Anderson and Aubrey Plaza.
  - Winner: Jeff (Italian Beef Sandwich with Suet-Fried Chips and Jardinera)
  - Eliminated: Whitney (Roasted Pork with Greens Stuffing and Roasted Tomatoes)

Original Air Date: July 31, 2011

=== Week Ten: Iron Chef ===
- Camera Challenge: None
- Star Challenge: The contestants were divided into pairs to be pitted against each other in an Iron Chef America competition, completing three dishes within an hour. Jeff, as the winner of the last challenge, was allowed to pick who he would go up against – Susie. The contestants were also assisted by a former finalist as sous chef: Jeff with Whitney, Susie with Chris, Mary Beth with Penny and Vic with Jyll. The contestants were asked to judge their opponent's dishes and to provide kitchen-side commentary during the battle they were not participating in. Vic and Mary Beth's secret ingredient was rack of lamb while Susie and Jeff's was lobster.
  - Winners: Susie (Lobster Ceviche, Lobster Enchilada in Swiss Chard & Lobster Stew over Potato Cake) and Vic (Seared Loin of Lamb with Arugula Salad, Lamb Burger with French Fries & Broiled Lamb Chop with Mint-Grand Marnier Glaze)
  - Eliminated: Mary Beth (Grilled Lamb Chop with Israeli Couscous, Pan-Cooked Lamb Chop with Fall Pears & "Umami Explosion" Roast Lamb Chop with Roast Tomatoes)

Original Air Date: August 7, 2011

=== Week Eleven: Cook for Your Life and Pilots ===
- Camera Challenge: The finalists had two hours to cook the best dish of their life. Once cooking was complete, they had one minute to present to camera. Once everyone presented, one finalist was eliminated; a first in Food Network Star history.
  - Winner: Susie (Pork Carnitas with Grilled Cactus Salad)
  - Eliminated: Vic (Zuppa di Pesce)
- Star Challenge: The two finalists joined Guy Fieri to film their pilots. They had four tries and had to be sure to have a story behind their dish and demonstrate how to make the dish. Once filming was complete, they presented their pilots to the Selection Committee, and a focus group made up of previously eliminated contestants.
  - Runner-Up: Susie
  - The Next Food Network Star: Jeff
  - New Show: Sandwich King - premiered on Sunday, August 21, 2011, at 11:30/10:30c AM

Original Air Date: August 14, 2011
