= The Next Food Network Star season 6 =

The Next Food Network Star
- Season 6
- No. of contestants: 12
- Winner: Aarti Sequeira
- No. of episodes: 10

Release
- Original network: Food Network
- Original release: June 6 – August 15, 2010

Season chronology
- ← Previous; Season 5 Next → Season 7

The sixth season of the American reality television series The Next Food Network Star premiered on Sunday, June 6, 2010. Food Network executives, Bob Tuschman and Susie Fogelson, were joined again by Bobby Flay as the judges for this season. In addition, Giada De Laurentiis will serve as an on-set mentor. The series was filmed in Los Angeles, California and New York, New York. Winner Aarti Sequeira went on to host her show Aarti Party, which premiered on August 22, 2010. Runner-up Tom Pizzica was also hired to host a travel food show Outrageous Food, which began airing in November 2010.

== Contestants ==
=== Eliminated ===
(In order of elimination)

- Alexis Hernandez – Union City, New Jersey
- Doreen Fang – Los Angeles, California
- Dzintra Dzenis – Austin, Texas
- Darrell (DAS) Smith – Los Angeles, California
- Paul Young – Chicago, Illinois
- Brianna Jenkins – Atlanta, Georgia
- Serena Palumbo – New York, New York
- Brad Sorenson – Austin, Texas
- Aria Kagan – Hollywood, Florida

=== Runners-up ===
- Tom Pizzica – San Francisco, California
- Herb Mesa – Atlanta, Georgia

=== Winner ===
- Aarti Sequeira – Los Angeles, California

== Contestant progress ==
Contestant	1	2	3	4	5	6	7	8	9	10
Camera; Challenge; Winner	Aria; Herb	None	Aarti	Brianna	Aarti; Tom	Brad; Tom	Aarti	Aria	N/A	N/A
Aarti	IN	WIN	HIGH	WIN	HIGH	LOW	WIN	LOW	WIN	WINNER
Herb	IN	IN	WIN	LOW	IN	LOW	LOW	HIGH	LOW	RUNNER-UP
Tom	IN	IN	IN	IN	HIGH	IN	LOW	WIN	WIN	RUNNER-UP
Aria	WIN	HIGH	LOW	WIN	LOW	IN	LOW	LOW	OUT	
Brad	IN	IN	HIGH	WIN	LOW	WIN	HIGH	OUT		
Serena	IN	HIGH	LOW	LOW	WIN	IN	OUT			
Brianna	IN	IN	WIN	IN	WIN	OUT				
Paul	IN	LOW	LOW	IN	OUT					
DAS	LOW	HIGH	IN	OUT						
Dzintra	IN	LOW	OUT							
Doreen	LOW	OUT								
Alexis	OUT									

(WINNER) The contestant won the competition and became "The Next Food Network Star".
(RUNNER-UP) The contestant made it to the finale, but did not win.
(WIN) The contestant won that episode's Star Challenge.
(HIGH) The contestant was one of the Selection Committee's favorites for that week, but did not win the Star Challenge.
(IN) The contestant was not one of the Selection Committee's favorites nor their least favorites. They were not up for elimination.
(LOW) The contestant was one of the Selection Committee's three or four least favorites for that week, but was not eliminated.
(LOW) The contestant was one of the Selection Committee's two least favorites for that week, but was not eliminated.
(OUT) The contestant was the Selection Committee's least favorite for that week, and was eliminated.

== Episodes ==
=== Week 1: Welcome to Los Angeles! ===
- Camera Challenge: The finalists must present themselves on a plate, using chicken and potatoes, then do a 30-second camera demo.
  - Winners: Aria and Herb
- Star Challenge: The finalists are divided into two teams with Aria (Grey Team) and Herb (Black Team) as captains. Each team must cater a six-course lunch for celebrity chef Wolfgang Puck in the style of California cooking. Before the cooking, they film a 15-second promo for their show, to be presented at the lunch.
  - Winners: Grey Team (Aria, Aarti, Brianna, Paul, Tom, Dzintra) [Dzintra did not compete; she was taken to the emergency room with a shard in her eye, and ordered to stay out of the kitchen.]
  - Winner: Aria (Santa Barbara Olive Focaccia with Baked Goat Cheese)
  - Eliminated: Alexis (Beignets with Rosemary Caramel and Local Honey)

Original Air Date: June 6, 2010

=== Week 2: Sweet to Savory Carnival ===
- Camera Challenge: Using Giada's recipe for vegetable lasagne, each contestant had one minute to demo a step to camera.
  - Winner: None
- Star Challenge: Using a carnival fortune telling machine, chef Duff Goldman assigns each contestant a typical carnival sweet, which they must reinterpret as a savory dish, to be served to 100 guests at a party on the Santa Monica Pier.
  - Winner: Aarti (Funnel Cake as Chicken in Tandoori Barbecue Sauce on a Scallion Potato Pancake)
  - Eliminated: Doreen (Root Beer Float as Root Beer Pulled Pork with Jalapeño Crème Fraîche)

Original Air Date: June 13, 2010

=== Week 3: Grammy Awards Celebration ===
- Camera Challenge: Each chef must create a dish inspired by a movie genre drawn from a box of popcorn and present the dish to camera.
  - Winner: Aarti
- Star Challenge: Guy Fieri sends each contestant down a simulated red carpet to see how they relate to the camera and fans. Later, each chef selects a "swag" bag that contains a secret ingredient. The chefs are paired based on the colors of their bags, and must prepare a dish using on their own ingredient and a collaborative dish using both ingredients, to be served at the post-Grammy party featuring Colbie Caillat.
  - Winners: Brianna and Herb (Combined: Fennel and Leek Bruschetta with Cheese and Beer Fondue; Herb: MGD 64 Flank Steak; Brianna: Crispy Pork Loin with Fennel Tomato Chutney)
  - Eliminated: Dzintra (Mom's Mushroom Beef Tenderloin)

Original Air Date: June 20, 2010

=== Week 4: Spicy Competition ===
- Camera Challenge: Each chef must select a different chile and cook a dish, to be presented to camera, that best presents that chile.
  - Winner: Brianna
- Star Challenge: Groups of three chefs are assigned to a guest chef: Susan Feniger, Jonathan Waxman or Eric Greenspan, and must compete head-to-head to most successfully reinvent the best dish their assigned chef ever ate.
  - Winners: Aarti (Waxman's Lamb and Potatoes Reinvented as Lamb Kabobs), Brad (Feniger's Fried Chicken and Green Salad Reinvented as Double-Fried Chicken with Light Green Salad) and Aria (Greenspan's Steak with Macaroni and Cheese Reinvented as Fajitas with Mac and Cheese) [It was noted in judging that Aria won on the strength of her presentation rather than her food.]
  - Eliminated: DAS (Steak with Tri-Berry Sauce and Macaroni and Cheese)

Original Air Date: June 27, 2010

=== Week 5: Lunch Trucks with Paula ===
- Camera Challenge: The contestants had to make their own product to present live to an audience and to a camera in three minutes. After they made the product and before they presented, Giada De Laurentiis, told them what they should do the next day to advance and win the challenge.
  - Winners: Aarti and Tom
- Star Challenge: The contestants are paired up, and Paula Deen presents the challenge: develop a four-item menu to be served out of a lunch truck. The teams must select a suitable name for their truck, then open for business at lunch time along Venice Beach.
  - Winners: Brianna and Serena (Two Chicks and a Truck)
  - Eliminated: Paul

Original Air Date: July 11, 2010

=== Week 6: Retro Palm Springs ===
- Camera Challenge: The contestants are assigned a picnic basket containing three ingredients, and assigned an event. Using the ingredients, they must make a small bite appropriate to the event.
  - Winners: Brad and Tom
- Star Challenge: The contestants were sent to the former Palm Springs residence of Frank Sinatra to cook and present a modernized version of a classic dish from the 1950s and 1960s.
  - Winner: Brad (Chicken Cordon Bleu)
  - Eliminated: Brianna (Tuna Casserole)

Original Air Date: July 18, 2010

=== Week 7: Secret Supper Club ===
- Camera Challenge: Melissa D'Arabian joined the contestants to present an array of breakfast cereals. Each was assigned a cereal, and given 20 minutes, the timeline of a busy working mother, to create a dinner.
  - Winner: Aarti
- Star Challenge: As camera challenge winner, Aarti led the team as they prepared a six-course dinner for a group of foodies, including chefs and restaurant owners at "Smog Shoppe", the location for an underground supper club meeting.
  - Winner: Aarti (Green Curry Chicken)
  - Eliminated: Serena (Pasta Alla Norma)

Original Air Date: July 25, 2010

=== Week 8: Cooking For Eva Longoria ===
- Camera Challenge: Giada De Laurentiis asked each contestant to cook a dish using their point of view. She then interrupted them and asked them to incorporate their least favorite ingredient to their dish. They then brought the relatives of each contestant to hand them the ingredient.
  - Winner: Aria
- Star Challenge: The contestants were sent to the restaurant Beso (owned by Todd English and Eva Longoria) in Hollywood. They were all assigned an emotion, and they were asked to prepare a dish to represent that emotion. Each chef had $300 to shop and one hour to prepare in the Food Star Kitchen. At Beso, they had 30 minutes before presenting. The final four move on to New York.
  - Winner: Tom
  - Eliminated: Brad

Original Air Date: August 1, 2010

=== Week 9: Iron Chef Battle ===
- Camera Challenge: None
- Star Challenge: The contestants were sent to New York to participate in an Iron Chef America battle. They were judged by both the usual panel and a panel of Iron Chefs on both the overall quality of their meal and their ability in commentating on the preparation of their peers' meals. The final three move on to the finale episode where they will each film their own pilot episode.
  - Winners: Aarti (Secret Ingredient: Shrimp), Tom (Secret Ingredient: Bacon)
  - Eliminated: Aria (Secret Ingredient: Bacon)

Original Air Date: August 8, 2010

=== Week 10: Rachael Ray Directs ===
- Camera Challenge: None
- Star Challenge: The final three were directed by Rachael Ray in creating their own pilots for the show that they would want to host on Food Network.
  - Runners-Up: Tom and Herb
  - The Next Food Network Star: Aarti
  - New Show: Aarti Party

Original Air Date: August 15, 2010
