= Halloween Wars =

American food reality television series

- Genre: Reality television Cooking show
- Presented by: Justin Willman (2011–2014); Jonathan Bennett (2016–2020, 2023-present); Zak Bagans (2021–2022)
- Judges: Shinmin Li (2011–present); Miles Teves (2011); Tom Savini (2012); Brian Kinney (2013–2015); Don Mancini (2016); Todd Tucker (2017–2020); Eddie Jackson (2021–2022); Aarti Sequeira (2021–present)
- Country of origin: United States
- Original language: English
- No. of seasons: 13
- No. of episodes: 60 (list of episodes)

Original release
- Network: Food Network
- Release: October 2, 2011 – present

Halloween Wars is an American reality competition series from Super Delicious, the production company that also produces Cupcake Wars and Cake Wars. It premiered on October 2, 2011, on Food Network and it runs over the course of four weeks in October annually. The show pits five teams made up of cake sculptors, sugar artists, and pumpkin carvers against each other to produce the ultimate Halloween themed display. The winning team is awarded $50,000. For season 13 and 14, the winning team is awarded $25,000.

The series was hosted by Justin Willman (seasons 1–4), Rossi Morreale (season 5), Jonathan Bennett (seasons 6-10, 13-15), and for seasons 11 and 12, hosted by paranormal investigator Zak Bagans from Ghost Adventures.

== Rounds ==
Each episode has two rounds. The first round is the "Small Scare" where the teams of trios get 45 minutes to create their interpretation of a spooky theme (ex: "possessed electronics" or "zombie dolls"). The winners of the first round get an extra assistant for the second round (starting in season three, winners of the final episode "Small Scare" round get first pick of the pumpkins).

The second round is the "Spine Chiller" where the teams get five hours to create a large-scale, immersive sculpture based on a new theme. They must also serve a tasting element that usually have something to do with the theme. The themes for the second round relate to the title of each episode (such as "Zombies vs. Vampires", where the teams had to create a scene depicting a zombie battling a vampire using cake, candy, and pumpkin).

== Judges ==
There are three judges in the series, with two of them serving as permanent judges in seasons 1-10. Throughout the series award-winning cake artist Shinmin Li served as permanent judge. Hollywood conceptual artist Miles Teves was the second judge in season 1. Actor and award-winning special effects artist Tom Savini was the second judge in season 2. Emmy-nominated SFX make-up artist Brian Kinney was the second judge in seasons 3–5. Writer/director of Child's Play, Don Mancini joined Shinmin in season 6. Director and effects artist Todd Tucker was the male judge in seasons 7–10. Starting in season 11, Food Network Star winner Aarti Sequeira serves as permanent judges along with Shinmin. For Seasons 11-12, Eddie Jackson served as a co-host along with paranormal activity hunter Zak Bagans. In Season 13, Bennett returned to the show as the host.

In addition to the two regular judges throughout seasons 1-10, each episode had a third special guest judge that is involved in horror, whether as an actor, a writer, etc.

== Episodes ==
Season	Season premiere date	Season finale date	No. of teams	Judge 1	Judge 2	Judge 3
1	October 2, 2011	October 23, 2011	5	Shinmin Li	Miles Teves	Guest Judges
2	October 7, 2012	October 28, 2012	5	Shinmin Li	Tom Savini	Guest Judges
3	October 6, 2013	October 27, 2013	5	Shinmin Li	Brian Kinney	Guest Judges
4	October 5, 2014	October 26, 2014	5	Shinmin Li	Brian Kinney	Guest Judges
5	October 4, 2015	October 25, 2015	5	Shinmin Li	Brian Kinney	Guest Judges
6	October 2, 2016	October 30, 2016	6	Shinmin Li	Don Mancini	Guest Judges
7	October 1, 2017	October 29, 2017	6	Shinmin Li	Todd Tucker	Guest Judges
8	September 30, 2018	October 28, 2018	6	Shinmin Li	Todd Tucker	Guest Judges
9	September 29, 2019	October 27, 2019	6	Shinmin Li	Todd Tucker	Guest Judges
10	September 13, 2020	October 11, 2020	6	Shinmin Li	Todd Tucker	Guest Judges
11	September 19, 2021	October 31, 2021	8	Shinmin Li	Eddie Jackson	Guest Judges
12	September 18, 2022	October 30, 2022	9	Shinmin Li	Eddie Jackson	Guest Judges
13	September 17, 2023	October 29, 2023	9	Shinmin Li	Aarti Sequeira	Guest Judges
14	September 22, 2024	October 27, 2024	8	Shinmin Li	Aarti Sequeira	Guest Judges
