= Adjudicator =

Someone who presides, judges and arbitrates during a formal dispute

An adjudicator is someone who presides, judges, and arbitrates during a formal dispute or competition. They have numerous purposes, including preliminary legal judgments, to determine applicant eligibility, or to assess contenders' performance in competitions.

== Types ==
=== Administrative law ===
In American administrative law, government agencies in the executive branch of the federal government often engage in a quasi-judicial activity known as adjudication: "an agency action with the force of law that resolves a claim or dispute between specific individuals in a specific case". Americans distinguish between formal adjudication presided over by administrative law judges (ALJs), "a special class of adjudicators" appointed pursuant to the Administrative Procedure Act (APA), and informal adjudication presided over by a variety of officials who are not ALJs.

The original intent of the APA's drafters was that it would cover nearly all agency adjudications, but that objective was never achieved. During the 1980s, one reason for why many agencies started to get away with conducting informal adjudications outside the APA with non-ALJ officials is that they exploited the broad deference afforded to their interpretation of their governing statutes by Chevron U.S.A., Inc. v. Natural Resources Defense Council, Inc. (1984).

For lack of a better term, the non-ALJ officials who conduct such informal adjudications are sometimes referred to as "non-ALJ adjudicators" or "non-ALJs". Since the early 1990s, non-ALJ adjudicators have greatly outnumbered ALJs. A 2018 study found that there were approximately 1,931 ALJs and 10,831 non-ALJ adjudicators. The study identified 37 different types of non-ALJ adjudicators sharing 23 titles (e.g., multiple agencies use the term "Hearing Officer").

The dramatic shift towards non-ALJ adjudicators and away from ALJs has been blamed on ALJs' much higher salaries, as well as rigid federal civil service rules for ALJ positions that prevent agency executives from hiring a non-veteran candidate with litigation experience directly related to an agency's governing statute over a veteran candidate whose prior litigation experience has no connection to the agency. The civil service rules also make it nearly impossible to fire incompetent ALJs.

Among the more prominent examples of non-ALJ adjudicators who operate outside of the formal adjudication provisions of the APA are immigration judges of the Executive Office for Immigration Review (EOIR) of the United States Department of Justice and the administrative judges of the Equal Employment Opportunity Commission (EEOC). However, as of 2018, the bulk of non-ALJ adjudicators consisted of the 7,856 patent examiners of the United States Patent and Trademark Office, who vastly outnumbered EOIR's 326 immigration judges and the EEOC's 87 administrative judges.

=== Official evaluations ===
An adjudicator (often referred to as a "judge", "umpire", "arbiter", or more archaically as a "daysman"), is a person who gives a critical evaluation of performances in competitions, festivals or talent shows, resulting in the award of marks, medals or prizes.

In British Parliamentary Style debate, an adjudicator weighs arguments and decides rankings in the house. There are different types of adjudicators, each with their respective duties and levels of authority: chair, panelist, and trainee. In the event that the chair is the chief adjudicator of the tournament, they are referred to as "Speaker".

== Sources ==
- Adjudicators Field Manual, United States Department of Homeland Security, Citizenship and Immigration Services
