= Scott Conant =

American chef

- Born: February 19, 1971 (age 55); Waterbury, Connecticut, U.S.
- Education: Culinary Institute of America
- Spouse: Meltem Bozkurt Conant (m. 2007)
- Children: 2
- Culinary career
- Cooking style: Italian
- Current restaurants: Cellaio Steak; The Americano Scottsdale; The Americano Atlanta
- Previous restaurants: L'Impero, Manhattan (2002–2007); Alto, Manhattan (2004–2007); Fusco, Manhattan (2017–2018); Scarpetta Restaurants (2008-2017); Mora Italian (2017-2024)
- Television shows: 24 Hour Restaurant Battle; Chopped; Chopped Sweets; Top Chef; Beat Bobby Flay
- Awards won: James Beard Foundation's "Best New Restaurant" and "Best Restaurant Design" for L'Impero, 2003; Food & Wine Magazine's "Best New Chef," 2004
- Website: scottconant.com

Scott Conant (born February 19, 1971) is an American celebrity chef, restaurateur, and cookbook author. Since 2009, Conant has been a judge on the reality cooking television series Chopped. He has published four cookbooks.

== Early life ==
Conant was born in Waterbury, Connecticut, where he grew up. He is the son of Charles and Anne (née Varrone) Conant. His maternal grandparents were Italian-Americans, and he enjoyed visiting their house on Marton Street in Waterbury on Sundays with his parents and siblings. He loved his grandmother's Italian cooking, and still has fond memories of her backyard garden, which provided freshly-grown tomatoes and basil for her tomato sauce.

Conant began cooking at a young age, taking cooking classes at the local community college at age 11. At 15, he enrolled in W.F. Kaynor Technical High School for culinary arts, and then attended the Culinary Institute of America (CIA).

== Professional career ==
While at the Culinary Institute of America, Conant interned at the famous New York City restaurant San Domenico, an experience that had a decisive impact on the young chef. After graduation, he spent a year in Munich, Germany, mastering the art of pastry at the Hotel Bayerischer Hof. He returned to the United States and San Domenico, working as a sous chef. In 1995, Cesare Casella selected him to be chef de cuisine at Il Toscanaccio, an Upper East Side Tuscan-style restaurant. He later became executive chef at City Eatery, located on the Bowery in New York City.

In September 2002, Conant opened L'Impero in Tudor City. Within weeks, the restaurant received a rave three-star review from The New York Times, which stated, "[Conant is] turning out dishes full of flavors that are joyous and highly refined. From the simplest preparations to the most complex, he is almost always in control and in tune." Conant's signature pastas appeared on the cover of Food & Wine, and the magazine went on to name Conant one of America's "Best New Chefs" in 2004.

L'Impero received top honors from the James Beard Foundation in 2003, including “Best New Restaurant” in the U.S. and “Outstanding Restaurant Design.”

In October 2003, Conant was featured on the cover of Gourmet for its “Chefs Rock” issue, and in March 2004, Gourmet editor Ruth Reichl named L'Impero one of her favorite New York restaurants. Following L'Impero, Conant went on to open Alto, a "sophisticated" Italian restaurant in midtown Manhattan that offered his interpretation of Northern Italian cuisine.

Conant left L'Impero and Alto in 2007 and, in 2008, opened Scarpetta in Chelsea, Manhattan. In July 2008, the restaurant garnered a positive three-star review from The New York Times and New York Magazine.

While no longer affiliated, Conant went on to build the Scarpetta brand to national acclaim with restaurants in New York City, Miami, Toronto, Los Angeles, and Las Vegas and published The Scarpetta Cookbook, inspired by dishes from the restaurant.

In July 2010, the reality food-competition television show 24 Hour Restaurant Battle premiered on the Food Network, starring Conant as the host and head judge. The television show pits two teams of two people against each other as they open up a restaurant from scratch in 24 hours. The show ran two seasons.

In 2021, Conant released his fourth cookbook, Peace, Love, and Pasta: Simple and Elegant Recipes from a Chef's Home Kitchen.

== Personal life ==
Conant has been married to his wife, Meltem (née Bozkurt) since 2007. The couple have two daughters.

== Filmography ==
Television
Year	Title	Role	Notes
2006	After Hours with Daniel Boulud.	Himself	Episode: "Blue Ribbon Sushi."
2007, 2009	Top Chef	Guest Judge	2 episodes
2009–present	Chopped	Self – Judge	220 episodes
2010	Anthony Bourdain: No Reservations	Himself	Episode: "Techniques Special"
2010–2011	24 Hour Restaurant Battle	Host	5 episodes
2010–2019	The Best Thing I Ever Ate	Himself	18 episodes
2011	Entourage	Himself	Episode: "The Big Bang"
2011	Food(ography)	Himself – Chef and owner of D.O.C.G	Episode: "Las Vegas"
2011–2012	Food Network Star	Himself / Judge	2 episodes
2011–2012	The Best Thing I Ever Made	Himself	7 episodes
2012	Symon's Suppers	Himself	Episode: "Sunday Suppers"
2012	Ali 70 from Las Vegas	Himself	TV special
2012	Ten Dollar Dinners	Himself	Episode: "Scarpetta Swap Out"
2012	Sandra's Restaurant Remakes	Himself – Chef and owner of D.O.C.G.	Episode: "Rich and Dreamy Dishes"
2012	Iron Chef America	Himself - Team Chopped	Episode: "Thanksgiving Showdown: Thanksgiving Leftovers"
2012–2014	Rachael vs. Guy: Celebrity Cook-Off	Himself / Judge	2 episodes
2014	Southern Fried Everything	Himself - Cookbook Author	Episode: "The Sounds of Sizzle"
2014	Rewrapped	Himself / Judge	Episode: "Lay's It All on the Line"
2014–2016	Chopped After Hours	Himself / Judge	11 episodes
2014–Present	Beat Bobby Flay	Himself / Mentor / Judge	38 episodes
2015	The Da Vinci List	Himself	Episode: "The Da Vinci List: Chefs"
2015	Rachael Ray's Kids Cook-Off	Himself / Judge	Episode: "Grand Finale Cook Off"
2015	Christmas at Bobby's	Himself	Christmas special
2015–2017	Chopped Junior	Himself / Judge	9 episodes
2016	Burgers, Brew and 'Que	Himself	Episode: "Sweet and Savory"
2016	Emeril's Florida	Himself	Episode: "Resort Restaurants"
2016	All-Star Academy	Himself – Guest professor	Episode: "Snack Time"
2016	Brunch at Bobby's	Himself	Episode: "Updated Manhattan"
2016–2017	Cooks vs. Cons	Himself / Judge	4 episodes
2017–2019	Worst Cooks in America	Himself / Chef / Judge	2 episodes
2018	Guy's Ranch Kitchen	Himself	Episode: "Healthy Comfort"
2019	Best Baker in America	Host	Episode: "Extra Icing: Classic French Pastries Reinvented"
2020	All-Star Best Thing I Ever Ate	Himself	3 episodes
2020	Chopped Sweets	Host	6 episodes
2021–Present	Tournament of Champions	Judge	Episode: "The Bracket Begins"
2025	House of Knives	Host / Judge	8 episodes

== Awards ==
- Three Stars from The New York Times for "L'Impero" and "Scarpetta New York"
- Four Stars from Miami Herald for "Scarpetta Miami"
- "Best New Restaurant of 2003" from the James Beard Foundation for "L'Impero"
- "Best New Chef" from Food & Wine Magazine in 2004
- Winner of Season 3 of "Chopped All-Stars"

== Cookbooks ==
- Scott Conant's New Italian Cooking (2005), ISBN 0-7679-1682-4
- Bold Italian (2008), ISBN 978-0-7679-1683-7
- The Scarpetta Cookbook (2013), ISBN 978-1118508701
- Peace, Love, & Pasta (2021), ISBN 1419747363
