= Martie Duncan =

American cook, blogger and party planner

- Born: Birmingham, Alabama, U.S.
- Website: www.martieknowsparties.com

Martie Duncan is an American chef, blogger and party planner. She was a finalist on the eighth season of the Food Network series Food Network Star.

== Career ==
Duncan has made several appearances on The Oprah Winfrey Show. She has had no formal culinary training, nor has she ever worked in a restaurant. Duncan is the president of her own party-planning company, M Content Media LLC.

In 2012, Duncan became a contestant on the eighth season of the Food Network series Food Network Star, being mentored by Alton Brown. She became one of the final four contestants, eventually losing to Justin Warner. On May 31, 2014, it was announced that she would be a contestant on the Food Network Star spin-off webseries Star Salvation, which gave eliminated contestants a chance to re-enter the Food Network Star competition. Duncan was eliminated from Star Salvation in the second episode of the season.

== Personal life ==
Duncan was born in Birmingham, Alabama. Duncan initially did not reveal her age, simply billing herself on Food Network Star as "slightly over 40"; however, she gave her age as 50 on the July 15, 2012 episode.
