= The Next Food Network Star season 5 =

The Next Food Network Star
- Season 5
- No. of contestants: 10
- Winner: Melissa d'Arabian
- No. of episodes: 9

Release
- Original network: Food Network
- Original release: June 7 – August 2, 2009

Additional information
- Filming dates: February 2009 – March 2009

Season chronology
- ← Previous; Season 4 Next → Season 6

The fifth season of the American reality television series The Next Food Network Star premiered on Sunday, June 7, 2009. Food Network executives, Bob Tuschman and Susie Fogelson, were joined by Bobby Flay as the Selection Committee for this season, which was filmed early 2009 in New York, New York and Miami, Florida.

Melissa d'Arabian was the winner.

== Contestants ==
=== Eliminated ===
(In order of elimination)

- Jen Isham, 30 - Orlando, Florida; Sales Manager; (Culinary Point of View: Inexpensive, Pre-Planned Meals)
- Brett August, 32 - New York, New York; Executive Sous Chef (Culinary Point of View: Italian-American Cuisine)
- Eddie Gilbert, 30 - Los Angeles, California; Apprentice Chef (Culinary Point of View: Modernized Traditional Dishes)
- Teddy Folkman, 33 - Alexandria, Virginia; Restaurant Owner & Executive Chef (Culinary Point of View: Gourmet Bar Food)
- Katie Cavuto, 30 - Philadelphia, Pennsylvania; Personal Chef & Nutritionist (Culinary Point of View: Healthy and Sustainable Mediterranean Cuisine)
- Michael Proietti, 28 - City Island, New York; Executive Chef (Culinary Point of View: "Global A Go-Go")
- Jamika Pessoa, 30 - Atlanta, Georgia; Personal Chef & Businesswoman (Culinary Point of View: Caribbean Cuisine)
- Debbie Lee, 39 - West Hollywood, California; Restaurant Consultant (Culinary Point of View: "From Seoul to Soul")

=== Runner-Up ===
- Jeffrey Saad, 42 - Los Angeles, California; Restaurant Owner, Chef & Food Consultant (Culinary Point of View: "Cooking without Borders")

=== Winner ===
- Melissa d'Arabian, 40 - Keller, Texas; Stay-at-Home Mom (Culinary Point of View: Family Cooking)

== Contestant Progress ==
Episode	1	2	3	4	5	6	7	8	9
Mini; Challenge; Winner	N/A	Eddie	Jeffrey	Michael	None	Jeffrey	Debbie	N/A	N/A
Melissa	HIGH	HIGH	IN	WIN	IN	IN	IN	IN	WINNER
Jeffrey	WIN	IN	WIN	LOW	IN	IN	WIN	IN	RUNNER-UP
Debbie	IN	HIGH	IN	HIGH	IN	LOW	IN	OUT	
Jamika	IN	WIN	IN	LOW	LOW	IN	OUT		
Michael	HIGH	IN	WIN	HIGH	LOW	OUT			
Katie	IN	LOW	IN	LOW	OUT				
Teddy	IN	IN	LOW	OUT					
Eddie	LOW	LOW	OUT						
Brett	LOW	OUT							
Jen	OUT								

(WINNER) The contestant won the competition and became "The Next Food Network Star".
(RUNNER-UP) The contestant made it to the finale, but did not win.
(WIN) The contestant won that episode's Main Challenge.
(HIGH) The contestant was one of the Selection Committee's favorites for that week, but did not win the Main Challenge.
(IN) The contestant was not one of the Selection Committee's favorites nor their least favorites. They were not up for elimination.
(LOW) The contestant was one of the Selection Committee's three or four least favorites for that week, but was not eliminated.
(LOW) The contestant was one of the Selection Committee's two least favorites for that week, but was not eliminated.
(OUT) The contestant was the Selection Committee's least favorite for that week, and was eliminated.

== Episodes ==
=== Week 1: Press Party for Food Network's 16th Birthday ===
- Mini Challenge: None
- Main Challenge: Upon arriving in the Food Network Kitchens in New York City, the ten finalists are greeted by the Selection Committee, consisting of Food Network executives Bob Tuschman and Susie Fogelson, as well as celebrity chef and television personality Bobby Flay. Bobby informs the finalists that they will be catering a press party to celebrate Food Network's 16th year on the air. He randomly splits them into two teams, Team Green (Brett, Jamika, Jen, Melissa and Teddy) and Team Red (Debbie, Eddie, Jeffrey, Katie and Michael). Each team is given $1,200 to shop at Whole Foods Market, as well as five hours to prep and cook their dishes for the 75 guests at the party, including many Food Network stars and the Selection Committee. Then, each contestant must give a short presentation about themselves and their dish to the guests, and must participate in a short interview with Access Hollywood co-host Nancy O'Dell.
  - Winner: Jeffrey
  - Eliminated: Jen

Original Air Date: June 7, 2009

=== Week 2: Holidays with Giada ===
- Mini Challenge: The nine remaining finalists arrive in the Food Network Kitchens, where Bobby Flay and Esquire Magazine's articles editor Ryan D'Agostino greet them and tell them they must create a recipe for the Esquire man that works for the magazine's "Recipe for Men" section. They each have 45 minutes to cook an inventive dish using ingredients typically found in an Esquire man's pantry- a cut of meat and a special ingredient such as pickles, maraschino cherries, or whiskey. Then, they have one minute to explain their dish in a direct-to-camera presentation, with the Selection Committee watching. The winner's recipe will be featured in the magazine.
  - Winner: Eddie
- Main Challenge: The finalists head to the Good Housekeeping Magazine test kitchen in the Hearst Tower, where they are greeted by Giada De Laurentiis and Good Housekeeping's editor-in-chief, Rosemary Ellis. Giada tells them that they will each have to create a simple and creative interpretation of a meal to celebrate a certain holiday. Eddie, as the winner of the previous challenge, must pick the previously chosen holidays and assign them to himself and his fellow competitors.
  - Brett – April Fool's Day
  - Debbie – Mardi Gras
  - Eddie – Valentine's Day
  - Jamika – New Year's Eve
  - Jeffrey – Groundhog Day
  - Katie – Earth Day
  - Melissa – Mothers' Day
  - Michael – Halloween
  - Teddy – Labor Day
- After cooking, the contestants must serve and present their dishes to the Selection Committee, Giada De Laurentiis, Rosemary Ellis, and Good Housekeeping executive Susan Westmoreland. The challenge winner will have one of their recipes featured in Good Housekeeping's July issue.
  - Winner: Jamika
  - Eliminated: Brett

Original Air Date: June 14, 2009

=== Week 3: Dinner at Ina's ===
- Mini Challenge: The eight remaining finalists meet Tyler Florence at a Stew Leonard's supermarket in Yonkers. He tells them they must shop for a family dinner for 12 with only $60 and 30 minutes to shop. During this half-hour, they must also stop by Tyler and present a money-saving tip to the camera.
  - Winner: Jeffrey
- Main Challenge: The next day, the finalists head to the Hamptons to visit Ina Garten in her home. She splits them into pairs (Jamika and Katie, Eddie and Melissa, Teddy and Debbie, Jeffrey and Michael) and tells them each team must work together to create a lavish three-course meal for Ina and her friends, as well as the Selection Committee, using the ingredients they purchased in the Mini Challenge. Each individual in the team must create one of the three courses, while the third one must be a collaboration between the two team members.
  - Winners: Jeffrey and Michael
  - Eliminated: Eddie

Original Air Date: June 21, 2009

=== Week 4: The Ultimate American Meal ===
- Mini Challenge: Bobby Flay tests the remaining seven finalists by having them put their culinary point of view on a classic American dish – the burger! The finalists must whip up their ideal burger while sharing personal stories and their connections to their dish. The best burger lands a place on the menu of Bobby's new restaurant venture Bobby's Burger Palace.
  - Winner: Michael
- Main Challenge: Guy Fieri and USA WEEKEND Magazine associate editor, TJ Walter, surprise the finalists on the Intrepid Sea, Air & Space Museum, challenging each of them to create a dish using a basket of international ingredients for a group of returning American soldiers. The winner learns that his or her recipe will be featured on the July 3–5th cover of USA WEEKEND Magazine, and another finalist is eliminated.
  - Winner: Melissa
  - Eliminated: Teddy

Original Air Date: June 28, 2009

=== Week 5: Rachael Ray ===
- Mini Challenge: The remaining six finalists prepare an "adult" dish that would appeal to kids, such as squid or tofu. They will present to the Selection Committee and three random kids.
  - Winner: None
- Main Challenge: The finalists participate on the Rachael Ray Show, where they pair up and do a live presentation on the show. Their dishes must add an "adult" twist on a "kid" dish.
  - Winner: None
  - Eliminated: Katie

Original Air Date: July 5, 2009

=== Week 6: Miami Up All Night ===
- Mini Challenge: The remaining five finalists make a dish for one of Jet Blue's Terminal 5 restaurants. The winner's recipe would be added to the menu for their respective restaurant.
  - Winner: Jeffrey
- Main Challenge: The finalists cater a Miami cocktail party as a team. Each finalist must complete at least two hors d'oeuvres and create a signature cocktail as a group.
  - Winner: None
  - Eliminated: Michael

Original Air Date: July 12, 2009

=== Week 7: Red Lobster Beachside Wood Grilling Challenge ===
- Mini Challenge: The four remaining finalists perform live cooking demos on a Miami morning show. The Food Network crew intentionally "sabotages" each demo to test how the finalists react to adversity.
  - Winner: Debbie
- Main Challenge: Iron Chef Michael Symon presents a seafood challenge on the beach, where they have to cook a wood grilled seafood dish. After the finalists plan their dishes, and select their ingredients, the judges interrupt them. They remove some key ingredients from their workstations and replace them with others, forcing them to change their plan on the fly.
  - The winner of the Main Challenge will have their dish served at Red Lobster as a menu item.
  - Winner: Jeffrey
  - Eliminated: Jamika

Original Air Date: July 19, 2009

=== Week 8: Miami VIP ===
- Mini Challenge: None
- Main Challenge: At Emeril's Restaurant they meet Emeril Lagasse who talks about his friend Julia Child. In the spirit of the new film Julie & Julia, each chef must create their own three course meal using $1,000. They will have three hours to cook for twenty people. After, they will present to the judges, which includes a demo of some portion of their meal. They will also get an advance screening of Julie & Julia prior to the challenge to help inspire them.
  - Final Two: Melissa, Jeffrey
  - Eliminated: Debbie

Original Air Date: July 26, 2009

=== Week 9: Finale ===
- Mini Challenge: None
- Main Challenge: The final two are directed by Alton Brown in creating their own pilots for the show that they would want to host on Food Network.
- Runner-Up: Jeffrey
  - On August 17, 2009 Food Network announced Jeffrey Saad would return in a series of online videos based on his pilot, now called The Spice Smuggler. The program premiered with four 4 1/2-minute videos featuring one spice and a recipe incorporating it.
- The Next Food Network Star: Melissa d'Arabian
- New Show: Ten Dollar Dinners with Melissa d'Arabian

Original Air Date: August 2, 2009
