= W.F. Kaynor Technical High School =

W. F. Kaynor Technical High School

Location
- 43 Tompkins Street; Waterbury, Connecticut 06708; United States; 41°34′24″N 73°03′54″W

Information
- CEEB code: 070855
- Principal: Ken Hilliard
- Grades: 9-12
- Enrollment: 831 (2024–2025)
- Mascot: Panther
- Website: kaynor.cttech.org

W. F. Kaynor Technical High School, or Kaynor Tech, is a technical high school located in Waterbury, Connecticut. Students from Waterbury and the surrounding towns can attend Kaynor. Kaynor Tech is part of the Connecticut Technical Education and Career System.

== History ==
Since opening in 1953, W.F. Kaynor Technical High School has undergone three expansion projects that have reflected the changing complexion of the community and have kept pace with technology. When the school was initially opened, ten trades were offered. In 1968, one of the trades, "Watch, Clock, and Instrument Making", was considered obsolete and was replaced by Electronics. In 1973 Automotive Collision Repair was moved into its new location after years of sharing space with Automotive Trade. Plumbing and Heating was also added at this time. In 1982, Culinary Arts was added. In 1985, Automatic Screw Machine was added, but a lack of interest by students, coupled with a decreased need in the community, resulted in termination of the program in 1989. In the 2009 school year Health Technology was added. The Fashion shop was no longer available to be selected as of 2014. Beginning in the fall of 2015, Informational Systems Technology will be offered in its place. In 2023, Masonry was added as a shop, and in 2024, Electronics was transitioned into Robotics and Automation.

== Technologies ==
In addition to a complete academic program leading to a high school diploma, students attending Kaynor Tech receive training in one of the following trades and technologies:

- Automotive Collision Repair and Refinishing
- Automotive Technology
- Carpentry
- Culinary Arts
- Electrical
- Robotics and Automation
- Hairdressing
- Health Technology
- Information Technology
- Masonry
- Mechanical Design and Engineering Technology
- Plumbing and Heating
- Precision Machining Technology

== Athletics ==
Fall Sports:

- Cross Country
- Volleyball
- Boys Soccer
- Girls Soccer
- Boys Football: Co-op program with H. C Wilcox Technical High School

Winter Sports:

- Boys Basketball
- Girls Basketball

Spring Sports:

- Baseball
- Softball
- Track

== Notable alumni ==
- Scott Conant - Culinary, class of 1989. Conant has been on many cooking shows, including Top Chef, Chopped, and 24 Hour Restaurant Battle
