= Tin Shed Garden Cafe =

Restaurant in Portland, Oregon, U.S.

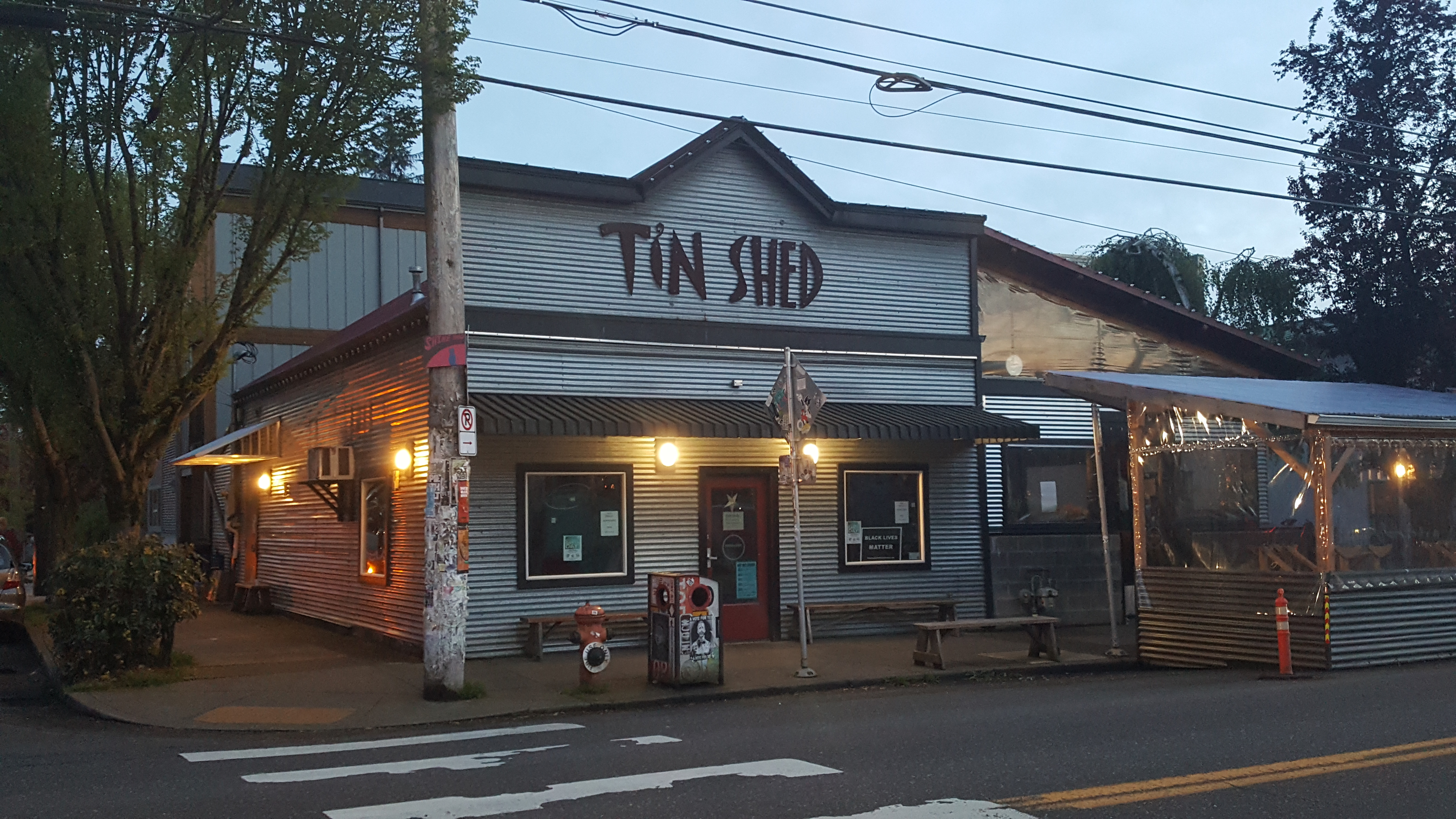
- The restaurant's exterior in 2022
- Interactive map of Tin Shed Garden Cafe

Restaurant information
- Established: 2002
- Owners: Christie Griffin; Janette Kaden
- Food type: American
- Location: 1438 Northeast Alberta Street, Portland, Multnomah, Oregon, 97211, United States
- Coordinates: 45.5590°N 122.6509°W
- Website: tinshedgardencafe.com

Tin Shed Garden Cafe, often shortened as Tin Shed, is a restaurant in Portland, Oregon's King neighborhood. Co-owned by Christie Griffin and Janette Kaden, the dog-friendly cafe opened in 2002 and serves American cuisine.

Tin Shed has appeared on the Food Network's Diners, Drive-Ins and Dives, and in a PBS documentary called Breakfast Special. It has garnered a positive reception, mostly as a brunch destination. Yelp ranked Tin Shed the most dog-friendly eatery in the country in 2023.

== Description ==
Tin Shed Garden Cafe is a restaurant on Alberta Street in northeast Portland's King neighborhood. The lesbian-owned café has an outdoor dining area, a stone fireplace and chimney, an herb garden, and a menu for dogs. Tin Shed hosts Doggie Love Night on Tuesdays, as of 2018. The promotion allows patrons to purchase a "people-priced" item for a free dog dinner. The restaurant provides cookies and water to dogs at no cost. Tin Shed has also hosted live music performances. The New York Times has said the business "draws the flannel-and-fleece crowd to its rustic patio".

Tin Shed serves salmon and veggie burgers, as well as soups and sandwiches. The regular menu has a dish called The Cure, which has buttermilk biscuits and gravy with apple-wood smoked bacon or mushroom-rosemary varieties. The Way Out West has corn tortillas, jasmine rice, ranchero beans, two eggs, Tillamook cheddar, and salsa fresca. The restaurant has also served breakfast burritos, cheese grits, omelettes, shredded-potato cakes, egg and tofu scrambles, Bloody Marys, and vegetarian options. Among the dog-themed scrambles are the Fetch with eggs and bacon, and the Stay, which has greens, mushrooms, and roasted sweet potatoes. The dog menu has included free range meat options; chicken, ground beef, or pork mixed with rice or sweet potatoes; and peanut butter banana ice cream.

== History ==
Co-owners Christie Griffin and Janette Kaden opened Tin Shed in 2002. The restaurant had approximately 30 employees, as of 2005. In 2010, Tin Shed was one of fourteen businesses seeking an exemption to a city ban on the use of public sidewalks for storing trash. The business sold bandanas for dogs, which benefited the Odd Man Inn Animal Refuge, as of 2016.

In 2020, Tin Shed was forced to close temporarily during the COVID-19 pandemic, but reopened with patio service by early September. The restaurant uses compostable packaging and utensils, as of 2020.

Guy Fieri visited Tin Shed for an episode of the Food Network's Diners, Drive-Ins and Dives. In 2010, the restaurant was featured in a PBS documentary called Breakfast Special. In the show, Breakfast in Bridgetown author Paul Gerald describes how Tin Shed and the restaurant Helser's "helped transform a stretch of street, which at one point was known for having the highest number of drive-by shootings in the city, into one of the city's hippest neighborhoods", according to The Oregonian. Chef Nathan Lyon has also visited the restaurant for an episode of Good Food America.

== Reception ==
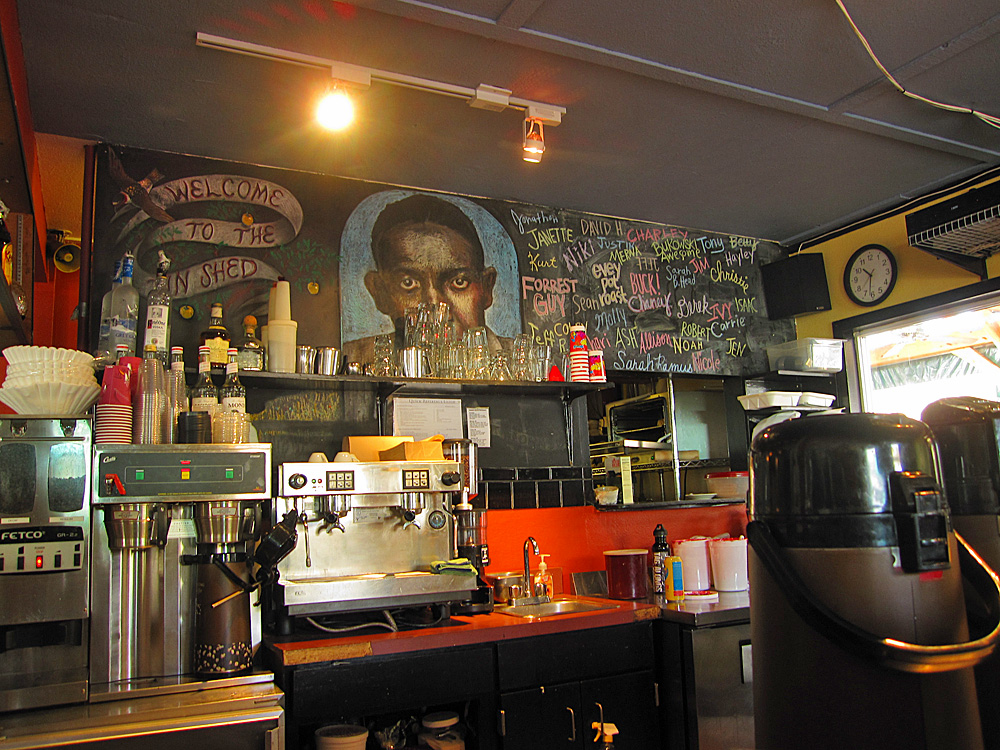
The restaurant's interior in 2010

In 2009, The Oregonian described Tin Shed as a "throwback" to when "offbeat, multi-ethnic flavors" combined with the American breakfast and said, "In short, this is a restaurant with a personality, one that's hard to dislike." The newspaper's Molly Harbarger and Michael Russell included Tin Shed in a 2019 guide of Portland's 40 best brunches. Fast Company called Tin Shed "unprepossessing" and said it is "as famous for its brunch as it is for its high tolerance for dogs in 2010".

In 2006, Willamette Week readers ranked the café first in the Best Brunch category of the annual "Best of Portland" readers' poll. The restaurant won in the Best Hangover Brunch category in 2007. Tin Shed was a runner-up in the category for best dog-friendly establishments in 2016 and 2017, and the café placed second in the Best Brunch Spot category in 2020 and 2025. The newspaper has included Tin Shed in other lists of recommended cheap eats and places to grab hangover brunch.

Autostraddle, an online magazine for LGBTQ women, included Tin Shed in a 2012 "Queer Girl City Guide". Kim Hoffman complimented the restaurant's "insane" benedicts in AfterEllen's 2015 city guide for Portland. Carrie Uffindell included the café in Eater Portland's 2019 list of the city's "primo kid-friendly" restaurants, and Brooke Jackson-Glidden and Michelle DeVona recommended the stack with scrambled eggs and grits or potato cakes and mushroom gravy in their 2020 guide to restaurants on Alberta Street. Zoe Baillargeon and Janey Wong included Tin Shed in Eater Portland's 2023 overview of "real-deal" breakfasts in the city, calling Tin Shed a "breakfast hangout".

Thrillist commented on how friendly Tin Shed was with dogs, additionally stating that it was an "exceptional brunch", offering some of the "best burgers" in Portland. The website's Alex Frane included Tin Shed in a 2018 list of the city's dog-friendly bars. The Food Network has included the artichoke grilled cheese sandwich in a list of the top 16 vegetarian "favorites". In 2023, Yelp ranked Tin Shed number one in a list of the nation's top 100 dog-friendly eateries. The Oregonian's Michael Russell said of the list placement: "Usually I'm skeptical about these kinds of Internet lists, even the ones from Yelp... But in this case, I think they nailed it."

== See also ==
- LGBTQ culture in Portland, Oregon
- List of Diners, Drive-Ins and Dives episodes
- List of restaurants in Portland, Oregon
