= Aiona =

Aiona is a surname. Notable people with the surname include:

- Ippy Aiona, American chef
- Duke Aiona (born 1955), American politician and jurist
