= Murder of Zebb Quinn =

Disappearance and murder of an American in 2000

- Location: Asheville, North Carolina, U.S. (disappearance); Pisgah National Forest, North Carolina, U.S. (alleged murder site)
- Date: January 2, 2000; 26 years ago
- Attack type: Disappearance, murder, alleged proxy murder
- Weapon: Allegedly a .22 rifle
- Victims: Zebb Wayne Quinn, aged 18
- Accused: Walter "Gene" Owens (accused of being the murderer; died 2017); Wesley Smith (accused of ordering the murder)
- Charges: First-degree murder (2017; dropped after plea deal)
- Verdict: Pleaded guilty
- Convictions: Accessory after-the-fact to first-degree murder
- Sentence: 12 1/2 to 15 3/4 years in prison
- Convicted: Robert Jason Owens (convicted as an accessory)

Zebb Wayne Quinn (May 12, 1981 – c. January 2, 2000) was an American teenager who went missing in Asheville, North Carolina. Quinn was 18 years old and working at a local Walmart when he disappeared after finishing his shift. His car was discovered several days later in a restaurant parking lot under unusual circumstances; its headlights had been left on, a live puppy had been left inside, and a drawing of a pair of lips and an exclamation point had been scrawled in pink lipstick on the back window.

Seventeen years later, on July 10, 2017, Robert Jason Owens was indicted for the first-degree murder of Quinn. Owens worked with Quinn at Walmart, and was the last-known person to have seen Quinn alive. On July 25, 2022, over 22 years since Quinn's disappearance, Owens pleaded guilty to the lesser charge of accessory after-the-fact to first-degree murder. Owens claimed that his uncle had been hired to murder Quinn by the boyfriend of a woman whom Quinn had been romantically interested in, and that he had helped his uncle cover up the murder. Owens' uncle died in 2017, and there has not been an arrest of the alleged instigator. Owens' conviction legally establishes that Quinn was murdered despite the absence of his body.

== Disappearance ==
At around 9:00 p.m., on Sunday, January 2, 2000, Zebb Quinn ended his shift at the electronics department of a Walmart in Asheville, North Carolina. At the time, Quinn had been enrolled in an ROTC program. He had plans to travel after work to Leicester with Robert Jason Owens, one of his co-workers, to buy a new car. Quinn met Owens in the Walmart parking lot before they drove separately to look at the vehicle. The two men were seen on surveillance footage at a nearby gas station at approximately 9:15 p.m., purchasing sodas at a convenience store.

According to Owens, after leaving the gas station, Quinn signaled for him to pull over by flashing his headlights. Quinn told him that he had received a message on his pager and needed to return the call. After he returned from using a payphone, Owens described Quinn as "frantic". Quinn told him that he needed to cancel their plans and eventually sped off, rear-ending Owens's truck. Hours later, Owens was treated at a hospital for fractured ribs and a head injury that he said he had sustained in a second car accident that evening. No accident report was filed with police.

The following afternoon, Quinn's mother Denise Vlahakis filed a missing persons report. Two days after he was last seen, a man purporting to be Quinn placed a phone call to the Walmart where he was employed. The man told Quinn's co-worker that he would not be coming to work because of illness, but the co-worker thought that the voice sounded unfamiliar and that it was not Quinn. The phone call was traced back to a Volvo plant where Owens worked. When questioned, Owens admitted making the phone call, claiming that he was doing his friend a favor after Quinn phoned and asked Owens to call in sick for him.

== Investigation ==
During the investigation, police interviewed a woman named Misty Taylor, in whom Quinn was romantically interested. Quinn had developed a relationship with her in the weeks preceding his disappearance and had told friends and family that he had been threatened by her abusive boyfriend, Wesley Smith, after he discovered the two had been speaking. Taylor and Smith have denied any involvement in Quinn's disappearance. No ties between Owens and either Taylor or Smith have been established.

A review of the phone records in the case indicates that the page Quinn received on the evening of January 2 was dialed from the home of his paternal aunt, a woman named Ina Ustich. Quinn had very little contact with Ustich prior to his disappearance, and she denied making the call. Ustich told police she was having dinner at the home of her friend Tamra Taylor, Misty's mother; Misty and Smith were also present. Ustich later filed a police report stating that her house was broken into that evening. Although nothing was stolen, she reported that a few picture frames and other items were moved around.

On January 6, 2000, Vlahakis received a phone call from a former classmate of Quinn's, who happened to be a co-worker at the Asheville hospital where both were nurses, who told her that she had seen his Mazda Protegé in the parking lot of a barbecue restaurant adjacent to the hospital. Police examined the car, which had been left with its headlights on; a pair of lips and an exclamation mark were drawn on the car's back windshield in lipstick, and a live black Labrador-mix puppy was found inside. A plastic hotel key card was also discovered in the vehicle, but investigators were unable to trace the hotel. Also found were several drink bottles and a jacket that did not belong to Quinn. Police collected forensic evidence from the car but uncovered no new leads.

Quinn's mother believes the car was placed there by someone who had knowledge that she, Quinn's grandmother, and Quinn's sister worked nearby, intending that one of them would find it. The puppy was later adopted by one of the investigators. A couple later called local police to report that they had seen Quinn's car being driven in downtown Asheville, and assisted police in producing a composite image of the person driving the car. Police would later note that the sketch bore a striking resemblance to Misty Taylor.

=== Developments since 2015 ===
On March 17, 2015, fifteen years after Quinn's disappearance, Owens was arrested in an unrelated incident for the disappearance and murder of Food Network Star contestant Cristie Schoen, her husband J.T. Codd, and their unborn child. Owens later admitted to killing the family by accidentally running over them, and also pleaded guilty to two counts of dismembering human remains. On April 27, 2017, as part of a plea deal his attorneys had reached with Buncombe County District Attorney Todd Williams, Owens was ordered to spend between 60 and 75 years in prison without the possibility of parole.

In June 2015, detectives investigating Quinn's disappearance announced they had unearthed "fabric, leather materials, and unknown hard fragments" under a layer of concrete on Owens's property. The search warrant was initially obtained on March 31, 2015. According to the warrant, investigators also found an unknown white powder substance, as well as pieces of metal and concrete. On another part of the property, authorities found "numerous plastic bags containing possibly pulverized lime or powdered mortar mix." Authorities did not comment on whether the fragments found were human bones or if they believed that they had discovered Quinn's remains, citing an ongoing investigation.

In July 2022, it was announced that Owens had told investigators in 2018 that a family member killed Quinn, dismembered his body and burned the remains, and that evidence could be found in Bent Creek Experimental Forest.

=== Indictment ===
On July 10, 2017, a Buncombe County grand jury returned an indictment charging Owens with first-degree murder for the death of Quinn. According to the Asheville Police Department, "this indictment is the result of years of investigative work and persistence by detectives of the Asheville Police Department, as well as ongoing partnerships with members of the Quinn family and the Buncombe County District Attorney's Office." According to Buncombe County District Attorney Todd Williams, the trial had been delayed several times because of "personnel changes" and "jury trials have been suspended by order of Chief Justice (Cheri) Beasley" due to COVID-19 concerns. In July 2022, attorneys announced a potential date for July 25 for a possible plea deal, but said that the date could change depending on the availability of Quinn's family members.

=== Plea deal and Owens's account ===
On July 25, 2022, Owens pleaded guilty to the lesser charge of accessory after-the-fact to first-degree murder. Via his attorneys, Owens accused his uncle, Walter "Gene" Owens, who died in 2017, of murdering Zebb Quinn. Robert claimed that Quinn had been part of a love triangle involving Taylor, Smith and Quinn, and that a jealous Smith hired Gene to murder Quinn. Robert and Quinn were unknowingly lured by Gene to meet Taylor in Pisgah National Forest, where the two found Gene present instead. Gene then murdered Quinn by shooting him with a .22 rifle, after which he dismembered and burned Quinn's corpse. Robert stated that he assisted his uncle in the cover-up.

Owens's account was met with skepticism by the prosecution. The court accepted the plea deal, notwithstanding citing a lack of strong physical evidence linking Robert Jason Owens directly to Quinn's death. Robert Jason Owens was sentenced to 12 1/2 to 15 3/4 years in prison, to be served concurrently with his de facto life sentence for the two unrelated killings. The district attorney stated that while the entirety of Quinn's fate may never come to light, Owens's conviction legally establishes that Zebb Quinn was murdered.

== Media coverage ==
The case was featured in the February 2001 issue of the Spin magazine, which included interviews with Owens as well as other key figures in the case. The case received increased visibility in 2012 when it was covered on the show Disappeared. It was also covered by Casefile True Crime Podcast on April 13, 2024.

== See also ==
- List of kidnappings
- List of murder convictions without a body
- List of solved missing person cases (2000s)
