= Michele Ragussis =

American chef (born 1969)

- Born: November 26, 1969 (age 55); Derby, Connecticut, United States
- Education: Johnson & Wales University
- Culinary career
- Cooking style: New England–style seafood
- Current restaurant(s): Pearl Seafood Restaurant & Raw Bar Rockland, Maine
- Website: www.chefonapier.com

Michele Ragussis (born November 26, 1969, in Derby, Connecticut) is an American chef. She is best known as a finalist on the eighth season of the Food Network series Food Network Star.

== Food Network ==
Ragussis appeared as a contestant on Chopped in 2010 but was eliminated after the entrée round. She did win an episode of 24 Hour Restaurant Battle in 2011 with her partner Davina Thomasula, but their potential restaurant, Avery Point, never came to fruition. At the time of this appearance, Ragussis and Thomasula owned Stuft Catering in Brooklyn, New York.

=== Food Network Star ===
In 2012, Ragussis became a contestant in the eighth season of the Food Network series Food Network Star. She eventually became one of the final four contestants, and she filmed a pilot for a potential series called My New England. She eventually lost the competition to Justin Warner.

In March 2016, it was announced that Ragussis would appear on the Food Network Star spin-off series Comeback Kitchen, which gives eliminated contestants a chance to re-enter the competition for season 12. Comeback Kitchen premiered on May 8, 2016 but the premiere episode became available on demand in April 2016. She was eliminated from the competition on May 22.

== Personal life ==
Ragussis was born to an Italian–Greek family in Derby, Connecticut, but moved to Bristol, Rhode Island, to attend college. Although she has been reported to have been born and raised in Brooklyn, New York, she did not move to Brooklyn until after she completed college. Ragussis has two sisters and at one time lived in Rockland, Maine.

Ragussis currently serves as the Executive chef at Central House at The Crown in Provincetown Massachusetts on Commercial St. She is a lesbian.
