= Jeffrey Saad =

Television chef

- Born: 1966 or 1967 (age 59–60); Chicago, Illinois
- Education: Culinary Institute of America; California Culinary Academy
- Spouse: Nadia
- Culinary career
- Current restaurant(s): Sweet Heat Pasta Pomodoro Italian Restaurants The Grove La Ventura
- Television show(s): United Tastes of America Spice Smuggler The Next Food Network Star

Jeffrey Saad (born c. 1967) is an American chef, author, restaurant owner, television personality, and real estate broker from Chicago, Illinois. He is currently the host of United Tastes of America on the Cooking Channel and Estate Director with Compass in Beverly Hills.

== Career ==
Saad became interested in the culinary business when he was a teenager working at a diner behind his junior high school. Later in his life, he enrolled in the Hotel Restaurant Management Program at Iowa State University. There he earned the title of chef de cuisine during his sophomore year. He continued studies at the Culinary Institute of America and the California Culinary Academy. He performed his internship in London, with Anton Mosimann.

In 1993 Saad traveled to Mexico looking to expand his knowledge of the Mexican cuisine. This led him to open a Mexican-influenced restaurant called Sweet Heat in San Francisco. After that, he opened two more restaurants and started his own signature line of bottled chutneys. Among his culinary and business ventures, he became a partner of California's Pasta Pomodoro Italian Restaurants. After that, Saad moved to Los Angeles with his wife and they both started running a real estate company.

In 2009 Saad auditioned for the fifth season of the show The Next Food Network Star. He ended up as the first runner-up, losing to Melissa d'Arabian in the finale. However, Food Network gave him the opportunity to host his own web series called Spice Smuggler, where he highlighted spices and foods from other countries. The web series ran for a year, and then Cooking Channel asked him to be the host of the show United Tastes of America.

Saad is a partner and executive chef of "The Grove" restaurants in San Francisco. He also distributes his own collection of spice blends. In 2012, Saad released his first cookbook titled Jeffrey Saad's Global Kitchen: Recipes Without Borders. On December 9, 2013, he opened the restaurant, La Ventura in Studio City, California.

=== Television appearances ===
In addition to his own shows, Saad has appeared on these other cooking shows:

- Grill It! with Bobby Flay
- Unique Sweets
- Unique Cocktails
- The Rachael Ray Show
- Iron Chef America Countdown
- ABC World News Now

In 2012 he competed in Food Network's Chopped All-Stars. Saad ended up in second place, behind Marcus Samuelsson, but above chefs like Keegan Gerhard, Aarti Sequeira, and Michael Symon.

== Personal life ==
Saad lives in Los Angeles with his wife, Nadia, and two children. His wife is of Iranian descent. Saad enjoys surfing and mountain biking. He also practices taekwondo. He began practicing it while studying in college, and reached black belt under Master Brandt in San Francisco. He also practiced at the Southern California Tae Kwon Do Center under Scot Lewis where he received his second degree black belt.
