= Nikki Martin =

American actress

Nikki Martin is an American lifestyle TV personality, author and celebrity chef, currently based in Los Angeles, California. She is perhaps best known as a chef on the eighth season of the Food Network series Food Network Star.

== Early life ==
Martin was born in Long Beach, California. At 17, she moved to Hollywood to pursue a career in entertainment. After a few television shows, movie appearances and a short stint at Harvard University, she decided her path was in lifestyle TV and the culinary arts. She has no formal culinary training and had attended Harvard to study and pursue medicine. But after realizing her path was set for the big screen and a life of creative endeavors, she merged her two passions of food and entertainment. In 2010, Martin auditioned for a Food Network show to begin her new career as a celebrity chef and lifestyle TV personality. Martin graduated from Aliso Niguel High School in 1998. Martin resides in Los Angeles, working as a private chef for various celebrities. She has founded an underground dinner club known as The Roulette Society. With actor Jonathan Bennett, she co-wrote The Burn CookBook, a February 2018 release based on the cult film Mean Girls.

== Early media roles and Food Network ==
Martin has appeared on television shows, including Titus, Scrubs and Birds of Prey; as well as films such as Sorority Boys and Looney Tunes: Back in Action. She appeared on the Food Network series 24 Hour Restaurant Battle in July 2011, competing with her best friend, Dana Chaney. Since her first Food Network appearance she has been featured as a celebrity chef on several food and lifestyle programming including Chopped Grill Masters, Bravo's Going Off the Menu and is most remembered for her participation in the series Food Network Star; where Martin made a name for herself in the grilling world as "The Grill Next Door".

=== Food Network Star ===
In May 2012, Martin was chosen as a contestant on Food Network Star, season 8; she was mentored by Bobby Flay. She originally used the tagline "girl-on-grill", (Note: The term is a play on the phrase "girl-on-girl".) but because Food Network president Bob Tuschman found the double entendre to be too risqué, she subsequently started calling herself "the grill next door". Martin was eliminated from the show on July 15, placing in the top six.

== Filmography ==
=== Film ===
Year	Title	Role	Notes
2002	Sorority Boys	Tri Pi	
2003	Cradle 2 the Grave	Ring Girl	
2003	Looney Tunes: Back in Action	Wooden Nickel Waitress	
2006	Diamondz n da Ruff	Mercedez	
2012	DisOrientation	Jenny	

=== Television ===
Year	Title	Role	Notes
2001	Scrubs	Nurse	1 episode
2001	Titus	Cheerleader	1 episode
2003	Birds of Prey	Marryann Travis	1 episode
2011	24 Hour Restaurant Battle	Herself	
2012	Food Network Star	Herself	10 episodes
2013	Food Saver Infomercial	Herself	1 episode
2016	MasterChef Junior	Herself	1 episode
2017	Chopped Grill Masters: Battle 4	Herself	1 episode
