= Food Network Star season 8 =

Food Network Star
- Season 8
- No. of contestants: 15
- Winner: Justin Warner
- No. of episodes: 11

Release
- Original network: Food Network
- Original release: May 13 – July 22, 2012

Season chronology
- ← Previous; Season 7 Next → Season 9

The eighth season of the American reality television series Food Network Star premiered Sunday, May 13, 2012 and consisted of 11 episodes. The format for the eighth season changed to three 5-member teams, each coached by a Food Network host — Alton Brown, Bobby Flay or Giada De Laurentiis. This season viewers had the opportunity to follow the show (#Star) or their favorite team (#TeamAlton, #TeamBobby or #TeamGiada) on Twitter.

== Contestants ==
=== Eliminated ===
(in order of elimination)

- Cristie Schoen – New Orleans, Louisiana – Team Alton
- Kara Sigle – Chicago, Illinois – Team Bobby
- Josh Lyons – Jupiter, Florida – Team Giada
- Eric Lee – Petaluma, California – Team Bobby
- Judson Allen – Chicago, Illinois – Team Alton
- Linkie Marais – North Attleborough, Massachusetts – Team Giada
- Emily Ellyn – Orlando, Florida – Team Alton
- Malcolm Mitchell – Washington, D.C. – Team Bobby
- Martita Jara – San Diego, California – Team Giada
- Nikki Martin – West Hollywood, California – Team Bobby
- Philip "Ippy" Aiona – Kamuela, Hawaii – Team Giada

=== Runners-Up ===
- Martie Duncan – Birmingham, Alabama – Team Alton
- Michele Ragussis – Brooklyn, New York – Team Bobby
- Yvan Lemoine – Maspeth, New York – Team Giada

=== Winner ===
- Justin Warner – Brooklyn, New York – Team Alton

== Contestant Progress ==
Team Alton Team Bobby Team Giada

Contestant											
Contestant	1	2	3	4	5	6	7	8	9	10	11
Justin	IN	HIGH	HIGH	WIN	LOW	WIN	HIGH	HIGH	IN	IN	WINNER
Michele	WIN	IN	IN	IN	HIGH	HIGH	IN	LOW	IN	IN	RUNNER-UP
Yvan	IN	WIN	IN	IN	WIN	HIGH	IN	IN	HIGH	IN	RUNNER-UP
Martie	IN	IN	LOW	WIN	LOW	WIN	HIGH	IN	HIGH	IN	RUNNER-UP
Ippy	HIGH	WIN	IN	LOW	WIN	IN	IN	WIN	LOW	OUT	
Nikki	WIN	IN	LOW	HIGH	IN	LOW	LOW	HIGH	IN	OUT	
Martita	IN	WIN	IN	HIGH	WIN	IN	LOW	IN	OUT		
Malcolm	WIN	HIGH	IN	IN	IN	IN	IN	OUT			
Emily	IN	IN	IN	WIN	LOW	WIN	OUT				
Linkie	IN	WIN	HIGH	IN	WIN	OUT					
Judson	HIGH	LOW	IN	WIN	OUT						
Eric	WIN	IN	HIGH	OUT							
Josh	LOW	WIN	OUT								
Kara	WIN	OUT									
Cristie	OUT										

(WINNER) The contestant won the competition and became the next "Food Network Star".
(RUNNER-UP) The contestant made it to the finale, but did not win.
(WIN) The contestant was a member of the winning team and was one of the committee's favorites for that week.
(WIN) The contestant was a member of the winning team.
(HIGH) The contestant was one of the committee's favorites for that week, but was not on the winning team.
(IN) The contestant was not a member of the winning team, but was not one of the committee's least favorites. They were not up for elimination.
(LOW) The contestant was one of the committee's three or four least favorites for that week, but won the Producer's Challenge, and was safe.
(LOW) The contestant was one of the committee's two least favorites for that week, but won the Producer's Challenge, and was safe.
(OUT) The contestant was one of the committee's least favorites for that week, lost the Producer's Challenge, and was eliminated.

== Episode summaries ==
=== Week 1: Impossible Beginnings ===
The contestants were introduced and chosen by their mentors.

- Star Challenge: The teams were challenged to each open a new restaurant in 24 hours, with $5,000 total to spend on food and decorations. Then, the teams had to present their restaurants to 150 guests, who would decide which restaurant they would like to go to, Robert Irvine, and the Selection Committee. The restaurants that were opened were Do South (Team Alton), The Tasting Space (Team Bobby) and Blu (Team Giada).
  - Winners: Team Bobby: Eric (Handcrafted Mushroom Lasagna), Kara (Carmelito Cookies with Vanilla Whipped Cream and Candied Nuts), Malcolm (LoLa Shrimp and Parmesan Polenta Grits with Tomato Basil Concasse), Michele (Steamed Mussels with Chorizo and Fennel Broth), Nikki (Wild Rocket and Grilled Corn Salad)
  - Judges' Least Favorites: Cristie of Team Alton (Black Bean and Cabbage Purée with Parmesan Crisp), Josh of Team Giada (Fried Nori Dumpling Soup)
  - Producers' Challenge: Create a Mother's Day brunch item and present it to camera in one minute.
  - Eliminated: Cristie (Bill's American Scottish Eggs)

Original Air Date: May 13, 2012

=== Week 2: NYC on the Go ===
- Star Challenge: The teams are each sent to one neighborhood in New York: the Lower East Side (Team Alton), Harlem (Team Bobby) or Arthur Avenue (Team Giada). Once there, they visit a classic restaurant and must integrate their signature item into a dish that they will present in front of the Selection Committee and a group of tourists on a moving bus tour of the neighborhood they visited.
  - Winners: Team Giada: Ippy (Eggplant Zuppa), Josh (Sausage and Peppers Crostini), Linkie (Ricotta Cannoli Cheesecake), Martita (Mexican-Italian-Inspired Ceviche), Yvan (Mozzarella Antipasti)
  - Judges' Least Favorites: Judson of Team Alton (Slawed Pickles Three Ways), Kara of Team Bobby (Fried Chicken and Eggnog Cinnamon Waffles)
  - Producers' Challenge: Create a memorable dish with potatoes and present it to camera in one minute.
  - Eliminated: Kara (Twice-Baked Potato)

Original Air Date: May 20, 2012

=== Week 3: Dessert Chopping Block ===
- Star Challenge: The teams must compete in a Chopped challenge against the other members of their own team, making a dessert. One person from each team will be up for elimination.
- Ingredients:
- Team Alton: Hershey's Kisses, pancetta, graham crackers, kumquats
- Team Bobby: Hershey's Milk Chocolate Bars, pineapple, pasta sheets, black lava salt
- Team Giada: Reese's Pieces, popcorn kernels, shredded coconut, grape soda
  - Winners: None [The judges noted that they liked Team Alton's food best.]
  - Judges' Least Favorites: Martie of Team Alton (Indoor S'mores with Kumquat Syrup), Nikki of Team Bobby (Challah Bread and Pasta Sheet Pudding), Josh of Team Giada (Æbleskiver)
  - Producers' Challenge: Create a dish inspired by the month's most frequently asked question: "If you don't have an outdoor grill, what can you make?" and present it to camera in one minute.
  - Eliminated: Josh (Frikadëller Meatballs with Rødbeder Pickled Beets)

Original Air Date: May 27, 2012

=== Week 4: Fashion Week Food Makeover ===
- Star Challenge: The teams are asked to prepare "chic" makeovers of classic dishes for a Fashion Week show, and then to present them on-stage to the audience. Chopped host Ted Allen appeared as a guest judge.
  - Winners: Team Alton: Emily (Ham Steak with Pineapple and Maraschino Cherries as "Hat's Off to Ham"), Judson (Seafood Alfredo as Paella-Inspired Seafood Pasta with Cognac Cream Sauce), Justin (Beef Stroganoff as Stroganoff Darnier with Mushroom Gel), Martie (Tuna Noodle Casserole as "Tuna Noodle Casserole 2.0")
    - Justin of Team Alton was voted by the audience and judges as the best makeover, and was awarded a $10,000 debit card.
  - Judges' Least Favorites: Eric of Team Bobby (Fish Sticks and Tartar Sauce as Beer-Battered Fish with Tartar Sauce), Ippy of Team Giada (Salisbury Steak with Peas and Carrots as Pancetta-Crusted Steak with Sautéed Peas and Carrots)
  - Producers' Challenge: Describe a pre-prepared dish of French Toast to camera in one minute. [No cooking was involved.]
  - Eliminated: Eric

Original Air Date: June 3, 2012

=== Week 5: Guy Live ===
- Star Challenge: The teams are asked to do a 10-minute themed presentation with Guy Fieri in front of a live audience. The themes were Halloween (Team Alton), Cooking for Kids (Team Bobby), and Big Game Day (Team Giada). The each member of the losing team was up for elimination.
  - Winners: Team Giada: Ippy (Teriyaki Burger), Linkie (Football Cookies), Martita (Asparagus and Goat Cheese Quesadilla), Yvan ("Game Day" Wings) [Team Bobby and Team Giada both won, however, the judges noted that they liked Team Giada's food and presentation better.]
  - Judges' Least Favorites: Team Alton: Emily (Homemade Canned Applesauce), Judson (Vegetarian-Style Chili), Justin (Fried Sardine Skeletons), Martie (Spicy Buffalo Wings)
  - Producers' Challenge: Throw a dart at a state on a U.S map and create a dish inspired by that state and present it to camera in one minute.
  - Eliminated: Judson (Arkansas: Pecan-Crusted Baked Catfish)

Original Air Date: June 10, 2012

=== Week 6: Iron Chef Food Court ===
- Star Challenge: The teams are challenged to do a themed kiosk inside of a food court. After preparation begins, Iron Chef Geoffrey Zakarian delivered a secret ingredient: chicken livers, which one member on each team must use. The kiosks that were opened were Littler Italy (Italian) (Team Alton), The American Sandbox (American Deli) (Team Bobby), and Besa Me (Mexican) (Team Giada).
  - Winners: Team Alton: Emily (Grilled Sweet Apple and Fontina Panini with Honey Dipping Sauce), Justin (Fritto Misto), Martie (Italian Rice Balls)
  - Judges' Least Favorites: Nikki of Team Bobby (Baja-Style California Taco), Linkie of Team Giada (Cinnamon Churro "Biscotti" with Mexican Hot Chocolate)
  - Producers' Challenge: Create a dish with the ingredient most frequently searched for on the Food Network website: chicken, and present it to camera in one minute.
  - Eliminated: Linkie (Spiced Rum Chicken with Tomatoes and Basil)

Original Air Date: June 17, 2012

=== Week 7: Meet the Press-ure ===
- Star Challenge: The nine remaining contestants are told that they will no longer be competing as teams and are asked to prepare one bite for the producers of hit news shows (such as Entertainment Today) and the Selection Committee and do a 90-second presentation on how that dish represents them. One person from each team will be up for elimination.
  - Winners: Justin (Peanut Butter Stuffed Dates), and Martie (Chocolate "Roulash" Roulade Cake) of Team Alton
  - Judges' Least Favorites: Emily of Team Alton (Thanksgiving Bites), Nikki of Team Bobby (Grilled Scallops with Rose Petals), Martita of Team Giada (Butternut Squash Flautas)
  - Producers' Challenge: Create a burger that represents you and present it to camera in one minute.
  - Eliminated: Emily (Classic Fifties-Style Hamburger with Sweet-Fried Pickles)

Original Air Date: June 24, 2012

=== Week 8: Deen Family Beach Party ===
- Star Challenge: The eight remaining contestants are asked to cater the South Beach Food & Wine Festival for 100 people, the Selection Committee, and Paula Deen and her family. They must make two spins on the same dish: one for adults and one for kids and tape 30-second videos that include a party-planning tip. One person from each team (Martie of Team Alton, Nikki of Team Bobby, Martita of Team Giada) will then go to Target and shop for decór for the party. The bottom two people on one of the teams will be up for elimination.
  - Winner: Ippy of Team Giada (Pan-Roasted "Misoyaki" Chilean Sea Bass). Ippy was cited by the judges as having the best food and presentation, and was awarded a $20,000 Target gift card.
  - Judges' Least Favorites: Malcolm (Caribbean-Style Jerk Chicken), and Michele (Stone Crab-Stuffed Lettuce Cups) of Team Bobby
  - Producers' Challenge: Create a drink that reflects who you are and do a live one-minute presentation in the Pitch Room in front of the judges.
  - Eliminated: Malcolm (Apple Cobbler-Inspired Cocktail)

Original Air Date: July 1, 2012

=== Week 9: Deliciously Unpredictable Demos ===
- Star Challenge: The seven remaining contestants are challenged to do a three-minute live cooking demo at the South Beach Wine & Food Festival. They must create their signature dish and demo one step of it to a live audience and the Selection Committee. There is a twist, however; each demo is set up to have some sort of problem meant to test the contestants' main weaknesses. The bottom two people on one of the teams will be up for elimination.
  - Winners: Martie of Team Alton (Grouper "en Papillote" with Lemons and Limes [Problem: No correct ingredients]), Yvan of Team Giada ("Love Bites" (Fried Oysters, with Pomegranates and Sea Urchin) [Problem: Microphone does not work])
  - Judges' Least Favorites: Ippy (Pasta and Scallops with "Vodka Fusion" Sauce [Problem: Audience members chatter during the presentation and several of them get up and leave]), and Martita of Team Giada (Pork, Plantain, and Peach-Stuffed Chile Relleno [Problem: Ingredients are switched])
  - Producers' Challenge: The contestants were asked to describe an ingredient (oranges) in a live one-minute presentation in front of the judges, with emphasis on how that ingredient reflects them. [No cooking was involved.]
  - Eliminated: Martita

Original Air Date: July 8, 2012

=== Week 10: Pilot Green Lights ===
- Star Challenge: The six remaining contestants are given three takes to do a 30-second promo of the show that they would like to have on the Food Network. Afterwards, the Selection Committee and a group of Food Network personalities viewed the promos and gave their opinion to help with choosing the three hopefuls to get a pilot. Only one person from each team would be able to move on.
  - Safe: Michele of Team Bobby, Yvan of Team Giada, and both Justin and Martie of Team Alton were allowed to move on. Justin was first announced as being safe (which meant Martie would have been eliminated), but due to the quality of their performances, it was announced that Martie would be allowed to tape a pilot too.
  - Final Challenge: The four remaining contestants returned to New York, where they consulted with their mentors before filming pilots for their upcoming shows.
  - Eliminated: Nikki and Ippy

Original Air Date: July 15, 2012

=== Week 11: Finale: A Star is Born ===
- Reunion: The contestants return for a recap of the season; including special behind the scenes clips and commentary for the viewers to watch. Martie of Team Alton was eliminated early . In the end of the episode, Justin, from Team Alton was declared the winner, allowing him to join the ranks of previous Food Network Star winners.
  - Runners-Up: Martie of Team Alton, Michele of Team Bobby, Yvan of Team Giada
  - Winner: Justin of Team Alton
  - New Show: Rebel with a Culinary Cause

Original Air Date: July 22, 2012
