= Chopped After Hours =

- Genre: cooking
- Presented by: Ted Allen
- Country of origin: United States
- Original language: English
- No. of seasons: 3
- No. of episodes: 19

Chopped After Hours is an American cooking show on the Food Network, hosted by Ted Allen.

== Format ==
A spin-off of Chopped, this show features a similar format with mandatory ingredients and time restriction. Episodes consist of three segments, each featuring the judges from a different Chopped episode. The judges are given one of that episode's mystery ingredient baskets and must cook a dish that incorporates them. No one is eliminated or declared the winner; instead, the judges and Ted Allen taste each other's dishes and comment on them.

== Episodes ==
- All episode titles include the word "and".

=== Season 1 ===
No.	Title/original air date	1st segment		2nd segment		3rd segment	
No.	Title/original air date	Ingredients	Competitors	Ingredients	Competitors	Ingredients	Competitors
1	"All-Stars Finale, Dads, and Chocolate" September 15, 2015	"All Stars Tournament Grand Finale" appetizer: fish carcass, tasso ham, Calabrian chilies, purple potatoes	Geoffrey Zakarian, Alex Guarnaschelli, Scott Conant	"Four Fathers" appetizer: Dover sole, sour cream, salt & vinegar potato chips, red Russian kale	Chris Santos, Scott Conant, Maneet Chauhan	"Chocolate Competition" entrée: chocolate cake pops, white chocolate cocoa mix, quail, chilies	Maneet Chauhan, Marc Murphy, Aarón Sanchez
2	"Trash Fish, Breakfast, and Spicy" September 22, 2015	"Dread and Breakfast" breakfast: coffee cake, mimosa, breakfast sausage, chocolate cream-filled eggs	Chris Santos, Scott Conant, Aarón Sanchez	"Tendon Intentions" entrée: porgy (trash fish), olive tapenade, blood oranges, vermicelli noodles	Geoffrey Zakarian, Amanda Freitag, Marc Murphy	"Hot Stuff" dessert: chili pepper honey, pink lemons, canary melon, devil's tres leches cake	Alex Guarnaschelli, Marc Murphy, Maneet Chauhan
3	"Rock Stars, Lamb Entrées, and Late Night" September 29, 2015	"Late Night Food Brawl" dessert: rice & cheese burrito, chocolate milk, whipped cream, apple pie	Geoffrey Zakarian, Maneet Chauhan, Scott Conant	"Burn for the Worse" entrée: rack of lamb, mint julep, eggplant, apple spice cake	Marc Murphy, Alex Guarnaschelli, Chris Santos	"Rock Stars" dessert: spiced German liqueur, lemon rolls, rock candy, ginger	Aarón Sanchez, Alex Guarnaschelli, Chris Santos
4	"Short Order, Celebrity Finale, and Food Truck" October 6, 2015	"Tournament of Stars Finale" dessert: blueberry goat cheese, churros, pecans, champagne	Geoffrey Zakarian, Alex Guarnaschelli, Marc Murphy	"Food Truck Fight" entrée: whole suckling pig, fiddlehead ferns, kebab sauces, corn tortillas	Scott Conant, Amanda Freitag, Aarón Sanchez	"Short Order Cooks" dessert: banana pudding, vanilla ice cream, icing, brownie mix	Alex Guarnaschelli, Geoffrey Zakarian, Chris Santos
5	"Carnival, Redemption, and Thanksgiving" October 13, 2015	"Return and Redeem" entrée: red snapper, sour candy gummy belts, quinoa, pickled turnips	Scott Conant, Ted Allen, Geoffrey Zakarian (host: Alex Guarnaschelli)	"Wild Ride" entrée: hot beef sundae, fried spiced ham, fried cheese ravioli, asparagus	Maneet Chauhan, Ted Allen, Scott Conant (host: Geoffrey Zakarian)	"A Chopped Thanksgiving" entrée: whole turkey, giblet gravy, Brussels sprouts, pumpkin pie ice cream	Maneet Chauhan, Ted Allen, Chris Santos (host: Alex Guarnaschelli)
6	"Halloween, Grandma, and Meatballs" October 20, 2015	"A Chopped Halloween" dessert: day-of-the-dead cookies, boo-nilla shakes, chocolate-covered bugs, watermelon brain	Chris Santos, Geoffrey Zakarian, Alex Guarnaschelli	"Grandma vs. Grandma" dessert: meatloaf mix, Old Fashioned, sweet potatoes, green beans	Scott Conant, Amanda Freitag, Chris Santos	"Meatball Madness" appetizer: lamb shanks, ginger, baby leeks, crème brûlée	Scott Conant, Amanda Freitag, Geoffrey Zakarian
7	"Bizarre Foods, April Fools' Day, and Barbecue" October 27, 2015	"Bizarre Baskets" dessert: goat heads, flaming shiso, blue foot mushrooms, kholodets	Chris Santos, Alex Guarnaschelli, Geoffrey Zakarian	"Big Barbecue Bout" entrée: North Carolina barbecue sauce, avocado, rainbow chards, spare ribs	Amanda Freitag, Marc Murphy, Maneet Chauhan	"Fake Cake, Real Stakes" dessert: candy, pound cake, fruit purée, buttermilk	Amanda Freitag, Geoffrey Zakarian, Alex Guarnaschelli
8	"Halloween, Striped Bass Entrées, and Pizza" November 3, 2015	"Pizza Perfect" entrée: deep dish pizza dough, rabbit escabeche, Swiss chard, pineapple cheese spread	Amanda Freitag, Geoffrey Zakarian, Alex Guarnaschelli (host: Aarón Sanchez)	"Without Missing a Beet" entrée: pink beans, sofrito, coconut chocolate bar, striped bass	Aarón Sanchez, Marc Murphy, Chris Santos (host: Alex Guarnaschelli)	"Extreme Halloween" appetizer: potato crisps, eels, candy bats, congealed pig's blood	Chris Santos, Alex Guarnaschelli, Marc Murphy

=== Season 2 ===
No.	Title/original air date	1st segment		2nd segment		3rd segment	
No.	Title/original air date	Ingredients	Competitors	Ingredients	Competitors	Ingredients	Competitors
1	"Redemption and Fried Foods" July 5, 2016	"T.G.I. Fry-day" entrée: cube steak, pickled green tomatoes, duck fat, chocolate sandwich cookies	Alex Guarnaschelli, Scott Conant, Amanda Freitag	"Military Vets" dessert: lemonade, ballpark peanuts, marshmallow cereal treats, peaches	Marc Murphy, Geoffrey Zakarian, Alex Guarnaschelli	"Redeemed or Re-chopped?" appetizer: vegan lobster, chop suey, hot mustard, winter melon	Marcus Samuelsson, Amanda Freitag, Aarón Sanchez
2	"Family, College, and Chicken" July 12, 2016	"Family Affair" appetizer: pork roll, pizza dough, baby eggplant, Chinese spaghetti sauce	Geoffrey Zakarian, Marc Murphy, Maneet Chauhan	"College Challenge" entrée: strip steaks, ranch dressing, broccoli, pizza turnovers	Chris Santos, Marc Murphy, Aarón Sanchez	"Count Your Chickens" dessert: chicken suckers, farm-fresh eggs, fruitcake, chicken fat	Aarón Sanchez, Amanda Freitag, Marcus Samuelsson
3	"Thanksgiving, moms, and sitcom moms" July 19, 2016	"Sitcom Moms" appetizer: portobello mushrooms, sour cream, spinach, TV dinner	Alex Guarnaschelli, Marc Murphy, Amanda Freitag	"Thanksgiving Soup-er Stars" appetizer: leftover mashed potatoes, cranberry sauce, green beans, turkey	Scott Conant, Amanda Freitag, Aarón Sanchez	"Momumental" entrée: carrot baby food, mustard greens, pork butt, red quinoa	Marc Murphy, Maneet Chauhan, Alex Guarnaschelli
4	"Mac & Cheese, Grandpas, and Circus" July 26, 2016	"Mac & Cheese" appetizer: mac & cheese, Canadian bacon, Swiss chard, monkfish	Alex Guarnaschelli, Aarón Sanchez, Maneet Chauhan	"Battle of the Grandpas" entrée: London broil, rutabaga, broccoli rabe, peanut butter taffy bites	Scott Conant, Amanda Freitag, Aarón Sanchez	"Circus Spectacular" dessert: snow cone, popcorn, sour cream, funnel cake	Alex Guarnaschelli, Ron Ben-Israel, Scott Conant
5	"Pub Food, Holiday, and Mother-Daughter-In-Law" August 2, 2016	"In-Laws, in Teams!" appetizer: lasagna, onion blossom chips, arugula, wine purse	Amanda Freitag, Maneet Chauhan, Alex Guarnaschelli	"Holiday Cooking" entrée: beef tenderloin, gingersnap cocktail, potato latkes, tzimmes	Scott Conant, Aarón Sanchez, Geoffrey Zakarian	"Chopped Gastropub" appetizer: house-cured bacon, deviled eggs, fish cheeks, house-made pickles	Amanda Freitag, Marc Murphy, Alex Guarnaschelli
6	"Chocolate, Bizarre Foods, and Sweetness" August 9, 2016	"Chopped Desserts!" chocolate: Mississippi mud pie, maraschino cherries, brie, potato crisps	Alex Guarnaschelli, Geoffrey Zakarian, Maneet Chauhan	"Bizarre Battle" entrée: pork bung, hot sauce jelly beans, farro, pork dust	Aarón Sanchez, Marc Murphy, Chris Santos	"Cooking with Bass" dessert: zucchini, chocolate-covered raisins, peanut brittle, vanilla liqueur	Maneet Chauhan, Marc Murphy, Amanda Freitag

=== Season 3 ===
No.	Title/original air date	1st segment		2nd segment		3rd segment	
No.	Title/original air date	Ingredients	Competitors	Ingredients	Competitors	Ingredients	Competitors
1	"Dads, Whiskey and Wings, and Moms"	"Dads"	tbd	"Whiskey and Wings"	tbd	"Moms	tbd
2	"Star Power, Noodles, and Newlyweds"	"Star Power"	tbd	"Noodles"	tbd	"Newlyweds"	tbd
3	"Pickles, Tater, and Chocolate"	"Pickles"	tbd	"Tater"	tbd	"Chocolate"	tbd
4	"Dumplings, Hamachi, and Ugly Food"	"Dumplings"	tbd	"Hamachi"	tbd	"Ugly Food"	tbd
5	"Food Truck, Cornish Hens, and Grill"	"Food Truck"	tbd	"Cornish Hens"	tbd	"Grill"	tbd
