= Cristie Schoen =

Spanish chef

- Born: September 3, 1976; Madrid, Spain
- Died: March 12, 2015 (aged 38); Leicester, North Carolina, United States
- Spouse: Joseph "J.T." Codd (m. 2014; their deaths 2015)
- Culinary career
- Cooking style: Cajun cuisine

Cristie M. Schoen Codd (September 3, 1976 — March 12, 2015) was a Spanish-born American chef. She came to prominence as a contestant in the eighth season of the Food Network series Food Network Star.

Schoen and her husband Joseph were reported missing on March 15, 2015, when their family was unable to reach them. An investigation by police led to the arrest of local contractor Robert Jason Owens, who was charged with their murders. Owens was also a person of interest in the disappearance of Zebb Quinn in 2000, and was eventually charged with Quinn's murder in 2017. The authorities undertook a search of Owens' property; the couple's remains were found in his woodstove.

== Early life ==
Cristie Schoen was born in Madrid, Spain. She grew up cooking primarily Cajun cuisine with her father. Her father was in the U.S. Air Force and she moved around frequently, including stays in Louisiana, Mississippi and Texas.

== Food Network Star ==
In 2012, it was announced that Schoen had been selected as a contestant on the eighth season of the Food Network series Food Network Star. On May 13, 2012, she became the first contestant of the season to be eliminated, which she attested to her strong passion for cooking coming across as "angry". Following her appearance on the show, she stated to have remained close friends with fellow contestants Judson Allen, Josh Lyons and Kara Sigle.

== Personal life ==
Cristie's husband, Joseph "J.T." Codd, was a key grip; they married in 2014. At the time of her death, Cristie was five months pregnant with their first child, a girl, who was to be named Skylar.

== Murder ==
Cristie and Joseph were reported missing on March 15, 2015, when their family was unable to reach them. An investigation by police led to the arrest of local contractor Robert Jason Owens, who was charged with their murders. Owens is notable for being a person of interest in the disappearance of Zebb Quinn in 2000, and was eventually charged with Quinn's murder in 2017.

To date, no motive has been established for the murders of Cristie and Joseph Codd. While Owens reportedly admitted that he "struck and killed Codd" in the manner of vehicular homicide, the exact nature of Schoen's murder has not been released. Authorities undertook a search of Owens' property; the couple's remains were found in his woodstove. It was later concluded that the couple had been killed on March 12.

Owens' double-wide trailer burned down on March 24, 2015. On August 4, it was reported that the state of North Carolina would be seeking the death penalty for Owens if he is convicted.

Owens later admitted killing Cristie and Joseph Codd in March 2015. He also pleaded guilty to two counts of dismembering human remains. In a plea deal, his attorneys reached with North Carolina's Assistant Capital Attorney Victoria Jayne and Buncombe County's District Attorney Todd Williams, Owens was sentenced on April 27, 2017, to spend a minimum of 59.5 years to a maximum of 74.5 years in prison.
