= Food Network Star =

American food reality television series

- Genre: Food reality television
- Judges: Marc Summers; Bobby Flay; Giada De Laurentiis; Alton Brown
- Country of origin: United States
- No. of seasons: 14
- No. of episodes: 75

Production
- Production locations: New York City and Burbank, California
- Running time: 40–120 minutes
- Production companies: CBS EYEtoo Productions (Seasons 1–8); Triage Entertainment (Seasons 9–14)

Original release
- Network: Food Network
- Release: June 5, 2005 – August 5, 2018

Food Network Star is a reality television series that aired from June 5, 2005, to August 5, 2018. It was produced by CBS EYEtoo Productions for seasons 1–8 and by Triage Entertainment for seasons 9–14. It aired on the Food Network in the United States. Prior to season seven, the series was known as The Next Food Network Star.

== Season One ==
=== Summary ===
The first season of The Next Food Network Star series was taped in February 2005, and was composed of five episodes in June 2005. Chicago area caterers Dan Smith and Steve McDonagh emerged as the winners, and went on to host a show called Party Line with Dan & Steve; later titled Party Line with The Hearty Boys, which premiered on September 18, 2005.

The runner-up, Deborah Fewell, was chosen to host a special on food at beaches, Surf N Turf, which aired in June 2006. Michael Thomas was the recurring chef on The Tyra Banks Show. Susannah Locketti made an appearance on The Tony Danza Show, and is also an on-air chef for Publix grocery stores in the southern United States.

=== Contestants ===
Name	Age	Hometown	Place
Dan Smith & Steve McDonagh	42 and 40	Bellmore, NY and Wayne, NJ	Winners
Deborah Fewell	32	Los Angeles	Runner-up
Hans Rueffert	32	Jasper, GA	3rd
Susannah Locketti	33	Plymouth, MA	4th
Eric Warren	52	Los Angeles	5th
Michael Thomas	36	Venice, CA	6th
Harmony Marceau	30	New York City, NY	7th
Brook Harlan	24	Columbia, MO	8th

== Season Two ==
=== Summary ===
The second season of The Next Food Network Star series was taped in December 2005 and began airing in March 2006. Guy Fieri was announced as the winner on April 23, 2006, beating Reggie Southerland.

Fieri has achieved considerable success and a Daytime Emmy at Food Network since his victory, and is still regularly on air as of February 2026. Guy's Big Bite premiered in June 2006 and aired for 13 seasons until December 2016. Fieri's second series, Diners, Drive-Ins and Dives, premiered in April 2007 and has aired for 53 seasons, being the recipient of several Primetime Emmy Award nominations. He went on to the series, Ultimate Recipe Showdown, premiering February 17, 2008, and Guy Off The Hook on September 14, 2008. His reality competition Guy's Grocery Games debuted in October 2013 and has aired for 42 seasons.

Fourth-place contestant Nathan Lyon began hosting his own series, A Lyon In the Kitchen, on the Discovery Health Channel in March 2007.

Four of the seasons cast members along with Fieri reunited on Season 10 episode 4 of Guy’s Grocery Games which aired on July 31, 2016.

=== Contestants ===
Name	Age	Hometown	Culinary P.O.V.	Eliminated
Guy Fieri	38	Ferndale, CA	"Off the Hook" California Cuisine	Winner
Reggie Southerland	39	Los Angeles	Modern Soul Food	Runner-up
Carissa Seward	33	San Diego, CA	Simple Food for Entertaining	Week 6
Nathan Lyon	35	Los Angeles	Healthy and Seasonal Food	Week 5
Andrew Schumacher	26	Brooklyn, NY	Cooking Techniques	Week 4
Evette Rodriguez	35	Port St. Lucie, FL	Latin Cuisine	Week 3
Elizabeth Raynor	32	Sausalito, CA	Simple Mediterranean Cuisine	Week 2
Jess Dang	24	Menlo Park, CA	Asian Cuisine	Week 1

== Season Three ==
=== Summary ===
The third season began on June 3, 2007, and the winner was announced on Sunday, July 22. In season 3, judges sent 1 or 2 contestants home weekly. Once the field was down to 2 final contestants, the viewers picked the winner. Marc Summers (host of the first 2 seasons) only returned for this season's finale. Bobby Flay would host subsequent season finales.

During the season, the contestants lived in a shared house in New York City. The contestants' challenges included cooking concession food for an NBA game (with guest Darryl Dawkins) to a mini version of Food Network's Iron Chef America (with guest judges Bobby Flay and Cat Cora). The Selection Committee consisted of Food Network executives Bob Tuschman and Susie Fogelson along with one guest. Guest judges included Alton Brown, Giada De Laurentiis, Duff Goldman, season two winner Guy Fieri, and Robert Irvine.

Paula Deen and Rachael Ray participated in contestant challenges, and Bobby Flay also played a role in the guidance and selection process. Amy Finley was chosen by America as The Next Food Network Star on July 22, 2007. Her new show The Gourmet Next Door premiered on October 14, 2007, and ran for six episodes. Finley later declined to continue with the series, citing relocation to France for family reasons.

Among the contestants this season was former child actress Colombe Jacobsen-Derstine, best known for her appearances in the Mighty Ducks film franchise.

=== Contestants ===
Name	Age	Hometown	Occupation	Eliminated
Amy Finley	33	San Diego, CA	Stay-at-Home Mom	Winner^{1}
Rory Schepisi	31	Vega, TX	Restaurateur	Runner-Up
Joshua Adam "JAG" Garcia	25	Havelock, NC	Chef-de-Cuisine	Withdrew^{1}
Paul McCullough	36	Los Angeles	Caterer	Week 6
Adrien Sharp	29	Jackson, MI	Local Cooking Show Host	Week 5
Michael Salmon	53	Brooklyn, NY	Director of Operations for Macy's	Week 4
Tommy Grella Jr.	34	Methuen, MA	Self-Taught Chef	Week 3
Colombe Jacobsen-Derstine	29	New York, NY	Former Child Actress	Week 3
Nikki Shaw	38	Oakland, CA	Caterer	Week 2
Patrick Rolfe	33	Seattle, WA	Chef	Week 1
Vivien Cunha	40	Hermosa Beach, CA	Caterer	Week 1

^Note 1: Amy Finley was eliminated Week 7, and the original finalists were Rory Schepisi and Joshua "JAG" Garcia. After the final elimination episode was aired, evidence came to light that JAG had lied about both his culinary training and his military service, representing both as more extensive than they actually were. Food Network allowed him to withdraw from the competition and reinstated Amy Finley, who was voted The Next Food Network Star.

== Season Four ==
=== Summary ===
Season four of The Next Food Network Star premiered on Sunday, June 1, 2008. Food Network executives Bob Tuschman and Susie Fogelson are joined by Bobby Flay as the selection committee for this season. Each new episode aired on Sundays at 10:00 PM EDT. For this season, the viewers no longer received the chance to vote for the winner; producers instead made the final decision. This led to an error by FoodNetwork.com, which briefly posted the winning moment video on their website three days before the finale aired. The winner for the fourth season was Aaron McCargo Jr. His winning show idea, Big Daddy's House, first aired August 3, 2008.

Finalist Adam Gertler was hired to host a Food Network show called Will Work for Food, which debuted on January 19, 2009, and was cancelled after one season. He hosted the Food Network show Kid in a Candy Store, which aired two seasons.

Kelsey Nixon co-hosted a web show on food2.com (a Food Network sister site aka Cooking Channel) and also appeared in the premiere of Chefs vs. City in 2009. In 2010, Gertler and Nixon became co-hosts of The Next Food Network Star After Party, a half-hour recap/interview show following that night's episode of Star, on Cooking Channel. Nixon stars in Kelsey's Essentials, a program on kitchen and cooking basics for The Cooking Channel that ran November, 2010–2013.

=== Contestants ===
Name	Age	Hometown	Occupation	Eliminated
Aaron McCargo Jr.	36	Camden, NJ	Chef	Winner
Adam Gertler	30	Philadelphia, PA	Food Server	Runner-Up
Lisa Garza	32	Dallas, TX	Restaurateur/Designer	Runner-Up
Kelsey Nixon	23	North Ogden, UT	Assistant Culinary Director	Week 7
Shane Lyons	20	Colorado Springs, CO	Private Chef and actor	Week 6
Jennifer Cochrane	32	Woonsocket, RI	Chef	Week 5
Nipa Bhatt	35	Victoria, MN	Marketing Manager	Week 4
Jeffrey Vaden	43	White Plains, NY	Food Service Management	Week 3
Kevin Roberts	39	San Diego, CA	Radio Talk Show Host/Restaurant Owner/Author	Week 2
Cory Kahaney	45	New York, NY	Stand-up Comedian	Week 1

== Season Five ==
=== Summary ===
Season five of The Next Food Network Star premiered on June 7, 2009. Food Network executives Bob Tuschman and Susie Fogelson were joined by Bobby Flay as the Selection Committee for this season, which was filmed early 2009 in New York, New York and Miami, Florida. Melissa D'Arabian was declared the winner on August 2, 2009, with the title for her show being Ten Dollar Dinners. Her show premiered on August 9, 2009.

On August 17, 2009, Food Network announced Jeffrey Saad would return in a series of online videos based on his pilot, now called "The Spice Smuggler." The program premiered with four 4 1/2-minute videos featuring one spice and a recipe incorporating it. Saad was named the national representative for the American Egg Board. In November, 2010, Saad debuted in a new show for The Cooking Channel titled United Tastes of America, which explores multiple aspects of traditional American food.

Finalist Debbie Lee has carried her "Seoul to Soul" concept to the streets of L.A., opening a lunch truck, Ahn-Joo, featuring a range of Korean food.

=== Contestants ===
Name	Age	Hometown	Occupation	Culinary P.O.V.	Eliminated
Melissa d'Arabian	40	Keller, TX	Stay-At-Home Mom	"Kitchen Survival Guide"	Winner
Jeffrey Saad	42	Los Angeles, California	Restaurateur/Food Consultant/Recipe Developer/Chef	"Ingredient Smuggler"	Runner-Up
Debbie Lee	39	West Hollywood, California	Restaurant Consultant	"From Seoul to Soul"	Week 8
Jamika Pessoa	30	Atlanta, Georgia	Personal Chef/Businesswoman	Caribbean Cuisine	Week 7
Michael Proietti	28	City Island, NY	Executive Chef	"Global A Go-Go"	Week 6
Katie Cavuto	30	Philadelphia, PA	Personal Chef & Dietician	Healthy and Green Cuisine	Week 5
Teddy Folkman	33	Alexandria, VA	Restaurant Owner/Executive Chef	"Gourmet Bar Food"	Week 4
Eddie Gilbert	30	Los Angeles	Apprentice Chef	"Modernized Traditional Food"	Week 3
Brett August	33	New York, New York	Executive Sous Chef	Italian-American Cuisine	Week 2
Jen Isham	30	Orlando, FL	Sales Manager	"Housewife 2.0"	Week 1

== Season Six ==
=== Summary ===
The sixth season of the series premiered on Sunday, June 6, 2010. Food Network executives Bob Tuschman and Susie Fogelson were again joined by Bobby Flay as judges; in addition, Giada De Laurentiis served as an on-set mentor. On July 17, 2010, a post-competition recap and discussion show premiered on The Cooking Channel. Shows were filmed in Los Angeles, California and New York, New York.

On August 15, 2010, Aarti Sequeira was declared the winner, and her new show Aarti Party premiered on Sunday, August 22, 2010, and features American style cuisine with unique Indian flair. Season 2 of Aarti Party premiered that December.

The Food Network also signed runner-up Tom Pizzica to host a new show called Outrageous Food, which premiered in November 2010. The last new episodes of Aarti Party aired in mid-2013.

=== Contestants ===
Name	Age	Hometown	Occupation	Culinary P.O.V.	Eliminated
Aarti Sequeira	31	Los Angeles, California	Food Blogger	"Aarti Paarti"	Winner
Herb Mesa	41	Atlanta, Georgia	Personal Trainer/Personal Chef	"Cooking Con Sabor"	Runner-Up
Tom Pizzica	32	San Francisco, CA	Unemployed Chef	"Big Chef"	Runner-Up
Aria Kagan	30	Hollywood, FL	Private Chef	"Family Style"	Week 9
Brad Sorenson	25	Austin, Texas	Professional Chef	"Pro"/"Culinary Quest"	Week 8
Serena Palumbo	31	New York, New York	Attorney	"Serena's Trattoria"	Week 7
Brianna Jenkins	30	Atlanta, Georgia	Caterer	"Sexy and Fabulous Flavors"	Week 6
Paul Young	32	Chicago, IL	Waiter	"Blue-Collar Dollar"	Week 5
Darrell "DAS" Smith	28	Los Angeles	High School Culinary Teacher	"Food is the Life of the Party"	Week 4
Dzintra Dzenis	44	Austin, TX	Private Cooking Instructor		Week 3
Doreen Fang	38	Los Angeles	Caterer/Cooking Instructor	"Simply Complex"	Week 2
Alexis Hernandez	40	Clarksville, IN	Part-time food Writer		Week 1

== Season Seven ==
=== Summary ===
For the seventh season, the reality television series was renamed, after the first episode, Food Network Star, dropping the word "Next". It premiered Sunday, June 5, 2011. Food Network executives Bob Tuschman and Susie Fogelson were joined again by Bobby Flay and Giada De Laurentiis as the judges for this season. The series was filmed in Los Angeles, California and New York, New York.

Season seven winner Jeff Mauro's show "Sandwich King" premiered on Sunday, August 21, 2011. In spring 2013, Jeff hosted $24 in 24, a show in which he went to several cities and ate an entire day's worth of meals on 24 dollars. Mauro is currently a co-host on "The Kitchen", airing Saturday mornings on Food Network with cohosts Sunny Anderson, Katie Lee and Geoffrey Zakarian.

=== Contestants ===
Name	Age	Hometown	Occupation	Culinary P.O.V.	Eliminated
Jeff Mauro	32	Chicago, IL	Corporate Chef	"Sandwich King"	Winner
Susie Jimenez	31	Carbondale, CO	Catering Company Owner	"Spice It Up"	Runner-Up
Vic "Vegas" Moea	36	Brooklyn, NY	Executive Chef	"Mama's Boy"	Week 11
Mary Beth Albright	38	Washington, DC	Food Writer and Blogger	"Sunday Supper"	Week 10
Whitney Chen	28	New York, NY	Chef	"Four Star Flair"	Week 9
Jyll Everman	31	Glendora, CA	Caterer	"Jyllicious Bites"	Week 8
Penny Davidi	39	Los Angeles	Restaurant Owner	"Stilettos in the Kitchen"/"Middle Eastern Mama"	Week 7
Chris Nirschel	28	Hoboken, NJ	Sous Chef	"On the Line"	Week 7
Orchid Paulmeier	38	Bluffton, SC	Restaurant Owner	"Asian Persuasion"	Week 6
Justin Davis	31	Minneapolis, MN	Food Blogger	"The Flavor Factory"	Week 5
Justin Balmes	32	Marietta, GA	Fishmonger/ Butcher	"Kitchen Workshop"	Week 4
Alicia Sanchez	33	New York, NY	Young Adult Culinary Teacher	"Alicia's Guilty Pleasures"	Week 3
Katy Clark	34	Long Beach, CA	Food and Fitness Company Operator	"Simply Fabulous"	Week 2
Juba Kali	29	New Orleans, LA	Research Chef	"Cuisine Made Simply"	Week 2
Howie Drummond	40	Highlands Ranch, CO	Radio Host	"Basic and Delicious"	Week 1

== Season Eight ==
=== Summary ===
Season 8 started May 13, 2012. For season 8, the format changed, with the contestants divided into three five-member teams, each coached by a Food Network host, either Bobby Flay, Alton Brown, or Giada De Laurentiis. Coaches worked with the teams as they prepared for and completed their tasks. The winner's coach would also be the producer of the winner's show.

Each week, a winning team was selected, and one member of the teams that did not win was up for elimination in a new feature called Producers' Challenge. Each challenge was hosted by current Food Network personalities.

The final winner was decided by an audience vote cast on foodnetwork.com between July 15–17, 2012 and the winner was announced on July 22, 2012. The winner was Justin Warner, who hosted a one-hour special on The Food Network, but did not have a series produced. He has become a blogger on foodnetwork.com, makes appearances at Food Network events, and is an active Twitter presence.

=== Coaches ===
- Alton Brown – host of Good Eats, Iron Chef America, The Next Iron Chef, and Cutthroat Kitchen.
- Bobby Flay – host of Grill It! with Bobby Flay, Throwdown! with Bobby Flay. Co-host of season 3 of Worst Cooks in America and Iron Chef on Iron Chef America
- Giada De Laurentiis – host of Everyday Italian, Giada at Home and Giada in Italy.

=== Contestants ===
Name	Age	Hometown	Occupation	Culinary P.O.V.	Team	Eliminated
Justin Warner	27	Brooklyn, NY	Chef and Restaurant Owner	"Rebel with a Culinary Cause"	Team Alton	Winner
Michele Ragussis	42	Brooklyn, NY	Executive Chef	"My New England"	Team Bobby	Runner-Up
Yvan Lemoine	30	New York City	Bartender and Cook for the French Consulate	"Family Style"	Team Giada	Runner-Up
Martie Duncan	50	Birmingham, AL	Blogger and Party Planner	"Martie with the Party"	Team Alton	Runner-Up
Philip "Ippy" Aiona	23	Kamuela, HI	Executive Chef	"Voyage to Paradise"	Team Giada	Week 10
Nikki Martin	31	West Hollywood, CA	Private Chef, Food and Beverage Consultant	"The Grill Next Door"	Team Bobby	Week 10
Martita Jara	35	San Diego, CA	Self-Taught Chef	"Martita's Mesa"	Team Giada	Week 9
Malcolm Mitchell	41	Washington, DC	Private Chef	"Simple and Soulful"	Team Bobby	Week 8
Emily Ellyn	29	Orlando, FL	College Student	"Cooking Retro Rad"	Team Alton	Week 7
Linkie Marais	28	North Attleborough, MA	Cake Baker	"Dessert Queen"	Team Giada	Week 6
Judson Allen	30	Chicago, IL	Catering Company Owner	"Weight Loss Journey"	Team Alton	Week 5
Eric Lee	44	Petaluma, CA	Winery Executive Chef	"Handcrafted in Wine Country"	Team Bobby	Week 4
Josh Lyons	42	Jupiter, FL	Restaurant Consultant and Sushi Chef	"Wok and Roll"	Team Giada	Week 3
Kara Sigle	31	Chicago, IL	Catering Company Owner	"Nostalgic Cooking with a Twist"	Team Bobby	Week 2
Cristie Schoen	35	New Orleans, LA	Caterer	"Healthy and Delicious"	Team Alton	Week 1

== Season Nine ==
=== Summary ===
Season 9 started on June 2, 2013. For season 9, Alton Brown, Bobby Flay, and Giada De Laurentiis mentored and judged twelve Food Network Star competitors, although the contestants were not divided into teams as in season 8. Many of this season's contestants had previously appeared on other Food Network shows. The winner was Damaris Phillips, decided by an audience vote cast on foodnetwork.com and announced live on August 11, 2013. Phillips hosted the Food Network show Southern at Heart for five seasons from 2013 to 2016. In 2018, she began co-hosting The Bobby and Damaris Show on Food Network with Bobby Flay. Phillips also cohosted "Southern and Hungry" with auto racing analyst Rutledge Wood in 2017.

=== Contestants ===
Name	Age	Hometown	Occupation	Culinary P.O.V.	Eliminated
Damaris Phillips	30	Louisville, KY	Culinary Teacher	"Modern Southern Food"	Winner
Rodney Henry	47	Baltimore, MD	Pie Shop Owner	"Pie Style"	Runner-up
Russell Jackson	49	San Francisco, CA	Underground Chef	"Seven Culinary Sins"	Runner-up
Stacey Poon-Kinney	34	San Diego, CA	Restaurant Owner	"Vintage with a Modern Twist"	Week 10
Nikki Dinki	29	New York, NY	Food Blogger/Online Host	"Semi-Vegetarian" / "Meat on the Side"	Week 9
Connie "Lovely" Jackson	27	Los Angeles	Caterer	"Party on a Plate"	Week 4 & Week 8 (Winner of Star Salvation)
Chad Rosenthal	37	Ambler, PA	Restaurant Owner	"Jewish BBQ Guy"	Week 7
Chris Hodgson	26	Cleveland, OH	Chef/Restaurateur	"Compassion for Food"	Week 6
Viet Pham	33	Salt Lake City, UT	Chef/Restaurant Owner	"The American Dream"	Week 5
Danushka Lysek	37	New York, NY	Private Chef/Model	"Your Private Chef"	Week 3
Andres Guillama	26	Waynesville, NC	Childhood Obesity Prevention Coach	"Teaching Men to Cook"	Week 2
Daniela Perez-Reyes	28	Haleiwa, HI	Bartender/Caterer	"Peruvian Princess"	Week 1

== Season Ten ==
The winner was Lenny McNab, decided by an audience vote cast on foodnetwork.com and announced live on August 10, 2014. It is the last season to date where the finale aired live—all subsequent season finales would be filmed months in advance prior to airing.

=== Contestants ===
Name	Age	Hometown	Occupation	Culinary P.O.V.	Eliminated
Lenny McNab	42	De Beque, CO	Executive Chef	Gourmet Cowboy	Winner
Luca Della Casa	38	San Antonio, TX (Originally from Turin, Italy)	Restaurateur	Luca's Feast	Episode 2 (Winner of Star Salvation) Runner-up
Nicole Gaffney	29	Atlantic City, New Jersey	Private Chef	Coastal Cuisine	Runner-up
Sarah Penrod	30	League City, TX	Private Chef	Devoted to Date Night/Texas Cuisine	Episode 10
Loreal Gavin	26	Indianapolis, IN	Butcher	Butcher Babe	Episode 9
Emma Frisch	30	Ithaca, NY	Farmer	Farm-to-Table	Episode 8
Chris Kyler	32	Stafford, VA	Caterer	elevating classics	Episode 7
Reuben Ruiz	27	Miami, FL	Restaurant Owner	Flavors of Miami	Episode 6
Christopher Lynch	39	New Orleans, LA	Executive Chef	New Orleans Inspired	Episode 5
Aryen Moore-Alston	31	Memphis, TN	Home Cook	International Cuisine Made Easy	Episode 4
Kenny Lao	36	New York, NY	Food Truck Chef	Fast-Casual	Episode 3
Donna Sonkin Shaw	42	New York, NY	Nutritionist	Healthy Comfort Food	Episode 1

== Season Eleven ==
Beginning with this season, Alton Brown no longer appeared as a judge. The winner was Eddie Jackson, an ex NFL player and MasterChef contestant.

=== Contestants ===
Name	Age	Hometown	Occupation	Culinary P.O.V.	Eliminated
Eddie Jackson	34	Houston, TX	Food Truck Owner	Caribbean	Winner
Jay Ducote	33	Baton Rouge, LA	Radio Host	Louisiana	Runner up
Dominick "Dom" Tesoriero	31	Staten Island, NY	Food Truck Owner	Italian	Week 8 (Winner of Star Salvation; returned for semi-final) Runner up
Arnold Myint	38	Nashville, TN	Restaurant Owner	Effortless Home Entertainment	Week 10
Alex McCoy	31	Washington, D.C.	Chef, Restaurant Owner	Fusion Sandwiches	Week 9
Michelle Karam	39	Santa Barbara, CA	Food Blogger	Mediterranean	Week 7 (withdrew)
Emilia Cirker	36	Reston, VA	Culinary Instructor	Spice Class	Week 6
Rue Rusike	26	Brooklyn, NY	Private Chef	South African	Week 5
Rosa Graziano	38	Los Angeles	Food Truck Owner	Southern Italian	Week 4
Sita Lewis	47	New York, NY	Culinary Instructor	Italian Soul	Week 3
Matthew Grunwald	22	Scottsdale, AZ	Restaurant Chef	Hashtag	Week 2
Christina Fitzgerald	29	St. Louis, MO	Executive Chef	Around The World	Week 1

== Season Twelve ==
Martita Jara originally competed in the eighth season of the series; she returned after winning the pre-season competition Comeback Kitchen.

=== Contestants ===
Name	Age	Hometown	Occupation	Eliminated
Tregaye Fraser	31	Atlanta, Georgia	Caterer	Winner
Jernard Wells	37	Atlanta, Georgia	Executive chef	Runner-up
Damiano Carrara	30	Moorpark, California	Pastry chef	Runner-up
Yaku Moton-Spruill (Note: Yaku Moton-Spruill returned to the competition in Week 10 of season 12 after winning Star Salvation, but was again eliminated midway through the latter episode.)	33	San Francisco, California	Basketball player, sous chef	Week 4 / Week 10
Ana Quincoces	49	Coral Gables, Florida	Cookbook writer, attorney	Week 9
Erin Campbell	24	Woodbury, Minnesota	Baker	Week 8
Joy Thompson	40	Thomasville, North Carolina	Baker, restaurateur	Week 7
Rob Burmeister	45	Staten Island, New York	School lunch administrator	Week 6
Monterey Salka	26	Nashville, Tennessee	Caterer	Week 5
Martita Jara	39	San Diego, California	Home cook	Week 3
Aaron Crumbaugh	36	Spokane, Washington	Caterer	Week 2
Melissa Pfeister	34	Los Angeles, California	Basketball player	Week 2
Havird Usry	28	Augusta, Georgia	Restaurateur	Week 1

== Season Thirteen ==
Matthew Grunwald originally competed in season 11. He returned for a second chance after winning the Comeback Kitchen competition.

=== Contestants ===
Name	Age	Hometown	Occupation	Eliminated
Jason Smith	39	Grayson, Kentucky	Cafeteria manager	Winner
Rusty Hamlin	42	Atlanta, Georgia	Executive chef	Runner-up
Cory Bahr	40	Monroe, Louisiana	Chef (Note: Cory Bahr returned to the competition in Week 10 of season 13 after winning Star Salvation.)	Runner-up
Matthew Grunwald	24	Scottsdale, Arizona	Restaurant chef	Week 10
Amy Pottinger	32	Honolulu, Hawaii	Food blogger	Week 9
David Rose	35	Atlanta, Georgia	Caterer	Week 7
Addie Gundry	30	Lake Forest, Illinois	Cookbook author; chef	Week 6
Caodan Tran	29	Dallas, Texas	Personal chef	Week 5
Trace Barnett	27	Brilliant, Alabama	Food blogger	Week 4
Suzanne Lossia	32	Detroit, Michigan	Restaurant Owner & Personal chef	Week 3
Toya Boudy	34	New Orleans, Louisiana	Restaurant Owner & Personal chef	Week 2
Nancy Manlove	65	Texas City, Texas	Chef	Week 2
Blake Baldwin	30	Flemington, New Jersey	Marketing manager; home cook	Week 1

== Season Fourteen ==
=== Contestants ===
This season features Manny Washington and Katie Dixon from MasterChef and Palak Patel who beat Bobby Flay. Amy Pottinger originally competed in season 13. She returned for a second chance after winning the Comeback Kitchen competition, along with Adam Gertler, who originally competed in season four.

Name	Age	Hometown	Occupation	Eliminated
Christian Petroni	34	Port Chester, New York	Chef	Winner
Jess Tom	34	Princeton, New Jersey	Food Novelist (Note: Tom won Star Salvation in Week 8 of season 14 to be reinstated in the competition.)	Winner
Manny Washington	30	Orlando, Florida	Firehouse cook	Runner-up
Amy Pottinger	33	Honolulu, Hawaii	Food Blogger	Week 8
Palak Patel	38	New York, New York	Personal chef	Week 7
Katie Dixon	35	Hattiesburg, Mississippi	Private chef	Week 6
Harrison Bader	26	Los Angeles, California	Personal chef	Week 4
Adam Gertler	40	Los Angeles, California	Chef, TV Personality, Actor, Podcaster	Week 4
Rebekah Lingenfelser	34	Savannah, Georgia	Marketing and Public Relations director	Week 3
Samone Lett	46	Sanford, Florida	Personal chef and caterer	Week 2
Jason Goldstein	40	New York, New York	Chiropractor; culinary teacher	Week 1
Chris Valdes	26	Miami, Florida	Caterer	Week 1
