= 24 Hour Restaurant Battle =

American food reality television series

- Genre: Cooking
- Directed by: Michael Pearlman
- Presented by: Scott Conant
- Judges: see list below
- Country of origin: United States
- Original language: English
- No. of seasons: 2
- No. of episodes: 18

Production
- Executive producer: Larry Hochberg
- Producers: Deborah Climie; Kate Ward; Sam Cotler; Graham McKay; Diana Morelli; Dustin Drury; Ines Tudday; Rachel Martin; Kate Dermody
- Production location: New York City
- Editor: Erinnisse Heuer
- Camera setup: multiple-camera setup
- Running time: 60 minutes
- Production company: CBS Eye Productions

Original release
- Network: Food Network
- Release: July 18, 2010 – June 23, 2011

24 Hour Restaurant Battle is a Food Network reality based cooking television series hosted by Scott Conant that features two teams competing against each other for a shot at their own restaurant.

== Series overview ==
Opening: "It's the ultimate dream for master chefs and home cooks alike to open your own restaurant. Now two teams will compete to transform an empty space into the restaurant they've always wanted. But they'll have to do this in 24 hours. Once the doors open, they'll be judged by their customers, a panel of experts, and me, Scott Conant, chef and restaurateur. It's an all out war of culinary skill, business savvy, and pure determination. This is 24 Hour Restaurant Battle...It's two teams one dream and 24 hours to make it happen".

Criteria: 24 Hours until the doors open: 1. Create a concept. 2. Plan Menu. 3. Design and shop for front of the house. 4. Manage kitchen and waitstaff.

In each episode, two teams of two or three people compete. Each team must turn a blank space into a restaurant in 24 hours. The teams are responsible for a concept, decor, and food. Each team's menu must include at least one Appetizer, Entrée and Dessert, but there is no maximum limit for any course as long as it fits within their budget. Both teams get a $4,000 budget for food and decor. Each team also gets painters to color the walls, one sous chef to help assist the cooking, and waiters to seat people at tables and deliver food. After 24 hours, the restaurant's doors are open to diners who get to choose the restaurant they would like to attend based on the menu and decor. Four judges eat at both restaurants and Conant determines a winner based on the "concept, execution and viability" of the restaurant. The winning team gets $10,000 to invest into creating their own restaurant.

Note: For episodes starting on September 15, 2010, the teams received $5,000 instead of $4,000 and Geoffrey Zakarian was designated as the head judge.

== Judges ==
The judges change each episode (except for Scott Conant), though they are from a selection of 9 restaurateurs and critics:

- Karine Bakhoum - Food critic
- Alison Brod - Restaurant trend expert, restaurant publicist (Alison Brod PR)
- Jason Denton - Chef
- Gabriella Gershenson - Food writer/editor for Saveur magazine
- Ben Leventhal - Food blogger
- Drew Nieporent -
- Marcus Samuelsson - Chef/Restaurateur
- Steve Schussler -
- David Sax - Author of Save the Deli: In Search of Perfect Pastrami, Crusty Rye, and the Heart of Jewish Delicatessen
- Geoffrey Zakarian - Chef/NYC Restaurateur

== Episodes ==
=== Season 1 (2010) ===
No.	Title	Winners	Original release date
1	"Italiano Battle"	Rossella, Angela, and Nonna (Da Rossella)	July 18, 2010
In the series premiere, three generations of Italian women from Brooklyn (Rossella, Angela, and Nonna) who serve up authentic Italian food at Da Rossella battles against a brother, sister, and best friend team (Anthony, Debra Jean, and Chris) from Connecticut who put a modern twist on traditional Italian dishes in their restaurant, Pesto.
2	"All In the Family Battle"	Mookie and Saoul	July 21, 2010
Two brothers (Mookie and Saoul) compete against a mother/daughter duo in a family-style battle.
3	"High Skills Battle"	Barbara and Lisa	July 28, 2010
Two experienced teams from Illinois and Texas test out their skills in a cooking competition. One has ambitious plans for a European bistro, while the other wants to open a modern piano bar featuring regional American cuisine.
4	"Best Friends Battle"	Danushka and Angela	August 4, 2010
A team of Private chefs play it safe with a small rustic menu that evokes childhood memories, while best friends from Massachusetts pack their ambitious menu with authentic Sicilian cuisine.
5	"Couples Battle"	J.J. and Justin	August 11, 2010
A couple from Philadelphia serve retro comfort food in their 1950s-inspired eatery, while a New York City couple open a brunch place specializing in sweet and savory jellies.
6	"Home Cooks Battle"	Andrew and Lad (Noy)	August 18, 2010
A father and son (Lad and Andrew) with a Filipino-American concept called 'Noy go up against two best friends (Neeka and Dorinda) with a menu that they describe is "not your grandmother's vegetarian" restaurant named (Alive).
7	"Texas vs. Ex's Battle"	Mitchell and Sara (The Q Company)	August 25, 2010
A battle pits two couples with failed business experiences against each other. One plans to open a Latino restaurant called Lulabah (Chris and Francisco). While the other (Mitchel and Sara) revives their old food truck named The Q Company, a Texas BBQ restaurant.
8	"Theme Restaurants Battle"	Aaron Seelbinder and Baylor Ferrier (A&B Filling Station)	September 1, 2010
The first theme restaurant battle has begun with two different concepts, including one that is "trailer chic" and one that's inspired by cavemen by serving prehistoric barbecue.

=== Season 2 (2011) ===
No.	Title	Winners	Original release date
9	"Battle of the Exes"	Michele and Davina (Avery Point)	April 21, 2011
Two former flames reunite once again to compete in a battle of the exes. Philadelphia exes Laura and Eric of Magdalene with their small plates of international flavor face off against another former couple, Michele and Davina from Brooklyn who serves traditional New England cuisine from their hometown of Connecticut in their restaurant called Avery Point (named after Avery Point Lighthouse).
10	"Traditions Battle"	Alan and Jonathan (Jak's Diner)	April 28, 2011
Traditional Greek diner vs. "Southern fare with a flare". Brothers from New Jersey, (Jak's Diner) focus on Jersey diner favorites, including moussaka and cheesecake, while longtime friends Hope and Natalie serve Southern comfort food, from fried game hen to beignets, at their eatery, Savor.
11	"Asian Food Battle"	Meghna and Maiki (Piper)	May 5, 2011
Two Asian eateries go head-to-head in an all-Asian battle. Chicago natives Anna and Stephaine serve up Thai street food staples in their restaurant Street, while Meghna and Maiki (Piper) focuses on Vietnamese and Indian comfort foods.
12	"Twins Battle"	Sylvia and Sandra (Allegria)	May 12, 2011
Two sets of identical twins face off against each other in a twins battle. One pair, Sylvia and Sandra from Australia serve their grandmother's traditional Spanish tapas recipes in their eatery called Allegria, while the other pair, Chicago bar owners Daniel and David put an innovative twist on American comfort food in their rustic restaurant called Vintage Social Club.
13	"Deli Battle"	TBD	May 19, 2011
Two teams who want to open their own Jewish deli compete to see who has the best deli food.
14	"Themed Restaurant Battle"	TBD	May 26, 2011
The second theme restaurant battle is on when two teams open their own theme restaurant, which include a German beer hall, and a gastropub.
15	"Grill vs. BBQ (Outback)"	Michael and Katie (The Garage)	June 2, 2011
Best friends serve authentic fajitas at their Tex-Mex restaurant (Texas Fajita Co.), while a husband-and-wife team have homemade brisket on the menu of their traditional Texas barbecue joint (The Garage).
16	"Battle of Modern Cuisine"	TBD	June 9, 2011
Two modern eateries compete, including one specializing in molecular gastronomy and one with a social conscience.
17	"Firehouse Cooks"	TBD	June 16, 2011
Two NYFD fraternity brothers from Brooklyn who own a steak and seafood restaurant (Seven-20), and twin brother firefighters from northern California with their classy comfort food (Enigma) go against each other in a battle of who is the best firehouse cook.
18	"City vs. Country"	Fred and Marcus (Citizen)	June 23, 2011
Girls (Dana and Nikki from Los Angeles, CA) versus boys (Fred and Marcus from Dallas, TX) in a battle of French bistro (The Famished Lamb) against gluten-free country cuisine (Citizen).
