= Nathan Lyon (chef) =

American chef and television personality

Nathan Lyon is an American chef and television personality. He hosted the Discovery Health television series A Lyon in the Kitchen.

A native of Arlington, Virginia, Lyon earned an undergraduate degree at James Madison University. He began working in the food industry at the Army Navy Country Club in Arlington as a soldier, and then as a cafe manager. He attended the California School of Culinary Arts and then worked in several restaurants in Los Angeles. Lyon launched a personal chef business and worked four days a week at a farmers' market. He became a finalist on the Food Network television reality series The Next Food Network Star in 2005. Lyon lost to Guy Fieri (with whom he became close friends during the competition), but began hosting a series by Discovery Health called A Lyon in the Kitchen. The show emphasizes fresh ingredients and fresh food, with the tagline "Great food starts fresh."

Lyon began shooting a show on PBS called Growing a Greener World and was filming season 3. He is also in the process of filming a new travel/food TV show for the Veria network.

Lyon published his first cookbook, Great Food Starts Fresh, in December 2011.
