= Justin Warner =

American chef

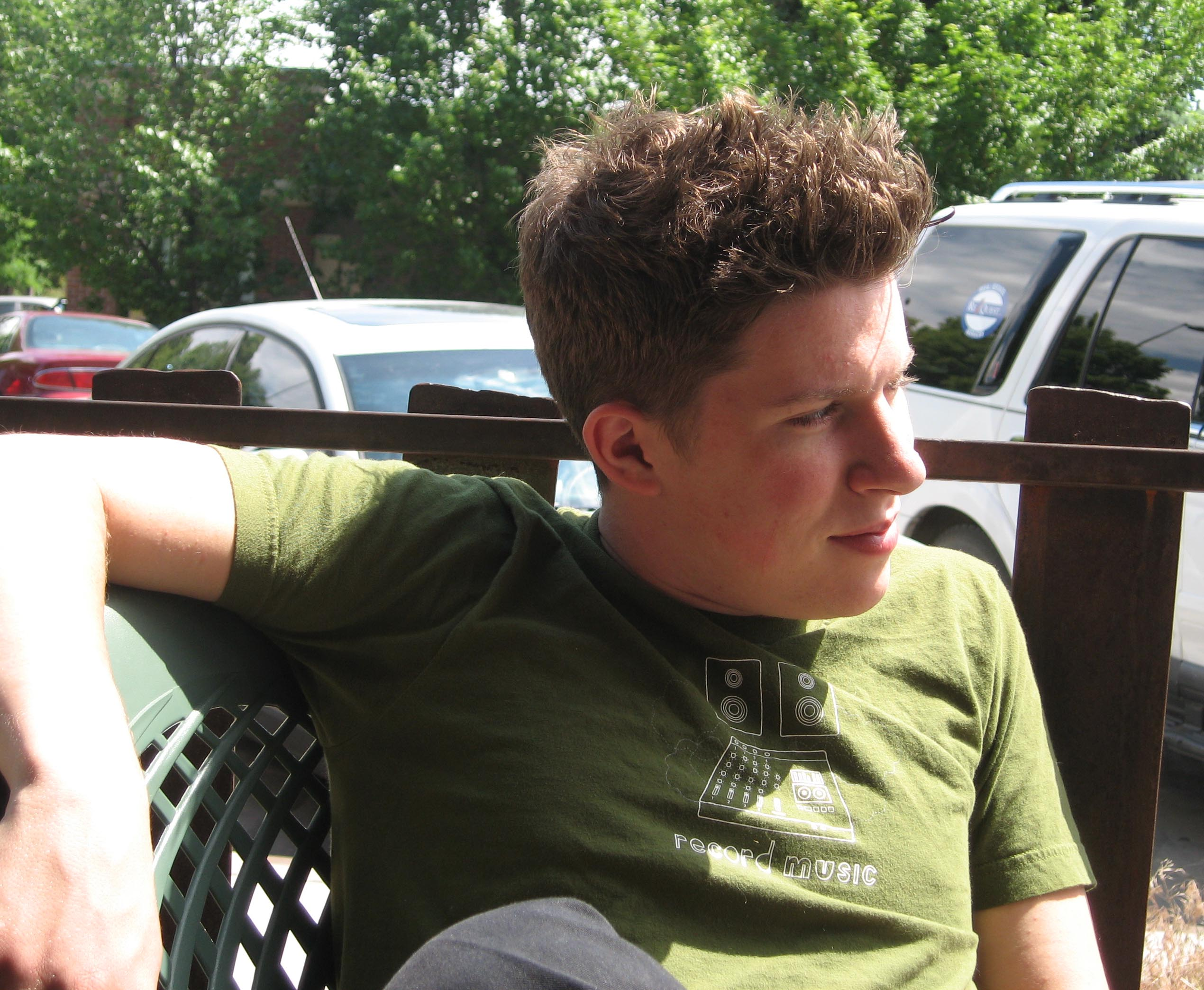
- Warner in 1996
- Born: February 11, 1984 (age 42); Hagerstown, Maryland, US
- Spouse(s): Brooke Sweeten (2015–)
- Culinary career
- Cooking style: Fine Dining, Ramen
- Current restaurant(s): Bokujo Ramen, bb's natural Rapid City, SD
- Television show: Rebel Eats (2013)
- Award won: Michelin Bib Gourmand
- Website: https://www.instagram.com/eatfellowhumans http://www.twitch.tv/ChefShock

Justin M. Warner (born February 11, 1984) is an American cookbook author and television personality. He is best known for his appearances on Food Network, including the eighth season of the series Food Network Star, which he won. He is the author of The Laws of Cooking: And How to Break Them (2015). He is also the host of Eat the Universe on marvel.com where he makes meals inspired by characters of the Marvel Universe.

== Early life ==
Warner was born on February 11, 1984 in Hagerstown, Maryland. His mother, Jan, is a schoolteacher, and his father was a psychiatrist. Warner was born when his father was 57 years old. In 1998 he was a finalist in the National Spelling Bee. His father died shortly after Justin graduated from South Hagerstown High School in 2002.

Warner has had no formal culinary training; he was inspired to learn to cook by his father.

== Food Network ==
Warner appeared on 24 Hour Restaurant Battle in August 2010 with his then-girlfriend J.J. Pyle. They won the episode with their brunch restaurant concept, but the restaurant itself never came to fruition.

=== Food Network Star ===
Later in 2012 Warner became a contestant on the eighth season of Food Network Star, mentored by Alton Brown. He did not watch the series before becoming a contestant, because he does not own a television. He eventually became one of the final four contestants, and he filmed a pilot for a potential series called Rebel with a Culinary Cause. He won the competition. Alton Brown announced on January 4, 2013, that he will "regrettably" not be producing Justin's show. In March 2013, Justin Warner debuted a one-hour pilot special on Food Network titled Rebel Eats. In 2014, he was a judge on Guy's Grocery Games.

== Career ==
He was one of the co-owners of Do or Dine restaurant in Bed-Stuy, New York, before it closed in September 2015.

In 2021, Justin and his wife Brooke opened "Bokujo Ramen", in Rapid City, South Dakota. It combines their love of Japanese food, with local ingredients.

Starting October 31, 2016, Warner, along with a few others acting as staff, created a new cooking show on Twitch.tv known as Chefshock, "Shockingly Real, Shockingly Live, and just plain Shockingly Delicious.", where he cooks live from his home kitchen from completely raw ingredients with viewers encouraged to cook along and ask questions. Questions are often presented to Warner by a moderator who shares in eating the finished results, while those that cook along and post their own progress pictures are featured throughout the show during lulls in the cooking process. Ingredients required to cook along at home are shared a week in advance, usually through the use of google documents to allow those that wish to participate time to gather them.

== Personal life ==
On June 29, 2015, Justin Warner married his fiancée Brooke Sweeten.

== Filmography ==
Television
| Year | Series | Role | Notes |
|---|---|---|---|
| 2010 | 24 Hour Restaurant Battle | Himself | Episode winner with partner J.J. |
| 2012 | Food Network Star | Himself | Contestant: Season 8 |
| 2012 | Unique Eats | Himself | Season 4 episode 7: "Comfort Food" |
| 2013 | Rebel Eats | Himself/host | |
| 2014 | Unique Sweets | Himself | |
| 2014–present | Guy's Grocery Games | Himself | Recurring judge/competitor |
| 2015 | Breaking the Rules: Chocolate | Himself/host | "Superstar Sabotage" |
| 2015 | Cutthroat Kitchen | Himself | Competitor |
| 2015–2016 | Guilty Pleasures | Himself | |
| 2016–2017 | ChefShock | Himself/co-host | 11 episodes Writer, producer, director |
| 2017 | Cook vs. Cons | Himself | Recurring judge |
| 2020–present | Tournament of Champions | Himself/Reporter | |
| 2023 | Superchef Grudge Match | Himself | vs Simon Majumdar |

== Bibliography ==
- The Laws of Cooking: And How to Break Them (ISBN 1-25006-513-5, 2015)
