= Melissa d'Arabian =

American chef

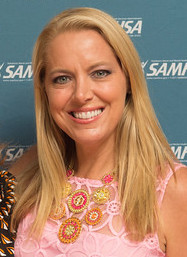
- d'Arabian in 2015
- Born: Melissa Donovan; Tucson, Arizona, U.S.
- Spouse: Philippe d'Arabian
- Culinary career
- Cooking style: American; French; Low calorie
- Television show(s): Ten Dollar Dinners Kitchen Survival Guide (pilot)

Melissa Donovan d'Arabian is an American cookbook author and television show host. She won the fifth season of Food Network Star in 2009. Following her victory, she went on to host Ten Dollar Dinners on Food Network.

== Early life and education ==
Born in Anaheim, California, d'Arabian moved throughout her childhood to Tucson, Arizona; San Diego, California; and Bethesda, Maryland. During this time, d'Arabian attended several private Christian schools. d'Arabian's parents divorced when she was a few months old, and she and her sister were raised solely by her mother. Because her single mother was paying her way through medical school, Melissa discovered her passion for cooking and developed her budget strategies very young. In an interview with Food Network, she said, "That's where I learned about cooking as a way of showing people that you care about them." After high school at St. Andrew's Episcopal School in Maryland, d'Arabian attended the University of Vermont, graduating with a bachelor's degree in Political Science. d'Arabian joined Alpha Chi Omega. After a period working on cruise ships as part of the entertainment staff, d'Arabian studied at Georgetown University, earning her MBA.

== Television and professional career ==
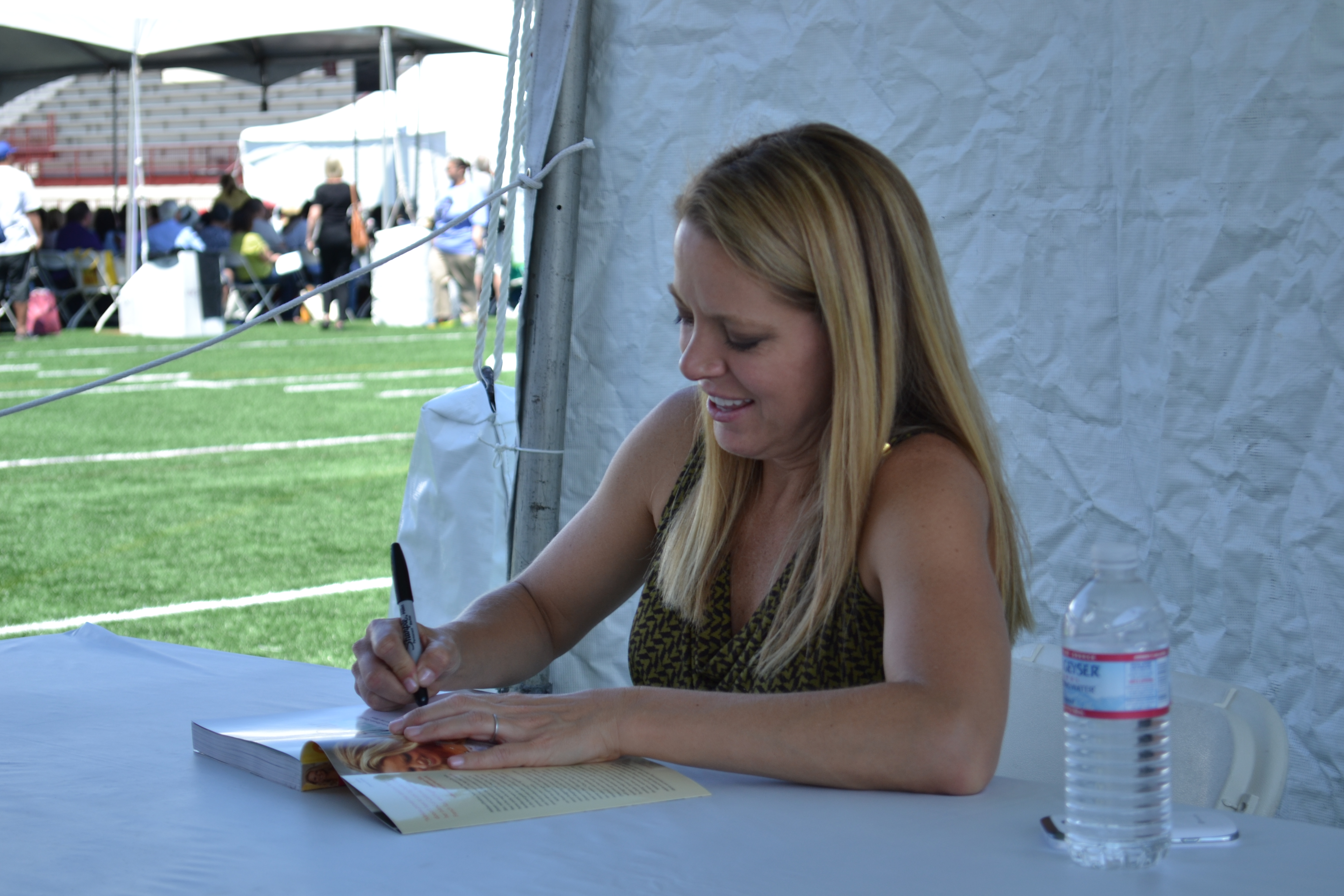
d'Arabian at 2013 LA Times Festival of Books

After winning Food Network Star, d'Arabian launched her show, Ten Dollar Dinners in 2010. The show focused on affordable meals that cost ten dollars or less to make. The show ran for three seasons. In 2012, she published her first cookbook, Ten Dollar Dinners: 140 Recipes and Tips to Elevate Simple, Fresh Meals Any Night of the Week, which became a New York Times best seller. Also in 2012, d'Arabian began hosting a show on the Cooking Channel, Drop 5 Lbs. with Good Housekeeping, which featured low-calorie recipes and weight loss tips.

d'Arabian is a frequent judge on Guy's Grocery Games, where she has demonstrated her ability to speak fluent French. She has also appeared on several other Food Network series, such as The Best Thing I Ever Ate, Chopped, Food Network Challenge, and The Best Thing I Ever Made. Her recipes and budgeting tips have also been featured on the Today Show, CNN, People, Food Network Magazine and iVillage.com.

=== Ten Dollar Dinners ===
Ten Dollar Dinners is an American cooking television program hosted by d'Arabian. It debuted August 9, 2009 at 12:30 PM EST. Melissa d'Arabian is the winner of the fifth season of The Next Food Network Star.

The second season of her program premiered in January 2010 on the Food Network. During this season, she received a new kitchen set, which has the set up similar to a home kitchen. The third season of her program premiered in July 2010.

In each episode, d'Arabian shows the viewers how to cook up a dinner for four people based on a budget of $10 USD.

== Personal life ==
While working in merchandise finance in Euro Disney, d'Arabian met her husband, Philippe. They live near San Diego, California, with their four daughters. d'Arabian identifies as a Christian and attends the First United Methodist Church of San Diego.

=== Mother's suicide and related charitable work ===
On April 12, 1989, d'Arabian lost her mother to suicide. d'Arabian described the loss of her mother as taking a toll on her financially, logistically, and emotionally. Following the death of her mother, d'Arabian states that she entered into a "decade-long tail spin". She attributes this period of time to the isolation she felt due to the stigma of suicide. This experience led d'Arabian to become involved in mental health awareness and suicide prevention. Specifically, d'Arabian advocates for reductions of stigma against suicide, mental health, and substance abuse as well as encouraging people to reach out when they feel suicidal.

Since 2009, d'Arabian has worked with the American Foundation for Suicide Prevention (AFSP). Initially, the AFSP approached her after she dedicated a recipe to her mother on an episode of The Next Food Network Star. They published one of her recipes at a National Survivors of Suicide Day event. d'Arabian has participated in the San Diego Out of the Darkness Community Walk, been a part of the AFSP panel at the Congressional Spouses for Suicide Prevention and Education congressional briefing, and donated cookbook proceeds to the organization. In May 2013, d'Arabian was awarded the Survivor of Suicide Loss Award by the AFSP. She has also competed on Guy's Grocery Games, Chopped, and Cutthroat Kitchen for the American Foundation for Suicide Prevention.

d'Arabian has volunteered with a number of other charitable organization including teaching family cooking courses for Coronado Substance Abuse Free Environment and live-tweeting her mammogram for National Breast Cancer Awareness Month.

== Filmography ==
=== Television ===
Year	Title	Notes
2009	Food Network Star	Season five winner
2009–2011	The Best Thing I Ever Ate	Appeared on 8 episodes
2009–2013	Ten Dollar Dinners	Host
2010	Best Places I've Ever Been	Disney Memories episode
2010	Food Network Challenge: All-Star Grill-Off	
2011–2013	The Best Thing I Ever Made	Appeared on 2 episodes
2012	Chopped All Stars	
2012–present	Drop 5 Lbs with Good Housekeeping	Host
2013–2014	The Picky Eaters Project	Web series
2013–present	Guy's Grocery Games	Judge and contestant
2014	Cutthroat Kitchen: Superstar Sabotage Tournament	
2015–present	Smart Carts: Winning the Supermarket	Web series

== Bibliography ==
Year	Title	Publisher	ISBN
2012	Ten Dollar Dinners: 140 Recipes and Tips to Elevate Simple, Fresh Meals Any Night of the Week	Clarkson Potter Publishers	978-0-307-98517-0
2014	Supermarket Healthy: Recipes and Know-How for Eating Well Without Spending a Lot	Clarkson Potter Publishers	978-0307985149
