= Alton Brown =

American food show presenter, chef, author, YouTuber, and cinematographer (born 1962)

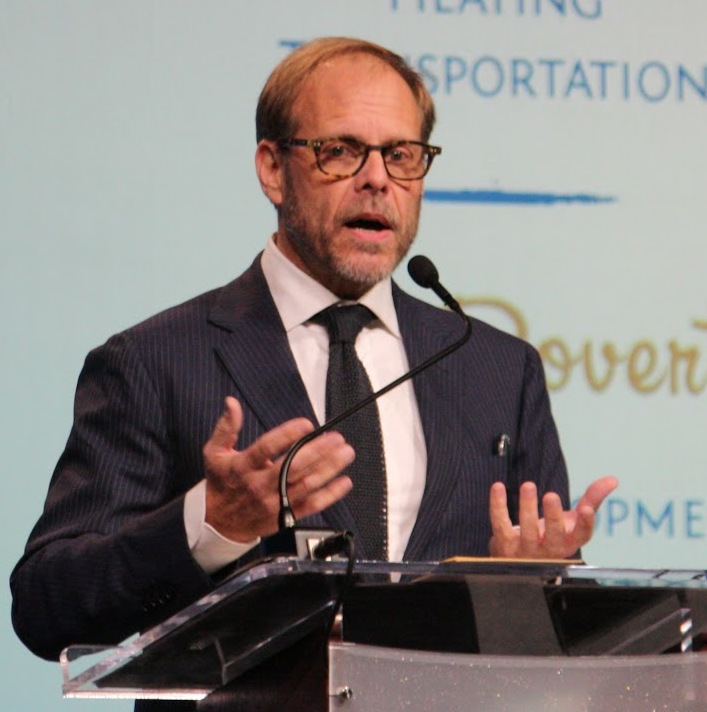
- Brown in 2015
- Born: Alton Crawford Brown Jr. July 30, 1962 (age 64); Los Angeles, California, U.S.
- Education: University of Georgia (BA); New England Culinary Institute
- Spouses: DeAnna Brown (m. 1994; div. 2015) Elizabeth Ingram (m. 2018)
- Children: 1
- Culinary career
- Cooking style: American; Southern
- Television shows: Good Eats; Iron Chef America; Feasting on Waves; Feasting on Asphalt; The Next Food Network Star; Cutthroat Kitchen; Iron Chef Gauntlet; Worst Cooks in America; Iron Chef: Quest for an Iron Legend

Alton Crawford Brown Jr. (born July 30, 1962) is an American television personality, food show presenter, author, voice actor, YouTuber, and cinematographer. He is the creator and host of the Food Network television show Good Eats that ran for 16 seasons, host of the miniseries Feasting on Asphalt and Feasting on Waves, and host and main commentator on Iron Chef America and Cutthroat Kitchen. Brown is a best-selling author of several books on food and cooking. A recap series titled Good Eats Reloaded aired on Cooking Channel, and a true sequel series, Good Eats: The Return, ran from 2019 to 2021 on Food Network.

== Early life ==
Alton Brown was born July 30, 1962, in Los Angeles, California. His father, Alton Crawford Brown, was a media executive in Cleveland, Georgia; owner of radio station WRWH; and publisher of the newspaper White County News. He died on Alton's last day of sixth grade from an apparent suicide.

== Career ==
Brown studied film at the University of Georgia in the early 1980s. He left the university in 1985 only one credit hour short of completing his bachelor's degree. He eventually received it in 2004 after learning that the university's Department of Theatre and Film had since reduced the number of required credits.

Brown got his start in television in the 1980s as a cinematographer for music videos, working on videos such as R.E.M.'s "The One I Love". In the 1990s, he became dissatisfied with the quality of cooking shows airing on American television, so he set out to produce his own show. In preparation, Brown enrolled in the New England Culinary Institute, graduating in 1997. He says that he was a poor science student in high school and college, but Brown focused on the subject to understand the underlying processes of cooking. He is outspoken in his shows about his dislike of single-purpose kitchen utensils and equipment such as garlic presses and margarita machines, although Brown adapts a few traditionally single-purpose devices, such as rice cookers and melon ballers, into multipurpose tools.

=== TV series ===
==== Good Eats ====
The pilot for Good Eats first aired in July 1998 on the PBS member TV station WTTW in Chicago. Food Network picked up the show in July 1999. Many of the Good Eats episodes feature Brown building makeshift cooking devices in order to point out that many of the devices sold at conventional "cooking" stores are simply fancified hardware store items. Good Eats was nominated for the Best TV Food Journalism Award by the James Beard Foundation in 2000. The show was also awarded a 2006 Peabody Award. In May 2011, Alton Brown announced an end to Good Eats after 14 seasons. The final episode, "Turn on the Dark", aired February 10, 2012.

On Alton's 2017 book tour, he stated that Good Eats would have a sequel and that it would be released to the internet in 2018. This was changed in late 2018 when Brown made arrangements with The Cooking Channel to air "revised" versions of several episodes with new recipes titled Good Eats Reloaded, in which he stated new episodes of Good Eats are also in the works. Thirteen episodes of Good Eats Reloaded aired in late winter and early spring 2019, and were added to the Good Eats reruns on The Cooking Channel. It was announced on June 5, 2019, that the new show would be called Good Eats Returns; it premiered on the Food Network with the slightly revised title Good Eats: The Return on Sunday, August 25.

==== Good Eats Reloaded and Good Eats: The Return ====
Brown relaunched the show in two versions: as Good Eats Reloaded on Cooking Channel (which updates, reworks and adds to original Good Eats episodes), and on Food Network as Good Eats: The Return in August 2019 (all-new episodes). New episodes of Reloaded premiered in April 2020. New Return episodes were in the writing process and planned to be filming over the summer of 2020, but were delayed due to the COVID-19 pandemic. These episodes eventually saw release, initially as an exclusive on the new Discovery+ streaming service. In June 2021, the episodes premiered on Food Network as a companion to the Chopped: Alton's Maniacal Baskets tournament. On July 13, 2021, Brown announced that Good Eats: The Return would not be returning for a third season. A third planned season of Good Eats Reloaded was also cancelled, but the recipes planned for the series were included as part of Brown's "Good Eats 4: The Final Years" cookbook.

==== Iron Chef America ====
In 2004, Brown appeared on Iron Chef America: Battle of the Masters. This was the second attempt to adapt the Japanese cooking show Iron Chef to American television (the first being UPN's Iron Chef USA, which featured William Shatner). Brown served as the expert commentator, a modified version of the role played by Dr. Yukio Hattori in the original show. When the show became a series, Brown began serving as the play-by-play announcer, with Kevin Brauch as kitchen reporter. Brown also served as the host for all five seasons of the spin-off The Next Iron Chef.

==== Feasting on Asphalt ====
Brown's third series, Feasting on Asphalt, explores the history of eating on the move. Brown and his crew traveled around the United States via motorcycle in a four-part miniseries about the history of road food. Brown samples food all along his travel route. He includes a "history of food" segment documenting famous road trips and interviews many of the foodies he meets en route.

The series premiered on Food Network on July 29, 2006. The miniseries was picked up for a second run, Feasting on Asphalt 2: The River Run, in 2007. Six episodes were filmed between April and May 2007. The episodes trace the majority of the length of the Mississippi River through Brown's travels. The second run of episodes began airing on Food Network on August 4, 2007. The third season uses the title Feasting on Waves and has Brown traveling the Caribbean by boat in search of local cuisine.

==== Cutthroat Kitchen ====
In 2013, Brown began hosting the cooking competition series Cutthroat Kitchen on the Food Network. In each episode, four chefs are each given $25,000 with which to bid on items that can be used to hinder their opponents' cooking, such as confiscating ingredients or forcing them to use unorthodox tools and equipment. Three chefs are eliminated one by one, and the winner keeps their unspent money as the day's prize. The series premiered on August 11, 2013.

==== Worst Cooks in America ====
In 2018, Brown hosted Season 18 of Worst Cooks in America as the blue team mentor. The season debuted on January 5, 2020.

==== Iron Chef: Quest for an Iron Legend ====
In 2022, Netflix rebooted Iron Chef America as Iron Chef: Quest for an Iron Legend, signing Brown as co-host with Kristen Kish.

=== Tours ===
==== The Edible Inevitable Tour ====
In October 2013, Brown launched Alton Brown Live: The Edible Inevitable Tour, his first national tour visiting 46 cities through March 2014. The show included stand-up comedy, talk show antics, a multimedia lecture, live music, and "extreme" food experimentation. After a hiatus of several months while Brown worked on his Food Network shows, the tour resumed in October 2014 and concluded on April 4, 2015, in Houston, Texas, after visiting more than 60 cities.

==== Eat Your Science ====
Brown mounted a second tour show, Alton Brown Live: Eat Your Science, in 2016. The show toured through the fall of 2017. All totaled, Brown's shows have played over 225 dates including Broadway. Both his tours have included "large, unusual and probably dangerous" food demonstrations, audience participation, and even food songs performed by Brown and his combo. Brown has been quoted as saying his final tour will launch in the fall of 2020.

==== Beyond the Eats ====
Brown's third tour titled Alton Brown Live: Beyond the Eats was announced on his Twitter page in March 2021. The tour began in October 2021 and had several "legs" or overall tour runs, the last of which (done with added "holiday" materials) ran from November to December 2024.

=== Awards ===
Brown is the recipient of two James Beard Awards. He won the Best Book award in 2003 for his first book, I'm Just Here for the Food, and the Broadcast Media Award in 2011 for TV Food Personality/Host. He has also been nominated four additional times.

=== Other appearances ===
Brown served as a mentor on Season 8 of The Next Food Network Star alongside Bobby Flay and Giada De Laurentiis. During Season 8, each mentor selected and mentored a team of five finalists. Alton's finalist, Justin Warner, was the Season 8 winner; however, Brown will not be producing Warner's show.

Brown guest-starred in an episode of SpongeBob SquarePants titled "House Fancy" where he provides the voice of Nicholas Withers, the host of the titular show.

Brown appeared on the Travel Channel show The Layover with Anthony Bourdain which focused on the city of Atlanta in 2013. In the episode Bourdain takes Brown to the Clermont Lounge.

Brown guest starred as the "Guest Bailiff" and "Expert Witness" in John Hodgman's comedy/court show podcast Judge John Hodgman.

In October 2017, Brown was featured on the Food Network television show Chopped in a five-part series called "Alton Brown's Challenge".

Brown voiced Yum Labouché in Big Hero 6: The Series. The character is a judge for an underground cooking competition.

Brown appeared on episode 196 of MythBusters titled "Food Fables".

In June 2022, he appeared on the web series Good Mythical Morning episode "Match the Flavor to the Doritos". He was originally scheduled to appear in a summer 2020 episode, as he revealed in a livestream in March 2020, however did not happen due to the COVID-19 pandemic.

=== Commercials ===
Brown has done commercial work for General Electric products, including five infomercials touting the benefits of GE refrigerators, washers and dryers, water purifiers, Trivection ovens, and dishwashers. The infomercials are produced in the Good Eats style, employing the use of unusual camera angles, informational text, props, visual aids, scientific explanations, and the same method of delivery. These infomercials are distributed to wholesale distributors of appliances/plumbing devices.

Brown has also aided GE in developing a new type of oven. He was initially called by GE to help their engineers learn more about the effects of heat on food; that grew into an active cooperation to develop GE's Trivection oven.

Brown has promoted Colgate toothpaste, Dannon yogurt, Welch's, Shun knives, and Heifer International. In 2010, he endorsed kosher salt use in a campaign for Cargill. In 2020, he began doing commercials for Healthy Choice's line of low-fat, low-calorie, vegetable-based "Power Dressings",

In 2022, Brown began appearing in commercials and marketing campaigns for the supplement Neuriva.

=== Twitter ===
In 2012, Brown gained popularity by pioneering the use of humorous "Analog Tweets", wherein he posts pictures of hand-written or drawn Twitter responses on Post-it Notes which he has stuck to his computer monitor.

=== The Alton Browncast ===
On June 28, 2013, Alton Brown joined the Nerdist Podcast Network with his podcast The Alton Browncast, covering food news, men's style, music and other topics. 68 episodes were produced from 2013 to 2017.

=== Pantry Raid and Quarantine Quitchen ===
With the COVID-19 quarantine in 2020 and the subsequent delays in production on Season 16 of Good Eats (Season 2 of "The Return"), Alton took to YouTube to make two new online cooking series.

Pantry Raid was a series of once-weekly shorts (usually released on Fridays or Saturdays) for making palatable foods while staying safe at home. The episodes were filmed in the Good Eats test kitchens at Brain Food Productions and consisted of Alton and a cameraman as the only personnel onsite.

Quarantine Quitchen [aka "QQ"] started as a single livestream titled "The Browns Make Dinner", referring to Alton and his wife Elizabeth making dinner at their loft apartment in Georgia. After the success of the first such "episode", the once-weekly series was released live every Tuesday. The series continued off and on while the Browns went on tour in 2022, and only appeared sporadically in 2023. The last episode was live-streamed on July 25, 2023.

=== Alton Brown Cooks Food ===
In November, 2025, Alton started a new series on his YouTube channel called Alton Brown Cooks Food. Weekly episodes contain a mix of new recipes, cooking tips (e.g., on knife skills), updates of old recipes and techniques, and have featured popular YouTube guests such as Andrew Rea (of Binging with Babish) and Guga Foods. The episodes sometimes contain moderately racy jokes, which is a departure from Alton's made-for-television productions. The episodes are shot at his private test kitchen, sound stage, and studio in Marietta, Georgia.

== Personal life ==
Brown lives in Marietta, Georgia. He has been married twice. He and his first wife DeAnna, an executive producer on Good Eats, divorced in 2015. They have one daughter, who was born in 1999. A few members of his extended family appeared on Good Eats, such as his mother, late grandmother, and daughter, who is known on the show as "Alton's Spawn", but most of his "family members" portrayed on the series were actors or members of the show's production crew.

Brown and Atlanta restaurant designer Elizabeth Ingram became engaged in 2018. Brown posted in September 2018 that he and Ingram had married on a boat in Charleston, South Carolina.

Brown was once a motorcycling enthusiast, although he no longer owns one. Brown is also an airplane pilot and was featured in the aviation magazine AOPA Flight Training. He owned two planes, a Cessna 206 and a Cessna 414.

Brown also collects vintage watches and wears a different one for every season of Good Eats; this was used in production to quickly identify which season a clip is from. When his watch broke midseason, Brown continued to wear it for the rest of the season to maintain this system. Twenty years after the Omega Seamaster watch his father left him was stolen, Brown found it on eBay, bought it back, and had it restored.

Brown changed his eating habits in 2009 in order to lose weight and become healthier, losing 50 pounds (23 kg) over the course of nine months.

Brown discussed his Christian beliefs in a 2010 interview with Eater. He said at the time:

I'm not a spooky snake handler because I live in Georgia and I'm Christian [...] that I believe in the Bible, that I travel with the Bible, that I read the Bible every day. I'm still me. I'm still a guy doing a job. I find, actually, that people ask me a lot about it. I don't hit people over the head with the Bible [...] I still feel a funny little tinge in my stomach when I'm out to dinner with my wife and daughter in New York. We'll go to dinner and we'll be sitting around the table and we'll say grace. You know what? People are going to stare at you. I used to feel really self-conscious. But I've gotten to a point where I think, nah, I'm not going to feel bad about that. I'm not going to apologize about that.

Brown said in a December 2014 interview in Time that he "could no longer abide the Southern Baptist Convention's indoctrination of children and its anti-gay stance" adding that he is now "searching for a new belief system."

In November 2020, Brown declared on Twitter that he has almost always voted Republican, but that the 2016 United States Presidential Election was the first time he considered voting for a Democrat since Michael Dukakis in 1988. Brown supported Joe Biden in the 2020 U.S. Presidential Election, as well as Democrats running in U.S. Senate races in Georgia.

== Works ==
- I'm Just Here for the Food: Food + Heat = Cooking (ISBN 1-58479-083-0, 2002)
- Alton Brown's Gear for Your Kitchen (ISBN 1-58479-296-5, 2003)
- I'm Just Here for the Food: Kitchen User's Manual (ISBN 1-58479-298-1, 2003)
- I'm Just Here for the Food: Cook's Notes (ISBN 1-58479-299-X, 2003)
- I'm Just Here for More Food: Food × Mixing + Heat = Baking (ISBN 1-58479-341-4, 2004)
- I'm Just Here for the Food: Food + Heat = Cooking Version 2.0 (ISBN 1-58479-559-X, 2006)
- Feasting on Asphalt: The River Run (ISBN 1-58479-681-2, 2008)
- Good Eats: The Early Years (ISBN 1-58479-795-9, 2009)
- Good Eats 2: The Middle Years (ISBN 1-58479-857-2, 2010)
- Good Eats 3: The Later Years (ISBN 1-58479-903-X, 2011)
- Good Eats: Two-Volume Set - Episodes 1 Through 164 (ISBN 978-0-81-099822-3, 2011)
- Good Eats: Three-Volume Set - The Complete Episodes (ISBN 978-1-61-769105-8, 2013)
- EveryDayCook (ISBN 978-1-101-88571-0, 2016)
- Good Eats 4: The Final Years (ISBN 978-1-41-975352-7, 2022)
- Food for Thought: Essays & Ruminations (ISBN 978-1668064214, 2025)

== See also ==
- Shirley Corriher
