= List of Cutthroat Kitchen episodes =

Cutthroat Kitchen is a reality cooking television show hosted by Alton Brown. It premiered on August 11, 2013, on Food Network, and features four chefs competing in a three-round elimination cooking competition. The contestants face auctions in which they can purchase opportunities to sabotage one another. Each chef is given $25,000 at the start of the show; the person left standing keeps whatever money they have not spent in the auctions. The show is in its fifteenth season as of June 2017.

== Series overview ==
Season	Episodes	Originally released	
Season	Episodes	First released	Last released
1	13	August 11, 2013	November 3, 2013
2	13	December 15, 2013	March 9, 2014
3	13	March 16, 2014	June 8, 2014
4	13	June 22, 2014	September 14, 2014
5	13	September 21, 2014	November 9, 2014
6	13	November 16, 2014	February 8, 2015
7	14	February 15, 2015	May 17, 2015
8	12	May 24, 2015	August 9, 2015
9	13	August 12, 2015	October 4, 2015
10	13	October 11, 2015	December 2, 2015
11	13	December 6, 2015	February 21, 2016
12	13	February 28, 2016	May 22, 2016
13	12	June 1, 2016	August 17, 2016
14	13	August 24, 2016	February 8, 2017
15	8	June 7, 2017	July 19, 2017
16	9	January 21, 2017	April 25, 2017

== Episodes ==
=== Season 1 ===
No. overall	No. in season	Title	Dishes	Judge	Amount Won	Original release date	Prod. code
1	1	"Vive le Sabotage"	Turkey dinner; French toast; Lobster roll and a side	Antonia Lofaso	$11,900	August 11, 2013	KT0104H
2	2	"Porkchops and Sabotage"	Pork chops with applesauce; Macaroni and cheese; Fish and chips	Simon Majumdar	$18,000	August 18, 2013	KT0103H
3	3	"Tac'o the Town"	Tacos; Eggs Benedict; Crab cakes	Simon Majumdar	$2,000	August 25, 2013	KT0102H
4	4	"Let Them Eat Cupcakes"	Philly cheesesteak; Cupcakes; Pizza	Simon Majumdar	$8,700	September 1, 2013	KT0105H
5	5	"Winner, Winner, Fried Chicken Dinner"	Ravioli; Hamburger and a side; Fried chicken dinner	Antonia Lofaso	$4,800	September 8, 2013	KT0106H
6	6	"Wing It"	Spaghetti and meatballs; Chicken wings; Doughnuts	Jet Tila	$20,200	September 15, 2013	KT0101H
7	7	"Tiny Tools, Big Problems"	Grilled cheese sandwich with tomato soup; Shepherd's pie; Egg roll	Jet Tila	$11,800	September 22, 2013	KT0107H
8	8	"Steak Out"	Steak and fries; Omelette; Bananas Foster	Simon Majumdar	$7,700	September 29, 2013	KT0108H
9	9	"Kiss My Grits"	Nachos; Sausage and peppers; Shrimp and grits	Jet Tila	$14,900	October 6, 2013	KT0109H
10	10	"Humble Pie"	Burrito; Pie; Teriyaki rice bowl (Donburi)	Jet Tila	$9,000	October 13, 2013	KT0110H
11	11	"Un-Holy Trinity"	Pancake breakfast; Jambalaya; Meatloaf and mashed potatoes	Antonia Lofaso	$9,800	October 20, 2013	KT0111H
12	12	"Chicken Cordon 'Blue'"	Lasagna; Chili; Chicken Cordon Bleu	Antonia Lofaso	$7,500	October 27, 2013	KT0112H
13	13	"S'more Sabotage"	Sandwich and a side; Barbecue dinner; S'mores	Jet Tila	$19,200	November 3, 2013	KT0113H

=== Season 2 ===
No. overall	No. in season	Title	Dishes	Judge	Amount Won	Original release date	Prod. code
14	1	"Wham, Clam, Thank You, Ma'am"	Patty melt; Clams casino; Ice cream sundae	Simon Majumdar	$4,600	December 15, 2013	KT0201H
15	2	"Duck, Duck, Gnocchi"	Gnocchi; Duck à l'orange; Ice cream sandwich	Antonia Lofaso	$17,000	December 22, 2013	KT0203H
16	3	"Shrimp or Get Off the Pot Sticker"	Pot stickers; Peanut butter and jelly dish; Shrimp scampi	Antonia Lofaso	$13,600	December 29, 2013	KT0204H
17	4	"The Yolk's on You"	Deviled eggs; Chicken and waffles; Fruit crumble	Giada De Laurentiis	$4,600	January 5, 2014	KT0205H
18	5	"Cutthroat Kiddy Kitchen"	Chicken parmesan; Summer roll; Strawberry shortcake	Simon Majumdar	$15,500	January 12, 2014	KT0202H
19	6	"Soupsy Daisy"	Quesadilla; Chicken noodle soup; Fish fry	Simon Majumdar	$7,700	January 19, 2014	KT0206H
20	7	"A Penny for Your Chocolates"	French fries; Kebab plate; Chocolate chip cookies	Antonia Lofaso	$18,100	January 26, 2014	KT0207H
21	8	"A Crepe-y Situation"	Sushi rolls; Huevos rancheros; Crepes	Jet Tila	$9,900	February 2, 2014	KT0208H
22	9	"Melts in Your Pot, Not in Your Hand"	Potato skins; Pad Thai; Birthday cake	Jet Tila	$14,400	February 9, 2014	KT0209H
23	10	"Foul Play"	Lettuce wrap; New England clam chowder; Chicken fried steak	Simon Majumdar	$5,600	February 16, 2014	KT0210H
24	11	"Gluttons for Punishment (Note: "Gluttons for Punishment" was a special redemption episode where losers from previous episodes returned. The returning contestants were Patrick Stark (Season 1: Vive le Sabotage), Crystal "Pink" Harris (Season 1: Pork Chops and Sabotage), Farid Zadi (Season 1: Let Them Eat Cupcakes), and Jack Lee (Season 1: Chicken Cordon 'Blue'))"	Hot dog; Pasta Carbonara; Brownies	Jet Tila	$7,400	February 23, 2014	KT0211H
25	12	"It's Not Delivery, It's Old Delivery"	American breakfast; Calzone; Fajitas	Jet Tila	$1,400	March 2, 2014	KT0212H
26	13	"Pressed or Steamed"	Jalapeño poppers; Quiche; Steamed mussels	Antonia Lofaso	$4,100	March 9, 2014	KT0213H

=== Season 3 ===
No. overall	No. in season	Title	Dishes	Judge	Amount Won	Original release date	Prod. code
27	1	"A Few Good Ramen"	BLT; Ramen; Souffle	Simon Majumdar	$2,200	March 16, 2014	KT0307H
28	2	"Breakfast in Bed (Note: "Breakfast in Bed" was a special episode alternatively titled "Wickedest Winners" that brought back previous winners for a second time. The contestants were Frankie Terzoli (Season 1: Vive le Sabotage), Jamie Gwen (Season 1: Pork Chops and Sabotage), Tanya Charles (Season 1: Let Them Eat Cupcakes), and Brian Cartenuto (Season 1: Winner, Winner, Fried Chicken Dinner))"	Cocktail and hors d'oeuvre; Breakfast burrito; Bread pudding	Jet Tila	$6,000	March 23, 2014	KT0308H
29	3	"Hawai'i 5-Oh No!"	Pesto pasta; Hawaiian lunch plate; Muffins	Antonia Lofaso	$19,000	March 30, 2014	KT0309H
30	4	"Two Chefs in a Pod"	Pea soup; Lamb chop dinner; Chocolate mousse	Simon Majumdar	$16,600	April 6, 2014	KT0301H
31	5	"Chain of Tools (Note: "Chain of Tools" originally aired under the title "Layer, I Hardly Know Her!")"	Cobb salad; Enchilada; Layer cake	Antonia Lofaso	$8,600	April 13, 2014	KT0302H
32	6	"Tso Good"	Poutine; General Tso's chicken; Carrot cake	Antonia Lofaso	$1,300	April 20, 2014	KT0303H
33	7	"The Rice Stuff"	Risotto; Reuben sandwich; Baked Alaska	Simon Majumdar	$18,500	April 27, 2014	KT0304H
34	8	"Ladel-ayheehoo"	French onion soup; Blackened fish; Banana Split	Simon Majumdar	$7,200	May 4, 2014	KT0305H
35	9	"Life's a Mystery... Meat"	Sloppy joe; Chicken picatta; Funnel cake	Jet Tila	$9,300	May 11, 2014	KT0306H
36	10	"Hakuna Frittata"	Frittata; Po' boy; Steak Diane	Jet Tila	$6,900	May 18, 2014	KT0312H
37	11	"Well, Hot Clam!"	Sliders; Clam bake; Barbecue chicken sandwich	Geoffrey Zakarian	$6,800	May 25, 2014	KT0311H
38	12	"Judging Judges (Note: "Judging Judges" was special episode where the three main Cutthroat Kitchen judges (plus previous guest judge Geoffrey Zakarian) competed)"	Taquitos; Meatball sub; Fruit tart	Jaime Martin del Campo and Ramiro Arvizu (Round 1); Daniel Holzman (Round 2); Sherry Yard (Round 3)	$22,000 (Note: The winner of "Judging Judges" initially won $22,000 for their charity, but as a surprise bonus received the full $25,000. The losing contestants each received a surprise $5,000 for their charity as well)	June 1, 2014	KT0310H
39	13	"Panini, Meeny, Miny, Moe"	Chicken pot pie; Panini; Cheesecake	Jet Tila	$7,900	June 8, 2014	KT0313H

=== Season 4 ===
No. overall	No. in season	Title	Dishes	Judge	Amount Won	Original release date	Prod. code
40	1	"I Can't Believe It's Not Udder"	Breakfast sandwich; Pasta bolognese; Tres leches cake	Jet Tila	$5,000	June 22, 2014	KT0401H
41	2	"You Wanna Pizza This?"	Soup and salad; Pizza; Key lime pie	Antonia Lofaso	$8,000	June 29, 2014	KT0402H
42	3	"Anything but a Cake Walk"	Steak dinner; Biscuits and gravy; Ice cream cake	Simon Majumdar	$11,200	July 6, 2014	KT0404H
43	4	"Big Trouble in Little Chinese Chicken Salad"	Chinese chicken salad; Club sandwich; Doughnuts	Antonia Lofaso	$18,700	July 13, 2014	KT0403H
44	5	"Welcome to the Jungle"	Satay with peanut sauce; Beef Stroganoff; Fondue	Jet Tila	$18,100	July 20, 2014	KT0405H
45	6	"I Like My Peppers Pulverized"	Cuban sandwich; Stuffed peppers; Tiramisu	Antonia Lofaso	$6,500	July 27, 2014	KT0406H
46	7	"Two Chefs, One Toga"	Corn chowder; Gyro; Ginger snap cookies	Simon Majumdar	$18,500	August 3, 2014	KT0409H
47	8	"Ho-Ley Pot"	Minestrone; Falafel; Milkshake	Antonia Lofaso	$16,000	August 10, 2014	KT0407H
48	9	"Superhero Sabotage"	Hero sandwich; TV dinner; Banana split	Jet Tila	$16,500	August 17, 2014	KT0411H
49	10	"The Eggs-Orcist"	Breakfast scramble; Lobster roll; Chocolate cake	Simon Majumdar	$21,500	August 24, 2014	KT0408H
50	11	"When in Rome, Cook On A Scooter"	Bruschetta; Casserole; Red velvet cake	Simon Majumdar	$13,400	August 31, 2014	KT0410H
51	12	"Chili'd to the Bone"	Chili cheese dog; Fettuccine Alfredo; Crêpe Suzette	Simon Majumdar	$6,000	September 7, 2014	KT0412H
52	13	"Tongue Thai-ed"	Thai coconut soup; Chimichanga; Marshmallow Crispy Treats	Antonia Lofaso	$14,800	September 14, 2014	KT0413H

=== Season 5 ===
No. overall	No. in season	Title	Dishes	Judge	Amount Won	Original release date	Prod. code
53	1	"Crabs of Steel"	Bento box; Crab cakes; Pineapple upside-down cake	Jet Tila	$12,700 (Note: In "Crabs of Steel", Jet Tila announced a tie between the two contestants in the final round. Both chefs got to keep the money they had left. This was the first tie in Cutthroat Kitchen history.) $10,000	September 21, 2014	KT0501H
54	2	"Tos-ta-da"	Chicken fingers; Tostada; Corn muffins	Jet Tila	$16,000	September 28, 2014	KT0502H
55	3	"SaBOOOtage (Note: "SaBOOOtage" was a special Halloween episode)"	Deviled eggs; Stew; Devil's food cake	Jet Tila	$16,500	October 5, 2014	KT0504H
56	4	"Superstar Sabotage: Heat One (Note: In each preliminary heat for Superstar Sabotage Tournament, every losing contestant still received $2,500 for their charities)"	Salmon dinner; Kung Pao chicken; French toast	Antonia Lofaso	$10,600	October 8, 2014	KT0507H
57	5	"Here's Looking at You, Squid"	Macaroni and cheese; Fried calamari; Coffee cake	Simon Majumdar	$13,800	October 12, 2014	KT0503H
58	6	"Superstar Sabotage: Heat Two"	Pancake breakfast; Popcorn shrimp; Oatmeal cookies	Jet Tila	$7,300	October 15, 2014	KT0509H
59	7	"Chip off the ol' Baklava"	Wrap; Chips and dip; Baklava	Jet Tila	$14,000	October 19, 2014	KT0508H
60	8	"Superstar Sabotage: Heat Three"	Surf and turf; Croque monsieur; Lemon bar	Simon Majumdar	$24,600	October 22, 2014	KT0510H
61	9	"The Undertater"	Loaded baked potato; Korean barbecue dinner; Turnover	Antonia Lofaso	$6,900	October 26, 2014	KT0512H
62	10	"Superstar Sabotage: Heat Four"	Seven layer dip; Eggplant parmesan; Banana bread	Antonia Lofaso	$10,800	October 29, 2014	KT0511H
63	11	"With a Chariot on Top"	Chicken Caesar salad; Shrimp and grits; Ice cream sandwich	Simon Majumdar	$9,700	November 2, 2014	KT0601H
64	12	"Superstar Sabotage: Finale"	Meatballs; Fish and chips; Candy	Simon Majumdar	$45,000 (Note: In the Superstar Sabotage Finale, each of the chefs started off with $50,000 instead of the usual $25,000)	November 5, 2014	KT0513H
65	13	"Empanada Chance"	Waffle breakfast; Empanada; Lemon meringue pie	Antonia Lofaso	$6,500	November 9, 2014	KT0602H

=== Season 6 ===
No. overall	No. in season	Title	Dishes	Judge	Amount Won	Original release date	Prod. code
66	1	"Thanks, but No Thanksgiving (Note: "Thanks, but No Thanksgiving" was a special Thanksgiving episode)"	Turkey dinner; Butternut squash soup; Pecan pie	Simon Majumdar	$6,600	November 16, 2014	KT0505H
67	2	"In It to Twin It (Note: "In It to Twin It" was a special twins episode that had two sets of twin brothers as the contestants)"	Calzone; Caribbean dinner; Birthday cake	Antonia Lofaso	$10,400	November 23, 2014	KT0603H
68	3	"S'Mortal Combat"	Chili and cornbread; Dim sum; S'mores	Jet Tila	$23,900	November 30, 2014	KT0604H
69	4	"Sabotage is Comin' to Town (Note: "Sabotage is Comin' to Town" was a special Holiday episode)"	Ham dinner; Cocktail and hors d'oeuvre; Holiday cookies	Simon Majumdar	$4,000	December 7, 2014	KT0506H
70	5	"When Pigs Fry"	Pigs in a Blanket; Curry; Blueberry muffins	Jet Tila	$17,900	December 14, 2014	KT0605H
71	6	"I Would Do Anything For Loaf"	Breakfast quesadilla; Meatloaf; Cupcakes	Jet Tila	$6,800	December 21, 2014	KT0607H
72	7	"The Cone Ranger"	American breakfast; Pork chops with applesauce; Ice cream cone	Jet Tila	$25,000	December 28, 2014	KT0610H
73	8	"The Long Tools and Shortcake Of It"	Breakfast hash; Southwestern salad; Strawberry shortcake	Simon Majumdar	$6,900	January 4, 2015	KT0609H
74	9	"Tiki Torch-ure"	Fish tacos; Pasta salad; Apple pie	Antonia Lofaso	$2,400	January 11, 2015	KT0611H
75	10	"Baby Got Backpack"	Grilled cheese sandwich with tomato soup; Orange chicken; Granola bars	Simon Majumdar	$9,200	January 18, 2015	KT0612H
76	11	"The Supper Bowl (Note: "The Supper Bowl" was a special Super Bowl episode, but the show couldn't actually use "Super Bowl" and instead referred to "The Big Game.")"	Sliders; Chicken wings; Brownies	Antonia Lofaso	$15,500	January 25, 2015	KT0608H
77	12	"Who Tarted?"	Steamed clams; Turkey burger; Fruit tart	Valerie Bertinelli	$10,500	February 1, 2015	KT0702H
78	13	"Alton and the Chocolate Factory (Note: "Alton and the Chocolate Factory" was a special Valentine's Day/Chocolate episode with four pastry chefs as the contestants)"	Molten chocolate cake; savory chocolate dish; Box of chocolates	Simon Majumdar	$8,200	February 8, 2015	KT0606H

=== Season 7 ===
No. overall	No. in season	Title	Dishes	Judge	Amount Won	Original release date	Prod. code
79	1	"Whatchoo Taco'ing About, Alton?"	Deli sandwich; Tacos; Ice cream sundae	Anne Burrell	$17,800	February 15, 2015	KT0701H
80	2	"Gno-cchi to Victory"	Gnocchi; Drunken noodles; Thumbprint cookies	Jet Tila	$9,900	February 22, 2015	KT0613H
81	3	"You're Bacon Me Crazy"	Bacon wrapped entrée; Lasagna; Black and white cookies	Antonia Lofaso	$8,900	March 1, 2015	KT0703H
82	4	"Whisk-ey Business"	Omelette; Oysters Rockefeller; Cream puffs	Antonia Lofaso	$12,600	March 8, 2015	KT0704H
83	5	"Scone Home"	Tuna melt; Salisbury steak; Scones	Jet Tila	$6,200	March 15, 2015	KT0705H
84	6	"Great Egg-Scape"	Eggs Benedict; British pub dish; Sandwich cookies	Simon Majumdar	$5,400	March 22, 2015	KT0706H
85	7	"You're all up Banh Mi"	Banh mi sandwich; Mexican tortilla soup; Galette	Antonia Lofaso	$12,900	March 29, 2015	KT0707H
86	8	"Lamb-a Dama Ding Dong (Note: "Lamb-a Dama Ding Dong was a special Spring episode)"	Egg salad sandwich; Lamb dinner; Carrot cake	Simon Majumdar	$18,400	April 5, 2015	KT0713H
87	9	"Live and Let Diner"	Skillet breakfast; French dip sandwich; Rum cake	Jet Tila	$2,800	April 12, 2015	KT0801H
88	10	"Evilicious: Canoe Jack City"	Fish stew; Pasta Carbonara; Pound cake	Antonia Lofaso	$4,300	April 19, 2015	KT0709H
89	11	"Evilicious: Frying First Class"	Stir fry; Chicken fried steak; Cobbler	Jet Tila	$8,300	April 26, 2015	KT0708H
90	12	"Evilicious: 20,000 Leagues Under the Prep Table"	Fast food meal; Scallop dish; Doughnuts	Jet Tila	$14,500	May 3, 2015	KT0710H
91	13	"Evilicious: Moo-in' On Up"	Sushi rolls; Veal Milanese; Pumpkin pie	Simon Majumdar	$6,300	May 10, 2015	KT0711H
92	14	"Evilicious: Finale"	Spaghetti and meatballs; Teriyaki dinner; Coconut macaroons	Simon Majumdar	$5,800 (Note: In the "Evilicious" Tournament Finale, the chefs were given $50,000 to start instead of the usual $25,000)	May 17, 2015	KT0712H

=== Season 8 ===
No. overall	No. in season	Title	Dishes	Judge	Amount Won	Original release date	Prod. code
93	1	"21 Chum Street"	Poke; Croque-madame; Banana nut muffins	Simon Majumdar	$2,400	May 24, 2015	KT0802H
94	2	"Grill or be Grilled (Note: "Grill or be Grilled" was a special grilling episode)"	Barbecue chicken; Skewers; Hamburger	Simon Majumdar	$9,100	May 31, 2015	KT0808H
95	3	"Carne Diem"	French omelette; Carne asada; Baked apples	Jet Tila	$12,000	June 7, 2015	KT0804H
96	4	"The Best of the Worst (Note: "The Best of the Worst" was special episode that brought back past famous sabotages that were deemed the most "evil")"	American breakfast; Chicken parmesan; Crepes	Jet Tila	$19,900	June 14, 2015	KT0807H
97	5	"The Waffle Truth"	Spinach-artichoke dip; Stromboli; Belgian waffles	Simon Majumdar	$13,600	June 21, 2015	KT0806H
98	6	"Tikka Me Alton"	Fruit smoothie; Chicken tikka masala; Oatmeal raisin cookies	Susan Feniger	$12,800	June 28, 2015	KT0805H
99	7	"Circus Spectacular (Note: "Circus Spectacular" was a special circus episode)"	Corn dog; Peanut dish; Funnel cake	Simon Majumdar	$14,200	July 5, 2015	KT0809H
100	8	"Meanwhile, Back on the Huevos Rancheros..."	Huevos rancheros; Pasta primavera; Blondies	Antonia Lofaso	$9,600	July 12, 2015	KT0803H
101	9	"My Kitchen for a Horse"	Southern biscuit breakfast; Chicken nuggets; Shortbread cookie	Jet Tila	$20,500	July 19, 2015	KT0810H
102	10	"I Know Who Kilt Me"	Scotch egg; Beef and broccoli; Key lime pie	Jet Tila	$13,800	July 26, 2015	KT0811H
103	11	"All in a Day's Jerk"	Jerk chicken; Swedish meatballs; Peanut butter and jelly dessert	Cat Cora	$18,500	August 2, 2015	KT0813H
104	12	"Molasses, Mo' Problems"	Vegetable soup; Philly cheesesteak; Molasses cookies	Simon Majumdar	$11,300	August 9, 2015	KT0901H

=== Season 9 ===
No. overall	No. in season	Title	Dishes	Judge	Amount Won	Original release date	Prod. code
105	1	"Camp Cutthroat: Porks and Rec (Note: Preliminary rounds for the Camp Cutthroat Tournament featured only three competitors and two rounds. The finale had the usual four competitors and three rounds)"	Pork and beans; Skewers	Simon Majumdar	$8,300	August 12, 2015	KTSP02H
106	2	"Stop, Drop and Flambe (Note: "Stop, Drop and Flambe" was special firefighter episode that featured four firefighters as the contestants)"	Chili cheese fries; Buffalo chicken sandwich; Flambé dish	Antonia Lofaso	$12,700	August 16, 2015	KT0902H
107	3	"Camp Cutthroat: Wet, Hot, American Sabotage"	Pancake breakfast; Steak dinner	Simon Majumdar	$10,300	August 19, 2015	KTSP01H
108	4	"The Truck Stops Here (Note: "The Truck Stops Here" was a special food truck episode where the four contestants were food truck owners/chefs)"	Breakfast sandwich; Burrito; Dipped ice cream	Jet Tila	$11,500	August 23, 2015	KT0812H
109	5	"Camp Cutthroat: Rock Wall Me, Amadeus"	Barbecue chicken; Sack lunch	Jet Tila	$8,700	August 26, 2015	KTSP03H
110	6	"Greece Lightning"	Spanakopita; Seafood risotto; Monkey bread	Simon Majumdar	$19,100	August 30, 2015	KT0903H
111	7	"Camp Cutthroat: If It Bleeds, We Can Skillet"	Skillet breakfast; Chili and cornbread	Jet Tila	$11,600	September 2, 2015	KTSP04H
112	8	"Grandma-tage (Note: "Grandma-tage" was a special grandmothers episode where the four contestants were grandmothers)"	Stuffed French toast; Casserole; Pie	Jet Tila	$12,800	September 6, 2015	KT0904H
113	9	"Camp Cutthroat Finale: The Great Troutdoors"	Trout dinner; Macaroni and cheese; Camp dessert	Antonia Lofaso	$18,500 (Note: In the Camp Cutthroat Finale, each of the chefs were given $50,000 to start instead of the usual $25,000)	September 9, 2015	KTSP05H
114	10	"Taco Dirty to Me"	Breakfast tacos; Italian wedding soup; New York cheesecake	David Alan Grier	$7,100	September 13, 2015	KT0905H
115	11	"Operation Gumbo Drop"	German apple pancakes; Gumbo; White chocolate macadamia nut cookies	Simon Majumdar	$5,800	September 20, 2015	KT0906H
116	12	"We Came, We See-Sawed, We Conquered"	Toad in a hole; Sesame chicken; Napoleon	Simon Majumdar	$9,800	September 27, 2015	KT0907H
117	13	"Sabootage 2: Electric Boo-Galoo (Note: "Sabootage 2: Electric Boo-Galoo" was a special Halloween episode)"	Wrap; Goulash; Candy	Simon Majumdar	$8,600	October 4, 2015	KT0908H

=== Season 10 ===
No. overall	No. in season	Title	Dishes	Judge	Amount Won	Original release date	Prod. code
118	1	"The Full Monte Cristo"	Monte Cristo sandwich; Ratatouille; Rocky road ice cream	Jet Tila	$13,500	October 11, 2015	KT0909H
119	2	"A River Runs Canoe It"	Fish sandwich; Chili; Mississippi mud pie	Susan Feniger	$9,800	October 18, 2015	KT0910H
120	3	"Actions Speak Chowder Than Words"	Manhattan clam chowder; Stuffed shells; Gingerbread cookies	Jet Tila	$1,900	October 25, 2015	KT0911H
121	4	"Veni, Vidi, Ceviche"	Ceviche; Patty melt; Snickerdoodles	Jet Tila	$3,800	November 1, 2015	KT0912H
122	5	"Superstar Sabotage: Knife, Knife Baby (Note: In the Superstar Sabotage Tournament Preliminary Rounds, each of the losing contestants still received $2,500 for their charities)"	Full English breakfast; Tofu dish; Angel food cake	Simon Majumdar	$9,200	November 4, 2015	KT1108H
123	6	"The Hunt for Bread October (Note: "The Hunt for Bread October" was a special Military/Veterans Day Special which featured four contestants from the military; one from each of the Army, Navy, Air Force, and Marine Corps.)"	Steak and eggs; Submarine sandwich; Red, white and blue dessert	Antonia Lofaso	$10,200	November 8, 2015	KT0913H
124	7	"Superstar Sabotage: All About the Bouillabaisse"	Swedish pancakes; Bouillabaisse; Brownie sundae	Antonia Lofaso	$6,400	November 11, 2015	KT1109H
125	8	"I'm Thanksgiving Up (Note: "I'm Thanksgiving Up" was a special Thanksgiving episode)"	Thanksgiving dinner; Turkey tacos; Sweet potato pie	Antonia Lofaso	$11,000	November 15, 2015	KT1008H
126	9	"Superstar Sabotage: Deep Pu Pu"	Pu pu platter; Tortellini; Whoopie pie	Jet Tila	$20,000 (Note: The winner of "Superstar Sabotage: Deep Pu Pu" finished with $18,900, but Brown decided to return $1,100 in fines that the chef had paid for failing to comply with a sabotage)	November 18, 2015	KT1110H
127	10	"Fajita the Moment"	Hushpuppies; Fajitas; Bread pudding	Antonia Lofaso	$15,500	November 22, 2015	KT1001H
128	11	"Superstar Sabotage: Burrito the Line"	Denver omelette; Wet burrito; New York cheesecake	Jet Tila	$5,700	November 25, 2015	KT1111H
129	12	"I Love It When You Call Me Big Papaya"	Green papaya salad; Barbecue bacon cheeseburger; Spice cake	Antonia Lofaso	$18,600	November 29, 2015	KT1002H
130	13	"Superstar Sabotage Finale: It's Raining Ramen"	Fish sticks; Ramen; Dessert	Simon Majumdar	$22,000 (Note: In the Superstar Sabotage Finale, each of the chefs were given $50,000 to start instead of the usual $25,000)	December 2, 2015	KT1112H

=== Season 11 ===
No. overall	No. in season	Title	Dishes	Judge	Amount Won	Original release date	Prod. code
131	1	"A Dingo Ate My Dutch Baby"	Dutch baby pancake; Bangers and mash; Ginger snap cookies	Simon Majumdar	$20,000	December 6, 2015	KT1004H
132	2	"Naughty vs. Nice (Note: "Naughty vs. Nice" and "Holi-Dazed and Confused" were special Holiday episodes that brought back previous contestants) (Note: The returning contestants were Jackie Mozza (Season 6: Alton and the Chocolate Factory), Elliot Farmer, Kathy Poland (Season 8: The Best of the Worst), and Jean-Paul Peluffo (Season 9: We Came, We See-Sawed, We Conquered))"	Party dip; Beef tenderloin dinner; Snack for Santa	Antonia Lofaso	$800	December 9, 2015	KT1012H
133	3	"We Don't Need Another Gyro"	Crab Cake Benedict; Gyro; Rhubarb pie	Simon Majumdar	$10,700	December 13, 2015	KT1005H
134	4	"Holi-Dazed and Confused (Note: The returning contestants were Jake Vorono (Season 6: Thanks, but No Thanksgiving), Loreal Gavin (Season 8: Circus Spectacular), Jess Roy (Season 8: Molasses, Mo' Problems), and Jemil Johnson (Season 9: Greece Lightning))"	Holiday quiche; Duck dinner; Eggnog dessert	Jet Tila	$3,200	December 16, 2015	KT1013H
135	5	"Get Rich or Die Frying"	Hawaiian pizza; Shrimp stir fry; Candy bar	Jet Tila	$10,900	December 20, 2015	KT1006H
136	6	"I Crisped a Grill and Liked It"	Potato pancakes; Tandoori chicken; Crisp	Simon Majumdar	$13,500	December 27, 2015	KT1007H
137	7	"Cacciatore by His Toe"	Potato salad; Chicken cacciatore; Doughnuts	Simon Majumdar	$6,500	January 3, 2016	KT1003H
138	8	"50 Shades of Sorbet"	Breakfast pizza; Jalapeño poppers; Sorbet	Antonia Lofaso	$17,600	January 10, 2016	KT1009H
139	9	"Showdown at the Croquet Corral"	Croquettes; Yakitori; Bananas Foster	Jet Tila	$5,000	January 17, 2016	KT1010H
140	10	"Hit Me With Your Best Pho"	Pho; Flatbread; Cherries jubilee	Simon Majumdar	$20,900	January 24, 2016	KT1011H
141	11	"When Cherry Met Salad"	Chopped salad; Tagine; Cherry pie	Ted Allen	$9,000	January 31, 2016	KT1101H
142	12	"Chocotage XXL (Note: "Chocotage XXL" was a special Valentine's Day/Chocolate episode)"	Chocolate chip cookie dessert; Molé; Chocolate marble cake	Simon Majumdar	$9,000	February 14, 2016	KT1107H
143	13	"Cashew If You Can"	Cocktail and hors d'oeuvre; Cashew chicken; Tres leches cake	Simon Majumdar	$9,800	February 21, 2016	KT1103H

=== Season 12 ===
Richard Blais became a new recurring judge in Season 12.

No. overall	No. in season	Title	Dishes	Judge	Amount Won	Original release date	Prod. code
144	1	"The One With William Shatner (Note: "The One With William Shatner" was a special Man Cave episode)"	Bacon dish; Burger and onion rings; Booze dessert	William Shatner	$5,900	February 28, 2016	KT1104H
145	2	"Hedwig and the Angry Enchilada"	Breakfast enchilada; Bibimbap; Concrete (Frozen custard milkshake)	Jet Tila	$14,700	March 6, 2016	KT1105H
146	3	"My So-Called Trifle (Note: During the first round, contestant Amber Kohle injured herself and had to withdraw from the competition, the first such occurrence in the show's history. To compensate, none of the remaining three chefs were eliminated at the end of the first round. Instead, the chef with the best dish in the first round would earn an advantage going into the next round, which in this case was having their cash reset back to $25,000. This allowed for a new record for most spent at $35,300 (more than the total amount usable in other episodes of $25,000). This episode ended with a new record for the least won at $300.)"	Stuffed cabbage; Shakshuka; Trifle	Antonia Lofaso	$300	March 13, 2016	KT1106H
147	4	"Duck L'Orange Is the New Black Coffee"	Duck à l'orange; Glazed salmon; Coffee dessert	Jet Tila	$5,500	March 20, 2016	KT1102H
148	5	"Split Happens"	Spring rolls; Brick chicken; Banana split	Jet Tila	$10,000	March 27, 2016	KT1113H
149	6	"Frankly Alton, I Don't Give a Clam"	Biscuits and gravy; Linguine and clams; Ice cream float	Antonia Lofaso	$13,400	April 3, 2016	KT1201H
150	7	"To Kale a Mockingbird"	Kale salad; Poutine; Red velvet cupcakes	Simon Majumdar	$11,800	April 10, 2016	KT1202H
151	8	"The Breakfast and the Furious (Note: "The Breakfast and the Furious" was a special breakfast episode)"	Coffee and pastry; Omelette; Bowl of cereal and milk	Richard Blais	$7,600	April 17, 2016	KT1203H
152	9	"Freaks and Greeks"	Greek salad; Surf and turf; Poppyseed muffin	Jet Tila	$6,600	April 24, 2016	KT1204H
153	10	"The Pesto Times, The Worst of Times"	Pesto dish; Shaking beef; Boston cream pie	Richard Blais	$8,400	May 1, 2016	KT1206H
154	11	"The Mother of All Episodes (Note: "The Mother of All Episodes" was a special Mother's Day episode where mother and daughter teams competed, for a total of eight contestants)"	Breakfast in bed; Lasagna; Chocolate-covered dessert	Jet Tila	$11,900	May 8, 2016	KT1207H
155	12	"Shot Through the Tart"	Pain perdu; Meatloaf; Raspberry tart	Monti Carlo	$1,400	May 15, 2016	KT1208H
156	13	"License to Grill (Note: "License to Grill" was a special grilling episode)"	Hamburger; Grilled chicken dinner; Grilled dessert	Simon Majumdar	$9,300	May 22, 2016	KT1205H

=== Season 13 ===
No. overall	No. in season	Title	Dishes	Judge	Amount Won	Original release date	Prod. code
157	1	"Time Warp Tournament: 1950s"	American breakfast; TV dinner; Milkshake and french fries	Simon Majumdar	$19,200	June 1, 2016	KT1302H
158	2	"Time Warp Tournament: 1960s"	Party punch and snack; Chicken Kiev; Banana pudding	Jet Tila	$9,200	June 8, 2016	KT1303H
159	3	"Time Warp Tournament: 1970s"	Hamburger macaroni and cheese; Quiche; Crêpe Suzette	Richard Blais	$1,300	June 15, 2016	KT1304H
160	4	"Time Warp Tournament: 1980s"	Chinese chicken salad; Blackened fish; Toaster pastry	Antonia Lofaso	$10,300	June 22, 2016	KT1305H
161	5	"Time Warp Tournament Grand Finale: 1990s"	Barbecue chicken pizza; Fried calamari; Cookie dough ice cream	Marc Summers	$11,600 (Note: The Time Warp Tournament Finale had each of the contestants start with the usual $25,000, the first such occurrence in a Cutthroat Kitchen tournament finale)	June 29, 2016	KT1306H
162	6	"Gettin' Judgey with It (Note: "Gettin' Judgey with It" was a special episode alternatively titled "Judges' Dread" where the judges competed (for a second time)) (Note: The losing contestants of "Gettin' Judgey with It" each received $2,500 for their charities)"	Poached egg breakfast; Grain bowl; Brownie sundae	Eric Greenspan	$9,300	July 6, 2016	KT1210H
163	7	"You Dim Some, You Lose Some"	Bao; Penne alla vodka; Sugar cookies	Sherry Yard	$10,200	July 13, 2016	KT1211H
164	8	"The Upper Crustacean"	Lobster roll; Navy bean soup; Peanut butter cookies	Antonia Lofaso	$17,500	July 20, 2016	KT1209H
165	9	"The Tong and Short of It"	Cobb salad; Moo shu; Baked Alaska	Richard Blais	$14,800	July 27, 2016	KT1212H
166	10	"He's Just a Po' Boy"	Catfish po' boy; Loco moco; Shoofly pie	Anne Burrell	$8,900	August 3, 2016	KT1213H
167	11	"Superhero Sabotage: The Age of Alton (Note: "Superhero Sabotage: The Age of Alton" was a special superhero episode)"	Hero sandwich; Gyro; Superfood dessert	Antonia Lofaso	$1,700	August 10, 2016	KT1301H
168	12	"Fry Hard (Note: "Fry Hard" was a special fried food episode.) (Note: Contestant Amber Kohle previously appeared in the episode "My So Called Trifle", but was brought back due to a mid-round injury that forced her to withdraw from the competition in her original episode. As a safety measure, Alton gave her cut-resistant gloves to wear during the competition.)"	Fish and chips; Fried chicken; Churro ice cream sandwich	Jet Tila	$11,800	August 17, 2016	KT1308H

=== Season 14 ===
No. overall	No. in season	Title	Dishes	Judge	Amount Won	Original release date	Prod. code
169	1	"Camp Cutthroat 2: Alton's Revenge: Heat One, Axe to Grind"	Scramble; Meat and potatoes; Dessert pancakes	Jet Tila	$6,400	August 24, 2016	KTSP08H
170	2	"Camp Cutthroat 2: Alton's Revenge: Heat Two, Big Foot Loose"	Hunter's stew; Trail lunch; Skillet cookie	Antonia Lofaso	$3,800	August 31, 2016	KTSP09H
171	3	"Camp Cutthroat 2: Alton's Revenge: Heat Three, We're Gonna Need a Bigger Boat"	Waffle breakfast; Grilled fish; Fruit crumble	Simon Majumdar	$4,500	September 7, 2016	KTSP10H
172	4	"Camp Cutthroat 2: Alton's Revenge: Heat Four, How To Get Away With Burger"	Breakfast burrito; Burger; Trail mix dessert	Richard Blais	$16,200	September 14, 2016	KTSP11H
173	5	"Camp Cutthroat 2: Alton's Revenge: Finale, The Great Out S'mores"	Loaded chili dog; Game dish; S'more dessert	Richard Blais	$38,700 (Note: In the Camp Cutthroat Finale, each of the contestants were given $50,000 to start instead of the usual $25,000)	September 21, 2016	KTSP12H
174	6	"Tournament of Terror: Heat One"	Liver and fava beans; Garlic chicken; Blood orange dessert	Richard Blais	$5,100	September 28, 2016	KT1402H
175	7	"Tournament of Terror: Heat Two"	Deviled eggs; Spider rolls; Flambe dessert	Antonia Lofaso	$14,100	October 5, 2016	KT1401H
176	8	"Tournament of Terror: Heat Three"	Frog legs; Witch's stew; Devil's food cake	Jet Tila	$9,900	October 10, 2016	KT1403H
177	9	"Tournament of Terror: Heat Four"	Steak tartare; Fra Diavolo; Pumpkin dessert	Simon Majumdar	$16,800	October 23, 2016	KT1404H
178	10	"Tournament of Terror: Finale"	Loaded Bloody Mary; Bone-in dish; Candy	Anne Burrell	$9,000 (Note: The contestants in the Tournament of Terror Finale were given the regular $25,000 to start)	October 30, 2016	KT1405H
179	11	"The Chefshank Redemption (Note: "The Chefshank Redemption" was a special redemption episode that brought back previous contestants that were eliminated in the first round of their original episode) (Note: The returning contestants were Grandma Doris (Season 9: Grandma-tage), Mikery Hatfield (Season 9: Sabootage 2: Electric Boo-Galoo), Harry Soo (Season 12: License to Grill), and Al Mclean (from a currently unaired episode titled "Mission Impastable"))"	Redemption Dish (Note: Each of the chefs were asked to make the same dish from their original episode that they were eliminated by. There were no auctions in this round as they were all tasked to face the same sabotages that sent them home in their original episode) (Note: The dishes were stuffed French toast (Doris), a wrap (Mikery), hamburger (Harry), and a Breakfast to-go (Al)); Quiche Lorraine/French onion soup (Note: For the first time in the show's history, Alton changed the assigned dish midway through the round. The chefs were initially tasked to make a Quiche lorraine, but with 15 minutes left in the challenge the dish was changed to French onion soup); Pineapple upside-down cake (Note: For the second time in the show's history, both contestants in the final round had to do all of the sabotages assigned, there were no auctions. The first time was in the Camp Cutthroat 2 Finale)	Antonia Lofaso	$25,000	December 28, 2016	KT1406H
180	12	"Fry-Day Night Bites (Note: "Fry-Day Night Bites" was a special Super Bowl episode. As with the previous special "The Supper Bowl", it was referred to as "The Big Game")"	Loaded nachos; Fried chicken sandwich; Ice cream sandwich	Chad Johnson	$13,500	February 1, 2017	KT1501H
181	13	"Valentine's Day Massacre (Note: "Valentine's Day Massacre" was a special Valentine's day episode where four teams of couples competed)"	Chocolate chip pancakes; Spaghetti and meatballs; Romantic strawberry dessert	Jet Tila and Ali Tila	$600	February 8, 2017	KT1503H

=== Season 15 ===
No. overall	No. in season	Title	Dishes	Judge	Amount Won	Original release date	Prod. code
182	1	"Bolognesed and Confused"	Shrimp stir fry; Pasta bolognese; Bundt cake	Antonia Lofaso	$9,500	June 7, 2017	KT1506H
183	2	"The Good, the Hash, and the Ugly (Note: "The Good, and Hash, and the Ugly" was a special Cowboy episode)"	Breakfast hash; Cowboy steak dinner; Cornbread dessert	Clay Walker	$6,000	June 14, 2017	KT1508H
184	3	"Domo Arigato, Mr. Gelato"	Breakfast waffle sandwich; Korean barbecue; Gelato and pizzelle	Simon Majumdar	$13,800 (Note: In "Domo Arigato, Mr. Gelato", Simon Majumdar announced a tie between the two contestants in the final round. Both chefs got to keep the money they had left. This is the second tie in the history of Cutthroat Kitchen, the first being in "Crabs of Steel") $600	June 21, 2017	KT1502H
185	4	"Do You Really Wonton Hurt Me?"	Popcorn dish; Wonton soup; Piña colada dessert	Donal Skehan	$10,600	June 28, 2017 (Note: Aired in Australia on February 11, 2017)	KT1313H
186	5	"Profiterollin' with the Homeys"	Flautas; Pork chops with apple sauce; Profiteroles	Jet Tila	$5,700	June 28, 2017	KT1504H
187	6	"Fast Times at Cutthroat High (Note: "Fast Times At Cutthroat High" was a special High School episode)"	Carpool breakfast; Sack lunch; After school snack	Duff Goldman	$8,500	July 5, 2017 (Note: Aired in Australia on April 11, 2017)	KT1409H
188	7	"I Ain't Afraid of No Toast"	Toast; Shish kabobs; Butterscotch dessert	Jet Tila	$13,600	July 12, 2017 (Note: Aired in Australia on January 28, 2017)	KT1309H
189	8	"How Does That Crab Ya?"	Breakfast nachos; Crab melt; Filled cupcakes	Richard Blais	$9,700	July 19, 2017	KT1410H

=== Season 16 ===
No. overall	No. in season	Title	Dishes	Judge	Amount Won	Original release date	Prod. code
190	1	"Currywurst. Episode. Ever."	Torta; Currywurst; Blueberry muffins	Antonia Lofaso	$9,800	January 21, 2017 (Australia)	KT1307H
191	2	"Obi-Wan Cannoli"	Grilled cheese sandwich with tomato soup; Moussaka; Cannoli	Richard Blais	$11,200	February 4, 2017 (Australia)	KT1310H
192	3	"Mission Impastable"	Breakfast to go; Baked pasta; Linzer cookies	Simon Majumdar	$44,000 (Note: The winner took a deal at the beginning of the episode to "purchase" a chance to win more than $25,000. They would give back their initial $25,000 (meaning they could not bid on any sabotages for the whole competition) for a chance to win $50,000. Since two people wanted the opportunity, a reverse auction was held where the final amount settled was $44,000. This is the second time in the show's history this type of deal was made. The first was in "To Kale a Mockingbird")	February 4, 2017 (Australia)	KT1311H
193	4	"Bear Force One"	Frittata; Sesame noodles; Bear claws	Simon Majumdar	$11,000	February 11, 2017 (Australia)	KT1312H
194	5	"I'm Kind Of A Big Dill"	Loaded hash browns; Cuban sandwich; Tiramisu	Antonia Lofaso	$4,900	April 4, 2017 (Australia); September 8, 2019 (United States)	KT1407H
195	6	"For Alton Lang Syne (Note: "For Alton Lang Syne" was a special New Year's resolution episode)"	Hangover breakfast; Salad; Cheat day dessert	Daphne Oz	$13,500	April 4, 2017 (Australia); October 1, 2019 (Amazon Video)	KT1408H
196	7	"Fowl Play (Note: "Fowl Play" was a special Thanksgiving episode. Four previous contestants returned, each of them bringing along a family member to team up with. This is a third episode where four teams competed. The returning contestants were Betty Fraser (Season 11: I Crisped a Grill and Liked It) who teamed with her sister, Golden Moore (Season 12: Split Happens) who also teamed with her sister, Cris Sanchez (Season 12: Shot Through the Tart) who teamed with his wife and Ryan Sherman (Season 13: He's Just a Po' Boy) who teamed with his brother.)"	Thanksgiving dinner; Leftover turkey dish; Pumpkin pie	Richard Blais and Jazmin Blais	$13,000	April 18, 2017 (Australia); September 10, 2019 (Amazon Video)	KT1411H
197	8	"Hold Me Closer, Fire Dancer"	Shepherd's pie; Hawaiian barbecue plate; Lemon bar	Richard Blais	$12,900	April 18, 2017 (Australia); September 15, 2019 (United States)	KT1412H
198	9	"A Very Cutthroat Christmas (Note: "A Very Cutthroat Christmas" was a special Holiday episode)"	Family holiday dish; Feast of the Seven Fishes; Gingerbread dessert	Simon Majumdar (Round 1); Jet Tila (Round 2); Richard Blais (Round 3)	$5,500	April 25, 2017 (Australia); September 15, 2019 (Amazon Video)	KT1413H
