= Grace Young =

Grace Young may refer to:

- Grace Kama'iku'i Young Rooke (born 1808), Hawaiian high chietess
- Grace Chisholm Young (born 1868), English mathematician
- Grace Young (author), Chinese cuisine cookbook author
- Grace Young (field hockey) (born 2002), Australian field hockey player
