= Cutthroat Kitchen =

American television series

- Genre: Reality competition; Cookery
- Starring: Alton Brown
- Judges: Simon Majumdar; Antonia Lofaso; Jet Tila; Richard Blais
- Country of origin: United States
- Original language: English
- No. of seasons: 15
- No. of episodes: 189 + 1 special (list of episodes)

Production
- Executive producers: Shauna Minoprio; Julia Cassidy; Michael Davies; Melissa Stokes; Alton Brown
- Running time: 60 minutes
- Production company: Embassy Row

Original release
- Network: Food Network
- Release: August 11, 2013 – July 19, 2017

Cutthroat Kitchen is an American cooking show hosted by Alton Brown that aired on the Food Network from August 11, 2013 to July 19, 2017. It features four chefs competing in a three-round elimination cooking competition. The contestants face auctions in which they can purchase opportunities to sabotage one another. Each chef is given $25,000 at the start of the show; the person left standing keeps whatever money they have not spent in the auctions. The show ended on its 15th season in July 2017. The series shares some basic elements with other four-chef, three-round elimination-style competitions on Food Network including Chopped and Guy's Grocery Games. Numerous Cutthroat Kitchen contestants have competed on these shows.

== Format ==
Each episode features four chefs competing in a three-round elimination contest. Brown gives each chef $25,000 cash before the first round; for insurance reasons, prop money is used instead of actual currency. The chefs each have their own stations to prepare and cook food, and the kitchen includes a wide range of other tools and equipment as well as a pantry stocked with ingredients.

In each round, the chefs are assigned a dish to create and must do so within a set time limit, typically 30 minutes. Although most dishes are specific, such as macaroni and cheese, French toast, or fish and chips, Brown occasionally issues a broader challenge such as British pub food or a skillet breakfast. Other than in the first season, and a handful of later episodes, the first two rounds typically feature savory dishes and the third features a dessert. After the dish is announced, the chefs have one minute to collect all of the ingredients they need from the pantry in one trip, using metal hand-held shopping baskets. When the time runs out, Brown shuts the pantry doors and confiscates one ingredient from any chefs who are still inside before letting them leave.

In each of the first two rounds, Brown follows the shopping time by auctioning off a series of items that the chefs can use to sabotage one another or, on occasion, give themselves an advantage. Sabotage types include equipment/ingredient changes, restrictions on movement freedom, and loss of cooking time. Sabotages are often loosely themed around the assigned dish, such as being required to follow a maze of velvet ropes in order to move between prep and cook stations while making red velvet cake. The highest bidder pays for the item out of their remaining funds, and if necessary, decides which opponent(s) will face the sabotage. The auctions are followed by the chefs preparing and plating their dishes within a set length of time, most commonly 30 minutes. Brown occasionally offers additional auctions during the cooking time. In the final round, the two remaining chefs begin cooking immediately after shopping for their ingredients, and the auctions take place while they are working. As each round progresses, Brown offers comments (delivered as a piece to camera) on the chefs' cooking methods and strategies to compensate for the sabotages. On occasion, Brown holds an auction before the chefs enter the pantry, offering a sabotage that can be used to hinder a chef's ability to move or carry ingredients.

Once the cooking time has expired, all visible indication of the sabotages is removed from the set and a judge is brought into the kitchen to evaluate the dishes. In order to ensure an unbiased opinion, the judge is sequestered in an isolation room during each round and is not told about any of the sabotages that were in effect. Each dish is judged solely on three criteria: taste, presentation, and representation of the original dish assigned. The chefs are given a chance to describe and explain their dish and choices. They may not complain in general or disclose any sabotages they faced, but they may try to explain (truthfully or otherwise) the cooking choices they made or were forced to make.

The chef whose dish is judged the least satisfactory is eliminated from the game and forfeits all of their remaining money. After the final round, the surviving chef keeps whatever money they have not spent on auction items. Two episodes have ended in a tie, with both chefs keeping their remaining money.

== Judges ==
Jet Tila, Simon Majumdar, and Antonia Lofaso served as regular judges throughout the show. In 2016, Richard Blais became a regular judge as well, starting with the Season 12 episode "The Breakfast and the Furious." With the exception of "Judging Judges" and "Valentine's Day Massacre" (see below), each episode features only one judge who evaluates the dishes in every round. The contestants do not learn the judge's identity until they enter the kitchen at the end of the first round, and the judge is not told in advance about any of the assigned dishes.

In the Season 3 episode "Judging Judges," Lofaso, Tila, Majumdar and former guest judge Geoffrey Zakarian competed against each other with their winnings going to a charity of their choice. Lofaso won the competition with $22,000 remaining, but her charity received the full $25,000; the other three chefs each received $5,000 for their charities.

Guest judges have appeared in some episodes, as shown below.

| Guest Judge | Episode |
|---|---|
| Giada De Laurentiis | "The Yolk's on You" (Season 2) |
| Geoffrey Zakarian | "Well, Hot Clam!" (Season 3) |
| Jaime Martin del Campo and Ramiro Arvizu | "Judging Judges" (Season 3), round 1 |
| Daniel Holzman | "Judging Judges" (Season 3), round 2 |
| Sherry Yard | "Judging Judges" (Season 3), round 3 |
| Sherry Yard | "You Dim Some, You Lose Some" (Season 13) |
| Valerie Bertinelli | "Who Tarted?" (Season 6) |
| Anne Burrell | "Whatchoo Taco-ing About, Alton?" (Season 7) |
| Anne Burrell | "He's Just a Po' Boy" (Season 13) |
| Anne Burrell | "Tournament of Terror: Finale" (Season 14) |
| Susan Feniger | "Tikka Me Alton" (Season 8) |
| Susan Feniger | "A River Runs Canoe It" (Season 10) |
| Cat Cora | "All in a Day's Jerk" (Season 8) |
| David Alan Grier | "Taco Dirty to Me" (Season 9) |
| Ted Allen | "When Cherry Met Salad" (Season 11) |
| William Shatner | "The One With William Shatner" (Season 12) |
| Monti Carlo | "Shot Through the Tart" (Season 12) |
| Marc Summers | "Time Warp Tournament Grand Finale: 1990s" (Season 13) |
| Eric Greenspan | "Gettin' Judgey with It" (Season 13) |
| Chad Johnson | "Fry-Day Night Bites" (Season 14) |
| Ali Tila (co-judged with Jet Tila) | "Valentine's Day Massacre" (Season 14) |
| Clay Walker | "The Good, the Hash, and the Ugly" (Season 15) |
| Donal Skehan | "Do You Really Wonton Hurt Me?" (Season 15) |
| Duff Goldman | "Fast Times at Cutthroat High" (Season 15) |

== Tournaments ==
=== Superstar Sabotage Tournament ===
In October 2014, a special five-part celebrity tournament subtitled "Superstar Sabotage" began airing. The contestants competed on behalf of their favorite charities for a potential top prize of $75,000. Four preliminary heats were held, with four chefs participating in each heat. The winners received their unspent money as charity donations and advanced to the finals, where they were given an initial stake of $50,000. All chefs eliminated in the preliminary heats received $2,500 for their charities.

A second Superstar Sabotage tournament premiered in November 2015.

2014 contestants

| Heat/episode | Contestants |
|---|---|
| Superstar Sabotage: Heat One | Michael Psilakis |
| Superstar Sabotage: Heat One | Jeff Mauro |
| Superstar Sabotage: Heat One | Susan Feniger |
| Superstar Sabotage: Heat One | Aarti Sequeira |
| Superstar Sabotage: Heat Two | Nadia Giosia |
| Superstar Sabotage: Heat Two | Justin Warner |
| Superstar Sabotage: Heat Two | Marcel Vigneron |
| Superstar Sabotage: Heat Two | Brian Malarkey |
| Superstar Sabotage: Heat Three | Anne Burrell |
| Superstar Sabotage: Heat Three | Eric Greenspan |
| Superstar Sabotage: Heat Three | Damaris Phillips |
| Superstar Sabotage: Heat Three | Johnny Iuzzini |
| Superstar Sabotage: Heat Four | Fabio Viviani |
| Superstar Sabotage: Heat Four | Alex Guarnaschelli |
| Superstar Sabotage: Heat Four | Melissa d'Arabian |
| Superstar Sabotage: Heat Four | Elizabeth Falkner |

2015 contestants

| Heat/episode | Contestants |
|---|---|
| Superstar Sabotage: Knife, Knife Baby | Richard Blais |
| Superstar Sabotage: Knife, Knife Baby | Cat Cora |
| Superstar Sabotage: Knife, Knife Baby | Aarti Sequeira |
| Superstar Sabotage: Knife, Knife Baby | Melissa d'Arabian |
| Superstar Sabotage: All About the Bouillabaisse | Justin Warner |
| Superstar Sabotage: All About the Bouillabaisse | Eric Greenspan |
| Superstar Sabotage: All About the Bouillabaisse | Kelsey Nixon |
| Superstar Sabotage: All About the Bouillabaisse | Josh Elkin |
| Superstar Sabotage: Deep Pu Pu | Fabio Viviani |
| Superstar Sabotage: Deep Pu Pu | Claire Robinson |
| Superstar Sabotage: Deep Pu Pu | Rocco DiSpirito |
| Superstar Sabotage: Deep Pu Pu | Duff Goldman |
| Superstar Sabotage: Burrito the Line | Alex Guarnaschelli |
| Superstar Sabotage: Burrito the Line | Bobby Deen |
| Superstar Sabotage: Burrito the Line | Marcel Vigneron |
| Superstar Sabotage: Burrito the Line | Sherry Yard |

=== Evilicious Tournament ===
From April 19 to May 17, 2015, Cutthroat Kitchen aired a five-part "Evilicious" Tournament featuring 16 of the show's most memorable contestants. Similar to Superstar Sabotage, this tournament consisted of four preliminary heats, with the winners keeping their unspent money and advancing to the final round for a chance to win up to $50,000 more.

Contestants

| Heat/episode | Contestants | Original episodes |
|---|---|---|
| Evilicious: Canoe Jack City | Robert Burmeister | Season 2: Foul Play |
| Evilicious: Canoe Jack City | Matthew Grunwald | Season 3: Tso Good |
| Evilicious: Canoe Jack City | Morgan Bonazzola | Season 4: I Can't Believe It's Not Udder |
| Evilicious: Canoe Jack City | Tom Lin | Season 4: Welcome to the Jungle |
| Evilicious: Frying First Class | Kori Sutton | Season 1: Steak Out |
| Evilicious: Frying First Class | Leelee Wiginton | Season 2: Wham, Clam, Thank You, Ma'am |
| Evilicious: Frying First Class | Sammy Monsour | Season 3: The Rice Stuff |
| Evilicious: Frying First Class | Jason Febres | Season 3: Ladel-ayheehoo |
| Evilicious: 20,000 Leagues Under the Prep Table | Tommy Stevens | Season 3: Hawai'i 5-Oh No! |
| Evilicious: 20,000 Leagues Under the Prep Table | Frances Tariga-Weshnak | Season 3: Hakuna Frittata |
| Evilicious: 20,000 Leagues Under the Prep Table | Jernard Wells | Season 4: Anything but a Cake Walk |
| Evilicious: 20,000 Leagues Under the Prep Table | Alexis Hernandez | Season 5: Crabs of Steel |
| Evilicious: Moo-in' On Up | Aaron Crumbaugh | Season 4: Chili'd to the Bone |
| Evilicious: Moo-in' On Up | Yaku Moton-Spruill | Season 6: The Supper Bowl |
| Evilicious: Moo-in' On Up | Carlos Anthony | Season 7: Gno-cchi to Victory |
| Evilicious: Moo-in' On Up | Tregaye Fraser | Season 7: Whisk-ey Business |

=== Camp Cutthroat ===
From August 12 to September 9, 2015, Cutthroat Kitchen aired a five-episode Camp Cutthroat tournament, which Variety described as Brown "invit[ing] the most elite Cutthroat Kitchen alumni to a secret location deep in the wilderness for an extreme culinary throw down." These episodes were filmed in Santa Clarita, California, at the same movie ranch site as the 2014 FOX reality series Utopia.

Instead of the usual 16 contestants for a tournament, only 12 participated in the 2015 tournament. This meant that each preliminary round featured only three contestants and two rounds. The finale had the usual four contestants and three rounds. Due to there being fewer contestants in the preliminaries, there was potential for more than one mid-round sabotage in the first round in each of the heats. The second and final round of each of the heats also had the contestants bid on auctions before they began cooking their dishes. This was the first such occurrence in the history of Cutthroat Kitchen.

2015 contestants

| Heat/episode | Contestants | Original episodes |
|---|---|---|
| Camp Cutthroat: Porks and Rec | Emmanuel Delcour | Season 2: Pressed or Steamed |
| Camp Cutthroat: Porks and Rec | Ruddy Bello | Season 4: I Like My Peppers Pulverized |
| Camp Cutthroat: Porks and Rec | Monterey Salka | Season 7: Great Egg-Scape |
| Camp Cutthroat: Wet, Hot, American Sabotage | Candice Wilson | Season 4: I Can't Believe It's Not Udder |
| Camp Cutthroat: Wet, Hot, American Sabotage | Jack Taylor | Season 7: Whatchoo Taco'ing About, Alton? |
| Camp Cutthroat: Wet, Hot, American Sabotage | Robyn Almodovar (Note: Almodovar's preliminary heat aired before her original episode did) | Season 9: The Truck Stops Here |
| Camp Cutthroat: Rock Wall Me, Amadeus | Jessica Entzel | Season 2: Melts in Your Pot, Not in Your Hand |
| Camp Cutthroat: Rock Wall Me, Amadeus | Hop Phan | Season 5: S'Mortal Combat |
| Camp Cutthroat: Rock Wall Me, Amadeus | Clay Carnes | Season 7: Great Egg-Scape |
| Camp Cutthroat: If It Bleeds, We Can Skillet | Emily Ellyn | Season 7: Whatchoo Taco'ing About, Alton? |
| Camp Cutthroat: If It Bleeds, We Can Skillet | Trevor Ball | Season 7: Great Egg-Scape |
| Camp Cutthroat: If It Bleeds, We Can Skillet | DeMarco Ellis | Season 8: Tikka Me Alton |

A second Camp Cutthroat Tournament, titled Camp Cutthroat 2: Alton's Revenge began airing August 2016. The 2016 Tournament brought back 16 contestants and was filmed in Big Bear, California. No auctions were held in the last round of the finale. Instead, both chefs were subjected to conditions of simulated warfare, collecting ingredients and prepping/cooking under a bombardment of water balloons.

2016 contestants

| Heat/episode | Contestants | Original episodes |
|---|---|---|
| Camp Cutthroat 2: Alton's Revenge: Heat One, Axe to Grind | Willie Box | Season 11: A Dingo Ate My Dutch Baby |
| Camp Cutthroat 2: Alton's Revenge: Heat One, Axe to Grind | Vincent Purcell | Season 12: The Breakfast and the Furious |
| Camp Cutthroat 2: Alton's Revenge: Heat One, Axe to Grind | Kate Von Schledorn | Season 12: The Breakfast and the Furious |
| Camp Cutthroat 2: Alton's Revenge: Heat One, Axe to Grind | Rue Rusike | Season 12: Shot Through the Tart |
| Camp Cutthroat 2: Alton's Revenge: Heat Two, Big Foot Loose | Mike Minor | Season 12: My So-Called Trifle |
| Camp Cutthroat 2: Alton's Revenge: Heat Two, Big Foot Loose | Razia "Raz" Sabour | Season 12: Duck L'Orange Is the New Black Coffee |
| Camp Cutthroat 2: Alton's Revenge: Heat Two, Big Foot Loose | Terry Matthews | Season 12: License to Grill |
| Camp Cutthroat 2: Alton's Revenge: Heat Two, Big Foot Loose | Greg Akahoshi | Season 13: The Upper Crustacean |
| Camp Cutthroat 2: Alton's Revenge: Heat Three, We're Gonna Need a Bigger Boat | Ulka Mohanty | Season 1: Vive le Sabotage |
| Camp Cutthroat 2: Alton's Revenge: Heat Three, We're Gonna Need a Bigger Boat | Aaron Crumbaugh (Note: Third separate appearance on Cutthroat Kitchen) (Note: Contestant in the Evilicious Tournament) | Season 4: Chili'd to the Bone |
| Camp Cutthroat 2: Alton's Revenge: Heat Three, We're Gonna Need a Bigger Boat | Daniel Angerer | Season 7: Lamb-a Dama Ding Dong |
| Camp Cutthroat 2: Alton's Revenge: Heat Three, We're Gonna Need a Bigger Boat | Sidney Blackwell | Season 10: I'm Thanksgiving Up |
| Camp Cutthroat 2: Alton's Revenge: Heat Four, How To Get Away With Burger | Michael Gabriel | Season 12: My So-Called Trifle |
| Camp Cutthroat 2: Alton's Revenge: Heat Four, How To Get Away With Burger | Kenneth Thornhill | Season 12: Duck L'Orange Is the New Black Coffee |
| Camp Cutthroat 2: Alton's Revenge: Heat Four, How To Get Away With Burger | Niko Scimone | Season 12: Frankly Alton, I Don't Give a Clam |
| Camp Cutthroat 2: Alton's Revenge: Heat Four, How To Get Away With Burger | Emilia Cirker | Season 13: The Tong and Short of It |

=== Time Warp Tournament ===
In June 2016, a special "Time Warp" Tournament aired. All 16 returning contestants were the winners of their original episodes. Each of the four heats and the finale featured dishes and sabotages from different decades, from the 1950s-80s in the four heats until the 1990s in the finale. This is the first tournament where the chefs in the finale were given the standard $25,000 to start. In all previous tournaments the chefs in the finale started with $50,000.

Contestants

| Heat/episode | Contestants | Original episodes |
|---|---|---|
| Time Warp Tournament: 1950s | Chris Gentile | Season 2: Duck, Duck, Gnocchi |
| Time Warp Tournament: 1950s | Dwayne Ingraham | Season 6: Alton and the Chocolate Factory |
| Time Warp Tournament: 1950s | Jess Roy (Note: Third separate appearance on Cutthroat Kitchen) (Note: Also competed in the Holiday special "Holi-Dazed and Confused") | Season 8: Molasses Mo' Problems |
| Time Warp Tournament: 1950s | Guilherme Barreto | Season 10: Actions Speak Chowder Than Words |
| Time Warp Tournament: 1960s | Perry Pollaci | Season 3: Life's a Mystery... Meat |
| Time Warp Tournament: 1960s | DeMarco Ellis (Note: Contestant in the 2015 Camp Cutthroat tournament) | Season 8: Tikka Me Alton |
| Time Warp Tournament: 1960s | Nancy Manlove | Season 9: Grandma-tage |
| Time Warp Tournament: 1960s | Joe Rego | Season 11: Cacciatore by His Toe |
| Time Warp Tournament: 1970s | Chris Mortenson | Season 1: Un-Holy Trinity |
| Time Warp Tournament: 1970s | Clay Carnes | Season 7: Great Egg-Scape |
| Time Warp Tournament: 1970s | Adia Benson | Season 9: Sabootage 2: Electric Boo-Galoo |
| Time Warp Tournament: 1970s | Martha Esquivel | Season 11: Hit Me With Your Best Pho |
| Time Warp Tournament: 1980s | Won Kim | Season 6: Who Tarted? |
| Time Warp Tournament: 1980s | Craig Jones | Season 8: Carne Diem |
| Time Warp Tournament: 1980s | Guy Clark | Season 8: All in a Day's Jerk |
| Time Warp Tournament: 1980s | Elizabeth Solheim | Season 10: Fajita the Moment |

=== Tournament of Terror ===
On September 28, 2016 a Halloween themed tournament, titled Tournament of Terror began airing. It brought back 16 previous contestants for a chance to win up to $50,000. The tournament concluded on October 30, 2016.

Contestants

| Heat/episode | Contestants | Original episodes |
|---|---|---|
| Tournament of Terror: Heat One | Janet Ross | Season 3: Chain of Tools |
| Tournament of Terror: Heat One | Rouha Sadighi | Season 7: Live and Let Diner |
| Tournament of Terror: Heat One | Irvin Williams Jr. | Season 9: We Came, We See-Sawed, We Conquered |
| Tournament of Terror: Heat One | Trevor McGrath | Season 13: Superhero Sabotage: The Age of Alton |
| Tournament of Terror: Heat Two | Ian Russell | Season 4: When in Rome, Cook On A Scooter |
| Tournament of Terror: Heat Two | Paul Friedman | Season 8: Carne Diem |
| Tournament of Terror: Heat Two | Natalie Beck | Season 8: My Kitchen for a Horse |
| Tournament of Terror: Heat Two | Josephine Proul | Season 13: The Upper Crustacean |
| Tournament of Terror: Heat Three | Ulfet Ralph | Season 9: We Came, We See-Sawed, We Conquered |
| Tournament of Terror: Heat Three | Michael Jenkins | Season 10: A River Runs Canoe It |
| Tournament of Terror: Heat Three | Christian Brown | Season 11: Get Rich or Die Frying |
| Tournament of Terror: Heat Three | Jenny Goycochea | Season 13: You Dim Some, You Lose Some |
| Tournament of Terror: Heat Four | Osvaldo "Oz" Blackaller | Season 5: Tos-ta-da |
| Tournament of Terror: Heat Four | Johnny Messina | Season 6: Thanks, but No Thanksgiving |
| Tournament of Terror: Heat Four | Chase Meneely | Season 12: To Kale a Mockingbird |
| Tournament of Terror: Heat Four | Tiffany Nelson-Ermon | Season 12: The Mother of All Episodes |

== Webisodes ==
Two companion series are available on the Food Network website. In Alton's After-Show, Brown meets with the judge from a particular episode and reveals the sabotages that were in effect during each round of the competition. The two discuss methods by which the chefs could have adjusted their recipes to compensate for these disadvantages. Testing the Sabotages features food stylists' efforts to create assigned dishes while complying with restrictions on ingredients and equipment.

== Production ==
On April 23, 2013, Food Network announced Cutthroat Kitchen as part of a package of new series to be presented on Food Network.

== Episodes ==
| Season | Episodes | Originally released | |
| Season | Episodes | First released | Last released |
|---|---|---|---|
| 1 | 13 | August 11, 2013 | November 3, 2013 |
| 2 | 13 | December 15, 2013 | March 9, 2014 |
| 3 | 13 | March 16, 2014 | June 8, 2014 |
| 4 | 13 | June 22, 2014 | September 14, 2014 |
| 5 | 13 | September 21, 2014 | November 9, 2014 |
| 6 | 13 | November 16, 2014 | February 8, 2015 |
| 7 | 14 | February 15, 2015 | May 17, 2015 |
| 8 | 12 | May 24, 2015 | August 9, 2015 |
| 9 | 13 | August 12, 2015 | October 4, 2015 |
| 10 | 13 | October 11, 2015 | December 2, 2015 |
| 11 | 13 | December 6, 2015 | February 21, 2016 |
| 12 | 13 | February 28, 2016 | May 22, 2016 |
| 13 | 12 | June 1, 2016 | August 17, 2016 |
| 14 | 13 | August 24, 2016 | February 8, 2017 |
| 15 | 8 | June 7, 2017 | July 19, 2017 |
| 16 | 9 | January 21, 2017 | April 25, 2017 |

== History ==
The episode "My So-Called Trifle" (season 12 episode 3, aired on March 13, 2016) included the show's only instance of an elimination due to injury; a chef cut off the tip of her own finger in the first round and was unable to continue. The three remaining chefs advanced to the second round, and the one whose first-round dish was judged the best had their funds restored to the original $25,000. This episode set records for both the highest total spent by one chef ($35,300) and the lowest amount won ($300). This record for least won was only beaten in the newest version, hosted by Brian Malarkey, where one winner won $0 after spending all of their money in the final round.

Alton Brown announced a hiatus in the fall of 2016, in order to work on new projects. However on July 9, 2018, he announced on Twitter, while responding to a fan, that the show was cancelled.

=== Cutthroat Kitchen: Knives Out ===
In April 2025, Food Network announced that the series would be rebooted in May 2025 as Cutthroat Kitchen: Knives Out, with new host Brian Malarkey. Premiering on May 13, 2025, the reboot follows the same basic structure as the original, with four chefs competing to win up to $25,000, but incorporates changes as follows:

- Only two rounds are played instead of three.
- The chefs' remaining funds are displayed on a monitor instead of being represented by bundles of prop money.
- Challenges typically require chefs to create dishes that fit a given category, rather than limiting them to one specific dish.
- The Round 1 challenge is designed to subject the chefs to less-than-ideal cooking conditions and ingredient choices, with each auction conferring an advantage on its winner.
- The Round 2 challenge is played under the same rules as in the original series, frequently featuring an "Exile Kitchen" sabotage whose design and constraints vary from one episode to the next.
- The chef who creates the best dish in Round 1 gets a $1,000 credit added to their remaining funds.
- The dishes in each round are presented to the judge by the host, with no indication of which chef created each one.
- Auction items are presented by no more than one stagehand when necessary, rather than several (referred to as "the Bobs" by Brown in the original series).
