= Julia Child Award =

Culinary award

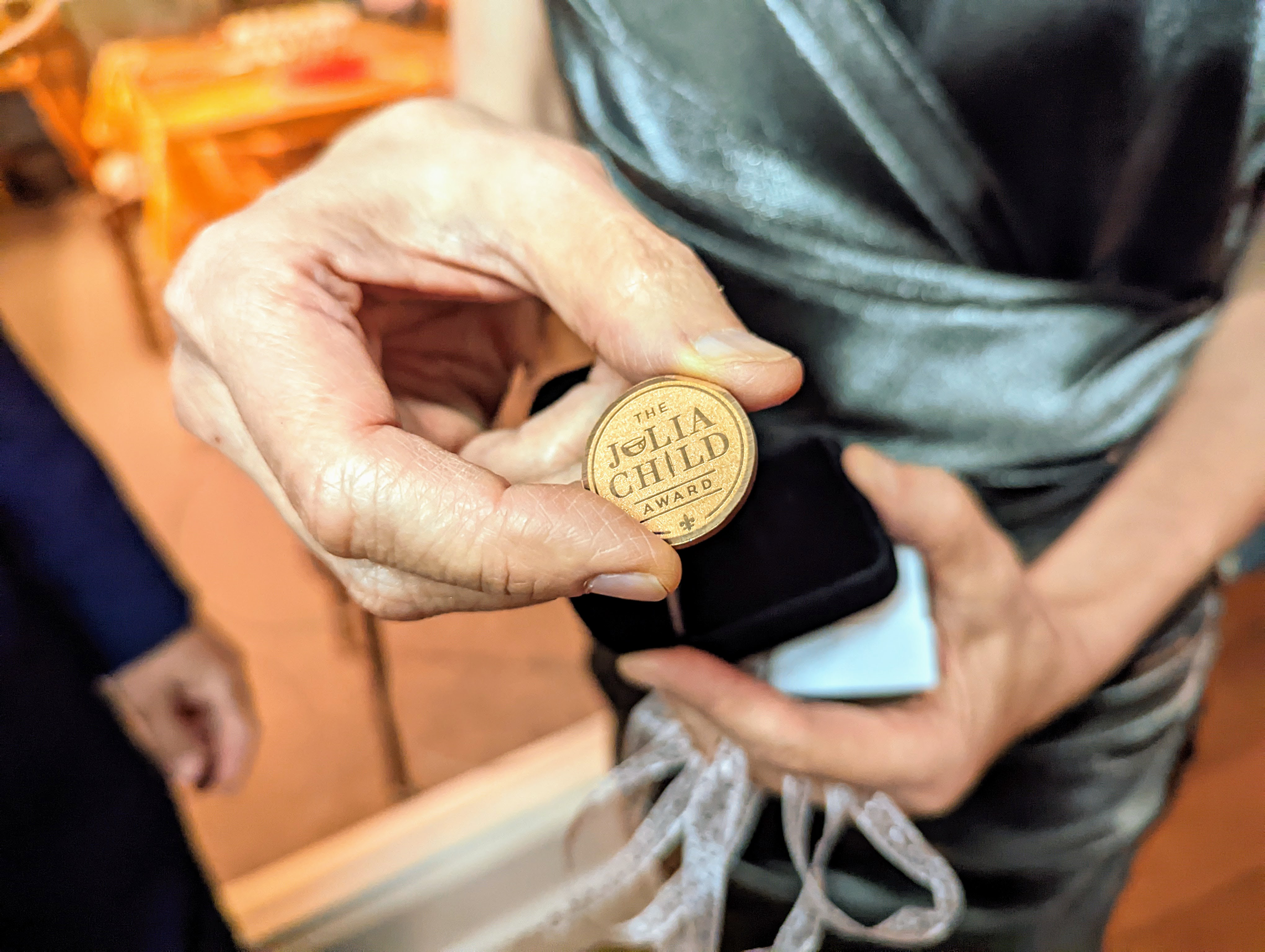
Julia Child Award in 2022, given to Grace Young

The Julia Child Award is an annual award given out by the Julia Child Foundation for Gastronomy and the Culinary Arts to an individual or team that made a "profound and significant difference in how America cooks, eats, and drinks." It was established in 2015 in honor of the chef and television personality Julia Child who established the eponymous foundation in 1995.

Along with the recognition comes a $50,000 grant that the winner designates to a food-related nonprofit organization.

== Recipients ==
- 2015 – Jacques Pépin
- 2016 – Rick Bayless
- 2017 – Danny Meyer
- 2018 – Mary Sue Milliken, Susan Feniger
- 2019 – José Andrés
- 2020 – Danielle Nierenberg
- 2021 – Toni Tipton-Martin
- 2022 - Grace Young
- 2023 - Sean Sherman
- 2024 - Alice Waters
- 2025 - Bobby Stuckey
- 2026 - Sam Kass
