= Mary Sue Milliken =

American chef and restauranteur

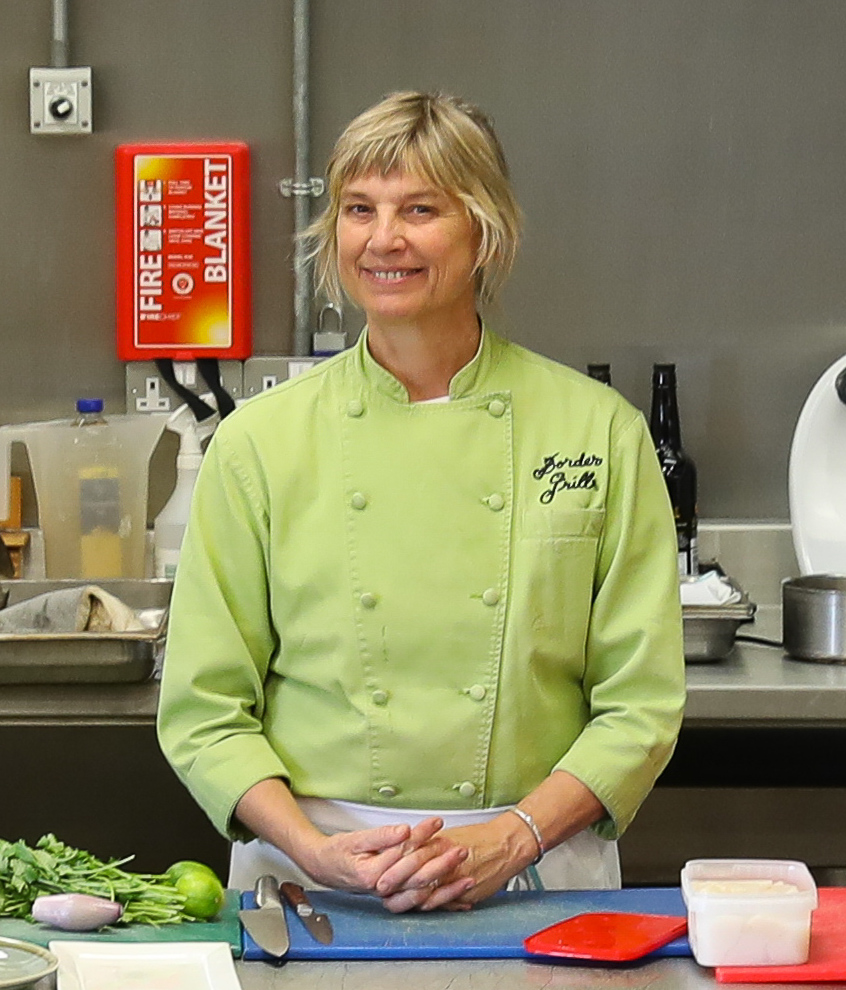
- Occupation(s): Chef, restaurateur, author
- Known for: Too Hot Tamales, Border Grill, SOCALO, CITY Restaurants
- Relatives: Josh Schweitzer (husband)
- Website: https://www.socalo.com/

Mary Sue Milliken is an American chef, restaurateur, cookbook author, and radio and TV personality with a focus on Latin cuisine in the United States.

== Early life and education ==
Milliken is a graduate of Chicago's Washburne Culinary & Hospitality Institute.

== Career ==
=== Restaurants ===
After working together in Chicago and Paris, Milliken and her longtime collaborator, Susan Feniger, settled in Los Angeles where they founded the critically acclaimed City Café in 1981. They eventually expanded to a larger space on La Brea Avenue, renaming the establishment CITY Restaurant. In 1985, they opened the Mexican restaurant Border Grill in the original City Café space, before moving it to Santa Monica in 1990. The restaurant later expanded to Pasadena (closed) and the Mandalay Bay Resort in Las Vegas. Broadening their culinary horizons, Milliken and her partner opened Ciudad in Los Angeles in 1998. The success of the three restaurants has often led Milliken and Feniger to be recognized for single-handedly changing Los Angeles' culinary landscape.

=== Publishing and television/film ===
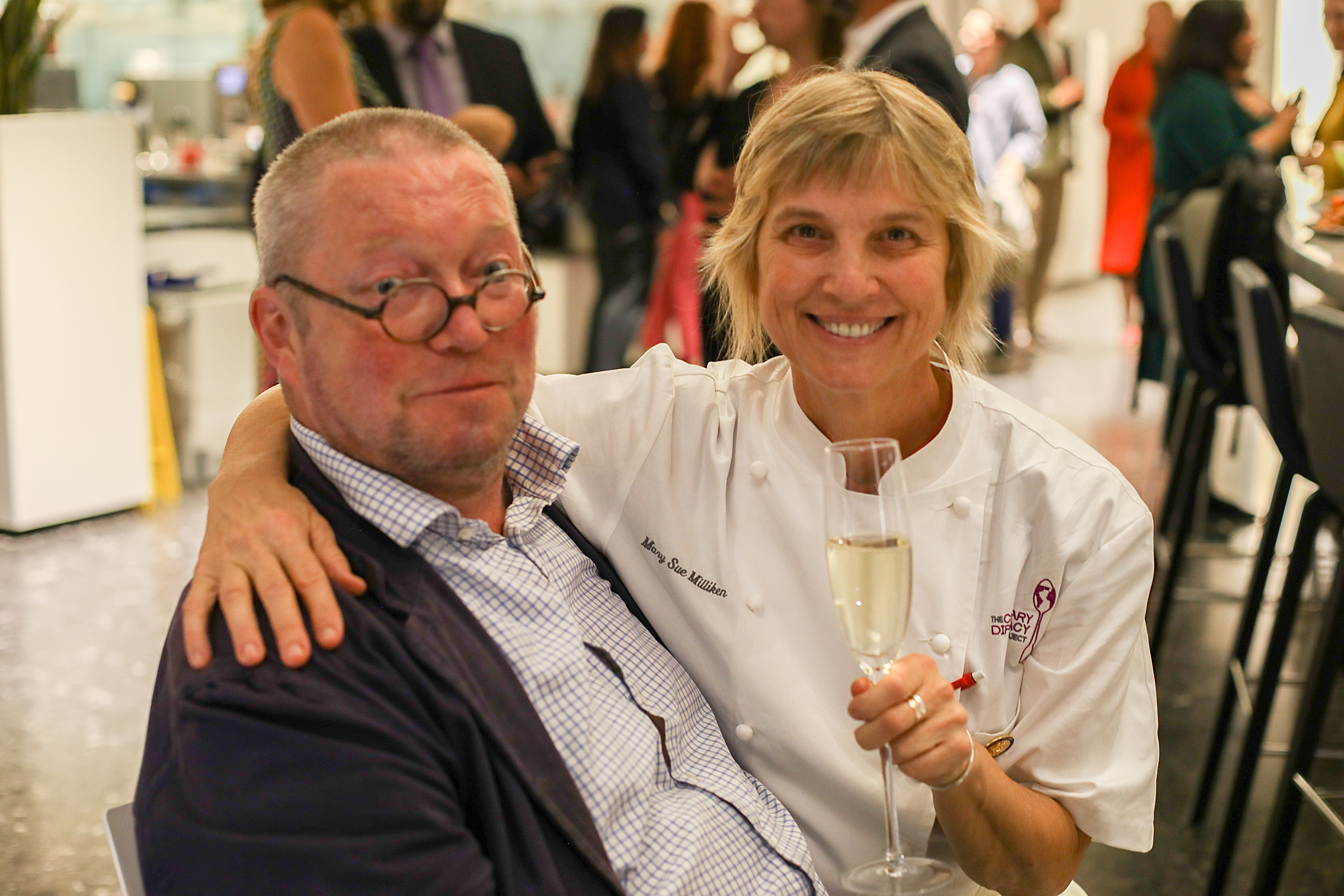
Mary Sue Milliken with chef Fergus Henderson at a dinner at the US Embassy in London in 2019.

In collaboration with Feniger and others, Milliken has published five cookbooks: City Cuisine (1989), Mesa Mexicana (1994), Cantina: The Best of Casual Mexican Cooking (1996), Cooking with Too Hot Tamales (1997) and Mexican Cooking for Dummies (1999/2002).

Milliken is also a seasoned TV personality, starring with Feniger in 396 episodes of Too Hot Tamales and Tamales World Tour on the Food Network in the 1990s. Prior to the shows on the Food Network, in 1993 Milliken and Feniger appeared with Julia Child in her PBS series Cooking With Master Chefs. Milliken also prepared with Feniger the food that was served in the 2001 movie, Tortilla Soup.

Milliken and Feniger were a team of sixteen chefs on the Julia Child series, Cooking With Master Chefs, in 1993.

Most recently, Milliken appeared on the third season of Top Chef Masters that aired in 2011. She was the first runner-up and won $40,000 for her charity, Share Our Strength.

=== Awards ===
She was the co-recipient of the 2018 Julia Child Award from The Julia Child Foundation for Gastronomy and the Culinary Arts.

== Personal life ==
She lives in Los Angeles with her husband, Josh Schweitzer, and their two sons. Josh Schweitzer was previously married to Milliken's business partner Susan Feniger. Milliken serves on the Board of Directors of Share Our Strength.
