= Blackening (cooking) =

Method to form a crust of herbs and spices

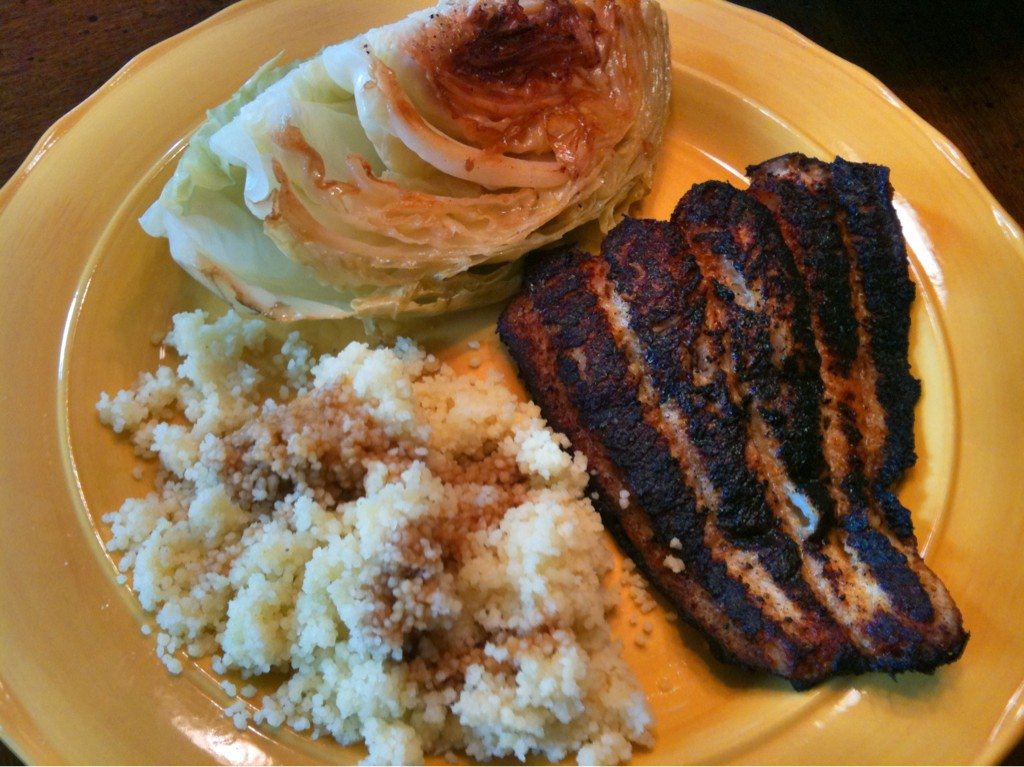
Blackened fish (right)

Blackening is a cooking technique used in the preparation of fish and other foods. Often associated with Cajun cuisine, this technique was invented and popularized by chef Paul Prudhomme. The food is dipped in melted butter and then sprinkled with a mixture of herbs and spices, usually some combination of thyme, oregano, chili pepper, peppercorns, salt, garlic powder, and onion powder. It is then cooked in a very hot cast-iron skillet. The characteristic brown-black color of the crust results from a combination of browned milk solids from the butter and charred spices.

While the original recipe calls for redfish (Red drum), the same method of preparation can be applied to other types of fish as well as proteins such as steak, chicken cutlets, or tofu.

== See also ==
- Browning (cooking)
