= Susan Feniger =

American chef

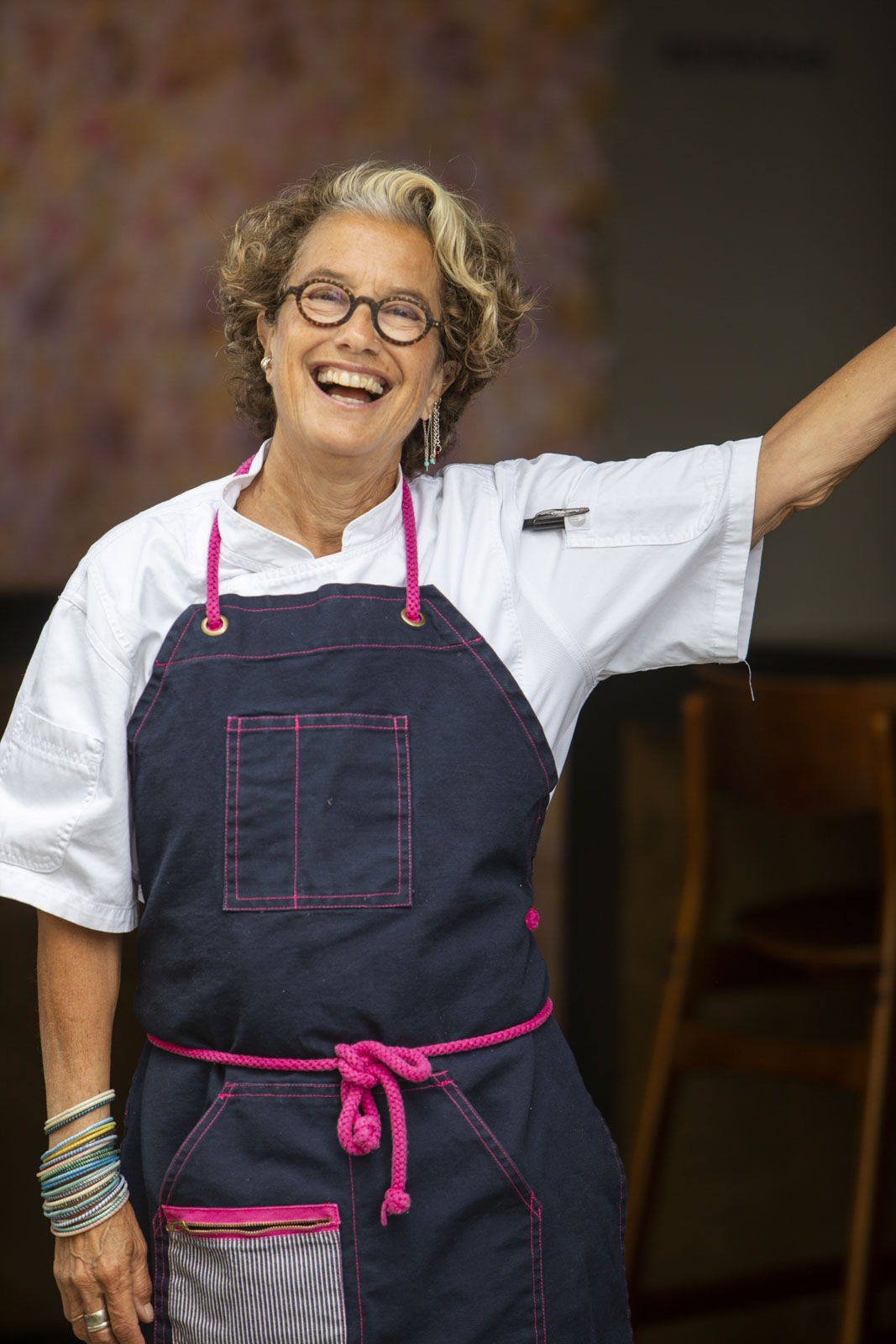
- Susan Feniger at her Santa Monica restaurant SOCALO. Photo by Anne Fishbein.
- Born: Toledo, Ohio
- Occupations: Chef, restaurateur, author
- Known for: Too Hot Tamales, SOCALO, Border Grill, CITY
- Relatives: Ben Feldman (nephew)
- Website: https://www.socalo.com https://www.aliceb.com

Susan Feniger is an American chef, restaurateur, cookbook author, and radio and TV personality. She is known for starring in the cooking show Too Hot Tamales on the Food Network and opening several influential restaurants in Los Angeles. She has been awarded a Lifetime Achievement Award by the California Restaurant Association.

== Early life and education ==
Feniger is from Toledo, Ohio, and is the daughter of Ruth Alice and Yale Feniger. She was raised in a Jewish home. Feniger graduated from Pitzer College in 1976.

== Career ==
=== Restaurants ===
After working together in Chicago and Paris, Feniger and her longtime collaborator, Mary Sue Milliken, settled in Los Angeles where they founded City Cafe in 1981. They eventually expanded to a larger space on La Brea Blvd. and renamed the establishment City Restaurant. In 1985, they opened the Mexican restaurant Border Grill in the original City Cafe space, before moving it to Santa Monica in 1990. The restaurant later expanded to Pasadena (closed) and the Mandalay Bay Resort in Las Vegas. Broadening their culinary horizons Feniger and her partner opened the Latin flavor restaurant Ciudad (now a Border Grill) in Los Angeles in 1998. The success of the three restaurants led Feniger and Milliken to be recognized for changing Los Angeles's culinary landscape. Feniger has been influenced by the food and culture of various nations, such as India, France, and Mexico.

In April 2009, Feniger opened her first solo project: Street, a multi-ethnic eatery of "street food" in Hollywood. Sample dishes included millet puffs, paani puri, Massaman chicken curry, dumplings, Egyptian-style baked fish and peanut butter cookies for dessert. Street closed in November 2013.

In December 2013, Feniger, with Executive Chef and Partner Kajsa Alger, opened Mud Hen Tavern at the former location of Street. A neighborhood bar and restaurant, it offered seasonal, gourmet pub and comfort food in a warm and relaxed setting. The bar team in partnership with mixology consultant Tricia Carr (formerly Alley), curated a beverage program that offered a vibrant and accessible selection of international wines, local craft beers and artisanal cocktails to complement Mud Hen Tavern's cuisine. Mud Hen Tavern closed on October 11, 2016.

In December 2019, Feniger and Milliken opened the Mexican restaurant Socalo in Santa Monica. The name is derived from the words "SoCal" and zócalo, or “town square” in Spanish.

In December 2023, Feniger and Milliken opened the restaurant Alice B. in Palm Springs, which has a focus on seasonal bounty, French, and Mediterranean influences. The restaurant is named after Alice B. Toklas, partner of Gertrude Stein, and is part of Living Out, a luxury apartment complex for LGBTQIA+ adults.

=== Publishing, television, and film ===
In collaboration with Milliken and others, Feniger has published five cookbooks: City Cuisine (1989), Mesa Mexicana (1994), Cantina: The Best of Casual Mexican Cooking (Casual Cuisines of the World) (1996), Cooking with Too Hot Tamales (1997) and Mexican Cooking for Dummies (1999/2002).

Feniger is also a TV personality, starring with Milliken in 396 episodes of the popular Too Hot Tamales and Tamales World Tour on the Food Network in the 1990s. Prior to the shows on the Food Network, in 1993 Feniger and Milliken appeared with Julia Child in her PBS series Cooking with Master Chefs. Feniger has also appeared on Sabrina, the Teenage Witch and prepared with Milliken the food that was served in the 2001 movie, Tortilla Soup.

Most recently, Feniger appeared on the second season of Top Chef Masters that aired in 2010. She was the last female chef in the competition, eliminated following a challenge to create a dish fit for the gods. Feniger's creation for Aphrodite was Kaya toast served with a soy-glazed egg and coconut jam. She raised $32,500 for The Scleroderma Research Foundation. "It's an honor to be on that show and have Schleroderma [sic] Research Foundation out there in the public eye," she said in an interview with SlashFood. "I've gotten so many email messages and Facebook messages from all over the country. So for me, I'm totally the winner in this."

In 2011, ABC bought the rights to develop a sitcom based on the lives of Feniger and Milliken, but it never aired.

In April 2013, she appeared as herself in the Bones episode "The Maiden in the Mushrooms".

In October 2014, Feniger appeared as a contestant in the "Superstar Sabotage" tournament of Cutthroat Kitchen. She also appeared as a guest judge in Episode 15 of Hell's Kitchen (Season 19) which was aired in April 2021.

== Awards and honors ==
The Smithsonian's National Museum of American History houses small dishes from Feniger and Milliken's City Café in Los Angeles, California, their first restaurant that opened in 1981. In 2013, Feniger was awarded the Elizabeth Burns Lifetime Achievement Award by the California Restaurant Association. She was the co-recipient of the 2018 Julia Child Award from The Julia Child Foundation for Gastronomy and the Culinary Arts.

== Personal life ==
Feniger was a founding board member of the Scleroderma Research Foundation and has served on the organization's board since 1988.

Feniger serves on the board of the Los Angeles LGBT Center. She is a lesbian and her partner is Liz Lachman. Feniger's ex-husband, Josh Schweitzer, is married to her business partner Mary Sue Milliken.

Her nephew is actor Ben Feldman, who is the step-son of her sister.
