= Grace Young (author) =

Chef and Cookbook Author

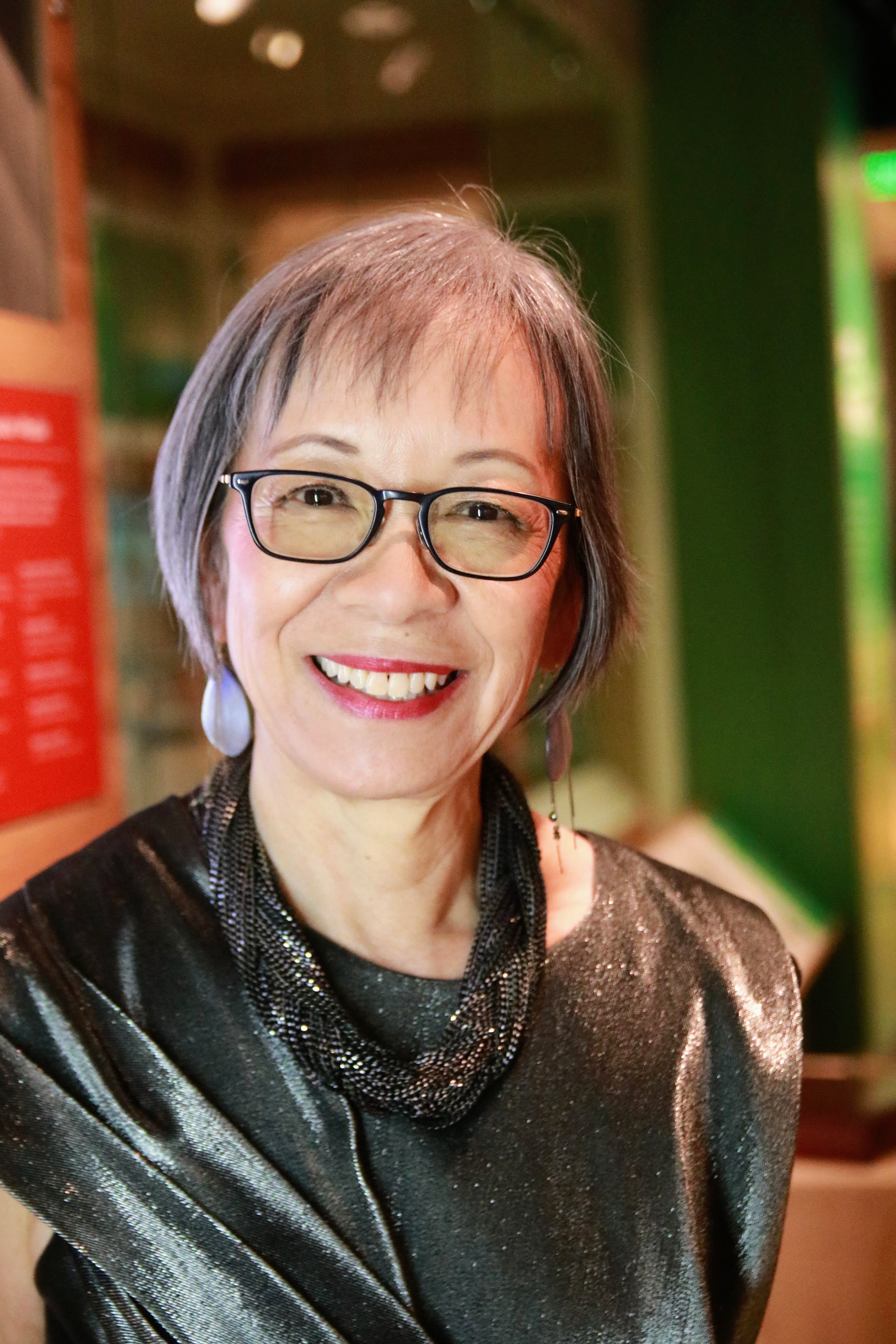
- Grace Young at the Smithsonian National Museum of American History in 2022
- Awards: Julia Child Award, James Beard Foundation Award

Grace Young is an American cookbook author, activist, and food historian specializing in Chinese cuisine and wok cookery. She received the Julia Child Award from The Julia Child Foundation for Gastronomy and the Culinary Arts and James Beard Humanitarian of the Year award from the James Beard Foundation, both in 2022, for her culinary achievements.

Young has authored cookbooks focused on American Chinese cuisine with her books The Wisdom of the Chinese Kitchen and The Breath of a Wok being influential in highlighting the use of the Chinese wok to a new generation of cooks. Both books have won the Best International Cookbook Award from the International Association of Culinary Professionals.

As an activist, Young began advocating for greater patronage of New York City's Chinatown during the COVID-19 pandemic. In March 2020, she interviewed several Chinatown business and restaurant owners as part of the Coronavirus: Chinatown Stories video series and, in 2021, launched the Grace Young Support Chinatown Fund, raising $40,000 for four Chinatown businesses.

== Early life and career ==
Young grew up in San Francisco, California, in what she describes as a "traditional Cantonese family", eating only Cantonese food. As a young girl, Young watched Julia Child's show The French Chef and recreated recipes from the show. She credits Julia Child as one of her inspirations saying, "I wanted to do for Chinese cooking what Julia Child had done for French cooking." In high school, Young worked as a kitchen assistant at a cooking school and interned at a Dole Pineapple test kitchen in San Francisco. During college, she worked at the General Foods test kitchen for 3 years.

After college, she worked for between 15 and 20 years at Time Life Books as their test kitchen director and director of food photography for more than 40 cookbooks. In her 30s, Young learned traditional Cantonese recipes from her parents, compiling them in The Wisdom of the Chinese Kitchen, her first cookbook, published in 1999. The book earned the IACP Best International Cookbook Award, was a James Beard Foundation International Cookbook Award Finalist, and was nominated for the IACP Julia Child First Cookbook Award. In 2004, Young published her second cookbook, The Breath of a Wok, containing 125 wok recipes. It earned a 2019 Culinary Classics Award and the Jane Grigson Award for distinguished scholarship. In 2006, Young began working on her next cookbook, Stir-Frying to the Sky’s Edge, which discussed stir-frying's benefits, uses, and origin. The book was published 4 years later and earned the 2011 James Beard Foundation Award for International Cooking.

Young has also been recognized for her culinary videos. In 2016, she released "Chinese Trinidadian Chicken with Mango Chutney", a video of her cooking the dish, which subsequently won the IACP Digital Media Single Food-Focused Video Award in 2017. Also, in 2017, she released a video "The Breath of Wok Video" depicting the structure and uses of a wok. The video was a finalist for the 2019 James Beard Video Webcast Award. Also, in 2019, she posted "Wok Therapist", a comedic video about the wok cooking advice she provides others. The video earned the 2020 James Beard Digital Award and was a finalist for the Webby Award.

Other than making cookbooks and culinary videos, Young's career also includes serving 6 years on the James Beard Foundation's Book Awards Committee (2004–2010), 9 years as a contributing editor for Saveur magazine (2006–2015), and serving as the Test Kitchen Director for the U.C. Berkeley Wellness Cooking School. Young also has an online cooking course in which over 12,000 students have participated in.

== Activism ==
During the COVID-19 pandemic, Young advocated for the preservation of historic Chinatowns throughout the United States as well as bringing awareness to violence against Asian Americans. In 2020, when New York City Mayor Bill De Blasio was considering a city-wide lockdown, she worked with filmmaker Dan Ahn documenting the pandemic's effect on Chinatown in New York City's Manhattan in a project called "Coronavirus: Chinatown Stories." The video series was nominated for an IACP digital media award and played at the Smithsonian National Museum of American History.

Young also significantly collaborated with the James Beard Foundation. She partnered with the organization on the #savechineserestaurants Instagram campaign in 2020, and later also with Poster House museum to fight anti-Asian sentiment via the #LoveAAPI campaign.

In 2021, she launched the Grace Young Support Chinatown Fund with the New York non-profit Welcome to Chinatown, raising $40,000. The funds went to established legacy Chinatown restaurants Hop Lee, Hop Kee, Wo Hop Upstairs, and Wo Hop Downstairs to provide meals for those suffering from food insecurity. She said she is donating the $50,000 Julia Child Award prize to non-profit organizations that support Chinatowns across the United States.

In April 2021, she worked with Asian Americans For Equality (AAFE) to raise $25,000 to fund 7,000 personal security alarms for Asian Americans and Pacific Islanders.

== Museum contributions ==
Grace Young donated her family's Canton Rose porcelain dinnerware (circa 1939) and wok (circa 1949) to the Smithsonian National Museum of American History, thus contributing to the preservation of Chinese-American food history. She also donated a copy of The French Chef Cookbook, signed by Julia Child, a copy of The Wisdom of the Chinese Kitchen, and some Julia Child memorabilia to the Smithsonian.

Also, Young has given programs and lectured at many museums, such as the aforementioned Smithsonian Museum, American Museum of Natural History, and Poster House museum. Furthermore, she was a curator at The Breath of a Wok exhibition at New York University’s Asian Pacific American Gallery, in 2004. She currently serves on the Smithsonian National Museum of American History's Kitchen Cabinet, which is the museum's food advisory board.

== Awards ==
The below awards have not been mentioned elsewhere on the page.

- Forbes 50 Over 50 (2023)
- USA Today Women of the Year (2023)
- James Beard Foundation's Humanitarian of the Year (2022)
- Eating Well's American Food Hero (2022)

== Publications ==
- The Wisdom of the Chinese Kitchen: Classic Family Recipes for Celebration and Healing, Simon and Schuster (ISBN 9780684847399, 1999)
- The Breath of a Wok, Simon Schuster (ISBN 9780743238274, 2004)
- Stir-Frying to the Sky's Edge: The Ultimate Guide to Mastery, with Authentic Recipes and Stories (ISBN 9781416580577, 2010)
