= Gordon Elliott =

Gordon Elliott may refer to:

- Gordon Elliott (journalist) (born 1956), British Australian journalist and producer, radio and television personality
- Gordon Elliott (racehorse trainer) (born 1978), Irish racehorse trainer
- Wild Bill Elliott, American actor
