= The $1,000,000 Chance of a Lifetime (Australian game show) =

- Genre: Quiz show
- Created by: Stephen Leahy
- Presented by: Frank Warrick (1999); Sandy Roberts (2000)
- Country of origin: Australia
- Original language: English
- No. of seasons: 2
- No. of episodes: 26

Production
- Running time: 60 minutes (Including commercials)
- Production company: Action Time

Original release
- Network: Seven Network
- Release: 31 May 1999 – 2000

Related
- It's Your Chance of a Lifetime

The $1,000,000 Chance of a Lifetime (stylized as $Million Chance of a Lifetime) is an hour-long prime time quiz show that aired in Australia. It was later adapted for an American audience as It's Your Chance of a Lifetime, so as not to be confused with the American game show that used the title The $1,000,000 Chance of a Lifetime.

== Overview ==
The $1,000,000 Chance of a Lifetime aired on the Seven Network from 1999 to 2000. Seven began production on the show when rival network Nine Network announced production of Who Wants to Be a Millionaire?, which promised the largest cash prize on Australian quiz show history.

Chance of a Lifetime was produced in-house by Seven. It was a knowledge based quiz. The million dollar prize was never won; only smaller amounts of money were awarded to contestants.

== Hosts ==
Frank Warrick first hosted the show in 1999. For the second and last season, Seven personality and sportscaster Sandy Roberts was Warrick's replacement.

== Rules of the game ==
=== Main game ===
A solo player (chosen randomly from the audience) competed for a chance to win over $1,000,000 by answering a series of 10 open-ended questions. The first of these was a "Credit Card Question"; if the player answered correctly, their entire credit card bills were paid off. They kept this payoff regardless of the outcome of the game. An incorrect answer ended the game immediately and sent the player home with no winnings.

Each of the nine remaining questions was drawn from a different category. The second question awarded $10,000 if answered correctly or ended the game for a miss. After giving a correct answer on any question, the player was told the category for the next question and had to decide whether to continue the game, or end it and keep all winnings. If the player chose to continue, they had to risk a part of their total (exclusive of the credit card payoff). The third question required a wager of anything from $1 to $10,000, and each question's wager must always be larger than that of the previous question. If the player answered correctly, the amount of the wager was added to their bank; if they missed, it was deducted and the game ended, with the player keeping whatever was left of their bank.

Categories were chosen at random before each turn and were removed from play after being used once.

The player was given two chances to switch to a question of their favourite category after seeing that of their upcoming question, but before the question itself.

If the player answered all 10 questions correctly, they won all money accumulated during the game, including the credit card payoff.

=== Charity ===
If a contestant cleared the second question (for $10,000), they would also get to select a charity organisation, to which Seven would donate $1,000.

=== Home player ===
The show would induce home viewers to join studio games through two hotlines (later one). Each game would feature a home player, which was picked randomly from all hotline callers of the main contestant's city of choice in Australia.

On each question, the home caller would give an answer before the studio contestant. If the caller answered wrong, they would be eliminated; while a wrong answer from the studio player would eliminate both of them, provided the caller was still live.

Regardless of the outcome, the caller would keep their winnings up to their game's conclusion. The first question was worth $1,000 and each question would be worth $1,000 more than the last (i.e., $2,000 on the second, $3,000 on the third, etc.), for a maximum of $55,000.

== Ratings ==
Chance aired on Monday nights on Seven. Ratings began to slide after the first episode aired. The show ran for two seasons, and was eventually moved to weeknights at 5.30 pm before the nightly news broadcast; it was then Seven began the practice of airing game shows as a lead-in to its news bulletins, which continues to this day. It was eventually cancelled, with weaker ratings and excessive production costs cited as reasons for cancellation.

== International versions ==
Most of the versions were distributed by ITV Studios except for the Australian version.

Country	Name	Host	Network	Date premiered	Prize
Australia (original format)	The $1,000,000 Chance of a Lifetime	Frank Warrick; Sandy Roberts	Seven	1999–2000	A$1,280,000
Czech Republic	Kvíz Show	Vladimír Čech	TV Prima	2004–2005	1,000,000 Kč
Germany	Die Quiz Show	Jörg Pilawa; Christian Clerici; Matthias Opdenhövel	Sat.1	2000–2004	DM 512,000 €256,000
Hungary	Multimilliomos – Most vagy soha!	Gabriella Jakupcsek	TV2	2000–2005	51,200,000 Ft.
India	Jeeto Chappar Phaad Ke	Govinda	SET	2001–2002	₹20,000,000
Indonesia	Chance of a Lifetime	Dede Yusuf	SCTV	2004	Rp.1,536,000,000
Italy	Quiz Show	Amadeus	Rai Uno	2000–2002	£it.512,000,000 €256,000
Lebanon	لمين الملايين؟ Lamin El malayin?	Serge Zarqa	MTV	2001–2002	£L100,000,000
Lebanon	لمين الملايين جونيور; Lamin El malayin Junior	Karol Sakr	MTV	2002	£L100,000,000
Poland	Życiowa szansa	Krzysztof Ibisz	Polsat	2000–2002	PLN 1,000,000
Portugal	Dinheiro à Vista	Luísa Castel-Branco	TVI	2000	30,000,000$00
Slovakia	SuperKvíz	Peter Kočiš (2004); Ján Gordulič (2005)	Jednotka	2004	1,000,000 Sk.
Slovakia	SuperKvíz Junior	Peter Kočiš (2004); Ján Gordulič (2005)	Jednotka	2004–2005	1,000,000 Sk.
Slovenia	Življenjska priložnost	Mito Trefalt; Borut Veselko	Kanal A	2000–2002	1,000,000 SIT
Turkey	Fırsat Bu Fırsat	Cem Davran	Kanal D	2000–2001	TL512,000,000
Turkey	Maksimum Risk	Haluk Bilginer	Kanal D	2002	TL512,000,000
United States	It's Your Chance of a Lifetime	Gordon Elliott	FOX	2000	$1,290,000

Versions have also aired in Norway, France, Israel and other countries.

== See also ==
- List of Australian television series
