= The Tonk BBQ =

The Tonk
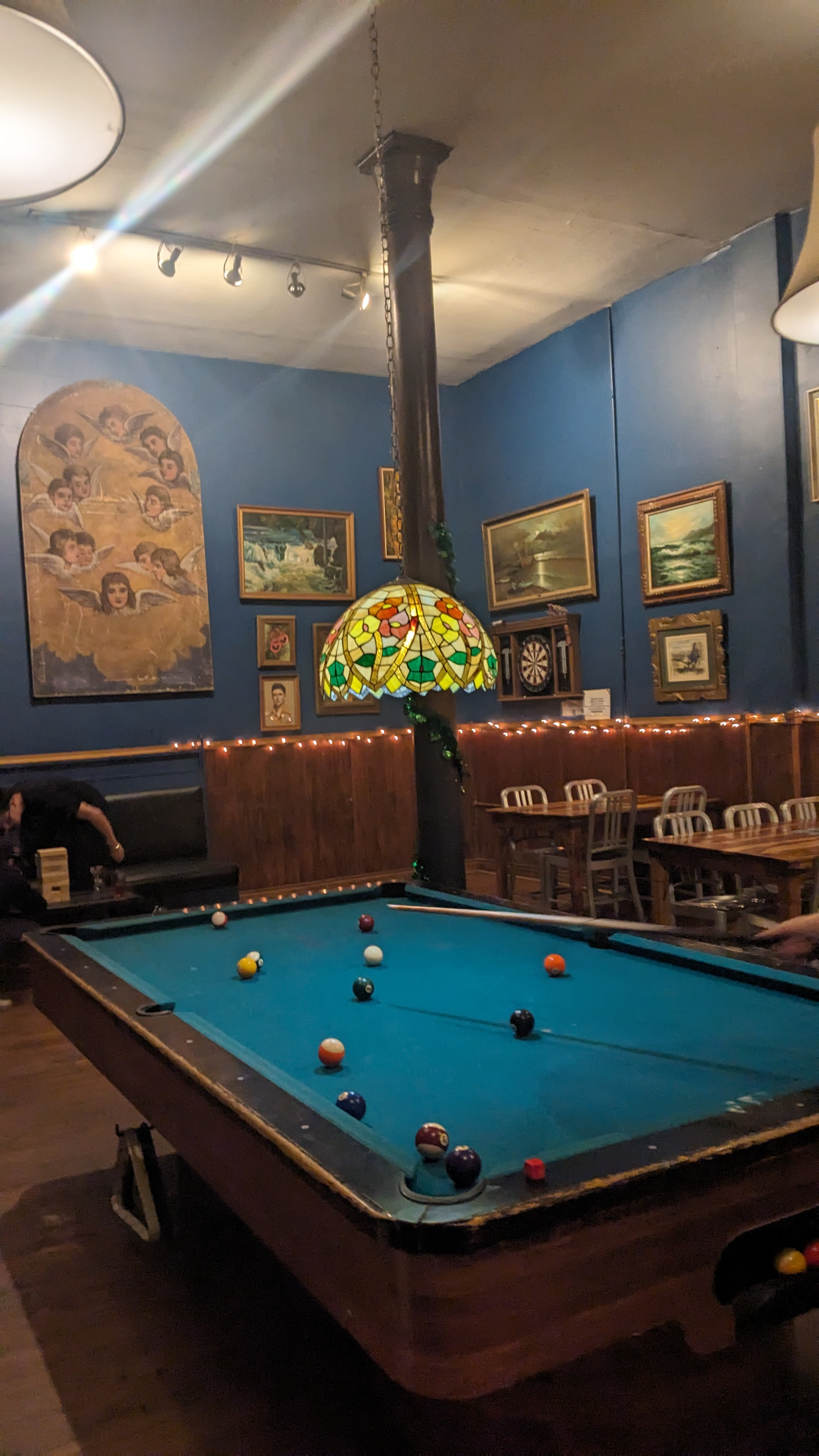

Restaurant information
- Established: 2007
- Owner: Willie Wagner
- Location: 1800 S Racine Ave, Chicago, Illinois, United States
- Website: https://thetonkchicago.com

The Tonk is a barbecue restaurant located in the Pilsen neighborhood of Chicago, Illinois. The establishment is known for serving Memphis-style barbecue and for hosting live music events.

== History ==
The Tonk was founded in 2007 by Willie Wagner. The restaurant has been recognized for its approach to barbecue and has participated in music-related events since its opening.

== Menu ==
The restaurant's menu includes a selection of smoked meats such as brisket, ribs, and pulled pork, as well as a variety of side dishes.

== Music and Events ==
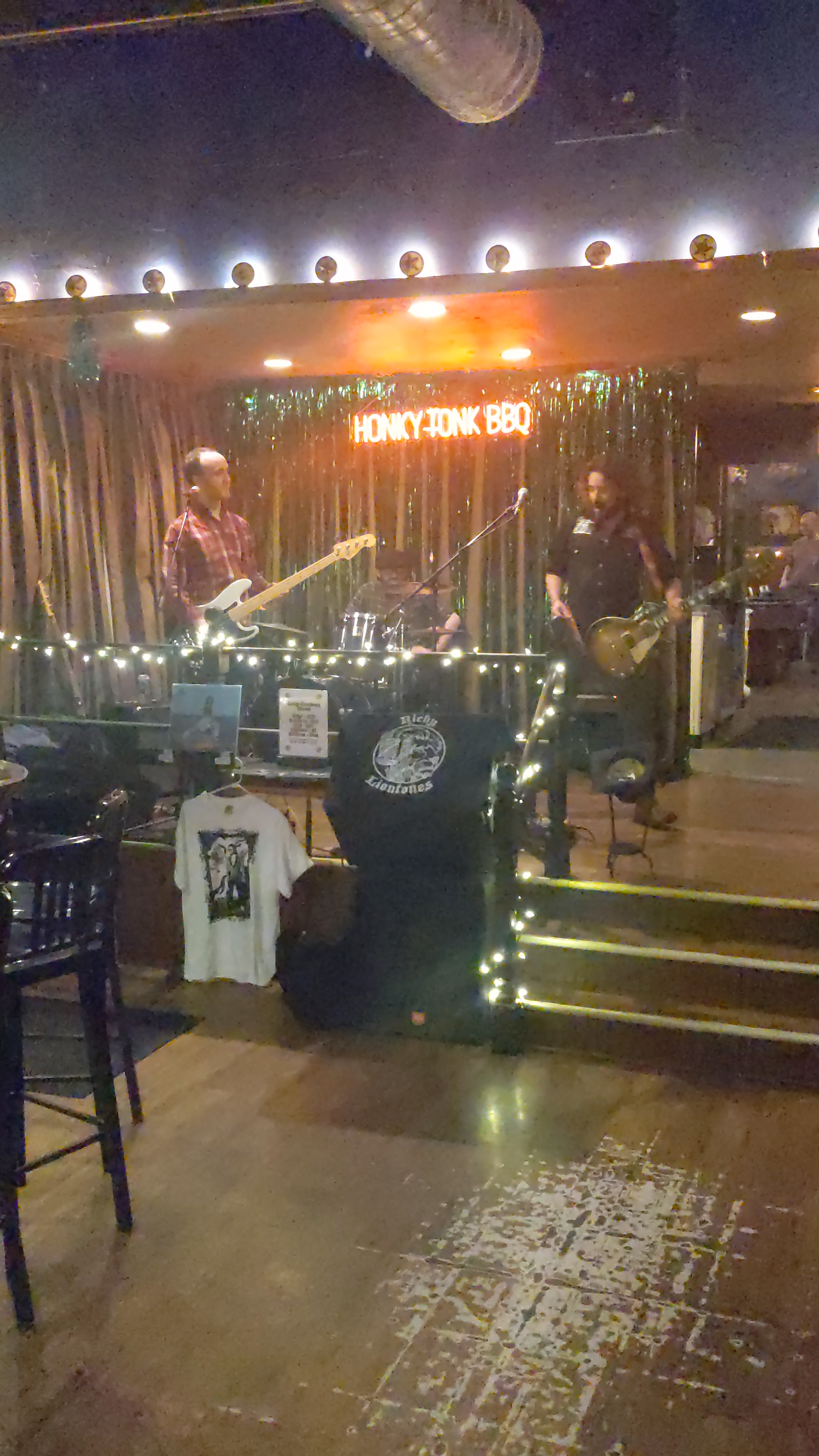
Ricky Liontones plays on 3-8-2024

The Tonk hosts live music events, featuring various genres such as jazz, blues, country, and rockabilly. The restaurant has been noted as a venue for local and touring musicians. It has contributed to the local music scene by providing a platform for artists to perform.

== Performances ==
Over the years, The Tonk has hosted performances by a variety of notable musicians and bands, contributing to its reputation as a key music venue in Chicago. Some of the artists who have appeared on its stage include:

- John Doe and the Bluegrass Bandits – Known for their energetic performances, they played a memorable show in July 2018 that was highlighted in Chicago Music Magazine.
- The Delta Blues Experience – This acclaimed blues ensemble performed a series of shows in 2019, drawing attention from The Chicago Tribune for their deep roots in traditional blues.
- Ella Fitzgerald Tribute Band – In 2020, this tribute band captivated audiences with renditions of Fitzgerald's classics, earning a feature in Time Out Chicago.
