= Not My Mama's Meals =

- Created by: Bobby Deen
- Starring: Bobby Deen, Paula Deen
- Country of origin: United States
- No. of episodes: 34

Production
- Running time: 30 minutes

Original release
- Network: Cooking Channel
- Release: January 4, 2012 – November 27, 2013

Not My Mama's Meals is a Cooking Channel series hosted by Bobby Deen, which debuted on January 4, 2012. In the series, Bobby Deen takes inspiration from his mother Paula Deen's recipes, reworking them into healthier versions reducing fat and calorie content. Clips from Paula Deen's various Food Network series are commonly shown with limited nutritional information to contrast with that of Bobby Deen's preparation, which is filmed on location at his New York City apartment. Paula Deen appears on the show as well, typically from her Savannah home, trying samples of her son's reworked dishes.

== Episodes ==
Not My Mama's Meals has aired 4 seasons:

- Season 1: 10 Episodes (January 4, 2012 to March 14, 2012)
- Season 2: 14 Episodes (August 15, 2012 to December 5, 2012)
- Season 3: 13 Episodes (January 2, 2013 to April 3, 2013)
- Season 4: 13 Episodes (August 21, 2013 to November 27, 2013)

No.	Title	Original air date
1	"Just Desserts"	January 4, 2012
2	"The Bag Lady's Son"	January 11, 2012
3	"Can't Take the South Out of the Man"	January 18, 2012
4	"Game Day Eats"	January 25, 2012
5	"Eating Clean"	February 1, 2012
6	"Diner Delight"	February 15, 2012
7	"Sweet & Savory"	February 22, 2012
8	"Super Southern"	February 29, 2012
9	"Manly Meals Made Light"	March 7, 2012
10	"Restaurant Reunion"	March 14, 2012
11	"Boys' Night"	August 15, 2012
12	"Romantic Dinner 101"	August 22, 2012
13	"Italian Done Right"	August 29, 2012
14	"Say Cheese"	September 5, 2012
15	"Mexican Made Healthy"	September 12, 2012
16	"Good Morning Sunshine!"	September 19, 2012
17	"Comfort Foods"	September 26, 2012
18	"Southern to the Core"	October 3, 2012
19	"Cajun Style!"	October 10, 2012
20	"Smoke 'Em If You Got 'Em"	October 17, 2012
21	"New York, New York"	October 24, 2012
22	"Meat & Potatoes"	October 31, 2012
23	"Holiday with Mama"	December 5, 2012
24	"A Little South in Your Mouth"	January 2, 2013
25	"Quick and Easy"	January 9, 2013
26	"Party Favorites"	January 16, 2013
28	"Junk-Less Food"	January 23, 2013
27	"It's Brunch Time"	January 30, 2013
28	"Taste of the Mediterranean"	February 13, 2013
29	"Farm to Table"	February 20, 2013
30	"Light! Fresh!"	February 27, 2013
31	"Asian Take-Out"	March 6, 2013
32	"Oui, Oui"	March 13, 2013
33	"Hearty Favorites"	March 20, 2013
34	"Dessert Crazy"	March 27, 2013
34	"Fresh Catch of the Day"	April 3, 2013
