= Vergos =

Vergos is a surname. Notable people with the surname include:

- Charlie Vergos (1925–2010), American restaurateur
- Dimitrios Vergos (1886–1956), Greek champion in wrestling, weightlifting, and shot put
- Nikos Vergos (born 1996), Greek footballer
