= Gordon Elliott (journalist) =

Australian journalist and producer (born 1956)

- Born: 30 September 1956 (age 69); Everton, Liverpool, UK
- Education: University of Sydney
- Occupations: Journalist; reporter; TV personality; radio personality; producer
- Notable credits: Good Morning Australia; A Current Affair; The Gordon Elliott Show; Door Knock Dinners

Gordon Elliott (born 30 September 1956) is a British-born Australian journalist and producer, radio and television personality and producer, based now in the United States.

Elliott was the executive producer of ABC's former daytime cooking-related talk show The Chew, and he had his own eponymous TV talk show program between 1994 and 1997, The Gordon Elliott Show, as well as Door Knock Dinners.

== Early life and early career ==
Elliott was born in Everton, Liverpool, England, but grew up in Lewisham, New South Wales, Australia. He was educated at Christian Brothers' High School, Lewisham. While studying as a Sydney student, Elliott worked part-time on a radio show and ended up on Good Morning Australia. He also appeared as the Australian anchorman for the 1984 Olympic Concert Gala. The gala marked his third trip to Los Angeles, as he had earlier flown to Los Angeles to fill in as host of American Top 40 first in 1979 and again in 1980. At the time of his first AT40 appearance, which introduced him to American audiences, he was the youngest substitute host in the program's history.

After several jobs hosting morning news programs and landing work as the feature reporter on the Fox Television show A Current Affair (produced by New York's WNYW) in 1987, Elliott appeared as the house-entering feature reporter on WNYW's morning news program Good Day New York.

== Mid-1990s to present ==
The 1990s had him take turns hosting game and talk shows, including The Gordon Elliott Show from 1994 to 1997. In 1990, Elliott also hosted To Tell the Truth for two months before being replaced by Lynn Swann. In 1991 he was the presenter for the Australian TV show, Hard Copy. In 2000, he hosted It's Your Chance of a Lifetime.

Recently, he has hosted the TV Food Network's programs Door Knock Dinners, Follow That Food, and the Fine Living network's The Genuine Article, and was the TV pitchman for Campbell's Soup in the early 2000s. He had a recurring role on Oz as the host of a game show that was popular with the inmates. He formed his own production company, Follow Productions, in 1999. This company produces Paula Deen's Home Cooking, Paula's Best Dishes, and Paula's Party for Food Network. In 2007, he won a daytime Emmy for Best Lifestyle Series for his work on Paula Deen's Home Cooking.

His company has produced many other lifestyle series for cable networks, including Simply Wine with Andrea Immer, Pairings with Andrea, Best For Less, the first four seasons of Sandra Lee's Semi Home Made, We Live Here, and Pocket The Difference, and Pati Jinich's "Pati's Mexican Table" beginning with season three. He is executive producer of both Food Network shows hosted by Pat and Gina Neely: Down Home with the Neelys and Road Tasted with the Neelys.

In 2010, he began producing Spice & Easy for Food Network. He was also the executive producer and off-screen announcer for the lifestyle show The Chew, which aired from 2011 to 2018 as a part of ABC's daytime lineup.

== Filmography ==
- Casey Kasem's American Top 40 (substitute host, 9/8/1979 & 9/6/1980)
- Good Morning Australia (breakfast TV) (1981–1987)
- A Current Affair (1987–1991)
- To Tell the Truth (1990)
- Hard Copy/Hard Copy Australian Edition (1991)
- Good Day New York
- CBS This Morning (1993)
- Ryori no tetsujin ("Iron Chef") (1993) (in the 2000 special "New York Battle")
- The Gordon Elliott Show (talk show) (1994–1997)
- World's Dumbest Criminals (1997)
- Rencontre à New York (1998)
- Trifling With Fate (2000)
- It's Your Chance of a Lifetime (2000)
- Oz (2001)
- Follow That Food (2002)
- The Genuine Article (2004)
- The Next Food Network Star (2005)
- Gordon Elliott's Door Knock Dinners

Preceded by Robin Ward in 1980	Host of To Tell the Truth; 1990	Succeeded by Lynn Swann
