= Memphis-style barbecue =

Regional style of food preparation in the United States

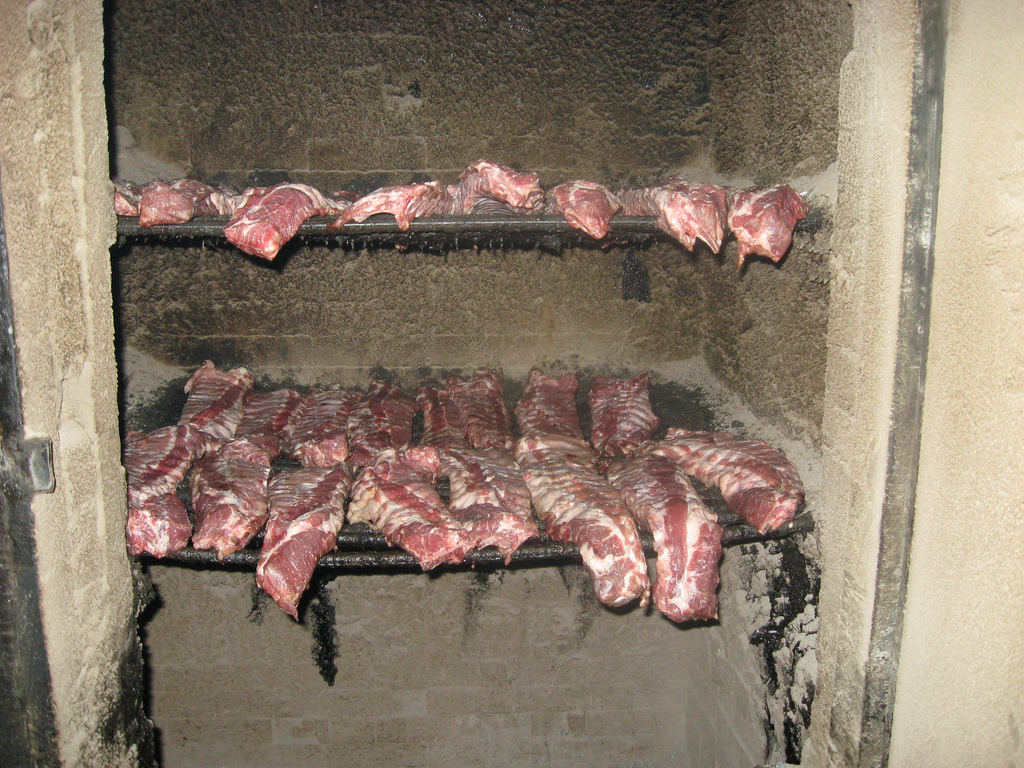
Dry ribs slow cooking in a pit at Leonard's BBQ

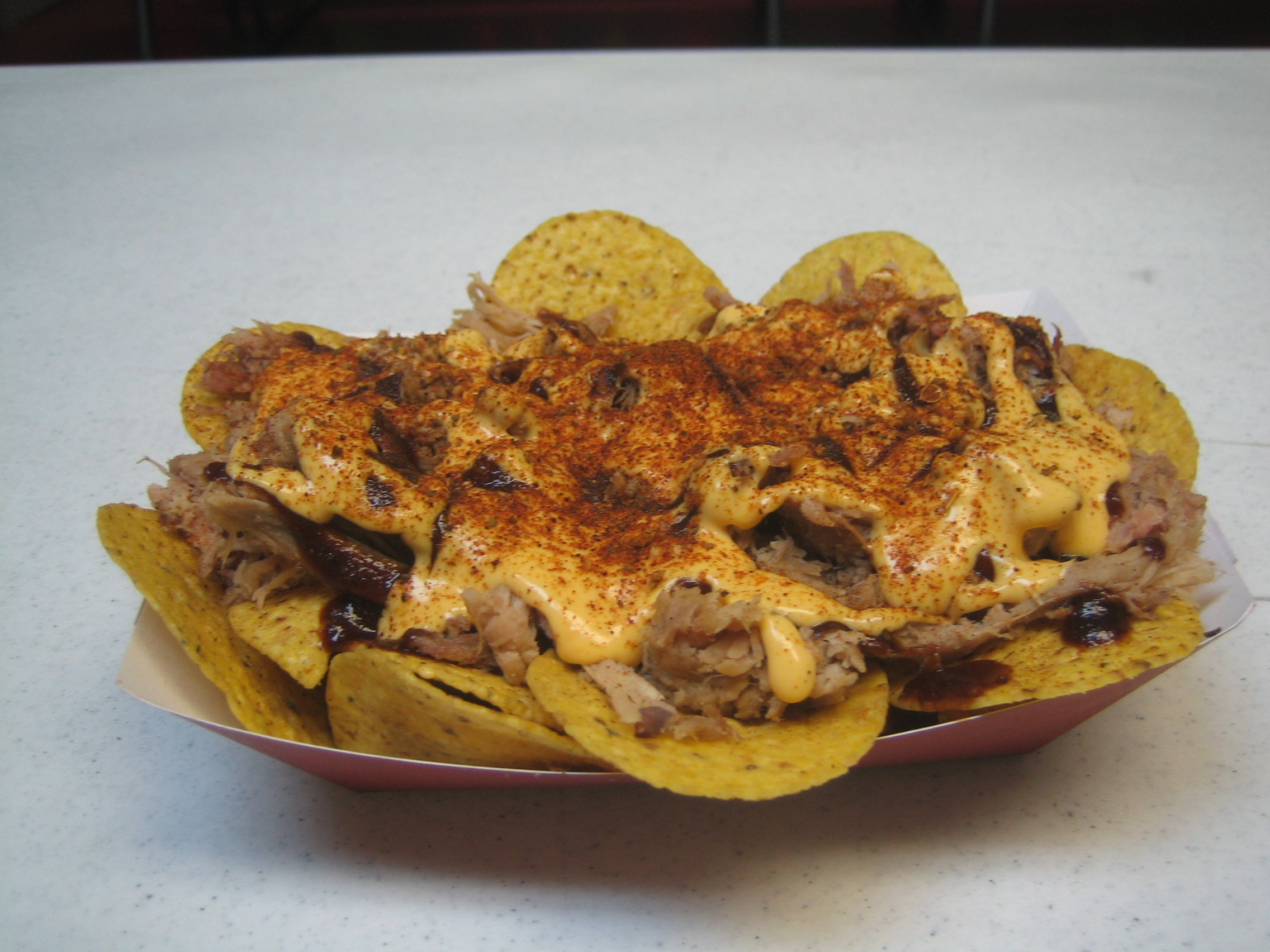
Pulled pork nachos

Memphis-style barbecue is one of the four predominant regional styles of barbecue in the United States, the other three being Carolina, Kansas City, and Texas. Like many southern varieties of barbecue, Memphis-style barbecue is mostly made using pork, usually ribs and shoulders, though many restaurants will still serve beef and chicken.

Memphis-style barbecue is slow cooked in a pit and ribs can be prepared either "dry" or "wet". "Dry" ribs are covered with a dry rub consisting of salt and various spices before cooking and are normally eaten without sauce. "Wet" ribs are brushed with sauce before, during, and after cooking.

Memphis-style barbecue has become well known due to the World Championship Barbecue Cooking Contest held each May, which has been listed in Guinness World Records as the largest pork barbecue contest in the world. The event is regularly covered by national and international television networks such as The Food Network and the BBC and attracts over 100,000 visitors. Many of Memphis' barbecue restaurants have become nationally known and can ship their products anywhere in the country overnight due to the proximity of FedEx's Memphis Superhub.

== History ==
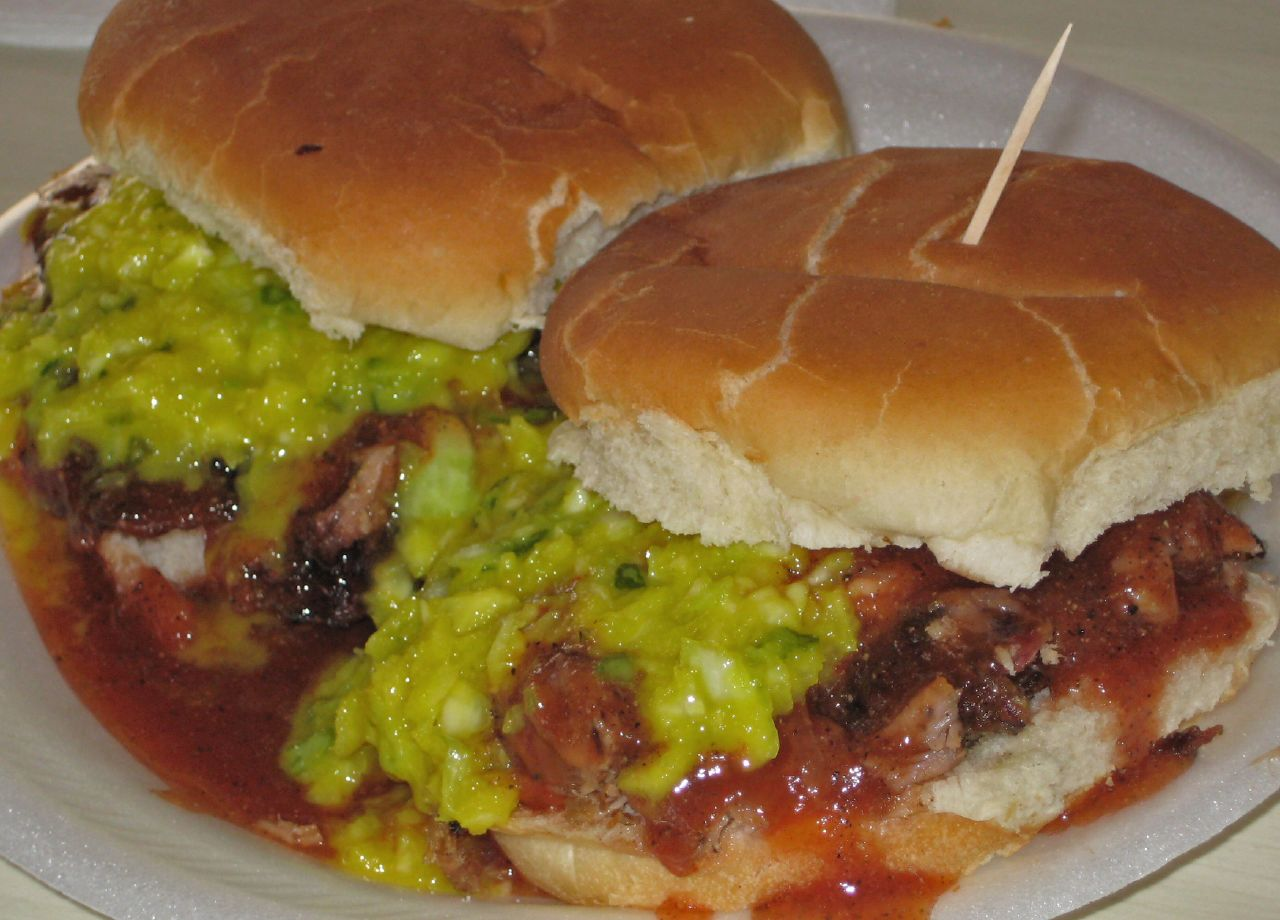
Pork sandwiches at Payne's

After World War II, barbecue became a viable commercial venture in Memphis. Small restaurants, known as "joints", began to open with a purpose-built pit for slow-cooking the meat.

Many small neighborhood joints in low-income areas, such as Payne's, Leonard's and Interstate, have gained notoriety as they reflect the roots of Memphis barbecue. Many regional chains also developed from Memphis, including Tops, Neely's, and Corky's.

As Memphis-style barbecue became more popular across the country, restaurants such as Corky's and The Rendezvous began shipping orders overnight to customers.

== Notable establishments ==
=== Jim Neely's Interstate Bar-B-Que ===
Interstate Bar-B-Que was founded in 1978 by Jim Neely in a rundown grocery store in the low-income neighborhood of South Memphis. Though never a restaurateur, Neely learned how to slow cook ribs in a pit and created a secret sauce based on various local family recipes.

Interstate rose to prominence as one of the premier barbecue restaurants in the city, and was featured nationally on The Food Network and The Travel Channel. Neely's brother and sister-in-law operate another location in Gardena, California. Interstate has been voted the #2 barbecue restaurant in America by People magazine.

=== Neely's ===
Jim Neely's four nephews, brothers Gaelin, Tony, Mark and Patrick, founded Neely's BBQ in Downtown Memphis in 1988, though it operates as a separate business from the other Neely's and does not carry the Interstate name. In 2008, Pat Neely and his wife Gina debuted a cooking show on The Food Network called Down Home with the Neelys, which is highly rated on the network. The couple has also released a cookbook eponymous with their first show. In 2012, the Neelys permanently closed their Memphis-area restaurants.

=== Charlie Vergos' Rendezvous ===
Rendezvous was founded by Charlie Vergos in 1948 in a back alley of Downtown Memphis. Originally the basement of his diner, Vergos discovered a coal chute and turned it into a barbecue pit. Eventually, Vergos converted his diner to a barbecue restaurant and moved the entrance from the street to the alley.

Rendezvous is one of the older and more storied barbecue joints in Memphis due to its many decades of operation and "hole-in-the-wall" atmosphere. The Memphis City Council voted to name the alley where Rendezvous is located "Charlie Vergos' Rendezvous Alley", though the address remains 52 South 2nd Street.

One of Rendezvous' signature dishes is a barbecue shrimp skillet which must be ordered a full day in advance.

=== Central BBQ ===
Central BBQ is a barbecue restaurant chain founded in Memphis, Tennessee, in 2002 by Craig Blondis and Roger Sapp. The restaurant is known for Memphis-style barbecue, particularly dry-rub ribs, pulled pork, smoked chicken wings, and barbecue nachos. Originally opened on Central Avenue, it has become one of the city’s best-known barbecue establishments and has expanded to multiple locations in Tennessee and neighboring states.

== See also ==
- Barbecue spaghetti
- List of regional dishes of the United States
