= Paula's Best Dishes =

- Logo
- Starring: Paula Deen
- Country of origin: United States
- No. of seasons: 3
- No. of episodes: 40 (list of episodes)

Production
- Running time: 30 minutes

Original release
- Network: Food Network
- Release: June 8, 2008 – June 21, 2013

Paula's Best Dishes is an American cooking show hosted by Paula Deen on Food Network

On June 21, 2013, the Food Network announced that they would not renew Deen's contract, due to controversy surrounding her use of a racial slur and racist jokes in her restaurant, effectively cancelling the series.

== Background ==
Debuting on June 8, 2008, the show stars Paula Deen as she helps rescue viewer recipes, prepares dishes, and shares stories.
