= Nikki Dinki =

American chef and cookbook author

- Born: May 11, 1983 (age 43); Clarence, New York, U.S.
- Spouse: Evan Siegert (m. 2010)
- Children: 1
- Culinary career
- Cooking style: Semi-vegetarian
- Television show: Junk Food Flip
- Website: www.nikkidinkicooking.com

Nikki Dinki (born May 11, 1983) is an American chef and cookbook author. She came to prominence as a contestant on the ninth season of the Food Network series Food Network Star, and served as co-host of the Cooking Channel series Junk Food Flip, which aired from 2014 to 2016.

== Biography ==
Dinki was born in Clarence, New York. She attended Clarence High School and graduated in 2001.

In 2006, Dinki appeared in The Sopranos sixth-season episode "Johnny Cakes" as A.J. Soprano's girlfriend Bibi.

In May 2013, it was announced that Dinki had been selected as a contestant on the ninth season of the Food Network series Food Network Star. During the course of the series, she emphasized her semi-vegetarian lifestyle, which she often referred to as her "meat-on-the-side" ideology. Dinki was eliminated from the show on July 28, 2013, finishing in fifth place.

In August 2014, Dinki filmed a pilot for a potential series for Cooking Channel called Junk Food Flip. In April 2015, it was announced that the pilot would be picked up for a full series; and that fellow chef Bobby Deen would serve as co-host. The series officially premiered on June 2, 2015.

Dinki's husband, Evan, is a lawyer; they married in 2010. When she returned to Food Network Star for the ninth-season finale, she announced that she was pregnant with a girl; however, she later suffered a stillbirth at 40 weeks. Her daughter was named Willa, and Dinki created a recipe called Willa's Lemonade Cheesecakes in her honor.

In January 2016, it was reported that Dinki was pregnant with her second child, who was due to be born in April 2016. In March 2016, she announced that the child would be a girl. Dinki announced the arrival of her daughter, Ivy, in May 2016.

== Books ==
- Meat on the Side: Delicious Vegetable-Focused Recipes for Every Day (ISBN 9781250067166) (St. Martin's Press).
