= Hot Brown =

Open-faced sandwich

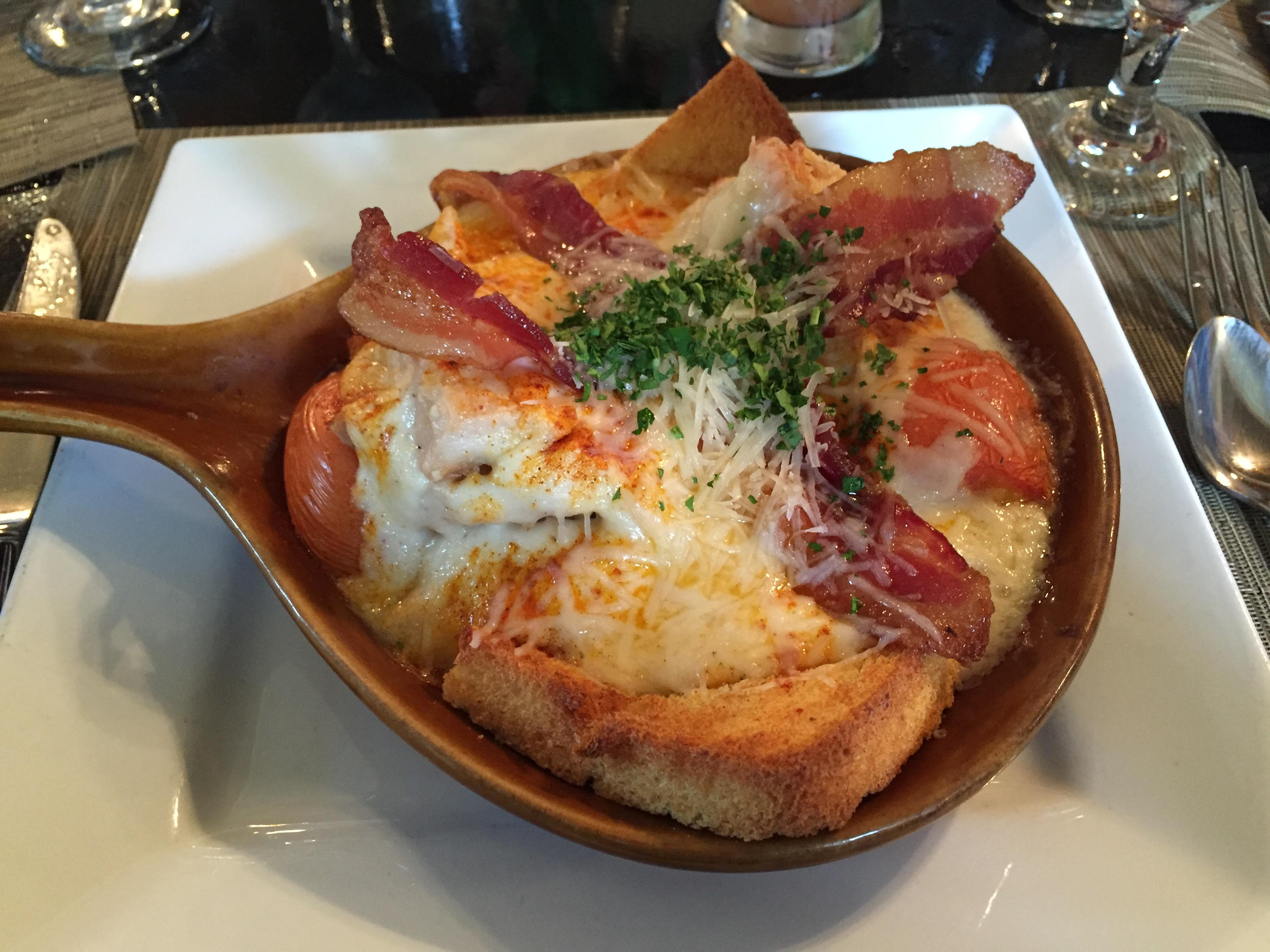
- An example of a Hot Brown
- Type: Sandwich
- Place of origin: United States
- Region or state: Louisville, Kentucky
- Created by: Fred K. Schmidt, Brown Hotel
- Serving temperature: Hot
- Main ingredients: Turkey, bacon, Mornay sauce
- Variations: Some versions also use ham, pimentos and/or tomatoes

A Hot Brown sandwich (sometimes known as a Louisville Hot Brown or Kentucky Hot Brown) is an American hot sandwich originally created at the Brown Hotel in Louisville, Kentucky, by Fred K. Schmidt in 1926. It is a variation of traditional Welsh rarebit and was one of two signature sandwiches created by chefs at the Brown Hotel shortly after its founding in 1923. It was created to serve as an alternative to ham and egg late-night dinners.

== Ingredients ==
The Hot Brown is an open-faced sandwich of turkey breast and bacon, covered in creamy Mornay sauce and baked or broiled until the bread is crisp and the sauce begins to brown. Alternatives for garnishes include tomatoes, mushroom slices, and, very rarely, canned peaches.

Some Hot Browns also include ham with the turkey, and either pimentos or tomatoes over the sauce, and imitation Hot Browns sometimes substitute a commercial cheese sauce instead of the Mornay.

When Fred K. Schmidt created the Hot Brown, its sliced roast turkey was a rarity, as turkey was usually reserved for holiday feasts. The original Hot Brown included the sliced turkey on an open-faced white toast sandwich, with Mornay sauce covering it, with a sprinkling of Parmesan cheese, completed by being oven-broiled until bubbly. Pimento and bacon strips were then added to it. After its debut, it quickly became the choice of 95% of the Brown Hotel's restaurant customers.

The dish is a local specialty and favorite of the Louisville area, and is popular throughout Kentucky. It was long unavailable at its point of origin, as the Brown Hotel was shuttered from 1971 to 1985.

== Variations ==
The "cold brown" is baked poultry (chicken or turkey), hard-boiled egg, lettuce, and tomato open-faced on rye bread, and covered with Thousand Island dressing. It is rarely served anymore.

In St. Louis, the Prosperity Sandwich is a similar dish, with origins at the Mayfair Hotel in the 1920s. It is still served in the area today, and sometimes called a "hot brown".

The Turkey Devonshire, first served in Pittsburgh, Pennsylvania, in the 1930s, has been described as being similar to the Hot Brown.

== In the media ==
On the Food Network, the Hot Brown was featured in an episode of Throwdown! with Bobby Flay. Joe and John Castro, chefs of the Brown Hotel in Kentucky, competed and won against Flay in a cook-off. It has also been featured on episodes of the network's shows The Rachael Ray Show and Southern Fried Road Trip. On the Travel Channel, the Hot Brown has been featured on the show Taste of America with Mark DeCarlo, a Louisville-themed episode of Man v. Food Nation and a 2018 episode of Food Paradise titled "Sandwich Heroes". On Bravo, the sandwich was featured in a Top Chef: Kentucky Quickfire challenge.

On PBS, the Hot Brown has been featured in the documentary Sandwiches That You Will Like as well as the program The Mind of a Chef, where Chef David Chang presented his interpretation of the sandwich.

== See also ==
- Cuisine of Kentucky
- History of Louisville, Kentucky
- Melt sandwich
- List of American sandwiches
- List of regional dishes of the United States
- List of sandwiches
