= Paula's Home Cooking =

- Paula's Home Cooking
- Created by: Paula Deen
- Starring: Paula Deen
- Opening theme: "Rush Hour" by Javier Matos and Paul Taylor
- Country of origin: United States
- No. of episodes: 135+

Production
- Running time: 30 minutes

Original release
- Network: Food Network
- Release: 2002 – 2012

Paula's Home Cooking is a Food Network show hosted by Paula Deen. Deen's primary culinary focus was Southern cuisine and familiar comfort food popular with Americans. Over 135 episodes of the series aired between 2002 and 2012. Food Network announced in 2013 that it would not be renewing Deen's contract.

== Synopsis ==
Paula's Home Cooking showcases classic dishes such as pot roast, fried okra, fried chicken and pecan pie are the norm, and overly complicated or eccentric recipes are usually eschewed. Dishes that are flavorful and familiar are spotlit, although the fat content and calorie count of the meals is often very high. Paula features vignettes of Savannah, Georgia, where she co-owns The Lady & Sons with her sons Jamie and Bobby.

== Production ==
Despite its Southern atmosphere, Paula's Home Cooking was taped in upstate New York until 2006; since then, shows had been taped at Deen's new home near Savannah. In 2008, Deen began work on a revamped version of the series called Paula's Best Dishes, in which friends and family join her in the kitchen to prepare recipes. Deen's sons often appeared as guests on the show. They too proved to be popular among Food Network's audience and now have their own show, Road Tasted, similar to Rachael Ray's Tasty Travels. Deen's husband, Michael Groover, also appeared sporadically as a guest, and Food Network taped the Deen-Groover wedding in 2004 as a special edition of the show. The success of Paula's Home Cooking led to a line of cookbooks, a magazine, other television shows and specials, and related merchandise. Reruns of the show now air on Food Network's sister channel GAC.

Deen's popularity, spurred by the show, led to a small role in the feature film Elizabethtown.

=== Cancellation ===
On June 21, 2013, the Food Network announced that they would not renew Deen's contract due to controversy surrounding Deen's use of a racial slur made 30 years earlier, effectively cancelling the series.
