= Johnny Cakes (The Sopranos) =

- The Sopranos episode
- Episode no.: Season 6 Episode 8
- Directed by: Tim Van Patten
- Written by: Diane Frolov; Andrew Schneider
- Cinematography by: Alik Sakharov
- Production code: 608
- Original air date: April 30, 2006
- Running time: 54 minutes

Episode chronology
← Previous "Luxury Lounge"	Next → "The Ride"
- The Sopranos season 6

"Johnny Cakes" is the 73rd episode of the HBO original series The Sopranos and the eighth of the show's sixth season. Written by Diane Frolov and Andrew Schneider, and directed by Tim Van Patten, it originally aired on April 30, 2006. The episode focuses on Tony Soprano being solicited to sell his building, Vito Spatafore beginning a gay affair, and A.J. Soprano seeking vengeance for Tony being shot. The episode had positive reviews, with critics questioning the execution of the subplot about Vito's affair.

== Starring ==
- James Gandolfini as Tony Soprano
- Lorraine Bracco as Dr. Jennifer Melfi
- Edie Falco as Carmela Soprano
- Michael Imperioli as Christopher Moltisanti
- Dominic Chianese as Corrado Soprano, Jr.
- Steven Van Zandt as Silvio Dante
- Tony Sirico as Paulie Gualtieri *
- Robert Iler as Anthony Soprano, Jr.
- Jamie-Lynn Sigler as Meadow Soprano *
- Aida Turturro as Janice Soprano Baccalieri *
- Frank Vincent as Phil Leotardo
- Joseph R. Gannascoli as Vito Spatafore
- Dan Grimaldi as Patsy Parisi

* = credit only

=== Guest starring ===
- Peter Bogdanovich as Dr. Elliot Kupferberg
- Cameron Boyd as Matt Testa
- Elizabeth Bracco as Marie Spatafore
- John Costelloe as Johnny Cakes
- Joseph Leone as Vic Caputo
- Julianna Margulies as Julianna Skiff
- Artie Pasquale as Burt Gervasi
- Vincent Piazza as Hernan O'Brien
- Emily Wickersham as Rhiannon
- Susan Blommaert as Betty Wolf
- Frank Borrelli as Vito Spatafore, Jr.
- Jayson Ward Williams as Coffeehouse Manager
- Sylvia Kauders as Mrs. Conte
- Nic Novicki as Little Person
- Christopher Carley as Drew
- Noah Keen as Otto
- Alexandra Daddario as a woman in the club.
- Nikki Dinki as Bibi
- Stink Fisher as Warren
- Jeff Keilholtz as Party Doctor
- Richard Zekaria as Farhad
- Piter Marek as Daryl
- Elizabeth Meadows Rouse as Mom
- Samuel Smith as Orderly
- Malachy Cleary as Thad McCone
- Daniel Ahearn as Elliot
- Jason Betts as Ron
- Susan Barnes Walker as Mrs. Kimball
- Antony Hagopian as Emmerich
- Chris McGarry as Pat
- Lindsey Kraft as Nadia
- Steve S. Stanulis as Desk Sergeant
- Chris McGinn as Waitress
- Rene Rosado as Hispanic Kid

== Synopsis ==
A.J. spends most of his time hanging out in New York nightclubs. To finance this lifestyle, A.J. sells the drum kit Tony gave him. The money is used to pay a huge tab he racks up trying to seduce a girl at a club owned by an associate of his father's. AJ asks his parents to provide him with a nightclub to manage, a suggestion they scoff at as he is still below the legal drinking age. Carmela wants him to study event planning, and Tony offers to get him a job at Beansie's pizzeria. In a session with Dr. Melfi, Tony says that A.J.'s presence is "like a bad smell in the house. It's always hanging there".

One evening, after slumping at home all day, A.J. takes a knife and goes to see Junior in the mental hospital. When Junior sees him, he begs him to take him home. Unnerved, A.J. drops the knife before even attempting to use it against Junior and is tackled by orderlies as he tries to flee. Using his influence with Assemblyman Zellman, Tony gets his son released from custody without charges. Tony is furious, but A.J. tearfully tells him that he was trying to avenge Tony like Michael Corleone in The Godfather. During A.J.'s next night out clubbing, an acquaintance asks him to get Tony to help him in a dispute with his landlord. A.J. retreats to the restroom, where he has a panic attack.

Vito steals the cell phone of a fellow guest at his bed-and-breakfast in New Hampshire and uses it to call his wife Marie. She begs him to come home and tells him that Phil wishes to put him through "treatment" for his homosexuality. He tells her not to trust Phil (who is pressuring Tony to find Vito and kill him) and informs her where to find $30,000 cash in the house.

Pretending to be a writer, Vito spends more time at Jim's diner. Jim is revealed to also be a father. One evening, Vito sees Jim, a volunteer firefighter, heroically rescuing a young child. He spends an evening with the firefighters at a local roadhouse; in the parking lot, Vito and Jim appear to kiss, but Vito then shoves him off. They throw punches, and Jim leaves Vito beaten. Days later, Vito goes back to the diner. "Sometimes you tell a lie so long, you don't know when to stop," he says. He and Jim take a motorcycle ride together. In a field, under the falling leaves, they have sex.

Tony manages to have sex with Carmela for the first time since his injury, but he later finds himself attracted to another woman: Julianna Skiff, a real estate agent who approaches him with an offer from Jamba Juice to buy a building he owns, rented to a long-established company, Caputo's Poultry. Tony rejects the deal, stating that the poultry store is part of its neighborhood. He rejects a second offer but accepts the third—nearly half a million dollars—and she agrees that they should meet in her apartment to complete the paperwork. While Tony is dressing for the encounter, Carmela helps pick out a shirt for him and helps him to button it up. At Julianna's, after Tony signs the paperwork, they start kissing passionately, and Julianna starts unbuttoning his shirt. Tony makes her stop and abruptly departs. At home with Carmela, he lashes out, claiming he's angry because there's no smoked turkey in the fridge.

Burt and Patsy make collections in the neighborhood of Tony's property. They fail to extort money from the newly opened branch of a major coffee chain. Caputo furiously tells them Tony has sold his store premises. "What the fuck is happening to this neighborhood?" Patsy says.

== First appearances ==
- Julianna Skiff: a real estate agent with whom Tony almost has an affair.
- Rhiannon: an ex-girlfriend of Hernan O'Brien, hanging out with A.J. and others at the nightclub.

== Title reference ==
The episode's title refers to a johnnycake, a type of pancake that is a local specialty at a diner frequented by Vito. "Johnny Cakes" also becomes Vito's pet name for Jim.

== Production ==
- The setting for the East Haledon Police Department was filmed at the police headquarters in West Orange, New Jersey. It was filmed in the back of the building to give the look of a more rural and suburban town in Northern New Jersey.

== Music ==
- The song that plays outdoors, when Burt and Patsy first enter Caputo's Poultry, is a variation of "Tic, Tic Tac" by the Brazilian band Carrapicho.
- The song playing when Vito is in the diner is "Sunny Came Home" by Shawn Colvin.
- The songs playing in the New York club are "Ready2Wear" (Paper Faces Remix) by Felix Da Housecat and "E Talking" by Soulwax.
- The song that is played at the Bada Bing! during Julianna and Tony's conversation is "Family Affair" by Mary J. Blige.
- The song played during the end credits is "I'm Gonna Move to the Outskirts of Town" by Ray Charles.

== Reception ==
Television Without Pity graded the episode with an A. However, it criticized one minor continuity error in the scene with Tony and AJ on a boat, because AJ's hair was longer there than in other scenes. Responding to the scene of Tony complaining to Dr. Melfi about AJ being lazy, Television Without Pity commented: "...let's just chalk AJ up to overly permissive parenting..."

The subplot about Vito developing feelings for Jim was questioned by critics, with Television Without Pity comparing it to a "bad '50s melodrama". Star-Ledger critic Alan Sepinwall called some dialogue in the Vito scenes "corny" while praising the episode as "one that continued to push this season's themes of identity and change." Matthew Gilbert of The Boston Globe regarded the Vito/Jim affair as "one of the series’ gentlest portrayals of love" while acknowledging that Sopranos viewers felt divided about it.
