= Bobby Deen =

American television chef and restaurant manager (born 1970)

- Born: Robert Earl Deen; April 28, 1970 (age 56); Albany, Georgia, US
- Spouse: Claudia Lovera (m. 2013)
- Children: 3
- Mother: Paula Deen
- Relatives: Jamie Deen (brother)
- Culinary career
- Television shows: Holiday Baking Championship; Junk Food Flip; Not My Mama's Meals; Spring Baking Championship

Robert Earl Deen (born April 28, 1970) is an American television chef, TV personality, and restaurant manager.

He is the second son of Paula Deen, and with his brother Jamie, he operated her restaurant the Lady & Sons, in Savannah, Georgia, until it closed on July 31, 2025. He also frequently appeared on her shows Paula's Home Cooking and Paula's Party.

== Career ==
Deen and his brother Jamie had their own show, Road Tasted, which launched in July 2006. They eventually decided that they wanted to devote more time to their family restaurant in Savannah, Georgia, the Lady & Sons, which they ran with their mother, Paula, until it closed on July 31, 2025.

In January 2012, Deen debuted his own cooking show, Not My Mama's Meals, on the Cooking Channel, in which he tweaks his mother's recipes to recreate them in a healthier manner.

Deen also served as the host of the Food Network cooking competition series Holiday Baking Championship and Spring Baking Championship. He is also co-host of the Cooking Channel series Junk Food Flip.

Deen has published several books, four of which are in collaboration with his brother. These include The Deen Bros. Cookbook - Recipes From the Road (2007), Y'all Come Eat (2008), Take it Easy (2009), and Get Fired Up (2011). In early 2013, he released his first solo book, From Mama's Table to Mine, which became a No. 1 New York Times Bestseller.

In April 2015, Deen and his brother began filming the TV show Southern Fried Road Trip for the Food Network, "in search of the best local, handcrafted foods".

Deen made his feature film debut in 2017, appearing in the movie In Search of Liberty.

== Recognition ==
In 2006, Deen was named one of the "50 Most Eligible Bachelors" by People magazine.

== Personal life ==
Deen announced his engagement to Claudia Lovera on April 24, 2013, and discussed the event on the Fox News morning show Fox & Friends. In July 2013, he and Lovera married at a ceremony at his mother's house.
