= Junk Food Flip =

- Genre: Food reality television
- Starring: Bobby Deen; Nikki Dinki
- Country of origin: United States
- Original language: English
- No. of seasons: 2
- No. of episodes: 11

Production
- Producer: Lion Television

Original release
- Network: Cooking Channel
- Release: August 27, 2014 – February 23, 2016

Junk Food Flip is an American cooking-themed television series that aired on Cooking Channel. The series is presented by chef Bobby Deen as well as chef Nikki Dinki, who was a contestant on the ninth season of the Food Network series Food Network Star. The series features the chefs visiting restaurants to eat high-calorie guilty pleasure foods and later challenging the restaurant owners with similar, lower-calorie versions of the foods.

The pilot episode aired on August 27, 2014. Deen did not appear in the pilot, but he was added when it was picked up as a series, which officially premiered on June 2, 2015. The second season of the series premiered on January 19, 2016 and concluded on February 23, 2016.
