= The Gordon Elliott Show =

American syndicated talk show

- Genre: Talk show
- Directed by: Brian Campbell
- Presented by: Gordon Elliott
- Country of origin: United States
- Original language: English
- No. of seasons: 3

Production
- Executive producer: Terry Weible Murphy
- Production locations: Unitel Studios New York City, NY
- Running time: 42–43 minutes
- Production companies: CBS Entertainment Productions (1994–1996); Eyemark Entertainment (1996-1997)

Original release
- Network: Syndication
- Release: September 12, 1994 – September 5, 1997

The Gordon Elliott Show is an American first-run syndicated talk show that was hosted by Gordon Elliott. It ran for three seasons in syndication from September 12, 1994, to September 5, 1997, and was produced by CBS Productions and distributed by 20th Television.

== Production ==
=== Guest and audience recruitment ===
Elliott believed that many guests appeared on the show to reveal their intimate stories due to a belief that they were unheard in their personal lives.

== Broadcast history and release ==
In January 1997, Eyemark Productions informed some production staff that the show would be ceasing production. Production ceased on February 27, 1997, and the show's cancelation was announced on March 19, 1997.

== Reception ==
=== Critical response ===
Richard Ginell of Variety described the show as "a circus that doesn’t prove anything", although he believed it had potential dependent on its topic selection.
