= Door Knock Dinners =

Television series

Door Knock Dinners is a program that aired on Food Network in the late 1990s. The program featured Gordon Elliott taking a guest chef (or himself) into the home of a busy person/household and cooking the family a dinner using only the items they had in their home.

The Door Knock Dinners guest chef list includes the following:

- Paula Deen – her appearance on the show led to her debuting her own show, Paula's Home Cooking, in November 2002.
- Tyler Florence
- Rokusaburo Michiba and Masaharu Morimoto – appeared on the show and prepared dinner for a family in Rye, New York ahead of Morimoto's first Iron Chef battle against Bobby Flay in New York City, which Elliott was the English-speaking MC for. The show adapted many Iron Chef mechanics in honor of them, including graphics and announcers as if the challenge were a Kitchen Stadium battle, and footage from the show was used in the Iron Chef New York Special, including the original Japanese version that aired on Fuji TV.

== Reception ==
In a negative review, Michael Farkash of The Hollywood Reporter called the show "a disappointing, disjointed presentation", writing, "Better jokes or even more sarcastic gibes are needed to spice up the show." Rolling Stone reviewer Chris Napolitano thought the show was "the best dinner theater on the tube". The Associated Press's Lynn Elber found Elliott's performance to be "refreshingly quirky" and praised the program's "homespun sweetness".
