= Road Tasted =

- Also known as: Road Tasted with Pat and Gina Neely
- Created by: Gordon Elliott
- Starring: currently: Pat and Gina Neely originally: Jamie Deen and Bobby Deen
- Country of origin: United States
- No. of episodes: 12

Production
- Running time: 30 minutes

Original release
- Network: Food Network

Road Tasted is a television program shown on Food Network in the United States. The show was originally hosted by Jamie Deen and Bobby Deen, the sons of the popular Food Network host Paula Deen, as they drove around the United States searching for the best in family-run food businesses. It premiered on July 11, 2006.

Road Tasted was created by Gordon Elliott, a long-time friend of Paula Deen.

One of the show's primary appeals is that the businesses featured on the show can ship many of their products directly to customers. As such, the program always includes information about how to order the items shown.

Before Food Network settled on Road Tasted, the show had the working title Two for the Road.

The Deen brothers eventually decided that they wanted to devote more time to their family restaurant, and thus did not continue as hosts. The show has since been renamed Road Tasted with the Neelys featuring the Food Network hosts Pat and Gina Neely.
