= It's Your Chance of a Lifetime =

American game show

- Genre: Game show
- Based on: Million Dollar Chance of a Lifetime by Stephen Leahy
- Directed by: Bob Levy
- Presented by: Gordon Elliott
- Narrated by: Mark Thompson
- Composer: Edgar Struble
- Country of origin: United States
- Original language: English
- No. of seasons: 1
- No. of episodes: 5

Production
- Executive producers: Brad Lachman; Stephen Leahy
- Producers: Garry Bormet; Bill Bracken
- Editors: David Harrison; Mark Elmer
- Production companies: Brad Lachman Productions; Carlton America; Action Time

Original release
- Network: Fox
- Release: June 5 – June 10, 2000

It's Your Chance of a Lifetime is an American game show that aired on Fox in June 2000. Gordon Elliott hosted the show, with Mark Thompson serving as announcer (only to do the opening intro and contestant call-in at the end).

The show was an adaptation of the Australian game show The $1,000,000 Chance of a Lifetime; the name was changed in the United States because an unrelated 1980s game show had already used the name.

== Broadcast information ==
It's Your Chance of a Lifetime aired from June 5 to June 10, 2000, but was canceled before it was to begin as a weekly series the following week. The show was supposed to have aired five nights in a row from June 5 to June 9; however, when ABC decided to put a special episode of Who Wants to Be a Millionaire? opposite it on June 7, Fox opted to not air an episode that day and delayed the remaining episodes one day each. Had the show made it to a regular time slot, it would have aired on Wednesdays in the early (8 ET/7 CT) time slot.

It's Your Chance of a Lifetime was one of the last entries in a boom in million-dollar game shows, fueled by the success of Who Wants to Be a Millionaire?, that aired during the 1999–2000 season; others included CBS's Winning Lines, NBC's revival of Twenty One and Fox's own Greed, which was still airing at the time (concluding its run a month after Chance left the air). Most of the other million-dollar game shows had been canceled that May.

== Rules of the game ==
A solo player (chosen randomly from the audience) competed for a chance to win over $1,000,000 by answering a series of 10 open-ended questions. The first of these was a "Credit Card Question"; if the player answered correctly, their entire credit card bills were paid off, to a maximum of $10,000. They were also invited to run the billing statement through an onstage paper shredder, and kept the payoff regardless of the outcome of the game. An incorrect answer ended the game immediately and sent the player home with no winnings. An eligible credit card statement had to be issued at most a full year before the month of taping.

A list of 10 categories was displayed, with each of the nine remaining questions drawn from a different category. The second question awarded $5,000 if answered correctly or ended the game for a miss. After giving a correct answer on any question, the player was told the category for the next question and had to decide whether to continue the game, or end it and keep all winnings. If the player chose to continue, they had to risk at least half of their total (exclusive of the credit card payoff), and had two minutes to give an answer and lock it in by pressing a button on their podium. Failing to respond within the time limit was counted as an automatic miss. If the player answered correctly, the amount of the wager was added to their bank; if they missed, it was deducted and the game ended, with the player keeping whatever was left of their bank.

The category list was always visible to the player and consisted of the following: Pop Culture, Famous Events, Movies, Famous Places, TV, Pop Music, Toys and Games, People, In the News, and Animal Kingdom. Categories were chosen at random before each turn and were removed from play after being used once.

The player was given two forms of assistance referred to as "Second Chances", each of which could be used once at any time. One Second Chance gave the player three multiple-choice options (one of which was the right answer), while the other discarded the current question and replaced it with one from the player's favorite category, which was chosen out of the category list before the show. Reaching the final three questions awarded a "Last Chance", which allowed them an extra use of either Second Chance. Using a Second Chance reset the timer for the question.

If the player answered all 10 questions correctly, they won all money accumulated during the game, for a potential prize of $1,290,000 including the credit card payoff. The show's biggest winner was Dr. Tim Hsieh, who collected $1,042,309.16 in his game.

All winnings totals over $200,000 were paid as an annuity.
