= Turkey Devonshire =

Open sandwich

The Turkey Devonshire sandwich, sometimes simply called a Devonshire, originated in 1934 in Pittsburgh, Pennsylvania. It is typically served as a hot open-faced sandwich on toasted bread with hot turkey, bacon, tomatoes, and a cheese sauce. The sandwich is similar to a Kentucky Hot Brown.

It was created by Frank Blandi (1907–1999), a Sicilian American, who first served them at the Stratford Club located at the corner of Centre and Millvale Avenues, on the border between Pittsburgh's Bloomfield and Shadyside neighborhoods. The club had an English atmosphere and the sandwich was named after Devonshire Street, located one block away. This sandwich's heyday was in the 1960s, but it remains a local favorite hot sandwich. It is believed this sandwich was influenced by the 21 Club’s trendy chicken hash, a dish of diced chicken covered in Mornay sauce and then browned.

== See also ==
- List of sandwiches
