= Paula's Party =

- Created by: Paula Deen
- Starring: Paula Deen
- Country of origin: United States
- No. of episodes: 41

Production
- Running time: 60 minutes

Original release
- Network: Food Network
- Release: 2006 – 2008

Paula's Party is a show on the Food Network hosted by Paula Deen. Unlike her other show on the Food Network, Paula's Home Cooking, Paula's Party was originally taped in front of a small audience at Uncle Bubba's Oyster House in Savannah, Georgia, and Deen herself frequently interacts with audience members. In 2008, taping of the show moved from Savannah to Food Network studios in New York City.

In the program, Deen offers help to audience members who have culinary problems. This new format allows her to be friendly with her guests; frequently she sits on the laps of various male audience members and feeds them sensuously, often making food-related double entendres.

Almost all of Paula's family have appeared on the show: sons Jamie Deen and Bobby Deen, husband Michael Groover, daughter-in-law Brooke Deen, grandson Jack Deen, brother Bubba Hiers (owner of Uncle Bubba's Oyster House), and ex-husband Jimmy Deen.

Paula's Party was first broadcast on September 29, 2006, and is currently broadcast on Saturdays at 7:00 PM Eastern Time on the Food Network.

On June 21, 2013, the Food Network announced that they would not renew Deen's contract due to controversy surrounding Deen's use of a racial slur and racist jokes in her restaurant, effectively cancelling the series. In 2014, Deen's company Paula Deen Ventures bought distribution rights to the episodes from the Food Network.
