= Clarence High School (Clarence, New York) =

High school in Clarence, New York, United States

Location
- 9625 Main St; Clarence, (Erie County), New York 14031; United States
- Coordinates: 42.9723°N 78.6320°W

Information
- School type: Public school (government funded), high school
- Established: 1949
- School district: Clarence Central School District
- NCES District ID: 3607590
- CEEB code: 331385
- NCES School ID: 360759000543
- Principal: Kenneth J. Smith
- Teaching staff: 123.28 (FTE)
- Grades: 9–12
- Enrollment: 1,256 (2023–2024)
- Student to teacher ratio: 10.19
- Campus: Rural: fringe
- Colors: Red and black
- Mascot: Red Devil
- Team name: Red Devils
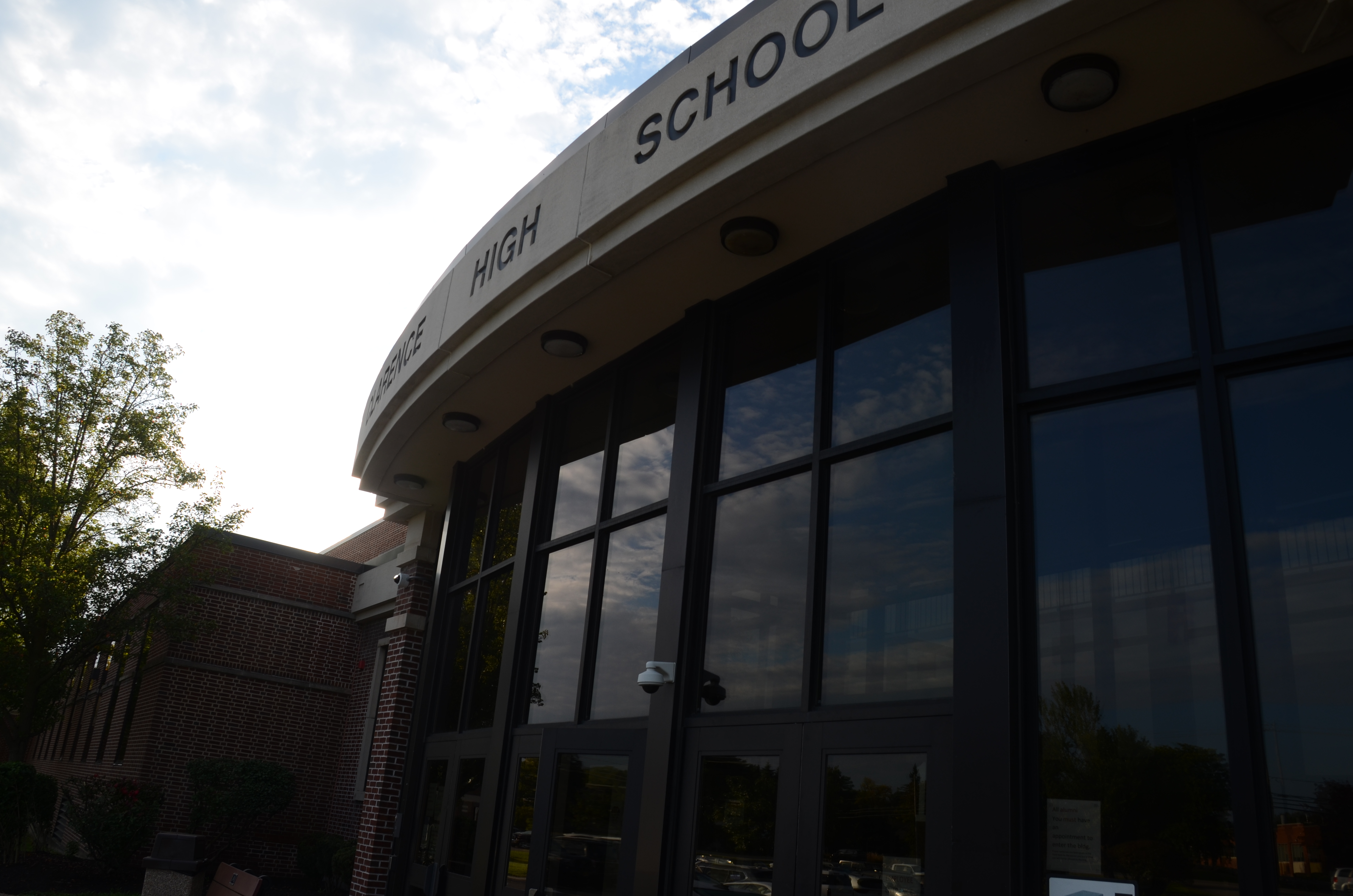

Clarence High School, also known as Clarence Central High School or, formerly, Clarence Senior High School, is a public high school located in Clarence, Erie County, New York, United States. It is the only high school operated by the Clarence Central School District. Kenneth J. Smith is principal.

== Clarence Central School District ==
Established in 1949 by the New York State Board of Regents. The district includes six schools in the Clarence area, east of Buffalo, New York. Matt Frahm is superintendent of schools.

In 2006 and 2007, Clarence stayed in the first spot in the Business First School rankings. In 2009, Clarence was ranked 4th out of 131 Western New York high schools.

=== High school ===
- Clarence High School (Built in 1950), Building Principal - Kenneth J. Smith

=== Middle school ===
- Clarence Middle School (Built in 1963), Building Principal - Ashley Dreibelbis

=== Elementary schools ===
- Clarence Center Elementary (Built in 1938), Principal - Heidie Buffamonte
- Ledgeview Elementary (Built in 1962), Principal - Keith E. Kuwik
- Harris Hill Elementary (Built-in 1953), Principal - Robert Boccaccio
- Sheridan Hill Elementary (Built-in 1958), Principal - Jenna Arroyo

== Notable alumni ==
- Kevyn Adams, NHL forward for the Phoenix Coyotes; alternate captain of the Carolina Hurricanes in 2006; former general manager for the Buffalo Sabres
- Laura Aikin, American operatic coloratura soprano
- Nikki Dinki, chef; finalist on Food Network Stars; TV show host
- Lauren Fix, automotive expert, television host and personality
- Neil Haskell, contemporary dancer; original cast member for Hamilton on Broadway
- Katie MacFarlane, former professional women's basketball player
- Pam MacKinnon, stage director; winner of the 2013 Tony Award for Best Direction of a Play
- Mark Murphy, athlete; co-captain of Super Bowl XVII Champions Washington Redskins, Pro Bowl 1982 and 1983; current President/CEO of the Green Bay Packers; graduated in 1973
- Chad Michael Murray, actor
- Jason Vieaux, classical guitarist; winner of 2015 Grammy for Best Classical Instrumental Solo
- Patrick Wilson, drummer; member of the rock band Weezer
- Chris Pirillo, American entrepreneur and former television host on TechTV.
