= Charlie Vergos =

American restaurateur

Charlie Vergos (June 24, 1925 – March 27, 2010) was a Memphis-style barbecue restaurateur.

Vergos was born in Memphis, Tennessee; his parents were Greek immigrants. He served in the United States Army during World War II. He married Tasia Vergos; they had three children.

In 1948, Vergos founded Charles Vergos' Rendezvous. Vergos also helped to revitalize Memphis' downtown; he refused to relocate out of downtown following the assassination of Martin Luther King Jr. and invested in other downtown businesses.

He developed Memphis-style "dry" ribs, using vinegar and a mix of herbs and spices to season the meat, and cooking the ribs on high heat for around 75 minutes.

Vergos was posthumously inducted into the Barbecue Hall of Fame in 2018.
