= Pat Neely =

American chef

- Born: July 20, 1964 (age 62); Detroit, Michigan, U.S.
- Spouses: Gina Neely (m. 1994; div. 2014) Tamika Parks (m. 2017)
- Children: 4
- Culinary career
- Previous restaurant(s): Neely's Bar-B-Que (Memphis; Nashville)
- Television show(s): Down Home with the Neelys Road Tasted with the Neelys Save to Win
- Website: http://www.patneely.com/

Pat Neely (born July 20, 1964) is an American restaurateur, television personality, and author. He is the co-owner of Neely's Bar-B-Que restaurant in downtown Memphis, Tennessee. He and former wife Gina hosted two Food Network television programs, Down Home with the Neelys and Road Tasted with the Neelys. The pair also co-wrote a cook book. Down Home became the highest rated debut for a Food Network show within the "In the Kitchen" series, which appear on weekend mornings.

== Personal life ==
Personal life

Neely met Gina Ervin, his future second wife and her future 3rd husband, while they were in high school. They married in 1994 and have two daughters, Spenser and Shelbi. Gina filed for divorce in September 2014, citing irreconcilable differences. (Wikipedia)

In 2015, Neely met Tamika Parks, a Certified Registered Nurse Anesthetist, while appearing as a celebrity chef on the Tom Joyner cruise. The couple became engaged in December 2016 and married on October 7, 2017, in a private ceremony at their home outside Atlanta. (People.com)

Neely and Parks have a daughter, Eriel, born in 2018. Neely has also described Parks’ son from a previous relationship, Eijah, as his own child. Together with his two daughters from his first marriage, Neely has four children. (People.com)

== Restaurant ==
In 1988, Neely and three of his brothers (Gaelin, Tony, and Mark) opened a barbecue restaurant in downtown Memphis, aided by their uncle, Jim Neely, a well-known Memphis restaurateur and owner of Jim Neely's Interstate Bar-B-Que. Jim' Neely's sister, Beverly Neely, is owner of Jay-Bee's Bar-B-Que in Gardena, California, and her son, Curtis Williams, is the general manager. The brothers went on to establish their own reputations separate from their uncle's.

The enterprise grew to four Neely’s Bar-B-Que locations: two in Memphis and two in Nashville. On July 9, 2008, the location in Memphis' Mt. Moriah neighborhood caught fire.

Pat and Gina Neely, and partner Abraham Merchant, opened a New York City restaurant, initially called Neely’s Pig Parlor. The restaurant eventually opened in 2011 as Neely's Barbecue Parlor.

In August 2008, they acquired a 2,000-square-foot (190 m^{2}) space in mid-town Memphis slated to be a corporate headquarters.

In 2008, their cousin (Jim Neely's son) opened Ken Neely's Hickory Bar-B-Que in Memphis.

The two Memphis locations of Neely's Bar-B-Que closed in 2013.

== Television shows ==
Neely and his then-wife Gina were the hosts of two shows on Food Network: Down Home with the Neelys and Road Tasted with the Neelys. Down Home began airing in February 2008. Food Network personality Paula Deen helped the pair get their first show. During the summer of 2006 her sons, Bobby and Jamie Deen, featured the Neely's Bar-B-Que Nashville location on their show Road Tasted. In September 2006, Paula ate at the Neely's downtown Memphis restaurant and was impressed. In January 2007, the Neelys were invited to appear on Paula's Party.

The Neelys taped the sixth season of Down Home, which aired seven days a week on the Food Network. Following the success of Down Home, the Neelys took over the Road Tasted show from the Deen brothers in July 2008, which was then changed to Road Tasted with the Neelys. Neely hosted Save to Win on Saturdays on The CW from November 5, 2016 to May 20, 2017.

== Book ==
In May 2009, Pat and Gina released their first cookbook titled "Down Home with the Neelys: A Southern Family Cookbook." Co-written by Paula Disbrowe, it was published by Knopf and featured a foreword written by Paula Deen.
