= Southern Fried Road Trip =

Southern Fried Road Trip is a television show appearing on the Food Network. It features Bobby Deen and Jamie Deen, the sons of Paula Deen, touring the southern portion of the United States and sampling food. Episodes also featured the customers eating at each establishment the duo visited, as they highlighted various dishes available at restaurants in the region and their impressions of each dish.
