= Down Home with the Neelys =

- Starring: Pat and Gina Neely
- Country of origin: United States
- No. of episodes: 143

Production
- Running time: 30 minutes

Original release
- Network: Food Network

Down Home with the Neelys is a Food Network show hosted by Patrick and Gina Neely. The show depicts the Neelys sharing dishes and recipes. Taped in their Memphis home, the show, which has a relaxed demeanor, aired seven days a week on Food Network from 2008 to 2014. Their daughter Shelbi also made regular appearances in the show.

The show's popularity was based on the cooking and on the seemingly excellent couple relation between Patrick and Gina Neely, who were high school sweethearts. After its February 2008 premiere, the show became the highest-rated series debut in the five-year history of Food Network's "In the Kitchen" weekend block. Gina later revealed that she was about to leave Patrick but the show came along so she waited. She finally broke up with the show and Patrick Neely altogether in 2014.

Following the show and their divorce, Patrick remarried and returned to the restaurant business, while Gina did a bit of reality TV, motivational speaking, and authored a book.

== Cooking style ==
Gina and Pat Neely are known for their Southern cooking, typically barbecue.
