= Paula Deen =

American cook, restaurateur, author, and television personality

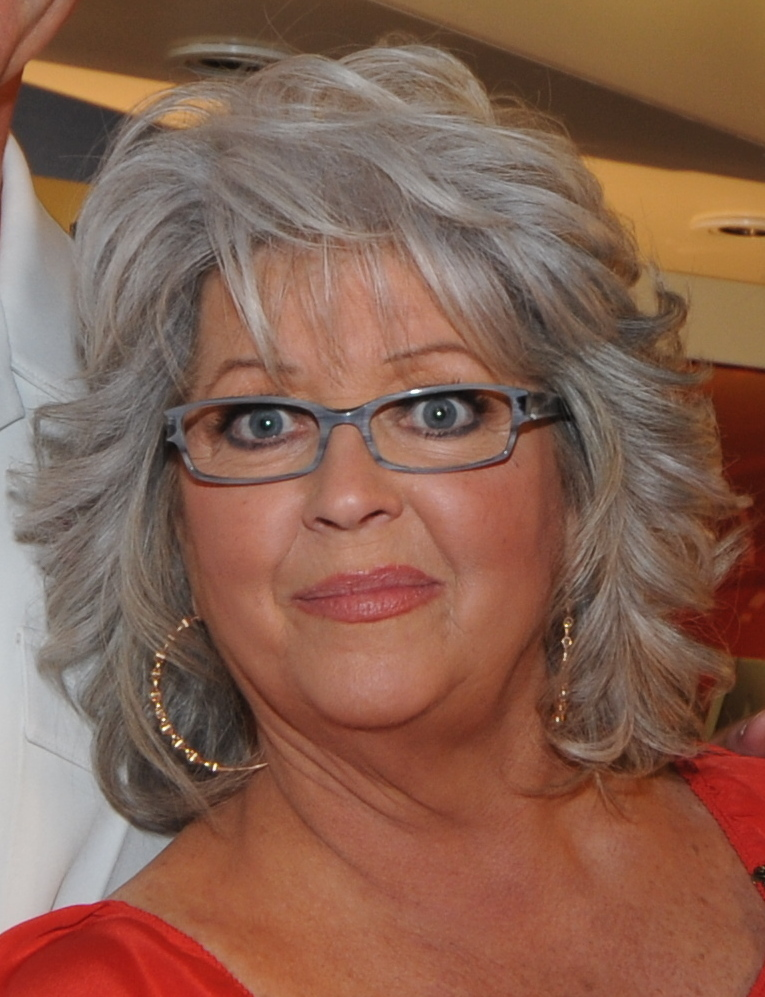
- Deen in 2009
- Born: Paula Ann Hiers; January 19, 1947 (age 79); Albany, Georgia, U.S.
- Spouses: Jimmy Deen (m. 1965; div. 1989) Michael Groover (m. 2004)
- Children: Jamie and Bobby Deen
- Culinary career
- Cooking style: Southern
- Current restaurant
- Paula Deen's Family Kitchen (5 locations)
- Television shows
- Paula's Home Cooking (2002–2013); Paula's Party (2006–2013); Paula's Best Dishes (2008–2013); Positively Paula (2016–present); Paula Deen's Sweet Home Savannah (2017–present)
- Awards
- 2007 Emmy for Outstanding Lifestyle Host
- Website: www.pauladeen.com

Paula Ann Hiers Deen (born January 19, 1947) is an American chef, cookbook author, and TV personality. Deen resides in Savannah, Georgia. She has published fifteen cookbooks and owned and operated The Lady & Sons restaurant with her sons, Jamie and Bobby Deen, until its closure in 2025.

== Early life and family ==
Deen was born Paula Ann Hiers in Albany, Georgia, the daughter of Corrie A. Hiers (née Paul) and Earl Wayne Hiers Sr. Her great-great-great grandfather, John Batts, was a wealthy politician and planter who owned a large plantation near Smithville, Georgia. Deen was 19 when her father died unexpectedly aged 40, and her mother died four years later aged 44. Prior to her father's death, Paula, aged 18, married Jimmy Deen and in 1967 they had their first son James ("Jamie"), and in 1970 a second son Robert ("Bobby") was born. In her 20s, Deen suffered from depression and agoraphobia and began to spend more time preparing food for her family, as it was something she could do without leaving her house. Deen's cooking style had been informed by her grandmother Irene Paul, who had taught her the art of Southern cooking that Deen described as "real farmhouse cooking, the kind that takes all day". In 1989, Deen and her husband Jimmy divorced. Needing to support herself, her two sons, and her younger brother Earl ("Bubba"), Deen tried various enterprises before starting a catering service that she called The Bag Lady, making lunches for office workers, which her sons Jamie and Bobby delivered.

== Restaurants ==
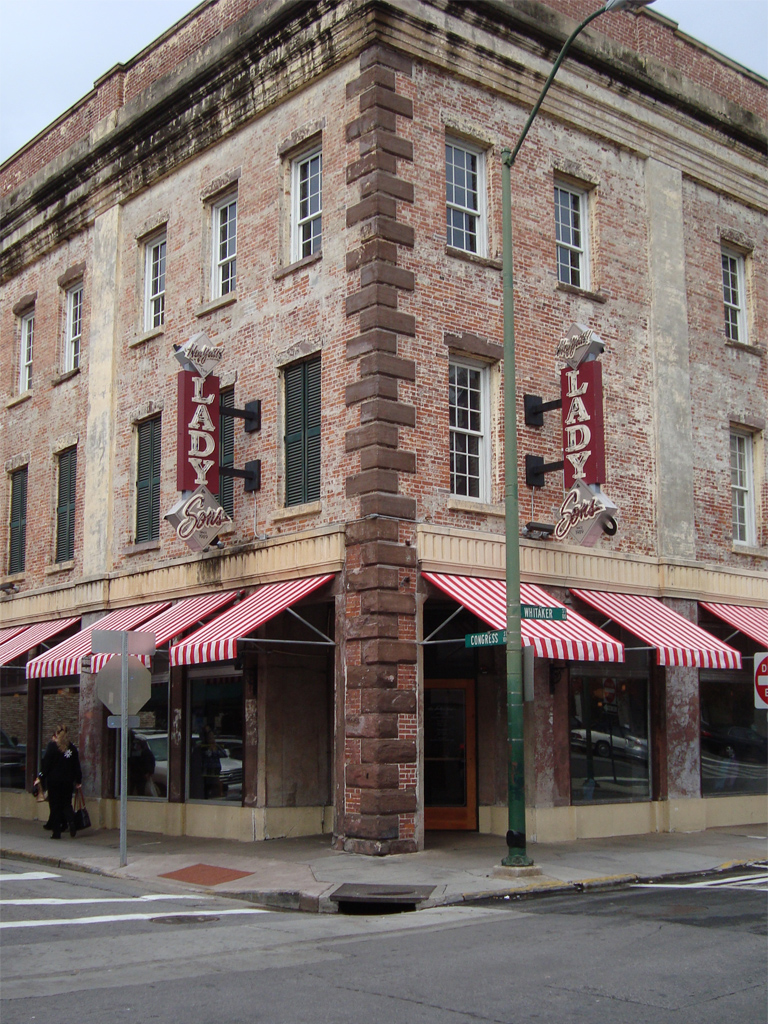
Lady & Sons restaurant in Savannah, Georgia

Following the success of Deen's home-based business, she took a lease for the restaurant as part of a Best Western hotel on Abercorn Street in downtown Savannah, calling it The Lady. In January 1996, after five years at the Best Western, Deen, together with her sons Jamie and Bobby, opened their own restaurant, The Lady & Sons, in downtown Savannah, on West Congress Street. Within a few years, the restaurant moved to the old White Hardware building on Whitaker. The restaurant closed in July 2025. Deen also opened four casino buffets; they were at Harrah's Casino Tunica in Mississippi, Harrah's Cherokee casino in North Carolina, Horseshoe Southern Indiana, and Harrah's Joliet in Illinois. They were rebranded in 2013 shortly after Deen was removed from the Food Network. In addition to these, Deen co-owned Uncle Bubba's Oyster House in Savannah, Georgia. The restaurant closed in April 2014 and reopened in June 2017 as Paula Deen's Creek House, until its permanent closure in January 2023. In 2015, Deen opened Paula Deen's Family Kitchen in Pigeon Forge, Tennessee, and in June 2017, opened another in the city of Myrtle Beach, South Carolina at Broadway at the Beach. In 2018, Deen opened two Paula Deen restaurants in Texas, but both closed the following year. In 2020, Deen opened a Paula Deen's Family Kitchen in Nashville, Tennessee, and in 2021, another in Panama City Beach.

== Books and magazines ==
In 1997, Deen self-published The Lady & Sons Savannah Country Cookbook and The Lady & Sons, Too! A Whole New Batch of Recipes from Savannah. Both cookbooks featured traditional Southern recipes. She has since published two more, written with Martha Nesbit. Deen has appeared on QVC and on The Oprah Winfrey Show (first in 2002, twice in 2007 and once in 2010). Her life story is featured in Extraordinary Comebacks: 201 Inspiring Stories of Courage, Triumph, and Success (2007, Sourcebooks). In April 2007, Simon & Schuster published Deen's memoir, It Ain't All About the Cookin'. She launched a lifestyle magazine called Cooking with Paula Deen in November 2005, which claimed a circulation of 7.5 million in March 2009. As of 2021, the magazine is still being published monthly. In 2015, Paula Deen Ventures signed a distribution agreement with Hachette Client Services for future cookbooks. In 2019, Deen released her latest cookbook, Paula Deen's Southern Baking.

== Food Network and other television ==
Deen's relationship with Food Network began in 1999, when a friend introduced her to Gordon Elliott. Elliott took her through the city for a series of Doorknock Dinners episodes. Deen was invited to shoot a pilot named Afternoon Tea in early 2001. The network liked it, and eventually gave Deen her own show, Paula's Home Cooking, which premiered in November 2002. Paula's Home Cooking was originally taped in Millbrook, New York at Elliott's home, and later, recorded at Deen's own home in Savannah, Georgia.

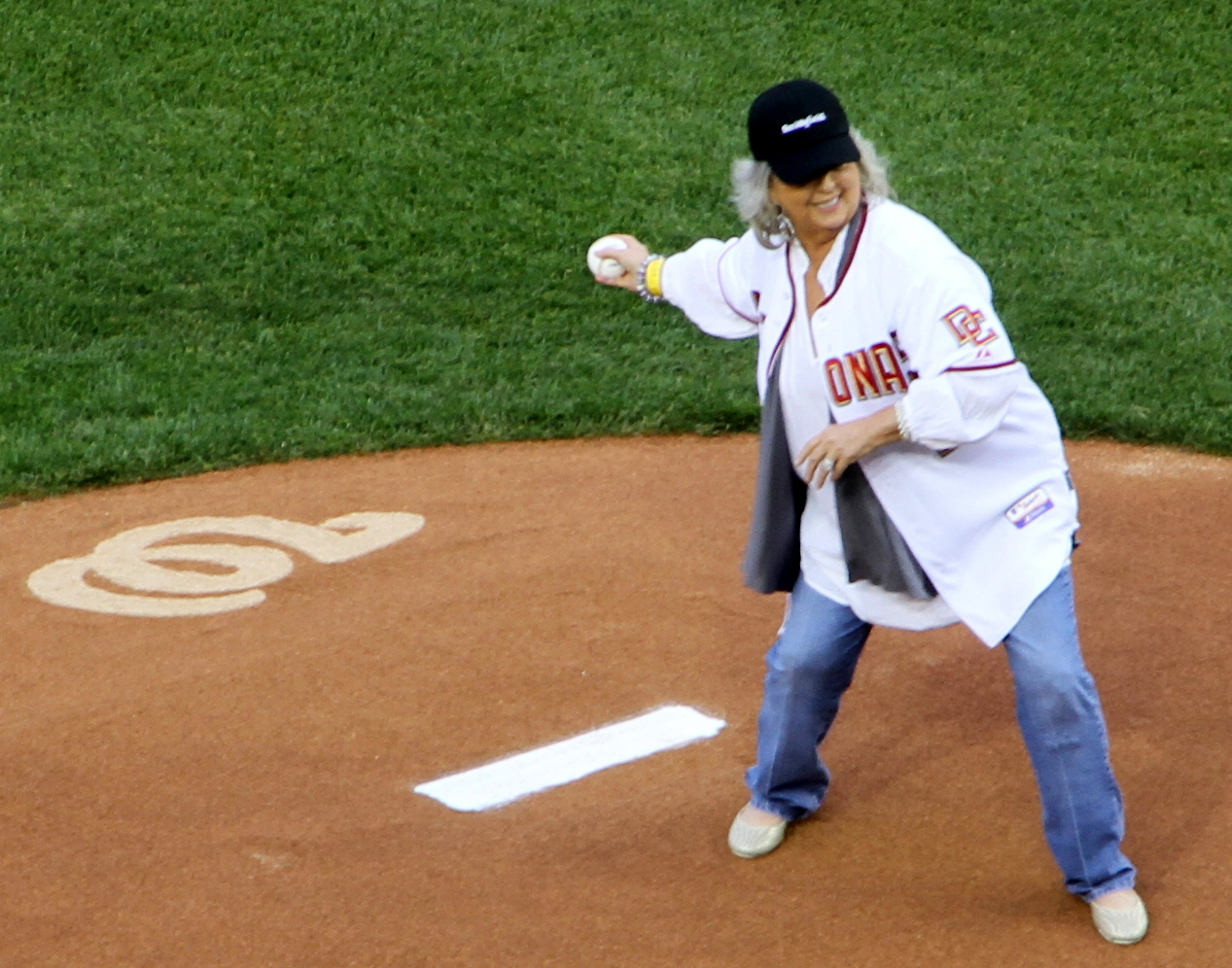
Deen throwing out the first pitch before the game between the New York Mets and the Washington Nationals on May 19, 2010, in Washington

Deen presented two more Food Network shows, Paula's Party and Paula's Best Dishes. Paula's Party premiered on the Food Network in 2006 and Paula's Best Dishes debuted in June 2008. A televised biography of Deen was aired as an episode of the Food Network's Chefography program, in March 2006.

On June 21, 2013, due to a controversy regarding Deen's admission that she had used racial slurs in a social media post, The Food Network announced they would not renew her contract. In March 2015, Deen launched the Paula Deen Channel on Roku. In September 2015, Deen was announced as one of the celebrities to compete on the 21st season of Dancing with the Stars. She was paired with professional dancer Louis van Amstel. The couple was eliminated in the sixth week of competition, finishing in 9th place overall. In October 2016, Deen launched a syndicated television show, Positively Paula. Deen also appears on the home shopping network ShopHQ selling a variety of merchandise including kitchen appliances and food products.

On April 7, 2021, it was announced that Paula Deen would join MasterChef as a guest host for the 11th season premiering in June 2021. Deen, along with other well-known cooks, such as Emeril Lagasse, joined Gordon Ramsay to mentor 15 home cooks through a series of challenges.

== Personal life ==
In 2004, Deen married Michael Groover (born December 1956), a tugboat captain in the Port of Savannah, Georgia. Deen has two children from a previous marriage, as does Groover. The wedding was featured in a Food Network show in 2004 and took place at Bethesda Academy in Savannah.

Paula is a supporter of Bethesda Academy, and asked Old Savannah Tours to donate $1 to the organization for each ticket purchased for the Paula Deen Store ticket sale.

== Other work ==
Deen made her film debut in Elizabethtown (2005), starring Orlando Bloom and Kirsten Dunst. She played the aunt of Bloom's character, and her cooking was featured. A Food Network special, Paula Goes Hollywood, aired in conjunction with the film's premiere.

== Awards and honors ==
In June 2007, Deen won a Daytime Emmy Award (Outstanding Lifestyle Host) for Paula's Home Cooking. In October 2010, she was selected as the grand marshal of the Tournament of Roses Parade, and presided over the 2011 Rose Parade before the Rose Bowl Game on January 1, 2011.

== Criticisms ==
=== Use of sugar in recipes ===
Deen was criticized for her use of sugar by Christina Pirello, a "natural food" advocate and television chef. Cookbook for the Lunch-Box Set, a cookbook aimed at children, was criticized by Barbara Walters, who said of the book, "You tell kids to have cheesecake for breakfast. You tell them to have chocolate cake and meatloaf for lunch. And french fries. Doesn't it bother you that you're adding to this?" Deen replied, "All things in moderation." Celebrity chef Anthony Bourdain commented in 2011 that he "would think twice before telling an already obese nation that it's OK to eat food that is killing us".

On January 17, 2012, Deen announced that she had been diagnosed with Type 2 diabetes three years before. Deen became a paid spokesperson for the Danish pharmaceutical company Novo Nordisk, which produces drugs for the disease.

=== Racial slur controversy ===
In June 2013, Deen was sued by Lisa Jackson for racial and sexual discrimination. Jackson said that Deen made derogatory remarks regarding African Americans. Jackson also said that Deen mused about wedding plans for her brother with a "true Southern plantation-style theme" with black male servers but rejected the plans "because the media would be on me about that". In early August 2013, Judge William Moore threw out the suit's race-discrimination claims, ruling Jackson, who is white, had no standing to sue over what the plaintiff said was poor treatment of black workers; however, Judge Moore let Jackson's claims of sexual discrimination stand. Roughly two weeks later, lawyers reached a dismissal deal to drop the lawsuit, prompting some to surmise that a settlement had been reached out of court, though details of the dismissal deal have not been made public.

The suit originally brought little fanfare with it; however, Deen's eventual deposition created a firestorm in the press. Deen stated in her deposition that she had "of course" used the "N-word" at times. Specifically, she recalled telling her husband about an incident "when a black man burst into the bank that I was working at and put a gun to my head. ... I didn't feel real favorable towards him." Asked if she had used the word since then, she said: "I'm sure I have, but it's been a very long time ... maybe in repeating something that was said to me ... probably a conversation between blacks. I don't – I don't know. But that's just not a word that we use as time has gone on. Things have changed since the '60s in the south."

In the time between the filing of the suit and the suit being dismissed, Deen had cookery programs, publishing deals and endorsement contracts cancelled by Food Network, Smithfield Foods, Walmart, Target, QVC, Caesars Entertainment, Novo Nordisk, J.C. Penney, Sears/ Kmart, and her then-publisher Ballantine Books; however, several companies have expressed their intent to continue their endorsement deals with Deen. During the same time, sales of Deen's cookbooks soared. Former US President Jimmy Carter urged that Deen be forgiven, stating, "I think she has been punished, perhaps overly severely, for her honesty in admitting it and for the use of the word in the distant past. She's apologized profusely."

=== I Love Lucy controversy ===
In July 2015, Deen faced controversy over a Halloween picture from 2011 in which she was dressed as Lucy Ricardo (a character played by Lucille Ball) while her son Bobby was dressed as Lucy's Cuban husband Ricky Ricardo, played by Cuban-American Desi Arnaz, in skin-darkening makeup ("brownface"), along with Gordon Elliott, who was not in costume. The photo was taken from a holiday-themed episode of her former Food Network show Paula's Best Dishes with a tweet mimicking Arnaz's accented English on the show. The material was taken down quickly.

== Filmography ==
Year	Title	Role
2002–2012	Paula's Home Cooking (television)	Host
2005	Elizabethtown	Aunt Dora
2006–2008	Paula's Party (television)	Host
2006	Chefography (television)	Subject
2008–2013	Paula's Best Dishes (television)	Host
2009	Kathy Griffin: My Life on the D-List (television)	Guest star
2009	Extreme Makeover: Home Edition (television)	Guest star
2011	Top Chef (television)	Guest judge
2012	Oprah's Next Chapter	Subject
2012	Who Do You Think You Are? (television)	Subject
2012–2013	MasterChef (television)	Guest judge
2015	Dancing with the Stars (television)	Contestant (season 21)
2016–present	Positively Paula (television)	Host
2017–present	Paula Deen's Sweet Home Savannah (television)	Host
2020–present	Love & Best Dishes with Paula Deen (web series)	Host
2021	MasterChef: Legends	Guest star

== See also ==
- List of American restaurateurs
- List of Food Network Canada personalities
- List of people from Georgia (U.S. state)
- List of recurring Saturday Night Live characters and sketches by cast member
