= Back from the Dead =

Back from the Dead may refer to:

== Film and television ==
- Back from the Dead (film), a 1957 feature film with Arthur Franz and Marsha Hunt

=== Television episodes ===
- "Back from the Dead", AraBella (Philippine) episode 69 (2013)
- "Back from the Dead", Drop Dead Diva season 2, episode 2 (2010)
- "Back from the Dead", Drop Dead Diva season 5, episode 1 (2013)
- "Back from the Dead", Holby City series 15, episode 33 (2013)
- "Back from the Dead", Horizon (British) series 47, episode 1 (2010)
- "Back from the Dead", Halloween Baking Championship season 7, episode 2 (2021)
- "Back from the Dead", MacGyver (1985) season 3, episode 3 (1987)
- "Back from the Dead", Royal Blood episode 15 (2023)
- "Back from the Dead", The Bill series 23, episode 73 (2007)
- "Back from the Dead", The Brittas Empire series 2, episode 2 (1992)
- "Back from the Dead!", The Marvel Super Heroes episode 18c (1966)
- "Back from the Dead", Watson season 2, episode 2 (2025)

== Literature ==
- Back from the Dead, a 1920 novel by Andrew Soutar
- Back from the Dead, a 1982 novel by George G. Gilman; the fifth installment in the Undertaker series
- Back from the Dead, a 1991 short story anthology edited by Martin H. Greenberg and Charles G. Waugh
- Back from the Dead, a 1992 novel by Carol Gorman
- Back from the Dead, a 1999 novel by Chris Petit
- Back from the Dead, a 2006 Warhammer 40,000 novel by Nick Kyme; the seventh installment in the Necromunda series
- Back from the Dead, One woman's search for the men who walked off America's death row, a 2006 non-fiction book by Joan M. Cheever
- Back from the Dead, a 2011 novel by J. F. Gonzalez
- Back from the Dead, a 2013 novel by Peter Leonard; sequel to the 2012 novel Voices of the Dead
- Back from the Dead, a 2016 memoir by Bill Walton
- Back from the Dead, a 2021 collection by S. T. Joshi

== Music ==
=== Albums ===
- Back from the Dead (Adler album), 2012
- Back from the Dead (Halestorm album), 2022
- Back from the Dead (Obituary album), 1997
- Back from the Dead (Spinal Tap album), 2009
- Back from the Dead (Zombie Girl EP), 2006
- Back from the Dead (Last Dinosaurs EP), 2010

=== Songs ===
- "Back from the Dead" (Halestorm song)
- "Back from the Dead" (Kid Rock song)
- "Back from the Dead" (Skylar Grey song)
- Back from the Dead (mixtape), Chief Keef mixtape

=== Other ===
- Back from the Dead Tour, a 2026 tour by The Cab

== See also ==
- Back from the Grave
- Back to Life
- Resurrection, refers to the literal coming back to life of the biologically dead
- Return to Life
