= List of Halloween Baking Championship episodes =

The following is a list of episodes for the reality television cooking series Halloween Baking Championship on Food Network. Judges are Carla Hall (season 1-11), Sherry Yard (season 1), Ron Ben-Israel (season 1), Sandra Lee (season 2), Damiano Carrara (season 2), Zac Young (season 3+), Lorraine Pascal (season 3–4), Katie Lee (season 5), Stephanie Boswell (season 6+), and Aarti Sequeira (season 12+).

== Series overview ==
Season	Episodes	Originally aired	
Season	Episodes	First aired	Last aired
1	4	October 5, 2015	October 26, 2015
2	5	October 3, 2016	October 31, 2016
3	6	September 25, 2017	October 30, 2017
4	6	September 24, 2018	October 29, 2018
5	6	September 23, 2019	October 28, 2019
6	7	September 14, 2020	October 26, 2020
7	7	September 13, 2021	October 25, 2021
8	8	September 12, 2022	October 31, 2022
9	8	September 11, 2023	October 30, 2023
10	7	September 16, 2024	October 28, 2024
11	7	September 15, 2025	October 27, 2025
12	7	September 14, 2026	October 26, 2026

== Season 1 (2015) ==
Seven bakers and chefs competed in a four-episode baking tournament. One person got eliminated every week until the final episode where one person was eliminated early on and the final three compete for the grand prize of $25,000. Judges for this season are Carla Hall, Ron Ben-Israel, and Sherry Yard.

=== Contestants ===
- 1st - Rudy Martinez, Home Bakery Owner from Queens, New York
- 2nd - Scott Breazeale, Executive Chef from Plymouth, Michigan
- 3rd - Jason Hisley, Bakery Owner and chef from Baltimore, Maryland
- 4th - Ashlee Prisbrey, Baker from Salt Lake City, Utah
- 5th - Audrey Alfaro, Home Baker from Spokane, Washington
- 6th - Erin Cooper, Baker from Owings Mills, Maryland
- 7th - Jennifer Petty, Home Bakery Owner from West Covina, California

=== Episodes ===
Ep. #	Title	Original Air Date
1	"Trick or Treats"	October 5, 2015
	Preliminary Heat: Make a dozen trick-or-treat candy cupcakes in 75 minutes. The contestants had to blindly grab a bag of candy from a "bubbling cauldron" and incorporate them into their cupcakes. Winner: Jason Hisley (His advantage going into the "Main Heat" was being able to switch his card with another contestant, or switch two contestant's cards. He chose to switch his cowboy card with Audrey's pirate card.) Main Heat: The contestants had to blindly pick a card that depicted a classic Halloween costume. They were tasked to create a dessert in 90 minutes that represented that costume. Winner: Audrey Alfaro Eliminated: Jennifer Petty	Judges' Costumes: Sherry Yard (Good Witch); Ron Ben-Israel (Pirate); Carla Hall (Bad Witch)
2	"Monster Mashups"	October 12, 2015
	Preliminary Heat: Mashup two pre-made grocery food items into a dozen tasty treats in 45 minutes. The contestants had to pick from grocery items like cookie dough in a tube and frozen pie crusts. Winner: Erin Cooper (Her advantage was getting ten minutes of sous chef help from judge Sherry Yard.) Main Heat: The contestants each picked two hollow apples from a prop tree; a red apple had a specific flavor and a green apple had a spooky theme. They were tasked to combine flavor and theme into a cohesive dessert, in 90 minutes. Winner: Jason Hisley Eliminated: Erin Cooper	Judges' Costumes: Sherry Yard (Empress Josephine); Ron Ben-Israel (1940s gangster); Carla Hall (1920s flapper)
3	"Field of Screams"	October 19, 2015
	Preliminary Heat: Inspired by autumn hayrides and farms, the contestants have 75 minutes to make creepy doughnuts. Winner: Rudy Martinez (His advantage is revealed partway into the second round; picking and assigning extra ingredients to himself and his competitors.) Main Heat: The contestants must create a graveyard themed pumpkin dessert. Halfway into the competition, Rudy's advantage is brought up. He gets first pick of a basket of mandatory extra ingredients. He takes candied ginger for himself then assigns dried cherries to Scott, cream cheese to Jason, walnuts to Ashlee, and raisins to Audrey. Winner: Rudy Martinez Eliminated: Audrey Alfaro	Judges' Costumes: Sherry Yard (Cleopatra); Ron Ben-Israel (Maharaja); Carla Hall (flamenco dancer)
4	"Haunted House Party"	October 26, 2015
	Preliminary Heat: Make a dessert that looks like a creature associated with haunted houses in 2 hours. Each contestant fishes a key from an urn and are assigned the character written on the key. (Ashlee got "mummy", Scott got "zombie", Rudy got "vampire", and Jason got "skeleton"). In this episode, the weakest dish is eliminated from the first round. Ashlee is eliminated. Winner: Jason Hisley (There is no advantage given in this episode) Main Heat: The final three contestants have 5 hours to create a haunted house cake. Winner of $25,000: Rudy Martinez Eliminated: Scott Breazeale and Jason Hisley	Judges' Costumes: Sherry Yard (Marie Antoinette); Ron Ben-Israel (Carnival dancer); Carla Hall (mermaid); Special Guest: Duff Goldman (werewolf)

=== Results ===
Contestant	1	2	3	4
Rudy	IN	LOW	WIN‡	WINNER
Scott	IN	IN	HIGH	OUT
Jason	HIGH‡	WIN	LOW	OUT‡
Ashlee	IN	HIGH	LOW	OUT^{1}
Audrey	WIN	IN	OUT	
Erin	LOW	OUT‡		
Jennifer	OUT			

^Note 1: Ashlee was eliminated after the finale Preheat.

(WINNER) The contestant won the whole competition.
‡ The contestant won the Pre-Heat challenge.
(WIN) The contestant won the Main Heat challenge.
(HIGH) The contestant had one of the best dishes for that week.
(IN) The contestant performed well enough to move on to the next week.
(LOW) The contestant had one of the bottom dishes for that week, but was not eliminated.
(OUT) The contestant was eliminated for worst dish.

== Season 2 (2016) ==
Seven bakers competed in a five-episode baking tournament. In this season they incorporated midround twists (usually an ingredient the contestants had to add to their confection). The winner got $25,000. Judges for this season are Carla Hall, Sandra Lee, and Damiano Carrara.

=== Contestants ===
- 1st - Michelle Antonishek, Executive Pastry Chef from Cotulla, Texas
- 2nd - Tamara Brown, Home Baker from Baldwin Park, California
- 3rd - Veronica von Borstel, Cake Designer from San Diego, California
- 4th - John Schopp, Pastry Instructor from Roanoke, Virginia
- 5th - Amy Strickland, Bakery Owner from Lake City, Florida^{1}
- 6th - Damien Bagley, Pastry Instructor from Las Vegas, Nevada
- 7th - Brad Rudd, Bakery Manager from Encino, California

^Note 1: Amy Strickland withdrew from the competition, just before the start of the third episode, due to stress concerns since she was 6 months pregnant.

=== Episodes ===
Ep. #	Title	Original Air Date
1	"Monsters, Monsters, Monsters"	October 3, 2016
	Preliminary Heat: Make a dozen bite-sized treats that look like monsters in 60 minutes. Winner: Michelle Antonishek (Her advantage was exclusive use of creepy molds and tools for the second round challenge) Main Heat: The contestants had to make an edible zombie treat in 2 hours. They had to incorporate raspberries into their dessert. Mid-round twist is to incorporate sugar work. Winner: Amy Strickland Eliminated: Brad Rudd	Judges' Costumes: Carla Hall (Uncle Sam); Damiano Carrara (firefighter); Sandra Lee (monarch butterfly)
2	"Cravings from the Grave"	October 10, 2016
	Preliminary Heat: Use ready-made pie crust to make fast mummy treats in 30 minutes. Winner: John Schopp (His advantage was being able to switch his tombstone with another contestant or switch two contestant's tombstones. He chose to switch Amy's "witch hat" with Michelle's "cauldron".) Main Heat: The contestants each picked a little tombstone that had a theme written on the back. They had 2 hours to make a candy stuffed cake inspired by their respective Halloween themes. John got 'eyeball', Damien got 'crystal ball', Amy got 'witch hat', Michelle got 'cauldron', Tamara got 'skull', and Veronica got 'pumpkin'. After the switch, Amy got 'cauldron' and Michelle got 'witch hat'. Mid-round twist is to add lime curd representing slime. Winner: Tamara Brown Eliminated: Damien Bagley	Judges' Costumes: Carla Hall (zombie bride); Damiano Carrara (1950s greaser); Sandra Lee (Victorian vampire)
3	"Haunted Circus"	October 17, 2016
	Preliminary Heat: Bake a half dozen creepy clown cake pops in 45 minutes. Winner: Michelle Antonishek (Her advantage is first choice of two characteristics/themes in the second round.) Main Heat: The contestants each picked one stuffed spider and one stuffed alligator; all wearing tags with different characteristics and different creatures. They had 2 hours to combine both tag descriptions into an edible freak show creature. Michelle picked "fire-breathing" as her characteristic and "snake" as her creature. Tamara paired up "two-headed" "turtle". John paired up "sword-swallowing" "mermaid". And Veronica paired up "werewolf" "strongman". Mid-round twist is to add roasted peanuts. Winner: Tamara Brown Eliminated: No eliminations this episode because Amy Strickland left the competition.	Judges' Costumes: Carla Hall (Little Bo Peep); Damiano Carrara (gondolier); Sandra Lee ("winter")
4	"Spirits Rising"	October 24, 2016
	Preliminary Heat: Make a dessert that looks like a monster's tomb in 60 minutes. Mid-round twist is to incorporate funeral flowers into the design. Winner: Michelle Antonishek (Her advantage is access to Mexican ingredients for the main challenge) Main Heat: The contestants have 90 minutes to make a confection honoring "Dia de los Muertos" (Day of the Dead). Mid-round twist is to incorporate habanero peppers into their desserts. Winner: Michelle Antonishek Eliminated: John Schopp	Judges' Costumes: Carla Hall (warrior princess); Damiano Carrara (glam metal rocker); Sandra Lee (snow queen)
5	"Ginger Dead House"	October 31, 2016
	Preliminary Heat: Make creepy, decorated cookies to hang on a decorative "haunted" cookie tree in 2 hours. Winner: Tamara Brown (Her advantage is able to pick and assign themes in the second round) Main Heat: The final three contestants have six hours to create a haunted gingerbread house specific to a structural theme. For winning the pre-heat, Tamara picked "Gothic Castle" and assigned "Cabin in the Woods" to Veronica and "Asylum" to Michelle. Mid-round twist is to add a ginger and chocolate treat to complement their house. Winner of $25,000: Michelle Antonishek Eliminated: Tamara Brown and Veronica von Borstel	Judges' Costumes: Carla Hall (Bollywood star); Damiano Carrara (gladiator); Sandra Lee (Cher); Special Guest: Duff Goldman (tree creature)

=== Results ===
Contestant	1	2	3^{1}	4	5
Michelle	IN‡	IN	HIGH‡	WIN‡	WINNER
Tamara	LOW	WIN	WIN	LOW	OUT‡
Veronica	IN	IN	LOW	HIGH	OUT
John	IN	LOW‡	LOW	OUT	
Amy	WIN	HIGH	WDR		
Damien	HIGH	OUT			
Brad	OUT				

^Note 1: No one was eliminated at the end of Week 3.

(WINNER) The contestant won the whole competition.
‡ The contestant won the Pre-Heat challenge.
(WIN) The contestant won the Main Heat challenge.
(HIGH) The contestant had one of the best dishes for that week.
(IN) The contestant performed well enough to move on to the next week.
(LOW) The contestant had one of the bottom dishes for that week, but was not eliminated.
(OUT) The contestant was eliminated for worst dish.
(WDR) The contestant voluntarily left the competition.

== Season 3 (2017) ==
Eight bakers competed in a six-episode baking tournament. One person got eliminated every week until the final three compete for $25,000. Judges for this season are Carla Hall, Zac Young, and Lorraine Pascale.

=== Contestants ===
- 1st - Jasmin Bell, Pastry Instructor from Seattle, Washington
- 2nd - Jonathan Elias, Pastry Chef from Troy, Michigan
- 3rd - Jessica Scott, Executive Pastry Chef from San Diego, California
- 4th - Ray Vizcaino, Cake Decorator from San Diego, California
- 5th - Tyler Davis, Pastry Chef from St. Louis, Missouri
- 6th - Dina Melendez, Pastry Chef from Brooklyn, New York
- 7th - Cliff Butler, Pastry Chef from Austin, Texas
- 8th - Andrea Kratville, Home Baker from Sonora, California

=== Episodes ===
Ep. #	Title	Original Air Date
1	"Filled With Surprises"	September 25, 2017
	Preliminary Heat: Make one dozen cookies stuffed with candy in 90 minutes. Each contestant blindly picked a spooky theme written on a scarecrow's stick finger and incorporate it into their cookies. Winner: Ray Vizcaino (His advantage was first pick of pre-determined flavors of "slime" for the next round. He chose raspberry.) Main Heat: The contestants had to make a dessert filled with gooey "slime" in 2 hours. Mid-round twist is to create a little edible slime creature that lives in the dessert. Winner: Jasmin Bell Eliminated: Andrea Kratville	Judges' Costumes: Carla Hall (ghost bride); Zac Young (knight); Lorraine Pascale (witch)
2	"Bewitching Treats"	October 2, 2017
	Preliminary Heat: Bake 10 witch's fingers and toes in 1 hour and make a dipping sauce for the baked appendages. Winner: Jessica Scott (Her advantage was exclusive use of special witch stencils and pre-made fondant for the next round.) Main Heat: The contestants had to make witchy desserts in 90 minutes. Mid-round twist is to make an edible broom to accompany the witch confection. Winner: Tyler Davis Eliminated: Cliff Butler	Judges' Costumes: Carla Hall (Southern belle); Zac Young (vampire); Lorraine Pascale (Southern belle)
3	"It's All In Your Head"	October 9, 2017
	Preliminary Heat: The remaining six are paired into teams of two and must make two halves of an edible brain that fit together semleassly, all in 90 minutes. They pick prop brains from a table and matching numbers determines who's paired up with whom. (Teams are: Jasmin & Ray, Dina & Jessica, and Tyler & Jonathan). Winners: Jasmin Bell & Ray Vizcaino (Their advantage is not having to do the mid-round twist in the second round.) Main Heat: : In total darkness, the contestants must get to the table and grab a container with a common phobia inside. They have 90 minutes to make a dessert inspired by the fear they chose (Jessica got "rats", Tyler got "spiders", Jasmin got "clowns", Jonathan got "snakes", Dina got "ghosts", and Ray got "insects"). Mid-round twist is to add "Halloween worms" (cooked spaghetti) to their dessert. Winner: Jonathan Elias Eliminated: Dina Melendez	Judges' Costumes: Carla Hall (clown); Zac Young (matador); Lorraine Pascale (ringmaster)
4	"Sweet Screams"	October 16, 2017
	Preliminary Heat: Make a creepy, Halloween cream puff. Each contestant picked a dead rose that had a theme tagged to it, and had to use it as inspiration for their "scream" puffs. (Jasmin got "zombie", Jonathan got "bat", Tyler got "vampire", Ray got "mummy", and Jessica got "eyeball".) Winner: Jasmin Bell (Her advantage is a 10-minute head start.) Main Heat: The contestants have 80 minutes to make a dessert based on a scary mask on a display. (Jasmin grabbed a werewolf mask, Jonathan got a devil mask, Jessica got a raven mask, Ray got a snake mask, and Tyler got a Day of the Dead mask). Mid-round twist is to pick a wrapped up, unpopular Halloween treat (apples, popcorn balls, or raisins) and incorporate one into their dessert. Winner: Jessica Scott Eliminated: Tyler Davis	Judges' Costumes: Carla Hall (Day of the Dead lady); Zac Young (Grim Reaper); Lorraine Pascale (mummy)
5	"The Candyman Cometh"	October 23, 2017
	Preliminary Heat: Make a dessert that tastes like a candy bar in 90 minutes. Each contestant grabbed a jar filed with chocolate candies to use as inspiration. (Jonathan got chocolate coconut bars, Jasmin got chocolate peanut nougat bars, Ray got chocolate caramel cookie bars, and Jessica got peanut butter cups.) Winners: Jasmin Bell (Her advantage was going last in choosing odd chocolate pairings during the second round, and possibly stealing an ingredient duo from a fellow baker.) Main Heat: The contestants had to incorporate odd chocolate pairings into "death by chocolate" desserts in 90 minutes. The chocolate pairings were revealed by choosing between four portraits. Since Jasmin won the pre-heat, she got to see the ingredients her three competitors unveiled and could take one of their choices or risk what was behind the label of the final portrait. She opted not to take anyone's chocolate combination. (Jessica got chocolate and Gouda cheese, Ray got chocolate and jalapeño, Jonathan got chocolate and beer, and Jasmin got chocolate and fresh turmeric). Mid-round twist is to make an edible tombstone. Winner: Jasmin Bell Eliminated: Ray Vizcaino	Judges' Costumes: Carla Hall (Medusa); Zac Young (Napoleon); Lorraine Pascale (London Mod girl)
6	"Extreme Halloween"	October 30, 2017
	Preliminary Heat: Make two dozen batches of three different Halloween treats and create a glowing edible centerpiece for a dessert bar, all in 3 hours. Winner: Jasmin Bell (Her advantage is exclusive use of a cake flavor in the final round.) Main Heat: The final three contestants have 5 hours to create light-up jack o' lantern cakes. For winning the pre-heat, Jasmin got to choose the cake flavor she'll use for her light up cake, and the other contestants weren't allowed to use that flavor; she chose chocolate. Winner of $25,000: Jasmin Bell Eliminated: Jessica Scott and Jonathan Elias	Judges' Costumes: Carla Hall (Nefertiti); Zac Young (king); Lorraine Pascale (golden goddess)

=== Results ===
Contestant	1	2	3	4	5	6
Jasmin	WIN^{1}	IN	LOW‡	HIGH‡	WIN‡	WINNER‡
Jonathan	LOW	HIGH	WIN	IN	HIGH	OUT
Jessica	IN	IN‡	IN	WIN	LOW	OUT
Ray	IN‡	LOW	HIGH‡	LOW	OUT	
Tyler	IN	WIN	IN	OUT		
Dina	IN	IN	OUT			
Cliff	IN	OUT				
Andrea	OUT					

^Note 1: There were no top honors announced the first episode, just the winner and the bottom two.

(WINNER) The contestant won the whole competition.
‡ The contestant won the Pre-Heat challenge.
(WIN) The contestant won the Main Heat challenge.
(HIGH) The contestant had one of the best dishes for that week.
(IN) The contestant performed well enough to move on to the next week.
(LOW) The contestant had one of the bottom dishes for that week, but was not eliminated.
(OUT) The contestant was eliminated for worst dish.

== Season 4 (2018) ==
Eight bakers, professional and home cooks, competed in a six episode tournament. The winner got $25,000 and a spot in Food Network Magazine. The same judges as last year return: Carla Hall, Zac Young, and Lorraine Pascale.

=== Contestants ===
- 1st - Lyndsy McDonald, Executive Pastry Chef from Sarasota, Florida
- 2nd - Michelle Honeman, Home Baker from Beaverton, Oregon
- 3rd - Jamal Lake, Bakery Owner from West Palm Beach, Florida
- 4th - Steven Vargas Jr., Pastry Cook from Houston, Texas
- 5th - Brenda Villacorta, Pastry Chef from New York, New York
- 6th - Cicely Austin, University Executive Pastry Chef from Anderson, South Carolina
- 7th - Andrew Fuller, Home Bakery Owner from Des Moines, Iowa
- 8th - Brian Fishman, Bakery Owner from Long Island, New York

=== Episodes ===
Ep. #	Title	Original Air Date
1	"Hidden Halloween Horrors"	September 24, 2018
	Preliminary Heat: Make a spider web dessert in 2 hours, and choose a creature to trap inside the web confection. Andrew got 'snake'. Jamal got 'scorpion'. Michelle got 'frog', Brian got 'centipede'. Brenda got 'cockroach'. Steven got 'raven'. Lyndsy got 'dragonfly'. Cicely got 'bat'. Winner: Steven Vargas Jr. (His advantage was pre-tempered chocolate going into the main heat.) Main Heat: The bakers had 2 hours to create a dessert with a shell over it, so when it melts it reveals something creepy inside. The "something creepy" was determined by choosing blocks of ice that had something hidden inside. Lyndsy got 'bug eggs'. Brenda got 'tombstone'. Andrew got 'worms'. Cicely got 'brains'. Brian got 'skull'. Jamal got 'fingers'. Michelle got 'heart'. Steven got 'eyeball'. Mid-round twist is to add cayenne pepper to their dessert. Winner: Lyndsy McDonald Eliminated: Brian Fishman	Judges' Costumes: Carla Hall (neon hippie); Zac Young (garden gnome); Lorraine Pascale (zombie priestess)
2	"Fall Forward Desserts"	October 1, 2018
	Preliminary Heat: Make yam desserts that evoke scary movie cliches, as picked from tagged yams. They had 90 minutes but weren't allowed to make pies. Andrew grabbed "bloody knife", Michelle grabbed "claw hand", Jamal grabbed "scarred face", Cicely grabbed "masked man", Steven grabbed "creepy doll", Lyndsy grabbed "chainsaw", Brenda grabbed "hockey mask". Winner: Jamal Lake (His advantage was first choice of cake flavor in the second round.) Main Heat: The bakers must create a pumpkin patch out of mini bundt cakes, in 90 minutes. Jamal's advantage was getting to choose a cake flavor that no other baker could use and he chose vanilla. Brenda's flavor was pumpkin. Lyndsy's flavor was spice cake. Steven's flavor was maple. Cicely's flavor was chocolate. Michelle's flavor was apple. And Andrew's flavor was ginger. Mid-round twist is to add an edible scarecrow. Winner: Lyndsy McDonald Eliminated: Andrew Fuller	Judges' Costumes: Carla Hall (Robyn Hood); Zac Young (Mozart's ghost); Lorraine Pascale (woodland fairy)
3	"Monster Mania"	October 8, 2018
	Preliminary Heat: Working together, the bakers had 90 minutes to make different pâté à choux body parts that form one large, edible monster. Steven had to make the tail. Michelle had to make the horned head. Lyndsy had to make the arms. Jamal had to make the wings. Brenda had to make the scaly torso. Cicely had to make the legs. Winner: Jamal Lake (His advantage was first choice of dessert and theme in the next round.) Main Heat: The bakers had 90 minutes to combine a type of dessert and a theme into a large, "monster-sized" confection. Jamal chose first: 'whoopie pie' and 'grave digger'. Brenda got 'cupcake' and 'demon'. Cecily got 'roll cake' and 'alien'. Michelle got 'cream puff' and 'freakshow'. Steven got 'pie' and 'jack-o-lantern'. Lyndsy got 'doughnut' and 'mad scientist'. Mid-round twist is to add sesame seeds into their desserts. Winner: Jamal Lake Eliminated: Cicely Austin	Judges' Costumes: Carla Hall (vintage ghost); Zac Young (life guard); Lorraine Pascale (Viking warrior)
4	"Hallowedding"	October 15, 2018
	Preliminary Heat: Make a dozen petit fours for a Halloween wedding shower in 90 minutes. Each baker grabbed a wine glass with a monster-bride theme. Steven got 'werewolf'. Jamal got 'vampire'. Lyndsy got 'skeleton'. Michelle got 'witch'. Brenda got 'zombie'. Winner: Jamal Lake (His advantage was 10 minutes of help from Zac Young.) Main Heat: The bakers had 2 hours to make a wedding cake for different monster pairings. Michelle got the 'skeleton & robot' couple. Lyndsy got the 'witch & goblin'. Jamal got the 'zombie & ghost'. Brenda got the 'vampire & troll'. Steven got the 'werewolf & mummy'. Mid-round twist is to add a special, flowery gift bag ingredient. Michelle had to add rosemary. Lyndsy had to add orange blossom water. Steven had to add elderflower. Jamal had to add lavender. Brenda had to add rose water. Winner: Steven Vargas Jr Eliminated: Brenda Villacorta	Judges' Costumes: Carla Hall (spirit animal); Zac Young (cupcake); Lorraine Pascale (ghost queen)
5	"Circus of Dread"	October 22, 2018
	Preliminary Heat: Make a dessert in 90 minutes with a theme and flavor picked blindly from tarot cards. Jamal had 'The Fool' and 'blood orange'. Lyndsy had 'The Hermit' and 'fig'. Steven had 'Death' and 'passion fruit'. Michelle had 'The Magician' and 'clove'. Winner: Michelle Honeman (Her advantage was assigning specially themed clowns to everyone in the second round.) Main Heat: The bakers have 2 hours to bake a creepy clown dessert. Michelle chose "Fiery Freddy" (the torch juggler). She gave "Clumsy Carl" (who slips on banana peels) to Lyndsy. "Helium Hank" (the balloon animal maker) to Steven. And "One Wheeled Willie" (the unicycle rider) to Jamal. Mid-round twist is to deep fry one of four food items and add it to their dessert. Lyndsy had to fry peanut nougat bars. Michelle had to fry cheese curds. Jamal had to fry sandwich cookies. and Steven had to fry bacon. Winner: Lyndsy McDonald Eliminated: Steven Vargas Jr.	Judges' Costumes: Carla Hall (gumball machine); Zac Young (ice skater); Lorraine Pascale (Queen of Hearts)
6	"Cranium Epicurean"	October 29, 2018
	Preliminary Heat: Make skull desserts in two hours. Winner: Michelle Honeman (Her advantage was assigning the nightmare themes in the final round.) Main Heat: The final three contestants had 5 hours to make cakes inspired by common nightmare scenarios. Michelle chose "being visited by the dead". She assigned "falling" to Lyndsy, and "getting chased" to Jamal. They also had to include a smoke element via dry ice. Winner of $25,000: Lyndsy McDonald Eliminated: Jamal Lake and Michelle Honeman	Judges' Costumes: Carla Hall (80s pop star); Zac Young (unicorn); Lorraine Pascale (dreamy genie)

=== Results ===
Contestant	1	2^{1}	3	4	5	6
Lyndsy	WIN	WIN	IN	HIGH	WIN	WINNER
Michelle	HIGH	IN	IN	HIGH	LOW‡	OUT‡
Jamal	IN	LOW‡	WIN‡	LOW‡	IN	OUT
Steven	IN‡	IN	LOW	WIN	OUT	
Brenda	IN	IN	IN	OUT		
Cicely	IN	IN	OUT			
Andrew	LOW	OUT				
Brian	OUT					

^Note 1: There were no "best dishes" announced the second and third episodes, just the winner and the bottom two.

(WINNER) The contestant won the whole competition.
‡ The contestant won the Pre-Heat challenge.
(WIN) The contestant won the Main Heat challenge.
(HIGH) The contestant had one of the best dishes for that week.
(IN) The contestant performed well enough to move on to the next week.
(LOW) The contestant had one of the bottom dishes for that week, but was not eliminated.
(OUT) The contestant was eliminated for worst dish.

== Season 5 (2019) ==
=== Contestants ===
- 1st - Karl Fong, Bakery Owner from Hercules, California
- 2nd - Jessica Brockway, Bakery Owner from Seattle, Washington
- 3rd - Pete Tidwell, Bakery Owner from Provo, Utah
- 4th - Julie Montgomery, Pastry Instructor from Toronto, Canada
- 5th - Jocelyn Jung, Bakery Owner from San Diego, California
- 6th - Sheldon Taylor-Timothy, Home Baker from Toronto, Canada
- 7th - Brittany Lombardi, Pastry Cook from The Bronx, New York
- 8th - Jess Eddy, Bakery Owner from Hartland, Wisconsin

=== Episodes ===
Episodes
No. in season	Title	Original release date
1	"Halloween Invasion"	September 23, 2019
Preliminary Heat: The contestants were asked to make skeleton-inspired sweets that illustrated a story about their skeleton's "dark secret". Winner: Karl won; his advantage in the Main Heat was first choice of monster type. Main Heat: The contestants had 2 hours to create a dessert shaped like the monster under the bed. Twist: They had to make pillowy marshmallow cream from scratch and incorporate it into the dessert. Winner: Jessica Eliminated: Jess
2	"Smells Like Halloween Spirit"	September 30, 2019
Preliminary Heat: Contestants created desserts based on a randomly selected bottle of spirits (such as orange liqueur) and the spirit guide on its label (such as an angel or mythical creature). Winner: Julie won; her advantage was first choice of "dead" dessert in the Main Heat. Main Heat: The contestants each picked a "dead" old dessert. Their challenge was to revive and modernize their dessert and decorate it in a Day of the Dead style, in 2 hours. Twist: Contestants had to create 3D edible flowers and incorporate them into their dessert. Winner: Pete Eliminated: Brittany
3	"All Things Weird and Wonderful"	October 7, 2019
Preliminary Heat: In a promotion for the animated film The Addams Family, the bakers were paired in teams to create one cohesive dessert featuring jackfruit that was scary on the outside but sweet on the inside, like the members of the Addams family themselves. The partners were: Julie & Jocelyn, Jessica & Pete and Sheldon & Karl. Winner: Karl & Sheldon won the advantage to choose characters last in the Main Heat. They had the option to trade characters with those who did not win. Main Heat: Each contestant chose a door, revealing an Addams Family character. The selected characters were: Julie: Pugsly, Jocelyn: Grandma, Jessica: Gomez, Pete: Morticia, Karl: Uncle Fester, Sheldon: Wednesday. The bakers were asked to create a "dead velvet" cake that looked like their character, with a coloring randomly picked from options in an urn. Twist: The bakers had to incorporate either a snake, eyeball, or spider snack into the dessert. Winner: Julie Eliminated: Sheldon
4	"Creepy and Crusty Creations"	October 14, 2019
Preliminary Heat: Contestants had 90 minutes to create a mummy-themed creepy crepe cake, and incorporate a preservative ingredient. Winner: Pete won. He had first choice of ingredient in the Main Heat and picked cream cheese. Main Heat: The contestants were asked to make their very best pumpkin pie and decorate it with a face that had a scary half and a sweet half. Additionally they were given a classic fall ingredient such as raisins, dulce de leche, cream cheese, cranberries, or pomegranates. Baking time was 2 hours. Twist: The bakers had to include pumpkin seeds, received raw. Winner: Karl Eliminated: Jocelyn
5	"Gravely Delicious Desserts"	October 21, 2019
Preliminary Heat: Each contestant dug up a grave to get an underground ingredient: sweet potato, carrot, beets, or fennel. They had 90 minutes to make graverobbing-themed desserts. Winner: Julie won; she got first choice of flavor in the Main Heat. She picked maple. Main Heat: The bakers had 2 hours to make a tomb-shaped marble cake that was marbled inside and out and included a required flavor: maple, ginger, cinnamon, or cardamom. Twist: The bakers chose obituary cards and had to customize their cake to the person described. Peter: Plumber, Karl: Archeologist, Jessica: Mortician, Julie: Chemist who blew himself up in a lab. Winner: Pete Eliminated: Julie
6	TBA	October 27, 2019
Preliminary Heat: The bakers had 3 hours to make a "ghostembouche", a ghostly croquembouche. Winner: Peter won. In the Main Heat, he could choose his "bleeding" body part, as well as choose for the other two contestants. Main Heat: The final three contestants had 5 hours to create a zombie cake. The cake was required to have a bleeding effect that happened during judging: a bleeding heart, a hemorrhaging brain, or eyes that seep blood. Pete picked the brain and gave Karl the heart and Jessica the eyes. Winner of $25,000: Karl Eliminated: Jessica & Pete

=== Judges' Costumes ===
- Episode 1: Carla Hall as a chef who survived a lobster attack, Zac Young as the big, bad wolf disguised as granny, Katie Lee as Captain Judgmental
- Episode 2: Carla Hall as Mother Earth, Zac Young as a pink flamingo, Katie Lee as a pop art painting
- Episode 3: Carla Hall as Morticia Addams, Zac Young as Uncle Fester, Katie Lee as Wednesday Addams
- Episode 4: Carla Hall as ghost reporter, Zac Young as Liza Minnelli, Katie Lee as injured influencer
- Episode 5: Carla Hall as the Ice Queen, Zac Young as a romance novel hunk, Katie Lee as vampire nanny (Scary Poppins)
- Episode 6: Carla Hall as a shower poof (loofah), Zac Young as croquembouche, Katie Lee as candy corn

=== Results ===
Contestant	1	2	3	4	5	6
Karl	IN‡	HIGH	HIGH‡	WIN	HIGH	WINNER
Jessica	WIN	IN	LOW	HIGH	LOW	OUT
Pete	IN	WIN	IN	LOW‡	WIN	OUT‡
Julie	IN	IN‡	WIN	IN	OUT‡	
Jocelyn	HIGH	IN	IN	OUT		
Sheldon	IN	LOW	OUT‡			
Brittany	LOW	OUT				
Jess	OUT					

(WINNER) The contestant won the whole competition.
‡ The contestant won the Pre-Heat challenge.
(WIN) The contestant won the Main Heat challenge.
(HIGH) The contestant had one of the best dishes for that week.
(IN) The contestant performed well enough to move on to the next week.
(LOW) The contestant had one of the bottom dishes for that week, but was not eliminated.
(OUT) The contestant was eliminated for worst dish.

== Season 6 (2020) ==
Season 6 is themed around a haunted house. Carla Hall acts as both a judge and the host, leading the contestants on a tour of a different themed room in each episode. Unlike other seasons, the first six episodes of this season each contained only one challenge.

=== Contestants ===
- 1st - Sinai Vespie, Pastry Chef from Mishawaka, Indiana
- 2nd - Renee Loranger, Pastry Chef from Waveland, Mississippi
- 3rd - Aaron Clouse, Pastry Chef from Columbus, Ohio
- 4th - Michelle Lee, Sous Chef from Monterey, California
- 5th - Michael Gaddy, Pastry Chef from Dade City, Florida
- 6th - Brian Bosch, Event Designer from Santa Ana, California
- 7th - Tamara Brown, from Los Angeles, California
- 8th - Holly Braddock, Pastry Chef from Myrtle Beach, South Carolina
- 9th - Nerwan Khalife, Pastry Chef from Bronx, New York
- 10th - Edward Cunningham, Railroad Heavy Equipment Operator from Chicago, Illinois

=== Episodes ===
Episodes
No. in season	Title	Original release date
1	"House of Haunts"	September 14, 2020
Main Heat: In the grand foyer of the haunted house, host Carla Hall asked the 10 competitors to bake haunted house cakes that revealed their deepest fears. Treat: The competitors had to incorporate balsamic vinegar to their cakes. Trick: The competitors had to add a working door to their haunted house. Mini-game: There were 10 fake daggers hidden throughout the kitchen. Whoever found the most daggers by the end of the bake won a special prize. Brian won the reward: a Time Dagger which gives 5 extra minutes for any bake. Main Heat Winner: Renee Eliminated: Edward
2	"Sweet Illusions"	September 21, 2020
Main Heat: On the haunted house's front porch, the 9 competitors were asked to make Halloween candy croquembouche illusions. The task was to create the illusion of Halloween candies spilling onto a croquembouche tower. Additionally, they were each given a bag with the candy they needed to use and their theme. Treat: The contestants had to use canned pumpkin somewhere in the croquembouche. Trick: Add a 3D edible fence or railing to surround the croquembouche. Winner: Aaron Eliminated: Nerwan
3	"Bloody Good Smorgasbord"	September 28, 2020
Main Heat: In the spooky cellar, bakers were assigned in teams of two. Each team member was responsible for creating three different vampire-themed baked goods to form a cohesive vampire buffet in three hours. Team W: Renee and Aaron, Team X: Tamara and Michael, Team Y: Holly and Brian, Team Z: Michelle and Sinai Treat: Each baker had to incorporate (naturally sweet) black garlic in one of their desserts. Trick: Each team had to bake an edible coffin in which to display some of their desserts. Winner: Sinai and Michelle Eliminated: Holly
4	"Ashes, Ashes, We All Fall Down"	October 5, 2020
Main Heat: In the creepy nursery, bakers were challenged to make a 3D demon doll cake in three hours. Treat: Contestants had to run and grab a jar of baby food from Carla, that then had to be incorporated into the cake so the judges could actually taste it. Trick: Contestants had to make an accessory: baby shoes, blanket, bib, brush, bow, bowtie, or silver spoon. Winner: Renee Eliminated: Tamara
5	"The Devil Made Me Do It"	October 12, 2020
Main Heat: In the Devil's Den, contestants had to make desserts decorated like the devil himself. Each baker had to use one of the devil's favorite ingredients: sauerkraut, beets, tamarind, spinach, Parmesan cheese, or canned tomato soup. Treat: The bakers had to incorporate Fresno chiles somewhere in the dessert. Trick: The bakers had to include a fire element in the dessert. Winner: Aaron Eliminated: Brian
6	"The Costume Ball"	October 19, 2020
Main Heat: In the haunted ballroom, the competitors were asked to bake a costume cake based on an outfit which they assembled from a variety of costume pieces. Treat: The bakers had to incorporate rum into their cake. Trick: The bakers had to add an edible jewelry decoration. Winner: Renee Eliminated: Michael
7	"The Doctor Will See You Now"	October 26, 2020
Pre-Heat: In the mad doctor's surgery room, the four remaining bakers were asked to create a realistic severed limb cake. Aaron and Renee had the best cakes, leaving Sinai and Michelle to compete in a Sudden Death elimination challenge. Sudden Death Challenge: Sinai (with Renee as sous chef) and Michelle (with Aaron as sous chef) had make a goblin-themed dessert. Sinai was not allowed to use wheat flour, while Michelle was not allowed to use eggs. Sinai won the challenge, and Michelle was eliminated. Main Heat: In the séance room, the bakers were asked to make floating cakes, each themed around a different ghost who had met a grisly demise. Treat: The bakers had to crack open and use whole coconuts. Trick: The bakers had to add an edible In Memoriam card to their cake. Winner: Sinai

=== Judges' Costumes ===
- Episode 1: Carla Hall as Halloween Baking Bubbly (bottle of champagne), Zac Young as a spooky ballerina, Stephanie Boswell as Cereal Killer
- Episode 2: Carla Hall as Tough Cookie (50s rebel gal with a cookie theme), Zac Young as a Woodland Elf, Stephanie Boswell as Sasquatch Supermodel
- Episode 3: Carla Hall as a Vampire CEO, Zac Young as a Vegas vampire, Stephanie Boswell as a Vampire Sorority Girl
- Episode 4: Carla Hall as Baaaddd Bat, Zac Young as Cool Cat, Stephanie Boswell as Fierce Falcon
- Episode 5: Carla Hall as Halloween Devil Diva, Zac Young as Dastardly Devil, Stephanie Boswell as Devil Bride
- Episode 6: Carla Hall as Glamorous Octopus, Zac Young as Dr. Jekyll and Mr. Hyde, Stephanie Boswell as Pirate Captain
- Episode 7: Carla Hall as Miss Universe, Zac Young as Liberace's ghost, Stephanie Boswell as Queen of the Underworld

=== Results ===
Contestant	1	2	3	4	5	6	7	
Sinai	IN	LOW	WIN	IN	HIGH	IN	LOW	WINNER
Renee	WIN	IN	IN	WIN	HIGH	WIN	IN	OUT
Aaron	IN	WIN	IN	LOW	WIN	IN	IN	OUT
Michelle	IN	IN	HIGH	HIGH	LOW	LOW	OUT	
Michael	IN	HIGH	IN	IN	LOW	OUT		
Brian	LOW	IN	LOW	IN	OUT			
Tamara	IN	IN	IN	OUT				
Holly	HIGH	IN	OUT					
Nerwan	IN	OUT						
Edward	OUT							

(WINNER) The contestant won the whole competition.
(WIN) The contestant won the Main Heat challenge.
(HIGH) The contestant had one of the best dishes for that week.
(IN) The contestant performed well enough to move on to the next week.
(LOW) The contestant had one of the bottom dishes for that week, but was not eliminated.
(OUT) The contestant was eliminated for worst dish.

== Season 7 (2021) ==
Season 7 is themed around "Camp Devil's Food Lake" inspired by slasher films of the 1980s, with host John Henson portraying the summer camp's head counselor.

=== Contestants ===
- 1st - Renee Loranger (Note: Renee, a fan favorite from season 6, was brought back to the show on episode 2.), Pastry Chef from Waveland, Mississippi
- 2nd - Guillermo Salinas from Jackson, Mississippi
- 2nd - Adina Schaefer, Executive Pastry Chef from Los Angeles, California
- 4th - Megan Baker, Bakery Owner from Minneapolis, Minnesota
- 5th - Ashley Wong from Fremont, California
- 6th - Wes Dills from Austin, Texas
- 7th - Sherelle Morrison from Indian Land, South Carolina
- 8th - Jocelyn Jung (Note: Jocelyn, a fan favorite from season 5, was brought back to the show on episode 2.), Bakery Owner from San Diego, California
- 9th (Note: Nicole and Anirudh were both eliminated after a Sudden Death round) - Anirudh Mamtora from Cherry Hill, New Jersey
- 9th - Nicole Proske from Miami, Florida
- 11th - Steven Sechoka from Boston, Massachusetts
- 12th - Paul Allicock from Miami, Florida

=== Episodes ===
Episodes
No. in season	Title	Original release date
1	"Welcome to Camp Devil's Food Lake"	September 13, 2021
The Thriller: John asked the bakers to make a "cereal killer" pie featuring the camp's serial killer. Each baker chose a breakfast cereal as a required ingredient. Winner: Nicole won, earning the advantage to swap her required ingredient with another competitor's in the next challenge. Eliminated: Paul The Killer: The bakers had to make large cakes at least 10 inches (25 cm) tall depicting "what lies beneath the lake." They were also randomly assigned a blood-red ingredient. Winner: Adina Eliminated: Steven
2	"Back From the Dead"	September 20, 2021
John resurrected two past contestants to enter the competition: Jocelyn Jung from season five and Renee Loranger from season six. The Thriller: In teams of two, the bakers made cookies with a surprise filling, themed around a care package from a monstrous "mommy". Winners: Jocelyn and Renee. They gained the advantage to re-assign their opponents' teams in the next challenge. The Killer: The bakers made a cake portrait of the killer's mother, including meringue and a featured spice. The teams of two separately made halves of the portrait, depicting a light and dark side. Winners: Megan and Sherelle Sudden Death: The bottom two teams (Anirudh, Ashley, Adina, and Nicole) had to make "severed hand" hand pies with preserved meat as the featured ingredient. Judged individually, the two lowest ranked bakers were eliminated. Eliminated: Anirudh and Nicole
3	"Bat in Black"	September 27, 2021
The Thriller: The bakers made pull-apart cupcakes themed around dismembered body parts. Winner: Megan won; her advantage was to delay her opponents by forcing them to "trick-or-treat" with John. The Killer: The bakers made bat-themed Battenberg cakes with randomly assigned black-colored ingredients. Winner: Megan and Adina (tie) Eliminated: Jocelyn
4	"Don't B-Negative"	October 4, 2021
The Thriller: The bakers were asked to make "terror-misu", non-traditional tiramisu with ladyfingers that looked like fingers. Winner: Renee won; her advantage was to pick the candy of her choice in the next challenge. The Killer: The bakers made blood drip cakes with a flavor profile inspired by blindly picked Halloween candy. Winner: Guillermo Eliminated: Sherelle
5	"Dance Your Life Away"	October 11, 2021
The Thriller: To celebrate prom night at camp, bakers were asked to create a dozen deadly doughnuts with an added baked element. Winner: Guillermo won; his advantage was a second chance to choose a flavor profile in the next challenge. The Killer: Reenacting the blood-soaked prom scene in Carrie, John asked the bakers to make a tsunami cake: a cake with a reservoir of liquid frosting that would cascade when released. It also had to contain flavors from a blindly picked dessert. Winner: Ashley Eliminated: Wes
6	"Peek-A-Boo"	October 18, 2021
The Thriller: The bakers were tasked to make patterned roll cakes that included chocolate. Winner: Adina won. Her advantage was the first pick of liquor in the next challenge. The Killer: The bakers made fault line cakes that illustrated the evil inside the camp killer. They were also required to incorporate a flavored liquor. Winner: Guillermo Eliminated: Ashley
7	"Finale: The Killer Is..."	October 25, 2021
The Thriller: The bakers had 90 minutes to create a dessert inspired by campfire smores. They had to use an ingredient they most feared baking with: Renee had sauerkraut, Megan had black garlic, Adina had rosemary, and Guillermo had gelatin desserts. Winner: Adina won; her advantage in the Killer challenge was exclusive use of a filling: mousse, curd, or jelly. Sudden Death: As the lowest ranked in the Thriller challenge, Megan and Guillermo entered an elimination bake-off. They had to make pumpkin desserts with a fresh, modern flavor but the appearance of a rotten pumpkin. Eliminated: Megan The Killer: In the final challenge, bakers had five hours to make a tiered or carved cake at least 24 inches (61 cm) high depicting the mind of the killer. It had to be topped with a gooey brain tasting element. Winner: Renee

=== Judges' Costumes ===
- Episode 1: Carla Hall as a bloody victim, Zac Young as Chucky, Stephanie Boswell as the final girl
- Episode 2: Carla Hall and Stephanie Boswell as terrifying twins (inspired by the Grady Twins from The Shining), Zac Young as an archaeologist (inspired by Indiana Jones)
- Episode 3: Carla Hall as an evil cheerleader, Zac Young as a vampire glam rock star, Stephanie Boswell as Mistress of the Dark (inspired by Elvira)
- Episode 4: Carla Hall as an undead fitness instructor, Zac Young as a voodoo doll, Stephanie Boswell as goblin king (inspired by Jareth from the 1986 movie Labyrinth)
- Episode 5: Carla Hall as dancing queen who only made it to seventeen, Zac Young as tuxedo wolfman, Stephanie Boswell as bloody prom queen (inspired by Carrie White)
- Episode 6: Carla Hall as deadly disco queen, Zac Young as vicious poodle, Stephanie Boswell as creepy clown
- Episode 7: Carla Hall as cat lady, Zac Young as devilish boss, Stephanie Boswell as Dollface

=== Results ===
Contestant	1	2	3	4	5	6	7	
Renee		‡IN	IN	‡HIGH	LOW	IN	IN	WINNER
Guillermo	LOW	HIGH	HIGH	WIN	‡IN	WIN	LOW	OUT
Adina	WIN	LOW	WIN	IN	HIGH	‡LOW	‡IN	OUT
Megan	LOW	WIN	‡WIN	IN	IN	IN	OUT	
Ashley	HIGH	LOW	IN	IN	WIN	OUT		
Wes	IN	HIGH	LOW	LOW	OUT			
Sherelle	IN	WIN	LOW	OUT				
Jocelyn		‡IN	OUT					
Anirudh	IN	OUT						
Nicole	‡IN	OUT						
Steven	OUT							
Paul	OUT							

(WINNER) The contestant won the whole competition.
(WIN) The contestant won "The Killer" (Main Heat challenge).
(HIGH) The contestant had one of the best dishes for that week.
(IN) The contestant performed well enough to move on to the next week.
(LOW) The contestant competed in a Sudden Death round, but was not eliminated.
(LOW) The contestant had one of the bottom dishes for that week, but was not eliminated.
(OUT) The contestant competed in a Sudden Death round and was eliminated for the worst dish.
(OUT) The contestant was eliminated for worst dish.
‡The contestant won "The Thriller" (Preheat challenge)

== Season 8 (2022) ==
Season 8 is themed around "Hotel Henson" with host John Henson acting as the innkeeper of a sinister hotel.

=== Contestants ===
- 1st - Blayre Wright, Bakery Owner from Lancaster, Pennsylavania
- 2/3/4th - Zac Mercer, Bakery Owner from Denver, Colorado
- 2/3/4th - Lauren Rodgers, Bakery Owner from Olympia, Washington
- 2/3/4th - Jill Davis, Bakery Owner from Owosso, Michigan
- 5th - Kristi Descher, Pastry Chef from Valencia, California
- 6th - Alexey Ivanov, Home Baker from Brooklyn, New York
- 7th - Lola Forbes, Bakery Co-Owner from Mesa, Arizona
- 8th - Maricsa Trejo, Bakery Owner from Richardson, Texas
- 9th - Justin Dominguez, Bakery Owner and Cake Artist from San Antonio, Texas
- 9th - Margarita Garcia, Pastry Chef from Miami, Florida
- 11th - Marcus Brackett, Self-Taught Baker from Rockville, Maryland
- 12th - AJ DeDiego, Home Baker from Atlanta, Georgia

=== Episodes ===
Episodes
No. in season	Title	Original release date
1	"Welcome to Hotel Henson"	September 12, 2022
The Thriller: John introduced his hotel's bellhop service, giving competitors suitcases containing body parts. The bakers were asked to make a pie topped with a human face to match the body part they found. Winner: Maricsa won the advantage of first and exclusive choice of bloodstain pattern in the next challenge. The Killer: Inspired by the hotel's former maid and her encounter with a bloody bathroom, the bakers had to make a sponge cake with at least four layers and decorated with an assigned bloodstain pattern. Winner: Lauren Eliminated: AJ
2	"Croquem-boots"	September 19, 2022
The Thriller: In a promotion for the film Puss in Boots: The Last Wish, John asked the bakers to make a "croquem-boot," a croquembouche shaped like a boot. Each baker was assigned a type of flavored cream to use in their filling. Winner: Blayre won and got first pick of chocolate in the Killer challenge. Marcus was the lowest ranked and was sent to a sudden death bake-off. The Killer: Inspired by the hotel's former pastry chef, John asked the bakers to make a "Death by Chocolate" sachertorte themed around a cause of death. Each baker had to use a particular variety of chocolate. Winner: Lauren won the challenge. Jill was the lowest ranked and was sent to a sudden death bake-off. Sudden Death Challenge: Marcus and Jill were asked to make cupcakes themed around the judges' costumes and their "last wish" desserts that they would want with a last meal. Marcus chose Stephanie (mint chocolate chip sundae and Pizza Rat costume); Jill chose Carla (lemon meringue pie and fortune teller costume). Eliminated: Marcus
3	"Maze Madness"	September 26, 2022
The Thriller: In a challenge themed around the hotel's former gardeners and their creepy hedge maze, the bakers were randomly paired in teams and given four hours to create a 3D hedge maze cake. In a twist, the bakers had to add fresh herbs into the cake. Winner: Jill and Kristi won the Thriller challenge and were safe from elimination. The Killer: The bakers were asked to create a dessert representing a prize in the center of the maze. This was an individual challenge which occurred concurrently with the team challenge. Eliminated: Justin and Margarita. The two bakers who ranked lowest in the Killer challenge were eliminated. They were judged individually and were not on the same team.
4	"Spoiled Rotten by Axe-ident"	October 3, 2022
The Thriller: Inspired by the hotel's room service, John asked the bakers to make a dessert that resembled rotten food. The bakers had to feature a fermented ingredient: yogurt, kefir, pickled strawberries, balsamic vinegar, miso, soy sauce, kombucha, or sauerkraut. Winner: Maricsa won and gained ten extra minutes in the Killer challenge. The Killer: Inspired by the hotel's former caretaker (who liked to smash holes in doors), the bakers were asked to make smashable desserts with an outer shell and a surprise inside. Winner: Alexey Eliminated: Maricsa
5	"FlamBakers and Open Wounds"	October 10, 2022
The Thriller: Inspired by a suspicious fire in the hotel, the competitors were asked to make a flaming dish using the flavors of classic flambé desserts. Winner: Zac won the challenge. His advantage was first pick of the twist ingredient in the next challenge. The Killer: Inspired by a mad doctor who once resided in the hotel, the bakers were tasked with baking a cake that looked like an open wound. In a twist, the bakers had to add cured meat to their dessert. Winner: Blayre Eliminated: Lola
6	"Eyes on the Prize"	October 17, 2022
The Thriller: Inspired by portraits with moving eyes, the bakers were asked to make eyeball upside-down cakes. Pineapple was not allowed. Winner: Alexey won, gaining the advantage to choose the teams in the next challenge. The Killer: The bakers had to make cakes themed around the ghostly twin girls who haunt Room 222. Paired in teams of two, each baker's cake had to be visually identical to their teammate's, but with different flavors. In a twist, teams had to incorporate classic flavor combo ingredients. Winner: Blayre and Kristi Eliminated: Alexey
7	"We've Got Spirit!"	October 24, 2022
The Thriller: Inspired by the hotel's former barkeeper, the bakers had to make a boozy eclair with the flavors of a "scary" cocktail: dark and stormy, skeleton key, last word, widow's kiss, or zombie. Winner: Lauren won, earning first choice of the twist ingredients in the next challenge. The Killer: The bakers were tasked with making a trio of mirror glazed entremets, a layered dessert of jellies, mousse, and cake. The entremets had to depict the baker's worst nightmare. In a twist, bakers had to incorporate old Halloween candies into their dessert. Winner: Jill Eliminated: Kristi
8	"Cheers to the Newlydeads!"	October 31, 2022
The Thriller: Inspired by a deadly wedding, the bakers were asked to create two grazing board items, one sweet and the other savory. The items had to be themed around the head and heart, and each competitor was given a type of cheese as a featured ingredient. Although this was initially presented as an elimination challenge, the judges decided not to send anyone home because all the competitors performed well. No advantage was awarded. The Killer: In the final challenge, the bakers were given five hours to make a black wedding cake for a dead bride and groom. They were randomly assigned a theme: gothic, antique, masquerade ball, or roaring twenties. Winner: Blayre

=== Judges' Costumes ===
- Episode 1: Carla Hall as a ghostly mother (inspired by Mrs. Bates from Psycho), Zac Young as a bubble bath guest, Stephanie Boswell as a bloody bathroom guest
- Episode 2: Carla Hall as a fortune teller, Zac Young as a milk delivery man, Stephanie Boswell as Pizza Rat
- Episode 3: Carla Hall as a bloody hedge maze trimmer, Zac Young as a decorative shrub, Stephanie Boswell as a frozen 1920s flapper
- Episode 4: Carla Hall as a zombie doll, Zac Young as Bob Ross, Stephanie Boswell as De-Mona Lisa
- Episode 5: Carla Hall as a wounded patient, Zac Young as a handcuffed prisoner, Stephanie Boswell as a doctor
- Episode 6: Carla Hall, Zac Young, and Stephanie Boswell as triplets (inspired by the Grady Twins)
- Episode 7: Carla Hall as a bloody bartender, Zac Young as a headless bellhop, Stephanie Boswell as a bloody maid
- Episode 8: Carla Hall as a skeleton in a glittery tuxedo, Zac Young as a flower girl, Stephanie Boswell as Skeleton bride

=== Results ===
Contestant	1	2	3	4	5	6	7	8
Blayre	IN	‡IN	IN	IN	WIN	WIN	LOW	WINNER
Zac	IN	HIGH	IN	IN	‡IN	IN	IN	OUT
Lauren	WIN	WIN	IN	LOW	IN	IN	‡IN	OUT
Jill	IN	LOW	WIN	IN	IN	LOW	WIN	OUT
Kristi	IN	IN	WIN	IN	HIGH	WIN	OUT	
Alexey	IN	IN	LOW	WIN	LOW	‡OUT		
Lola	HIGH	IN	IN	IN	OUT			
Maricsa	‡IN	IN	IN	‡OUT				
Justin	IN	LOW	OUT					
Margarita	LOW	IN	OUT					
Marcus	IN	OUT						
AJ	OUT							

(WINNER) The contestant won the whole competition.
(WIN) The contestant won "The Killer" (Main Heat challenge).
(HIGH) The contestant had one of the best dishes for that week.
(IN) The contestant performed well enough to move on to the next week.
(LOW) The contestant competed in a Bake Off, but was not eliminated.
(LOW) The contestant had one of the bottom dishes for that week, but was not eliminated.
(OUT) The contestant competed in a Bake Off and was eliminated for the worst dish.
(OUT) The contestant was eliminated for worst dish.
‡The contestant won "The Thriller" (Preheat challenge)

== Season 9 (2023) ==
In season 9, host John Henson portrays the heir of the abandoned "Henson & Sons Carnival" where he presents baking challenges themed around the grisly deaths of his circus performer relatives.

=== Contestants ===
- 1st-Hollie Fraser, Bakery Owner from Port Moody, British Columbia
- 2/3rd-James Cox, Bakery Owner and Pastry Chef from Chicago, Illinois
- 2/3rd-Ryan McCord, Pastry Chef from Nashville, Tennessee
- 4th-Stacy Day, Pastry Chef from Nashville, Tennessee
- 5th-Christa Aylward, Bakery Owner from Dublin, Ohio
- 6th-Mandi Del Toro, Home Baker from San Antonio, Texas
- 7/8th-Shefali Patel, Home Baker from Coppell, Texas
- 7/8th-Dan Pivovar, Pastry Chef from Onalaska, Wisconsin
- 9th-Adesuwa Elaiho, Bakery Owner from San Antonio, Texas
- 10th-Phoebe Martinson, Bakery Owner from Olympia, Washington
- 11th-Chad Conklin, Culinary Instructor from Dayton, Ohio
- 12th-Mike Yu, Restaurant Owner from Napa, California

=== Episodes ===
Episodes
No. in season	Title	Original release date
1	"Welcome to Henson and Sons Carnival!"	September 11, 2023
The Thriller: John had the Halloween bakers make "tarot-misu", a tiramisu with a story inspired by a randomly assigned tarot card theme and an Italian flavor. Winner: Ryan McCord (His advantage in the next challenge was to pick a carnival snack that no one else could use.) The Killer: The contestants were tasked to make evil clown cakes. The twist was to incorporate circus snack food into their cakes. Winner: Ryan McCord Eliminated: Mike Yu
2	"Do-nut Ride This Carousel"	September 18, 2023
The Thriller: Inspired by the tale of John's cousin Jesse who got slashed while working at the donut stand, the bakers had to make bloody donuts. Winner: James Cox (His advantage was picking a cake flavor no one else could use… He chose ube.) The Killer: The contestants were tasked to make carousel cakes, with one side showing the joy of the carnival and the other side showing the horror. The twist was to make a carousel cookie topper. NOTE: In an unfortunate turn of events, Chad Conklin left the competition due to illness; however an elimination still took place. Winner: James Cox Eliminated: Phoebe Martinson
3	"Fire-Breathing Pavlovas and Alien Oddities"	September 25, 2023
The Thriller: To honor the circus's fire eater, John has the bakers create flambéed pavlova desserts with selected types of red fruit. Winner: Hollie Fraser won the advantage of being exempt from the twist in the next challenge. The Killer: The contestants are asked to make alien brain charlotte royale cakes with selected green ingredients and an oozing slime effect. The twist was to add freeze-dried green vegetables. Winner: Hollie Fraser Eliminated: Adesuwa Elaiho
4	"The Fantastic Fondante and Funhouse Hall of Mirrors"	October 2, 2023
The Thriller: John tasked the bakers to create desserts inspired by Bloody Mary, with her normal appearance on a large cookie and the reflection of her monstrous form in a dessert bar tray bake. Winner: Hollie Fraser. Her advantage was first pick of teammate in the next challenge. The Killer: The contestants were paired into teams of two to create "Frankenstein" cakes by fusing together two body parts (arm/hand, foot/leg, nose, ear, and tongue). The mid-round twist was to incorporate an unusual mashup into their cakes (peanut butter and basil, coconut and tomato, lime and rosemary, or thyme and grape jelly). Winners: James Cox and Ryan McCord Eliminated: Dan Pivovar and Shefali Patel
5	"Heads Will Roll!"	October 9, 2023
The Thriller: Bakers had to make a trifle depicting a person who was buried alive. They had to include an ingredient that grows underground, choosing from ginger, turmeric, beets, carrots, sweet potatoes, and fennel. Winner: Hollie Fraser won, gaining first pick of dried fruit in the main challenge. The Killer: The competitors made pies with shrunken heads on top and including dried fruits as ingredients. They chose from golden raisins, dried peaches, dried apricots, dried figs, dried dates, and currants. The twist required the bakers to make flavored gelatin eyeballs to top their pies. Winners: Ryan McCord Eliminated: Mandi
6	"Sword Swallow Your Pride!"	October 16, 2023
The Thriller: The bakers had to make a blondie enclosed in a chocolate skull shell. To serve, they poured a warm ganache to melt the skull and reveal the blondie underneath. They had to include a Sno Cone syrup. The options were cherry, blue raspberry, grape, pina colada, and lemon lime. Winner: Stacy won, gaining an extra 10 minutes in the main challenge. The Killer: Inspired by a sword swallower, the bakers made a dessert inside another dessert and topped with an edible sword. The twist involved adding an ingredient that would soothe a sore throat. The choices included honey, ginger, chamomile, lemon, and peppermint. Winners: Hollie and James Eliminated: Krista
7	"A Smashing Good Time!"	October 23, 2023
The Thriller: The bakers were asked to create a torta della nonna with a citrus flavor and decorated with a monster tattoo design. Winner: Hollie won, gaining exclusive use of a type of chocolate in the next challenge. The Killer: The bakers had to create a smashable dessert in a chocolate sphere, filled with a sauce and a baked element. The sphere was presented to the judges by being smashed onto their table from a height. The twist required the addition of walnuts, almonds, pumpkin seeds, or roasted chickpeas. Winners: Hollie Eliminated: Stacy
8	"Step Fright Up!"	October 30, 2023
The Thriller: The bakers made black flourless flower desserts including a required black ingredient. The options were seaweed, black sesame seeds, and black pepper. James chose seaweed (to the surprise of no one), Ryan picked black sesame seeds, and Hollie chose black pepper. Winner: Hollie won, gaining the advantage to assign each baker's theme in the final challenge. The Killer: The bakers had to make a cakescape showing a new attraction at the carnival. They had to pick from a funhouse, a two-headed dragon, and a hall of lost souls. Hollie chose the funhouse and picked the dragon for James and the hall of lost souls for Ryan. Winner: Hollie

=== Judges' Costumes ===
- Episode 1: Carla Hall as creepy clown, Zac Young as Death tarot card, Stephanie Boswell as head inside a crystal ball (inspired by The Haunted Mansion's Madame Leota)
- Episode 2: Carla Hall as a donut shop vendor (inspired by "cousin Jesse"), Zac Young as a carousel rider, Stephanie Boswell as cotton candy
- Episode 3: Carla Hall as an alien (inspired by the 1996 film Mars Attacks!), Zac Young as a contortionist, Stephanie Boswell as Queen of Outer Space
- Episode 4: Carla Hall as a burnt fire swallowing performer, Zac Young as a magician, Stephanie Boswell as the magician's assistant who was sawed in half
- Episode 5: Carla Hall as Medusa, Zac Young as deformed lollipop boy, Stephanie Boswell as Harry Houdini
- Episode 6: Carla Hall as knife swallowing performer, Zac Young as Scare Bear, Stephanie Boswell as the Incredible Melting Woman
- Episode 7: Carla Hall as "Blockhead" performer, Zac Young as a circus strongman, Stephanie Boswell as a tattooed lady
- Episode 8: Carla Hall as conjoined twin, Zac Young as a raccoon performer, Stephanie Boswell as a lion tamer in training

=== Results ===
Contestant	1	2	3	4	5	6	7	8
Hollie	HIGH	IN	WIN‡	HIGH‡	IN‡	WIN	WIN‡	WINNER‡
Ryan	WIN‡	HIGH	IN	WIN	WIN	IN	LOW	OUT
James	LOW	WIN‡	IN	WIN	IN	WIN	IN	OUT
Stacy	IN	IN	IN	LOW	HIGH	LOW‡	OUT	
Christa	IN	LOW	IN	LOW	LOW	OUT		
Mandi	IN	IN	HIGH	HIGH	OUT			
Shefali	IN	IN	IN	OUT				
Dan	IN	IN	LOW	OUT				
Adesuwa	IN	IN	OUT					
Phoebe	IN	OUT						
Chad	LOW	WDR						
Mike	OUT							

(WINNER) The contestant won the whole competition.
(WIN) The contestant won "The Killer" (Main Heat challenge).
(HIGH) The contestant had one of the best dishes for that week.
(IN) The contestant performed well enough to move on to the next week.
(LOW) The contestant had one of the bottom dishes for that week, but was not eliminated.
(WDR) The contestant withdrew from the competition.
(OUT) The contestant was eliminated for worst dish.
‡The contestant won "The Thriller" (Preheat challenge)

== Season 10 (2024) ==
This season is themed around mad scientists, with host John Henson as the owner of "Henson Laboratories". In each challenge, bakers are asked to create desserts to appease the evil spirits that haunt the lab.

=== Contestants ===
- 1st - Manny Martinez, Bakery Owner from San Antonio, Texas
- 2/3/4th - Aaron Davis, Pastry Lead from Surprise, Arizona. (Note: Davis previously competed on Holiday Baking Championship season 9 where he finished 3rd/4th place in the finale.)
- 2/3/4th - Joel Gonzalez, Executive Pastry Chef from Scottsdale, Arizona
- 2/3/4th - Hollie Rivera, Assistant Pastry Chef from Winnipeg, Manitoba
- 5th - Lillian Chng, Home Bakery Owner from San Diego, California
- 6th - Thierry Aujard, Executive Pastry Chef from Norristown, Pennsylvania
- 7th - Megan Aucone, Pastry Chef and Cake Artist from Sayreville, New Jersey
- 8th - JL Hinojosa, Pastry Chef de Partie from Austin, Texas
- 9th - Carly Robertson, Bakery Owner from Lehi, Utah
- 10th - Samantha Santiago Torres, Executive Pastry Chef from Chicago, Illinois

=== Episodes ===
Episodes
No. in season	Title	Original release date
1	"Laboratory Story"	September 16, 2024
The Thriller: In a challenge themed around the chemistry lab, John asked the bakers to create a dessert featuring edible broken laboratory glassware. Winner: Aaron won, receiving an "Immunity Potion" protecting him from elimination in the main challenge. The Killer: The contestants were tasked with making a dessert themed around toxic sludge. The dish was required to include a dry ice mist effect and bubble-shaped components. Winner: Joel Eliminated: Samantha
2	"Beetlejuice Beetlejuice"	September 23, 2024
The Thriller: In a challenge themed around the titular poltergeist in the Beetlejuice Beetlejuice movie, contestants were assigned black and white desserts using black and white ingredients. Winner: Joel won, receiving an "Immunity Potion" protecting him from elimination in the main challenge. The Killer: The contestants were assigned a big dessert with a small one on sitting on top of it, as an ode to the Shrinker characters in Beetlejuice. Winner: Thierry Eliminated: Carly
3	"Mad Mutations and Transformations"	September 30, 2024
The Thriller: In teams of two, the bakers made a stuffed dessert shaped like a body part and using a flavor profile from a chosen variety of candy corn. Winners: Aaron and Manny won, both receiving immunity from elimination. The Killer: Inspired by animal plushies and the tale of a "cuteness potion" gone wrong, the bakers made desserts showing a cute creature mutated into a monster. Winner: Lillian Eliminated: JL
4	"Rotten and Forgotten Desserts"	October 7, 2024
The Thriller: The bakers had 90 minutes to make an "umummy" dessert with a mummy theme and a savory umami ingredient. Winner: Thierry won, gaining immunity from elimination. The Killer: The bakers had 2 hours to make a skeleton-themed dessert featuring a randomly picked Halloween candy flavor profile and a required dessert technique. Winner: Aaron Eliminated: Megan
5	"Wizard of Labs"	October 14, 2024
The Thriller: In a promotion for the 85th anniversary release of The Wizard of Oz, the bakers were given 90 minutes to make tornado-themed desserts decorated with a piece of lab equipment. Winner: Manny won, gaining immunity from elimination. The Killer: The bakers had 2 hours to make a dessert inspired by the Wicked Witch of the West and her melting scene, featuring an oozing green element. Winner: Joel Eliminated: Thierry
6	"Otherworldly Treats"	October 21, 2024
The Thriller: In a "Build-A-Spirit" challenge, the contestants had 90 minutes to make desserts inspired by x-ray charts with a monster's body shape, favorite food, and activity. Winner: Lillian won. With immunity no longer in play, Lillian's advantage in the Killer challenge was to swap her creature type with another contestant. The Killer: The bakers had two and a half hours to make entremets depicting a portal to the underworld. They were assigned a type of creature which they had to sculpt emerging from the portal. Winner: Hollie Eliminated: Lillian
7	"The Past Comes Back to Haunt You"	October 28, 2024
The Thriller: The bakers had two and a half hours to make a dessert that looked like a dissected creature and included a gummy or gelatin heart. Winner: Manny won, gaining the advantage to assign the themes in the final challenge. The Killer: Inspired by a time machine, the bakers had five hours to make a cake featuring an assigned time period and monster: medieval vampires in Romania (Manny), Mary Shelley's Frankenstein (Joel), ancient werewolves (Hollie), and early aliens in ancient Egypt (Aaron). Winner: Manny

=== Judges' Costumes ===
- Episode 1: Carla Hall as a neuroscientist with an exposed brain, Stephanie Boswell as a chemist mutated by a chemical spill, and Zac Young as a beaker of green slime
- Episode 2: Carla Hall as a victim of an exploding stand mixer, Stephanie Boswell as a victim of killer macarons, and Zac Young as a victim of a sprinkles allergy
- Episode 3: Carla Hall as a creepy psychedelic bunny, Stephanie Boswell as a cutesy bunny, and Zac Young as a monstrous bunny
- Episode 4: Carla Hall as a skeleton lady, Stephanie Boswell as a mummy influencer, and Zac Young as Mummy Dearest
- Episode 5: Carla Hall as a house's front door, Stephanie Boswell as a tornado, and Zac Young as a cow
- Episode 6: Carla Hall as a headless demon, Stephanie Boswell as the nosey neighbor from Hades, and Zac Young as a goat demon
- Episode 7: Carla Hall as a were-chicken, Stephanie Boswell as a reanimated lady, and Zac Young as a vampire agent

=== Results ===
Contestant	1	2	3	4	5	6	7
Manny	IN	HIGH	IN‡	IN	IN‡	LOW	WINNER‡
Aaron	IN‡	IN	HIGH‡	WIN	HIGH	IN	OUT
Joel	WIN	IN‡	LOW	HIGH	WIN	HIGH	OUT
Hollie	IN	LOW	IN	LOW	LOW	WIN	OUT
Lillian	IN	IN	WIN	IN	IN	OUT‡	
Thierry	HIGH	WIN	IN	IN‡	OUT		
Megan	IN	IN	IN	OUT			
JL	IN	IN	OUT				
Carly	LOW	OUT					
Samantha	OUT						

(WINNER) The contestant won the whole competition.
(WIN) The contestant won "The Killer" (Main Heat challenge).
(HIGH) The contestant had one of the best dishes for that week.
(IN) The contestant performed well enough to move on to the next week.
(LOW) The contestant had one of the bottom dishes for that week, but was not eliminated.
(OUT) The contestant was eliminated for worst dish.
‡The contestant won "The Thriller" (Preheat challenge)

== Season 11 (2025) ==
Season 11 is themed around a haunted mansion, with returning host John Henson and judges Carla Hall, Stephanie Boswell, and Zac Young. In a change of format this season, some episodes start with all contestants in a "Haunted Heat" with the winner receiving $1000. Then, the bottom three from the first heat must compete in a "Bake for Your Life" elimination challenge.

=== Contestants ===
- 1st - Melanie Bjork-Jensen, Self-taught baker from West Jordan, Utah
- 2nd/3rd/4th - Alan Arras, Pastry Sous Chef from Orlando, Florida
- 2nd/3rd/4th - Cory Jones, Bakery Owner from Unadilla, Georgia
- 2nd/3rd/4th - Oksana Shchelgachova, Pastry Chef and Owner of Pastry Boutique from Highlands, North Carolina
- 5th - Camille La Caer, Pastry Chef from Buffalo, New York
- 6th - Jake Hagen, Pastry Chef from Granada Hills, California
- 7/8th - Gonzuela Bastarache, Home Baker from Moncton, New Brunswick, Canada
- 7/8th - Megan Carroll, Food Photographer from Minneapolis, Minnesota
- 9th - Nina Charles, Cake Artist and Bakery Owner from Carencro, Louisiana
- 10th - Justin Giordano, Cake Artist from New York City, New York

=== Episodes ===
Episodes
No. in season	Title	Original release date
1	"For Doom the Bell Tolls"	September 15, 2025
Haunted Heat: The bakers were given two and a half hours to make a dessert representing their greatest fear. The dessert was required to feature a blood-spurting effect and a randomly-assigned flavor. Alan won the challenge and received a $1000 prize. Bake for Your Life: As the lowest ranked, Megan, Cory, and Oksana entered an elimination challenge. They had to make desserts shaped like "witch symbols." However, before judging was complete, Justin announced he was withdrawing from the competition due to his discomfort with being on camera. No one else was eliminated.
2	"This Bold House"	September 22, 2025
Haunted Heat: The bakers made "organ donation" desserts with the appearance of a chosen human organ and a type of nut as a required ingredient. Jake was the winner. Bake for Your Life: Melanie, Oksana, and Nina competed to avoid elimination. They made desserts themed around a chosen haunted household appliance: a toaster, an old TV set, or a handheld vacuum. Nina was eliminated.
3	"Engrossed with Ghosts"	September 29, 2025
Haunted Heat: John asked the bakers to make chocolate desserts depicting a living thing transforming into a ghost. Each baker randomly selected from four required types of chocolate: milk, dark, white, or blond. Oksana was the winner. Bake for Your Life: Camille, Alan, and Gonzuela were the lowest rated and had to bake a "ghost of your ancestor" dessert to honor a recipe from their family history. At judging, the judges were deadlocked as they considered all three dishes to be very good. They decided not to eliminate anyone but warned that there would be two eliminations in the next episode.
4	"Messages from Beyond"	October 6, 2025
Haunted Heat: This episode featured only one challenge, with the winner awarded $1000 and the bottom two contestants eliminated. Inspired by cryptic spirit writing, the bakers were given three hours to make desserts with a hidden message to be revealed during their presentation to the judges. Each also randomly chose a required ingredient. Cory was the winner. Megan and Gonzuela were the lowest ranked and were eliminated.
5	"Flawed Anatomy"	October 13, 2025
Bake for Your Life: This episode featured only one challenge, a "Bake for Your Life" challenge for all competitors. They were given three hours to make a "spliced souls" dessert depicting two beings merged together, including two faces and multiple limbs. Each baker randomly picked a required flavor, then had free choice of a second flavor to feature in combination with it (though vanilla and white chocolate could not be chosen). The winner was Oksana. Jake was the lowest ranked baker and was eliminated.
6	"It All Begins with Us"	October 20, 2025
Haunted Heat: In a promotion for the series It: Welcome to Derry, the bakers were given two hours to make desserts depicting their most feared childhood monster. Cory was the winner. Bake for Your Life: Camille, Oksana, and Melanie were the lowest ranked in the Haunted Heat and competed in the elimination challenge. They made "deranged clown" desserts inspired by Pennywise and had to choose a red required ingredient: red miso, cherry tomato, or hibiscus. Oksana won this challenge. Camille was eliminated.
7	"Happy Haunting Grounds"	October 27, 2025
Haunted Heat: Inspired by the mansion's grounds, the bakers were asked to make desserts based on one of four selected themes: a haunted tree, gazebo, fountain, or hedge maze. They also incorporated "haunted grounds" coffee as a required ingredient. Alan was the winner. Bake for Your Afterlife: For the final, the bakers made ornate layer cakes that illustrated their most feared way to die. As the winner of the Haunted Heat, Alan received an advantage; he could choose his theme from all options written by the competitors and assign themes to his opponents. Alan chose "skinned alive" for himself, and gave "crushed to death" to Melanie, "eaten by bugs" to Oksana, and "drowning" to Cory. Melanie won the championship with a chocolate peanut butter cake with monochromatic Victorian piping and a fault line depicting crushed body parts.

=== Results ===
Contestant	1	2	3	4	5	6	7	
Melanie	IN	RISK	IN	IN	IN	RISK	IN	WINNER
Alan	WIN	IN	RISK	IN	LOW	HIGH	WIN	OUT
Cory	RISK	IN	HIGH	WIN	IN	WIN	IN	OUT
Oksana	RISK	RISK	WIN	IN	WIN	RISK	IN	OUT
Camille	IN	IN	RISK	HIGH	LOW	OUT		
Jake	IN	WIN	IN	LOW	OUT			
Megan	RISK	HIGH	IN	OUT				
Gonzuela	IN	IN	RISK	OUT				
Nina	HIGH	OUT						
Justin	WDR							

(WINNER) The contestant won the whole competition.
(WIN) The contestant won the Haunted Heat
(HIGH) The contestant had one of the best dishes in the Haunted Heat.
(IN) The contestant performed well enough to move on to the next week.
(RISK) The contestant had one of the bottom dishes in the Haunted Heat and competed in the Bake for Your Life challenge, but was not eliminated.
(LOW) The contestant had one of the bottom dishes in the episode's only challenge but was not eliminated.
(OUT) The contestant was eliminated for worst dish.
(WDR) The contestant withdrew from the competition.

== Season 12 (2026) ==
Season 12 premiered on September 14, 2026 and features host John Henson as the curator of the fictional "Museum of Unnatural History." Judges Stephanie Boswell and Zac Young return, while Aarti Sequeira replaces Carla Hall.

=== Contestants ===
- 1st - Ciarra Roberts, Pastry Sous Chef from Denver, Colorado
- 2nd/3rd/4th - Kyle Caulkins, Pastry Chef from Charleston, South Carolina
- 2nd/3rd/4th - Kyle Olson, Executive Pastry Chef from Columbus, Ohio
- 2nd/3rd/4th - Lisa Pak, Home Bakery Owner from New York City, New York
- 5th - Caleb King, Pastry Sous Chef from Seattle, Washington
- 6th - Marian Mulero, Owner of Chef Marian Cakes & Dessert Tables from Miami, Florida
- 7th - Elizabeth Suwanski, Project Manager and Home Baker from Chicago, Illinois
- 8th - Baindu Squire, Cake Artist from New Orleans, Louisiana
- 9th - Justin Giordano, Cake Artist from New York City, New York (Note: Justin previously appeared in season 11 but withdrew from the competition during the first episode.)
- 10th - Katie Shegda, Pastry Chef from Greenville, South Carolina

=== Episodes ===
Episodes
No. in season	Title	Original release date
1	"The Museum of Unnatural History"	September 14, 2026
Haunted Heat: John Henson asked the bakers to make a dessert inspired by their personal "Best Halloween Ever" with the required ingredient of nuts which they selected. Marian was the winner, receiving a bonus prize of $1000. Bake for Your Life: Only the top three in the Haunted Heat were safe, while the other seven entered the elimination challenge. They selected masks, then had to create desserts that reinterpreted their mask into a demon mask. Katie was lowest ranked and was eliminated. Judges' costumes: Stephanie Boswell as a crying clown, Zac Young as Peter Pan, and Aarti Sequeira as a cardboard box robot.
2	"Into the Wild"	September 21, 2026
Haunted Heat: The bakers made desserts depicting taxidermy of monstrous beasts, using a chosen theme animal and a type of dried fruit. Kyle C. won the challenge. Bake for Your Life: The bottom six bakers had to make a demonic "possessed pest" dessert themed around a randomly chosen bug species. After a blind judging, Ciarra was recognized for having the best dish, while Justin was eliminated. Judges' costumes: Aarti as a ladybug, Zac as a rainbow caterpillar, Stephanie as a black widow spider
3	"Halloween Haunts"	September 28, 2026
Haunted Heat: In a promotion for Disney Cruise Line, the bakers were asked to make Halloween-themed cakes, half depicting a hero and half a villain. Marian was the winner and received the bonus reward of a cruise vacation. Bake for Your Life: The bottom five bakers had to make a dessert depicting a haunted mirror, with each selecting a different thematic attribute. Kyle O. was recognized as the best of this challenge. Baindu was eliminated. Judges' costumes: Aarti as a Victorian lady ghost, Zac as lamp man, Stephanie as a ghostly bride
4	"Who's Ruining Your Ruin?"	October 5, 2026
In the episode's sole challenge, the bakers had three hours to make a dessert depicting a selected ancient ruin and its accompanying monster. Ciarra won. Elizabeth was eliminated. Judges' costumes: Aarti as a skunk, Stephanie as queen of the iguanas, Zac as a zombie tourist
5	"Doll Trouble"	October 12, 2026
The bakers competed in one-on-one matches to make possessed doll desserts featuring the flavors pumpkin and chocolate. For winning the previous challenge, Ciarra got the advantage of first choice of dessert type and opponent. Ciarra chose to compete against Kyle C. making Swiss rolls. Kyle O. and Marian made baked cheesecakes. Caleb and Lisa made Paris–Brest. Kyle C. was the overall winner. The three losing bakers were at risk, with Marian ultimately being sent home. Judges' costumes: Aarti as Raggedy Ann, Zac as a Nordic girl doll, Stephanie as a two-headed doll.
6	"Masters of the Macabre"	October 19, 2026
Haunted Heat: The bakers made desserts inspired by macabre oil paintings. Ciarra was the winner. Bake for Your Life: The bottom three bakers had to make witch-themed desserts featuring three working edible candles. After a blind judging, Kyle C. was named as the best in the challenge. Caleb was eliminated. Judges' costumes: Stephanie as a snake-covered witch, Zac as a stand-up comic witch, Aarti as a frog
7	"Ancient Rites (That Feel So Wrong)"	October 26, 2026
Bake for All the Bones: The bakers had five hours to make an intricate cake inspired by a decorated ossuary. Ciarra won the championship with a bleeding skeleton molasses spiced cake with apple pie filling. Judges' costumes: Aarti as the Empress of Bones, Zac as a skeletal orthopedist, Stephanie as a boneheaded bodybuilder

=== Results ===
Contestant	1	2	3	4	5	6	7
Ciarra	IN	IN ‡	HIGH	WIN	LOW	WIN	WINNER
Kyle C.	HIGH	WIN	IN	IN	WIN	IN ‡	OUT
Kyle O.	IN	IN	IN ‡	LOW	HIGH	HIGH	OUT
Lisa	IN	IN	HIGH	HIGH	LOW	LOW	OUT
Caleb	IN	HIGH	LOW	IN	HIGH	OUT	
Marian	WIN	IN	WIN	IN	OUT		
Elizabeth	IN	HIGH	LOW	OUT			
Baindu	LOW	LOW	OUT				
Justin	HIGH	OUT					
Katie	OUT						

(WINNER) The contestant won the whole competition.
(WIN) The contestant won the Haunted Heat
(HIGH) The contestant had one of the best dishes in the Haunted Heat.
(IN) The contestant performed well enough to move on to the next week.
‡ The judges recognized this contestant for having the best dish in the Bake for Your Life challenge.
(LOW) The contestant had one of the bottom dishes but was not eliminated.
(OUT) The contestant was eliminated for worst dish.
