= Halloween Baking Championship =

American food reality television series

- Genre: Food reality television
- Presented by: Richard Blais; Jeff Dunham; John Henson; Carla Hall
- Judges: Carla Hall; Ron Ben-Israel; Sherry Yard; Damiano Carrara; Sandra Lee; Lorraine Pascale; Zac Young; Katie Lee; Stephanie Boswell; Aarti Sequeira
- Country of origin: United States
- Original language: English
- No. of seasons: 12
- No. of episodes: 78 (list of episodes)

Production
- Running time: 41-84 minutes

Original release
- Network: Food Network
- Release: October 5, 2015 – present

Halloween Baking Championship is an American cooking reality competition series that premiered on Food Network on October 5, 2015. A spin off of Holiday Baking Championship, the series is a seasonal program that runs annually and features professional and amateur bakers competing to make Halloween themed desserts. The twelfth season premiered on September 14, 2026.

== Format ==
Most episodes have two rounds. The first round is alternately called the "Preheat," the "Thriller" or the "Haunted Heat" depending on the season. Each baker must make a small dessert based on an assigned theme and often a required ingredient. The person who wins the first round gets a prize or advantage in the next round, which has varied throughout the series. For example, the advantage may be exclusive choice of ingredients or themes, assigning these to other contestants, or protection from elimination.

The second round is alternately titled the "Main Heat," the "Killer," or the "Bake for Your Life" challenge. The contestants typically get a longer time to bake a larger dessert, which must include a new theme and/or ingredients. The lowest-ranked baker in this round is eliminated every episode except for the last one. In the finale, the remaining three or four contestants compete in a winner-take-all final round. The winner gets $25,000 and in some seasons are given a feature article in Food Network Magazine.

From season 6 onward, every season has an overarching theme that relates to the theme of each challenge. For example, season 6 featured a haunted house theme, with each challenge being associated with a different room in the house.

== Host and judges ==
The first season was hosted by Richard Blais with chefs Carla Hall, Ron Ben-Israel, and Sherry Yard serving as judges. The second season saw Carla Hall as the only returning chef/judge. She was joined by Food Network personality Sandra Lee and Damiano Carrara to help judge, and comedian Jeff Dunham as the host. For seasons three through five, the show was hosted by John Henson. Lorraine Pascale and Zac Young joined Carla Hall as judges for the third and fourth seasons, while Katie Lee replaced Pascale for season five. For the sixth season, Henson did not return to the show (likely due to difficulties owing to the COVID-19 pandemic, which was ongoing at the time). As a result, Carla Hall served as both a judge and a host for that season; she was accompanied by Zac Young and Stephanie Boswell as judges. John Henson returned to serve as host in 2021 for season seven and Carla Hall, Zac Young and Stephanie Boswell returned as judges. This lineup remained consistent until season twelve in 2026, when Aarti Sequeira joined the judging panel, replacing Carla Hall.

== Series overview ==
Season	Episodes	Originally aired	
Season	Episodes	First aired	Last aired
1	4	October 5, 2015	October 26, 2015
2	5	October 3, 2016	October 31, 2016
3	6	September 25, 2017	October 30, 2017
4	6	September 24, 2018	October 29, 2018
5	6	September 23, 2019	October 28, 2019
6	7	September 14, 2020	October 26, 2020
7	7	September 13, 2021	October 25, 2021
8	8	September 12, 2022	October 31, 2022
9	8	September 11, 2023	October 30, 2023
10	7	September 16, 2024	October 28, 2024
11	7	September 15, 2025	October 27, 2025
12	7	September 14, 2026	October 26, 2026
