= Back from the Grave =

Back from the Grave may refer to:

- Back from the Grave (series), music compilation series
- Back from the Grave, Volume 1, 1983, first release of the series
- Back from the Grave (Grave album), 2002 album by the Swedish death metal band
- "Back from the Grave", song by the Chromatics from Kill for Love
