= Damiano Carrara =

Italian chef (born 1985)

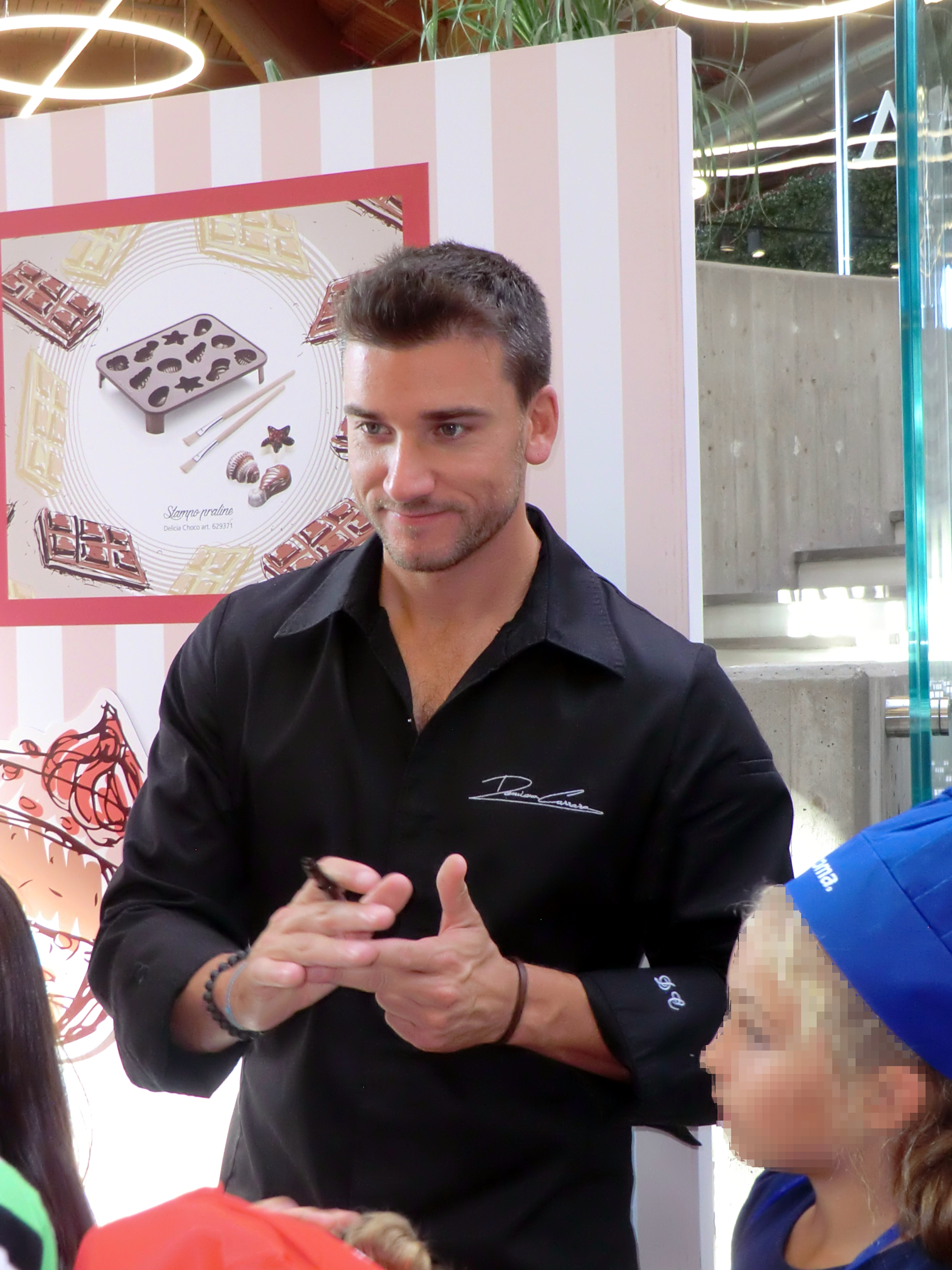
- Born: 22 September 1985 (age 40); Lucca, Italy
- Culinary career
- Cooking style: Italian; Pastries
- Television shows: Spring Baking Championship; Christmas Cookie Challenge; Halloween Baking Championship

Damiano Carrara (born 22 September 1985) is an Italian chef, restaurateur and cookbook author who resides in Italy.

== Early life ==
Carrara was born in Lucca, Tuscany. He served as a bartender at age 19 in his hometown before he continued bartending across Dublin, Ireland. By 2012, he and his brother Massimiliano had relocated to Moorpark, California, where they opened their bakery Carrara Pastries. In 2013, they opened a second location in Agoura Hills, California. In 2023 the Carrara Pastry companies were sold to a new owner.

== Career ==
Carrara has made television appearances on several Food Network series. He first came to prominence as a contestant in the premier season of Spring Baking Championship in 2015, where he finished in second place. Later that year, he went on to win the "Chocotage XXL" episode of Cutthroat Kitchen.

Carrara also infrequently served as a judge on Bakers vs. Fakers and Winner Cake All. Carrara also served as a judge in the Christmas Cookie Challenge, which aired on Food Network in 2017.

=== Food Network Star and Halloween Baking Championship ===
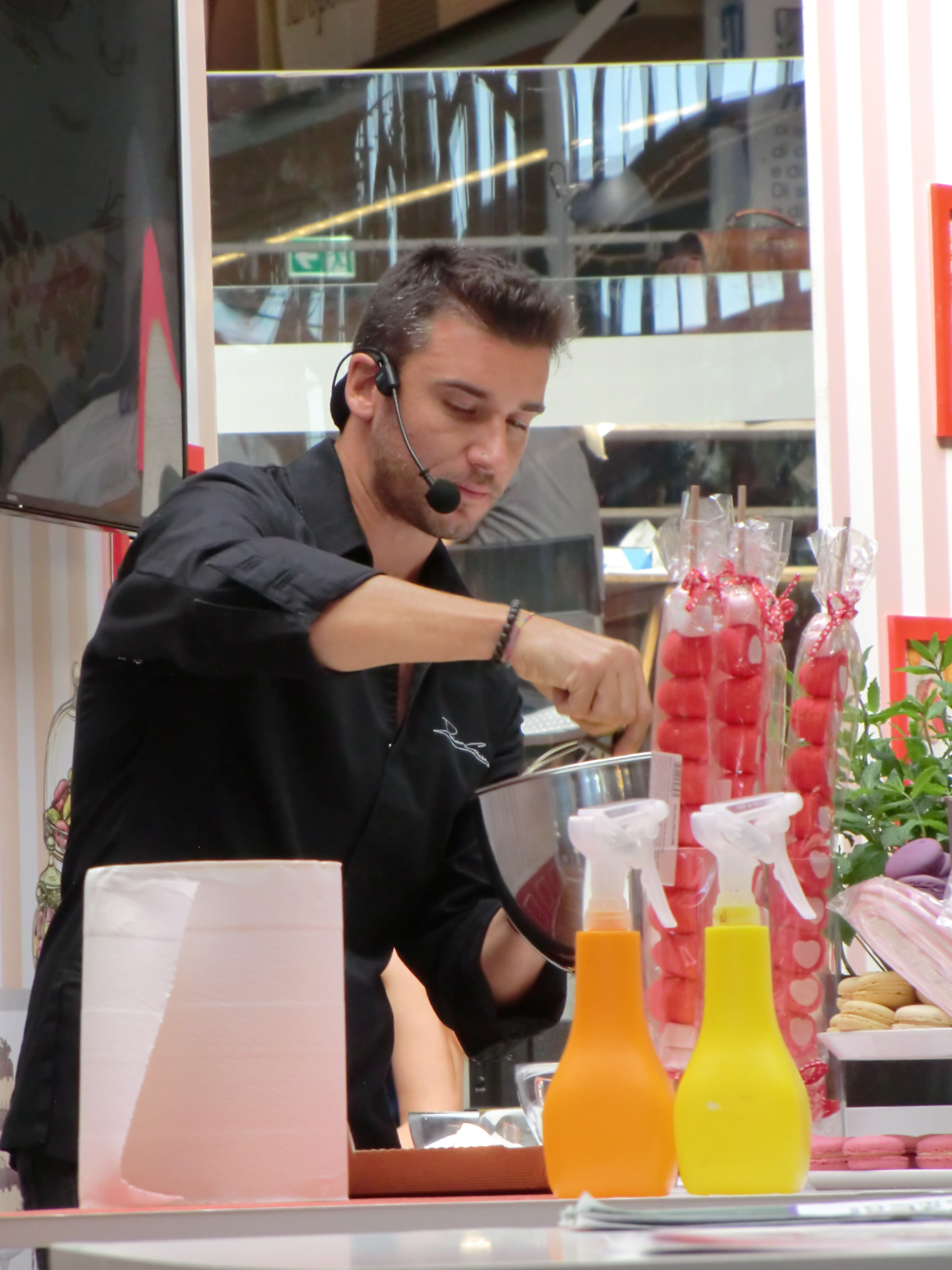
Damiano Carrara bakes a crostata for a cooking demo in Bologna, Italy.

In May 2016, Carrara was announced as a contestant for the twelfth season of Food Network Star. He survived until midway through the season finale, finishing in third place. In October 2016, he served as one of the judges in the second season of Halloween Baking Championship.

== Filmography ==
=== Television ===
- Spring Baking Championship - SECOND PLACE (6 episodes, 2015)
- Cuthroat Kitchen: Chocotage XXL - WINNER (2015)
- Food Network Star Season 12 - THIRD PLACE (2016)
- Halloween Baking Championship Season 2 - JUDGE (2016)
- Christmas Cookie Challenge 2 - JUDGE (2016)
- Guy's Grocery Games - JUDGE (1 episode, 2017)
- Bakers vs. Fakers - JUDGE (2 episodes, 2017)
- Christmas Cookie Challenge - JUDGE (3 episodes, 2017)
- Cake Star: Pasticcerie in sfida Season 1–6 - HOST (2018–2022) with Katia Follesa
- Home & Family - SELF (4 episodes, 2017–2018)
- Bake Off Italia: Dolci in forno - JUDGE (43 episodes, 2017–2020)
- Chopped Sweets - JUDGE (1 episode, 2021)

== Bibliography ==
Year	Title	Publisher	ISBN
2016	Dolce Italia: Authentic Italian Baking	Lulu	1483443264
