= Return to Life =

Return to Life may refer to:

- Return to Life (film), a 1949 French drama portmanteau film
- Return to Life (album), a 2012 album by War of Ages
- Return to Life (book), a 2015 book by Jim B. Tucker
