= Back to Life =

Back to Life may refer to:

== Books ==
- Back to Life: Poems from behind the Iron Curtain, 1958, ed. Robert Conquest
- Back to Life (novel), 2004 novel by Wendy Coakley-Thompson
- Back to Life, The Rachel Riley Diaries, 2009 novel by Joanna Nadin

== Film and TV ==
- Back to Life (1913 film), American silent short drama featuring Lon Chaney
- Back to Life (1925 film), American silent war drama film
- Back to Life (2023 film), Venezuelan comedy-drama film
- Back to Life (TV series), 2019 British TV show

== Music ==
=== Albums ===
- Back to Life (Fred Frith album), 2008
- Back to Life (Sandra album), 2009
- Back to Life (Steve Roach album), 2012
- Back to Life (Anthony Evans album), 2017
- Back to Life (Hinder album), 2025
- Back 2 Life (Sean Kingston album), 2013 album by Sean Kingston
- Back 2 Life (LeToya Luckett album), 2017
- Back 2 Life (Thaiboy Digital album), 2022
- Back to Life (EP), 2025 EP by &Team

=== Songs ===
- "Back to Life (However Do You Want Me)", 1989 song by Soul II Soul
- "Back to Life" (Alicia Keys song), 2016
- "Back to Life" (Hailee Steinfeld song), 2018
- "Back to Life" (Rascal Flatts song), 2018
- "Back 2 Life (Live It Up)", 2012 song by Sean Kingston
- "Back 2 Life" (song), 2016 song by LeToya Luckett
- "Back to Life", by Sugababes from The Lost Tapes (Sugababes album), 2022
- "Back to Life", by Zayn from Icarus Falls

== See also ==
- "Coming Back to Life", 1994 song by Pink Floyd
- Eaten Back to Life, 1990 album by Cannibal Corpse
- Resurrection
- Immortality
- Reincarnation
