= Briarcliff Manor, New York =

Village in New York, US

- Village
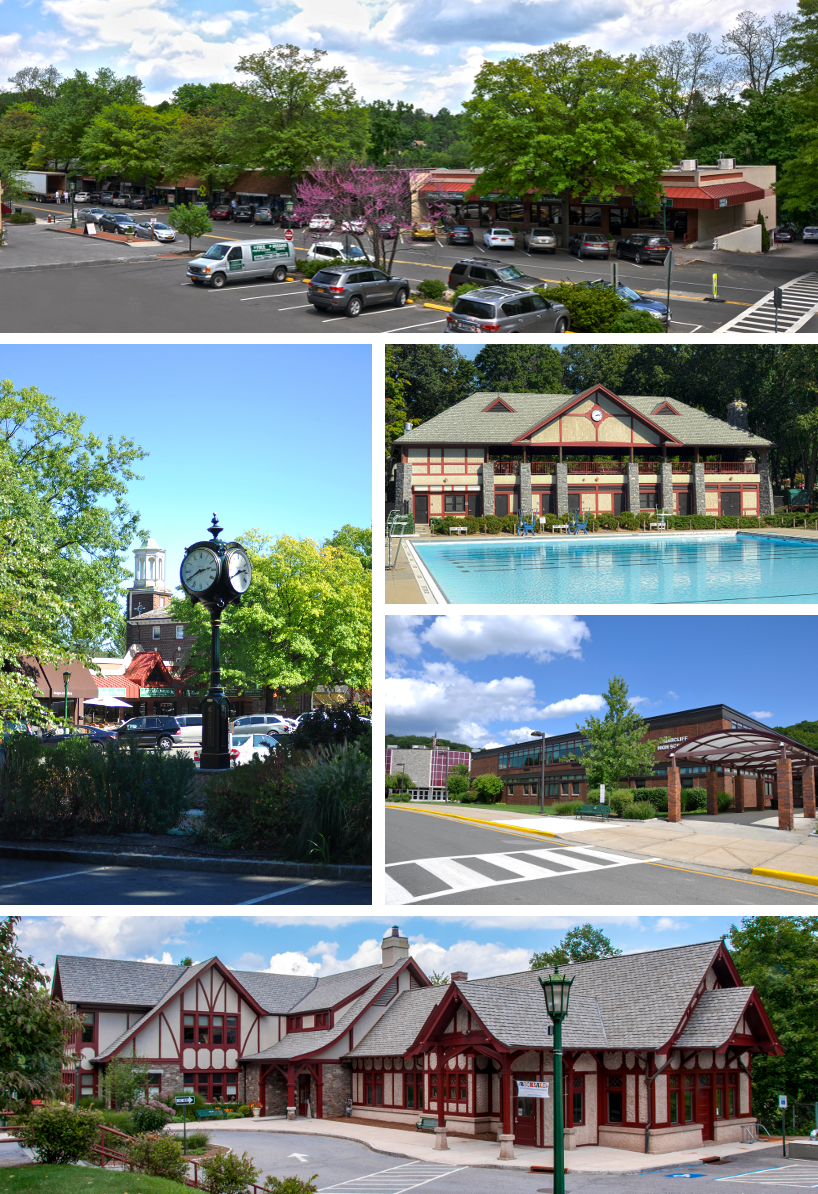
- Clockwise from top: the Village Center; village pool at Law Memorial Park; Briarcliff High School; Briarcliff Manor Public Library; village clock and Municipal Building.

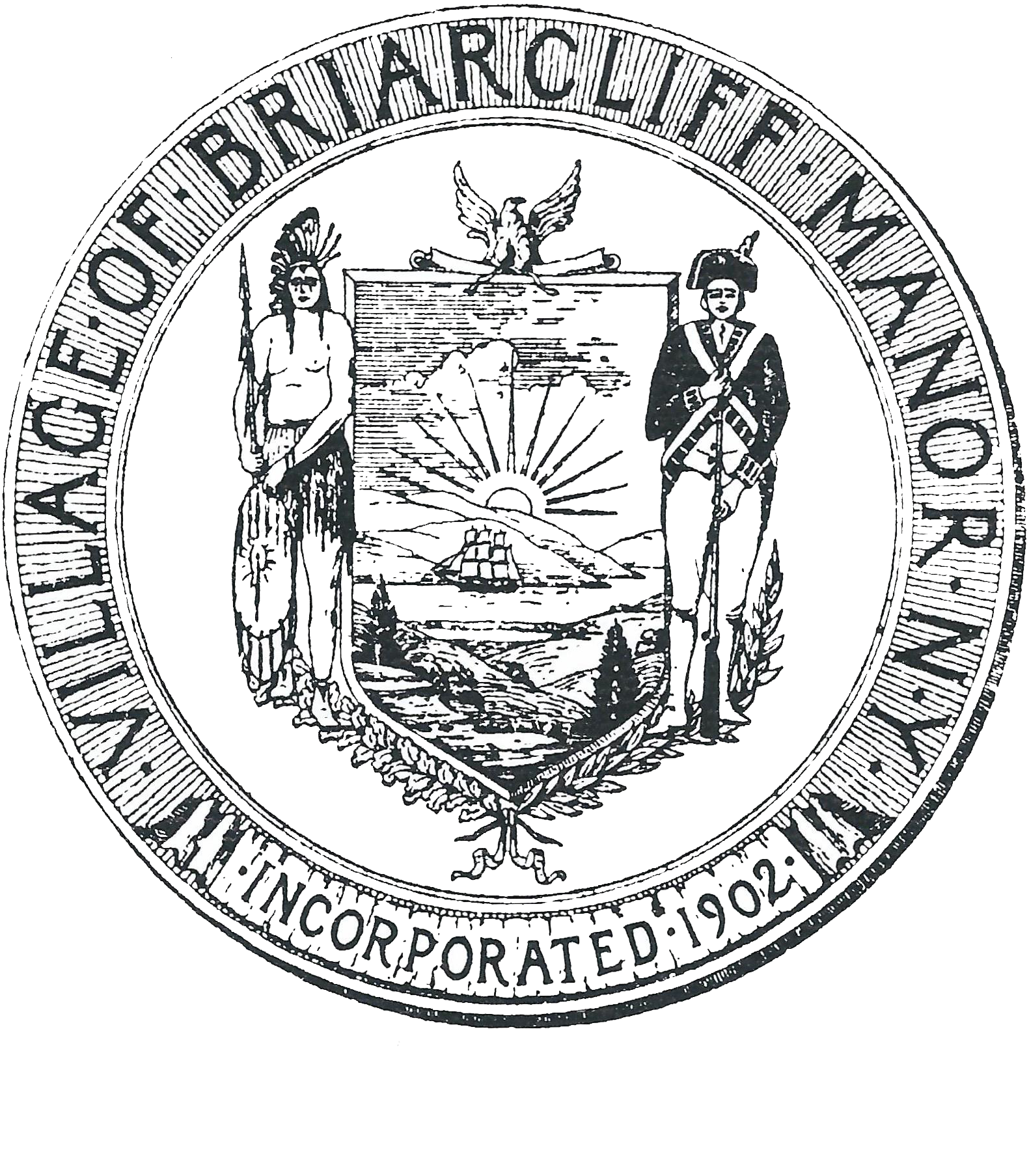
- Village seal Village symbol
- Nickname: Briarcliff
- Motto: A village between two rivers
- Interactive map of Briarcliff Manor, New York
- Coordinates: 41°08′N 73°50′W
- Country: United States
- State: New York
- Region: Hudson Valley
- County: Westchester
- Municipality: Mount Pleasant and Ossining
- Incorporation: 1902
- Founder: Walter William Law
- Named for: The Irish family home "Brier Cliff"
- Seat: Briarcliff Manor Village Hall, 1111 Pleasantville Road, 41°08′56″N 73°49′43″W
- Parts: Chilmark and Scarborough

Government
  - Type: Council-Manager
  - Mayor: Steven A. Vescio (People's Caucus)
  - Board: Trustees: Peter S. Chatzky; Rhea Mallett; Kevin Hunt

Area
  - Total: 6.83 sq mi (17.70 km^{2})
  - Land: 6.00 sq mi (15.53 km^{2})
  - Water: 0.84 sq mi (2.17 km^{2})
- Elevation: 351 ft (107 m)
- Highest elevation (41°09′24″N 73°50′46″W): 533 ft (162 m)
- Lowest elevation (Hudson River): 0 ft (0 m)

Population (2020)
  - Total: 7,569
  - Density: 1,262.5/sq mi (487.44/km^{2})
- Time zone: UTC−5 (EST)
  - Summer (DST): UTC−4 (EDT)
- ZIP Code: 10510
- Area code: 914
- FIPS code: 36-08103
- GNIS feature ID: 969912, 2391558
- VIAF code: VIAF 130216697
- Website: www.briarcliffmanor.gov

Briarcliff Manor (/ˈbraɪ.ərklɪf/) is a suburban village in Westchester County, New York, United States, 30 miles (50 km) north of New York City. It is on 5.9 square miles (15 km^{2}) of land on the east bank of the Hudson River, geographically shared by the towns of Mount Pleasant and Ossining. Briarcliff Manor includes the communities of Scarborough and Chilmark, and is served by the Scarborough station of the Metro-North Railroad's Hudson Line. A section of the village, including buildings and homes covering 376 acres (152 ha), is part of the Scarborough Historic District and was listed on the National Register of Historic Places in 1984. The village motto is "A village between two rivers", reflecting Briarcliff Manor's location between the Hudson and Pocantico Rivers. Although the Pocantico is the primary boundary between Mount Pleasant and Ossining, since its incorporation the village has spread into Mount Pleasant.

In the precolonial era, the village's area was inhabited by a band of the Wappinger tribes of Native Americans. In the early 19th century, the area was known as Whitson's Corners. Walter William Law moved to the area and purchased lands during the 1890s. Law developed the village, establishing schools, churches, parks, and the Briarcliff Lodge. Briarcliff Manor was incorporated as a village in 1902, and celebrated its centennial on November 21, 2002. The village has grown from 331 people when established to 7,569 at the 2020 census.

Briarcliff Manor was historically known for its wealthy estate-owning families, including the Vanderbilts, Astors, and Rockefellers. The village still remains primarily residential and its population is still considered affluent by U.S. standards. It has about 180 acres (70 ha) of recreational facilities and parks, all accessible to the public. The village has seven Christian churches for various denominations and two synagogues. The oldest church is Saint Mary's Episcopal Church, built in 1851. Briarcliff Manor has an elected local government, with departments including police, fire, recreation, and public works. It has a low crime rate: a 2012 study found it had the second-lowest in the state. In the New York State Legislature it is split between the New York State Assembly's 95th and 92nd districts, and the New York Senate's 38th and 40th districts. In Congress the village is in New York's 17th District.

== History ==
=== Names ===
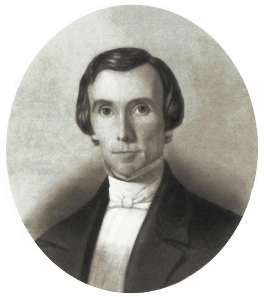
John David Ogilby

Part of modern-day Briarcliff Manor was once known as Whitson's Corners for brothers John H., Richard, and Reuben Whitson, who owned adjoining farms in the area totaling 400 acres (160 ha). Whitson's Corners was named after the corner of Pleasantville and South State roads, where John H. Whitson's house, the Crossways, stood from 1820 until the 1940s. (Note: John H. Whitson was the first village postmaster, and his house was the village post office's third location.) The Briarcliff Congregational Church's parish house currently stands at its former location. The neighboring community of Scarborough was known as Weskora until it was renamed in 1864, after resident William Kemey's ancestral hometown in Yorkshire. After the community was incorporated into Briarcliff Manor in 1906, the New York Central and Hudson River Railroad put up a sign reading "Briarcliff West" at the village's Scarborough station. Soon afterward, attributed to the neighborhood's pride over their name, that sign was thrown into the Hudson River and replaced with the original Scarborough sign.

Briarcliff Manor derives from "Brier Cliff", a compound of the English words "brier" (Note: "Brier" is a variant spelling of "briar", used for a number of unrelated thicket-forming thorny plants.) and "cliff". The name originated in Ireland as that of the family home of John David Ogilby, a professor of ecclesiastical history at the General Theological Seminary. Ogilby had named his New York summer home Brier Cliff after his family home in Ireland. In 1890, Walter Law bought James Stillman's 236-acre (96 ha) Briarcliff Farm and further developed it, later using the name Briarcliff for all his property. Law's friend, Andrew Carnegie, called him "The Laird of Briarcliff Manor"; since the title appealed to all concerned, the village was named "Briarcliff Manor". By 1897, the village post office and railroad station bore the name Briarcliff Manor. The village (and its name) were approved by its residents in a September 12, 1902 referendum; the name prevailed over other suggestions, including "Sing Sing East". (Note: Sing Sing was the name of the neighboring village Ossining, New York until 1901.) On November 21, 1902, the village of Briarcliff Manor was established.

The village is also known by several other names. It is conversationally called "Briarcliff", and often erroneously written as "Briar Cliff Manor" (although historically there has been little distinction). The village has been called "Briarcliff on the Hudson" by Mark Twain and Aileen Riggin; it is also known as "the Village of Briarcliff Manor". The name Briarcliff has also been applied to other municipalities, including the 470-person town of Briarcliffe Acres in South Carolina; in naming it, the town's founder had drawn inspiration from Briarcliff Manor's name. One of the village's mottos, "A village between two rivers", can also refer to the municipality; another official motto is a Walter Law quote, "Only the best is good enough".

=== Precolonial and colonial eras ===
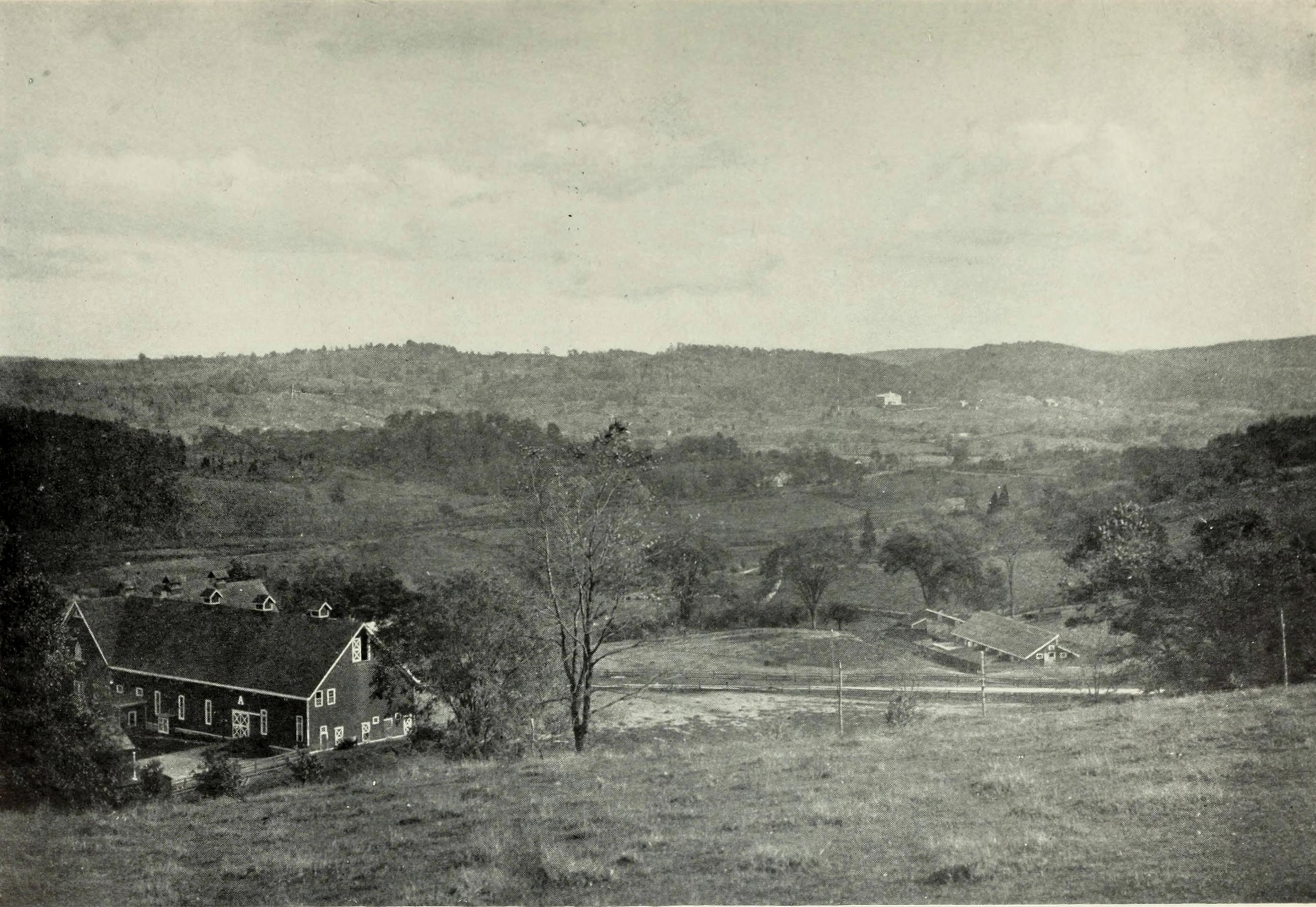
A portion of the village in 1901, with Briarcliff Farms' Barn A in the foreground and the School of Practical Agriculture in the background

The history of Briarcliff Manor can be traced back to the founding of a settlement between the Hudson and Pocantico Rivers in the 19th century. The area now known as Briarcliff Manor had seen human occupation since at least the Archaic period, but significant growth in the settlements that are now incorporated into the village did not occur until the Industrial Revolution.

In the precolonial era, the area of present-day Briarcliff Manor was inhabited by a band of the Wappinger tribes of Native Americans, known as Sint Sincks (or "Sing Sings"). They owned territory as far north as the Croton River. In the 1680s, Frederick Philipse purchased about 156,000 acres (631 km^{2}) from the Sint Sincks, and named it Philipsburg Manor. The Philipses lost their claim to the land because of the American Revolutionary War; the family, which was Loyalist, had its property confiscated in 1779. The area remained largely unsettled by colonists until after the war; in 1693, fewer than twenty families lived in the 50,000-acre (202 km^{2}) area of Westchester which included Briarcliff Manor.

=== Progressive era to present day ===
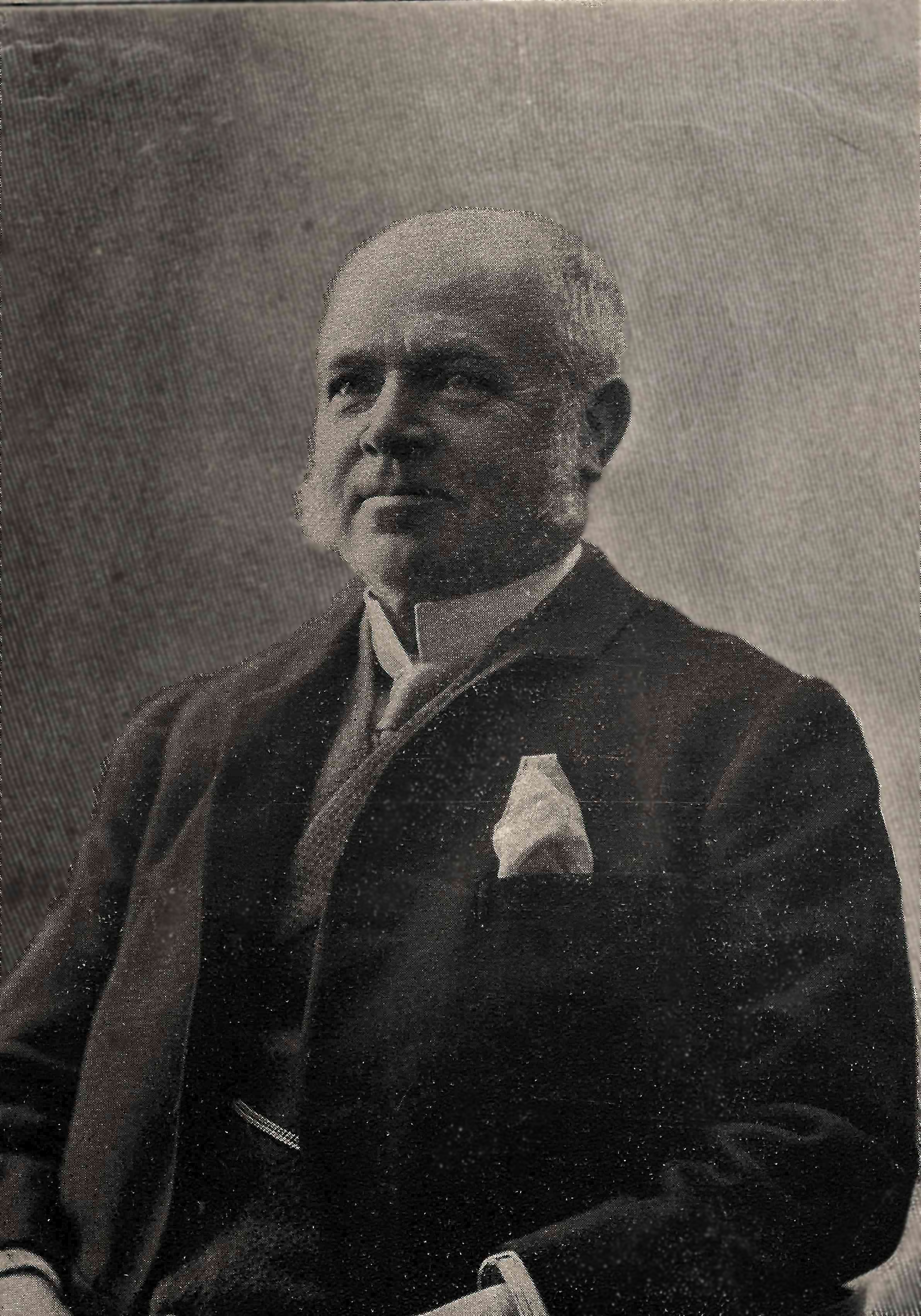
Walter William Law

After retiring as vice president of W. & J. Sloane, Walter Law moved with his family to the present Briarcliff Manor. He bought his first 236 acres (96 ha) in 1890, and then quickly expanded his property, buying about forty parcels in less than ten years; by 1900, he owned more than 5,000 acres (7.8 sq mi) of Westchester County. Law developed the village, establishing schools, churches, parks, and the Briarcliff Lodge. His employees at Briarcliff Farms moved into the village, and the population grew enough to encourage Law to establish the area as a village. A proposition was presented to the supervisors of Mount Pleasant and Ossining on October 8, 1902, that the area of 640 acres (260 ha) with a population of 331 be incorporated as the Village of Briarcliff Manor, and the village was incorporated on November 21.

The Tudor Revival-style Briarcliff Lodge was opened in 1902 as a premier resort hotel. It was surrounded by Walter Law's dairy barns and greenhouses, and hosted numerous distinguished guests, including Franklin and Eleanor Roosevelt. The lodge held the Edgewood Park School (1936–1954) and The King's College (1955–1994) before it burned to the ground on September 20, 2003.

The Briarcliff Manor Fire Department was founded on February 10, 1903, from Briarcliff Manor's first fire company, the 1901 Briarcliff Steamer Company No. 1. Scarborough was incorporated into Briarcliff Manor in 1906, and the Police Department was organized two years later. The Village Municipal Building was built in 1913 and was opened on July 4, 1914. The high school opened in 1928, and in 1946, the People's Caucus party, an organization which calls out interested residents for candidacy, was created. Briarcliff Manor celebrated its semicentennial celebration from October 10–12, 1952, publishing a book about the village and its history; that year, the Crossroads neighborhood of 84 houses was completed.

In 1953, Todd Elementary School opened to free space at the Law Park grade school. The Putnam Division of the New York Central Railroad was discontinued in 1958, and the following year the Briarcliff Manor Public Library opened in the former Briarcliff Manor train station. The village's first corporate facility (part of Philips Research) opened in 1960. In 1964 the new Village Hall opened, replacing the Municipal Building. The present high school opened in 1971 to ease the large enrollment at the grade-school building. In 1980, Pace University began leasing the middle-school building, and the middle school was moved to a portion of the new high-school building. The grade-school building was demolished in 1996, and a retirement home was built on its site the following year. The village celebrated its centennial in 2002, which involved celebratory events. A two-story addition to the village library was built in 2009, and the original portion was renovated to become the village's community center in 2016.

== Geography ==
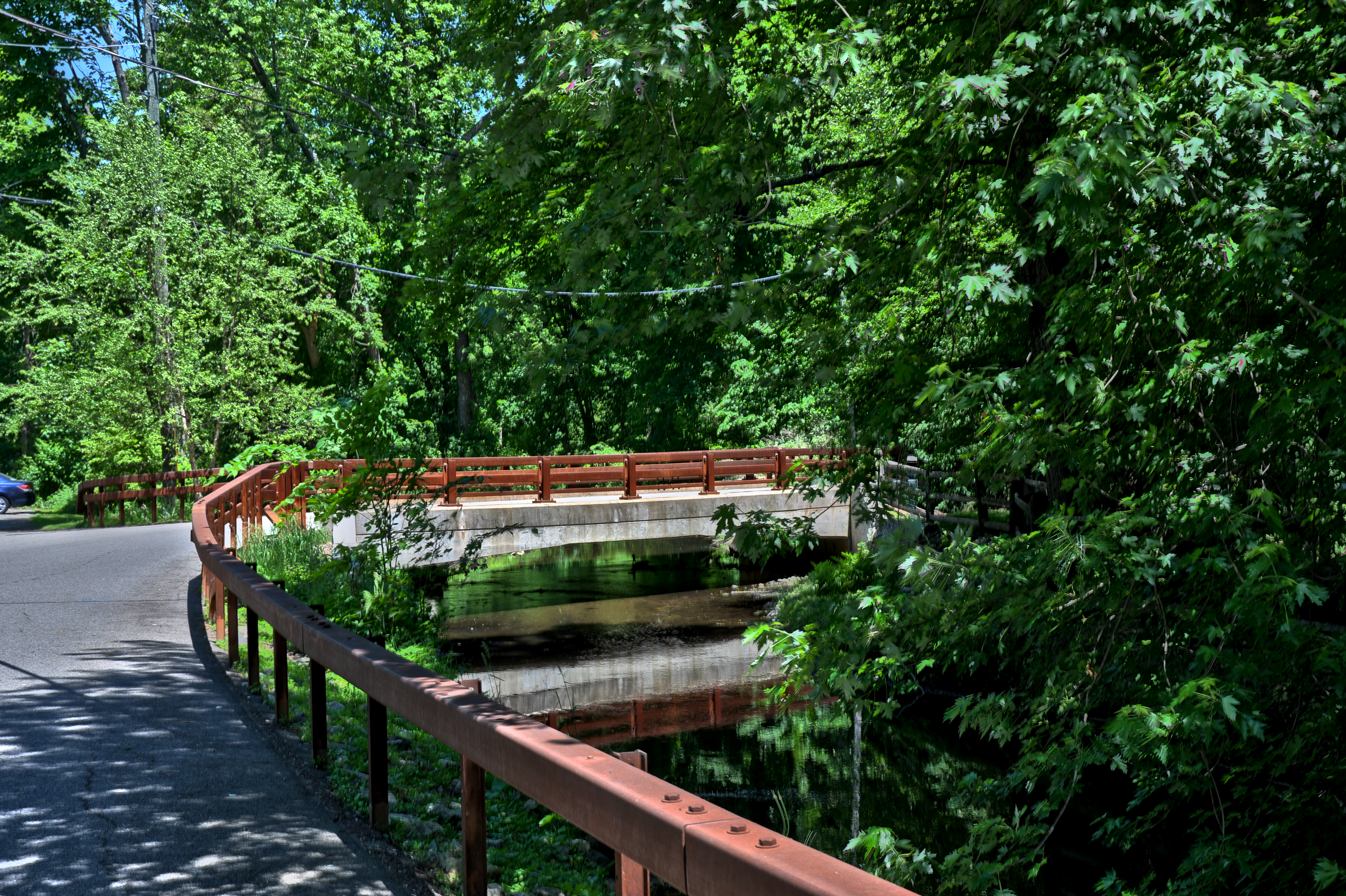
The Pocantico River as it flows under Todd Lane

Briarcliff Manor is around 30 miles (48 km) north of Manhattan. It is part of Westchester County and so part of the New York metropolitan area and the New York–Jersey City–White Plains, NY–NJ Metropolitan Division. It is on the Hudson River, just north of the Tappan Zee Bridge and south of Croton Point (near the widest part of the river) and just northwest of the county's center. According to the 2010 United States census Briarcliff Manor covers an area of 6.7 square miles (17 km^{2}), of which 5.9 square miles (15 km^{2}) is land and 0.8 square miles (2.1 km^{2}) is water.

The village is a part of the Pocantico and Saw Mill River Basin and the Lower Hudson River Drainage Basin, which leads to the Hudson west-southwest of the village. Major streams running through Briarcliff Manor include the centrally located Caney Brook, the Pocantico River, and Sparta Brook. Abundant rock outcroppings include dolomite, granite, gneiss, and mica schist. Copper and silver were once mined near Scarborough, and Briarcliff Manor's geographical area has large boulders, deposited in the last glacial period. Elevations within the village range from less than 100 feet (30 meters) above mean sea level near the Hudson River to approximately 500 feet (150 meters) above mean sea level around the center and eastern areas. The highest natural point in Briarcliff Manor is 1,200 feet (370 m) southwest of U.S. National Geodetic Survey (NGS) station mark LX4016, off Farm Road, at 533 feet (162 m) above sea level. The village, which covered 1 square mile (2.6 km^{2}) when incorporated in 1902, has expanded primarily through annexation: of Scarborough in 1906 and acreage from the town of Mount Pleasant in 1927. It is in telephone area code 914 and the postal ZIP code area 10510. Briarcliff Manor's Ossining portion takes up nearly half of the village land area, about 93 percent of its population, and 85 percent of its land parcels.

=== Climate ===
Briarcliff Manor

Climate chart (precipitation, max. and min. temperature)
J	F	M	A	M	J	J	A	S	O	N	D
3.5 35 21	3.1 39 23	4.5 47 29	4.4 58 39	4.1 68 49	4.3 77 59	3.7 82 64	4.2 80 63	4.7 73 55	4.4 62 44	4 51 36	4.3 40 27
- █ Average max. and min. temperatures in °F
- █ Precipitation totals in inches
- Source: The Weather Channel
Metric conversion
J	F	M	A	M	J	J	A	S	O	N	D
88 2 −6	79 4 −5	115 8 −2	112 14 4	105 20 9	108 25 15	94 28 18	106 27 17	120 23 13	112 17 7	101 11 2	110 4 −3
- █ Average max. and min. temperatures in °C
- █ Precipitation totals in mm

The village is in a humid continental climate zone (Köppen climate classification: Dfa), with cold, snowy winters and hot, humid summers and four distinct seasons. The United States Department of Agriculture places Briarcliff Manor in plant hardiness zone 7a. Summer high temperatures average in the lower 80s Fahrenheit (upper 20s Celsius), with lows averaging in the lower 60s F (upper 10s C). Its highest recorded temperature was 100 °F (38 °C) in 1995, and its lowest was −10 °F (−23 °C) in 1979.

Climate data for Briarcliff Manor
Month	Jan	Feb	Mar	Apr	May	Jun	Jul	Aug	Sep	Oct	Nov	Dec	Year
Record high °F (°C)	65 (18)	75 (24)	82 (28)	90 (32)	95 (35)	97 (36)	100 (38)	98 (37)	98 (37)	84 (29)	78 (26)	72 (22)	100 (38)
Mean daily maximum °F (°C)	35 (2)	39 (4)	47 (8)	58 (14)	68 (20)	77 (25)	82 (28)	80 (27)	73 (23)	62 (17)	51 (11)	40 (4)	59 (15)
Mean daily minimum °F (°C)	21 (−6)	23 (−5)	29 (−2)	39 (4)	49 (9)	59 (15)	64 (18)	63 (17)	55 (13)	44 (7)	36 (2)	27 (−3)	42 (6)
Record low °F (°C)	−9 (−23)	−10 (−23)	6 (−14)	16 (−9)	32 (0)	39 (4)	46 (8)	41 (5)	33 (1)	24 (−4)	15 (−9)	−5 (−21)	−10 (−23)
Source: The Weather Channel

=== Neighborhoods ===
The village is home to neighborhoods and business and residential areas, including the central business district, the hamlets of Scarborough and Chilmark, and residential areas Central Briarcliff West, the Tree Streets and the Crossroads.

==== Scarborough ====
Frank A. Vanderlip's Beechwood mansion

Scarborough, often called Scarborough-on-Hudson because it borders the Hudson River, is an 0.45-square-mile (1.2 km^{2}) unincorporated district divided between Briarcliff Manor and the village of Ossining, with most of the area within Briarcliff Manor and a few streets in the village of Ossining. Briarcliff Manor's portion of Scarborough was annexed into the village in 1906. The boundary between Scarborough and the rest of the village is roughly along Old Briarcliff and Sleepy Hollow Roads. The area was settled prior to the Revolutionary War. Around that time, the area included a tavern and inn at corner of Albany Post Road and Scarborough Station Road and a blacksmith shop where the Scarborough Presbyterian Church stands today. Scarborough was named after early settler William Kemey's town in England. A cove in Scarborough is named after him.

Scarborough is largely residential, and has some of the most expensive houses in the village, due in part to its proximity to the Hudson. Condominium complexes within Scarborough include Kemeys Cove, built in 1974, and Scarborough Manor, a 7-story, 205-unit complex built in the 1960s. The hamlet has a post office and a station on the Metro-North Hudson Line within walking distance of most houses in the hamlet. Unlike most of Briarcliff Manor, Scarborough is within the Ossining Union Free School District. During the 17th century, Scarborough became one of the first trading posts for the Dutch on the Hudson. During the early 20th century, the Astor, Rockefeller, and Vanderbilt families entertained guests on their river-view country estates in the Scarborough area. The Scarborough Historic District, including the Scarborough Presbyterian Church, is on the National Register of Historic Places. Across the street from the church is Sparta Cemetery, containing graves of local Revolutionary War veterans and the Leatherman. A notable building on the register is Beechwood, built in 1780 and considered one of the finest examples of Federal architecture in Westchester County. Beechwood was later purchased by Frank A. Vanderlip, who constructed the Scarborough School on the estate. The school was founded in 1913, and closed in 1978. Holly Hill is a notable house nearby. Hubert Rogers, a New York City attorney, had the house designed around 1927 by William Adams Delano; Rogers named it Weskora. After his death Brooke Astor purchased the estate, renaming it Holly Hill for its holly trees. Directly across from Holly Hill is the site used for the U.S. headquarters of Philips Research from 1965 to 2015, built on part of Waldheim, the former 130-acre (53 ha) estate of James Speyer.

Scarborough is also referred to as a hamlet called "Scarboro" located within the town of Ossining (not Briarcliff Manor) in the official New York State Gazetteer, maintained and published by the New York State Department of Health, which includes numerous defunct hamlets and towns, some with alternate or archaic spellings.

==== Chilmark ====
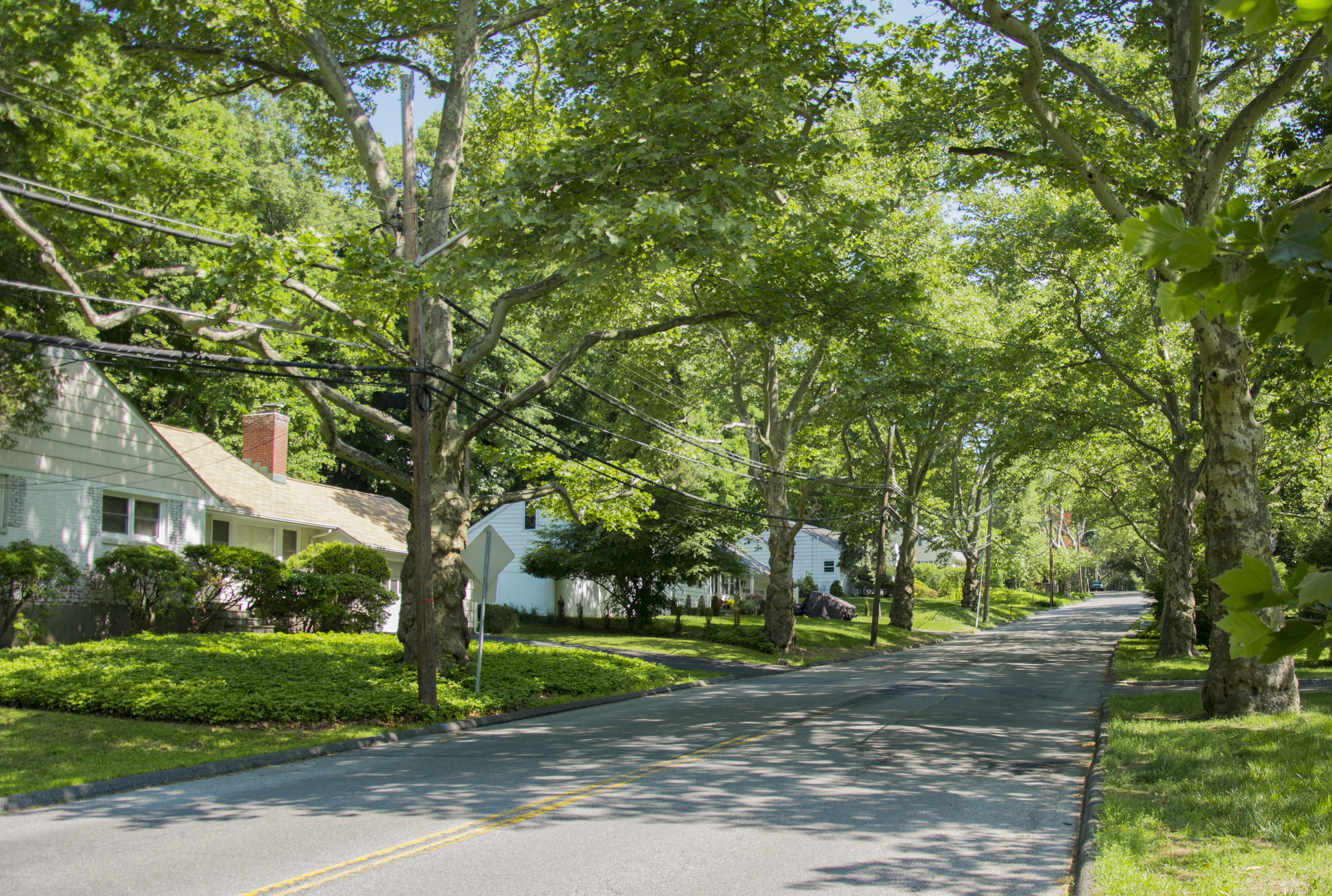
Underhill Road in Chilmark

Chilmark (also known as Chilmark Park) is an unincorporated residential community of about 300 acres (120 ha), established in 1930, in northern Briarcliff Manor. The neighborhood was designed with Underhill Road as its main thoroughfare, running north–south. It was named after the village of Chilmark, England, the birthplace and early home of Thomas Macy (an ancestor of Valentine Everit Macy), who arrived in the colonies in 1635. The area is culturally significant for its association with the Macy family, whose members were active in New York and Westchester County during the 19th and early 20th centuries. Valentine Everit Macy and his wife, Edith Carpenter Macy, founded the community and aided in its development; Macy purchased several small family farms in present Chilmark in 1897. In 1925, Macy donated 265 acres (107 ha) on Old Chappaqua Road for the first national Girl Scout camp, which later became the Edith Macy Conference Center, a conference and training facility owned and operated by the Girl Scouts of the USA. The Briarcliff Recreation Center was formerly the private Chilmark Club until the 1970s, when the village purchased the land for a recreation center and adjoining park. Macy's residence in the area was the Chilmark estate, a Tudor-style stone and stucco mansion built in 1896 with a nine-hole golf course. The neighborhood hosts Briarcliff Manor's Conservative temple Congregation Sons of Israel.

Chilmark features landscaped, winding roads designed to blend with the topography, access to transportation (including a commuter rail line and a highway and homes built in revival styles echoing Tudor and Gothic architecture; it is architecturally significant as an example of early-20th-century suburban design. During the 1920s Macy's son, V.E. Macy Jr., founded the Chilmark Park Realty Corporation to sell land parcels. When he began marketing the area, he renovated or demolished existing homes to lend an air of development and built a private 8.3-acre (3.4 ha) country club for use by Chilmark residents. The village of Briarcliff Manor later purchased the site, and operates it as Chilmark Park. To denote its development as an exclusive neighborhood, Macy planted distinctive shade trees along Underhill Road. Since its founding, additional homes have been built in Chilmark, most between 1955 and 1960. The developments expanded the area beyond its original 300 acres (120 ha); it presently comprises Underhill Road and the streets immediately adjacent to it.

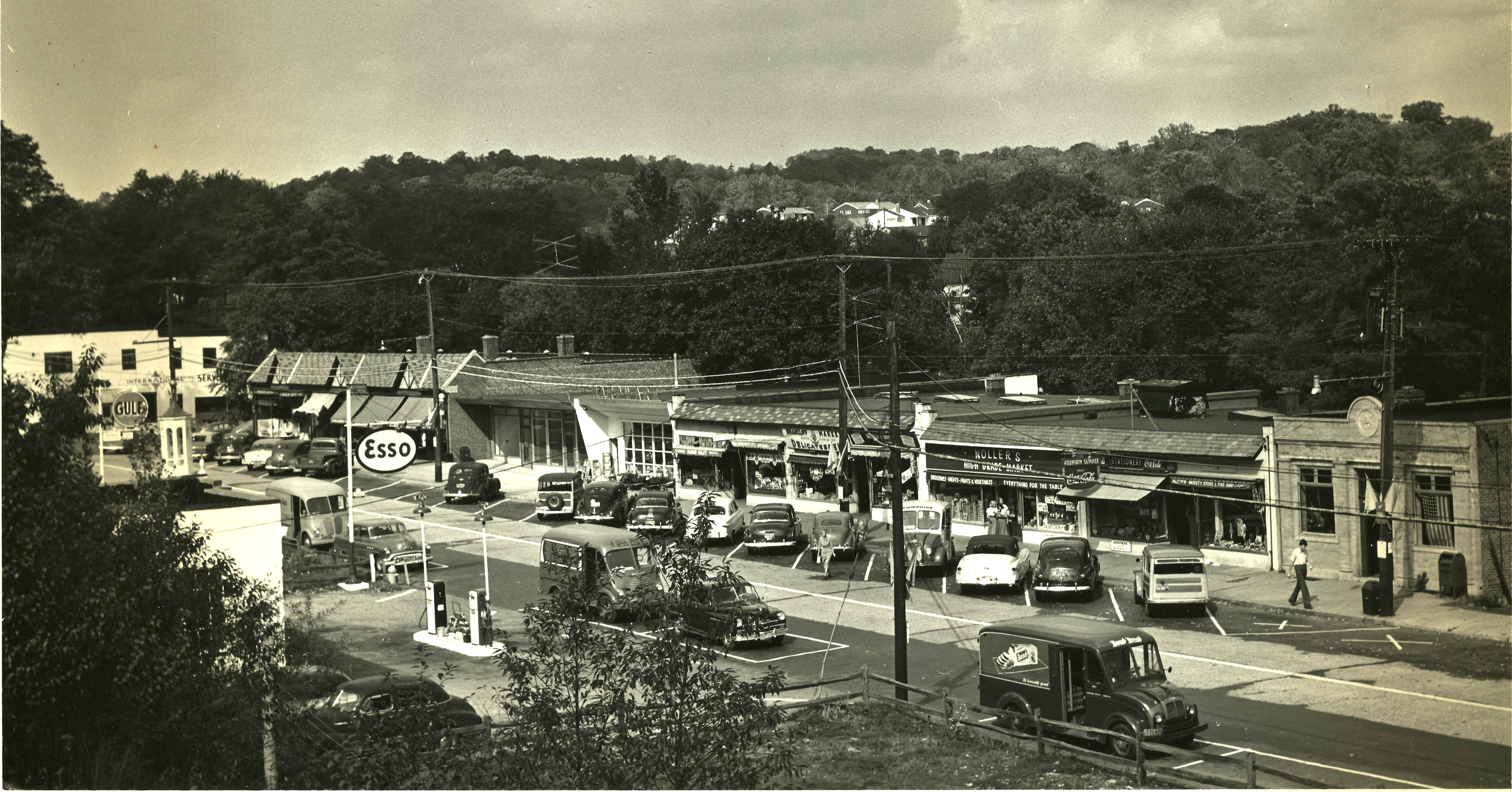
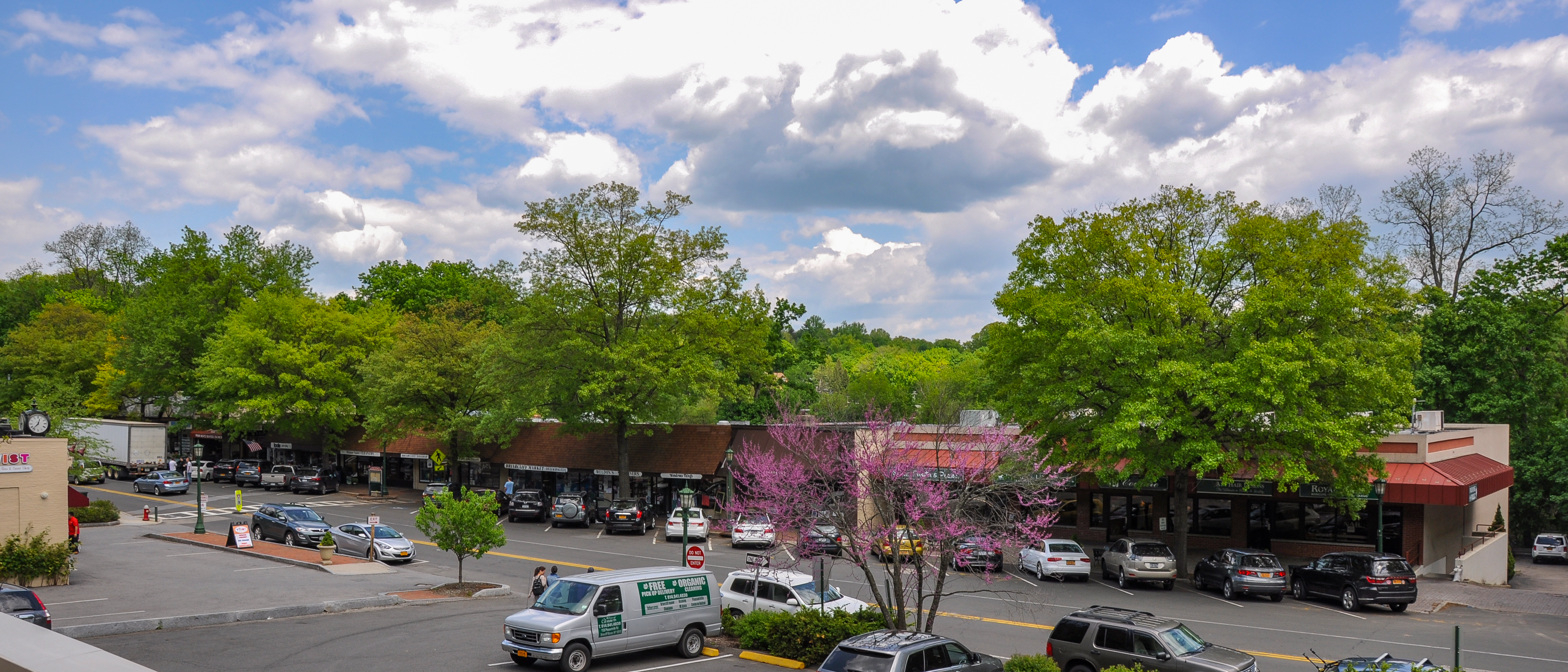
Northeast view of the village's Pleasantville Road central business district in 1952 (top) and 2014 (bottom)

==== Village Center ====
The central business district, also known as the Village Center, is located on Briarcliff Manor's main street on Pleasantville Road and continues on North State Road. The area has numerous businesses lining Pleasantville Road, a large expansion from the three stores that existed there in 1906. The business district is home to the village hall and a pocket park, and has brick sidewalks, period street lighting, and free parking. Farther south along the road is the Walter W. Law Memorial Park, and further east along the road are the three schools of the Briarcliff Manor Union Free School District. The Village Center contains a number of pre-Revolutionary War houses, including the Whitson House, built during the 1770s and the former home of Richard Whitson (one of the Whitson brothers, after whom Whitson's Corners was named); Buckhout House, also dating to the 1770s and named for the family who lived there for over a century and the oldest, Century Homestead, dating to about 1767 and first owned by Reuben Whitson. The Washburn House, another pre-Revolutionary house, was sold by the New York State Commission on Forfeiture to Joseph Washburn in 1775.

==== Central Briarcliff West ====
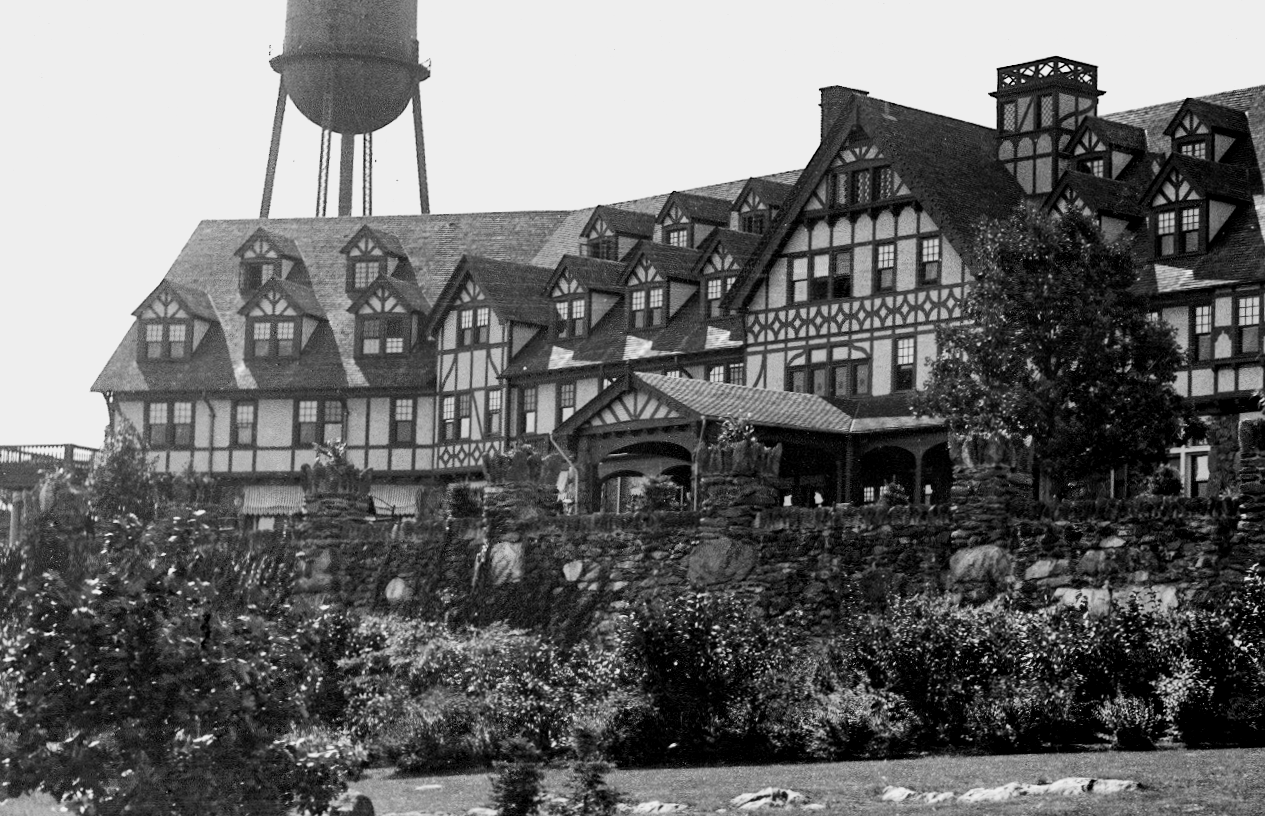
The Briarcliff Lodge, a Tudor Revival resort (c. 1905)

Central Briarcliff West is a neighborhood which has a number of mansions built by 20th-century millionaires who stayed at the Briarcliff Lodge and later built estates in the area. The lodge stood in the area and on the highest point of Walter Law's estate from its construction in 1902 until it burned down in 2003. Other historic estates in the neighborhood include the Law family homes (built in 1902 for Walter Law's children) and Law's estate, the Manor House, all on Scarborough Road. The three estates for his children are Six Gables, Mt. Vernon, and Hillcrest. The Julian Street Jr. residence, a Modernist structure designed by Wallace Harrison for Julian and Narcissa Vanderlip Street, was one of the first contemporary-style homes in Westchester. Ashridge, a large Greek Revival estate, was built around 1825.

==== The tree streets ====
The tree streets are a network of streets in the Mount Pleasant portion of the village. Several of the streets are named after regional trees, including Satinwood Lane, Larch Road, Elm Road, and Oak Road. Walter Law had rows of trees planted on streets named for the varieties, though many of these trees no longer adorn their streets. The first major development of the area occurred around 1902, though many houses in the neighborhood were constructed during a 1930s building boom, circling Jackson Road Park and near Todd Elementary School.

==== The Crossroads ====
The Crossroads is a group of 84 houses on streets named after local World War II veterans, including Schrade Road, Hazelton Circle, Matthes Road, and Dunn Lane. It was constructed at the end of World War II to provide affordable housing to returning veterans, and was completed in 1952.

== Demographics ==
=== Historical ===
Historically, Briarcliff Manor's racial composition has not changed significantly. The village has seen a decrease in its non-Hispanic white population to 86 percent in 2010, down from 92 percent in 1990. The mid- to late-20th century saw an increase in the African-American population from 2.1 to 3.4 percent.

The village has experienced significant population growth, with it and neighboring communities undergoing more rapid growth than Westchester County overall. The period from 1950 to 1970 saw the greatest increase in population, with growth leveling off since then.

Population growth since 1902
Year	1902	1910	1920	1930	1940	1950	1960	1970	1980	1990	2000	2010	2019	2020
Population	331	950	1,027	1,794	1,830	2,494	5,105	6,521	7,115	7,070	7,696	7,867	8,094	7,569
±%	—	+187.0%	+8.1%	+74.7%	+2.0%	+36.3%	+104.7%	+27.7%	+9.1%	−0.6%	+8.9%	+2.2%	+2.9%	−6.5%
Source: 1902 to 1940 • 1950 to 2000 • 2010 • 2020

=== Racial and ethnic composition ===
Briarcliff Manor village, New York – Racial and ethnic composition Note: the US Census treats Hispanic/Latino as an ethnic category. This table excludes Latinos from the racial categories and assigns them to a separate category. Hispanics/Latinos may be of any race.
Race / Ethnicity (NH = Non-Hispanic)	Pop 2000	Pop 2010	Pop 2020	% 2000	% 2010	% 2020
White alone (NH)	6,825	6,543	5,778	88.68%	83.17%	76.34%
Black or African American alone (NH)	129	247	174	1.68%	3.14%	2.30%
Native American or Alaska Native alone (NH)	3	3	8	0.04%	0.04%	0.11%
Asian alone (NH)	417	541	809	5.42%	6.88%	10.69%
Native Hawaiian or Pacific Islander alone (NH)	3	2	0	0.04%	0.03%	0.00%
Other race alone (NH)	10	6	22	0.13%	0.08%	0.29%
Mixed race or Multiracial (NH)	68	111	279	0.88%	1.41%	3.69%
Hispanic or Latino (any race)	241	414	499	3.13%	5.26%	6.59%
Total	7,696	7,867	7,569	100.00%	100.00%	100.00%

=== 2020 census ===
As of the 2020 census, Briarcliff Manor had a population of 7,569. The median age was 49.0 years. 21.9% of residents were under the age of 18 and 23.1% of residents were 65 years of age or older. For every 100 females there were 91.5 males, and for every 100 females age 18 and over there were 87.3 males age 18 and over.

100.0% of residents lived in urban areas, while 0.0% lived in rural areas.

There were 2,735 households in Briarcliff Manor, of which 34.9% had children under the age of 18 living in them. Of all households, 67.7% were married-couple households, 8.1% were households with a male householder and no spouse or partner present, and 21.8% were households with a female householder and no spouse or partner present. About 20.3% of all households were made up of individuals and 14.0% had someone living alone who was 65 years of age or older.

There were 3,065 housing units, of which 10.8% were vacant. The homeowner vacancy rate was 0.8% and the rental vacancy rate was 38.0%.

Racial composition as of the 2020 census
Race	Number	Percent
White	5,895	77.9%
Black or African American	184	2.4%
American Indian and Alaska Native	16	0.2%
Asian	814	10.8%
Native Hawaiian and Other Pacific Islander	0	0.0%
Some other race	131	1.7%
Two or more races	529	7.0%

=== 2010 census ===
In the 2010 United States census there were 7,867 people, 2,647 households, and 2,037 families living in 2,753 housing units. Of the 2,647 households, 39.7 percent had children under age 18 living with them; 68.5 percent were married couples living together, 6.6 percent were headed by women, 1.9 percent were single males and 23 percent were non-families. Twenty-one percent of all households were individuals, with 14.1 percent age 65 or older. Average household size was 2.71; average family size was 3.16, with a median age of 43.4 years.

The village's population density was 1,319.5 inhabitants per square mile (509.5/km^{2}). In 2010, its racial composition was 82.7 percent white, 3.3 percent African American, 0.1 percent Native Hawaiian or Pacific Islander, 8.5 percent Asian American, and 3.1 percent from two (or more) races. Hispanic and Latino Americans made up 8.2 percent of the population.

=== Modern ===
Briarcliff Manor is primarily non-commercial, with over 80 percent of village land residential. Approximately 99% of the buildings are residential; of these, 85.3% are single-family units.

=== Demographic estimates ===
The 2015 American Community Survey (ACS) reported 50 households held by unmarried partners. Of these, 34 were female householder and male partner households and 16 were male householder and male partner households. No male householder and female partner households or female householder and female partner households were reported.

=== Income and poverty ===
The 2015 ACS estimated median household income at $141,170 and median family income was $183,047. Males had a median income of $124,000, with $82,660 for females; per capita income was $76,256. About 1.3 percent of families and 2.2 percent of the overall population were below the poverty line, along with 0.9 percent for those under 18 and 4.8 percent for those 65 or over.

=== Language and ancestry ===
The 2015 ACS also reported English as the primary language spoken at home, with 84.8 percent only speaking the language, followed by Spanish at 4.9 percent, and 10.3 percent primarily speaking other languages. Ancestry is primarily Italian and Irish, at 18.1 and 12.9 percents respectively, followed by American at 8.8, Russian at 8.5 and German at 8.4 percent.

=== Religion ===
Exact numbers on religious denominations in Briarcliff Manor are not readily available. Demographic statistics in the United States depend heavily on the United States Census Bureau, which cannot ask about religious affiliation as part of its decennial census. It does compile some national and statewide religious statistics, but these are not representative of a municipality the size of Briarcliff Manor. One report from 2010 offers religious affiliations for Westchester County. According to the data, 59.3% of county residents identified as Christian: 50.9% are Roman Catholic, 5.9% are mainline Protestants, 2% are Evangelical Protestants, and .5% are Eastern or Oriental Orthodox Christians. Residents who practice Judaism make up 10.1% of the population and practitioners of other faiths represent .9%. Note that these values are county-wide; municipal values could be significantly different.

== Economy ==
Briarcliff Manor
Employment by industry, 2014
Industry	Employment	Percentage
Education and health care	919	26.5%
Professional, scientific, management	811	23.4%
Finance, insurance, real estate	522	15.1%
Retail and wholesale trade	423	12.2%
Arts, entertainment, recreation, food services	268	7.7%
Manufacturing	144	4.2%
Other services	116	3.3%
Information	110	3.2%
Construction	72	2.1%
Public administration	36	1.0%
Agriculture and resource-based	24	6.9%
Transportation, warehousing, utilities	18	0.5%
Total	3,463	100%

About five percent of Briarcliff Manor's land is occupied by businesses. The village has three retail business areas, a general (non-retail) business area and scattered office buildings and laboratories. The village's principal retail district is along Pleasantville and North State Roads.

The central business district primarily has retailers such as restaurants, cafes, small food markets, and specialty shops. The North State Road business district has a supermarket, a bank, a gas station, and a mixture of retail stores, and the other retail areas have national and local stores. The village has small offices and larger offices for the regional (or national) market, which were formerly housed by companies including Sony Electronics, Philips Research, and Wüsthof.

The village economy depends on education, health care and social services. Of the population aged 16 and older, 63 percent are in the labor force; 33 percent of those employed work outside Westchester County. About 13 percent of workers live and work in the village, and the average commute is 37.1 minutes. The unemployment rate for those 16 and older is 4.2%, while the unemployment rate for those aged 20 to 64 is 3.0%. Briarcliff Manor has a number of wealthy residents, and was rated 19th on CNNMoney's 25 Top-Earning Towns in the U.S. An assessment by financial news corporation 24/7 Wall St., using data from the U.S. Census Bureau's American Community Survey from 2006 to 2010, rated the village's school district the fifth-wealthiest in the United States and the third-wealthiest in New York.

In 2004, the top five employers in Briarcliff Manor were the Briarcliff Manor Union Free School District, Philips Research, Trump National Golf Club, the Clear View School, and engineering firm Charles H. Sells. Other large employers were USI Holdings (a publicly traded insurer headquartered in the village), Atria Briarcliff Manor, Pace University, and the village (which employs 81 people).

== Arts and culture ==
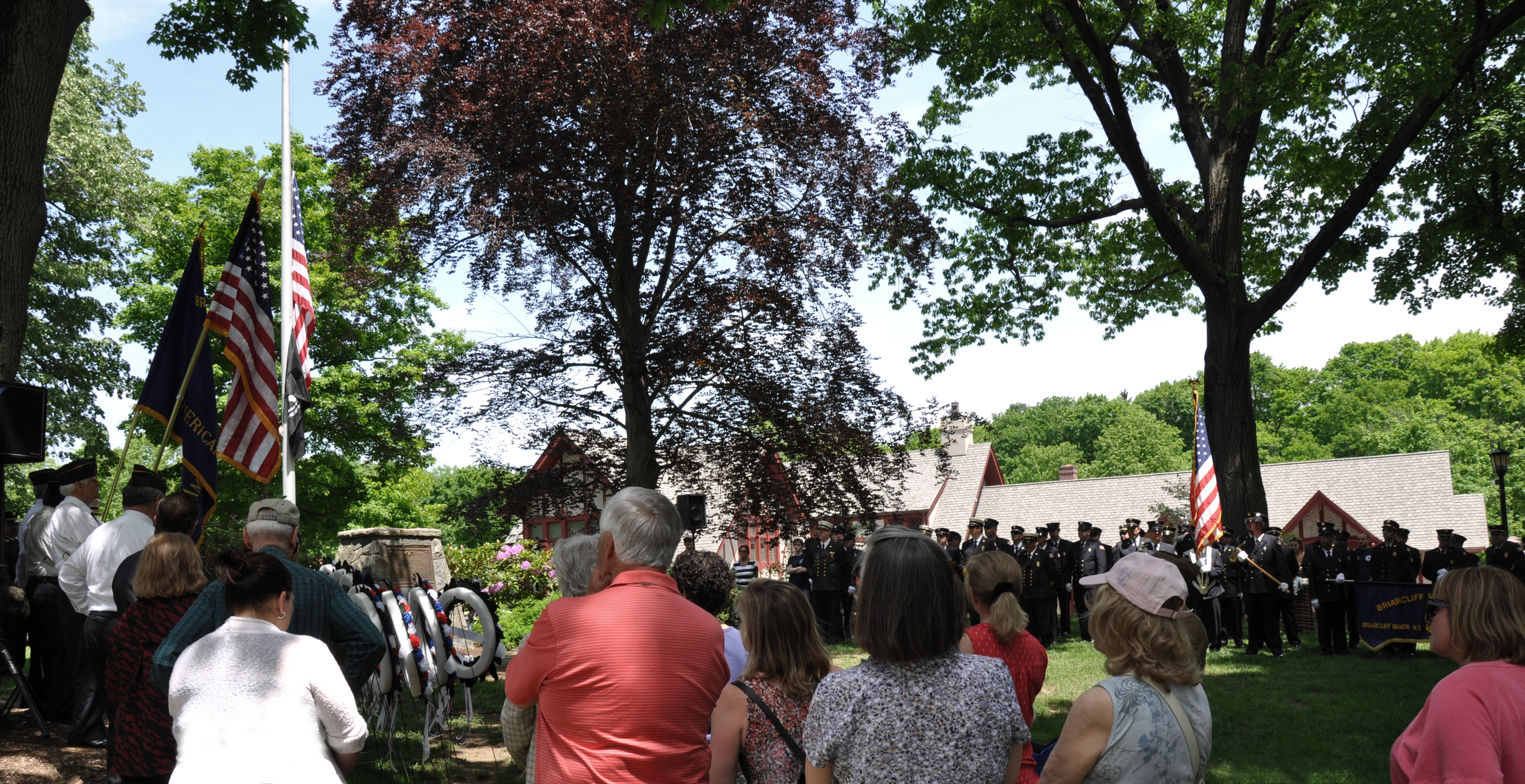
American Legion and BMFD members alongside village residents at the annual Memorial Day ceremony

The village symbol is the Briarcliff Rose, a more brightly colored offshoot of the American Beauty rose. Since 2006, the Briarcliff Rose has been used on village street signs. The Briarcliff Manor Garden Club, which also uses the Briarcliff rose as their symbol, was established in 1956. One of its primary functions is in planting, maintaining, and improving public gardens and grounds.

Briarcliff Manor has groups in several Scouting organizations, including Cub Scout Pack 6 and Boy Scout Troop 18. Pack 6 became the first Cub Scout pack in the village at its establishment in 1968; by 2002 it had over 70 cubs in 12 dens. The village's first Boy Scout troop was Troop 1 Briarcliff, founded before 1919. Sources cite Bill Buffman as the first Scoutmaster and John Hersey as the troop's first Eagle Scout. The first Girl Scout troop in the village was founded in 1917 by Louise Miller and Mrs. Alfred Jones, and the first Brownie troop was founded in 1929.

The Briarcliff Manor Community Bonfire is a winter holiday event at Law Park, hosted by the village and the Briarcliff Friends of the Arts, involving live music (primarily seasonal and holiday songs), refreshments, and craft projects for children. Another annual community event is the Memorial Day parade, a tradition in Briarcliff Manor for more than fifty years. Before the parade begins, the Municipal Building's bell is rung to commemorate firefighters who have died in the previous year; the parade ends at the village's war memorial in Law Park, where wreaths are laid on the monument. The holiday has been celebrated in the village since the early 1900s, though initially involving large family picnics, with parades reserved for the Fourth of July.

=== Historical society ===
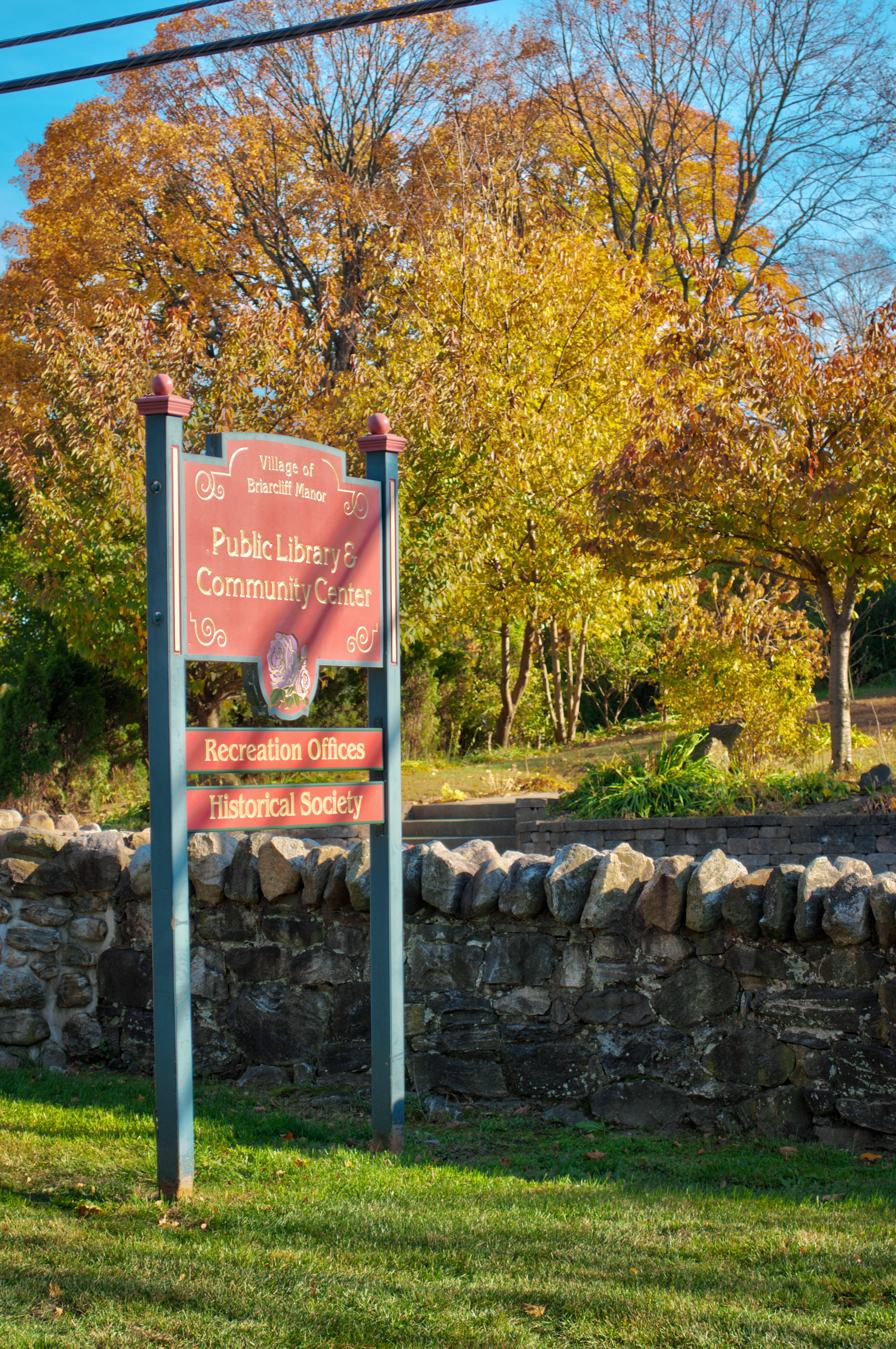
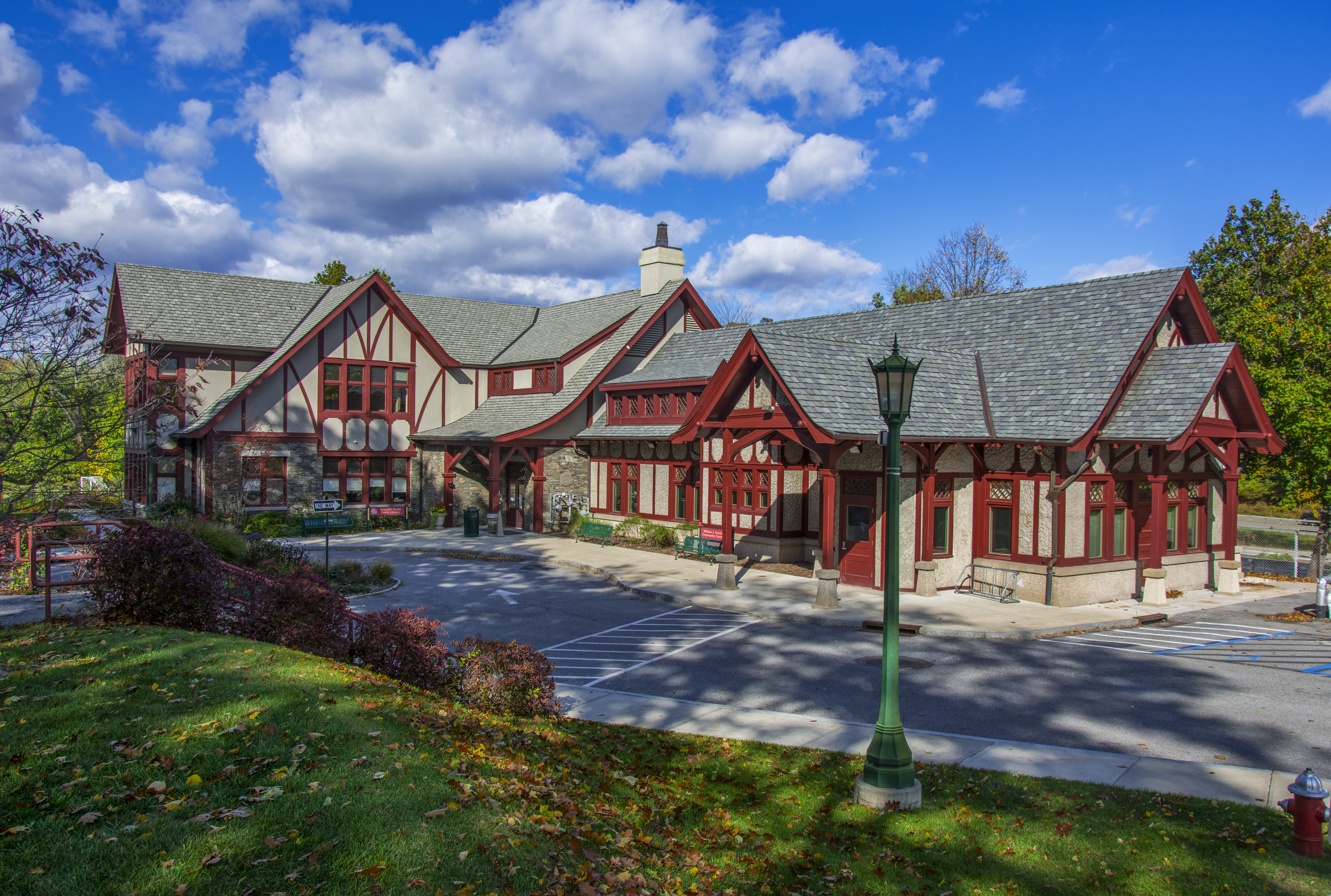
The Briarcliff Manor Public Library is home to the Briarcliff Manor-Scarborough Historical Society

At The Briarcliff Lodge
A song performed at the Centennial Variety Show, by Carmino Ravosa

Briarcliff Manor maintains strong ties to its history and traditions. During Briarcliff Manor's 1952 semicentennial, nine people served on the Historical Committee and published a village history book. In March 1974, after the mayor appointed twelve people for a 75th anniversary committee, the committee began by forming the Briarcliff Manor-Scarborough Historical Society (BMSHS). The historical society published an updated village history (A Village Between Two Rivers: Briarcliff Manor) in 1977, marking the 75th anniversary of the village. The historical society was initially located at the since-demolished Briarcliff Middle School building; it later moved to the second floor of a realty building on Pleasantville Road, and moved back to the school building after it was leased by Pace University. On March 21, 2010, the BMSHS was given a permanent location at the Eileen O'Connor Weber Historical Center, established as part of the expanded Briarcliff Manor Public Library. Members of the historical society joined the nine-member Centennial Committee in 2002 to organize events for Briarcliff Manor's centennial.

The Centennial Committee and BMSHS helped organize several events for the village's 2002 centennial celebration, including the Centennial Variety Show at the Briarcliff High School auditorium in a sold-out two-night run on April 26–27, 2002. The two-act show consisted of interpretations of village life by village organizations and a revue of Briarcliff Manor history in skits and songs. Other society-sponsored events have included tours of homes and churches, bus tours, Hudson River cruises on historic boats such as the M/V Commander (built in 1917 and listed on the national and state registers of historic places), dances, antique-car exhibits, day trips to historic points of interest, art exhibits, and events with authors and elected officials.

=== Historic sites ===
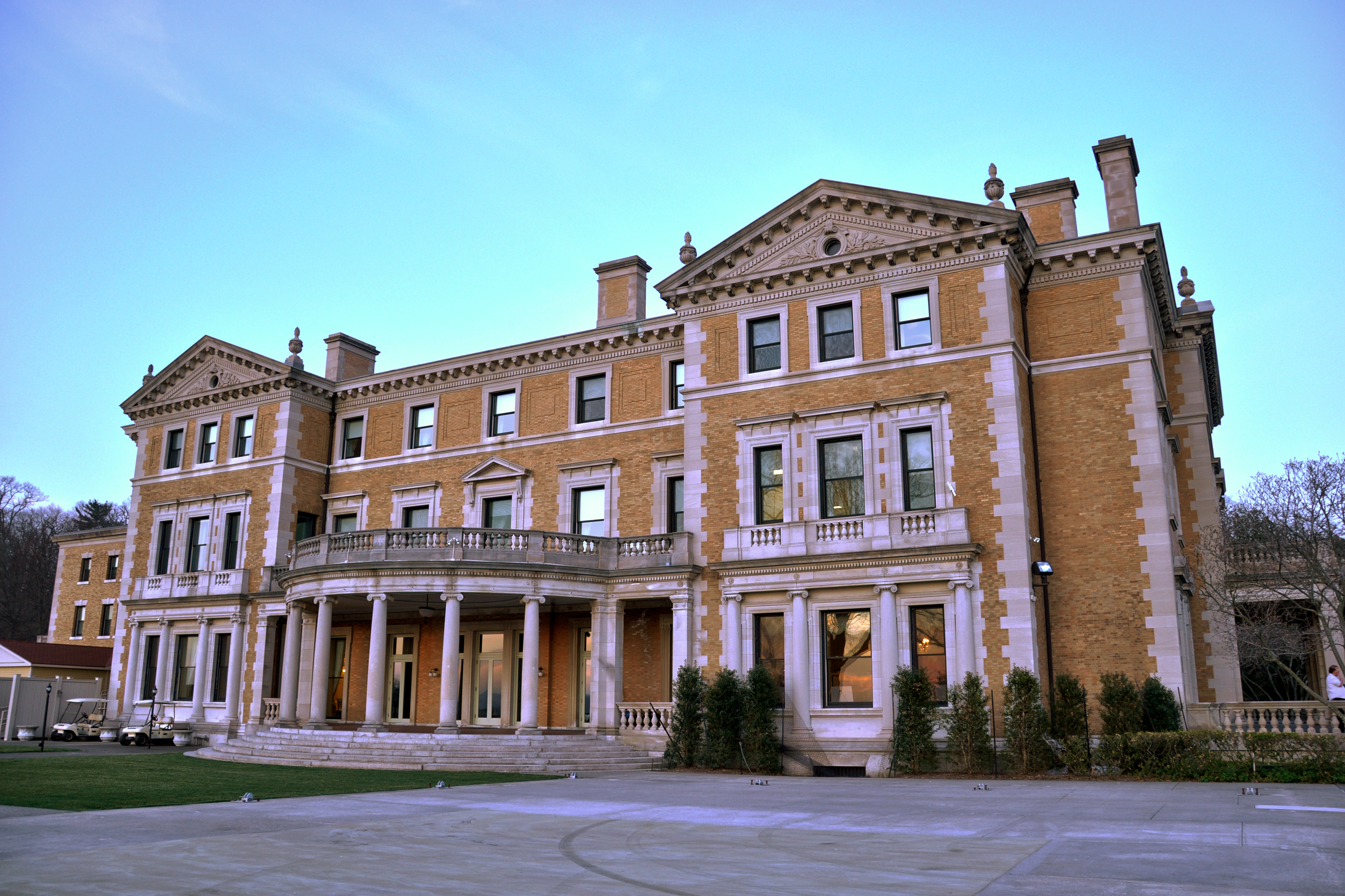
The 1895 McKim, Mead & White–designed mansion Woodlea

Briarcliff Manor is home to a number of historic buildings and districts. Buildings on the National Register of Historic Places include All Saints' Episcopal Church (added May 14, 2002), Carrie Chapman Catt's house Juniper Ledge (added March 4, 2006) and several structures in the 376-acre (152 ha) Scarborough Historic District (added September 7, 1984). Part of the Old Croton Aqueduct State Historic Park, controlled by the New York State Office of Parks, Recreation and Historic Preservation, lies within the village. The Old Croton Aqueduct is on the National Register and is a National Historic Landmark.

Although Catt's house Juniper Ledge is within Briarcliff Manor's postal boundaries, the property is located within the municipal boundaries of the nearby town of New Castle. Briarcliff Manor composer and historian Carmino Ravosa initiated the house's preservation by researching and initiating the nomination of Juniper Ledge to the National Register.

=== Houses of worship ===
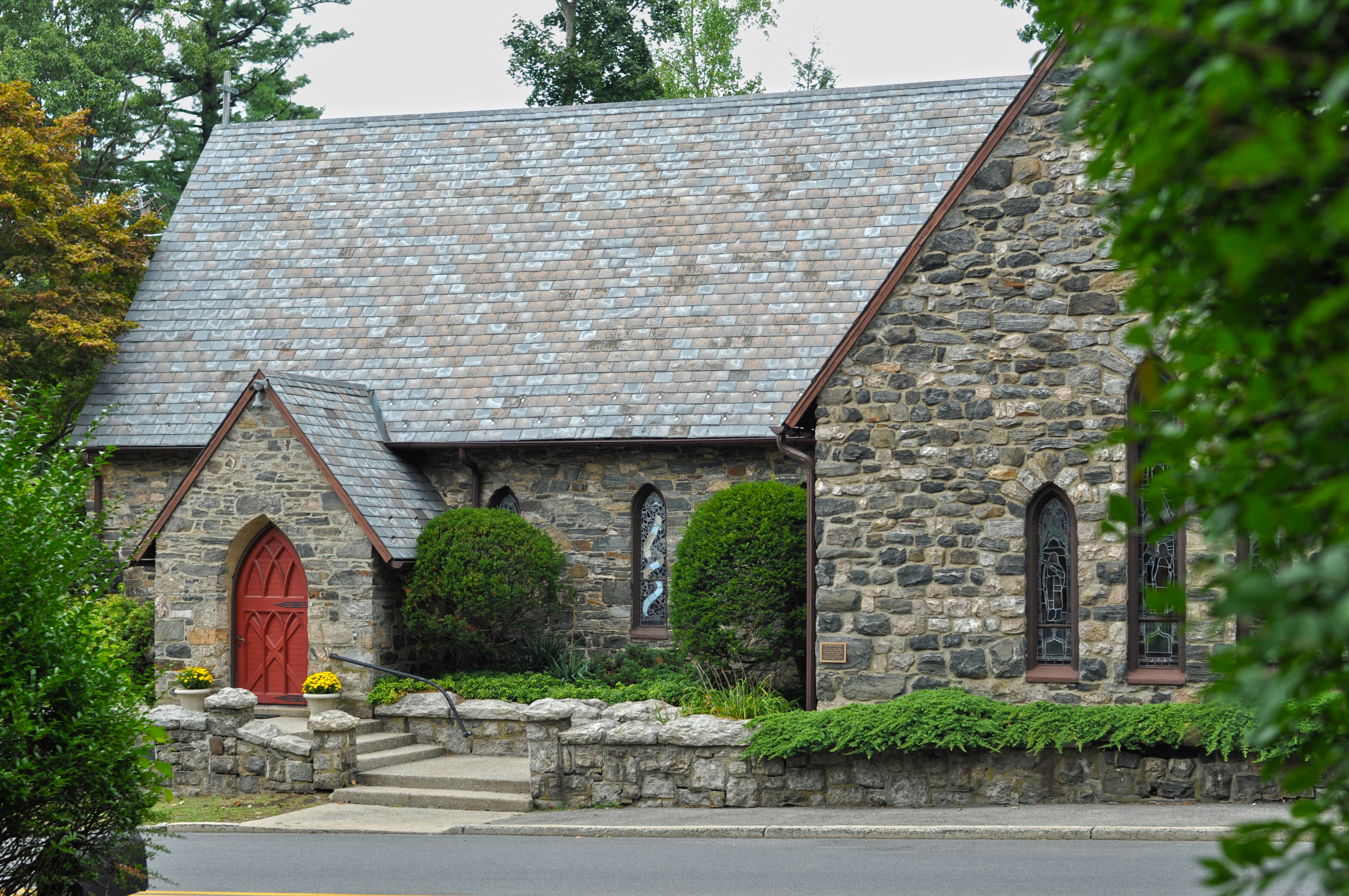
All Saints' Episcopal Church

Briarcliff Manor is home to seven Christian churches and two synagogues; three churches (Holy Innocents Anglican Church, Saint Mary's Church and Scarborough Presbyterian Church) are in Scarborough. Other churches in the village are All Saints' Episcopal Church, St. Theresa's Catholic Church, Faith Lutheran Brethren Church, and Briarcliff Congregational Church (United Church of Christ). Jewish synagogues Congregation Sons of Israel and Chabad Lubavitch of Briarcliff Manor & Ossining are in Chilmark.

Saint Mary's Episcopal Church, founded in 1839 by William Creighton as Saint Mary's Church, Beechwood, is Briarcliff Manor's oldest church; it was reincorporated in 1945 as Saint Mary's Church of Scarborough. The granite church was built by local stonemasons and paid for by Creighton's wealthy neighbors, including Commodore Matthew Perry, James Watson Webb, William Aspinwall, and Ambrose Kingsland. The church is in near-original condition, with a design based on the 14th-century Gothic St. Mary's parish church in Scarborough, England and the only church with a complete set of William Jay Bolton stained-glass windows. The church, built in 1851, is a contributing property to the National Register-listed Scarborough Historic District. The 338-acre (137 ha) Sleepy Hollow Country Club surrounds the church grounds on three sides. Notable parishioners included Commodore Matthew C. Perry and Washington Irving. Irving, author of "Rip Van Winkle" and "The Legend of Sleepy Hollow", brought the ivy surrounding the church from Abbotsford (home of Walter Scott). On July 5, 2015, Saint Mary's Episcopal Church closed after 175 years in operation; the Church of South India's Congregation of the Hudson Valley moved in that November.

Scarborough Presbyterian Church, given to the community by Margaret Louisa Vanderbilt Shepard and her husband Colonel Elliott Fitch Shepard (who lived on the nearby Woodlea estate), was the first church in the United States with an electric organ. Built in 1895 and designed by Augustus Haydel (a nephew of Stanford White) and Shepard (a nephew of Elliott Shepard)—who designed the 1899 Fabbri Mansion in Manhattan—the 3-acre (1.2 ha) church property is also part of the Scarborough Historic District.

All Saints' Episcopal Church is a stone church also on the National Register of Historic Places. It was founded in 1854 by John David Ogilby, whose summer estate and family home in Ireland were the namesakes of Briarcliff Manor. The Gothic Revival church, built on Ogilby's summer estate, was designed by Richard Upjohn and modeled on Saint Andrew's in Bemerton, England. The church, with an 1883 Stick style rectory and 1904 Arts and Crafts-style parish hall, is an example of the modest English Gothic parish church popular in the region during the mid-19th century.

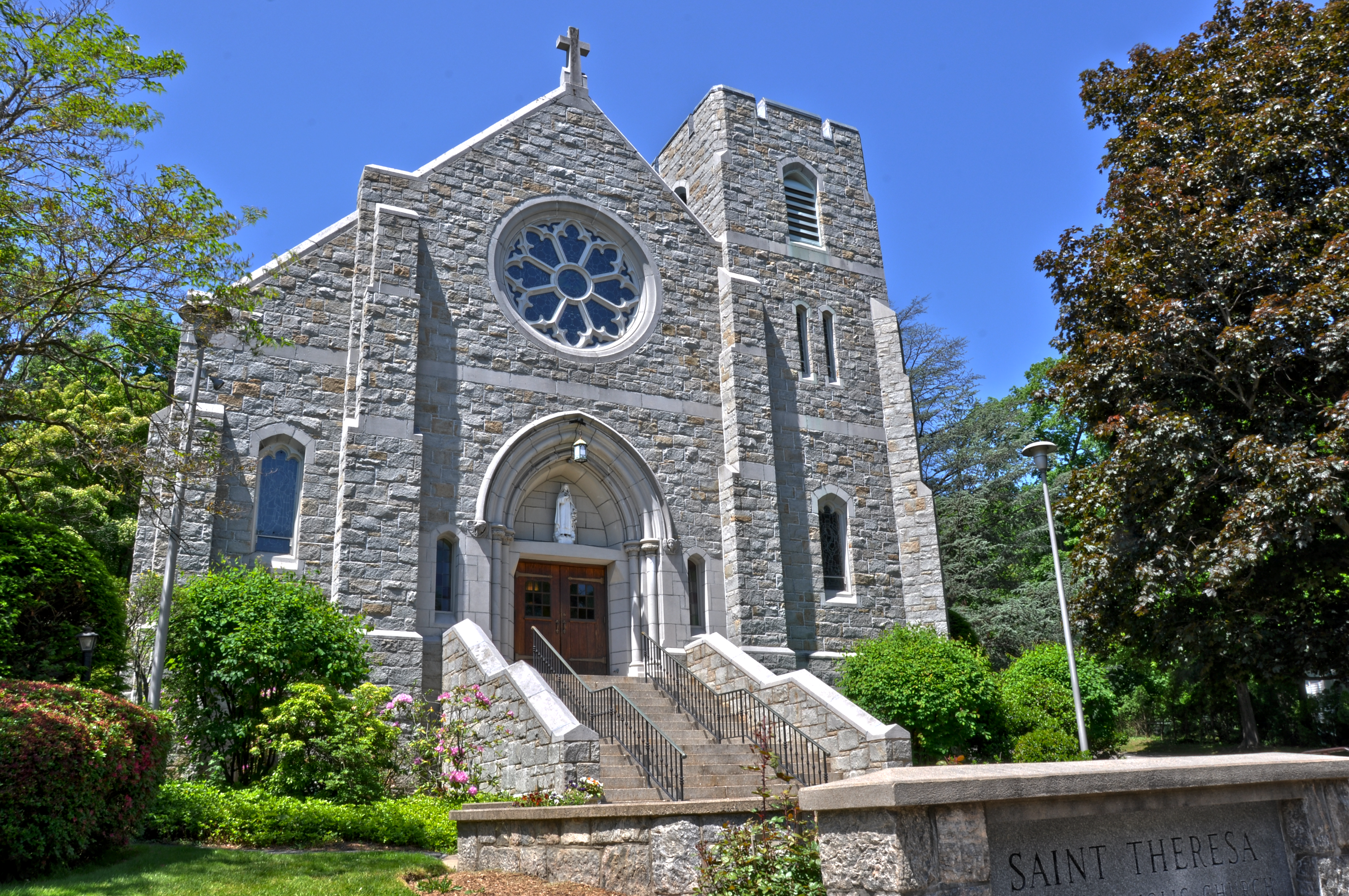
St. Theresa's Catholic Church

The parish of St. Theresa's Catholic Church was established in 1926 with thirty-six families, and the present church was dedicated on September 23, 1928. The rectory of the church was the original farmhouse of Briarcliff Farms.

Faith Lutheran Brethren Church had its 1959 beginning in a white chapel in Scarsdale. Its congregation then sold the chapel and moved to its 2-acre (0.8 ha) current site in Briarcliff Manor. The church, built largely through volunteer labor by the congregation's twelve families, held its first service on October 8, 1967. A nursery-school program, the Little School, began in 1972 and the church also sponsors women's and youth groups.

Briarcliff Congregational Church, built in 1896, has windows by Louis Comfort Tiffany, William Willet, J&R Lamb Studios, Hardman & Co., and Woodhaven. The church began in a small, one-room schoolhouse (known as the "white school"), built around 1865 and used as a school, a religious school, and a house of worship for up to 60 people. In 1896, George A. Todd Jr. asked Walter Law to support the construction of a new church. Law donated the church land, making his new church a Congregational one so the entire community (regardless of religious background) could attend. The nave and a Norman-style tower were built first, in an English-parish style with Gothic windows. When the congregation outgrew the church, Law funded a northern section (including transepts and apse) which was dedicated in 1905. He donated the church organ (replacing it in 1924), four Tiffany windows, and the manse across the street. The church housed a weekly indoor farmers' market at its parish house from 2008 to 2011, when the market was moved to Pace University's Briarcliff Campus.

Congregation Sons of Israel, self-described as egalitarian and Conservative, was the first synagogue in Briarcliff Manor. The congregation was formed in 1891 by eleven men in Ossining, and until 1902 services were held in homes and stores. That year, the congregation (now twenty-three families) purchased a building on Durston Avenue; the Jewish Cemetery, established in 1900 on Dale Avenue, is still in use. In 1920, the synagogue, numbering forty-five families, established a religious school. After outgrowing its facilities, it purchased a site on Waller Avenue and completed a new synagogue in 1922. During the 1950s the congregation purchased the 11-acre (4.5 ha) Mead Farm on Pleasantville Road, which it has used since 1960.

Chabad Lubavitch of Briarcliff Manor & Ossining was established around 2004, and is located on Orchard Road in Chilmark. On March 18, 2015, the organization purchased a building previously owned by the Ossining Heights United Methodist Church, on Campwoods Road in the village of Ossining. Chabad Lubavitch plans to renovate the building significantly before making it its first permanent synagogue.

== Sports ==
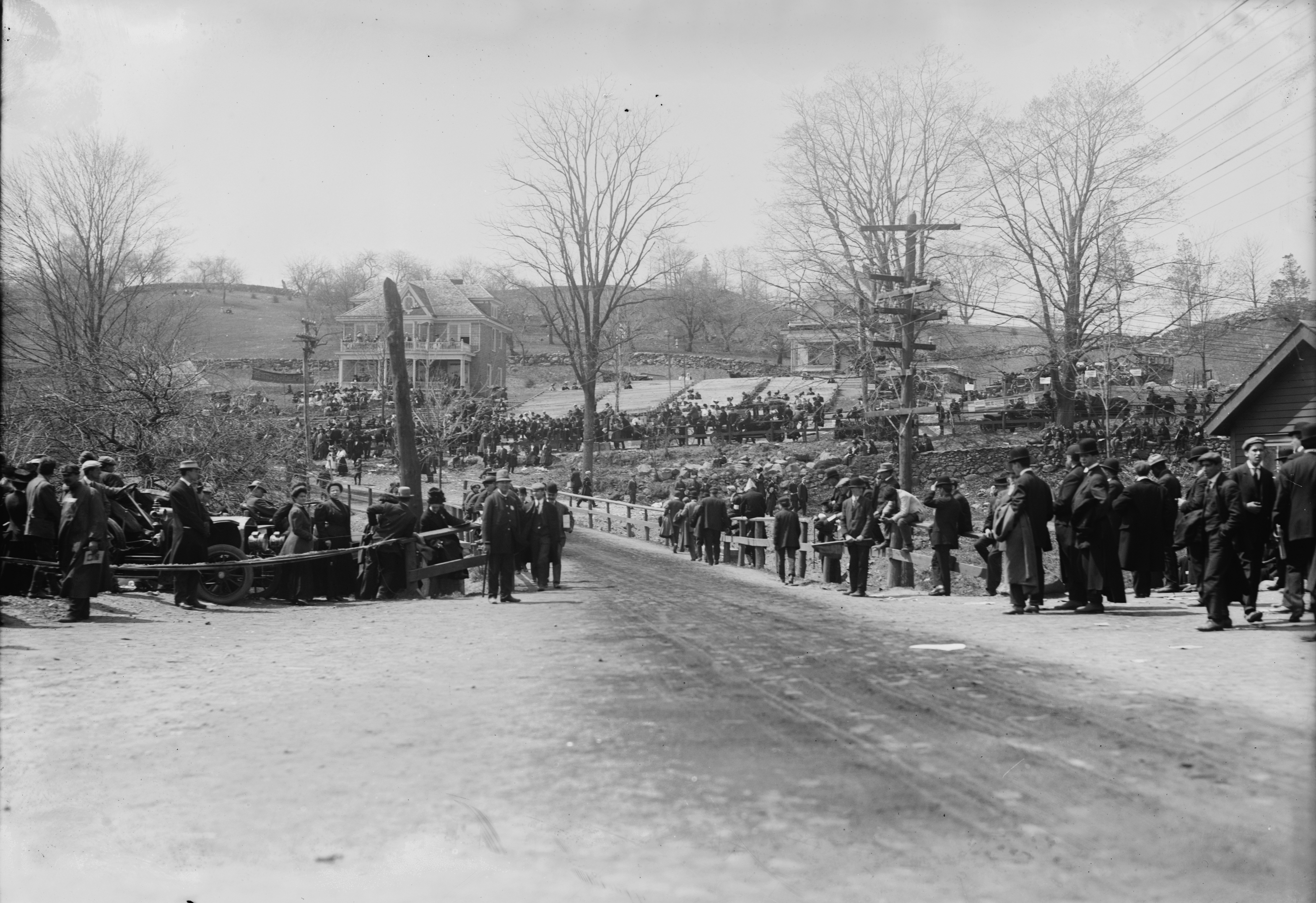
Spectators in the village center, gathered for the 1908 race

Briarcliff High School offers intramural sports and fields junior varsity and varsity teams in sixteen sports as the Briarcliff Bears. During the 38 years that Pace University operated its Briarcliff campus, it maintained fourteen intercollegiate varsity sports teams which played at the National Collegiate Athletic Association's (NCAA) Division II level.

Briarcliff Manor has a history of auto racing. The First American International Road Race was hosted by the village on April 24, 1908. The course went throughout Westchester, starting and finishing in Briarcliff Manor. The prize trophy donated by Walter Law was valued at $10,000 ($358,300 in 2025). The winner, Lewis Strang in an Isotta Fraschini, covered the 259 miles (417 km) in five hours and fourteen minutes. More than 300,000 people watched the race throughout Westchester County, and the village had more than 100,000 visitors that day.

On November 12, 1934, the Automobile Racing Club of America (precursor of the current Sports Car Club of America) held another road race in Briarcliff Manor. It was the first amateur race in the United States, hosted by the wealthy Collier family of nearby Pocantico Hills. Brothers Sam, Miles, and Barron Jr. had begun hosting informal races in the area in the early 1930s, and formed the racing club on the Collier family estate in Pocantico Hills in 1933. The 1934 race was won by Langdon Quimby, driving a Willys 77, in a time of two hours and seven minutes on the 100-mile (160 km) course. The race was held again on June 23, 1935; Quimby won again, four minutes faster than the previous year. In 1977, during the village's 75th anniversary, fifteen old racing cars participated in a motorcade around the 1934 race's route. In 2008, the village commemorated the first race's centennial in a parade featuring about 60 antique cars.

== Parks and recreation ==
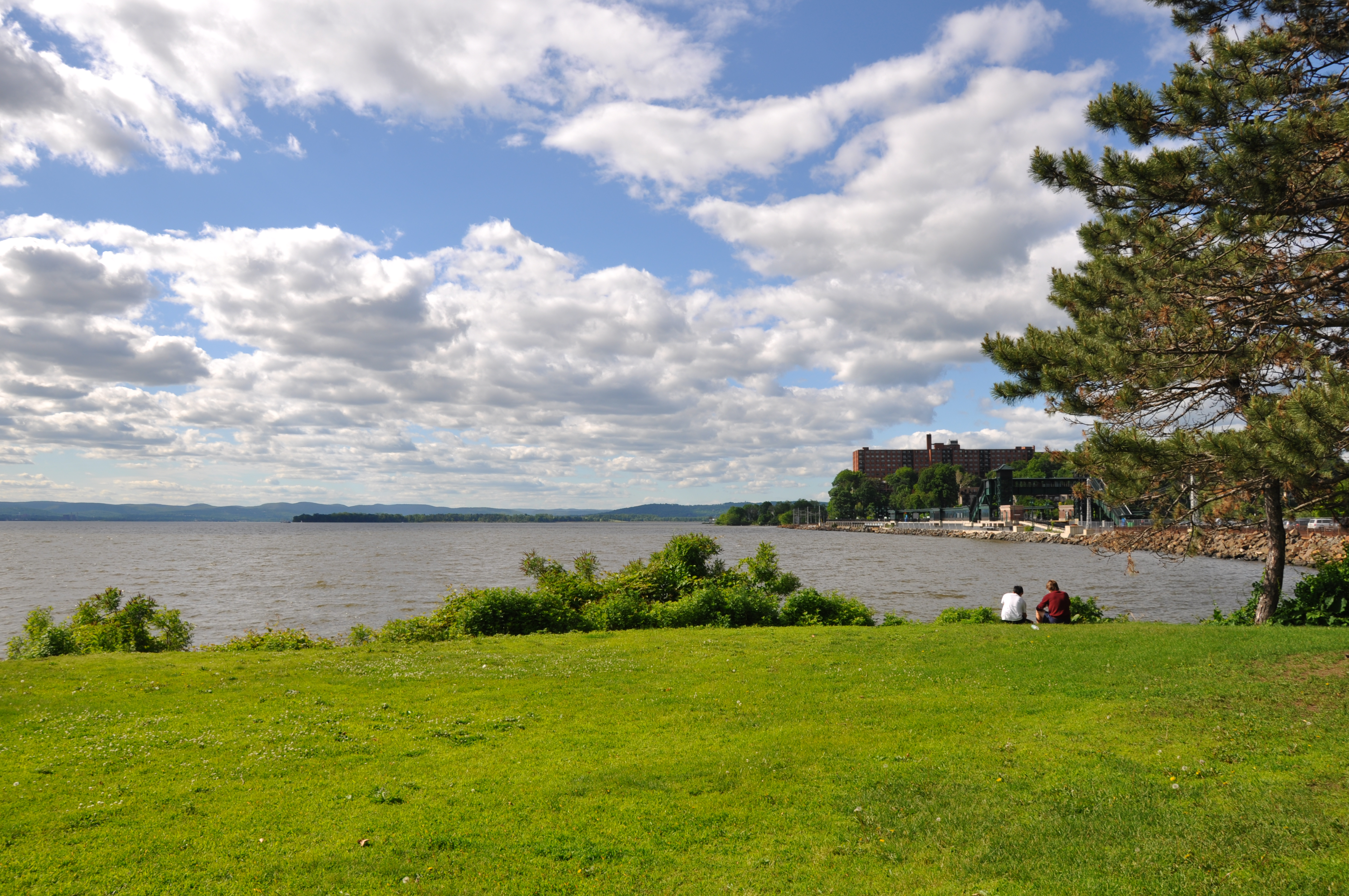
Scarborough Park

Pavilion and public swimming pools at Law Memorial Park

Briarcliff Manor has about 180 acres (70 ha) of recreational facilities and parks, all of which are accessible to the public. The village's library houses its recreation department, which has four staff and a six-member advisory committee, and provides recreation programming for the village. The village's Department of Public Works maintains the village's parks and recreational facilities with one parks foreman and two groundskeeping personnel. The following are available to Briarcliff Manor residents:

- The 12-mile (19 km) Briarcliff-Peekskill Trailway runs from the village to the Blue Mountain Reservation in Peekskill. The parkland was acquired for use by the Briarcliff–Peekskill Parkway (now part of New York State Route 9A); the parkway later changed course, freeing the land for trail use.
- Chilmark Park, 8.3 acres (3.4 ha) on Macy Road, formerly the Chilmark Country Club. The park has six tennis courts (two clay, two all-weather, and two green clay), a half-court basketball court, a soccer field, a baseball-softball field, and a playground. Renovation of the athletic fields and basketball court and the addition of a restroom are planned.
- The Hardscrabble Wilderness Area is a 235-acre (95 ha) network of wilderness trails.
- The 4.76-acre (1.93 ha) Jackson Road Park, dedicated in 1975, features two half-court basketball courts: one with a standard 10-foot (3.0 m) rim and one with a 9-foot (2.7 m) rim for younger players. The playground was renovated in 2005. About half of the park is undeveloped wetlands.
- The 1-mile (1.6 km) Kate Kennard Trail, named for the late daughter of a former mayor, was dedicated in 1988. It begins on Long Hill West, west of the Aspinwall Road intersection.
- Lynn McCrum Field, named for Briarcliff Manor's second village manager, was dedicated in June 1999. The field, at the corner of Chappaqua Road and Route 9A, has a multi-purpose playing field for baseball, softball, and soccer, parking for 50 cars, and a utility building with restrooms.
- Neighborhood Park, dedicated in 1954 and augmented in 1958 and 1964, is 5 acres (2.0 ha) at the corner of Whitson and Fuller Roads adjacent to Schrade Road. The Whitson Road side of the park has a youth baseball field; a basketball court and playground are accessible from the Schrade Road entrance.
- Nichols Nature Area, accessible from Nichols Place, is a steeply sloped 3.8-acre (1.5 ha) site acquired in 1973 as part of a residential subdivision.
- The Old Croton Aqueduct State Historic Park, running along the Old Croton Aqueduct, crosses the village between Broadway and the Hudson River. Its 26.2-mile (42.2 km) trail, following the aqueduct from the Croton Reservoir to New York City, is a popular bicycling and running path maintained by New York State. Access from the village is from Scarborough Road north of the Scarborough Fire Station.
- Pine Road Park, an undeveloped 66-acre (27 ha) parcel acquired in 1948 and augmented in 1963, lies between Pine Road and Long Hill Road East.

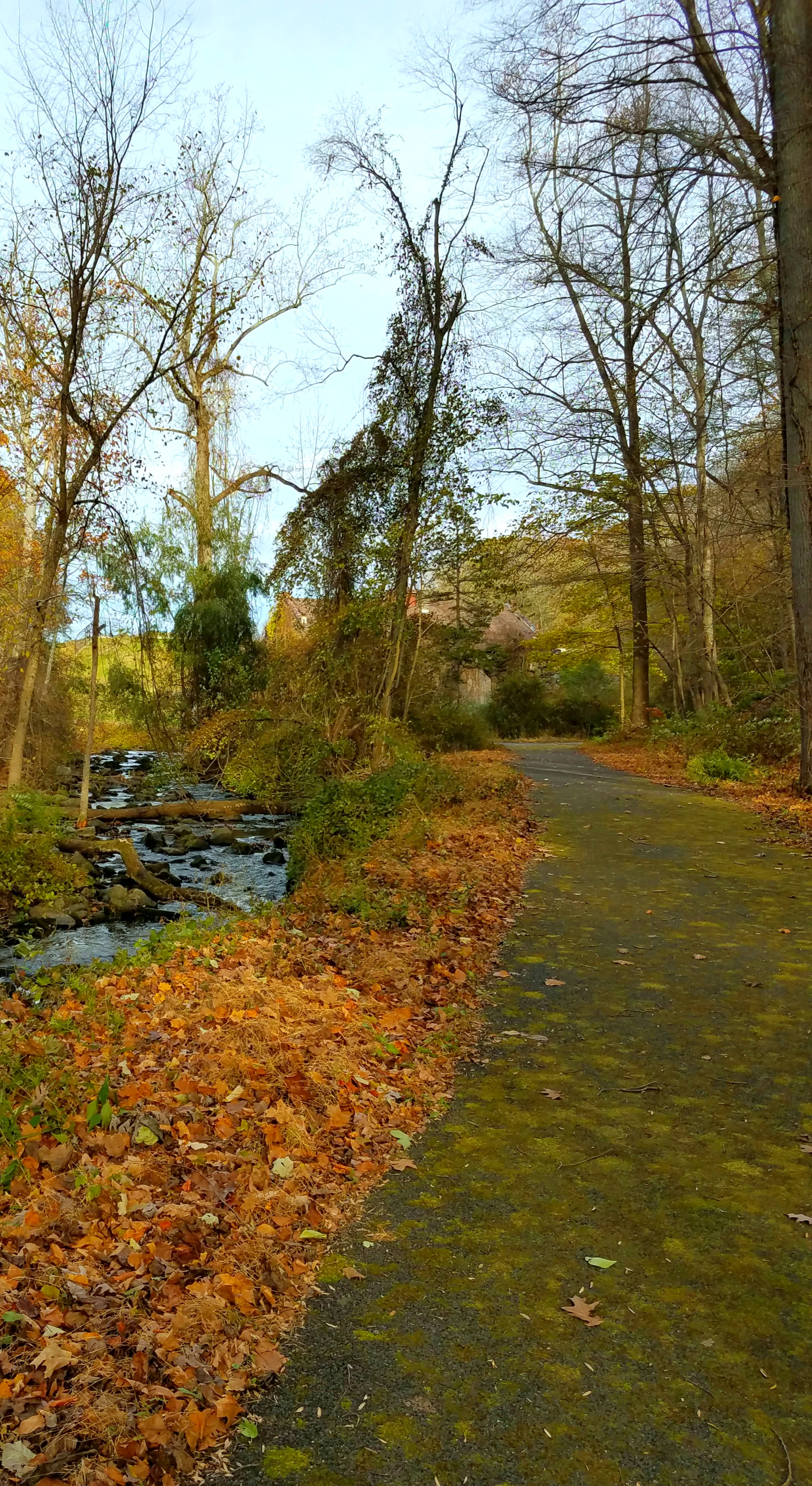
Pocantico Lake Trail, a primary hiking route in Pocantico Lake Park

- The 70.9-acre (28.7 ha) Pocantico Lake Park, Briarcliff Manor's largest park, was acquired in 1948 and augmented in 1963, 1964, and 1967. Abutting the Pocantico River, it is home to a large number and variety of regional fauna and has marked hiking trails.
- The Recreation Center, purchased by the village in 1980, is the former Chilmark Country Club clubhouse and provides seasonal indoor recreation. Community organizations using the center include the Briarcliff Manor Garden Club, the Senior Citizens Club and the Max Pavey Chess Club.
- Scarborough Park, a 6-acre (2.4 ha) park acquired in 1908 and developed in the early 1900s near the Scarborough train station, is surrounded on three sides by the Hudson River. 1-acre (0.40 ha) is above-water land, and the rest is below the Hudson.
- The 2,400-square-foot (220 m^{2}) Village Youth Center, near the central business district, has a deck, a patio, and a lighted outdoor basketball court. It also provides an indoor facility for community programs and activities.
- Walter W. Law Memorial Park (originally Liberty Park), in the center of the village on Pleasantville Road, is a 7-acre (2.8 ha) park which was donated to the village by Law in 1904. Its outdoor pool complex, added in July 1927 at a cost of $8,641 ($160,200 in 2025), has a 30-foot-diameter (9.1 m) wading pool and a 120-by-75-foot (37 m × 23 m) main pool, which was Westchester's first public swimming pool. After a complete reconstruction of the pool in 1977, a two-story bathhouse and pavilion was completed in 2001 as part of a rehabilitation project, which included paved walkways and a veterans' memorial. The park was rededicated on Veterans Day 2001. It has four lighted tennis courts: three clay and one all-weather. The pond was used for ice skating and hockey until the village bought a temporary rink for one of the tennis courts; the shallow rink freezes days earlier than the pond, and the tennis court lighting system allows easier skating at night. Adjacent to the tennis courts is a playground. Two platform tennis courts are north of the park, and the Briarcliff Manor Public Library and Community Center is on its eastern edge. In 2016, a memorial to Medal of Honor recipient John Koelsch was constructed in the park and dedicated on Veterans Day that year.
- The Westchester County Bike Trail (also known as the North County Trailway) is a 22.1-mile-long (35.6 km) rail trail criss-crossing forests, towns, and highways. One highlight is the New Croton Reservoir and its former railway bridge. Trail access from the village is behind the library, off Pleasantville Road. The trail extends north (primarily along Route 100) to Baldwin Place in Somers, and south along Route 9A to Eastview in Mount Pleasant.

Although there are no public golf courses in Briarcliff Manor, the village has two large country clubs: Sleepy Hollow Country Club in Scarborough and Trump National Golf Club, owned by Donald Trump. The Trump property has been home to several golf clubs since the early 20th century, including Briarcliff Country Club, Briar Hills Country Club, and Briar Hall Golf and Country Club. Trump purchased the site in 1996 and opened the club in 2002. The main building of Sleepy Hollow Country Club was formerly Woodlea, the 140-room Renaissance Revival mansion of Margaret Louisa Vanderbilt Shepard and her husband Elliott Fitch Shepard. The building, which has about 70,000 square feet (6,500 m^{2}), is one of the largest houses in the United States.

== Government ==
Briarcliff Manor
Crime rates (2010–2017)
Crime type	2011	2012	2013	2014	2015	2016	2017	2018
Homicide:	0	0	0	0	0	0	0	0
Robbery:	2	0	0	0	0	0	1	0
Aggravated assault:	0	0	1	2	0	0	1	0
Total violent crime:	2	0	1	2	0	0	2	0
Burglary:	8	4	1	4	7	5	1	3
Larceny-theft:	22	10	10	13	25	18	19	10
Motor vehicle theft:	0	0	0	0	0	0	0	3
Total property crime:	30	14	11	17	32	23	20	13
Arson:	0	0	0	0	2	0	0	1
Sources: Newsday; FBI 2012, 2013, 2014, 2015, 2016, 2017, 2018 data

The village government is led by a mayor and four trustees, all unpaid officials elected at-large for two-year terms. The current mayor is Steven A. Vescio, elected in 2019. A full-time, appointed village manager handles day-to-day community affairs; the first was Max Vogel in 1967. The current Village Manager is Josh Ringel. Briarcliff Manor's government operates from the village hall, which houses the Justice Court and the administrative offices of the Village (except for DPW and Recreation). As of February 2014, there are 5,531 registered voters in Briarcliff Manor. As of 2017 the village's government employed 69 people full-time, including their building department, planning board, department of public works, the recreation department, the police department, the architectural review advisory committee, and the conservation advisory council. The village government administered a 2017–18 operating budget of approximately $28 million which predominantly went towards public works, police protection, debt service, and recreational facilities and services.

Briarcliff Manor maintains a voting custom that dates to at least around 1905. In addition to its customary general election, held at the same day in every municipality in New York, the village has a nonpartisan caucus, a town meeting-style forum to determine officeholders. The system of the People's Caucus is largely unique to the village, and has been described as an extension of the New England town hall concept. The People's Caucus, officially formed in 1946, chooses candidates by majority vote two months before the village election, where the candidates usually run unopposed, turning the election into a formality. The caucus is open to citizens of 18 years or over who have lived in the village for at least a month; voter registration is not required. Voters and candidates do not declare party affiliations, instead candidates present their platforms in early January of each year, and weeks later the caucus meets again to vote.

In the Westchester County Board of Legislators, the western portion of Briarcliff Manor (in Ossining) is represented by Democrat and Majority Leader Catherine Borgia in District 9, while the eastern part (in Mount Pleasant) is represented by Conservative Margaret A. Cunzio in District 3. In the New York State Legislature, the western portion of the village is represented by Democrat Sandy Galef for the New York State Assembly's 95th District, while the eastern portion is represented by Democrat Thomas Abinanti for the Assembly's 92nd District. Democrat David Carlucci represents the Ossining portion of the village for the New York Senate's 38th District, and Republican Terrence Murphy represents the Mount Pleasant end of the village in the Senate's 40th District. In Congress, the village is represented by Republican Mike Lawler in the House of Representatives from New York's 17th District and Democrats Kirsten Gillibrand and Chuck Schumer in the Senate.

=== Crime ===
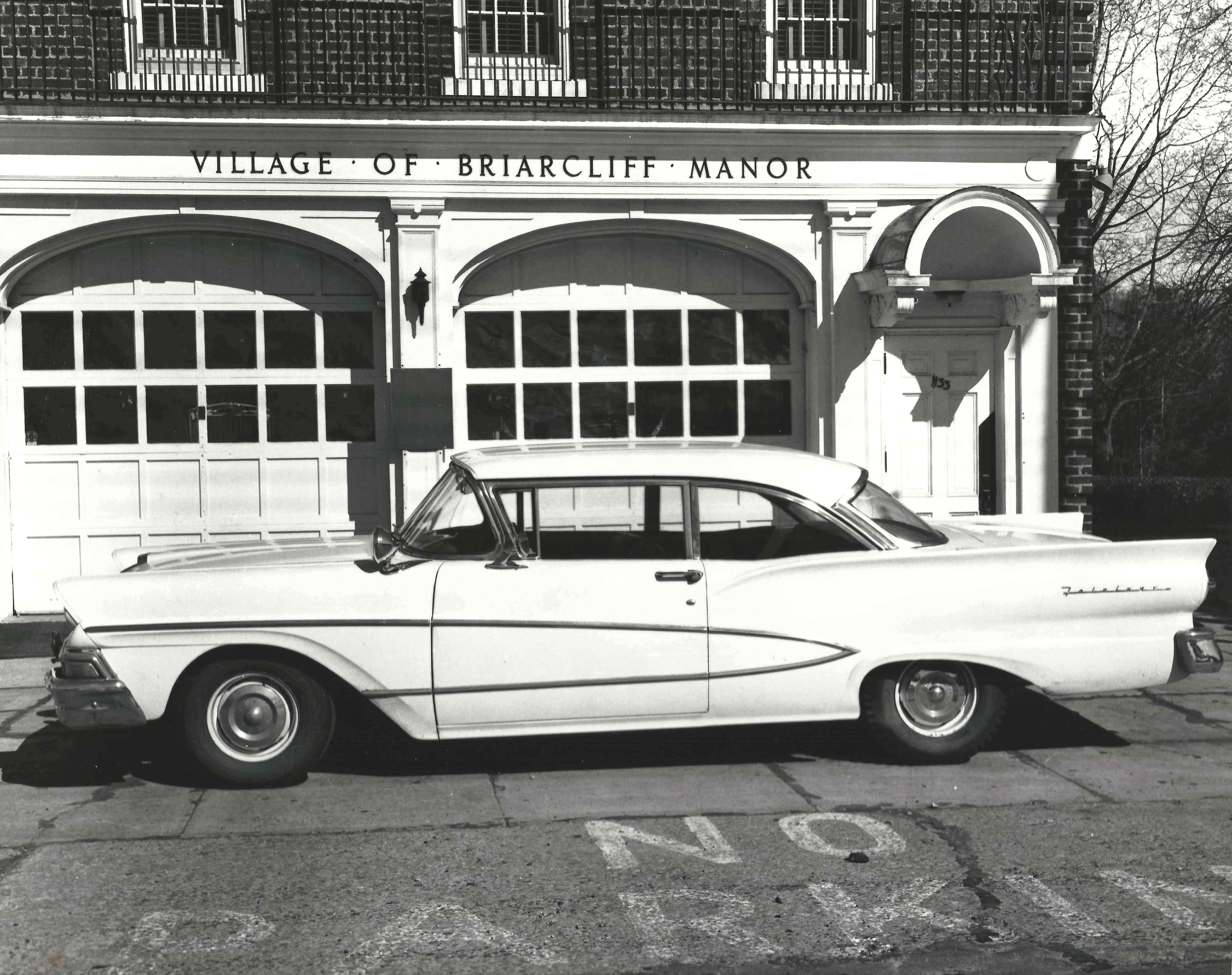
A Briarcliff Manor Ford Fairlane police cruiser in 1962

The Briarcliff Manor police force was founded by Edward Cashman, a one-person force who covered his beat on foot and by bicycle. The crime rate was low during both world wars, and village police work primarily involved rounding up animals (as the constabulary had done since before the Revolution). Most other cases were traffic violations, due to the village's size and parkway access. During the 1980s (as in the 1940s), the police blotter primarily consisted of accidents and traffic violations on the four major roads traversing the village; a 1939 village history asserted that "Briarcliff has never had a serious crime". Burglaries have been primarily residential, and murder is rare. In 1989, when the police force considered replacing its .38 six-shot revolvers with semiautomatic 9mm pistols, opinion was divided; village officials could not remember when an officer last fired a gun on duty.

In its study of 2012 FBI Uniform Crime Reports, national realtor Movoto LLC assessed Briarcliff Manor as the second-safest municipality in New York, with the second-lowest crime rate in the state. According to the FBI reports, the village had no reported violent crimes in 2012 and a resident had a 1-in-569 chance of being a crime victim. In 2014, security system company Safe Choice Security used the same data and assessed Briarcliff Manor as the safest municipality in New York. A SafeWise report in 2016 using 2014 FBI data assessed the village as the third safest in New York.

== Education ==
=== Early childhood education ===
Garden House School is an elementary school in London; it also runs preschools in New York City and in Briarcliff Manor, at the Briarcliff Congregational Church's parish house. Briarcliff Nursery School is a preschool on Morningside Drive, just outside village borders in Ossining. It was established in 1947 at Briarcliff Manor's old recreation building; it moved to Walter Law's Manor House and then to the William Kingsland mansion, and moved to its current location in 1955.

=== Primary and secondary schools ===
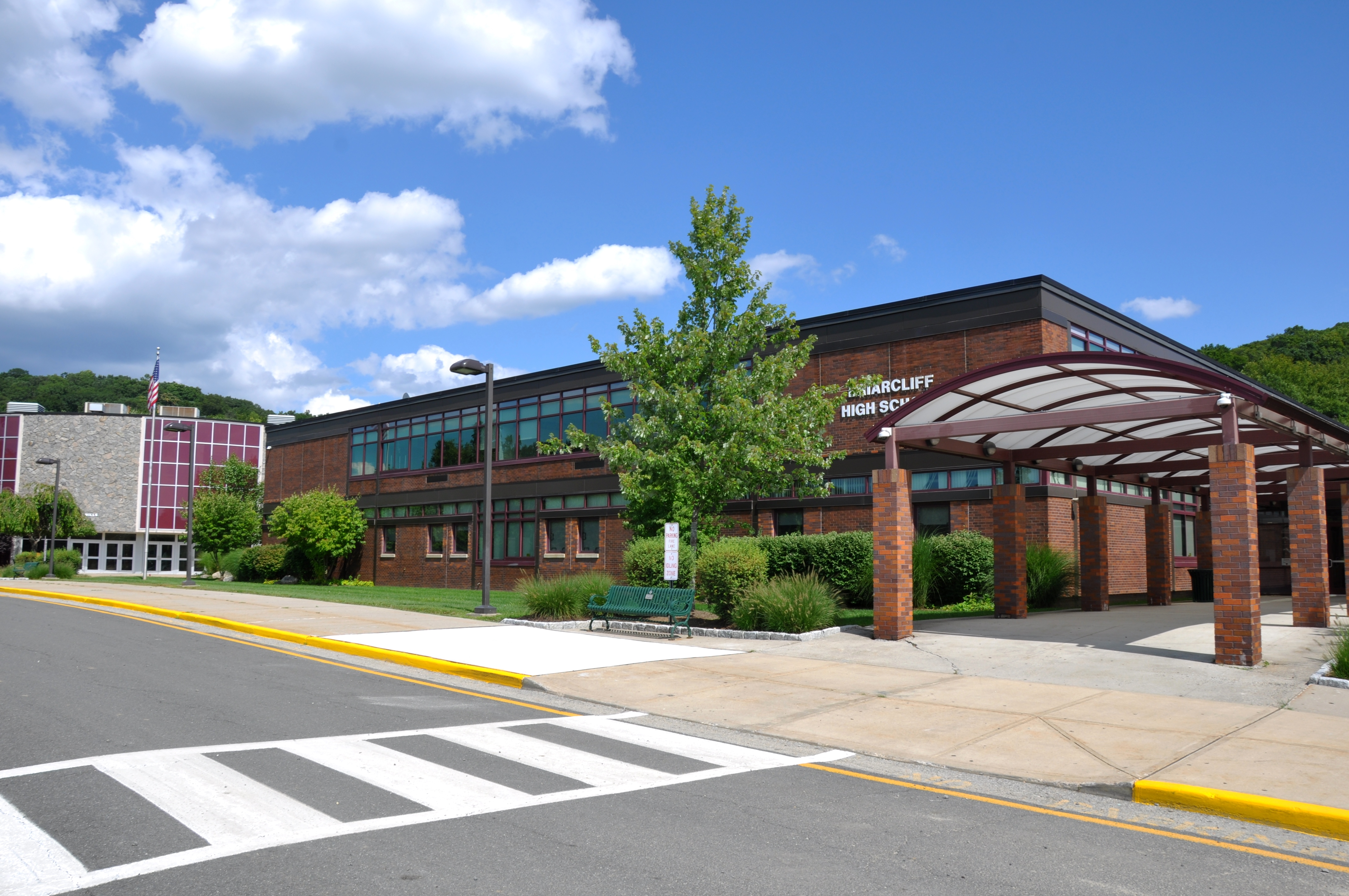
Briarcliff High School

The village is home to the Briarcliff Manor Union Free School District, which covers most of the village of Briarcliff Manor and an unincorporated portion of the town of Mount Pleasant. Parts of Briarcliff Manor not covered by the school district include Scarborough and Chilmark and total 28% of the municipality's area; these areas are part of the Ossining Union Free School District.

The Briarcliff Manor district serves over 1,000 students and includes Todd Elementary School, Briarcliff Middle School, and Briarcliff High School. From Briarcliff Manor's settlement until 1918, students in grades 1–8 were taught within one school facility; from 1919 until the 1940s, students in grades 1–12 were as well. The district is noted for its annual high-school musicals. The elementary school (opened in 1953) is named after George A. Todd, Jr., who was the village's first teacher, first superintendent of schools, and taught for over 40 years. The middle school became a Blue Ribbon School in 2005.

Briarcliff Manor has been home to a number of schools. Long Hill School was a public school in Scarborough until 1912, with about 70 students, two classrooms, and two teachers. Dr. Holbrook's Military School was on Holbrook Road from 1866 to 1915. Miss Tewksbury's School and later Mrs. Marshall's Day & Boarding School for Little Girls was at Dysart House. Miss Knox's School ran from 1905 in Pocantico Lodge, a hotel on Pleasantville Road under Briarcliff Lodge management. When it burned down in 1912, the school moved to Tarrytown and then to Cooperstown. Since 1954, the Knox School has been located at St. James, New York. The Scarborough School was first Montessori school in the United States; it was located at the Beechwood estate from 1913 until it closed in 1978. Since then, The Clear View School has run a day treatment program for 83 students from nursery school age to 21 there. The Macfadden School ran from 1939 to 1950 at the William Kingsland mansion in the village. The village's Catholic church, St. Theresa's, operated a school for pre-kindergarten to eighth grade students from 1965 to 2013. At its closing, the school had approximately 150 students and 20 employees.

=== Higher education ===
Pace University's Dow Hall, built in 1905

The first institute for higher education in the village was the School of Practical Agriculture and Horticulture, which Walter Law helped establish on his Briarcliff Farms in 1900. The school taught students ages 16 to 35 in crop and livestock care. In 1902, the school moved to a larger location near Poughkeepsie and closed a year later due to a lack of funding. In addition, Briarcliff Manor has been the location for several colleges. Briarcliff Junior College was founded in 1903 at the Briarcliff Lodge, and moved near Briarcliff Congregational Church, on land Walter Law donated, in 1905. Among its trustees were Howard Deering Johnson, Norman Cousins, Carl Carmer, Thomas K. Finletter, William Zorach, Eduard C. Lindeman, and Lyman Bryson. Ordway Tead was chairman of the board of trustees, and his wife Clara was the college's first president. The school gradually improved its academic scope and standing, and was registered with the State Education Department and accredited by the Middle States Association of Colleges and Schools in 1944. In 1951, the Board of Regents authorized the college to grant Associate of Arts and Associate of Applied Science degrees. The following year, the Army Map Service selected the college as the only one in the country for professional training in cartography. In 1956, the junior college started issuing bachelor's degrees, and became known as Briarcliff College. In 1977 Pace University bought Briarcliff College and the Spanish Renaissance-style Briarcliff Grade School building, incorporating them into its Pleasantville campus. The Briarcliff Grade School building, which housed the village public school from 1909 to 1980, became known as the Pace University Village Center. During Pace's occupation, the building housed the Briarcliff Manor-Scarborough Historical Society and the Village Youth Center. Pace University operated the school building until its demolition in 1996, and the Briarcliff College campus until 2015. At the Briarcliff Lodge property, the Edgewood Park School operated from 1936 to 1954, and King's College subsequently operated there from 1955 to 1994, also using the lodge building and other dormitories and academic buildings.

== Media ==
A still of the Saturday Night Live pilot featuring Briarcliff Manor

Briarcliff Manor has been the subject, inspiration, or location for literature, television episodes, and films. Much of James Patterson's 2005 novel, Honeymoon, is set in the village (where Patterson is a part-year resident). Sharon Anne Salvato's Briarcliff Manor takes place on the fictional estate of Briarcliff Manor, and the novel was published by Stein and Day in the village. The pilot episode of Saturday Night Live was filmed in the central business district, where Briarcliff Manor Pharmacy, Briarcliff Wines & Liquors, and Briarcliff Hardware are the backdrop for the "Show Us Your Guns" sketch; the episode aired October 11, 1975. As well, Briarcliff College's president Josiah Bunting III was the half-brother of the show's co-creator Dick Ebersol; while President, Bunting let Ebersol film the show at the college for free. In Pan Am, Sleepy Hollow Country Club was the setting for much of the series' third episode. In February and March 2013, the final three episodes of the first season of television show The Following were filmed in and around the former town of Ossining police station in Briarcliff Manor. In early 2016, filming for the Amazon Studios series Crisis in Six Scenes filmed at Ashridge, on Scarborough Road. The series is directed by and stars Woody Allen. Sleepy Hollow Country Club is also a popular filming location for television shows and films.

Films shot in the village include The Seven Sisters, House of Dark Shadows, Savages, Bed of Roses, Super Troopers, Analyze That, First Born, American Gangster, and The Bourne Legacy. The Seven Sisters, a 1915 production, was filmed at the Briarcliff Lodge. The 1970 House of Dark Shadows and the 1972 Merchant Ivory film Savages were filmed at the Beechwood mansion in Scarborough. Bed of Roses was released in 1996, and was filmed at an 1860s house on Scarborough Road which was the home of Eileen O'Connor Weber. (Note: Weber (1918–2013) was an active and longtime village resident and a founding member and former president of the village historical society.) Super Troopers, released in 2001, was partially filmed on the Taconic State Parkway from Poughkeepsie to Briarcliff Manor. Analyze That, a film from 2002, was filmed in the village and nearby locations, including the Sing Sing Correctional Facility in the village of Ossining. The 2007 film First Born was filmed at a house in Briarcliff Manor. American Gangster, also released in 2007, includes scenes filmed at two village houses. Some parts of the 2012 film The Bourne Legacy were filmed at the village's entranceway to the Taconic State Parkway and at other roads in the village. The 2013 dark comedy Inside Llewyn Davis was partially filmed at Pace University's Briarcliff campus, adapting its dining hall into a 1960s Fred Harvey restaurant in an Illinois Tollway oasis.

Print media has been produced in the village since the early 20th century, when Briarcliff Farms operated a printing press and office, producing Briarcliff Farms, the Briarcliff Bulletin in 1900, the monthly Briarcliff Outlook in 1903 followed by The Briarcliff Once-a-Week in 1908 (all edited by Arthur W. Emerson). The Briarcliff Community Club, a social organization created by the village in 1910 and which existed until 1927, later printed Community Notes. Later papers include The Briarcliff Forum (founded in 1926) and the 1930s Briarcliff Weekly. Briarcliff Manor is the city of license of WXPK, and other media outlets include the Briarcliff Daily Voice, News 12, Patch Media, and the River Journal. Official newspapers for the village include The Journal News and The Gazette.

== Infrastructure ==
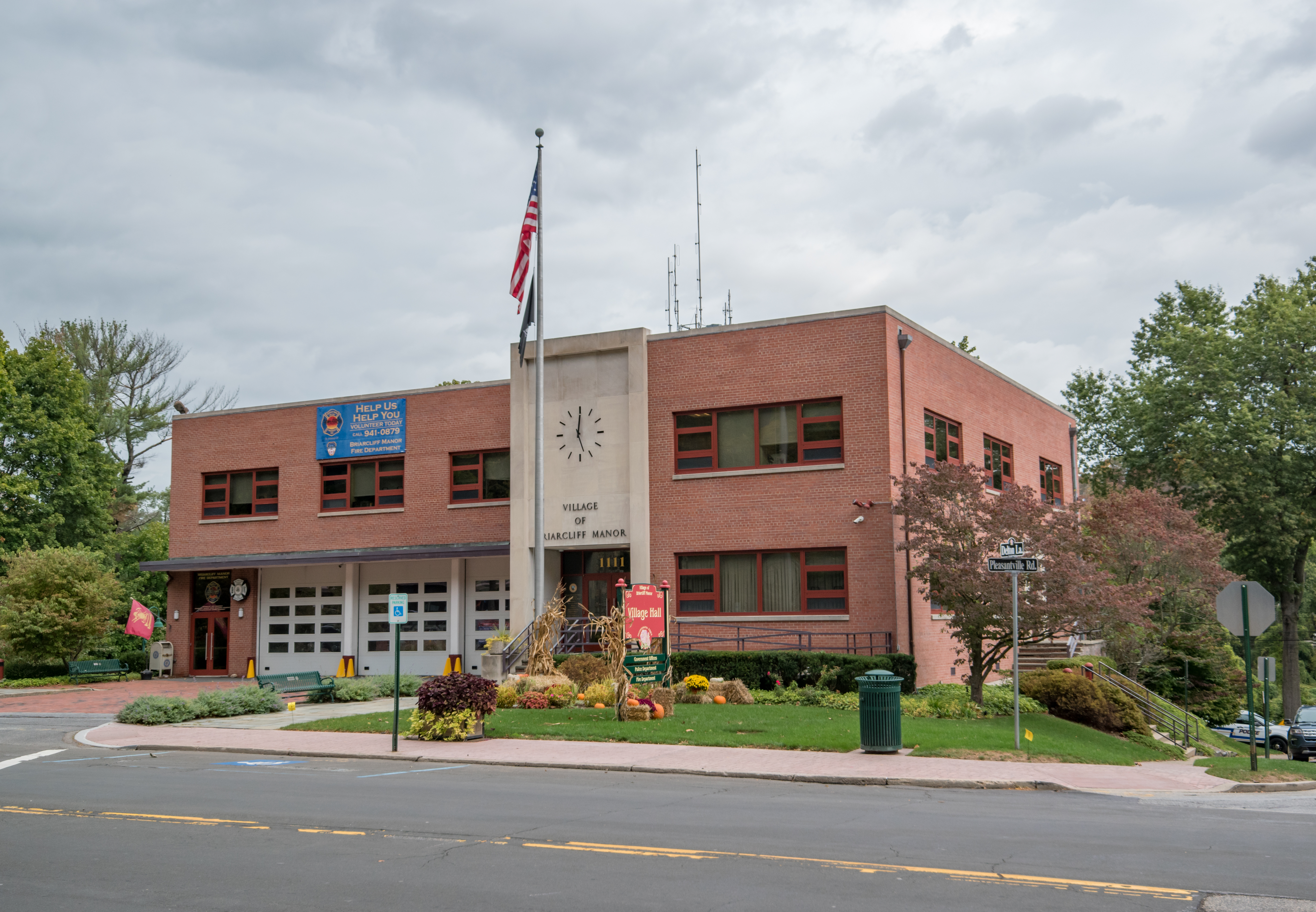
Briarcliff Manor Village Hall

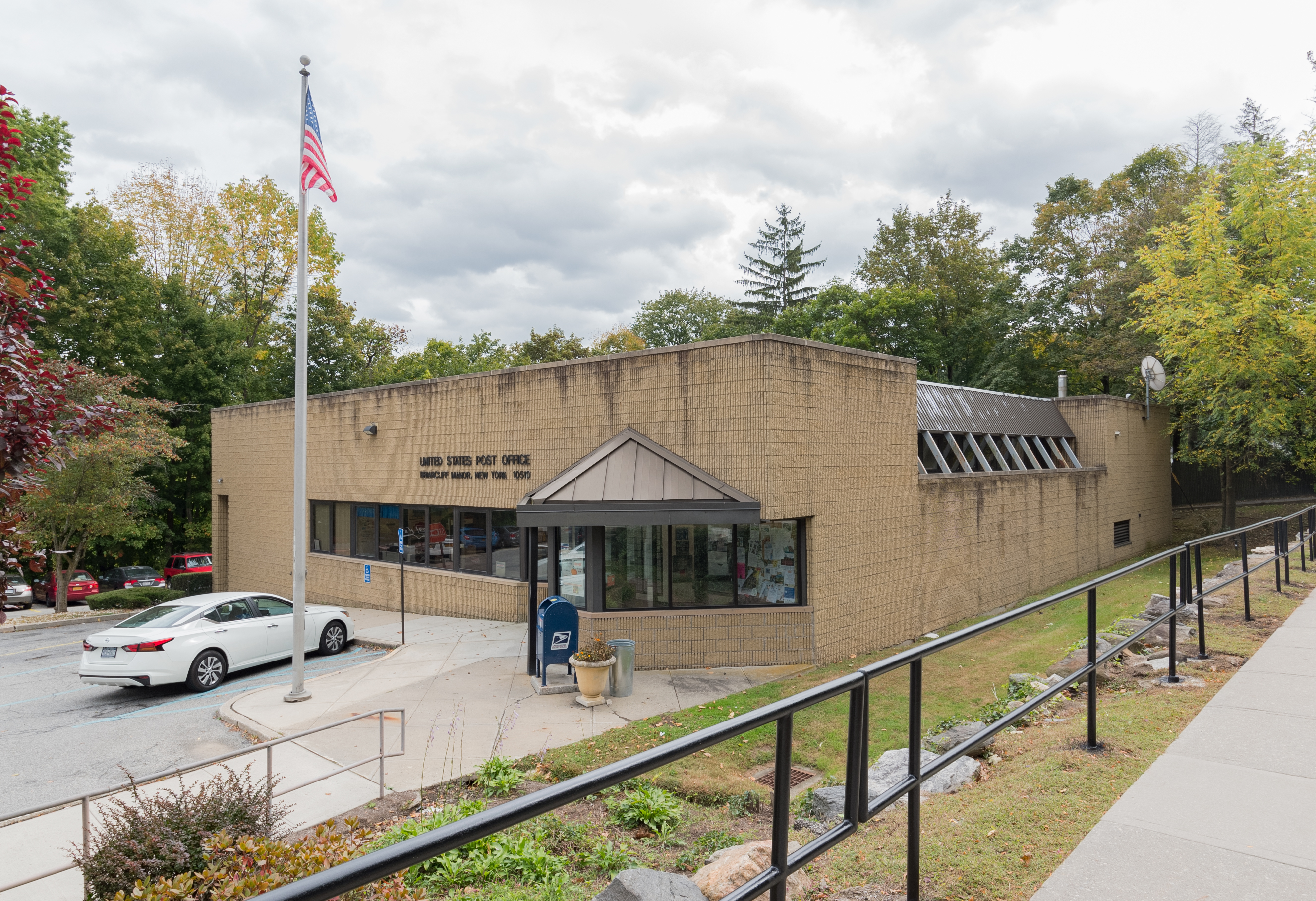
Village post office

The Briarcliff Manor Police Department and the volunteer Briarcliff Manor Fire Department are stationed at the Briarcliff Manor Village Hall. The Police Department has 19 personnel—a chief, lieutenant, five sergeants, and twelve patrol officers—and one part-time civilian. The Briarcliff Manor Fire Department Ambulance Corps provides emergency medical transport with two ambulances. The village is also serviced by two private EMS providers.

Briarcliff Manor has a post office in its central business district on Pleasantville Road and in Scarborough by the train station. The first post office opened in 1881 in the first train station; it was named for Whitson's Corners. The post office was renamed the Briarcliff Manor Post Office in 1897. When the station building was moved to Millwood, New York, the post office was temporarily moved to a building near the new station. The following post office, a concrete building, was to its east on Pleasantville Road. It was demolished to make way for the Briarcliff-Peekskill Parkway. The post office then moved to an inn, and subsequently to John Whitson's house, the Crossways. In 1933 a replacement building was constructed in the central business district, followed in 1953 by a new brick building next to the present-day village hall. The current post office was constructed at a cost of $500,000 ($2,468,100 in 2025) and was completed in November 1978. The building is located just south of its prior location. Post office house-to-house delivery began on November 17, 1952.

Consolidated Edison provides electric power and natural gas to the village, and the Briarcliff Manor Department of Public Works supplies water from the Catskill Aqueduct to the village's water system. The department also maintains the sewer system, village vehicles, roads, and grounds, operates a recycling center, and removes snow. In 2016 the village recycled 53 percent of its waste, about the same as the county average of 54 percent. The department, primarily rooted in the 1941 sale of Walter Law's Briarcliff Table Water Company, began with a state-mandated street commissioner. The commissioner in 1914 was Arthur Brown; asked by village officials if he needed an automobile, Brown replied that he preferred a horse but would use an automobile if the village purchased it (it did not). The department has about thirty vehicles and employs twenty-nine people.

The department operates the Long Hill Road water treatment plant and village pump stations. The Long Hill Road pump house is the primary water supply for the village with supply capacity exceeding 3.5 million gallons per day (MGD). Briarcliff Manor's average daily water supply demand is 1.45 MGD with a peak demand of 3.5 MGD. Briarcliff Manor has four water storage tanks (at Rosecliff, Farm Road, the former King's College, and the Edith Macy Conference Center) and two pump stations (the Long Hill Road pump house and the Dalmeny Road pump station).

=== Transportation ===
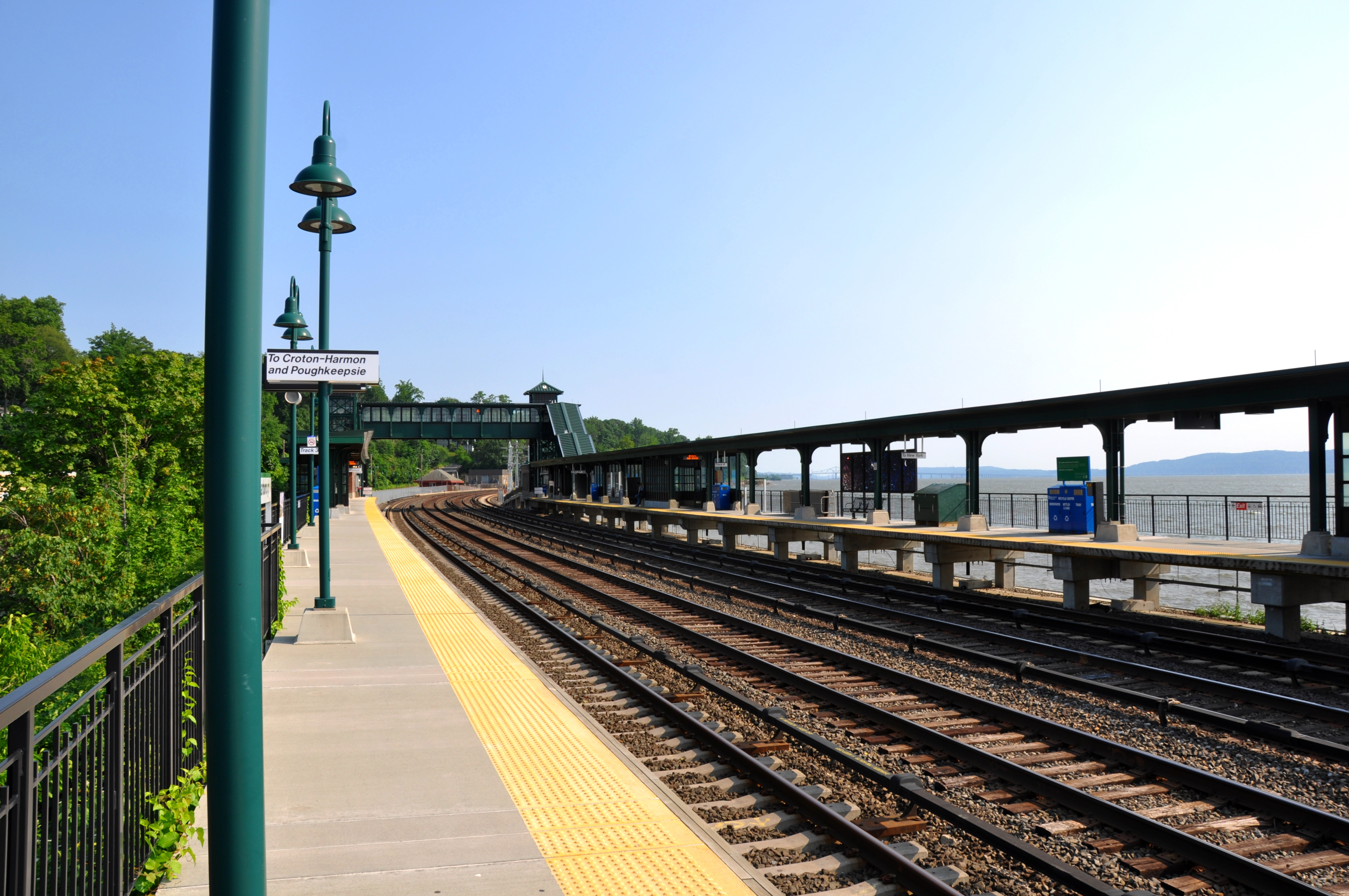
The Scarborough Metro-North station platform, tracks, and overpass

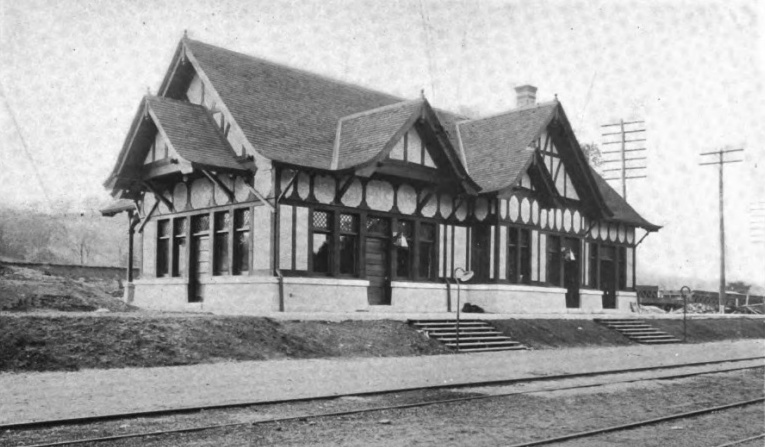
Law's Briarcliff Manor station (now part of the village library) in 1906

The village's transportation system includes highways, streets, and a rail line; its low population density favors automobiles. Briarcliff Manor is accessible by the controlled-access Taconic State Parkway; it can also be reached by U.S. Route 9, New York State Route 9A and New York State Route 100, which traverse the village north to south. East-west travel is more difficult; Long Hill, Pine, Elm, and Scarborough roads are narrow, winding, and hilly. Routes 9 and 9A are the most heavily traversed roadways in the village.

According to the National Bridge Inventory, Briarcliff Manor has 15 bridges, with estimated daily traffic at 204,000 vehicles. Briarcliff Manor has 64 roads, with a total length of 46.1 miles (74.2 km). Twelve are named after trees, eleven after local residents and eight after veterans, and most have the road type of "lane" or "avenue", while the only "street" in the village is Stafford Street. The village's oldest existing road is Washburn Road, on which is the oldest standing house in the village, Century Homestead. The longest road in the village, at 3 miles (5 km), is Pleasantville Road; the shortest is Pine Court, 175 feet (53 m). Around the time when the Briarcliff Lodge was active, Briarcliff Manor roadways were constructed of macadam and lined with concrete drains and stone fences. Early in Briarcliff Manor's history, the first person to own an automobile was Henry Law (son of Walter Law), who owned a buckboard with an engine.

The Hudson Line's Scarborough station offers direct service to New York's Grand Central Terminal, and is the primary public transport to the city. About 750 commuters board southbound trains during the morning rush hour, most driving to the station. Westchester County's Bee-Line Bus System provides service to areas near the village center on routes 14, 15, and 19, and services the Scarborough neighborhood with routes 11 and 13.

Rail transportation in the village began on December 13, 1880, with the small Whitson's Station on the New York City & Northern Railroad (later the New York and Putnam Railroad). Before this time, residents would utilize the Ossining station, built in 1848. Walter Law replaced the 1880 station building in 1906 with a new structure in the style of his Briarcliff Lodge, with Mission style furniture and rugs. The old station was moved to Millwood, New York, around that time to become its station; it fell out of use and was demolished May 9, 2012, although plans exist for the construction of a replica. Law's Briarcliff station became the public library in 1959.

== Notable people ==
=== Historic ===
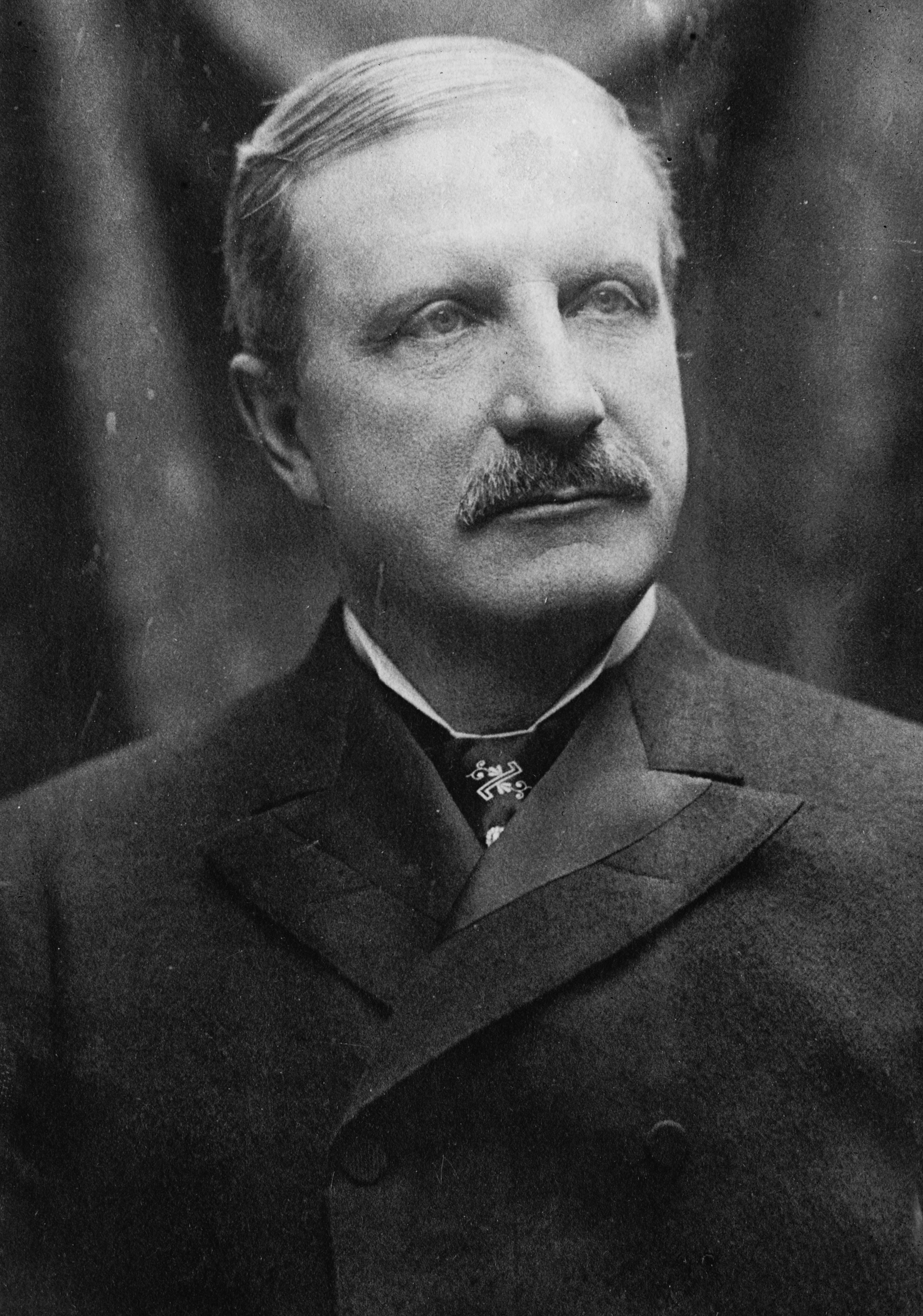
William Rockefeller

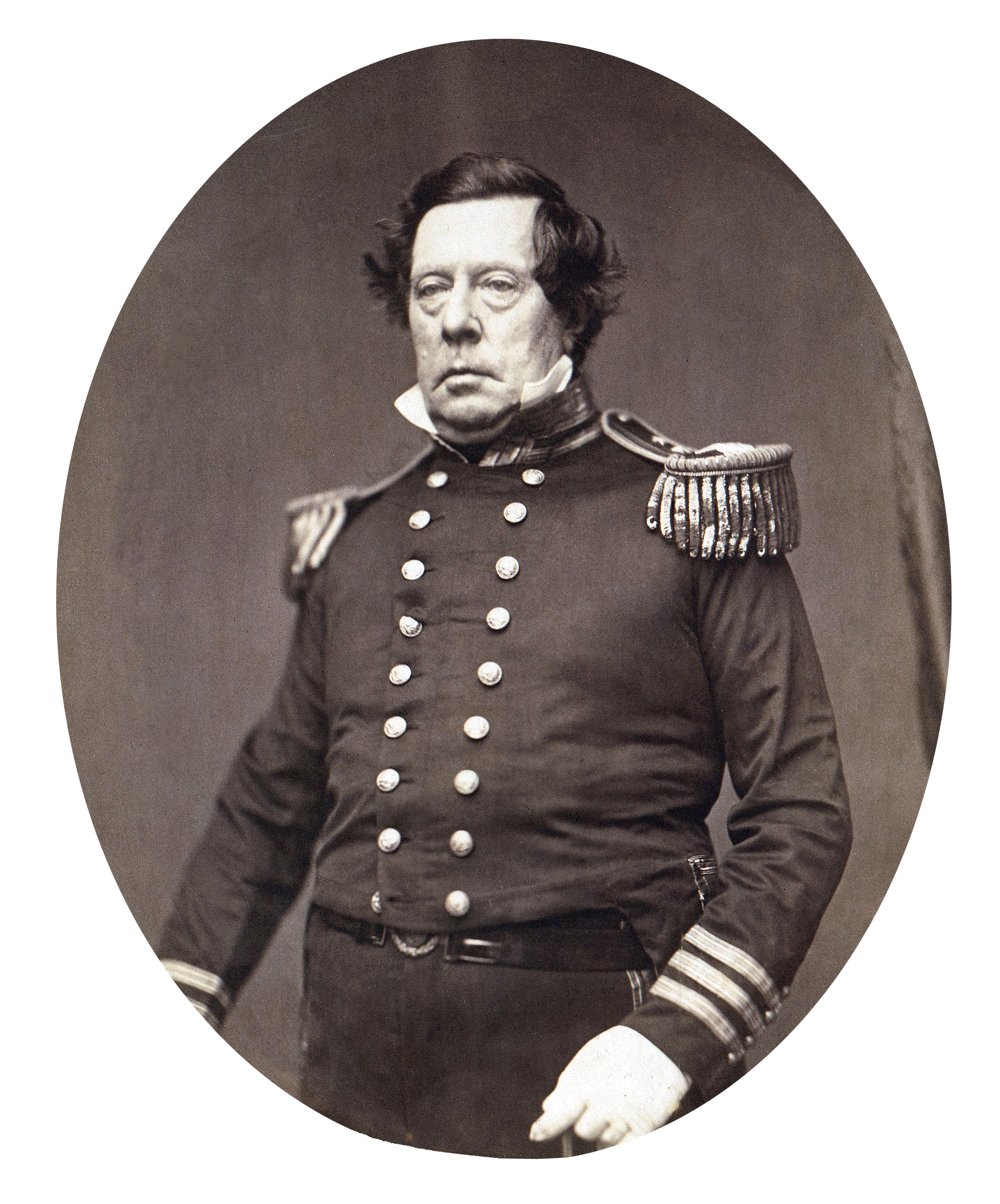
Commodore Matthew C. Perry

Briarcliff Manor was historically known for its wealthy estate-owning families, including the Rockefellers, Astors, and Macys.

- Many of the extended Rockefeller family lived in and around the neighboring area of Pocantico Hills, and William Rockefeller (brother of John D. Rockefeller) lived for some time at Edgehill, his house in Scarborough.
- U.S. Naval Commodore Matthew C. Perry, who opened Japan to the West, resided for years in Scarborough and was one of the founders of Saint Mary's Episcopal Church, and donated a bell he captured in Tabasco, Mexico to the church in 1847.
- Captain Alexander Slidell Mackenzie also lived in Scarborough.
- Businessman William Henry Aspinwall lived in Scarborough, and was sent to England during the American Civil War to prevent the construction of Confederate ironclad warships. He was involved in the Panama Canal; Panama's second-largest city (now known as Colón) was named Aspinwall after him by emigrants from the U.S., and Aspinwall Road in Scarborough was later named after him.
- John Lorimer Worden, a U.S. Navy rear admiral who commanded the USS Monitor against the CSS Virginia during the Battle of Hampton Roads, was born at Rosemont in Scarborough.
- Carrie Chapman Catt, a pioneer in the campaign for women's suffrage (president of the National American Woman Suffrage Association and founder of the League of Women Voters and the International Alliance of Women), lived at Juniper Ledge during the 1920s.
- Coker Fifield Clarkson, secretary and general manager of the Society of Automotive Engineers, lived in Scarborough
- Carle Cotter Conway, a resident of Linden Circle, was president of the Continental Can Company for 33 years.
- Banker and businessman James Speyer lived at Waldheim, an estate in Scarborough, with his family.
- William J. Burns was the penultimate director of the Bureau of Investigation; his successor, J. Edgar Hoover, transformed the agency into the Federal Bureau of Investigation. Burns established a private-investigation service, the William J. Burns International Detective Agency, and his family moved to Shadowbrook, a house on Scarborough Road, in 1917.
- Frank DuMond lived in the village and was the art director of Briarcliff College.
- Christian Archibald Herter, a physician and pathologist, lived with his wife at the Edgehill estate; he worked at a separate laboratory building on the property.
- William Woodward Baldwin, a lawyer and the ninth Third Assistant Secretary of State, rented The Elms (a house in the village) from 1897 to 1926. Further on, Baldwin bought property in the village and built a bungalow, and later bought a concrete house on Pleasantville Road near the Briarcliff train station. He was a trustee of the Briarcliff Congregational Church and district board of education, counsel to the village government, and member of the Mount Pleasant Field Club (present-day Trump National Golf Club Westchester).

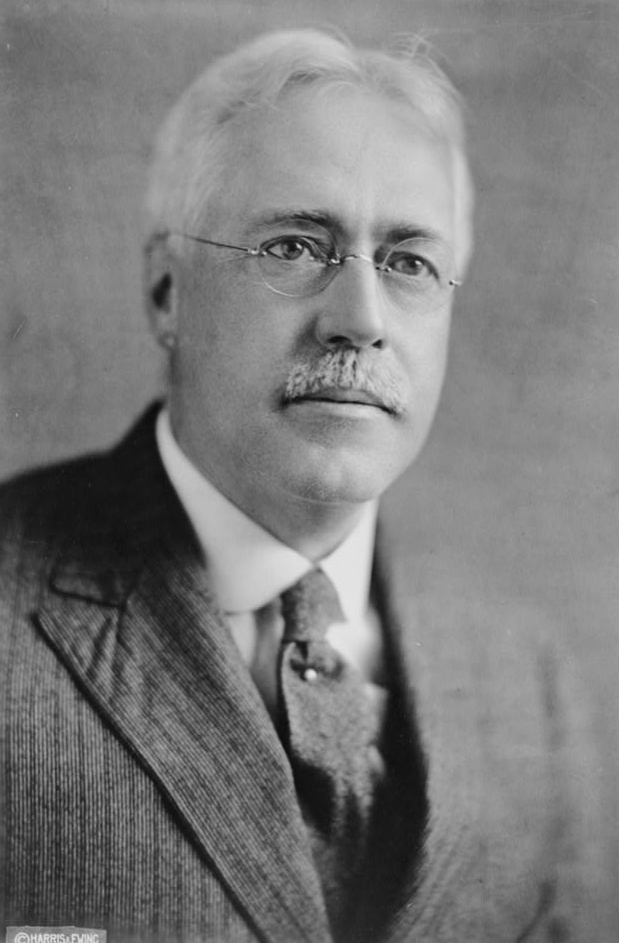
Frank A. Vanderlip

- Frank A. Vanderlip was president of the National City Bank of New York, Assistant Secretary of the Treasury, and a founder of the Federal Reserve System. He lived at the Beechwood estate and created the first Montessori school in the United States, the Scarborough School, nearby. Vanderlip also helped found and was the first president of Scarborough's Sleepy Hollow Country Club.
- Ella Holmes White and her partner Marie Grice Young lived in the Briarcliff Lodge, where an extension was built for them to reside. The two held a long-term lease there before they boarded the RMS Titanic and survived its sinking; they continued to live at the lodge until later in their lives.
- Marian Cruger Coffin, a landscape architect, was born and grew up in Scarborough.
- Harry L. Twaddle, a United States Army major general who commanded the 95th Infantry Division in World War II, was raised in Briarcliff Manor.
- Emily Taft Douglas, a U.S. Representative and wife of Senator Paul Douglas, lived in Briarcliff Manor from 1986 to her death in 1994.
- Composer and conductor Aaron Copland, famous for Rodeo and Fanfare for the Common Man, began spending weekdays at Mary Churchill's house in Briarcliff Manor in early 1929, and had a post office box in Briarcliff Manor. He spent almost a month living there before moving to nearby Bedford; his ultimate residence is in nearby Cortlandt Manor.
- Brooke Astor, a philanthropist, socialite, and member of the Astor family, lived in Briarcliff Manor for much of her life.
- Children's author C. B. Colby was on the village board, was the village's Fire Commissioner, and researched for the village historical society's 1977 history book. He lived on Pine Road until his death in 1977.
- Anna Roosevelt Halsted lived with Curtis Bean Dall on Sleepy Hollow Road; their children, Eleanor and Curtis, attended the Scarborough School.
- Blanchette Ferry Rockefeller, twice-president of the Museum of Modern Art, lived in the village until her death.
- Eugene T. Booth, a nuclear physicist and Manhattan Project developer, lived in the village.
- John Cheever lived in Scarborough, and spent most of his writing career in Westchester towns such as Briarcliff Manor and Ossining. He served in the Briarcliff Manor Fire Department.
- Coby Whitmore, a painter and magazine illustrator, lived in the village from 1945 to 1965.
- Pulitzer Prize-winning writer and journalist John Hersey attended public school and lived in Briarcliff Manor; he was the village's first Eagle Scout and a lifeguard at the village pool, and his mother Grace Baird Hersey was a village librarian.
- Folk singer and songwriter Tom Glazer lived on Long Hill Road for almost 30 years.
- Mathematician Bryant Tuckerman, who helped develop the Data Encryption Standard, was a long-time village resident.
- Sculptor Robert Weinman lived in Briarcliff Manor, where his children attended school.
- Ely Jacques Kahn, Jr., a writer for The New Yorker, lived in Scarborough for more than 20 years, and was a member of the village fire department. His father (Ely Jacques Kahn, a New York skyscraper architect) designed two houses in Briarcliff Manor, including one for sports commentator Red Barber.
- Burton Benjamin, a vice president and director of CBS News, lived in the village for about 35 years and was a trustee of the Scarborough School.
- Harcourt president William Jovanovich lived in Briarcliff Manor for 27 years.
- Leonard Jacobson, a museum architect and colleague of I. M. Pei, lived in the village.
- Jerrier A. Haddad, a computer engineer, lived in Briarcliff with his wife and five children. His wife, Carole Haddad, was president of the Briarcliff Manor-Scarborough Historical Society.
- John Kelvin Koelsch, a U.S. Navy officer during the Korean War and the first helicopter pilot to receive the Medal of Honor, lived in Scarborough and attended the Scarborough School.
- Novelist and short-story writer Richard Yates lived at the corner of Revolutionary Road and Route 9 in Scarborough as a boy, and named his novel Revolutionary Road; it was made into a 2008 film.
- Alice Low, who along with her family lived in Briarcliff Manor since the 1950s, was an author of children's books, poems, and screenplays.
- Author Sol Stein, founder and former president of the Briarcliff Manor-based Stein and Day, was a village resident.
- Rolf Landauer, a German-American physicist and a refugee from Nazi Germany, lived in the village.
- Composer, pianist, and local historian Carmino Ravosa lived at the Crossroads and was a trustee of the Briarcliff Manor-Scarborough Historical Society.
- John Chervokas was an advertising writer and executive and Ossining town supervisor and school board member, and a longtime resident of Briarcliff Manor.
- Physicist Praveen Chaudhari, an innovator in thin films and high-temperature superconductors, lived in Briarcliff Manor.
- Lawrence M. Waterhouse was the founder, CEO, and president of TD Waterhouse. Waterhouse was a resident and benefactor of the Briarcliff Manor-Scarborough Historical Society.
- Minimalist painter Brice Marden grew up in the village, and was a 1956 graduate of Briarcliff High School.
- Cardiac surgeon Peter Praeger, a founder, president, and chief executive of Dr. Praeger's Sensible Foods, was a village resident.
- Robert Alan Minzesheimer was a journalist and book critic for USA Today, and lived in Scarborough.

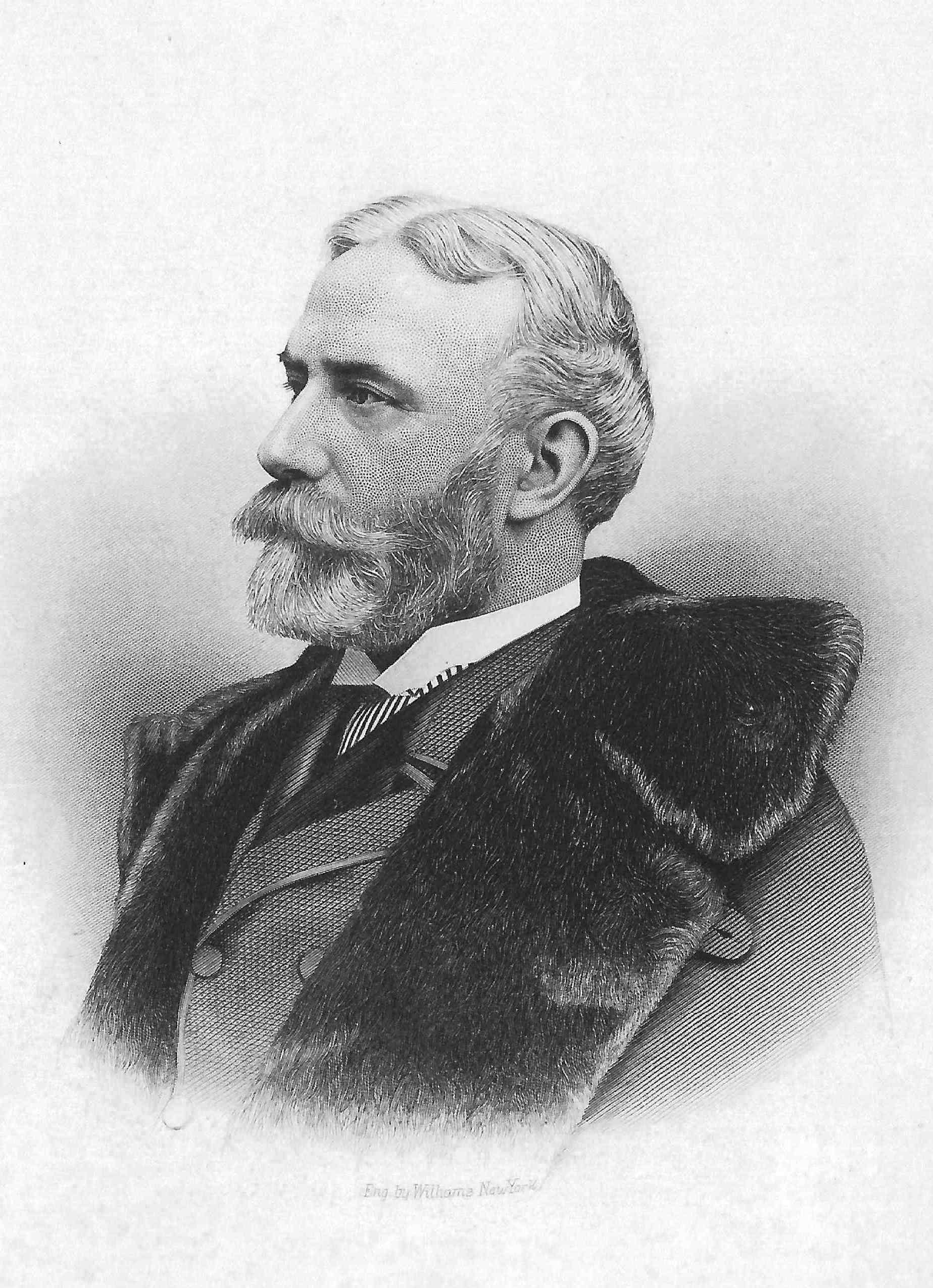
Elliott Fitch Shepard

- The Webb family lived on the Beechwood estate. Family members who lived at the estate include Henry Walter Webb, a New York Central Railroad executive who bought the property during the 1890s; Webb's cousin George Webb Morell, a Union Army brigadier general during the American Civil War, and Webb's half-brother Alexander S. Webb, a Union major general during the Civil War and a Medal of Honor recipient. Other family members were James Watson Webb (father of Henry Walter Webb), a diplomat, newspaper publisher and New York politician; General Samuel Blatchley Webb (father of James Watson Webb), an aide to George Washington; and businessman William Seward Webb (brother of Henry Walter Webb), founder and president of the Sons of the American Revolution.
- Colonel Elliott Fitch Shepard, brother-in-law of William Seward Webb and aide-de-camp to New York governor Edwin D. Morgan, lived at Woodlea in Scarborough with his wife Margaret Louisa Vanderbilt Shepard and their children.

=== Contemporary ===
Broadway lyricist Lee Adams and his wife have lived in Briarcliff Manor since the early 2000s. Biomechanics researcher and Columbia University professor Van C. Mow lives in Briarcliff Manor. His brother, architect Donald Mow, lived in Briarcliff and constructed his own house there. Warren Adelson lived with his family at Rabbit Hill, a Georgian Revival mansion in Scarborough designed around 1929 by Mott Schmidt. Robert Klein, a comedian, singer, and actor, has been living in Briarcliff Manor since the 1980s. Robert Mankoff, cartoon editor for The New Yorker magazine, lives in Briarcliff Manor. Simon Schama is a British historian and professor at Columbia University, and writer and host of the BBC series A History of Britain. Novelist James Patterson, author of the Alex Cross series, is a part-year resident of Briarcliff Manor. John Batchelor, host of The John Batchelor Show radio news program, lives in the village with his family. He is an active member of the Briarcliff Congregational Church; his wife, Bonnie Ann Rosborough, is the church's pastor. Roz Abrams is a national-news anchor known for her work with WABC and WCBS. Director, writer and producer Joseph Ruben lives in Briarcliff Manor, and musician Clifford Carter is a graduate of Briarcliff High School. William N. Valavanis and Yuji Yoshimura both lived and taught in Briarcliff Manor, where they ran the Yoshimura School of Bonsai from 1972 to 1995. Thomas Fitzgerald is a senior creative executive at Walt Disney Imagineering. Chef, restaurateur, and James Beard Award winner Michael McCarty was born and raised in Briarcliff Manor. Tom Ortenberg, the former CEO at Open Road Films and president at Lionsgate Films, was born and raised in Briarcliff Manor. Doris Downes, a botanical artist and widow of art critic Robert Hughes, owns a farmhouse in the village (where they lived for many years). Radio journalist and host of Marketplace Kai Ryssdal is from Briarcliff Manor. Curlers Bill Stopera and his son Andrew Stopera have lived in the village for over a decade, minor league baseball player Bobby Blevins grew up in the village and graduated from its schools in 2003, and Olympic swimmer Paola Duguet grew up in Briarcliff Manor. Susanne Rust, an award-winning investigative journalist, was born and raised in the village, as was Cameron Young, a top professional golfer, whose father was the head professional at Sleepy Hollow Country Club. Aerin Frankel, goaltender for the Boston Fleet and the United States women's national ice hockey team was born and raised in Briarcliff Manor.

== See also ==
- List of villages in New York
- Northern Westchester
- History of Westchester County
