= Carrie Chapman Catt House =

Historic house in New York, United States

- U.S. National Register of Historic Places
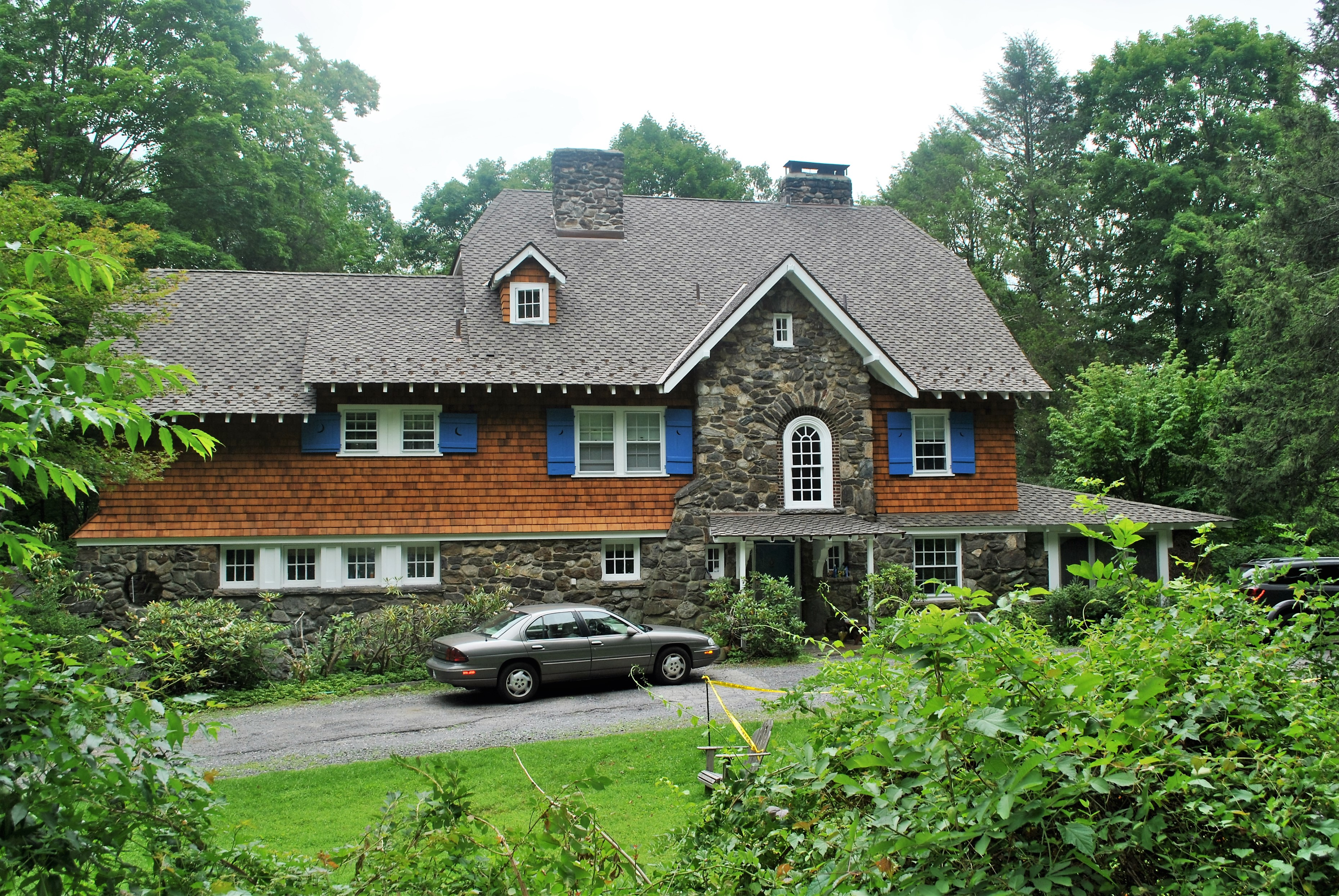
- West (front) elevation, 2014
- Interactive map highlighting the house's location
- Location: 20 Ryder Rd., Briarcliff Manor, New York
- Coordinates: 41°10′28″N 73°48′55″W
- Area: 4 acres (1.6 ha)
- Built: 1910
- Architectural style: Bungalow/Craftsman
- NRHP reference No.: 06000336
- Added to NRHP: May 4, 2006

The Carrie Chapman Catt House, also known as Juniper Ledge, is located on Ryder Road in the town of New Castle, (Note: It uses the nearby village of Briarcliff Manor as its mailing address, since it is in that ZIP Code.) New York, United States. It is an Arts and Crafts-style building from the early 20th century. In 2006 it was listed on the National Register of Historic Places; five years later it was designated a town landmark as well.

While it is a fine example of its school of architecture, the house's primary historical value is that it was the home of suffragist Carrie Chapman Catt and her partner Mary Hay from 1919 to 1928. That period was the height of her activism; it began with the passage and ratification of the Nineteenth Amendment, which granted women the right to vote, and continued with her founding of the League of Women Voters and advocacy of women's suffrage in other countries.

She found the house an ideal place to rest her "tired nerves" since the land was too steep to farm productively. However, later on she did start limited farming, including raising cattle and chickens, on the land, and made some significant modifications to the property. She also claimed to a group of guests during the early years of Prohibition that she had bought the land to prevent anyone from using its juniper berries to make gin.

After nine years, she and Hay, who had never embraced the rural lifestyle, moved out. The land has been further subdivided but the house remains largely intact. It is still a private residence. Composer Carmino Ravosa, who learned of Catt's residence there while researching a musical, has worked to preserve it.

== Building ==
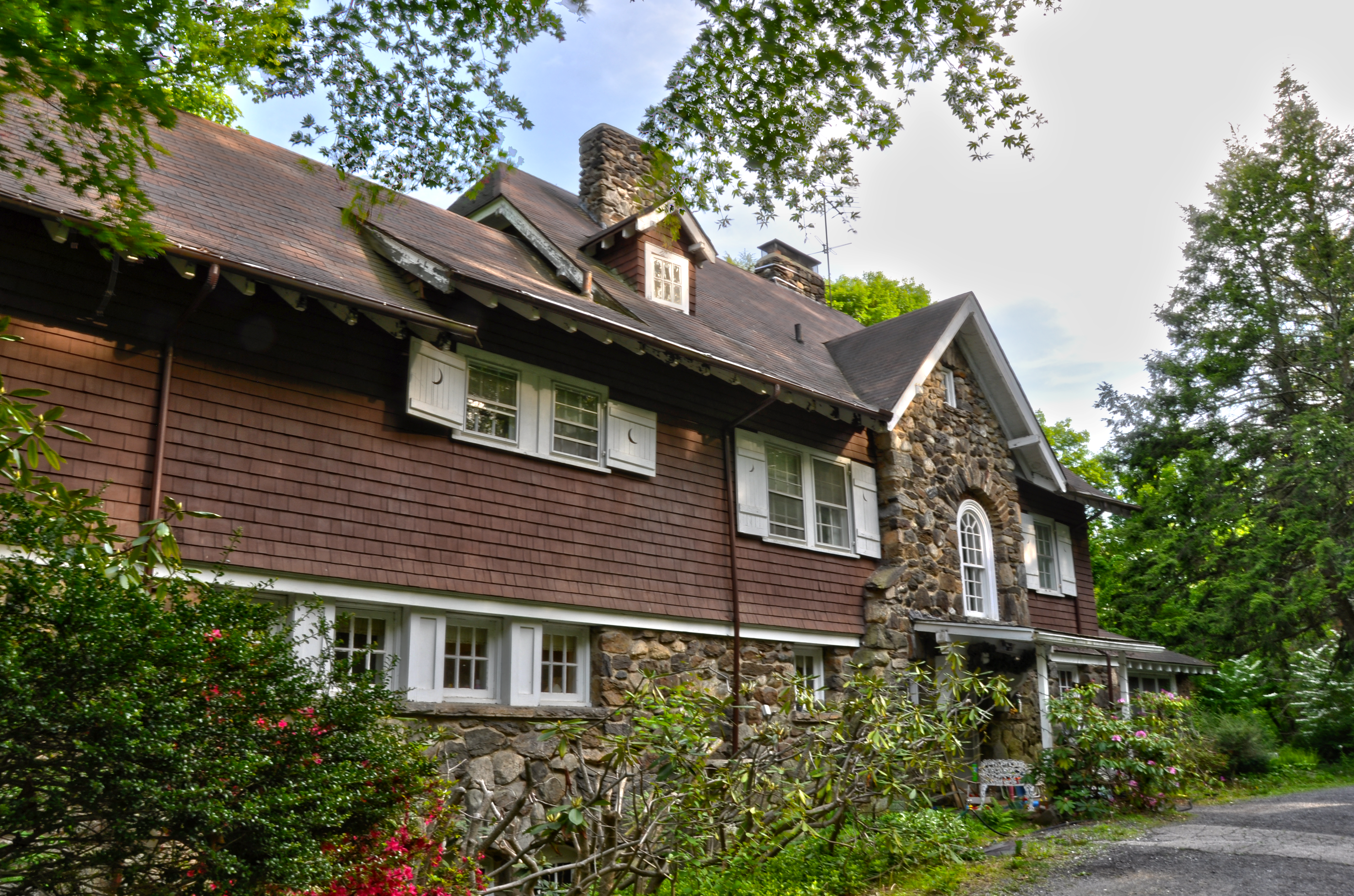
Front of the house in 2014

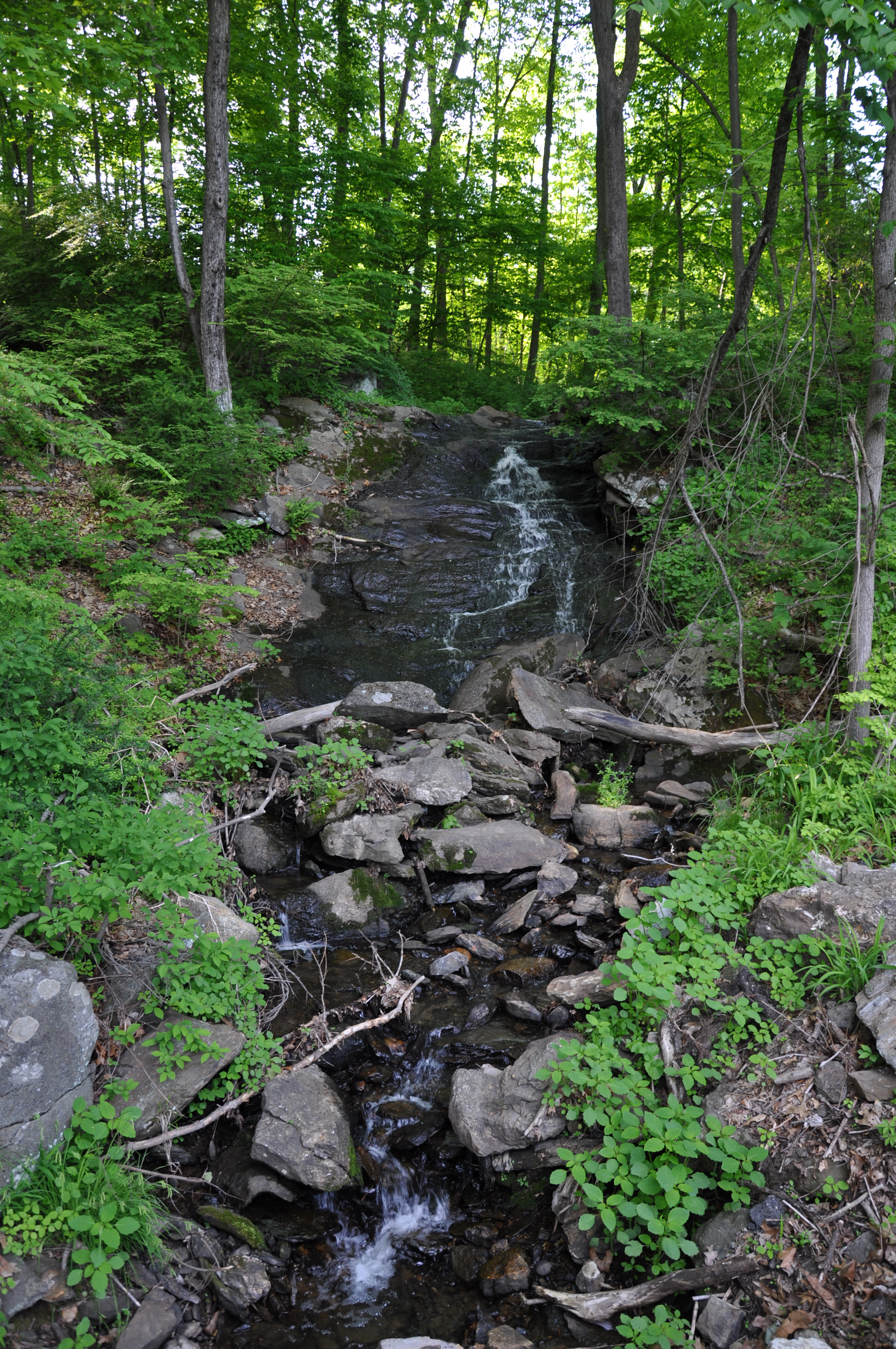
Pocantico River tributary taken across Ryder Rd.

The 4,670-square-foot (434 m^{2}) house is located on a steep 4-acre (1.6 ha) lot that slopes to the southeast in a hilly area of New Castle just north of the Ossining town line, above Saw Mill River Road (New York State Route 100) and the Taconic State Parkway a short distance to the east. The area is residential, with houses both older and newer on similarly sized lots in the neighborhood. All are heavily wooded, with many mature trees providing shade and shielding houses from public view. A small stream, an upper tributary of the Pocantico River, flows through the property.

A long driveway curves down the slope, broken up by several ledges, to Saw Mill River Road, where an entrance post has "Juniper Ledge" incised into stone. At the house, almost the highest point of the property, it connects with a shorter drive from Ryder that serves as the main driveway today, then curves around the front lawn to the house. Among the trees planted on the property are many junipers and cedars. There is a garage to the east of the house and an in-ground swimming pool in the rear yard to its north; both date to after Catt's residence and are not considered contributing resources to the property's historic character.

=== Exterior ===
The house itself is roughly T-shaped, two and a half stories tall. It is built on a foundation of randomly coursed fieldstone, covered by wood shingles on the second story. Atop is a gabled roof with clipped ends pierced by two stone chimneys. A two-story service wing is on the west end and a one-story enclosed porch on the south overlooks the pool.

On the north (front) facade the second bay from the west is a gabled stone projection. An open shed roof on the first story shelters the main entrance. Above it is an offset round-arched nine-over-nine double-hung wooden sash window with a brick surround recessed into a segmental arch in the stone.

On the rest of the facade the windows are of varying heights. They are double east of the projecting bay and single west of it. All are set with double-hung six-over-six sash in plain wooden surrounds and flanked by board-and-batten shutters.

The porch on the south facade is supported by large stone piers and enclosed with aluminum window panels. On the east gable end are windows similar to those on the front. The west wing has larger windows; some slide open.

At the attic level, there is a small four-light casement window in the projecting bay on the north. A semicircular vent window is in the east gable. The eaves are wide and overhanging, with some exposed rafters. One gabled dormer window on each side pierces the roof; they are set with six-light casements.

=== Interior ===
Underneath the shed roof on the front the main entrance has a French door. Behind them, a small hallway leads to doors to the study and service wing, with a double door to the living room on the west, and an open stair. Neoclassicism is the predominant decorative mode—the stairway's newel post is Doric, and the dining room has a pilastered mantelpiece. The living room, extending into the western wing, has a Colonial Revival mantelpiece and double doors to the dining room and south porch.

In the service wing are the kitchen and the former butler's pantry, now outfitted as a supplementary kitchen. A stair leads to bedrooms that were originally servants' quarters. In the main house, the second floor has four beds and two baths. The attic is partially finished, and the basement unfinished.

== History ==
Catt's life prior to her purchase of the property had much to do with why she chose to buy it. She was not always present during her nine years there, but they were nonetheless some of the most productive of her life. Since her tenure it has remained largely as she left it.

=== 1859–1919: Early life of Catt ===
Born Carrie Lane in Wisconsin and raised on her family's farm near Charles City, Iowa, Catt earned a degree from Iowa State University and went to work as first a high school principal, then a school district superintendent. Her first husband, Leo Chapman, a newspaper editor, died shortly after their 1885 marriage.

She had become involved in the movement for women's suffrage. When she remarried, her new husband, George Catt, a wealthy bridge designer and builder who supported suffrage as much as she did, made an agreement with her to let her work for at least four months a year on suffrage. Eventually she became involved with the National American Woman Suffrage Association (NAWSA), the leading group campaigning for it, and succeeded Susan B. Anthony as its president in 1900.

By then the Catts were living in Midtown Manhattan. She stepped down from NAWSA's presidency when George became ill in 1904. He died the next year, followed by Anthony in 1906. Left financially secure by his will, she moved to a more luxurious apartment on Central Park West and became active in NAWSA again.

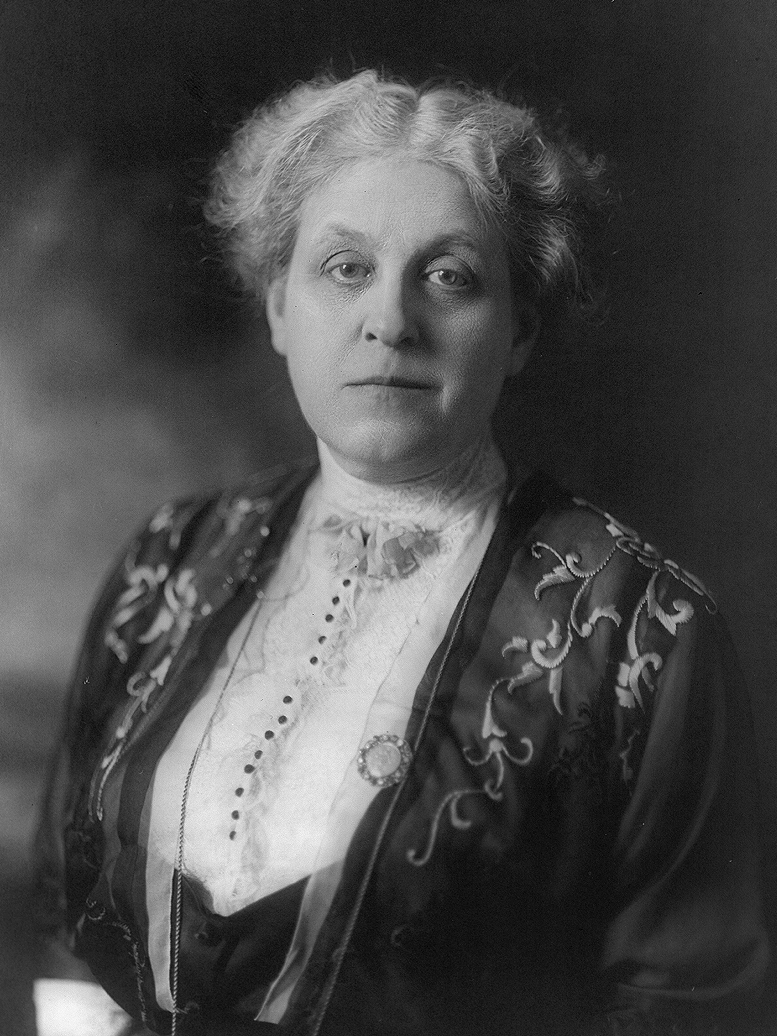
Catt ca. 1914

In 1915 she returned to NAWSA and was re-elected president. She geared the organization's strategy toward what would later become the "Winning Plan", that of lobbying more states to grant women the vote in order to build momentum for a constitutional amendment guaranteeing women's suffrage in federal elections as well. The organization had over two million members in 1917 when the U.S. entered World War I and she put suffrage aside to support the war effort.

In 1919 she saw Juniper Ledge, the name given the property by its previous owners, for the first time. While some sources put its construction date at 1897, 1910 appears far more likely. At the time the growing use of the automobile was beginning to bring suburbanization to the interior of northern Westchester County the way the railroad already had to the county's southern half and the towns along the Hudson River. The many old farms in the area were being subdivided into large residential lots where the occupants derived their income from commuting to jobs in the city instead of farming.

Catt initially saw Juniper Ledge the same way. "I am in love with the place," she wrote of the property. "It is isolated, quiet, restful, and gives promise of fun. There isn't much of any level land; God designed it for tired nerves not profit." At the time of her purchase the house sat on 13 acres (5.3 ha). (Note: This is the lowest number given in any source. Catt herself gave the property's acreage as 16 (6.5 ha); others have said it was an acre (0.4 ha) larger.)

Shortly before she bought it, Congress passed the Nineteenth Amendment, granting women the right to vote. This earned her a congratulatory telegram from President Woodrow Wilson. It still needed to be ratified by three-quarters of the states, and accordingly she traveled the country making speeches and appearing at rallies to that end. During that time, she realized that it was not enough for women to have the vote—many would be voting for the first time, and would need to be supplied with information on which to base their vote but how to play a role in the shaping of public policy. Accordingly, she founded the League of Women Voters (LWV).

=== 1919–1928: Catt in residence ===
At Juniper Ledge she lived with her partner Mary Garret "Mollie" Hay, who lived in and tended the property. Despite her earlier judgement about the land being unsuitable for farming and her finding that the soil was thin and rocky, she and Hay included provisions for some farming among the improvements they made to the property. They improved the driveway and stream, graded the ledge-tops, planted gardens and began raising some chickens and cows. "It is mine for better or worse," she told her biographer, Mary Gray Peck.

Peck herself was impressed with the effort. "Turning through a stone gateway and climbing through a steep grade to the house," she wrote of a visit that summer, "one beheld wide lawn, flower borders, terraced hillside, great outcropping rocks, spire-like junipers, forest trees, old apple trees, and at the end of the climb one looked out over a long and misty valley spread out below, and became aware of the murmur of water as it fell from ledge to ledge down the hill."

In August 1920 the Nineteenth Amendment was ratified by enough states to make it part of the Constitution. The goal of Catt's last several decades was accomplished, but she was not finished. In addition to launching the LWV, she began working for women's suffrage internationally through the International Women's Suffrage Alliance, which she had helped establish in 1904. She remained its president through 1923.

The house became a frequent gathering place for Catt's fellow activists. In June 1921, The New York Times covered a picnic held by a hundred LWV members from New York City to welcome her back from a trip to the West, where she had accepted honorary law degrees from Iowa State, her alma mater, and the University of Wyoming, which had been the first to grant women the vote. She and the guests visited 14 trees on the property to which Catt had affixed bronze plaques in memory or honor of key suffragists like Esther Hobart Morris and LWV president Maud Wood Park.

The trees, or at least some of them, were important to Catt for other reasons. Like many suffragists, she had campaigned for Prohibition, also at that time recently enshrined in the Constitution as the Eighteenth Amendment. Since the berries of the juniper trees were the main ingredient in gin, she told her guests, she had bought the property to make sure they would never be used for that purpose.

Her activism continued. She cowrote a history of the suffrage movement, and continued to travel to Europe and South America for the cause. On one trip, in 1923, she was introduced to Italian dictator Benito Mussolini and personally confronted him about the issue. During her times away, Hay, who felt isolated and lonely at Juniper Ledge, instead rented an apartment in New York.

When she was back at the house, Catt devoted much of her time to the property. At some point during her ownership, she built a house for her chauffeur and added the west wing of the house. She also continued actively farming and gardening it. A 1923 article in Today's Housewife takes note of her memorial grove and describes her "every summer wearing for the most part of the day a wide brimmed hat and summer dress, out among her flowers and vegetables, happy to be back upon the land and to take an interest in crops and stock."

In the mid-1920s, she broadened her activism. Resuming her prewar interest in promoting world peace, she founded the Committee for the Cause and Cure of War in 1925. In 1926 she was among 600 people invited to a meeting at the White House which helped resolve a dispute with Mexico and averted war.

That summer both she and Hay had suffered from poor health at Juniper Ledge. Since her partner had never warmed to country life the way she had, Catt agreed after 1927 that they would sell the house and move somewhere more to their mutual liking. At first they considered moving to Arizona or California, and looked at houses there, but after realizing that they wanted to be close to New York City decided instead to stay in Westchester, buying a cottage near Long Island Sound in New Rochelle. They most likely took the bronze plaques from the trees with them; 9 of the plaques were preserved by suffragist and archivist Edna Stantial, and today are part of Stantial's papers at the Schlesinger Library, Radcliffe Institute, Harvard University.

Hay died of a cerebral hemorrhage shortly after the move. Her death at first had adverse effects on Catt, who suffered a shingles outbreak and then a heart attack. She recovered enough to live until a second heart attack in 1947, although her activism and public life were more limited during those years. Catt and Hay are buried next to each other in the Bronx's Woodlawn Cemetery.

=== 1929–present: Subdivision and preservation ===
After Catt and Hay, the property was further subdivided. The Taconic State Parkway was opened through most of Westchester County by the early 1930s, making it easier to commute by car into the city via the Taconic and the Bronx River Parkway. Land values in areas near parkway exits, like Juniper Ledge, went up as more people sought to live as Catt had. Much of the house's original land was disposed of this way over the next decades, including a parcel with the chauffeur's house, later extensively modified. Eventually only 4 acres (1.6 ha) of Catt's original land were left.

The house itself passed through a variety of hands. Among them were Nora and Peter Roots, who lived there in the early 1950s with their children, Stephanie, Judith and David; and Walter and May Large, who became known locally for their involvement in town activities and generosity, particularly to residents of the nearby hamlet of Millwood. May Large helped found a local women's neighborhood club.

In the early 21st century, the house's past again came to light. Carmino Ravosa, a composer best known for his work on the children's television shows Captain Kangaroo and Shining Time Station, was researching a musical about Briarcliff Manor when he learned of Catt's residence in the area. He was familiar with her life from another musical he had written, and began working to have the house preserved and designated as a landmark. "[P]roviding it is saved," he said, "this house may be the most important thing I've done."

His efforts were rewarded with the state and national register listings in 2004. However, shortly afterward the owner expressed interest in selling the house, and Ravosa began working to find a buyer who would respect its historic importance and maintain it in that form (the only significant change by then had been the enclosure of the porch, which had not come at the expense of any original element of the house). In 2011 the New Castle Town Board recognized it as a local landmark as well.

== Gallery ==
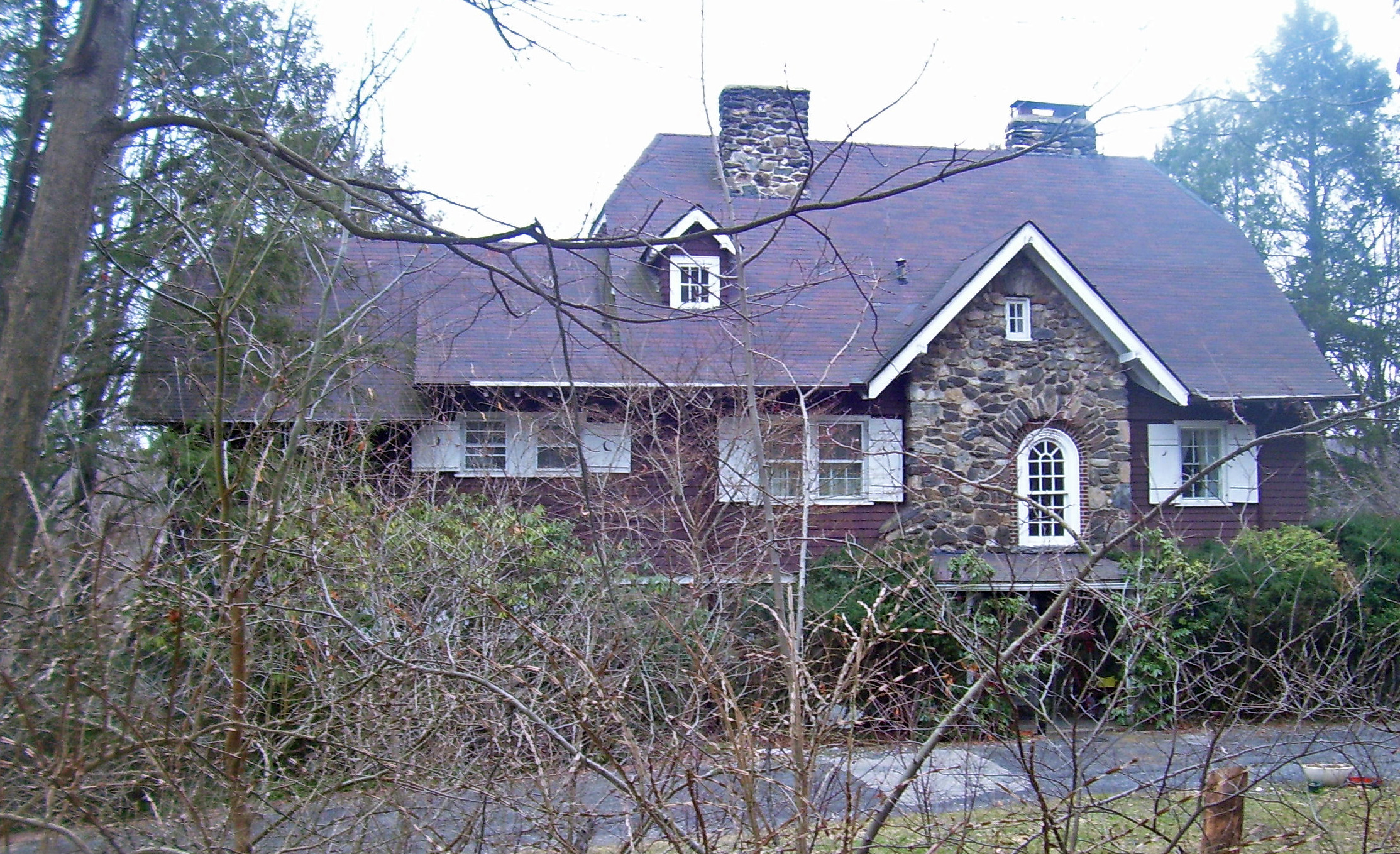
The west side

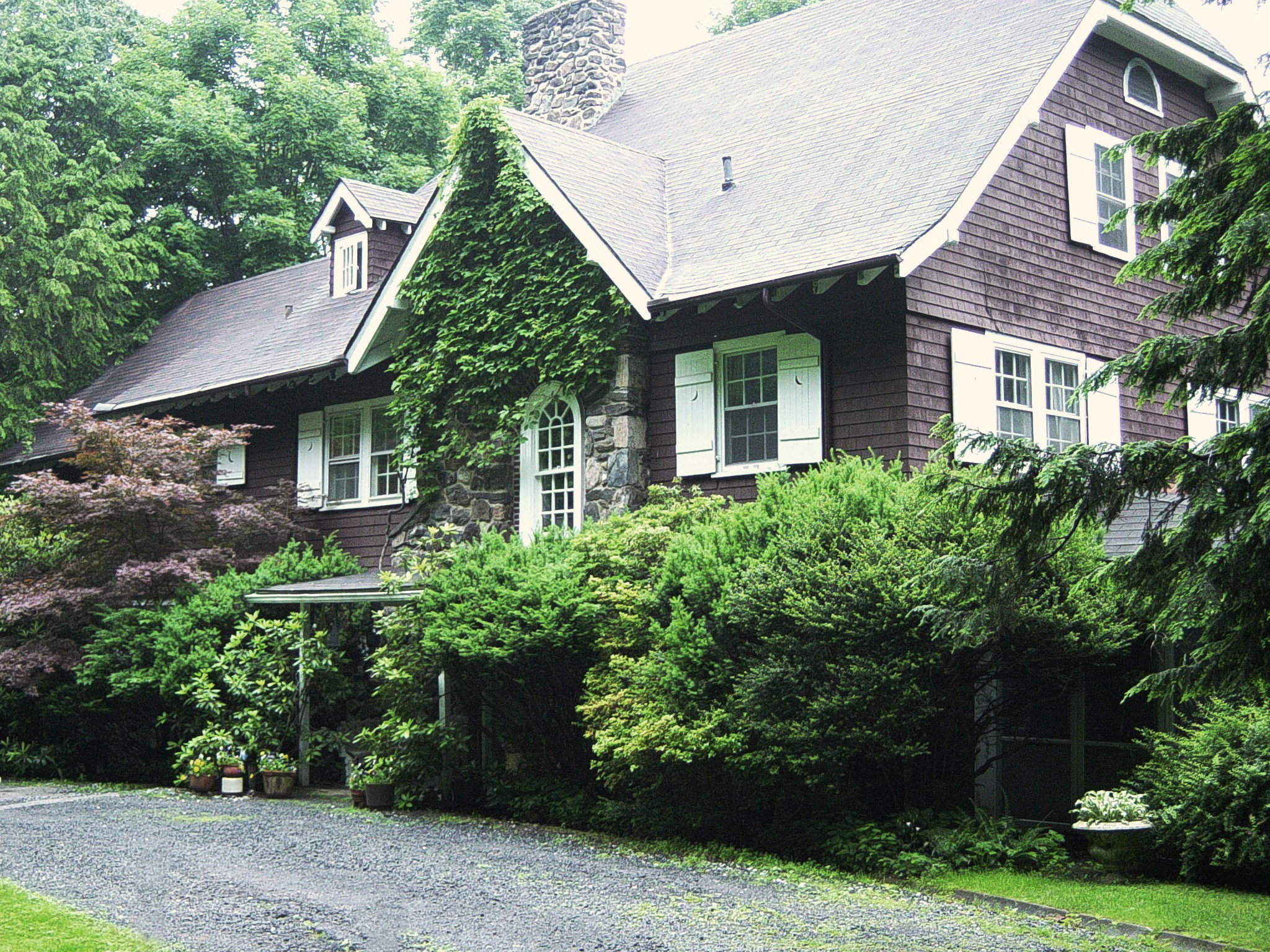
The west side

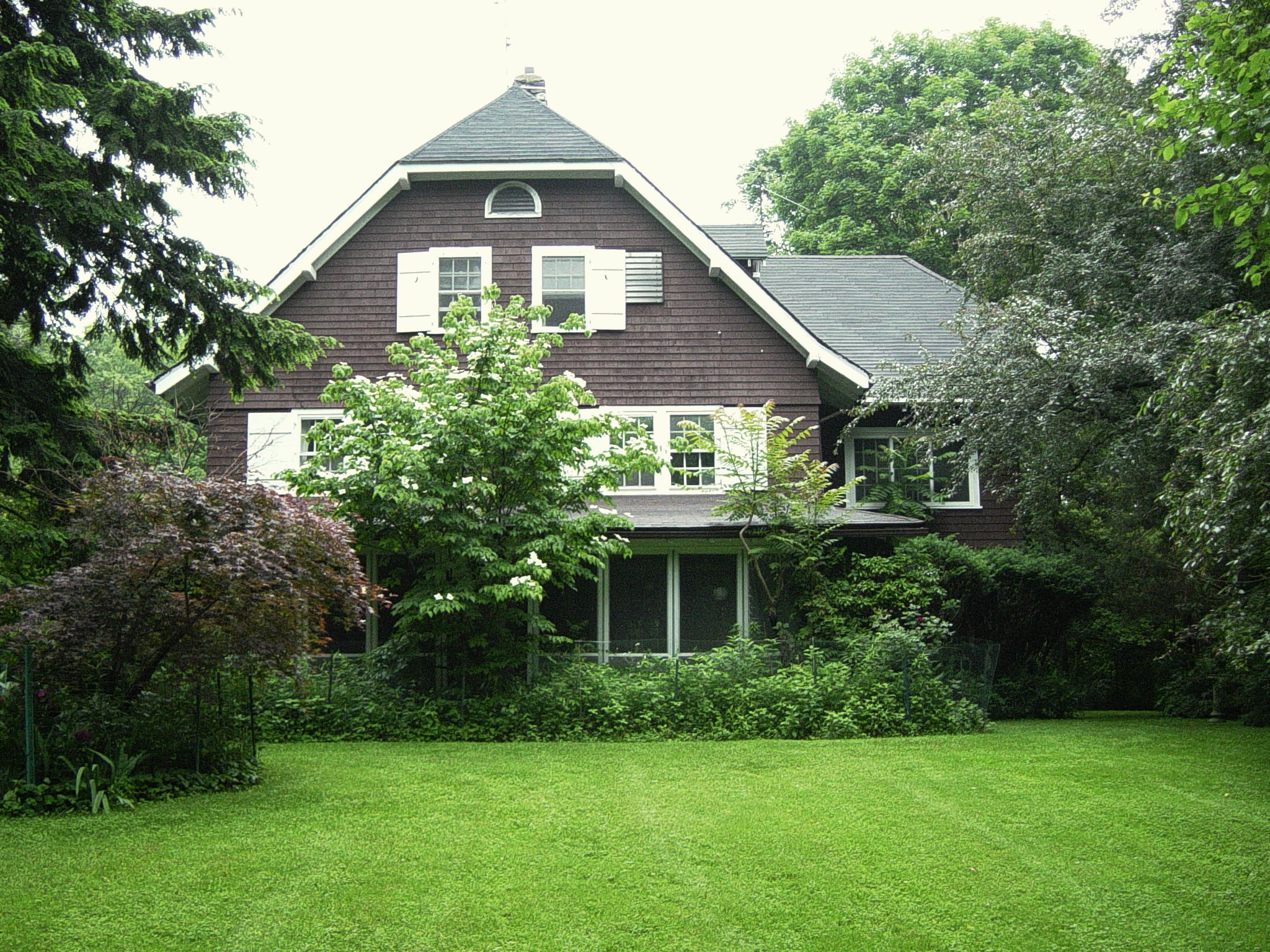
The south side

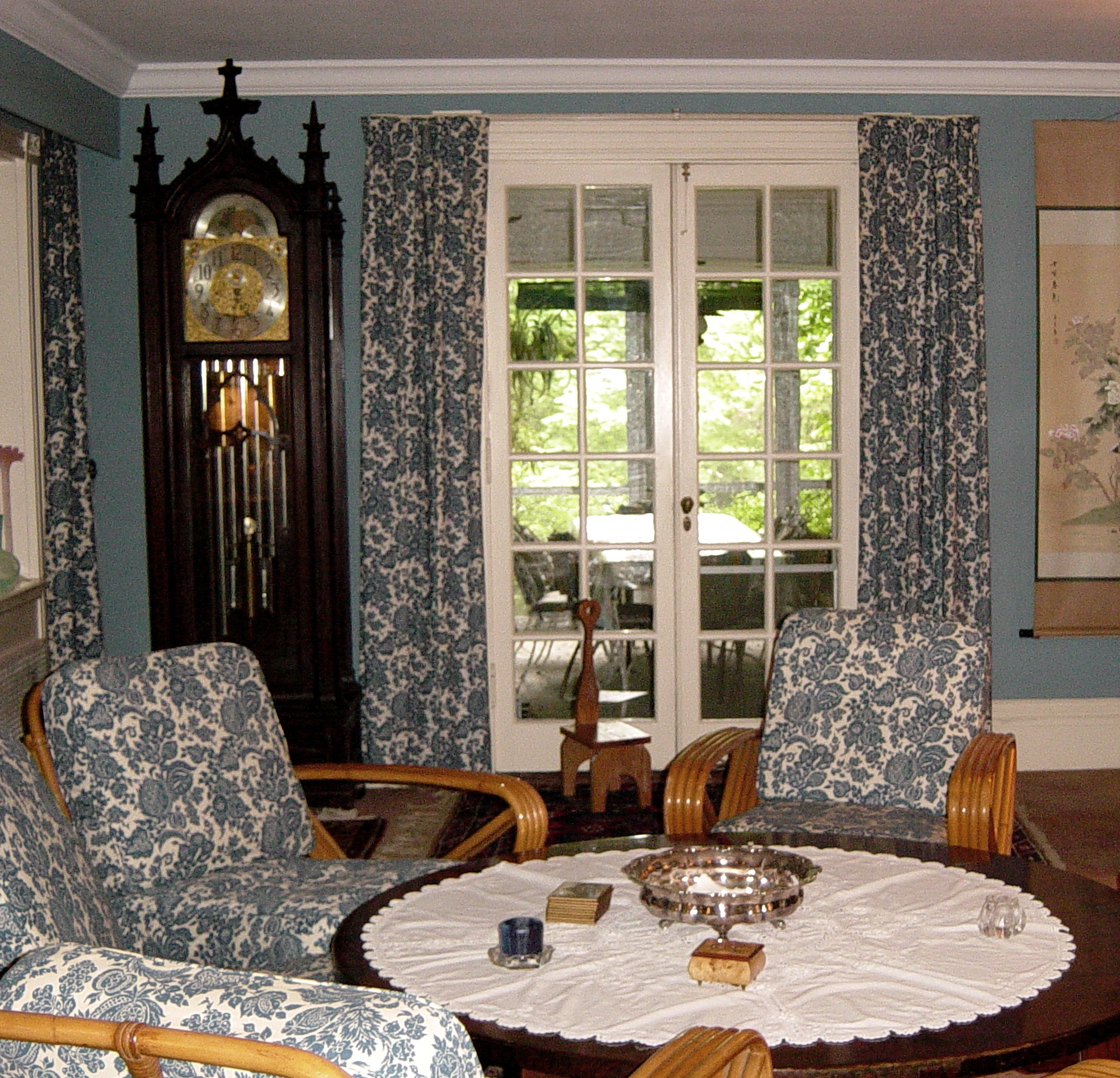
The interior in 2003

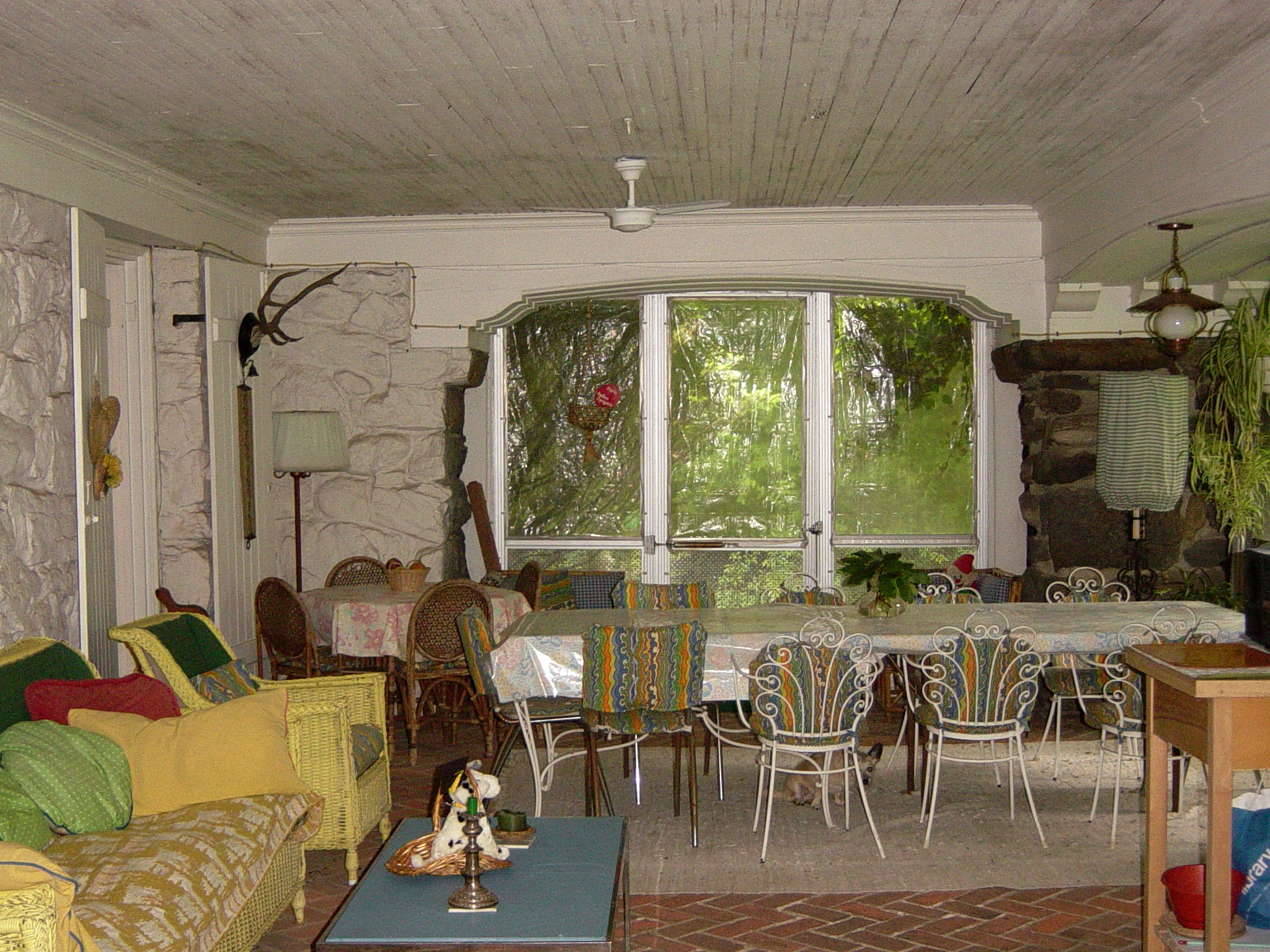
The interior in 2003

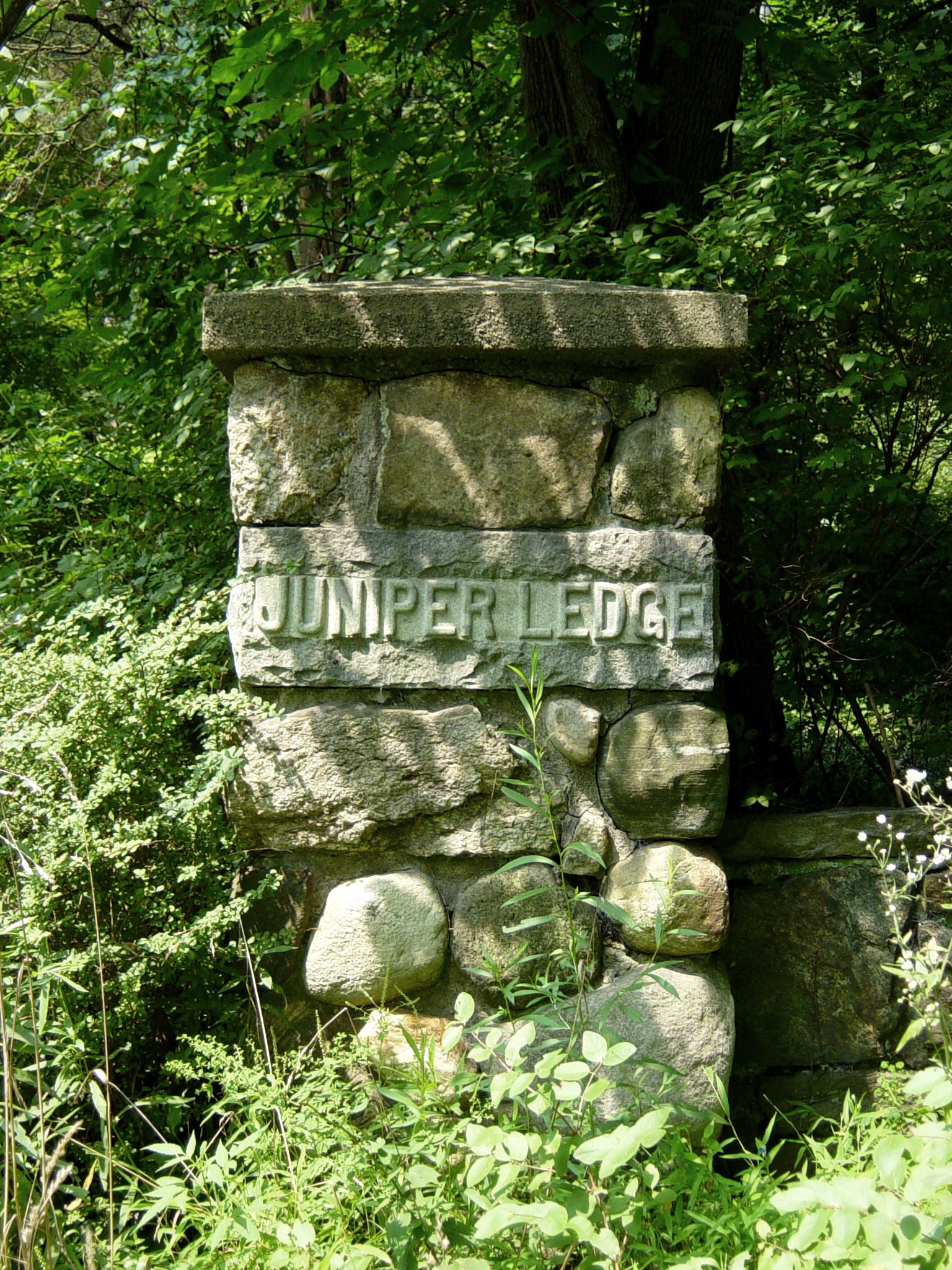
One of two driveway pillars on North State Road

== See also ==
- National Register of Historic Places listings in northern Westchester County, New York
