= Carmino Ravosa =

American composer and lyricist, singer, pianist

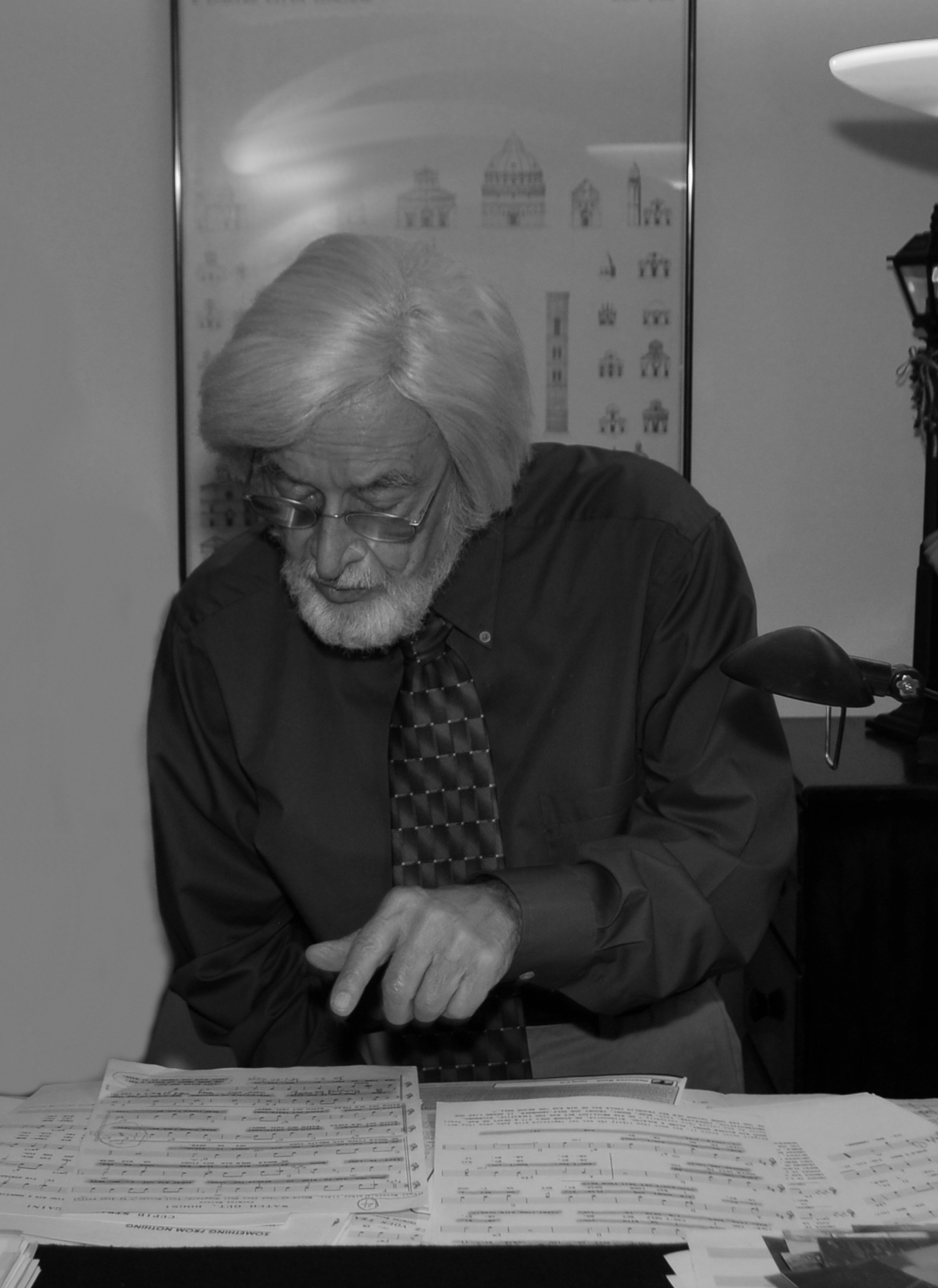
- Born: January 29, 1930; Springfield, Massachusetts
- Died: July 19, 2015 (aged 85); White Plains, New York
- Education: Hartt School of Music
- Occupations: Composer, pianist
- Years active: 1958–2015
- Website: www.carminoravosa.com

Carmino Ravosa (January 29, 1930 – July 19, 2015) was an American composer and lyricist, singer, pianist, as well as a producer, director, and musical historian. Ravosa, who wrote music for children for decades, was one of the most popular songwriters for schools in America. He was an author and editor for Silver Burdett & Ginn's music textbook series "World of Music" and "The Music Connection", and the composer of the theme musicals in the two series. Ravosa also was the songwriter for the CBS children's shows Captain Kangaroo and Romper Room, the PBS program Shining Time Station, and the PBS publication Sesame Street Magazine.

Much of Ravosa's life was spent as an educator. He was the music teacher at Fox Meadow Elementary School in Scarsdale, New York, where his original shows and songs were used in class plays. Subsequently, he was the Composer-in-Residence and Faculty Fellow at the Dalton School, a private school in New York City, and then Composer-in-Residence for the Edison Schools a nationwide charter school system. He was named The Hartt School Alumnus of the Year in 2009 and was honored in 2013 at the Briarcliff Manor-Scarborough Historical Society's annual dinner.

== Early life and family ==
Carmino Ravosa was born on January 29, 1930, in Springfield, Massachusetts, the oldest of three children, and the son of Anello and Elmira Ravosa. His father was an Italian immigrant who owned and operated a milk delivery business and had a strong love of jazz and big band music of the 1930s and 1940s, and was the greatest influence on Carmino's music career. Ravosa and his brother Anthony worked in their father's business for several years. Anthony later went on to become a lawyer and businessman in Springfield. After serving in the United States Army as a corporal in the U.S. Army Band, Ravosa attended The Hartt School of Music and graduated in 1957. He then earned a master's degree in Music Education from The Hartt School in 1965. At the school, he met his wife Claire Colby, who was a voice major there. The two were married for almost 60 years. Ravosa later earned a master's degree and an advanced degree from Columbia University.

With his wife Claire, Ravosa had three children, Carine, Gina, and Dean, and eight grandchildren. Ravosa and his family were prominent residents of the village of Briarcliff Manor in New York. Ravosa wrote numerous shows about the village, and was a musical director, lyricist, and keyboardist for the Briarcliff Manor Centennial Variety Show, a series of performances in 2002 that celebrated the village's centennial. Ravosa was also involved with preservation of Juniper Ledge, the Briarcliff Manor home of Carrie Chapman Catt. He added the home to the New York Register and the National Register of Historic Places. On July 6, 2013, Ravosa was honored by the Briarcliff Manor School District, which uses his music curriculum, during Todd Elementary School's annual fifth-grade concert.

== Career ==
Selections from Carmino Ravosa's Briarcliff show:
You Call It Briarcliff

Only the Best is Good Enough

This Is His Town This is His Village

At The Briarcliff Lodge

Ravosa was a music teacher at the Fox Meadow School in Scarsdale, New York from 1965 to 1978. From 1978 to 1999, he served as Composer-in-Residence and Faculty Fellow at the Dalton School, a private school in New York City, where he was described as a "Dalton legend". From 1999 to 2003, he was the Composer-in-Residence for the Edison Project. He also was a songwriter for the CBS children's shows Captain Kangaroo and Romper Room, the PBS program Shining Time Station, and the PBS publication Sesame Street Magazine. Ravosa was a trustee of the Briarcliff Manor-Scarborough Historical Society and a member of the American Friends of Lafayette.

Ravosa's songs are performed worldwide, including in Kaiserslautern, Germany, where nearly 170 children performed Ravosa's musical "Friends". Ravosa is also known for his songs published by Silver Burdett & Ginn and numerous songs with themes related to United States history.

Ravosa died on July 19, 2015, at the age of 85.

=== Performances ===
Ravosa performed his music at many historic landmarks, including:

- Buckman Tavern in Lexington, Massachusetts
- The Elijah Miller House in White Plains, New York
- Fraunces Tavern in New York City
- John Adams's home Peacefield in Quincy, Massachusetts
- Knapp's Tavern in Greenwich, Connecticut
- The New Windsor Cantonment State Historic Site in New Windsor, New York
- Paul Revere's home in Boston, Massachusetts
- Thomas Paine's home in New Rochelle, New York
- Washington's Headquarters in Newburgh, New York
- Washington Irving's home Sunnyside in Irvington, New York

Ravosa performed his songs "Shh! We're Writing the Constitution" and "From George to George" at the inaugural ceremony of President George H. W. Bush and again at the Smithsonian Institution's National Museum of American History on President's day in honor of President George W. Bush. Ravosa also gave a solo command performance of his musical "Ghosts in the White House" for President Jimmy Carter and First Lady Rosalynn Carter on October 30, 1978, at the White House Halloween party. About 600 White house staffers and their families attended.

His musical "Seneca Falls: A Documusical on the History of Women's Rights and Achievements", a work about the history of women's rights, was performed at the National Women's Hall of Fame. The show was also performed on October 28, 1976, at the Women's Hall of Fame's Second National Honors Ceremony at Carnegie Hall. Another musical that he composed, "Scarecrow" (based on Nathaniel Hawthorne's short story "Feathertop"), won four major awards at the International Light Opera Festival in Waterford, Ireland.

=== Publications ===
Ravosa's first published work was "Johnny Appleseed – A Musical Play for Children", which was published by G. Schirmer, Inc. and Associated Music Publishers, Inc. in 1958. Two of Ravosa's songs were included in HBO's 2011 Independence Day documentary, Citizen USA, directed by Emmy Award-winning film journalist Alexandra Pelosi. The documentary focuses on the stories of new citizens across every US state. The film, Ravosa's national television debut, included a clip of him singing and playing "It's a Whole Other Country, Texas Is" and others singing a segment of his song "Let's Hear it for America".

== Selected works ==
- Ravosa, Carmino C. (1975). Glorious morning : a documentary musical based on Sam Adams and John Hancock and the battle of Lexington and Concord, April, 1775. Rowayton, Connecticut: New Plays for Children. OCLC 36562802.

== See also ==
- List of American composers
- List of singer-songwriters
