= Lucius and Maria Clinton Lane House =

Historic house in Iowa, United States

- U.S. National Register of Historic Places
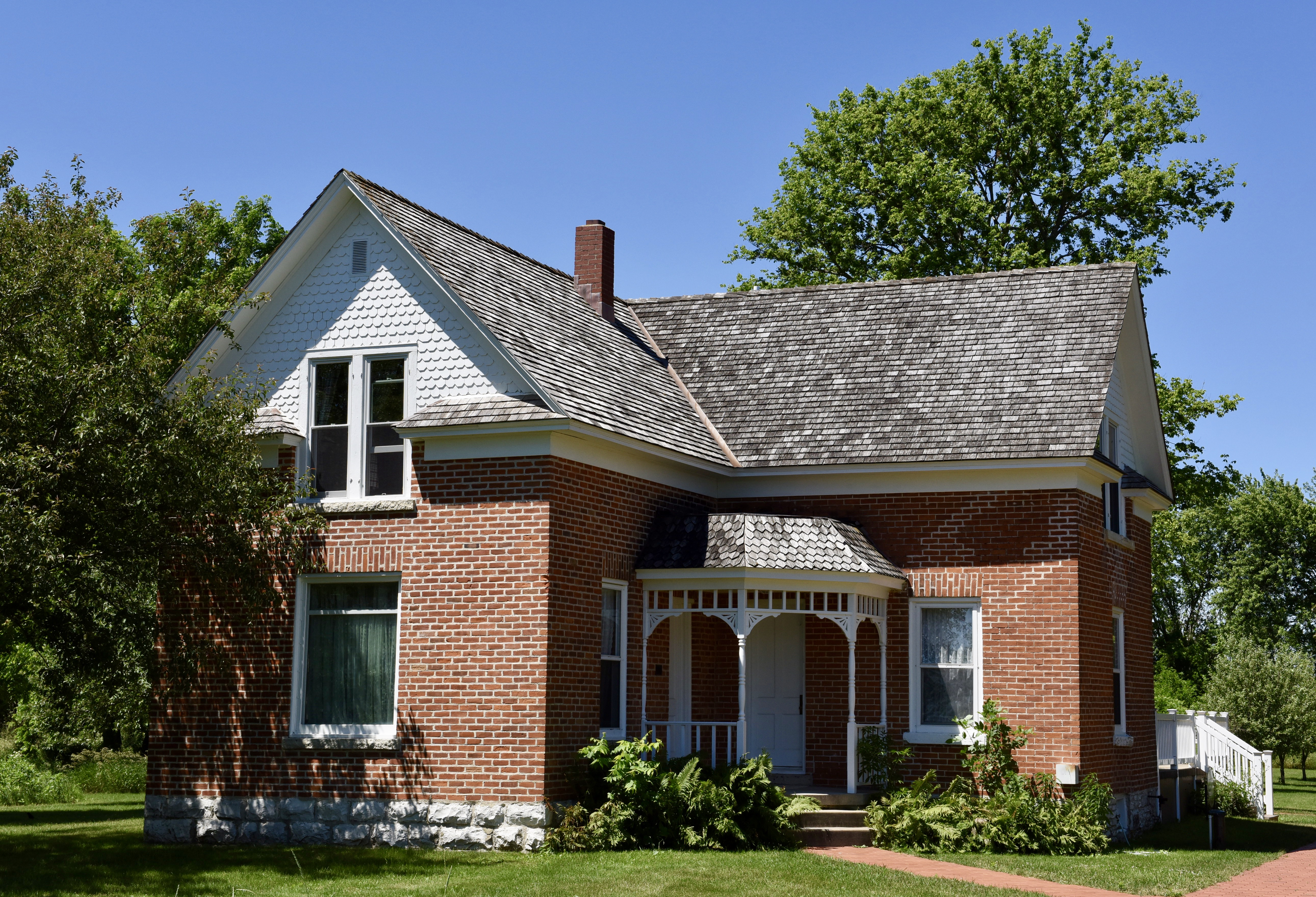

- Location within Iowa Location within the United States
- Location: 2379 Timber Ave.
- Nearest city: Charles City, Iowa
- Coordinates: 43°0′45″N 92°39′15″W
- Area: 4.1 acres (1.7 ha)
- Built: 1866
- Built by: Lucius Lane
- Architectural style: Late Victorian
- NRHP reference No.: 95000384
- Added to NRHP: June 25, 1998

The Lucius and Maria Clinton Lane House, also known as the Carrie Lane Chapman Catt Family Home, is a historic building located west of Charles City, Iowa, United States. It was listed on the National Register of Historic Places in 1998. The 1½-story, Late Victorian hollow brick structure was built in 1866 by Lucius Lane. The west wing may predate the rest of the house, being the log cabin that existed on the property when Lane bought it. When building this house, it is possible that Lane was influenced by A. J. Downing's work, The Architecture of Country Houses (1850), which describes hollow brick wall construction, and Woodward's Country Homes (1865), which features a nearly identical floor plan to this house.

The house's primary significance is its association with Carrie Chapman Catt, a leader in the American women's suffrage movement. She moved to this farm as a girl, and her father built the house. It was here that the attitudes that would guide her later life were formed during the 1872 Presidential election when she realized her mother Maria had no legal right to vote. She was educated down the road at a country school, and rode by horseback to Charles City for high school. She graduated from Iowa State College in 1880, the only woman in a class of 17, and she became a teacher in Mason City, Iowa. She taught for two years, and was the superintendent of schools there for three years. In 1885 she married her first husband Leo Chapman in this house. He died within the year of typhoid fever, and she moved to Charles City. She married George Catt in 1890, the same year her parents moved from this house into town.
