= Today's Housewife =

American women's magazine

Today's Housewife was an American women's magazine in the early 20th century.

== History and profile ==
The magazine was started in May 1905 under the name Today's Magazine. It was published by the Canton Magazine Co. until January 1917. The magazine was based in Canton, Ohio. Advertising of the time period boasted an initial circulation in excess of 1 million. Publisher and editor George A. McClellan managed and owned the publication. In 1917 it incorporated The Housewife (founded 1882) in 1917. From February 1917 to May 1927 it was published under the name Today's Housewife. During this period the publisher was the Geiger-Crist Co., Cooperstown, in New York. It appears the publication changed its name to Today's Housewife and Woman and Home in 1927 and Today's Woman and Home in January 1928. The magazine was published with this title until September 1928 when it ceased publication.
