= Carrie Chapman Catt =

American social reformer and suffragist (1859–1947)

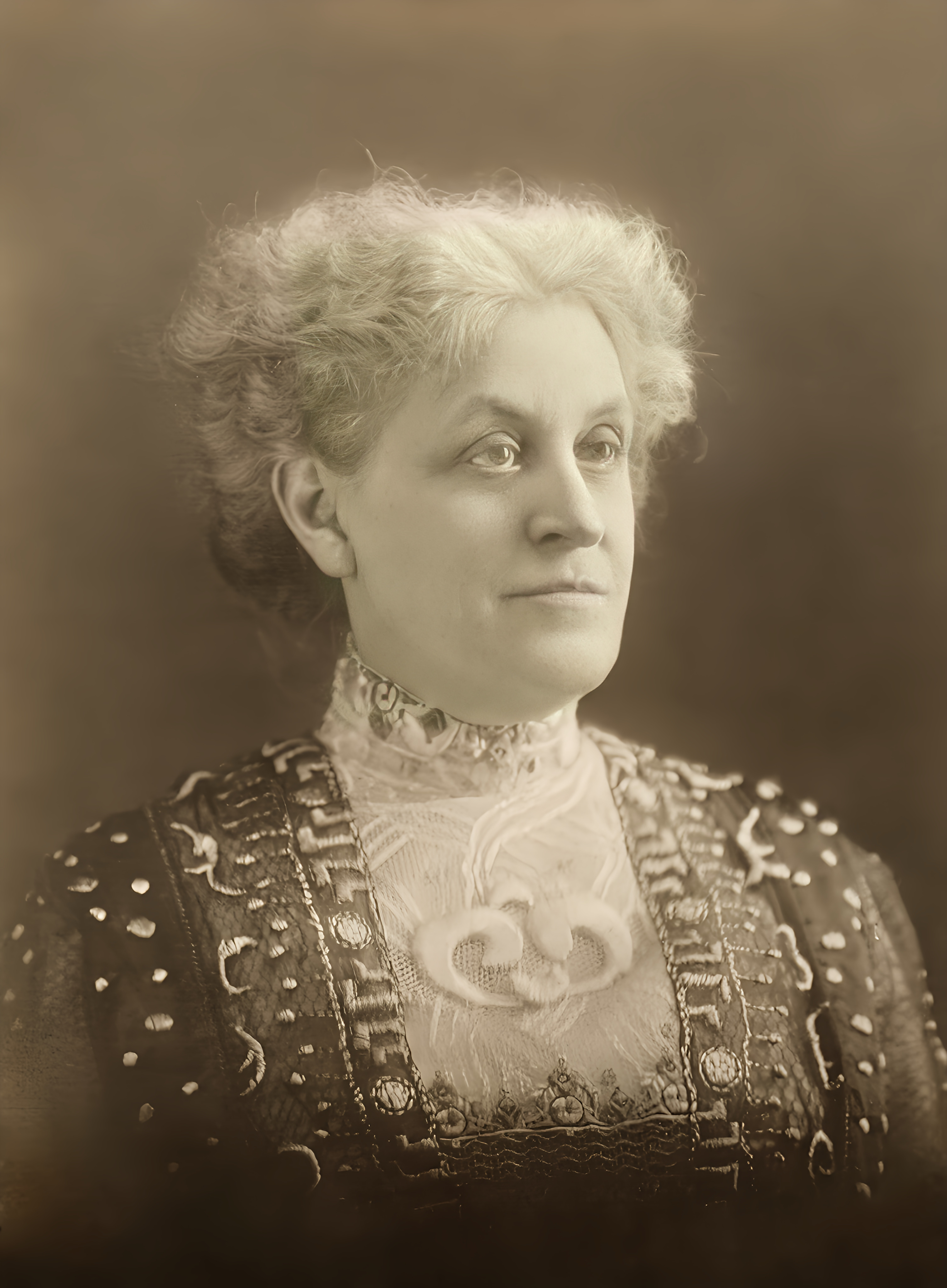
- Catt in 1913
- Born: Carrie Clinton Lane; January 9, 1859; Ripon, Wisconsin, U.S.
- Died: March 9, 1947 (aged 88); New Rochelle, New York, U.S.
- Resting place: Woodlawn Cemetery
- Education: Iowa State University (1880)
- Spouses: Leo Chapman (m. 1885; died 1886) George Catt (m. 1890; died 1905)
- Partner: Mary “Mollie” Garret Hay

Signature
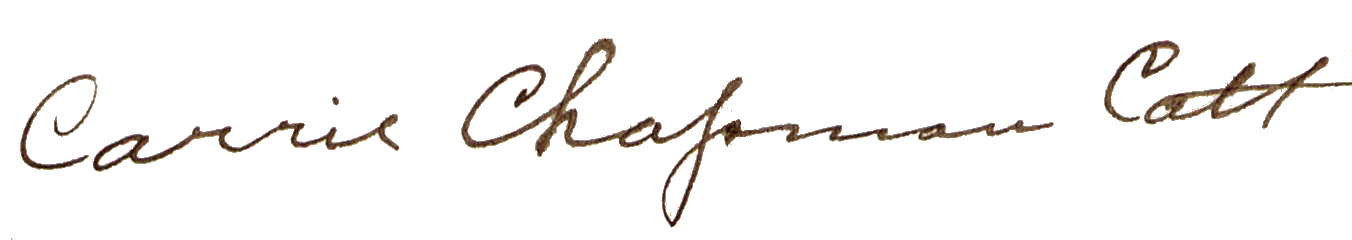

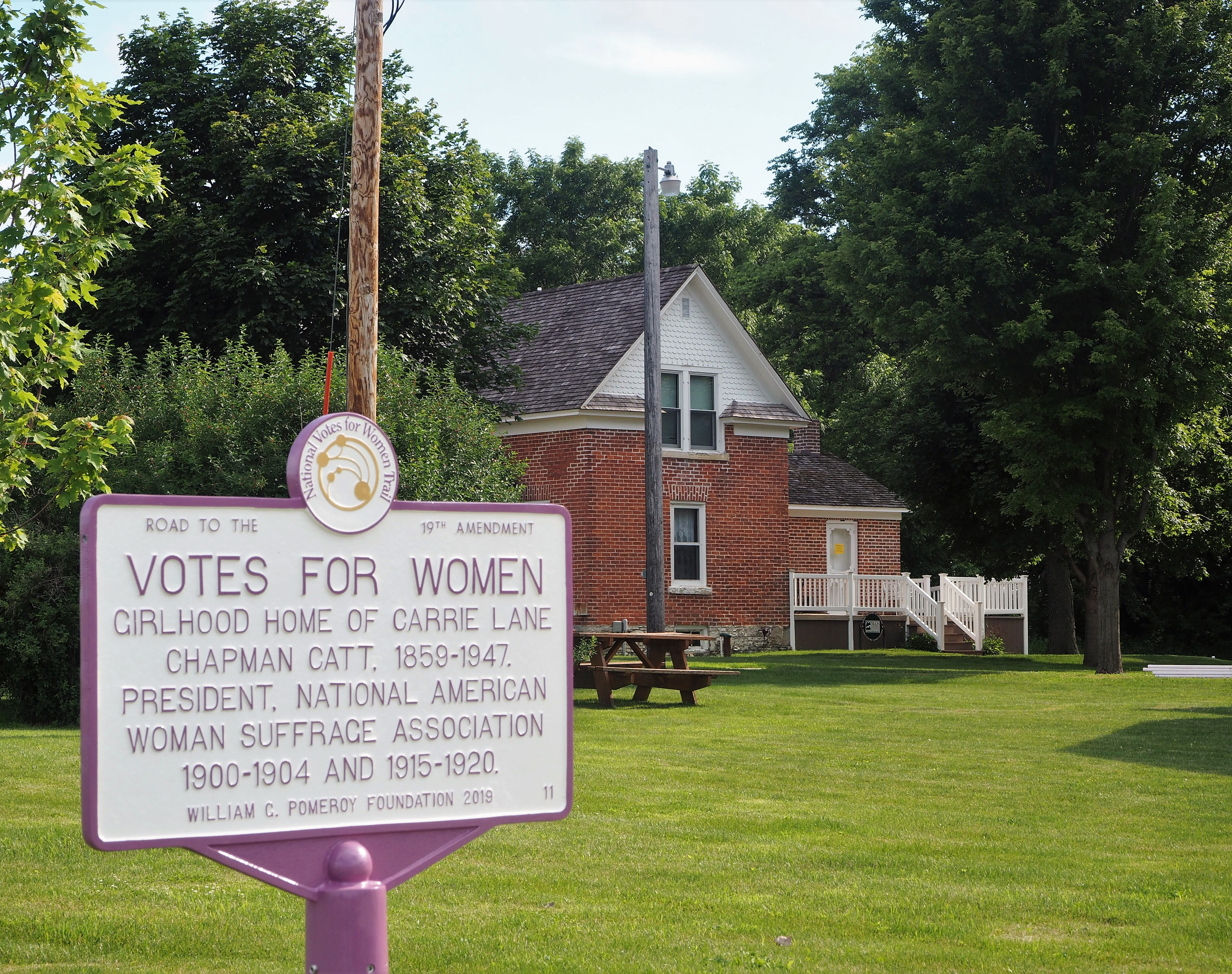
Carrie Lane Chapman Catt's girlhood home with Suffrage Trail Marker visible in Charles City, Iowa. Photo uploaded with permission of the National Nineteenth Amendment Society.

Carrie Chapman Catt (born Carrie Clinton Lane; January 9, 1859 – March 9, 1947) was an American women's suffrage leader who campaigned for the Nineteenth Amendment to the United States Constitution, which gave U.S. women the right to vote in 1920. Catt served as president of the National American Woman Suffrage Association from 1900 to 1904 and 1915 to 1920. She founded the League of Women Voters in 1920 and the International Woman Suffrage Alliance in 1904, which was later named International Alliance of Women. She "led an army of voteless women in 1919 to pressure Congress to pass the constitutional amendment giving them the right to vote and convinced state legislatures to ratify it in 1920". She "was one of the best-known women in the United States in the first half of the twentieth century and was on all lists of famous American women."

== Early life ==
Carrie Clinton Lane was born on January 9, 1859, in Ripon, Wisconsin, the daughter of Maria Louisa (née Clinton) and Lucius Lane. When Catt was seven years old, her family moved to rural Charles City, Iowa. As a child, Catt was interested in science and wanted to become a doctor. After graduating from high school in 1877, she enrolled at Iowa Agricultural College (now Iowa State University) in Ames, Iowa.

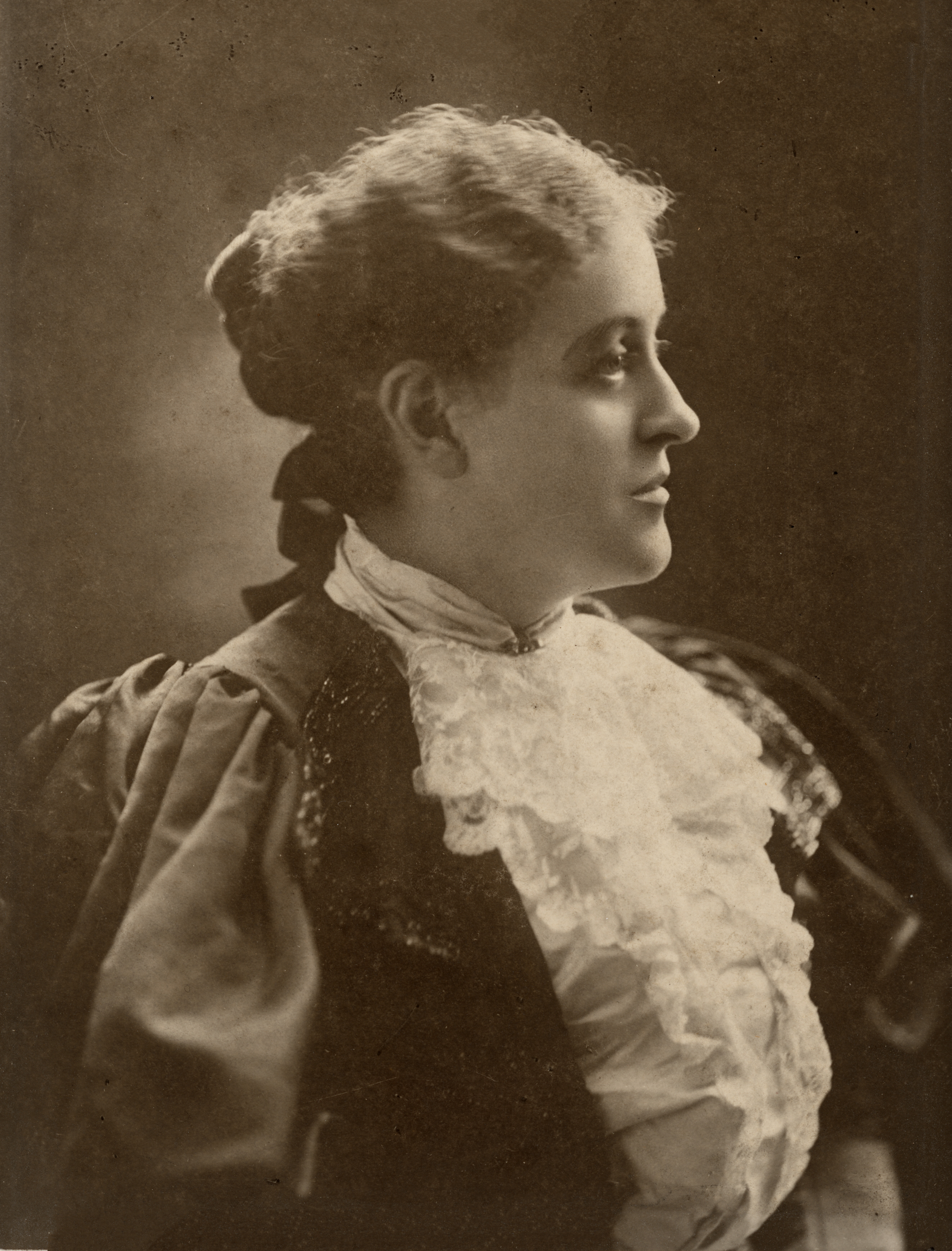
Catt circa 1901

Catt's father was initially reluctant to allow her to attend college, but he relented, contributing only a part of the costs. To pay her expenses, Catt worked as a dishwasher, in the school library, and as a teacher at rural schools during school breaks. Her freshman class consisted of 27 students, six of whom were female. Catt joined the Crescent Literary Society, a student organization aimed at advancing student learning skills and self-confidence. Although only men were allowed to speak extemporaneously in meetings, Catt demanded to be allowed to do the same thing. This started a discussion about women's participation in the group and ultimately led to women gaining the right to speak in meetings. Catt was also a member of Pi Beta Phi, started an all girls' debate club, and advocated for women's participation in military drills.

After four years at Iowa State, Catt graduated on November 10, 1880, with a Bachelor of Science degree, the only female in her graduating class. Iowa State did not name valedictorians during Catt's time there, so there is no way to know her class rank.

She first worked as a law clerk after graduating. She became a teacher and quickly advanced, becoming superintendent of schools in Mason City, Iowa, in 1885. She was the first female superintendent of the district.

== Marriage ==
In February 1885, Catt married newspaper editor Leo Chapman. She remained with her parents on the family farm in Iowa when her husband traveled to California to find a job and a place for them to live. Catt left for California after receiving a telegram that her husband was ill with typhoid fever. While she was enroute, Catt learned that her husband died in August 1886. She remained for a while in San Francisco, where she wrote freelance articles and canvassed for newspaper ads, but she returned to Iowa in 1887.

She was a young 28- and 29-year-old widow when she wrote "Zenobia" (1887) and "The American Sovereign" (1888). In 1890, she married George Catt, a wealthy engineer and alumnus of Iowa State University. Catt continued to lecture and wrote the speeches "Subject and Sovereign" in 1893 and "Danger to Our Government" in 1894. George Catt also encouraged her involvement in women's suffrage. As a result, she was able to spend a good part of each year on the road campaigning for suffrage, a cause she had become involved with during the late 1880s.

== Role in women's suffrage ==
=== National American Woman Suffrage Association ===
==== Early years ====
In 1887, Catt returned to Charles City, where she had grown up, and became involved in the Iowa Woman Suffrage Association. From 1890-1892, Catt served as the Iowa association's state organizer and group's recording secretary. During her time in office, Catt began working nationally for the National American Woman Suffrage Association (NAWSA), and was a speaker at its 1890 convention in Washington, D.C. In 1892, Susan B. Anthony asked Catt to address Congress on the proposed woman's suffrage amendment.

After working her first suffrage campaign in South Dakota in 1890, which went down in defeat, Catt was asked to coordinate the suffrage campaign in Colorado. She arrived in Denver in early September 1893 and worked until Election Day. Catt traveled more than a thousand miles throughout the Rockies during the next two months and visited 29 of Colorado's 63 counties. Colorado passed women's suffrage in November 1893, becoming the second state to give women the right to vote and the first where suffrage was won by popular vote.

By the 1895 national convention of the NAWSA, Catt was proposing major changes in the structure of the organization. "The great need of the hour is organization. Suffrage is today the strongest reform there is in this country, but it is represented by the weakest organization", the Woman's Journal reported. "Catt organized and then headed a new Organization Committee with a budget of $5,000 and power so extensive that it became the center of women suffrage in the United States."

The 1896 NAWSA Convention was notable for its debate about Elizabeth Cady Stanton's book, The Woman's Bible, in which Stanton challenged traditional religious beliefs that women are inferior to men and should be passive. Many NAWSA members feared that the book would damage the suffrage movement by alienating its more orthodox members. Catt and Anthony, NAWSA's president at the time, met with Stanton prior to its publication to voice their concerns, but Stanton was unmoved. Catt and another future NAWSA president, Anna Howard Shaw, supported a resolution stating that "NAWSA has no official connection with the so-called Woman's Bible."

During the 1898 national convention of the NAWSA, one of the most outstanding speakers was African American activist Mary Church Terrell. She and Catt first became acquainted at that time and formed a life-long friendship.

==== First presidency, 1900–1904 ====
In 1900, Catt became president of the NAWSA as Susan B. Anthony's handpicked successor. Anthony knew Catt had the skills to carry the movement forward and her election to the presidency was nearly unanimous. She served her first term as NAWSA president until 1904, when she stepped down to care for her ailing husband, George Catt, who died in 1905.

In her first year as NAWSA president, she led a delegation to the 1900 Republican Party national convention, which allowed the suffragists 10 minutes to speak. The Democrats refused to hear them at all. That year in Oregon, a second campaign for woman suffrage failed. During the winter of 1902–1903, Catt worked the New Hampshire amendment campaign in the midst of bitter cold, but lost by a vote of 14,162 to 21,788.

In 1902, Catt called for an international meeting of women that would coincide with the annual convention of NAWSA. Seven of the eight countries with women's suffrage sent delegates. Representatives from Chile, Hungary, Russia, Turkey and Switzerland also attended. Vida Goldstein of Australia, Florence Fenwick Miller of England, and Catt together wrote a Declaration of Principles that all the delegates signed that included this statement: "That men and women are born equally free and independent members of the human race; equally endowed with talents and intelligence, and equally entitled to the free exercise of their individual rights and liberty." This formed the beginning of the International Woman Suffrage Alliance, an organization that exists today as the International Alliance for Women.

During the national NAWSA convention held in New Orleans in 1903, Catt and Anthony were attacked by the press for allowing black membership in NAWSA and, in the case of Anthony, for permitting a letter she had written to be read before an all-black audience in New York City. Southern delegates made speeches calling for only white women to have the vote. Catt's reply: "We are all of us apt to be arrogant on the score of our Anglo-Saxon blood but we must remember that ages ago the ancestors of the Anglo-Saxons were regarded as so low and embruted that the Romans refused to have them for slaves. The Anglo-Saxon is the dominant race today but things may change. The race that will be dominant through the ages will be the one that proves itself the most worthy. ... Miss Kearney is right in saying that the race problem is the problem of the whole country and not that of the South alone. The responsibility for it is partly ours but if the North shipped slaves to the South and sold them, remember that the North has sent some money since then into the South to help undo part of the wrong that it did to you and to them. Let us try to get nearer together and to understand each other's ideas on the race question and solve it together."

==== Second presidency, 1915–1920 ====
Catt was reelected as NAWSA president in 1915, following Shaw's presidency. Under her leadership, Catt increased the size and influence of the organization. In 1916, at the NAWSA convention in Atlantic City, New Jersey, she unveiled her "Winning Plan", to "make the Federal Amendment our ultimate aim and work in the States a program of preparedness to win nation-wide suffrage by amendment of the National Constitution." According to suffragist Maud Wood Park, who was NAWSA's chief lobbyist at this time, Catt's Winning Plan had four components: First, the states where women had presidential suffrage would lobby their state legislatures to send resolutions to Congress in support of a federal amendment. Second, women living in states where they might secure suffrage by state action would attempt to secure it. Third, suffragists in most states would advocate for presidential suffrage, and fourth, Southern states would advocate for primary suffrage.

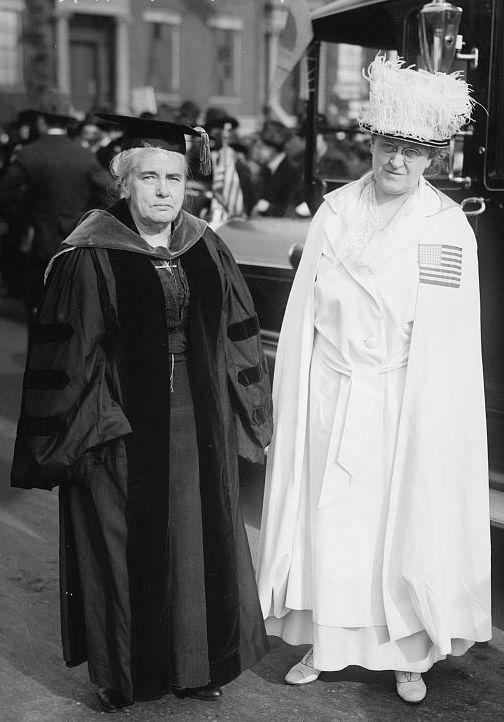
Anna Howard Shaw and Carrie Chapman Catt in 1917

Under Catt's leadership, the movement focused on success by first working for women's suffrage in New York state. Before 1917, only western states had granted female suffrage. After a 1915 campaign failed to win women in New York the right to vote, Catt redoubled her efforts. In 1917 the state approved suffrage. Although Catt, as a resident of New York, had obtained full suffrage, she kept working toward a federal suffrage amendment.

In 1917, President Woodrow Wilson went before a joint session of Congress to request a declaration of war against Germany. Both the Senate and House voted to approve the United States' entry into World War I.

Catt made the controversial decision to support the war effort, which shifted the public's perception in favor of the suffragists, who were now perceived as patriotic. The suffrage movement received the support of President Wilson in January 1918. On January 10, 1918, the House voted on the suffrage amendment, which passed by one more vote needed for the required 2/3 majority. The following day, Catt wrote all of the state suffrage association presidents asking them to begin work at once to win the votes of the U.S. Senators. The vote in the Senate was finally taken on October 1, 1918, and the proposed amendment lost by two votes. On November 11, 1918, the armistice ending World War I was declared.

During a second vote in the Senate on February 10, 1919, the women's suffrage amendment lost by one vote. However, during the 1918 election, suffrage supporters were elected to Congress through targeted efforts by leaders in the movement. The suffrage question came up again before the House on May 21, 1919, and this time it passed by a vote of 304 ayes and 89 nays. The amendment then moved to the Senate, where it passed the needed 2/3 majority by two votes on June 4. Mary Garrett Hay wrote that "CCC danced all over the place and then settled down to THINK."

Catt led the battle for ratification of the 19th Amendment, which required the approval of 36 state legislatures (3/4 of the then 48 states.) She urged friends of the amendment not to allow it to come to a vote in their state unless they were sure it would pass. However, opponents introduced the bill into their state legislatures. One by one, Southern states voted the measure down: in Georgia, Alabama, Virginia, Maryland, South Carolina, Delaware, Florida, North Carolina, Louisiana and Mississippi. Since the late 19th century, they had passed state amendments that effectively disfranchised African American males. They had no interest in expanding the franchise.

The governors of Connecticut and Vermont refused to call their legislatures into session to vote on the issue. One more state loss and the amendment would be defeated.

The final battle took place in the state of Tennessee. Catt was there to lead the campaign through the hot summer months in Nashville in 1920. She wrote to the Woman Citizen, "Never in the history of politics has there been such a force for evil, such a nefarious lobby as labored to block the advance of suffrage in Nashville, Tenn. ... They appropriated our telegrams, tapped our telephones, listened outside our windows and transoms. They attacked our private and public lives." The vote count was so close that each side believed it could easily be defeated.

The proposed amendment easily passed the Tennessee Senate, but then moved to the House where – after many delays and many days of debate – it passed by one vote.

At her welcome home reception in New York City, Catt said: "Now that we have the vote let us remember we are no longer petitioners. We are not wards of the nation, but free and equal citizens. Let us do our part to keep it a true and triumphant democracy." After endless lobbying by Catt and the NAWSA, the suffrage movement culminated in the adoption of the 19th Amendment to the U.S. Constitution on August 26, 1920. The 19th Amendment enfranchised 27 million women, making it the largest single expansion of voting rights in American history.

Catt retired from her national suffrage work after the 19th Amendment was ratified in 1920. Before she retired, she established the League of Women Voters on February 14, 1920, at the NAWSA national convention in Chicago to encourage women to use their right to vote. In 1923, with Nettie Rogers Shuler, she published Woman Suffrage and Politics: The Inner Story of the Suffrage Movement.

=== International women's suffrage movement ===
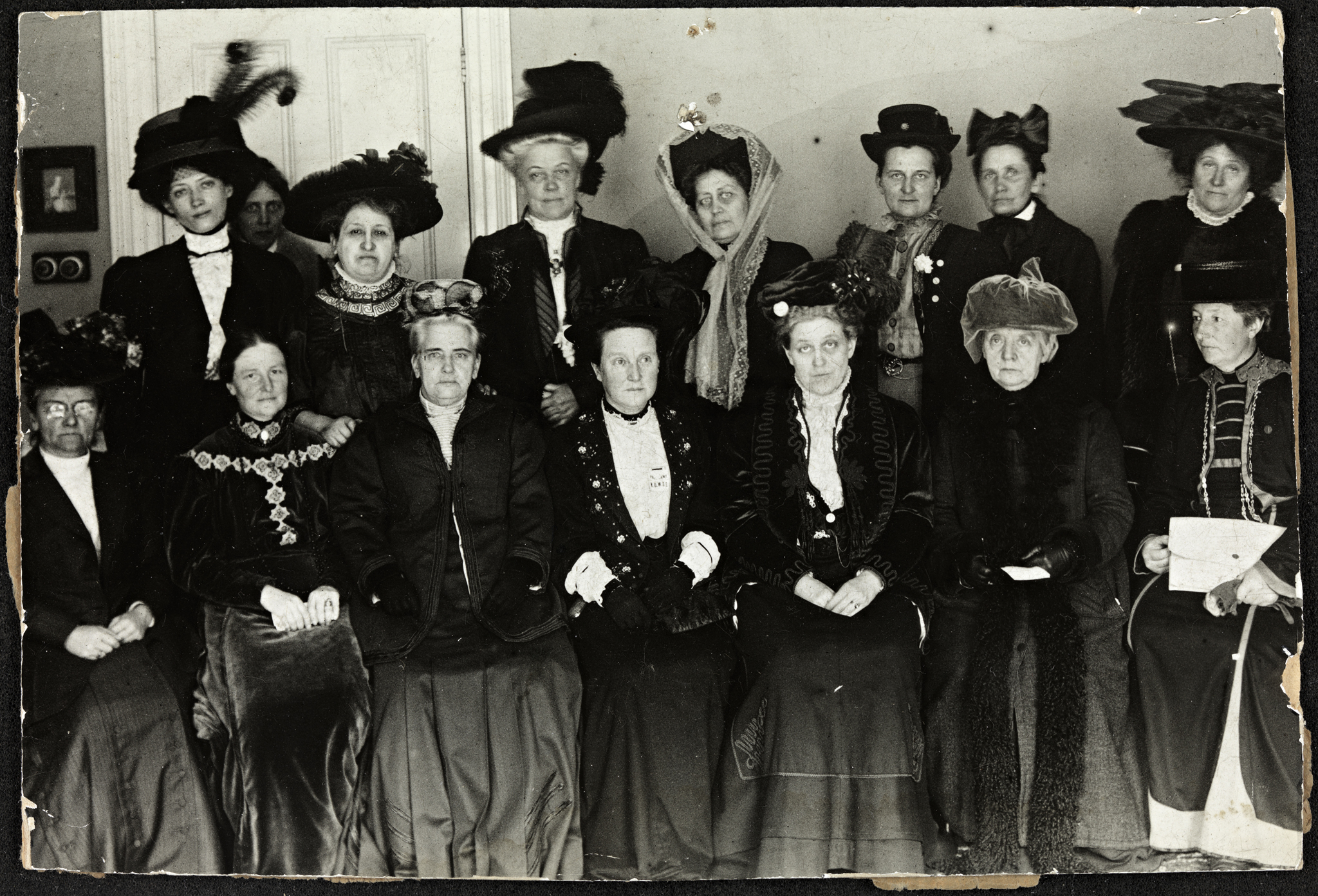
Suffrage Alliance Congress with Millicent Fawcett presiding, London 1909. Top row from left: Thora Dangaard (Denmark), Louise Qvam (Norway), Aletta Jacobs (Netherlands), Annie Furuhjelm (Finland), Madame Mirowitch (Russia), Käthe Schirmacher (Germany), Madame Honneger, unidentified. Bottom left: Unidentified, Anna Bugge (Sweden), Anna Howard Shaw (U.S.), Millicent Fawcett (Presiding, England), Carrie Chapman Catt (U.S.), F. M. Qvam (Norway), Anita Augspurg (Germany).

Catt was also a leader of the international women's suffrage movement. She helped to found the International Woman Suffrage Alliance (IWSA) in 1902, which eventually incorporated sympathetic associations in 32 nations. She served as its president from 1904 until 1923. After George Catt's death in 1905, Catt spent much of the following eight years as IWSA president promoting equal-suffrage rights worldwide. After she retired from NAWSA, she continued to help women around the world to gain the right to vote. The IWSA remains in existence today, now as the International Alliance of Women, with 31 full members and 24 associate members.

Catt first had the idea of an international woman suffrage organization in 1900; by 1902 she decided to begin with an exploratory meeting of women from as many countries as possible. The first meeting of the IWSA was held in Berlin, Germany, with 33 delegates present. Catt was elected president. African American suffragist Mary Church Terrell was one of the delegates from the United States and addressed the meeting in three languages. Each international meeting was held in a different city, membership grew, and successes in women's rights were reported and discussed. The international meeting held in Budapest in 1913 was the largest in the history of the organization, with 500 delegates attending. The world's press had 230 representatives and 2,800 visitors came to listen and learn.

Following her first term as president of NAWSA, Catt engaged in international suffrage work from 1906 to 1913. On a single trip around the world from departure from New York on April 1, 1911, to arrival in San Francisco on November 4, 1912, Catt spoke and/or organized women's suffrage organizations in South Africa (Cape Town, Johannesburg, Durban, Pretoria and a Kaffir kraal in Maritzburg); up the east coast of Africa to Zanzibar, Tanzania and Port Said; Egypt; then on to Jericho, Jordan, Riyaq and Beirut, Lebanon, and to Cairo, where she departed for Ceylon; then India, starting in Agra and leaving the continent in Rangoon, Myanmar (Burma). From there, it was on to Java, Sumatra, Jakarta, Indonesia, the island of Sulawesi and the Philippines. One of the last countries on Catt's travels was China, where she visited Hong Kong, Shanghai, Peking, Nanking, and Hankow. She then traveled to Korea, Japan, Hawaii, and across the Pacific back to San Francisco.

Due to the outbreak of World War I, 1913 would be the last meeting of the IWSA for some years. Three days after the armistice ending the war in 1918, Catt planned to resume the meetings of the IWSA. The 1920 meeting took place in Geneva and more than 400 women met, including delegates from Germany, France, Japan, China, India and the United States. The board asked women of the enfranchised countries to help further the vote in countries without the vote. The United States was to organize efforts in Jamaica, Cuba and South America, which was the only continent where no women had the vote. A member of the League of Woman Voters suggested that a Pan-American conference be held in 1922. After three days of round-table discussions, Catt had organized the Pan-American Association for the Advancement of Women (National Liga para la Emancipacion de la Mujer). Its objectives included educational opportunities for women, the right to have equal guardianship with husbands of their children and the right to vote.

The following year, Catt traveled to Brazil, Argentina, Uruguay, Chile, Peru and Panama. She concluded, "I never did a piece of work which has so interested and stimulated my desires to help as this." While visiting Peru in March 1923, Catt founded the National Council of Women in Action, which lobbied for women's suffrage in Peru until they succeeded in 1956. Although Catt retired from the presidency of the IWSA in 1923, she continued to attend its meetings in various parts of the world.

== Catt and the League of Women Voters ==
Catt founded the League of Women Voters on February 14, 1920 – six months before the ratification of the 19th Amendment – during the annual convention of the National American Woman Suffrage Association in Chicago, Illinois. However, she had outlined the purpose and goals of such an organization a year earlier at the 1919 NAWSA meeting in St. Louis, Missouri.

In her presidential address on March 24, 1919, at the NAWSA convention, Catt said: "Let us raise up a League of Women Voters – the name and form of organization to be determined by the voters themselves; a League that shall be non-partisan and non-sectarian in character and that shall be consecrated to three chief aims:

1. To use its utmost influence to secure the final enfranchisement of the women of every state in our own Republic and to reach out across the seas in aid of the women's struggle for her own in every land.
2. To remove the remaining legal discriminations against women in the codes and constitutions of the several states in order that the feet of coming women may find these stumbling blocks removed.
3. To make our democracy so safe for the Nation and so safe for the world, that every citizen may feel secure and great men will acknowledge the worthiness of the American Republic to lead."

In fall 1919, Catt promoted ratification of the 19th Amendment – which had been passed by Congress earlier that year – by the states and explained the purpose of the League of Women Voters on a "Wake Up America" tour. Wearing her refurbished "ratification dress," Catt spoke at 14 conferences in 13 western and Midwestern states in eight weeks. Her group also met with women and visited state capitals to see governors and other important state officials. By the time of NAWSA's "victory convention," which met February 12–18, 1920, in Chicago, 31 of the required 36 states had ratified the 19th Amendment. The 1920 convention marked the completion of NAWSA's work, except for a small board to make final disposition of records and assets, and the beginning of the League of Women Voters.

During the 1920 convention, Catt honored pioneers of the movement – including past NAWSA presidents Anna Howard Shaw and Susan B. Anthony – for their "ever buoyant hope" and "unswerving courage and determination." She also wanted the convention to "express the joy of the present" and "ask what political parties wanted of women and they of the parties." In an inspirational speech to the 700 members present, Catt outlined the plan and purpose of the League. She emphasized that its objective was not to seek power in organization, but to "foster education in citizenship and to support legislation." Every woman was encouraged to become a registered voter and work within the party of her choice. However, she emphasized that "as an organization," the League "shall be allied with and support no party." Catt continued that the League "must be nonpartisan and all partisan" in leading the way – ahead of the political parties – to educate for citizenship and get legislation passed."

At the 1920 convention, the League's constitution with details for membership, officers, representation and budget was approved. According to Van Voris, "Catt insisted she did not want to lead the new work, that was for younger and fresher women. ‘For thirty years and a little more, I have worked with you in the first lap of this struggle toward women's emancipation,' she said." Maud Wood Parks was elected president of the League of Women Voters with Catt accepting the title of "honorary chairman." Convention delegates also surprised Catt with a brooch consisting of a large sapphire surrounded by diamonds for her "distinguished service." National's parting gift to Catt was funded by thousands of individual contributions – including dimes, nickels and even pennies – from public subscription. Even schoolchildren contributed to the gift.

In addition to the national League, women's suffrage organizations in the states also reorganized as state leagues of women voters in 1920. In 2020, the League of Women Voters comprises a national organization and more than 700 state and local leagues in all 50 states, the District of Columbia, the Virgin Islands and Hong Kong. According to its website, Leagues "work year-round to register new voters, host community forums and debates, and provide voters with election information they need. We engage at the local and state levels on legislative priorities and efforts to improve our elections."

== Role during the world wars ==
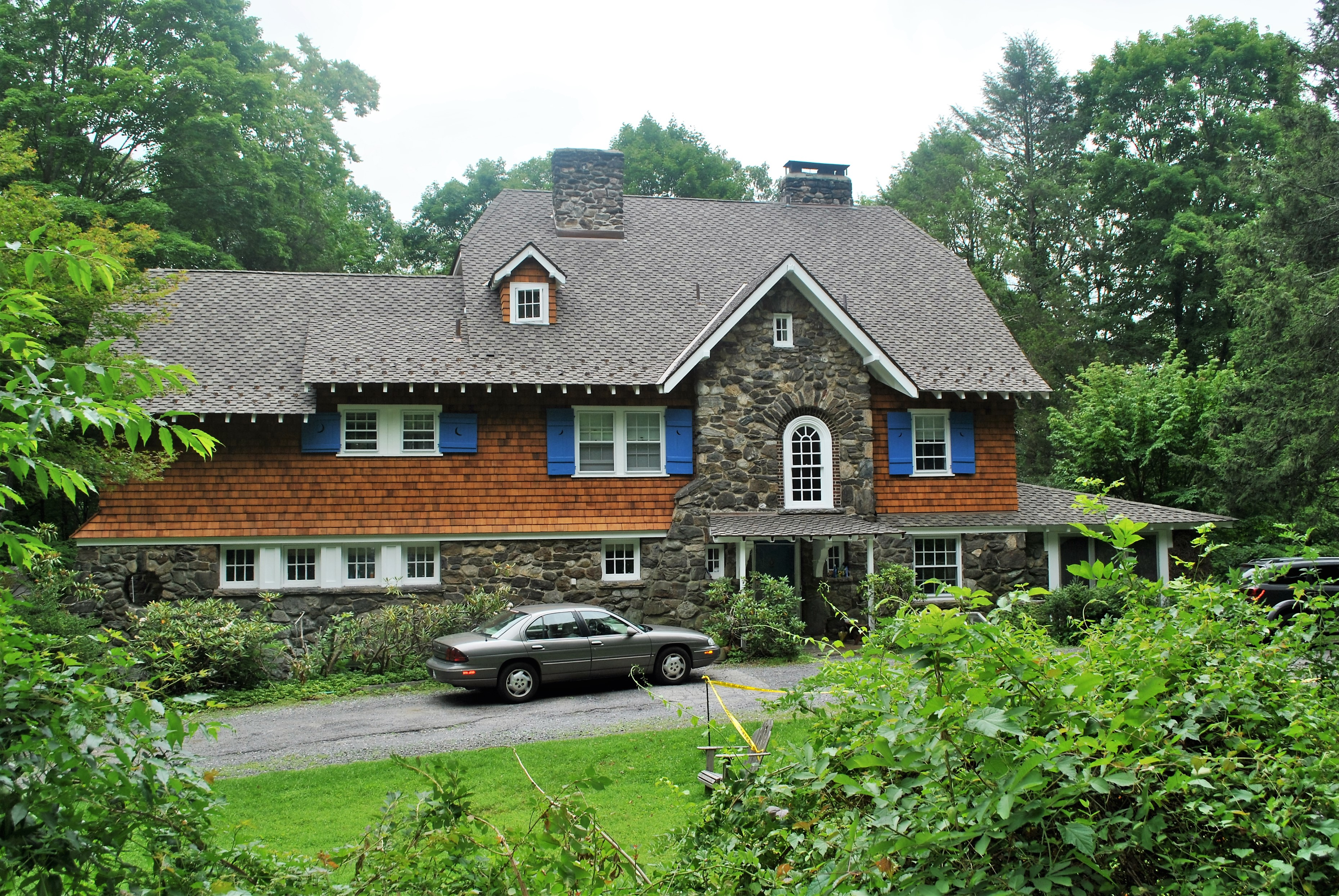
Juniper Ledge

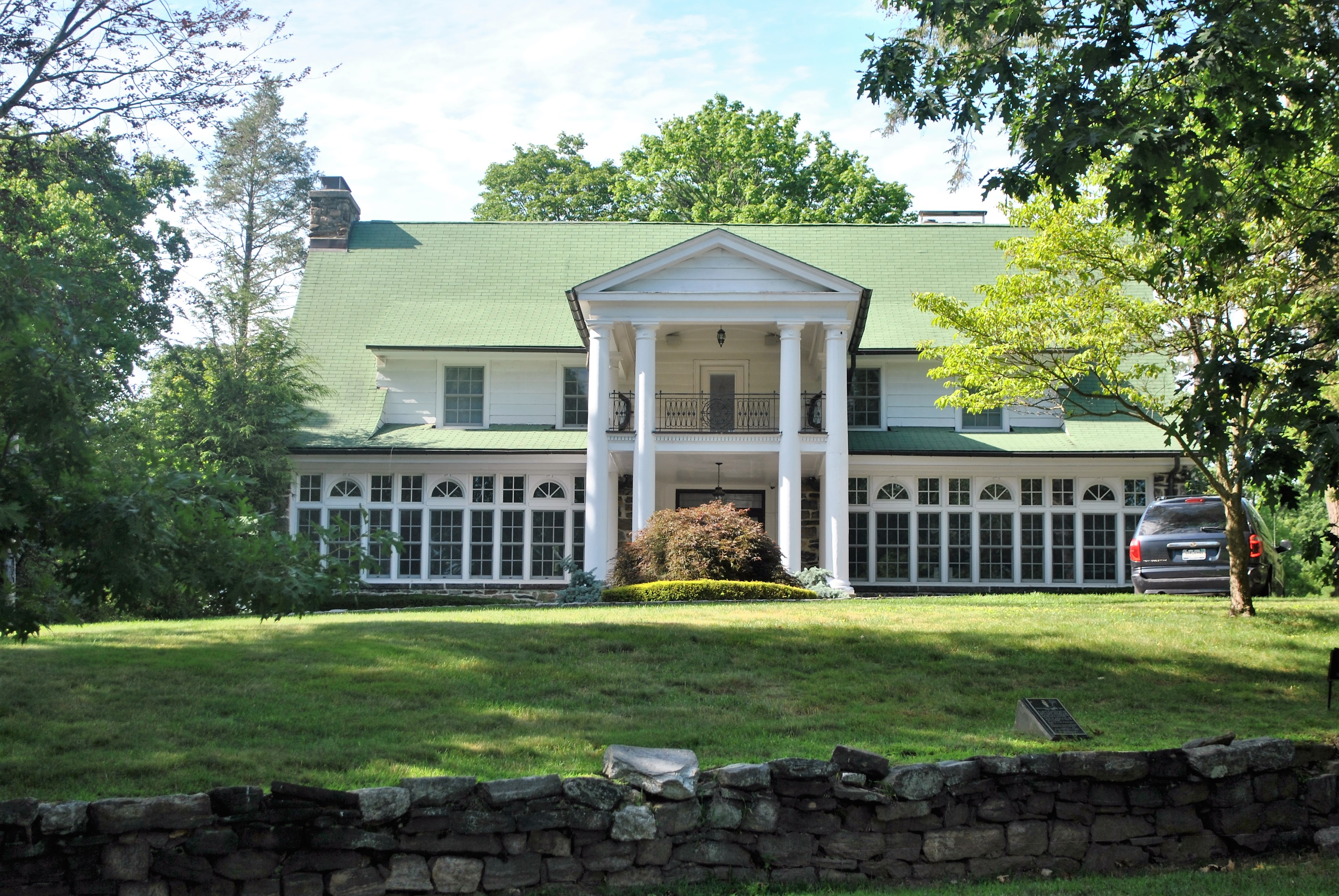
Catt's home in Paine Heights section of New Rochelle

Catt was active in anti-war causes during the 1920s and 1930s. Upon the outbreak of World War I in 1915, a group of women pacifists in the United States began talking about the need to form an organization to help bring the conflict to an end. On January 10, 1915, more than 3,000 women attended a meeting at the Willard Hotel in Washington, D.C., called by Catt and fellow suffragist Jane Addams. They formed the Women's Peace Party, with Addams elected as chairman and Catt as honorary chairman.

On February 25, 1917, by a vote of 63 to 18, NAWSA – with Catt as its president – offered the women's services to the government of the United States "in the event they should be needed, and in so far as we are authorized, we pledge the loyal support of our more than two million members." NAWSA made clear that its work for suffrage would continue since it was "the protective of all other rights." On April 2, 1917, President Wilson went before Congress to request a declaration of war. The position paper from NAWSA with Catt as its president led to her ejection from the Woman's Peace Party as well as hard feelings between her and its small cohort of pacifists.

After the Nineteenth Amendment was ratified, granting women in the United States the right to vote, Catt returned to the peace movement. Because she did not want to join any existing organization, Catt and representatives of nine national women's organizations founded their own organization, the National Committee on the Cause and Cure of War (NCCCW). The group first met in spring 1924 and chose Catt to be its leader. The group divided the causes of war into four categories: psychological, economic, political, and social and contributory. They did not include the exclusion of women from politics and the public sphere as a cause, even though they believed in equality for women. The organization believed that it was their job as women to end wars because women were seen as morally courageous, in contrast to their male counterparts who were viewed as physically courageous.

The NCCCW held its first conference in Washington, D.C., in January 1925, with 450 delegates in attendance. Eleanor Roosevelt attended as a delegate from the General Federation of Women's Clubs. Catt told the delegates, "Sooner or later the white races must disgorge some of their spoils and give a place to the other races of the world. We stole land – whole continents; we stole it at the point of swords and guns; and we might as well understand that we must not have an acre to a man while they have an inch to a man. We must leave the door open to whatever arrangements we may make for peace in order that justice can be done to all the races on all the continents."

In 1932, Catt resigned as chair of the NCCCW, but kept attending meetings, making speeches and supporting the cause of peace. However, she recognized that another war would soon engulf the world. By 1941, when it was clear that the United States would soon enter the war, the NCCCW fell apart. Five of the member organizations had withdrawn and the biennial conference was cancelled for lack of funds. In spring 1943, the NCCCW was dissolved. It was succeeded by the Women's Action Committee for Victory and Lasting Peace, which was dedicated to giving support to the idea of the United Nations. According to Jacqueline Van Voris, Catt missed only one NCCCW meeting in its entire existence.

In 1933, in response to Adolf Hitler's rise to power, Catt organized the Protest Committee of Non-Jewish Women Against the Persecution of Jews in Germany. The group sent a letter of protest to Hitler in August 1933 signed by 9,000 non-Jewish American women. It decried acts of violence and restrictive laws against German Jews. Catt pressured the U.S. government to ease immigration laws so that Jews could more easily take refuge in America. For her efforts, she became the first woman to receive the American Hebrew Medal. In 1938, Catt was a charter member of the Provisional Council Against Anti-Semitism, to protest acts of anti-Semitism in the United States in light of the persecution of Jews in Germany.

Women's advocates abroad were aware of her reputation – in 1938 she was asked to sign an affidavit in support of leading Hungarian feminists Eugénia Meller and Sarolta Steinberger's request to emigrate to the U.S. Catt had donated money to a fund that supported the Hungarian Feminist Association financially. She declined the affidavit request, noting that was she was old, had taken much responsibility on behalf of friends and associates, and the affidavit would be held against her estate after her death.

The last event she helped organize was the Women's Centennial Congress in New York in 1940, a celebration of the feminist movement in the United States.

== Catt and race ==
=== Nativism and anti-immigration ===
Catt's views on race and immigration evolved over her long life. Early in her career, she espoused nativist sentiments. According to Jacqueline Van Voris, Catt began her public life in the 1880s with three speeches, "Zenobia", "America for Americans", and "The American Sovereign". The latter two echoed anti-immigrant sentiments popular at the time.

In the 1890s, when she was active in NAWSA but before becoming president, Catt made public speeches that referred to the "ignorant foreign vote," and pointed to Native American men's lack of knowledge of representative government. Later, Catt noted that the votes of illiterate men in the South were "purchasable".

In the same speeches, Catt blamed, variously, political corruption, a lack of education, or the tragic vestiges of slavery for these groups' shortcomings as voters. Her solutions were education and reform, not disenfranchisement. Even as she decried the "ignorant foreign vote", Catt refers to the "citizens of foreign birth who desire good government", whose "life and property" are threatened by political machines.

According to Van Voris, "With a century of hindsight it is easy to see Carrie Chapman's views in the late 1880s as xenophobic oversimplifications that scapegoat immigrants. Nevertheless, both 'America' lectures proved popular and were well received by audiences that included dedicated feminists. In part the attraction to these ideas came from the women's frustration with the laws that denied them the vote while offering it to immigrant men. Catt's dream was of a sober, educated electorate of women and men. Her suspicion of the alien began to dissolve only when she entered international waters a decade later; her dream did not change."

=== Interracial marriage ===
During the final weeks of the battle for ratification of women's suffrage in Tennessee, Catt was spuriously accused by suffrage opponents of supporting interracial marriage, which was illegal in Tennessee, as well as 30 of the 48 states at the time. After she denied making such a statement, Catt said that interracial marriage was "an absolute crime against nature." According to Elaine Weiss, author of the 2018 book The Woman's Hour: The Great Fight to Win the Vote,

Catt was right that mixed-marriage was a toxic topic and woman suffrage could not afford to be in any way associated with it. She'd never said anything about marriage between the races; the allegation was a calculated lie, manufactured by the Antis and mouthed by their man [Herschel] Candler, but it could still be dangerous. She could not afford it to stand. ... When pressed for the source of his allegations about Catt's views on interracial marriage, Candler had to admit he stretched the truth a bit, connected dots in a most haphazard way. He said he'd based his claim on a published interview with Catt in which she was quoted as saying, "Suffrage knows no bias of race, color or sex."

Similarly, Catt repeated an argument developed in 1867 by abolitionist and suffragist Henry B. Blackwell, when Catt was eight years old, to refute claims by Southern suffrage opponents that women's suffrage would undermine white supremacy. Catt expressed this argument most fully in 1917. In her book chapter "Objections to the Federal Amendment." Catt wrote, "white supremacy will be strengthened, not weakened by women's suffrage," and used 1910 Census data to argue that white voters (men and women) will outnumber black voters (men and women) in all Southern states other than Mississippi and South Carolina. Catt, however, goes on to state that this argument, along with other objections to the federal amendment, are "ridiculous" and states that "all people must be included."

=== Evolving views on race ===
In September 1917, the NAWSA Executive Board, under Catt's leadership, passed a resolution "of some importance," which stated, "Resolved, That this board set forth its belief in and its stand for that broad type of American democracy that knows no bias on the ground of race, color, creed or sex; to the end that Americans may stand united, not as Irish-Americans, German-Americans, Negro-Americans, Slav-Americans, and 'the women,' but one and all as Americans for America. In November 1917, Catt called for suffrage for all women in the NAACP's newsletter, The Crisis, stating "the struggle for woman suffrage is not white woman's struggle but every woman's struggle. ... Everybody counts in applying democracy. And there will never be a true democracy until every responsible and law-abiding adult in it, without regard to race, sex, color or creed has his or her own inalienable and unpurchasable voice in the government. That is the democratic goal toward which the world is striving today."

As NAWSA President, Catt opposed diluting the 19th Amendment by adding the word "white" or by espousing the alternative Shafroth–Palmer Amendment, which would have allowed states the autonomy to draft suffrage legislation as they saw fit. Similarly, in separate letters written in May 1919, Catt assured the National Association for the Advancement of Colored People (NAACP) and two African American suffragists from Kentucky" that NAWSA opposed any effort to limit the vote to white women only.

In her later years, Catt repudiated her earlier nativist statements, calling herself "a regular jingoist". In her 1909 address to ISWA, Catt stated, "...our task will not be fulfilled until the women of the whole world have been rescued from those discriminations and injustices which in every land are visited upon them in law and custom." In 1918, when Catt was president, NAWSA lobbied Congress to amend the Hawaii Organic Act to allow the territory to enfranchise women, including Native Hawaiian women. In 1924, Catt condemned the Ku Klux Klan for their racism, antisemitism, and anti-Catholicism.

=== Collaboration with African American suffragists ===
Moreover, NAWSA and its predecessors were integrated organizations and African American suffragists were key allies in Catt's campaign to secure the vote in New York. Moreover, Catt's Woman Suffrage Party, the leading pro-suffrage organization in the New York, actively sought immigrant support by publishing pro-suffrage literature in 26 languages; hosting rallies in Irish, Syrian, Italian, and Polish enclaves; and establishing committees to reach out to German and French communities. Similarly, in 1919, Catt supported the "Committee on One Hundred" in New York City, which called upon Congress to enforce the 15th Amendment. In the same year, at the founding of the League of Women Voters, Catt called upon the new organization to "remove the remaining legal discriminations against women in the codes and constitutions of the several states in order that the feet of coming women may find these stumbling blocks removed."

In 1920, the Miami Herald reported on a meeting by the "Woman Voter's League", where Miss Jefferson Bell who, the Herald reported, "stated that she, too, had been a worshipper at the shrine of Mrs. Catt until shortly after the ratification when one of her first acts was to appeal to the southern women to assist in seeing that negro women had the right to exercise the franchise." Similarly, Josephine A. Pearson, the leader of the anti-suffrage lobby during the Tennessee debate, condemned Catt after Tennessee ratified the 19th Amendment, "...I am not sure that this new party spells more serious menace to civilization than the picture, recently, of the great international suffrage leader, Mrs. Catt, marching through the streets of New York, with a negro woman on either side of her! Was she thus proclaiming her ideal of the supremacy of the negro-race that threatens the South, if Federal Suffrage should ever come to us?"

Catt became more outspoken in her opposition to discrimination in the 1920s–1940s, when she was active in the peace movement. For instance, Catt defended Black troops against false charges that they were raping German women during World War I. She also protested a Washington, D.C. hotel's policy of excluding African Americans, which precluded them from participating in a NCCCW conference, and spoke out about the plight of Jewish refugees escaping Nazi Germany in the 1930s.

== Death and legacy ==
On March 9, 1947, Catt died of a heart attack in her home in New Rochelle, New York. She was buried at Woodlawn Cemetery in The Bronx, New York City. alongside her longtime companion, Mary Garrett Hay, a fellow New York state suffragist, with whom she lived for more than 20 years.

African American suffragist Mary Church Terrell memorialized Catt in a telegram: "The whole world has lost a great, good, and gifted woman who, for many years, pleaded with it to deal justly with all human beings without regard to sex, race, or religion. Personally, I have lost a dear friend who for forty years has encouraged me by writing and speaking both publicly and privately." At her funeral, the Reverend Walter Van Kirk praised "the dignity and prestige with which she invested the womanhood of American and of every land."

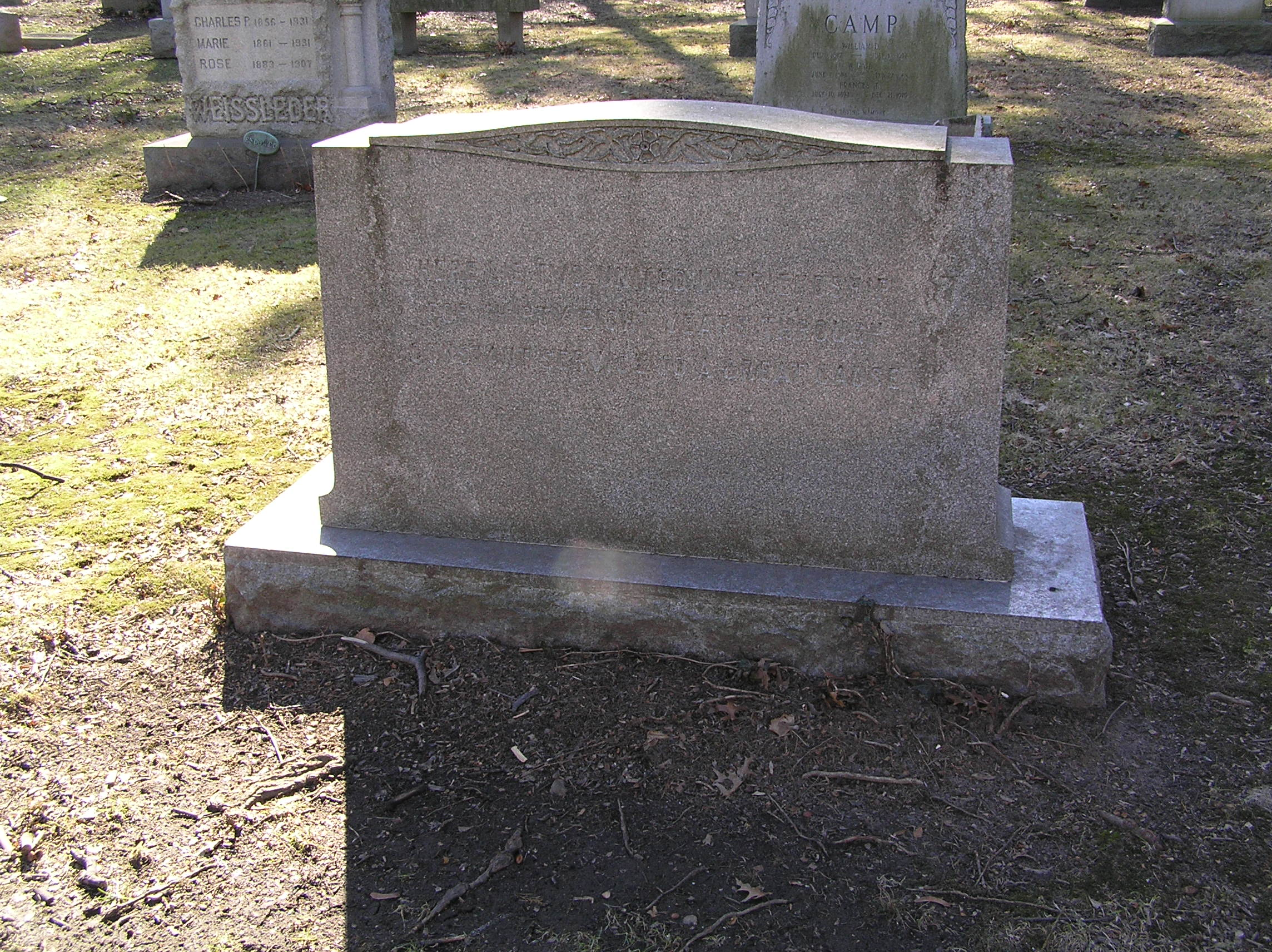
Carrie Chapman Catt grave in Woodlawn Cemetery

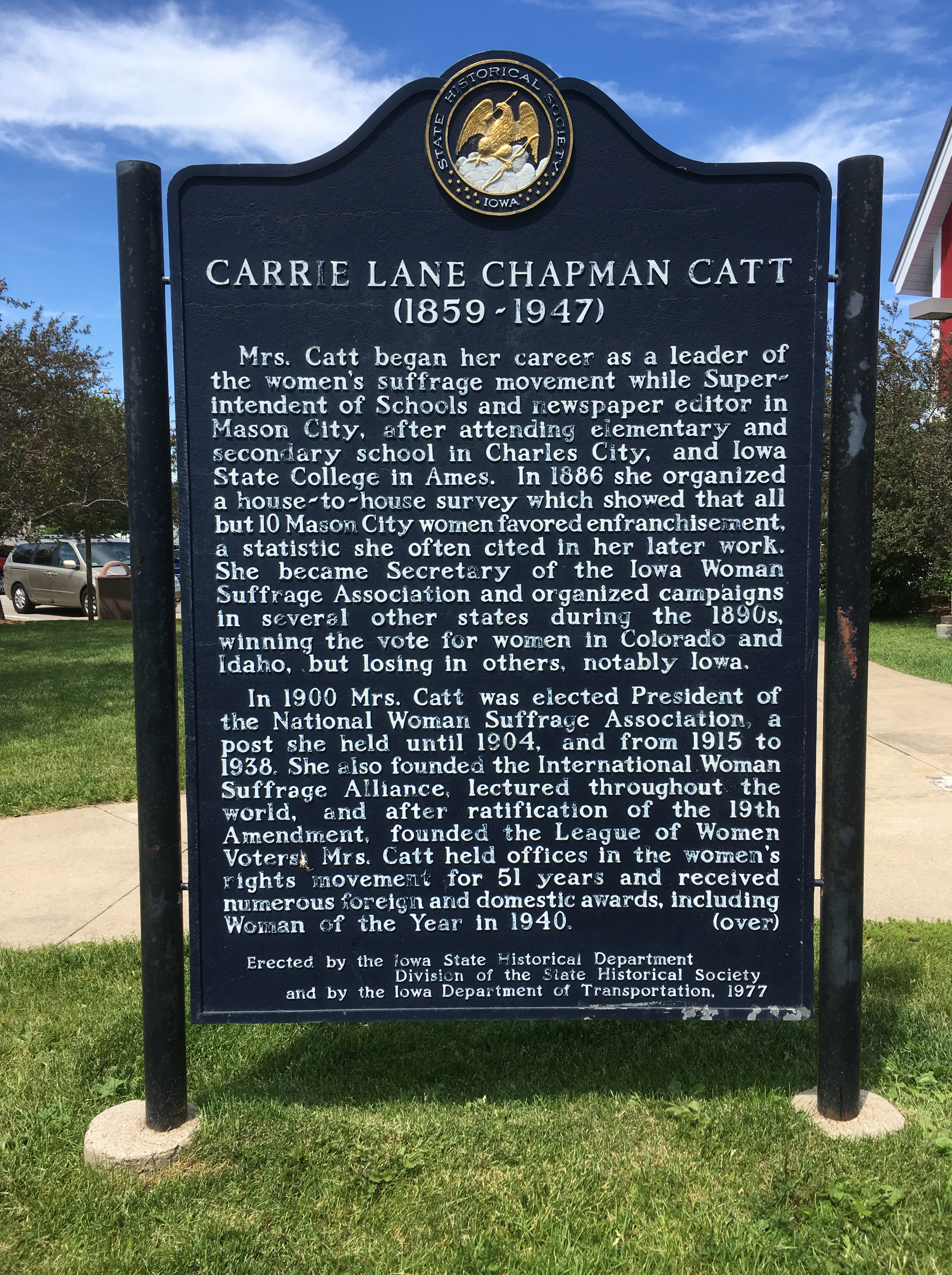
Historical marker for Carrie Lane Chapman Catt, Iowa Welcome Center

=== Honors ===
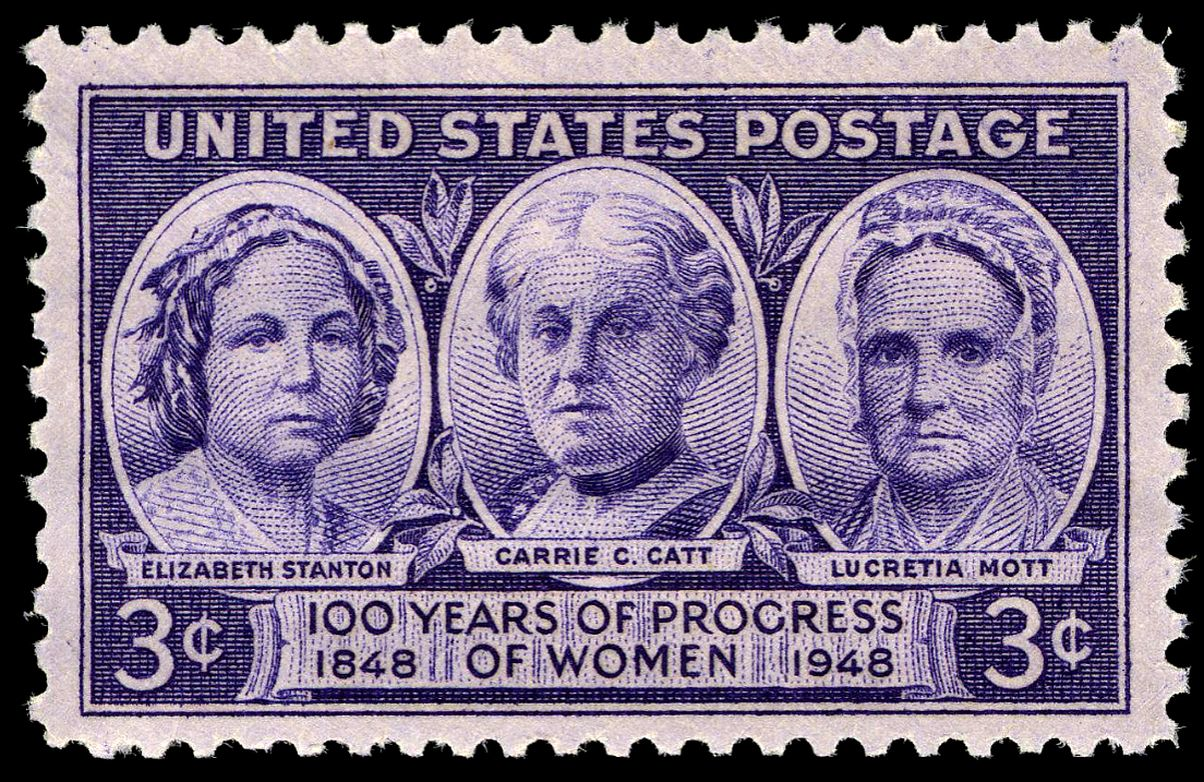
U.S.commemorative stamp of 1948, Seneca Falls Convention titled 100 Years of Progress of Women: 1848–1948. From left to right, Elizabeth Cady Stanton, Carrie Chapman Catt, Lucretia Mott.

Catt attained recognition for her work both during and after her lifetime. In 1921, Catt became the first woman to receive an honorary doctorate from the University of Wyoming. In 1923, Catt was named one of the "12 Greatest Living American Women" by the League of Women Voters and in 1925, she received an honorary doctor of laws degree from Smith College. In 1926, she was featured on the cover of Time magazine and, in 1930, she received the Pictorial Review Award for her international disarmament work. In 1933, Catt received the American Hebrew Medal; in 1935, the Turkish government issued a stamp to honor her work, and in 1936, she was honored by President Franklin Roosevelt at the White House for her peace activism. In 1940, Catt received an honorary doctor of laws degree from Moravian College for Women, the American Women's Association's "Woman of the Year Award, and the Gold Medal Pioneer Award from the General Federation of Women's Clubs. In 1941, Catt received the Chi Omega award at the White House from her longtime friend Eleanor Roosevelt.

Catt's posthumous awards include a stamp that was issued in 1948 in remembrance of the Seneca Falls Convention, featuring Catt, Elizabeth Cady Stanton, and Lucretia Mott. In 1975, Catt became the first inductee into the Iowa Women's Hall of Fame. and in 1982, Catt was inducted into the National Women's Hall of Fame. In 1992, the Iowa Centennial Memorial Foundation presented her with The Iowa Award, the state's highest honor, and named her one of the ten most important women of the century, and in 2013, Catt was in the first class of women to be honored on the Women of Achievement Bridge in Des Moines, Iowa.

The League of Women Voters often honors Catt as its founder. In 1929, the League placed bronze tablets honoring her contributions to suffrage throughout the country. In 1947, the national League established the Carrie Chapman Catt Memorial Fund, which promoted suffrage aboard, voter education, and the responsibilities of citizenship. In the 1959, this fund was used to sponsor a "Government in Action" program at Syracuse University. A number of Leagues around the country present awards named for their founder. These include:

- The Ames/Story County (Iowa) League has bestowed its Carrie Chapman Catt Award, which recognizes a member's contribution to the community, since 1993.
- The League of Women Voters of Iowa also bestows a Carrie Chapman Catt Award annually, recognizing the significant accomplishments of one of its members.
- Since 1997, the League of Women Voters of Saratoga County (New York) has recognized a member each year with their Carrie Chapman Catt Award for outstanding and long-standing service to the League.
- The League of Women Voters of Dane County, which includes Catt's birthplace of Ripon, Wisconsin, instituted its Carrie Chapman Catt Award in 2005
- The League of Women Voters of Lake Forest/Lake Bluff (Illinois) has presented its Carrie Chapman Catt Award since 2013.

In 1992, the Charles City, Iowa school district named its alternative high school "Carrie Lane High School" in honor of Catt. In 2019, Iowa Secretary of State Paul Pate announced the Carrie Chapman Catt Award, which it awards to every Iowa high school that registers to vote at least 90 percent of its eligible student body. Finally, Catt was posthumously named a "Valiant Woman of the Vote" by the National Women's History Alliance in 2020.

Museum, Monuments, and Historical Markers

Catt's childhood home in Charles City, Iowa has been restored, listed on the National Register of Historic Places, and is now a museum dedicated to her life and legacy as well as the history of the women's suffrage movement. It is managed by the nonprofit organization, the National Nineteenth Amendment Society. In 2020 it was added as a site on the National Women's Suffrage Trail. The marker was dedicated in 2021.

On August 26, 2016 (Women's Equality Day), a monument commissioned by Tennessee Suffrage Monument, Inc. and sculpted by Alan LeQuire was unveiled in Centennial Park in Nashville, featuring depictions of Catt, Anne Dallas Dudley, Abby Crawford Milton, Juno Frankie Pierce, and Sue Shelton White. Catt is one of three suffragists memorialized with a statue at the Turning Point Suffrage Memorial in Lorton, Virginia, which was dedicated on May 16, 2021.

Catt is also honored in the following historical markers:

- Charlestown, IN: Marker to honor Mary Garrett Hay, which mentions also mentions Catt, dedicated in October 2021.
- Flint, Michigan's Sitdowners Memorial Park: Plaque dedicated to Catt.
- Huntsville, AL: Mentioned on a marker memorializing suffragist Alberta Chapman Taylor.
- Iowa Welcome Center on Interstate 35: Historical marker erected by the Iowa Department of Transportation and the Iowa State Historical Society, dedicated in 1977.
- Louisville, KY: Marker at the First Unitarian Church, which mentions that Carrie Chapman Catt and Susan B. Anthony spoke there on their 1895 Southern Tour.
- Memphis, TN: Markers memorializing suffragist Lide Smith Meriwether, which mentions that she traveled with Catt and Anthony; suffragist Mary Church Terrell, founder of the National Association of Colored Women; and Joseph Hanover, one of Catt's allies on the Tennessee state legislature in 1920. All three were erected by the Memphis Suffrage Monument Committee in 2022.
- New Rochelle, NY: The New Rochelle Historical Society and the League of Women Voters of New Rochelle placed a marker on the street where she lived.
- Ripon, WI: Catt's birthplace, erected by the Wisconsin Historical Society in 1977.

=== Women's voting rights ===
As President of the nation's largest women's suffrage organization when the 19th Amendment was ratified, women's voting rights are part of Catt's legacy. The 19th Amendment enfranchised approximately 27 million American women. The amendment extended to women of all races who were not disenfranchised for other reasons. It remains the largest single extension of suffrage in American history. This included three million African American women of voting age, approximately 500,000 of whom lived in the 34 states outside the Deep South. By 1960, the last Census before the Voting Rights Act was passed, more than two million African American women in these 34 states were enfranchised.

In addition, some African American women living in the South were able to register and vote in 1920. According to historian Roslyn Terborg-Penn, "...Black female participation in the elective process during 1920 was extensive enough to occasion a prediction from Georgia State Representative Thomas M. Bell that the Nineteenth Amendment would destroy white supremacy in Georgia since the amendment had enfranchised enough women." In South Carolina, African American women "apparently took the white male registrars by surprise, and no plan to disqualify them was in effect. Many Black women reported to the registrar's office, but the only discrimination was that whites were registered first."

The 19th Amendment did not prohibit other forms of discrimination against women voters. For instance, no women were allowed to vote in Georgia or Mississippi in 1920 because state legislatures were not called into special session to pass the enabling legislation. Similarly, by the end of the decade, African American women in the South were again disenfranchised by discriminatory laws and practices. Puerto Rican women were not fully enfranchised until 1935. Likewise, Native American women who did not renounce their tribal citizenship were not eligible to vote in 1920 and Chinese American women were not eligible to vote because of the Chinese Exclusion Act, which kept Chinese Americans from becoming citizens. This law was in place until 1943. Finally, women of color, especially African American women, continued to experience discrimination until the 24th Amendment, which prohibited poll taxes, and Voting Rights Act were enacted in 1964 and 1965, respectively.

Women's voter turnout was approximately 38 percent in 1920, compared to over 65 percent for men. Women's voter turnout rates lagged behind men's, but gradually rose over time. Women became the numerical majority of voters in 1968 and began to vote at higher rates than men in 1980. By 2016, women's voter turnout was 63 percent compared to 53 percent for men, a difference of 10 million voters. Also starting in 1980, men and women's vote choices began to diverge, with women being more likely to vote for Democratic candidates and to express support for the Democratic Party. This gender gap is now a durable fixture in American politics, present at the presidential level and in many down ballot races. The largest gender gap was in 2020 with a 12 percentage point advantage to the Democratic nominee, Joe Biden. The smallest was four percentage points in 1992, when the Democratic nominee Bill Clinton faced President George H. W. Bush (R) and Independent Ross Perot.

=== At Iowa State University ===
In 1921, Catt became the first woman to deliver a commencement address at Iowa State University when she also received an honorary doctor of laws degree. She was invited to speak again in 1930 and in 1933, received the Iowa State Alumni Association Merit Award for Distinguished Service.

When George Catt died in 1905, he left a donation to Iowa State in his will. However, New York state attorneys determined that the donation was not permissible, since under New York law, bequests could only be awarded to an individual or an incorporated entity. Iowa State, at the time, did not qualify. Consequently, Catt signed over $100,000 in bonds ($3.58 million in 2025 dollars) to the university to honor George Catt's wishes. The George W. Catt Endowment continues to award scholarships to several students in different fields of study each year. Selection is based on academic achievement and financial need. A few years after her husband's death, Catt donated another $22,500 to Iowa State and in 1926, donated $6,000 to her sorority, Pi Beta Phi, equivalent to $109,000 in 2025 dollars. She also left her personal library of over 1,000 volumes, many on the subject of peace, to the university, along with some furniture and other personal belongings.

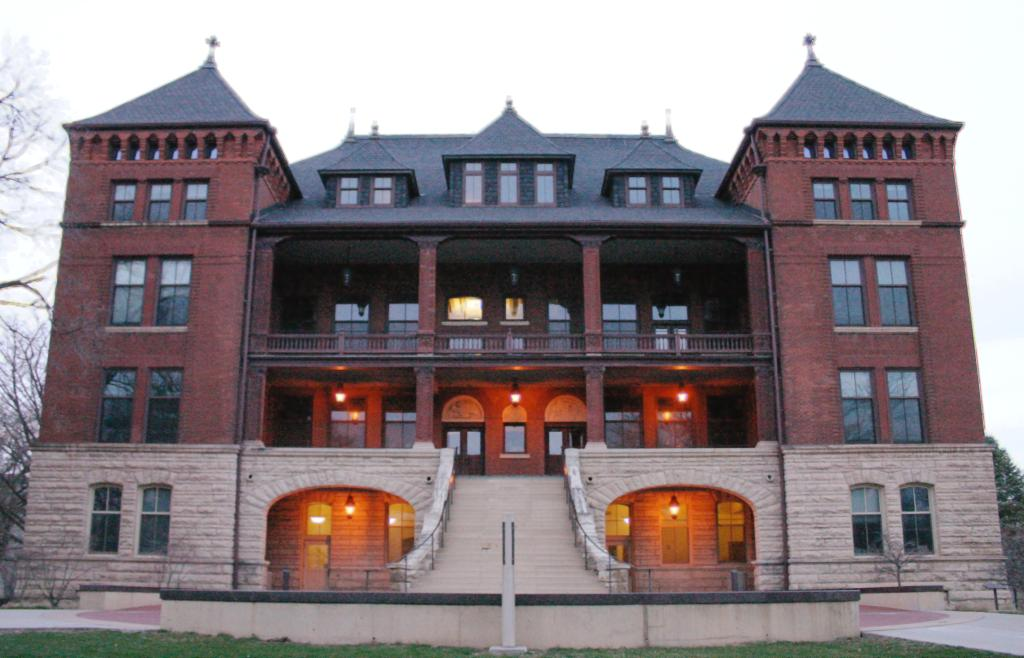
Carrie Chapman Catt Hall at Iowa State University from the south

Iowa State University named a street, Carrie Lane Court, in Catt's honor. As early as 1974, the Government of the Student Body passed a resolution requesting that the new physical education building be named for Catt. The naming committee chair opposed the idea, stating he did not want a "Catt House" on campus. In 1990, the university announced that it was renaming the Old Botany Building as Carrie Chapman Catt Hall and the building was dedicated in 1995 after a $5 million renovation. Naming the building after Catt engendered controversy, with some in the university community objecting to the naming because they said Catt was a racist. In March 2021, the university announced the formation of the Committee on the Consideration of Removing Names from University Property that was considering the renaming of Carrie Chapman Catt Hall. On August 31, 2023, the Committee issued its draft report and initial vote. The committee initially recommended retaining the name of the building. After a sixty-day public comment period, university president Wendy Wintersteen formally accepted the recommendation that the name of Carrie Chapman Catt Hall not be changed.

In 1992, Iowa State University established the Carrie Chapman Catt Center for Women and Politics. The Catt Center conducts research on women in politics, with a special emphasis on Iowa, and promotes civic engagement on campus and in the community. The Catt Center instituted its Carrie Chapman Catt Prize for Research on Women and Politics in 1995 and in 2006 the College of Liberal Arts and Sciences added the Carrie Chapman Catt Public Engagement Award to its roster of alumni awards.

=== Nineteenth Amendment centennial ===
2020 marked the 100th anniversary of the League of Women Voters and the Nineteenth Amendment to the U.S. Constitution. The League – which includes the national organization founded by Catt on February 14, 1920, as well as more than 700 state and local leagues throughout the United States – is a respected, nonpartisan political organization that continues to educate citizens on key issues of the day and advocates for expansion of access to the ballot for all U.S. citizens.

As part of the centennial celebration of the Nineteenth Amendment in 2020, Catt was featured in newspaper and magazine articles; recent books, such as Elaine Weiss's The Woman's Hour: The Great Fight to Win the Vote (2018), which is being made into a film with Hillary Rodham Clinton as the executive producer; the PBS American Experience two-part documentary The Vote; and the Iowa PBS documentary, Carrie Chapman Catt: Warrior for Women.

== Personal life ==
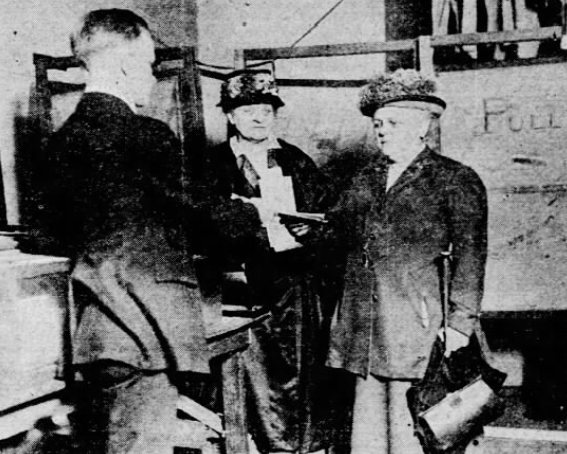
Carrie Chapman Catt and Mary Garrett Hay receive ballots to cast their first votes for president in 1920.

In March 1883, the month Carrie Lane was promoted to superintendent of schools in Mason City, Iowa, Leo Chapman purchased and began to publish the weekly Mason City Republican newspaper. A supporter of women's suffrage, he and Lane became engaged and were married at the Lane family home on February 12, 1885. The two began publishing the weekly newspaper as co-editors. In May 1886, having sold the newspaper due to a libel suit, Leo left for San Francisco to find a job in a newspaper while Carrie stayed in Iowa and lived with her parents until he sent word that he had found work and a home for them. In August 1886, Carrie received a telegram that Leo was very ill with typhoid fever and she should come at once. By the time she reached San Francisco on the train, he was dead.

While in San Francisco, she happened to meet George Catt, who was walking behind her on a downtown street. The two had been in college together, and he was about to become the chief engineer for a San Francisco bridge-building firm. In August 1887, Chapman moved back to Iowa, but the two kept in touch. In spring 1890, Chapman took the train to Seattle, Washington, where Catt now lived. On June 10, 1890, the two were married.

Theirs was the deep love of two mature and committed people, each of whom respected the other's talents. The newly named Carrie Chapman Catt even told of the arrangement they made before they married, "We made a team to work for the cause. My husband used to say that he was as much a reformer as I, but that he couldn't work at reforming and earn a living at the same time; but what he could do was earn living enough for two and free me from all economic burden, and thus I could reform for two. That was our bargain and we happily understood each other." Both traveled extensively for their work, but also found time to travel together. On October 8, 1905, George Catt died from a perforated ulcer at the age of 45. George Catt had been a successful engineer and his estate left Catt financially independent for the rest of her life.

Catt resided at Juniper Ledge in the Westchester County, New York community of Briarcliff Manor from 1919 through 1928 when she settled in nearby New Rochelle, New York. After George Catt's death, Carrie Chapman Catt lived with Mary "Mollie" Garrett Hay, a suffragist leader from New York. Hay was not a part of the international circle of elites that Catt aligned herself with; however, it was understood that they had a special relationship. Catt requested burial alongside Hay, rather than her first husband. Her second husband's body was donated to science, according to his wishes. When Hay died in 1928, Alda Wilson moved in with Catt and remained as her secretary until Catt's death. Wilson was Catt's companion and eventual estate executor, donating six volumes of photographs and memorabilia from Catt's estate to Bryn Mawr College.

== In popular culture ==
Carrie Chapman Catt is the subject of Barbara Robison's Victory with Valor: A Novel, a fictionalized account of her life, published in 2020. Catt is also the primary subject in three children's books: Carrie Chapman Catt: A Voice for Women by Kristen Thoennes Keller, published in 2005; Carrie Chapman Catt: A Life of Leadership by Nate Levin, published in 2006; and Dare to Question: Carrie Chapman Catt's Voice for the Vote, by Jasmine A. Stirling and illustrated by Udayana Lugo, published in 2023. Catt is also a character in The Hope Chest by Karen Schwabach, published in 2010. In addition, Elaine Weiss's The Woman's Hour was adapted for young readers. This version was published in 2020.

Catt has appeared as a character within multiple theatrical projects on the subject of the women's suffrage movement. She is portrayed by Jenn Collela in the musical Suffs with book, music, and lyrics by Shaina Taub. Suffs premiered off-Broadway at The Public Theatre in March 2022 and has since begun an open-ended run on Broadway in March 2024. The musical is produced in-part by Hillary Clinton and Malala Yousafzai.

Catt is also the subject of a one-woman play, The Yellow Rose of Suffrage, by Jane Cox, professor emerita of theatre at Iowa State University. First performed in 1993 by Cox, the play was performed extensively throughout 1995, including at the Kennedy Center for the Performing Arts, and has been performed ever since in over 20 states.

Additional theatre projects include 19: The Musical, conceived and performed by Through the 4th Wall across the Washington, D.C. area in 2019, The Suffragist by Nancy Cobb and Cavan Hallman, and Crusading Mrs. Catt, a one-woman play written and performed by Lisa Hayes.

Catt was portrayed by Anjelica Huston in the film Iron Jawed Angels (2004) and is featured in the PBS documentaries One Woman, One Vote (1995) and The Vote, Part 2 (2020) and in Iowa PBS's Carrie Chapman Catt: Warrior for Women (2020), which received a regional Emmy Award. In 2021, Catt was featured in an art exhibit "Imposter Files for the Recovery of the Memory and History of Peruvian Women".

Catt herself appeared in the pro-suffrage film The Ruling Power, produced by the New York Woman Suffrage Party.

== See also ==
- International Women Suffrage Alliance
- National American Woman Suffrage Association
- League of Women Voters
- List of suffragists and suffragettes
- List of women's rights activists
- Timeline of women's suffrage
- Open Christmas Letter
- Women's suffrage organizations
- List of civil rights leaders

== Cited sources ==
- Catt, Carrie Chapman; Shuler, Nettie Rogers (2020) [1923]. Woman Suffrage and Politics: The Inner Story of the Suffrage Movement. Mineola, NY: Dover. ISBN 978-0-486-84205-9.
- Fowler, Robert Booth (1986). Carrie Catt: Feminist Politician. Boston: Northeastern University Press. ISBN 0-930350-86-3.
- Peck, Mary Gray (2011) [1944]. Carrie Chapman Catt: A Biography. New York: HW Wilson Company. ISBN 978-1-258-18321-9.
- Terborg-Penn, Rosalyn (1998). African American Women in the Struggle for the Vote, 1850–1920. Indiana University Press. ISBN 0-253-21176-X.
- Van Voris, Jacqueline (1987). Carrie Chapman Catt: A Public Life. New York: The Feminist Press, CUNY. ISBN 1-55861-139-8.
- Weiss, Elaine (2018). The Woman's Hour. New York: Penguin. ISBN 978-0-525-42972-2.
