= Julian Street Jr. residence =

Coordinates: 41.13388°N 73.84686°W

The Julian Street Jr. residence

The Julian Street Jr. residence is an early Modernist fieldstone house in Briarcliff Manor, New York. The house was designed by the New York architect Wallace K. Harrison for Julian Street Jr. and his wife, Narcissa, in 1938. Harrison, primarily known as a monuments architect through his works in New York City like Rockefeller Center and the United Nations headquarters complex, also designed a few private residences. Harrison designed and built the residence at 710 Long Hill Road West as an unconventional experiment in the early Modernist architecture that was just being introduced in America during the late 1930s.

== Background ==
During the 1930s, Wallace K. Harrison had a personal relationship with Street. As a new partner in the architectural firm Corbett, Harrison & MacMurray, Harrison was invited to join other architects to design Rockefeller Center. Harrison was good friends with Street, who worked at National Broadcasting Company (NBC) and whom Harrison knew through his own wife, Ellen. During the planning of Rockefeller Center, the Metropolitan Opera dropped out as the main tenant; Harrison then needed a new tenant, so he had lunch with his friend, where Harrison told Street that he thought it would be best "if it were NBC at Rockefeller Center broadcasting to the world". By this time, both NBC and RKO Pictures were under the control of the Radio Corporation of America (RCA). After negotiations, RCA became the largest tenant for the central skyscraper of Rockefeller Center and RKO occupied the second building.

Street and his wife Narcissa Vanderlip were from wealthy families. She was the daughter of Frank and Narcissa Cox Vanderlip, who lived at Beechwood in Briarcliff Manor; Vanderlip was the president of the National City Bank from 1909 to 1919. Narcissa Vanderlip attended the Scarborough School, graduated from Vassar College in 1925, and was a member of the Junior League; while her husband, Julian Street Jr., graduated from Princeton University in 1925 where he was the editorial chairman for The Daily Princetonian—by 1925, he was on the staff of The New York Herald Tribune. Julian Street Jr. was the son of notable author Julian Street, who wrote such works as Abroad at Home (1914), Mysterious Japan (1921), Rita Coventry (1922), and Where Paris Dines (1929). Street Jr. was working as a scriptwriter for NBC, where he adapted Booth Tarkington's Penrod for broadcasting, the first popular book to be formatted for broadcast purposes. Both Narcissa and Julian Street Jr. were the children of wealthy Gilded Age American families, and it was not surprising that they later married. Their parents were connected, as Frank Vanderlip, Narcissa's father, knew Julian Street Jr.'s father since the Bank Panic of 1907, when Frank helped Street keep his money safe with National City Bank. The Streets were married in April 1927 in a lavish ceremony at the New Church, a Georgian building on 35th Street in New York City; at their reception, held at the Colony Club, more than 1,500 guests attended, including Goulds, Vanderbilts and Roosevelts. After their marriage, Edward Walker Harden, a Briarcliff Manor estate owner and longtime friend of Frank Vanderlip, gave land on the east side of Sleepy Hollow Road in Briarcliff Manor to the Streets. The Streets, however, preferred the land that was already owned by the Vanderlips on Long Hill Road West, which was more private and secluded, so they sold the land given by Harden. According to a map from October 6, 1937, Street's mother-in-law possessed the land on which the Streets' new house, designed by Wallace K. Harrison, was constructed.

== Design and construction ==
The Street family considered Harrison a skyscraper architect, so his decision to both plan and supervise the construction of their house in Scarborough, a hamlet of the village of Briarcliff Manor, surprised them. By October 6, 1937, the house that Harrison constructed had one story of stone in the shape of an L, with a short stone wall extending from the back of the house, and a ramp path with a serpentine wall running up along the front of the house to the entrance. By March 7, 1938, the two-story house was completed. The finished house was built of local fieldstone in the shape of an L, using steel beams on the roofs of the house and garage, with sixteen-inch walls, glass porthole windows, and large panes of glass and doors on the back of the house—it was related in design to other early Modernist houses constructed in the late 1930s by the Modernists Walter Gropius and Marcel Breuer. Breuer was a proponent of the more modern International Style, and Gropius, as Director of the Bauhaus in Germany, applied the International Style when he designed the school's faculty housing and building around 1925 to 1926. Gropius and Breuer represented a new form of architectural design, one that did not look to the past, but rather to modern industry for inspiration.

Breuer and Gropius were teaching their new modern industrial architecture design in the United States around the time when the Street residence was designed and built in the late 1930s. The Bauhaus was closed by the German government in 1933, and by 1934, Walter Gropius had fled Germany since he was unsympathetic to the Nazi regime; he immigrated with his ideas to Cambridge, Massachusetts in February 1937, to teach architecture as a professor of architecture at Harvard University. There he introduced the Bauhaus philosophy of modern design to the architecture curriculum at Harvard, and his advocacy for this design philosophy was quickly popular among his students; this soon resulted in the educational changes in other architecture schools in the United States, starting the decline of "historically imitative architecture" in America. By 1937, Breuer had also moved from Germany to teach at Harvard, where he practiced with Walter Gropius from 1938 to 1941. In addition, Harrison was also in communication with Walter Gropius and would have known about his ideas concerning early Modernist architecture, as his wife Ellen organized a lunch in 1931 attended by Gropius and other architects, and Harrison remembered meeting Gropius there.

== Architecture ==
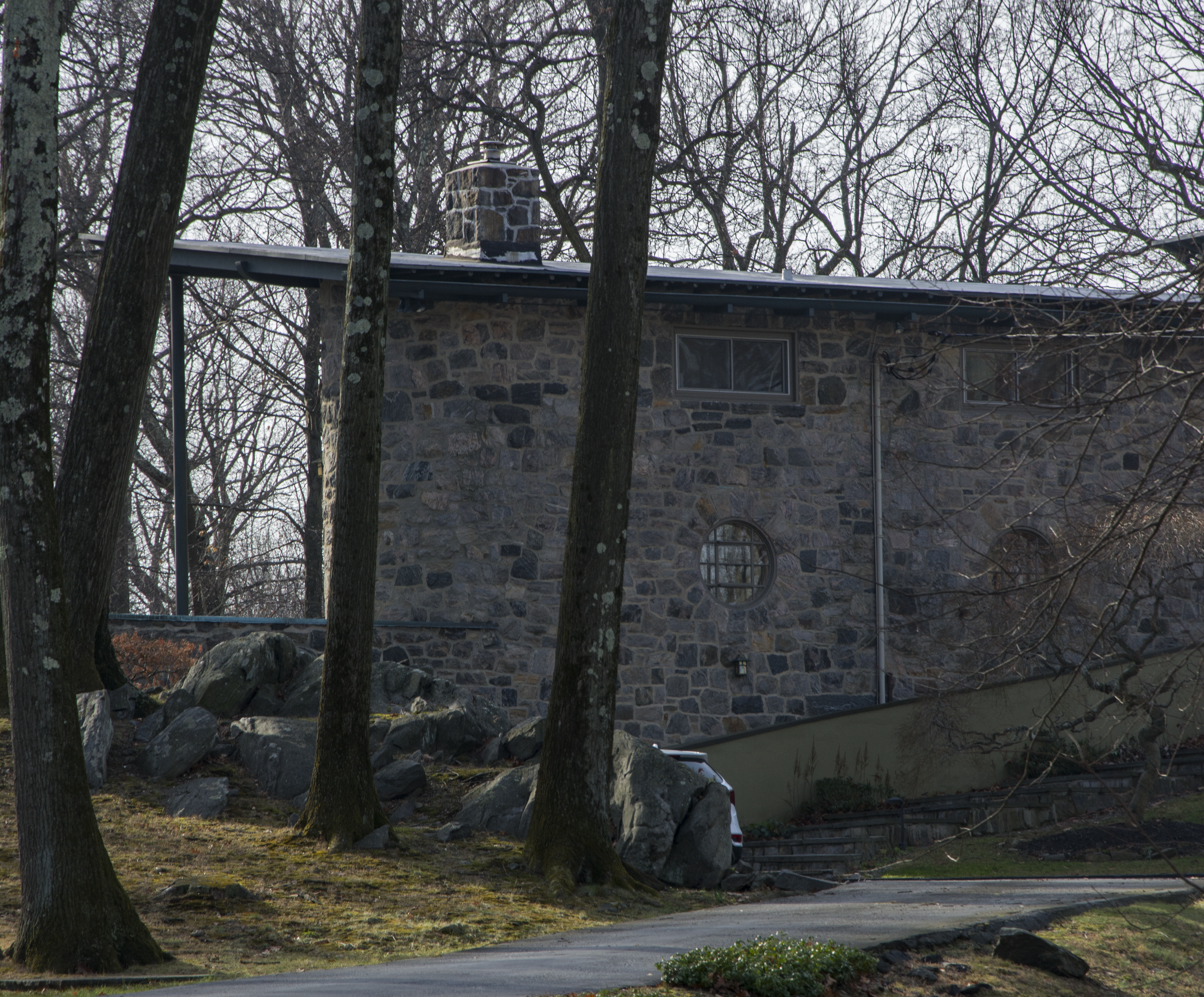
Detail of stonework and windows

Julian Street Jr. welcomed Harrison's experimentation and favored his innovative plan. When he was interviewed forty-five years later, Street still insisted that:

"building that house was one of the greatest experiences I ever had. In those days there was nothing to go by; it was a study in "how did I want to live?" After the plans were drawn up, we never changed a thing; it worked marvelously."

Circa 1940 images of the house show that Modernist elements were incorporated into Harrison's design. A photograph of the façade reveals a stone garage next to a simple white door, with a high serpentine wall snaking up the ramp path to the front door; the house's two-story façade is made of stone with porthole windows and a large rectangular stone structure to the right of the front door. It presents a very private and industrial front, with stone and glass, and a ramp path to the door, like a conveyor belt in a factory. The back view exemplifies use of the building's twelve exterior doors, many of them stone and glass, and opens up to a wider view of the back, which is more spacious with trees and in harmony with nature because of the local fieldstone that echoes the surrounding rocky landscape. There is little ornamental decoration, it is simply constructed with industrial materials in keeping with Breuer and Gropius's idea of "unit construction" or the bringing together of "standard units to create a technologically simple but functionally complex whole," and the use of new materials to create art design that reflected the age of industry. With Harrison's use of steel and glass, as well as the industrial conveyor-belt like ramp to the house's front door, Harrison used new materials to reflect the age of industry, and its simple forms of stone sections form a composite, complex stone entirety. Gropius and Breuer designed Gropius's own house in Lincoln, Massachusetts, which used both fieldstone and wood painted white, re-establishing "New England traditionalism in modern terms." With his use of fieldstone in the Street residence, Harrison was even incorporating some of the same materials as the Modernist architects of his time, Gropius and Breuer.

Inside this residence, the house originally had a very simple interior, with a large living room to the right of the front door, a simple dining room straight ahead, a long hallway to the left of the front door, a simple spiral staircase in the front hall, and a small kitchen and servants' quarters in the back (now a bigger kitchen). In the interior of the house, the forms of the rooms were simple but combined to make a more complex structure like Breuer and Gropius advocated. The house has four bedrooms and four bathrooms.

The large circular windows present throughout the house gave the Street family the impression of "living on a boat". Harrison designing this house to give the impression of being on a luxury liner or yacht aesthetically reflects the industrial age. Built on undulating rocky landscaping, the house looks as if it were a ship with porthole windows, its large stone prow cutting through waves of water (the serpentine wall). The serpentine wall also had the additional function of hiding the servants' door to the kitchen, which was at the top of the ramp behind this wall. The use of stone in this house reflected the local rocky landscape and Harrison used the stone to make the house blend in with the country landscape around it. The residence remains as one of the first houses in the contemporary style built in Westchester County, and thus Harrison helped bring the aesthetic of early-Modern architecture to the county.

The backyard, its gardens, and the surrounding woods on the property are 4.5 acres (1.8 ha) in size.

== Subsequent owners and renovations ==
The Julian Street Jr. residence is still extant. By 1974, the house was owned by Howard and Janette R. Tomkins and the property was subdivided to allow a separate building lot. Other changes were the removal of the stone wall and guardrail by the driveway, which was then paved with asphalt, and building a playhouse at the top of a rock pile in front of the house. The house was also changed: the stone wall behind the house was extended into a curve while the front gravel walkway was retained, the ramp behind the serpentine wall had stairs added to it, a curved wall was added in front of the front door, and a flagstone terrace was added to the back and side of the west part of the house. By the late 1970s, the house was owned by the Birnbaum family, who added steps to the front ramp up to the house, reduced the height of the serpentine wall, and added a raised entertainment area in part of the large living room.

In 2001, the house was purchased by Robert Niosi, Sally Lee, and their family, and Niosi undertook a major renovation of the home: he expanded the kitchen and changed the door to the servants' quarters into a bookshelf. He also renovated the master bedroom upstairs but left the circular windows alone, expanding the front door window to let more light into the front hallway, and he copper-paneled the front Dutch-style door. In addition, the outdated boiler system was replaced, and the entrance to the living room was widened. Niosi left the exterior relatively unchanged, but he said that when he bought the house, it was very "austere" inside—the walls were simple white or beige in color, with no ornamentation; the only decoration was on the unique Harrison-designed spiral staircase to the second floor, which had brass bamboo supports that Niosi left alone; he stated that the staircase had been built in Japan and exported in one piece. Niosi had previously lived in a Victorian apartment, decorated both inside and out, so when he moved to this Harrison-designed house, it was initially cold and unwelcoming with its simplicity and lack of decoration. To address this, Niosi added more traditional 1930s Mackintosh Arts and Crafts interior wood paneling and William Morris wallpaper in order to decorate and soften the interior of the house and make it more warm and inviting. This redecoration gave this residence a unique combination of a conventional 1930s Arts and Crafts interior design with an unconventional early Modernist exterior. He also had many walls and doors removed that were deemed unnecessary, and raised ceilings and added windows. The house's kitchen, with an adjoining maid's room and bathroom, was replaced with a modern kitchen. The living room was split to include a home theater and the wet bar was replaced to accommodate a film collection. After the remodel, parts of the house were featured in Ladies' Home Journal and Parents.

Niosi has also been noted for a replica time machine, based on the prop used in The Time Machine, a 1960 film based on H. G. Wells' novella of the same name. The model, which has taken about fourteen years to construct, lies in the house's basement.

== See also ==
- History of Briarcliff Manor
