= Vanderlip =

Vanderlip is a surname. Notable people with the surname include:

- Dolly Vanderlip (born 1937), American baseball player
- Narcissa Cox Vanderlip (1879–1966), American suffragist
- Frank A. Vanderlip (1864–1937), American banker and journalist

== See also ==
- Vanderlip, West Virginia, unincorporated community in the United States
