= Roger Leslie Farnham =

Roger Leslie Farnham was an American banker at National City Bank of New York (predecessor of Citibank). He was involved with attempts to take over Haiti’s national bank. He was instrumental in promoting U.S. intervention in Haiti and promoting the bank's interests there. His role has been described as an example of "racial capitalism".

He was born in Washington D.C. in 1864. He worked for a decade as a lobbyist for corporate law firm Sullivan and Cromwell before joining National City Bank in 1911.

"Roger Leslie Farnham was a former journalist turned lobbyist when National City Bank poached him in 1911. His mandate was to push the bank's.." -NYT

He gave testimony to the U.S. Senate.

== See also ==
- Banque Nationale de la République d’Haïti
- Frank A. Vanderlip, bank president
- United States occupation of Haiti
