= Edward Harden Mansion =

Historic house in New York, United States

- U.S. National Register of Historic Places
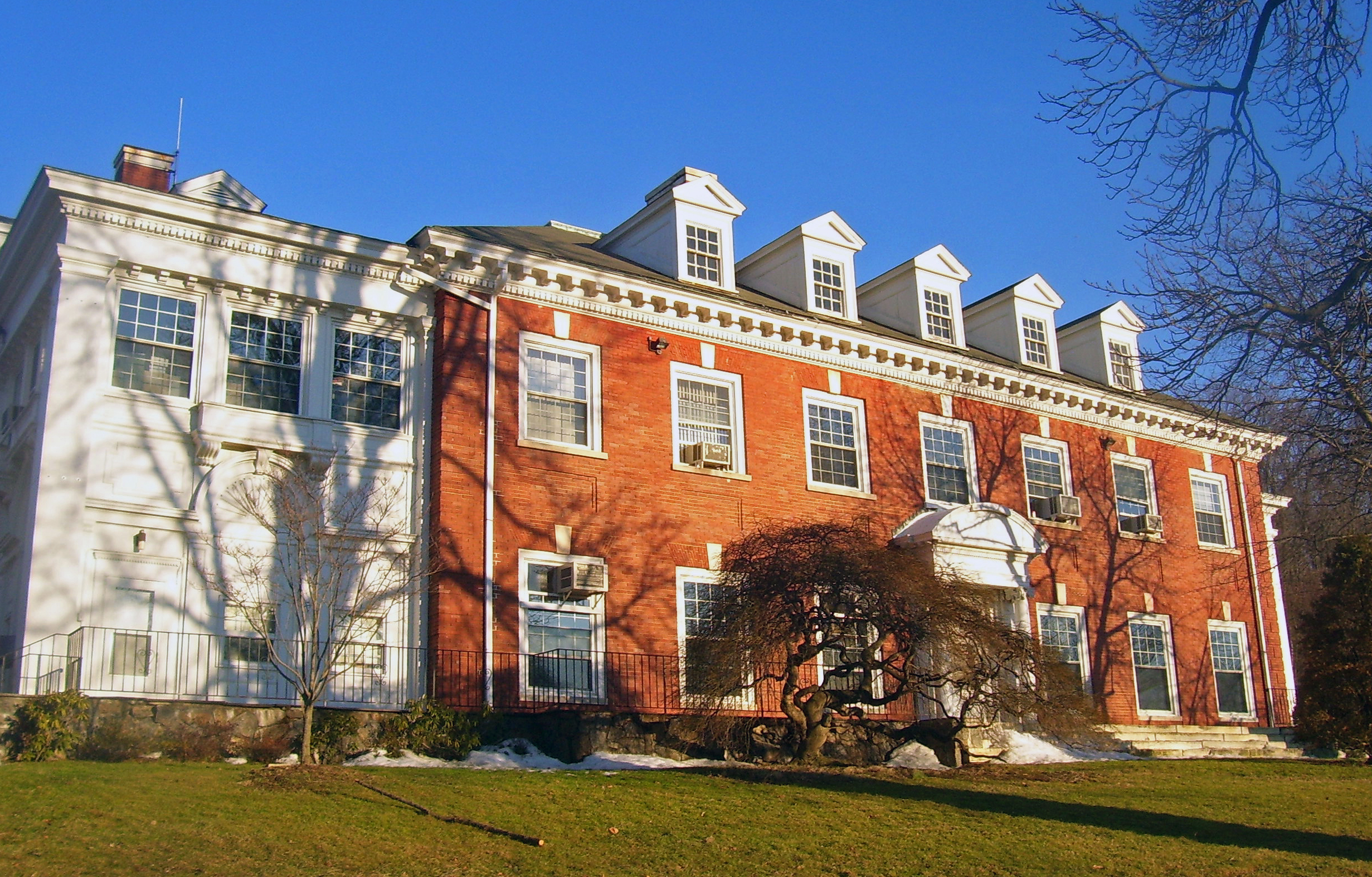
- West elevation, 2009

- Location within New York Location within the United States
- Interactive map showing the location of Edward Harden Mansion
- Location: Sleepy Hollow, NY
- Nearest city: White Plains
- Coordinates: 41°4′58″N 73°51′26″W
- Architect: Hunt & Hunt
- Architectural style: Georgian Revival
- NRHP reference No.: 03001401
- Added to NRHP: January 16, 2004

The Edward Harden Mansion, also known as Broad Oaks, is a historic home located on North Broadway (U.S. Route 9) in Sleepy Hollow, New York, United States, on the boundary between it and neighboring Tarrytown. It is a brick building in the Georgian Revival style designed by Hunt & Hunt in the early 20th century, one of the few mansions left of many that lined Broadway in the era it was built. Also on the property is a wood frame carriage house that predates it slightly. Both buildings were listed on the National Register of Historic Places in 2003. The mansion is part of Westchester County's historical Millionaires' Row.

Edward Harden had earned fame and fortune as the Chicago Tribune reporter who broke the story of Admiral George Dewey's victory in the Battle of Manila Bay. He later left journalism for finance, and after earning a seat on the New York Stock Exchange commissioned the house. Shortly after it was built, he allowed part of the home to be used for a new kindergarten that was the first Montessori school in the U.S. The Harden family later moved to nearby Scarborough. It was used as a home for retired seamstresses and, in the middle of the century, sold to the local school district, which continues to use it as its main offices today.

== Building ==
The mansion is located atop a small hill on the east side of Broadway, adjacent to Patriot's Park, listed on the Register as the site where John André was captured during the Revolutionary War, exposing Benedict Arnold's espionage for the British. On the east property line is the Old Croton Aqueduct, a National Historic Landmark. The house straddles the municipal boundary between Sleepy Hollow and neighboring Tarrytown. It and the park are the transitional area between the densely developed downtown sections of the two communities, to the west, and residential areas to the east, marked by tall mature trees sheltering houses on large lots. Sleepy Hollow High School and the district's middle school are to the north and the elementary John Paulding School is to the south. A drive leads up from Broadway, curving south to a parking lot to the southwest. Another large parking lot is in the rear.

The main house itself is a brick-faced nine-by-five-bay structure, two and a half stories tall with dormer windows and brick chimneys piercing its hip roof. On the north and south end are two-story, three-bay flat-roofed wings faced in decorative woodwork. A one-story service wing is on the rear, and an open porch on a stonework foundation with an iron railing runs along the ground floor of the west (front) facade, wrapping around both porches.

All windows on the seven bays of the main block's west facade are double-hung sash, 20-over-1 on the first floor (except for modern, narrower one-over-one on the northwest corner) and 15-over-15 upstairs. Some have projecting window air conditioner units. They have marble sills and splayed brick lintels with marble keystones. Recessed panels are worked into the brick between the two stories; the corners are quoined. At the roofline is a modillioned, dentilled cornice. The small six-over-six double-hung sash in the five dormers are topped with pedimented gables.

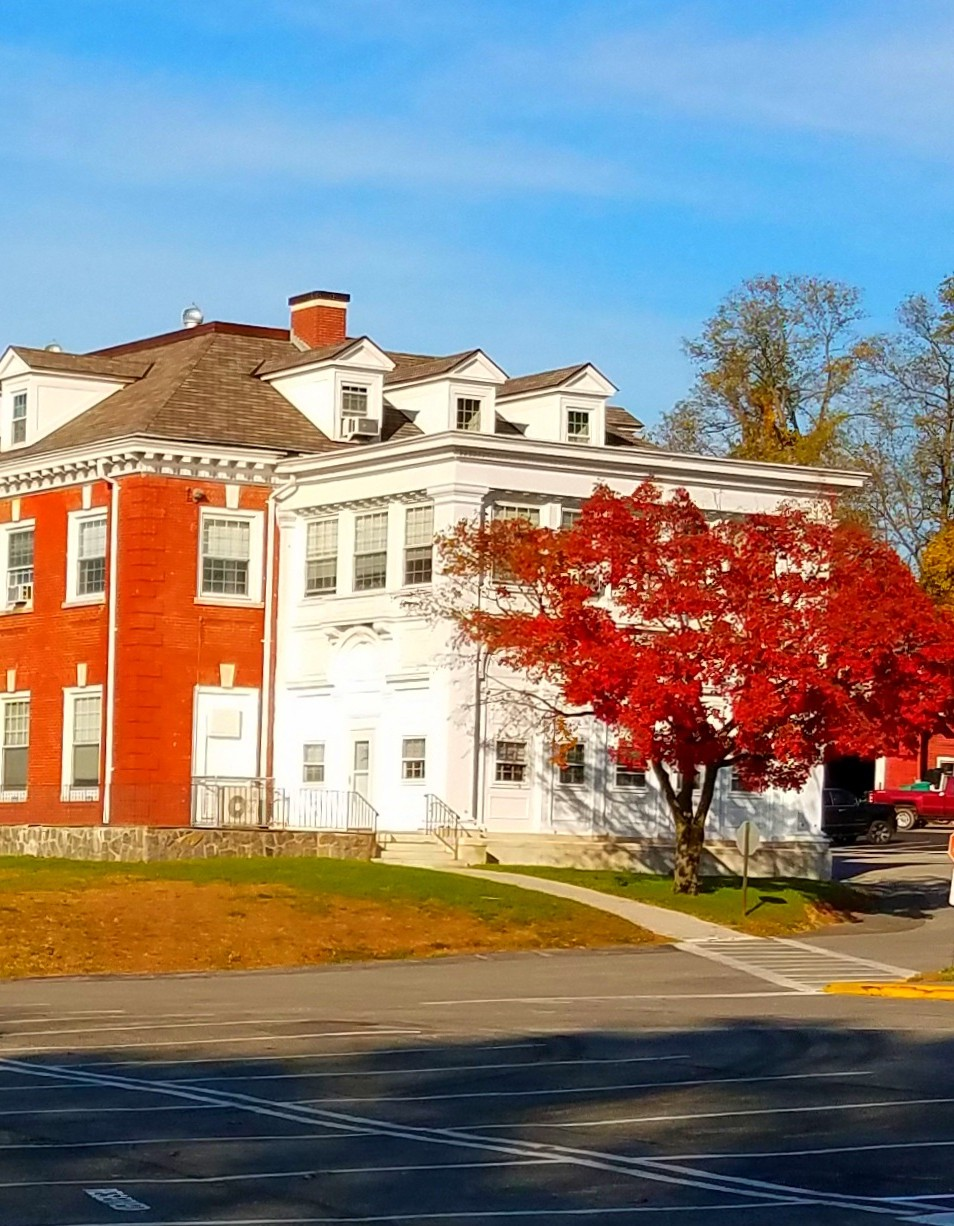
South wing

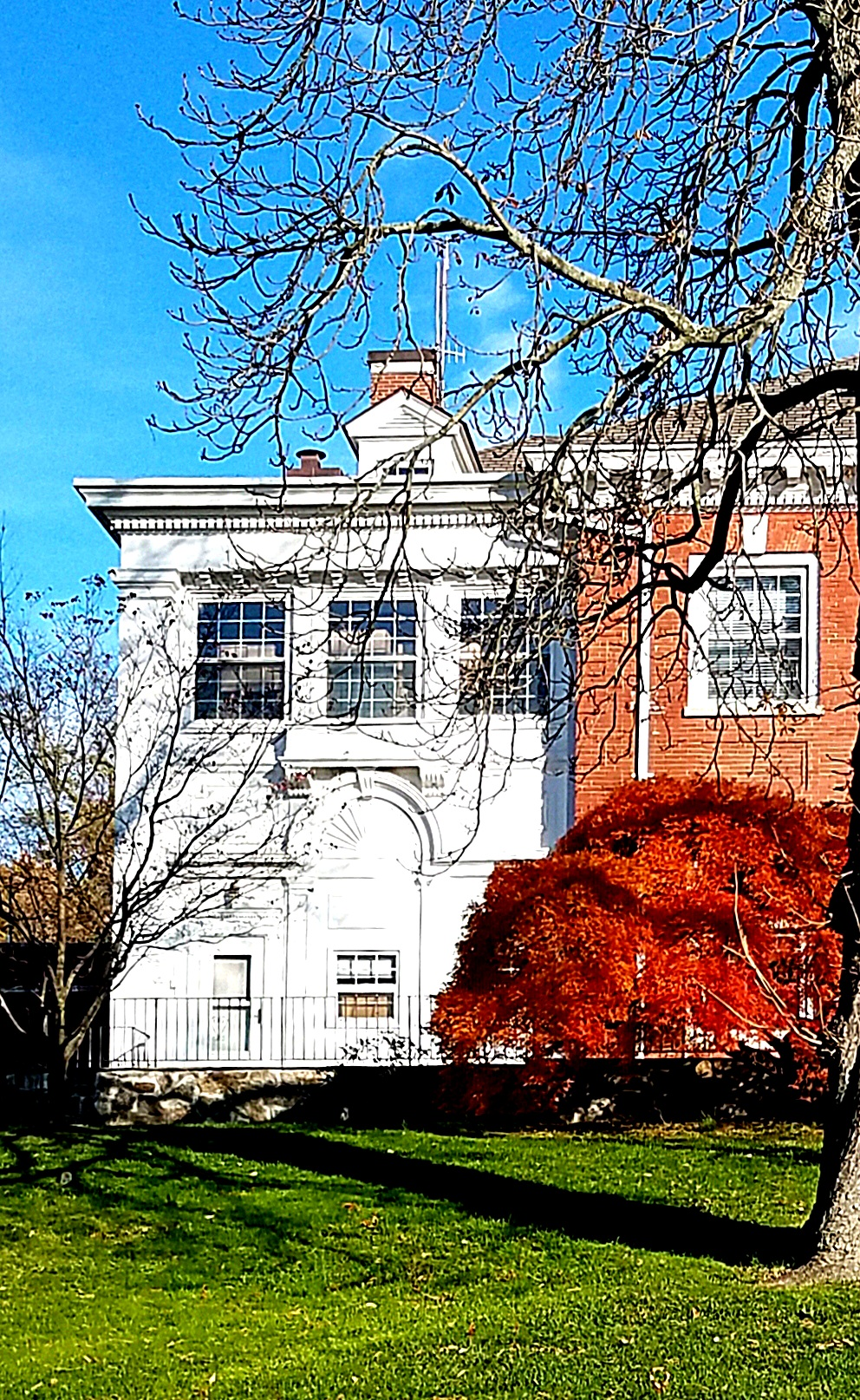
North wing

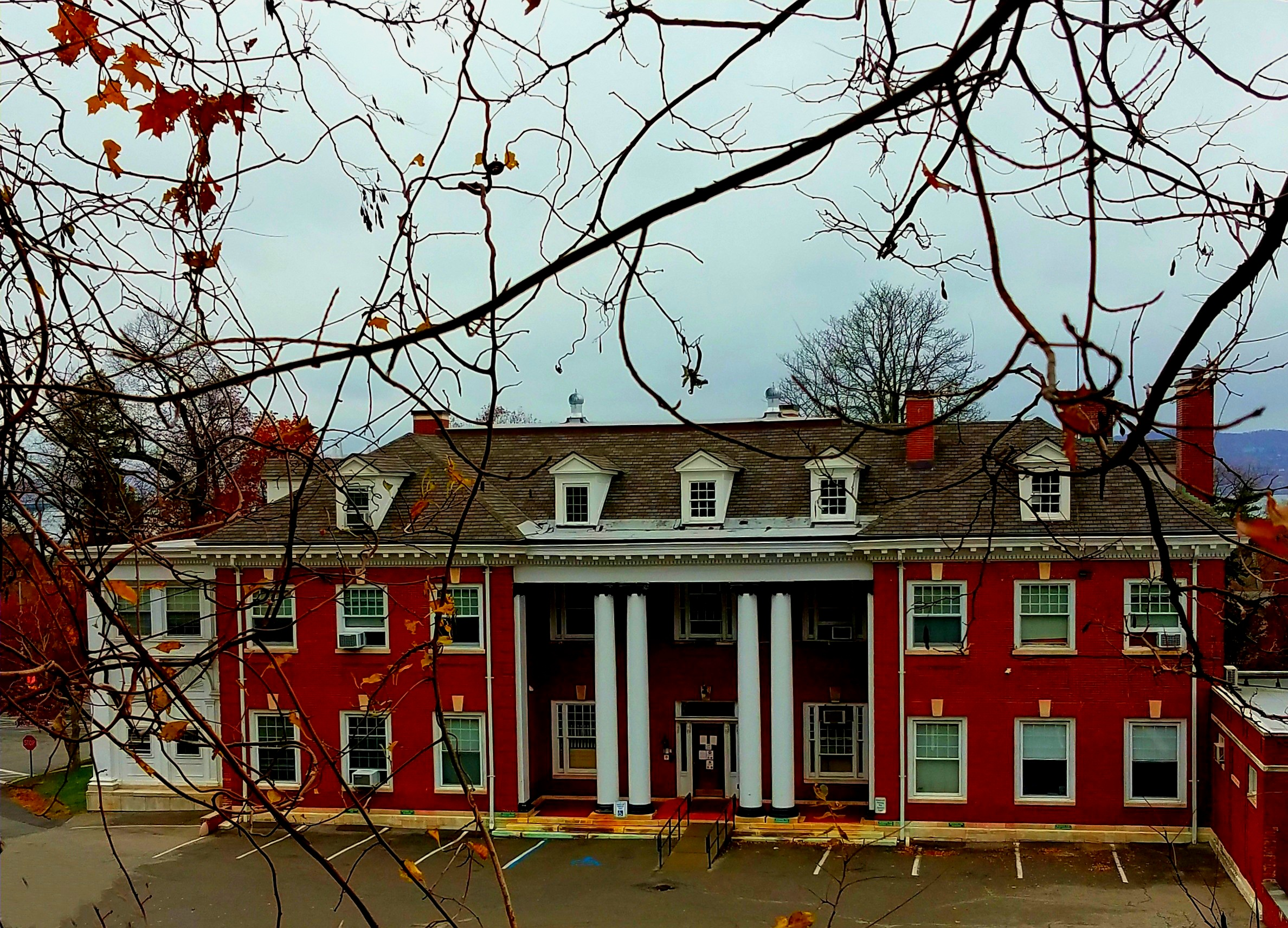
East facade, with the original front entrance

From the center of the south facade the porch projects. It is a three-by-three-bay two-story wooden extension with a flat roof. Corner pilasters support a frieze with molded dentils. On the first story all windows are small six-over-six double-hung sash, replacing the original French windows. They are within semicircular arches supported by paneled pilasters. On the second floor the 12-over-12 double-hung sash form balconettes. Above it three more gabled dormers pierce the roof. The north porch is similar but smaller, recessed slightly into the corner. Both porches are flanked on the main block by windows with the same treatment as the corresponding windows on the west facade. On the northeast corner, the service wing has a flat roof, windows in a variety of configurations, and an entrance porch.

The east facade runs the full nine bays since it includes the rear of the north porch. Its windows are the same as the others on the house. In its center is a recessed three-bay two-story entrance porch, the house's original front entrance, creating three-bay flanking pavilions with two smooth columns on either side supported by sandstone Composite capitals. In the center bay the entrance has its original stained wooden single-panel door with narrow pilasters and leaded glass sidelights and transom.

Similar columns flank the west entrance, which is topped by a single-bay pedimented segmental-arched porch. The door itself has been replaced with a modern one; its overhead transom has been filled in as well. It opens into a large entrance hall with a staircase reported to have been brought from a genuine Colonial house in Boston. The walls that once separated the dining room on the north and drawing room on the south have been removed. Many original finishes remain, such as the plaster walls and ceilings; wood, plaster and marble fireplace mantels and black walnut woodwork in other places. The bathrooms upstairs retain their white tile floors.

The carriage house is a one-and-a-half-story wood-frame building at the northeast corner of the property. It has a clipped gable roof, bracketed eaves and a small cupola. Its windows are double-hung sash in a variety of configurations.

== History ==
In 1898, then 29-year-old Chicago Tribune business editor Edward Harden was riding along on the USS Hugh McCulloch, a revenue cutter, when it was summoned to join the Asiatic Squadron under the command of Commodore George Dewey, as the Spanish–American War broke out. He was one of three reporters who witnessed Dewey's victory in the Battle of Manila Bay, the first by the U.S. Navy over a foreign fleet since the War of 1812. From Hong Kong he was able to scoop the other two by paying the telegraph operator with a bag of gold to expedite the dispatch to his paper. It reached the United States ahead of Dewey's official report, which had been sent first, and even President William McKinley found out when the Tribune's editor awoke him with the news.

Seven years later, after service as a special commissioner in the Philippines and editor of the Chicago Journal, he left journalism for finance and business. He was successful enough as a stock trader to earn a seat on the New York Stock Exchange, and married Ruth Vanderlip, sister of Frank Vanderlip, Assistant Treasury Secretary during the Spanish–American War and later president of National City Bank. The couple and their children were drawn to the Tarrytowns, where many other prominent wealthy families of the time lived.

They commissioned Hunt & Hunt, a firm run by the sons of Richard Morris Hunt, to design the house in what was then known as North Tarrytown, in 1909. Harden bought four acres (1.6 ha), which included the carriage house, likely built for a predecessor house. The architects chose the new Georgian Revival style for the building, which was widely covered by New York and Chicago newspapers. Harden was aware of the Revolutionary-era history of the nearby land, and may have chosen an 18th-century revival style to reflect this. He collected memorabilia related to John André, a collection held today by the Tarrytown Historical Society, and later bought the land for use as a public park.

After two years at the mansion, the school was moved to the Vanderlips' property in nearby Briarcliff Manor, where it became the Scarborough School. Among its later students were some of Franklin Delano Roosevelt's grandchildren. The Hardens, too, moved to Scarborough in 1926, supposedly finding Broadway had become "too noisy". It was sold to the estate of Margaret Howard, an Irish immigrant who had become a millionaire dressmaker in New York. She had directed in her will that a large amount of money be used to purchase and maintain a home for retired seamstresses like those who had worked for her, an unusual idea at the time. Two years after the sale, in 1928, the Sisters of Mercy managed the home as the first residents moved in.

The seamstresses kept busy, sewing uniforms for American troops during World War II. Ten years after the war, in 1955, the house was sold to the Union Free School District of the Tarrytowns, which converted it slightly. The mansion to the north had already been used as the basis for a private boys' school, the building that is now Sleepy Hollow High School. Later the southern mansion became John Paulding School, named for one of the local militiamen who had apprehended André nearby. The district has continued to use it as its administration building.

== See also ==
- National Register of Historic Places listings in northern Westchester County, New York
