= Scarborough Day School =

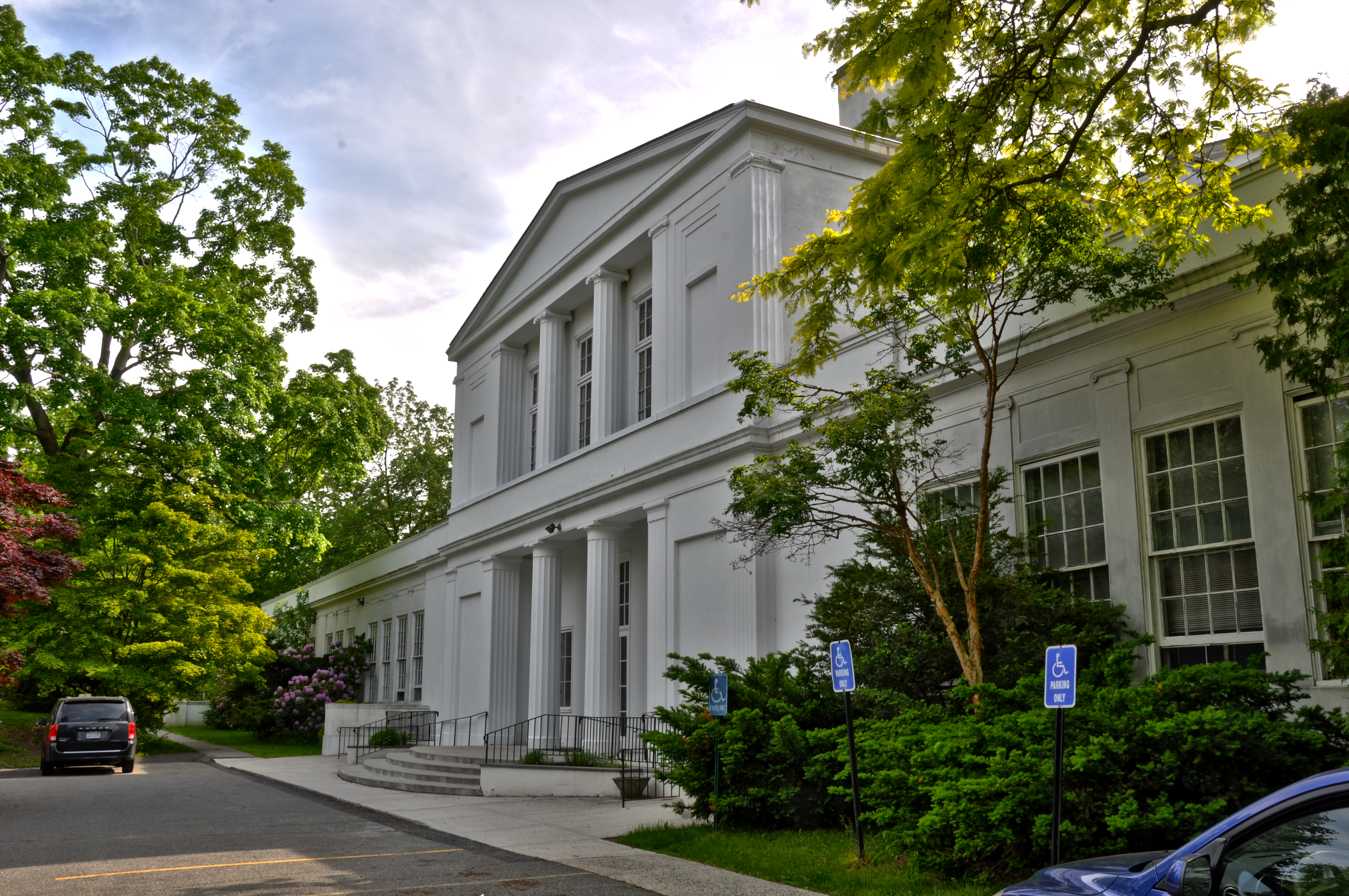
- Vanderlip Hall in 2014

Location
- U.S. Route 9 Briarcliff Manor, New York 10510; United States

Information
- School type: Private
- Motto: "Life Is For Service" and "Manners Maketh Man"
- Established: 1913
- Founder: Frank and Narcissa Cox Vanderlip
- Closed: 1978
- Grades: PK-12
- Gender: Coed
- Enrollment: 367 (peak in 1929); 150 (later years)
- Campus type: Suburban
- Yearbook: Beechwood Tree
- Scarborough Day School
- U.S. National Register of Historic Places
- U.S. Historic district – Contributing property
- Area: 22 acres (8.9 ha)
- Architect: William W. Bosworth
- NRHP reference No.: 84003433
- Added to NRHP: September 7, 1984
- 41.131944°N 73.861306°W

The Scarborough Day School (Note: The school was also known as the Scarborough School or the Scarborough Country Day School.) was a private school in Scarborough-on-Hudson, in Briarcliff Manor, New York, United States. Frank and Narcissa Cox Vanderlip established the school in 1913 at their estate, Beechwood. The school, a nonsectarian nonprofit college preparatory day school, taught students at pre-kindergarten to twelfth grade levels and had small class sizes, with total enrollment rarely exceeding 150 students. Since 1980, the buildings and property have been owned by The Clear View School Day Treatment Center, which runs a day treatment program for 118 students. The current school still uses the Scarborough School's theater, which was opened in 1917. The school campus is a contributing property to the Scarborough Historic District.

The Scarborough Day School was accredited by the Middle States Association of Colleges and Secondary Schools and the Board of Regents of the University of the State of New York. The school also was a member of the Cum Laude Society and the National Association of Independent Schools. Its seal copies that of Scarborough, North Yorkshire; Scarborough-on-Hudson's namesake.

== History ==
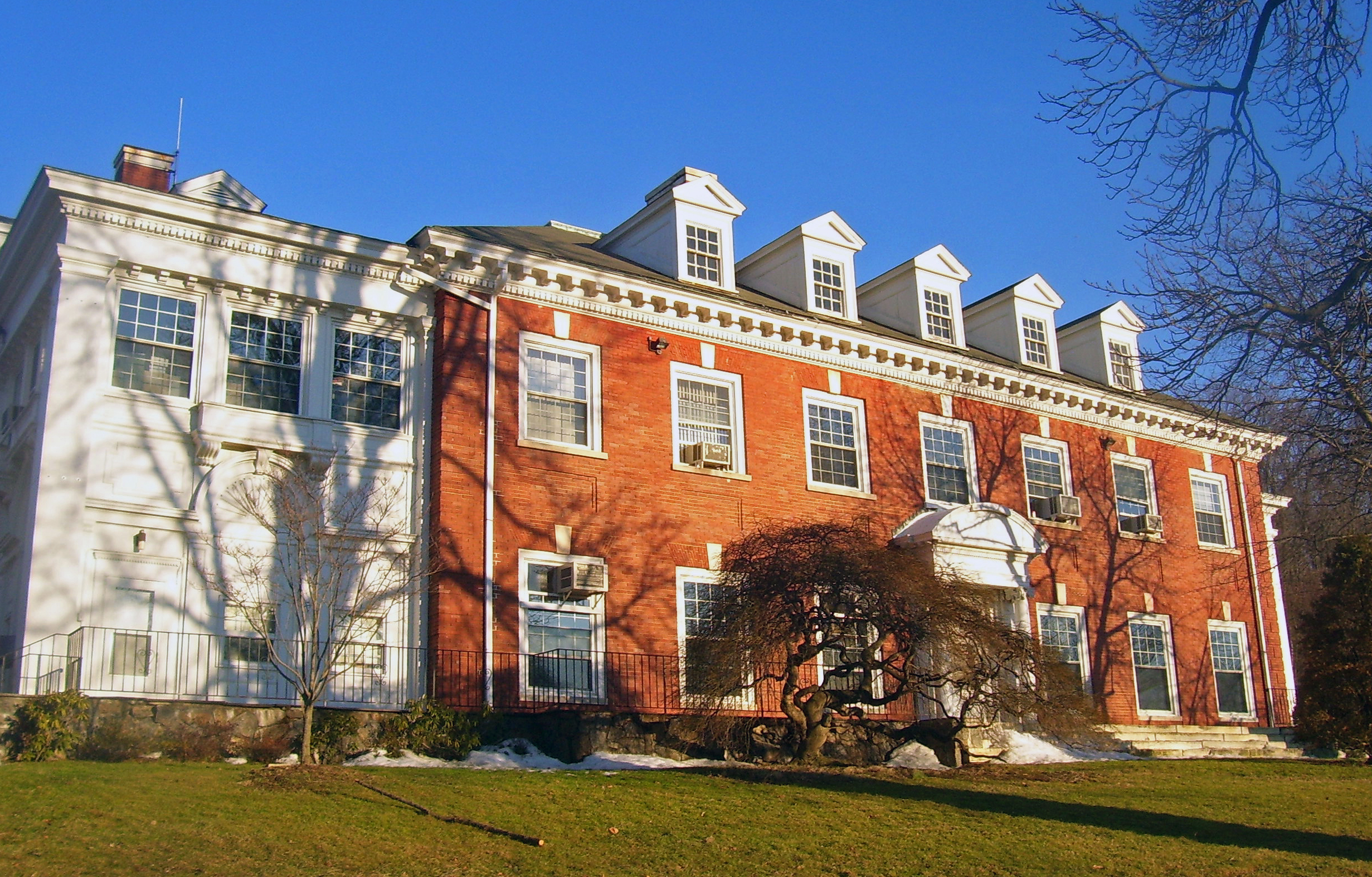
The Edward Harden Mansion

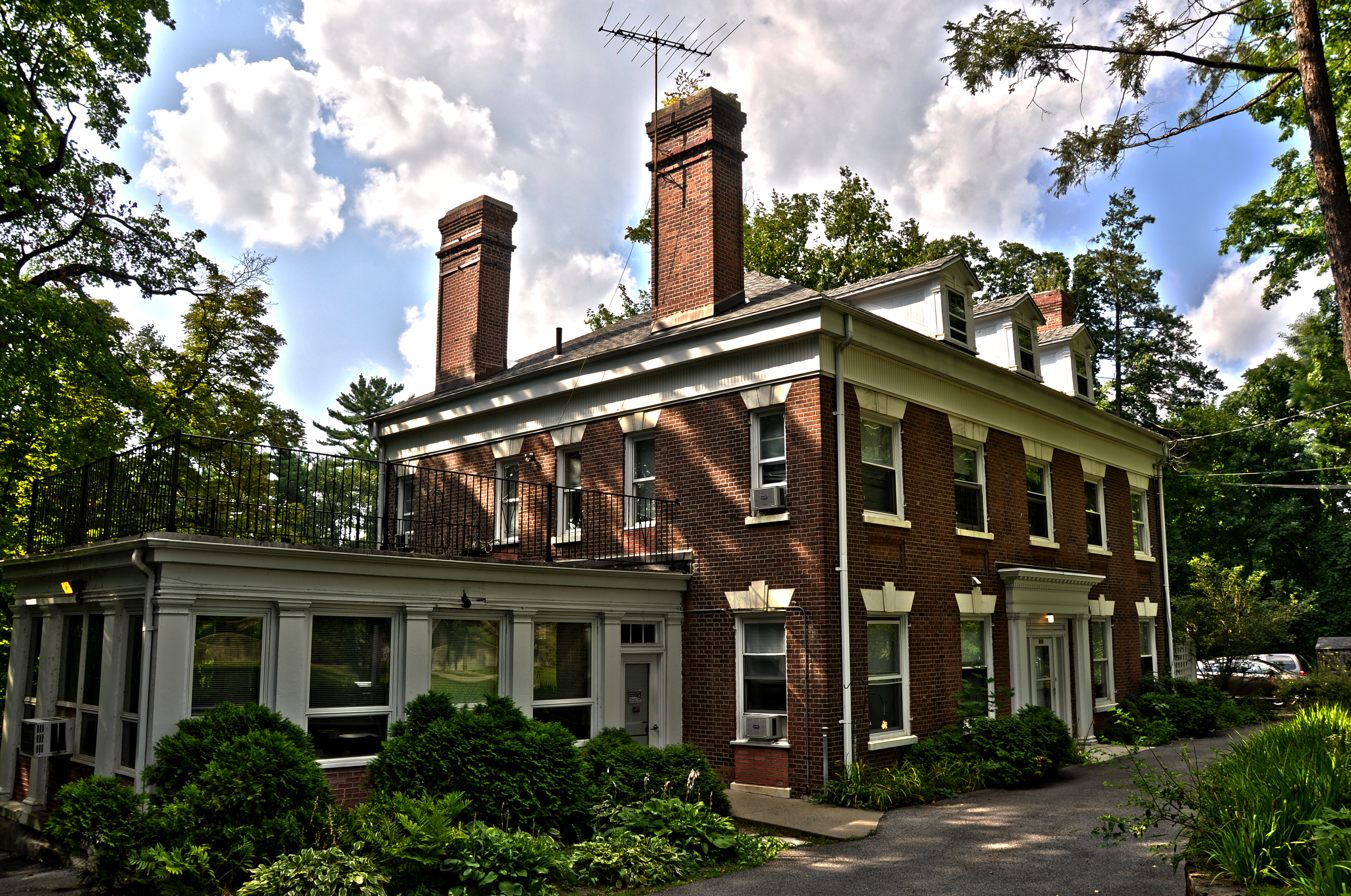
Marie Fayant Hall

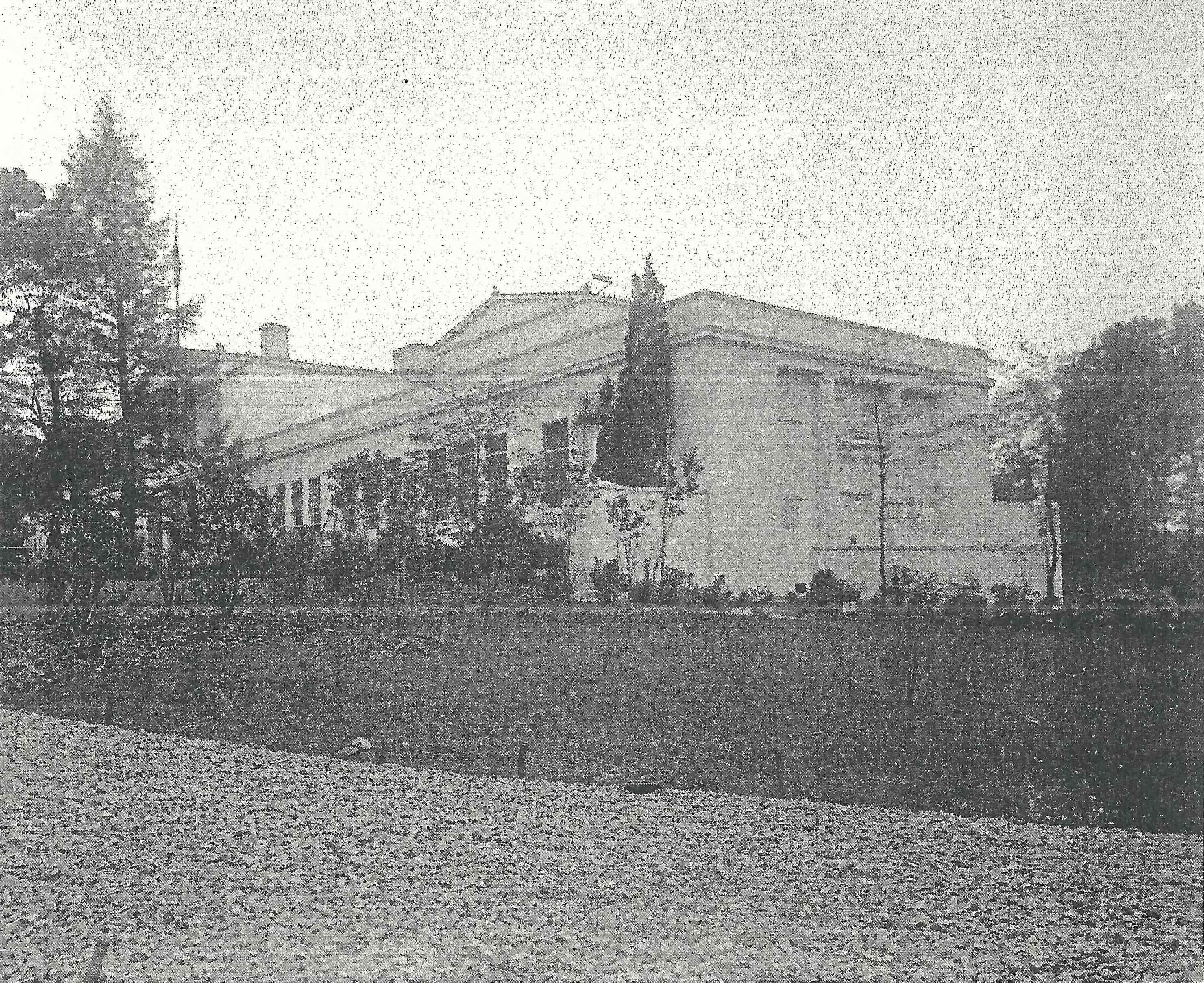
Vanderlip Hall, 1917

The Scarborough School was founded in 1913 by Frank A. Vanderlip and Narcissa Cox Vanderlip for their six children and the children of friends and neighbors. Having met educator Maria Montessori during their European travels, the Vanderlips pioneered the Montessori method at the Edward Harden Mansion in nearby Sleepy Hollow by creating the first Montessori school in the United States, in 1913. Frank Vanderlip's sister Ruth was married to Harden; the families maintained close ties. After a year existing in two rooms of the Harden residence, the school moved to the River Gate House at the north end of River Road and the Beechwood estate.

The school moved to its final location in 1917, at Vanderlip Hall, a building Vanderlip constructed in 1916 bordering Albany Post Road (current U.S. Route 9). The building was designed for classes of ten, to accommodate 120 children total. It was situated on Beechwood's 80-acre (320,000 m^{2}) parkland designed by Frederick Law Olmsted for the Vanderlips. Throughout the school's history, students were open to wander the woodlands and gardens, utilize the lawns and tennis courts, and swim in the Olympic-sized pool. There were always farm animals nearby for the children to see and play with and a circus carousel to ride on. The school had a gymnasium class, amateur theater group, folk singing, a swimming pool, and an economic forum. Frank Vanderlip had spent about $500,000 on the school ($12,564,900 in 2025), and he remained chairman of the school board of trustees until his death in 1937. Regular art exhibits were held at the Scarborough School, including a sculpture exhibition in the Italian garden at Beechwood, which included works by Jose de Creeft, Jason Seley (a longtime professor of sculpture at Cornell), and Richard Stankiewicz.

Early on in the school's history, the Vanderlips decided to change the school's system from the Montessori method to a more formal approach with more discipline, although students still had more freedom than the average school. In the 1930s, the school was considered progressive: students were not graded and were instructed to work at their own speed. The school flourished during almost two decades under the helm of Dr F. Dean McClusky, who went on to a career as a professor in the Department of Education at UCLA.

The studio building was devoted to younger children (grades one, two, and three), and included a lunchroom, workshop, and art studio. Frank Vanderlip enjoyed teaching simplified political economy at the school; he would act out Swiss Family Robinson on an imaginary island with students to demonstrate the development of capitalism. Narcissa Vanderlip ran the school lunchroom, and it is recorded that she served good simple food. She named some of her foods artistically (rice pudding with raisins was called Bête Noire a la Bolshevik). The studio building burned down in 1959.

Members of the Vanderlip family, particularly Virginia Vanderlip Schoales, continued to administer the school for sixty years. A 1959 development plan made way for a new primary school in 1961, new science facilities in 1962, expansion of the library in 1963, and the creation of an organization for alumni, of whom there were more than a thousand living in 1977. The school was unable to obtain sufficient funding and closed in 1978. In 1980, the buildings and property were taken over by The Clear View School Day Treatment Center, which opened in September 1981 after major renovations. The school runs a day treatment program for 118 students from nursery school age to 21, and is sponsored by the Association for Mentally Ill Children of Westchester; its program involves education, treatment, and crisis intervention and parent involvement.

== Campus ==
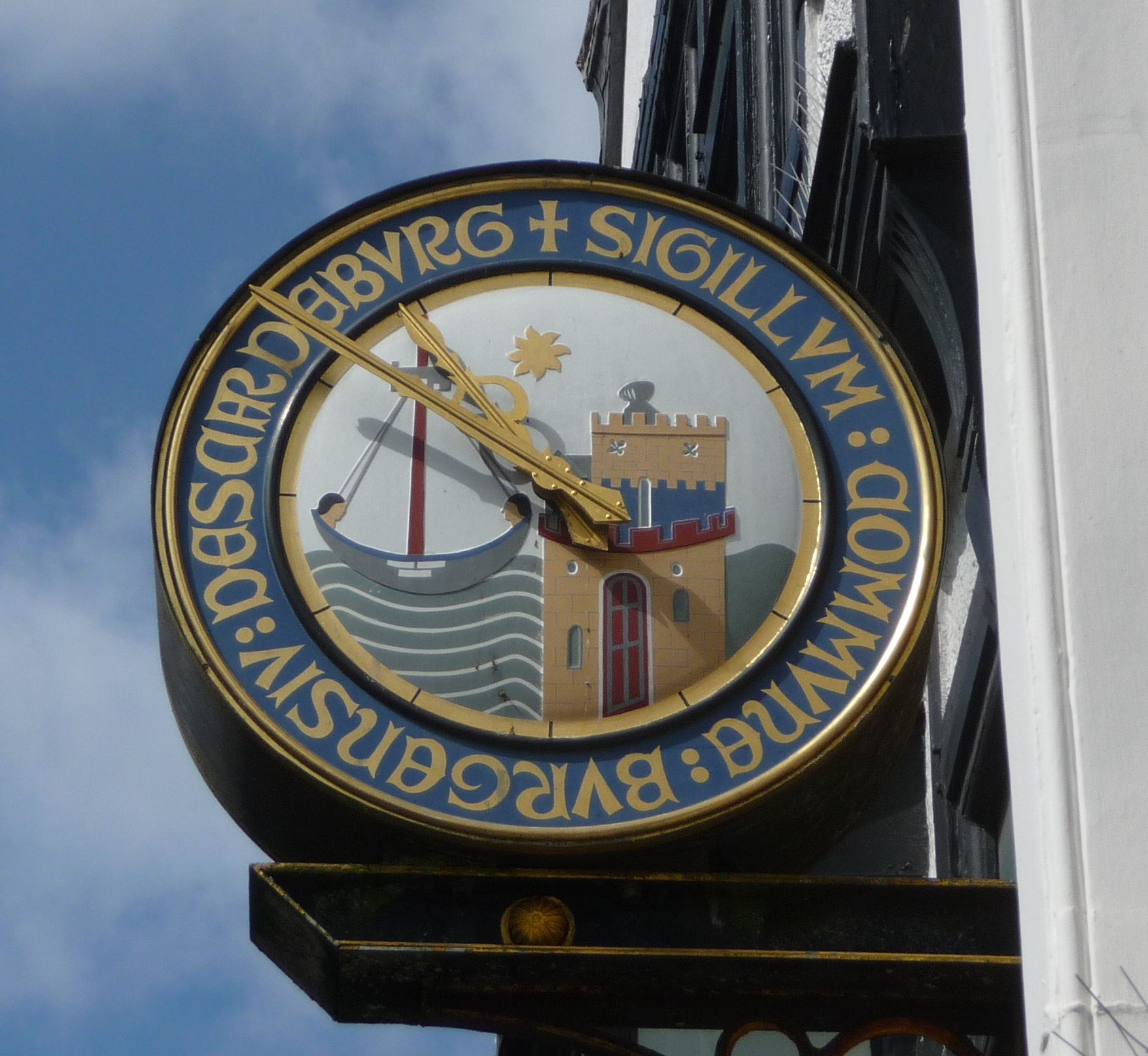
Seal of Scarborough, North Yorkshire; the school's seal replicates it

The main Scarborough School building, Vanderlip Hall, was designed by William W. Bosworth, known for landscaping Kykuit and restoring Versailles. The school building was constructed in a severe, all-white Neoclassical style, and was completed early in 1917. In addition to a grand porticoed entry, there were two wings that housed classes, a library, cafeteria and gymnasium, basement science labs, and an art room measuring 1,000 square feet (93 m^{2}), ringed on three sides with French windows. In the 1960s, an additional Modernist structure was built across a stream that would ultimately house the school's lower grades.

Rosemont, an estate and the birthplace of John Worden, was later used by Vanderlip as a dormitory for Scarborough School boarding students. Rosemont stood opposite the Beechwood estate, at the corner of Route 9 and Scarborough Road. Another campus building was Marie Fayant Hall, which was originally Barnesby House, home to Dr. Percy Norman Barnesby. Vanderlip built the house for him and his wife; the house was later given to the Scarborough School and served as a girls' dormitory in the 1940s and as a headmaster's residence about thirty years later.

=== Theater ===
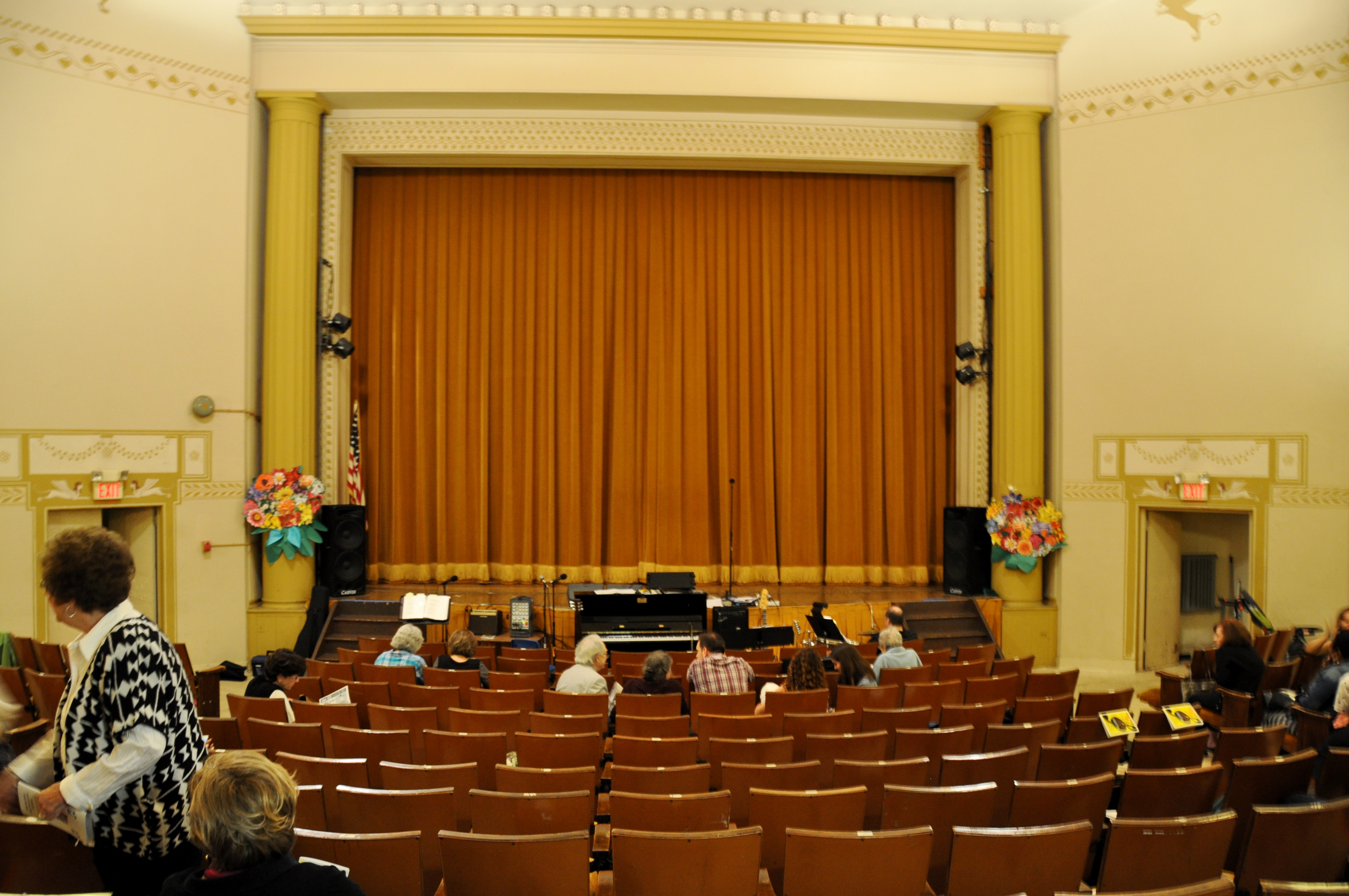
The Julie Harris Theater

Beechwood Theater, a replica of the Little Theater on Broadway, was included in Wells Bosworth's design of the primary school building because Vanderlip particularly wanted his own theater. Beechwood Theater, with 256 gold velvet seats, was designed by Winthrop Ames around 1917. Details were closely examined upon construction; the lighting equipment, the scene lofts and fly gallery, and the dressing rooms were well-designed and state-of-the-art. The stage floor was designed especially for dancing, and the acoustics and theater proportions made varieties of productions possible.

The theater was used for assemblies, plays, concerts, and lectures. It was also home to the Beechwood Players, an adult performing arts group which had its origins in 1919. The Players put on several plays a year, summer and winter, six plays a year and three-night runs. They had started with three one-act plays but had graduated to full-length dramas. From its first years, Broadway actors used the theater when not otherwise engaged. Among them were Sylvia Sidney, Laurette Taylor, Lynn Fontanne, James Dean, Judson Laire, and Parker Fennelly. Lecturers and performers in the Beechwood Theater included Sarah Bernhardt, Robert Frost, John Masefield, Vachel Lindsay, Eleanor Roosevelt, H. G. Wells, Stephen Vincent Benét, and a King of Siam. Other notable appearances at the theater included Charles Coburn and Isadora Duncan. Audiences have included Franklin D. Roosevelt, John D. Rockefeller Jr., Henry Ford and the last King of Poland.

The theater was opened and dedicated on January 2, 1917. The first concert took place on July 30, 1916, and was by Ignacy Jan Paderewski. During his performance, the Black Tom explosion took place at a munitions works in New Jersey, more than 30 miles (48 km) from Scarborough. Frank Vanderlip Jr., ten years old at the time, later recalled that he saw the detonation shake the jammed theater building, and that Paderewski had played on as if nothing had happened. The automatic fire doors at the top of the theater had sprung open, and two men were sent aloft to sit on them until the end of the performance to prevent a cold draft from entering the room.

Following the Scarborough School's closing, the Beechwood Theater had stood empty for many years, and was restored in 1983 by the Greater Ossining Area Community Theater. On March 17, 1984, The Clear View School presented a solo performance of Currier Bell, Esquire (a dramatization of Charlotte Brontë's life) performed by Julie Harris. The performance was a $100-a-ticket benefit for the school. Also on that day, the theater was rededicated as the Julie Harris Theater. Briarcliff High School used the theater until its own was constructed in 1998.

== Alumni ==
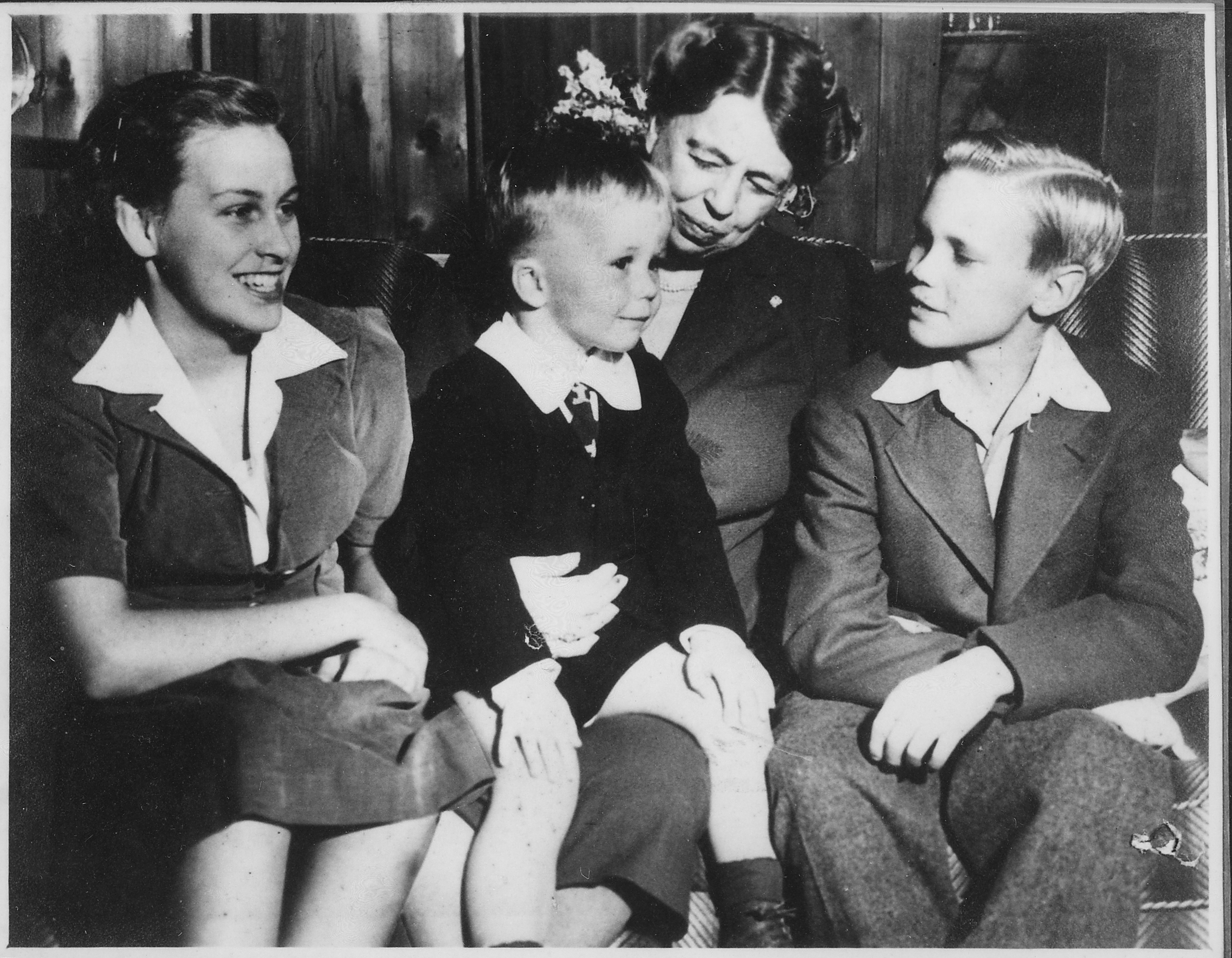
"Sistie" (left) and "Buzzie" (right), grandchildren of Franklin D. Roosevelt

Notable alumni of the Scarborough School include Secretary of the Army Stephen Ailes, Benjamin Cheever and his sister Susan Cheever, Richard Pousette-Dart, an Abstract Expressionist artist, graduated from the school in 1935. Anna Roosevelt Halsted lived with Curtis Bean Dall on nearby Sleepy Hollow Road; their children Eleanor "Sistie" and Curtis "Buzzie" (grandchildren of President and Mrs. Roosevelt) attended the Scarborough School. Other notable alumni include Mark Helprin, a writer who graduated in 1965; the three children of Ely Jacques Kahn, Jr.; John Kelvin Koelsch, a U.S. Navy officer during the Korean War and the first helicopter pilot to receive the Medal of Honor, who also lived in Scarborough; Ralph J. Menconi, a medallic sculptor; Ilyasah Shabazz, an author and a daughter of Malcolm X; and Richard Yates, a writer who attended from 1937 to 1939 while his mother taught sculpture there.

The theatrical traditions of the school attracted many pupils with interests or family connections in the performing arts, including actresses Joan Evans, Tina Louise, Alexandra Berlin, Broadway producer Dasha Amsterdam Epstein, musical theater composer Henry Krieger (who attended the school with his sister), Margot Feiner (a niece of Richard Rodgers), and Daniel and Margaret Da Silva (children of Howard Da Silva).

== Headmasters ==
Headmasters included:

- Elizabeth Moseley Dean (1913–1916)
- Dr. Ernest Horn (1917–1918)
- Wilford M. Aikin (1918–1922)
- Morton Snyder (1922–1926)
- Dr. Arthur H. Sutherland (1926–1927)
- Dr. Frank M. McMurry (1927–1928)
- Dr. F. Dean McClusky (1928–1945)
- Cornelius B. Boocock (1945–1948)
- Philip L. Garland (1948–1951)
- Thomas C. Schuller (1951–1961)
- H. L. Richardson (1964–1965)
- Robert C. Mellow (1967–1971)
- A.W. Rousseau (1971–1972)
- Donald F. Cantrell (1972–1974)
- Douglas G. Carner (1976–1978)
- Richard Pierce (1978)

== Gallery ==
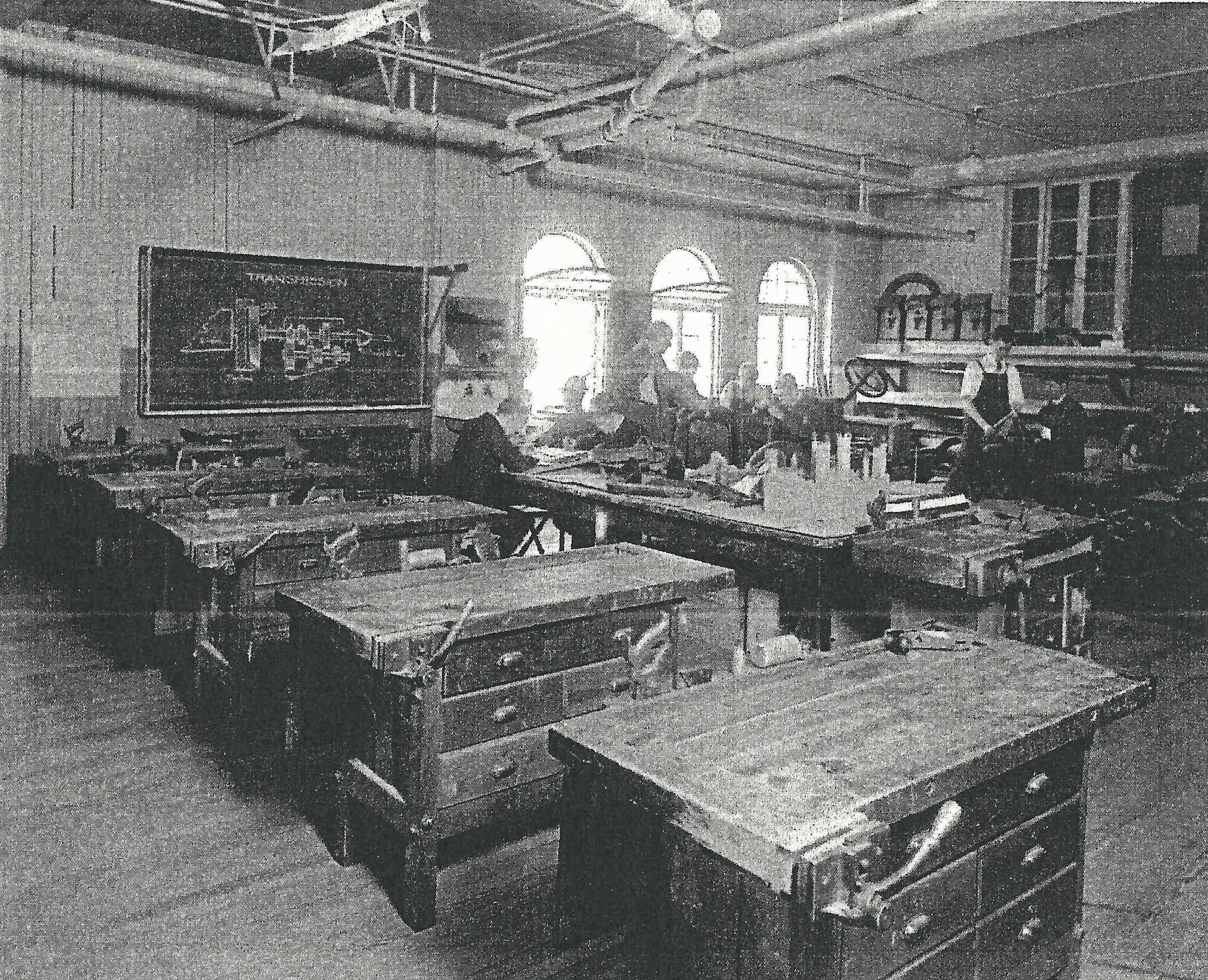
School Auto repair shop in 1917

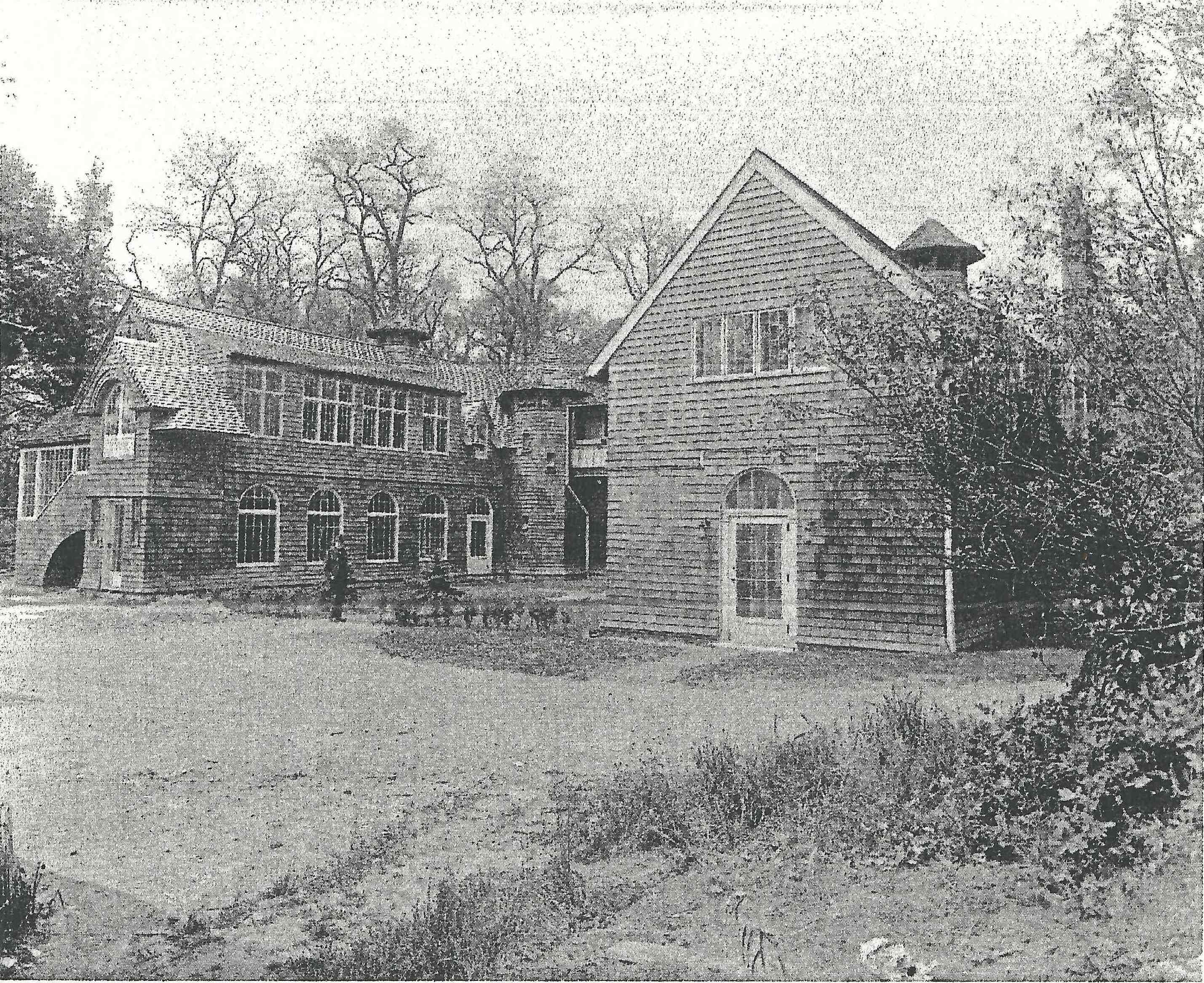
School studio building in 1917

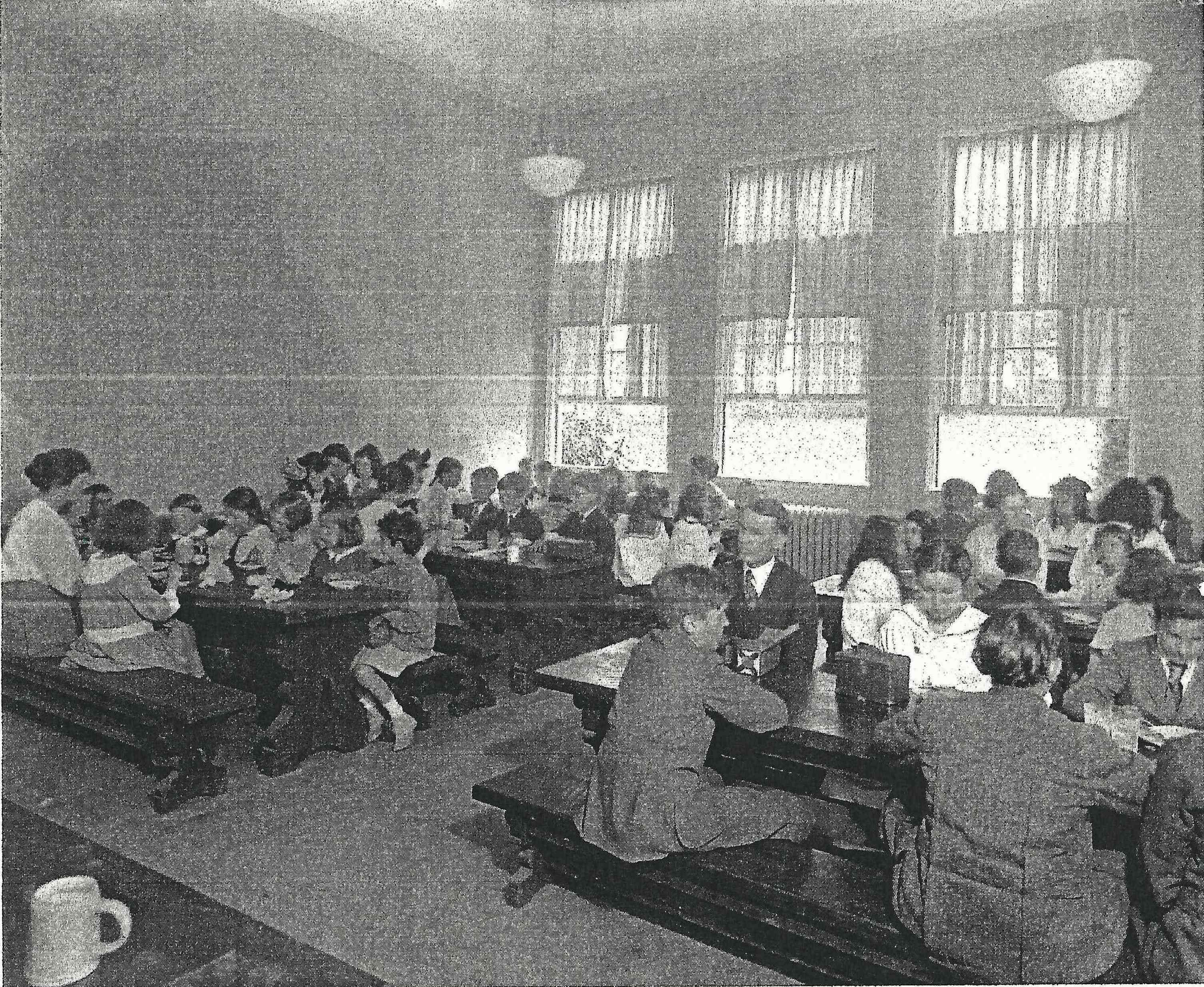
School dining room in 1917

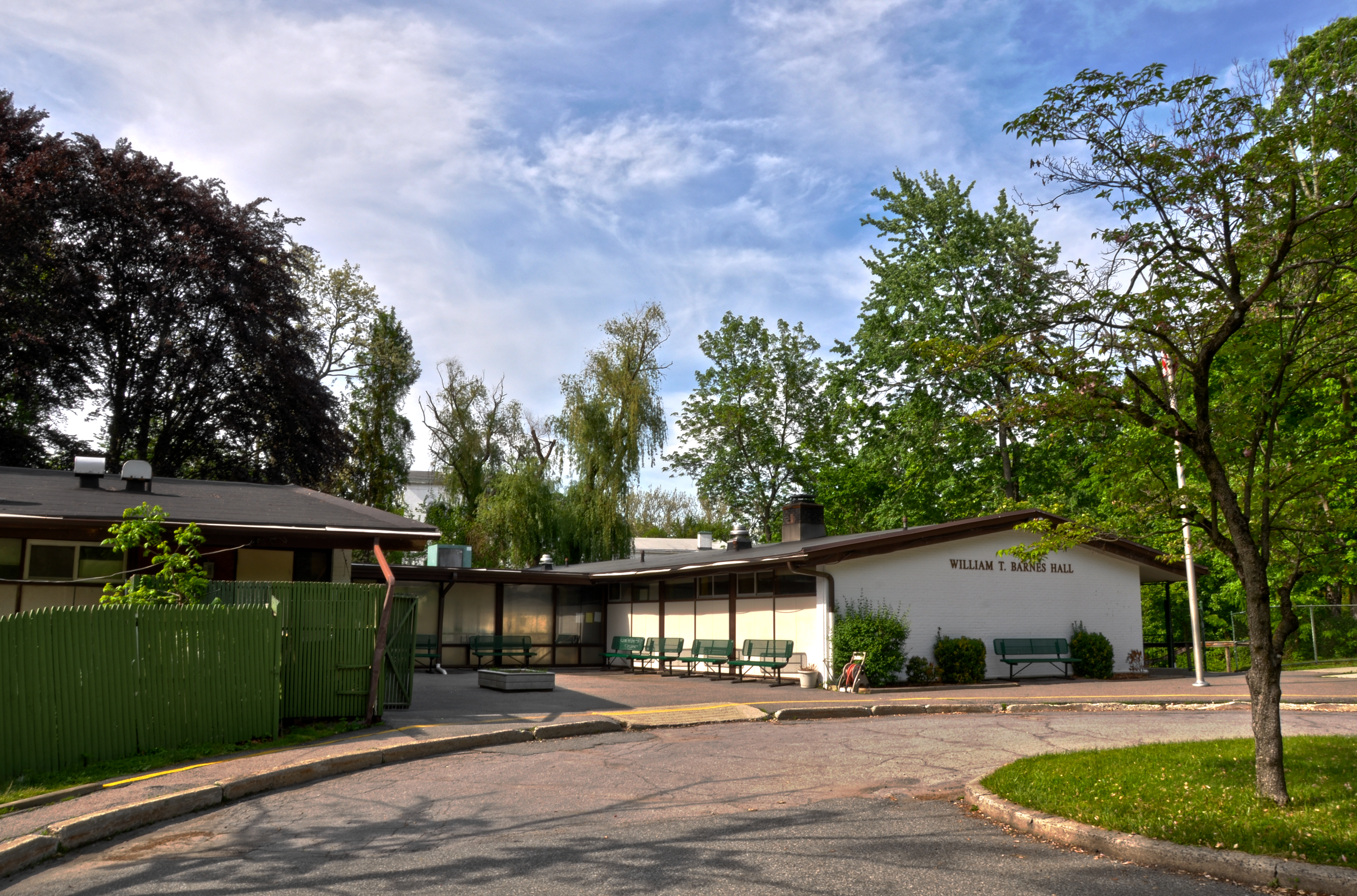
William T. Barnes Hall in 2014

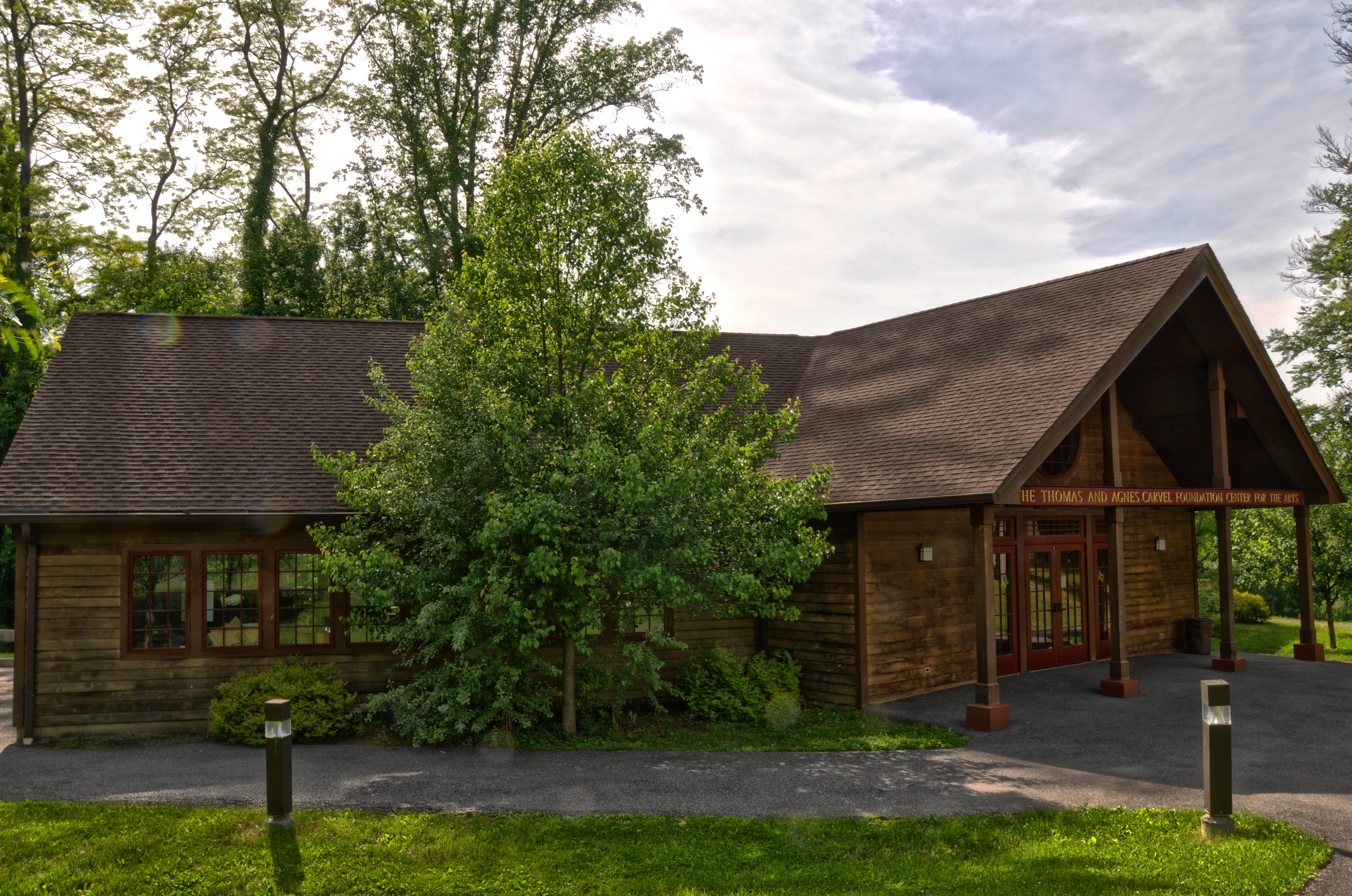
The Thomas and Agnes Carvel Foundation Center for the Arts, opened May 17, 2006

== See also ==
- Beechwood (Vanderlip mansion)
- Country Day School movement
