= Beechwood (Vanderlip mansion) =

- U.S. Historic district – Contributing property
- West elevation
- Location: 1–3 Beechwood Way, Briarcliff Manor, New York 10510
- Area: 33.3 acres (13.5 ha)
- Built: 1780
- Part of: Scarborough Historic District (ID84003433)
- Added to NRHP: September 7, 1984
- 41°08′N 73°52′W

Beechwood is a Hudson River estate in Scarborough-on-Hudson, in Briarcliff Manor, New York. The estate was most notably the home of Frank A. Vanderlip and his family, and is a contributing property to the Scarborough Historic District. The house and property were owned by the Vanderlip family from 1906 to 1979. The property is now a 37-condominium complex as the result of a development project that began in the 1980s.

Beechwood is also known for being a filming location of the 1970 film House of Dark Shadows; a filming location and the primary setting of Savages, a 1972 Merchant Ivory film. and the site of a June 2016 premier of Money Man: Frank Vanderlip and the Birth of the Federal Reserve, also filmed there.

== History ==
House exterior
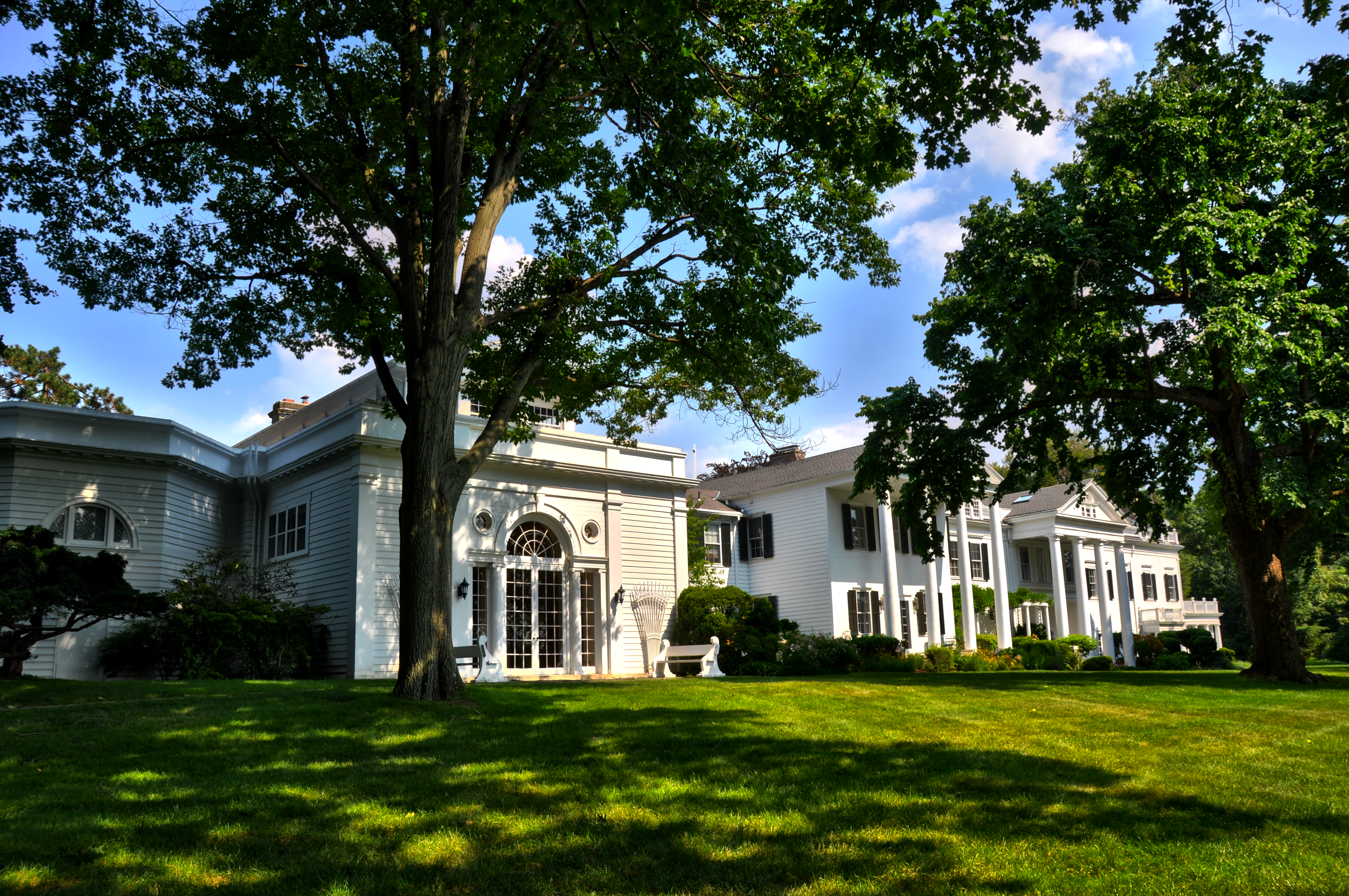

The first portion of the main residence dates to 1780, and includes the original kitchen's fireplace. Benjamin and Ann Folger were among the earliest residents, and named their residence "Heartt Place". In the 1830s, Folger deeded the estate to a self-proclaimed prophet, Robert Matthews, who believed himself to be the resurrected Matthias of the New Testament. Matthews persuaded his followers to fund an expansion to the house, which he had named "Zion Hill". During this time, future abolitionist Isabella Baumfree (Sojourner Truth) was a housekeeper to him. After he spent the money his followers and Folger had given him, Matthews became violent. Further on, he was tried for murder, and acquitted for lack of evidence. Matthews was later found guilty of assaulting his grown daughter, and he served a short jail term.

The property containing the mansion had been in the Remsen family for decades, including Anna Remsen Webb. In the 1890s, her husband's half-brother Henry Walter Webb substantially added to it from numerous properties, including the Remsen estate and William Creighton's estate (who had dubbed his house "Beechwood" after he purchased it in 1836). Henry Webb attached the name Beechwood to the entire estate and home. He renovated and expanded the mansion, hiring R. H. Robertson to double its size. Robertson employed the Colonial Revival style, intentionally compatible with the neoclassical Federal style of the original but more ornate.

Frank A. Vanderlip and his wife Narcissa Cox Vanderlip purchased the 23-acre (9.3 ha) property from Webb's widow in 1906, and bought more property to make the estate a total 125 acres (51 ha). He hired William Welles Bosworth soon after to further enlarge the house and to design a wing for his library and the lawns of the estate. In 1907, while Vanderlip was vice president of the First National City Bank (later Citibank), he had two fluted smoked granite columns left over from a remodel of its headquarters at 55 Wall Street placed two-thirds above ground in Beechwood's entranceway off of Albany Post Road (today U.S. Route 9, closed due to increasing traffic volume, with the current entrance being off Scarborough Station Road). Vanderlip also reused a discarded wrought-iron elevator from the bank as a cage for his children's pet rabbits.

Among the guests hosted at Beechwood were Woodrow Wilson, Henry Ford, Sarah Bernhardt, Annie Oakley, Franklin D. Roosevelt, John D. Rockefeller, and Isadora Duncan. The Wright Brothers even landed a plane on the property. In 1910, Vanderlip bought the nearby mansion Woodlea, which his wife found to large and grandiose. Vanderlip then collaborated with other area wealthy to create Sleepy Hollow Country Club from Woodlea, which he sold in 1912. In 1924, Vanderlip purchased 57 acres (23 ha) of Rockefeller's Rockwood Hall's riverfront property to add to his estate. Actress-model Mary Louise Weller rented the estate in June 1973. In 1979, Vanderlip descendants sold the Beechwood property. Three condominiums were built during a transformation of the mansion in the 1980s. A later expansion resulted in a total of 37 condominiums on the property's 33.3 acres (13.5 ha).

== Description ==
Lawn

The mansion sits at the center of the property, near the southwest corner of Route 9 and Scarborough Station Road. It features two large porticoed entryways, a two-story octagonal library, numerous porches, verandas, and over 100 interior rooms. Other major structures included a hunting lodge, a second mansion built for the Vanderlips' daughter Charlotte, a home for the Vanderlips' physician, and the Scarborough School, a progressive school which the Vanderlips established just south of the mansion in 1916.

The 80-acre (32 ha) private parkland was designed by Frederick Law Olmsted and has expansive lawns, a grove of large beech trees, imported trees, and an Italianate garden with an alcove, fountain, and small pool with wisteria-covered trellises. The lawns, formal gardens, and stone gazebo have been preserved and feature in wedding ceremonies occasionally held at the property.

The Beechwood estate also contained a carriage house, gatehouse, squash court (demolished), and a white-stucco artist's studio named Beech Twig, which was home to author John Cheever, whose children attended the school on the property. The family rented the house until they moved to Ossining. Descriptions of the building's interior closely match those employed by Cheever in some short stories. In his youth, novelist Richard Yates also lived there, as well as other artists, writers, and composers. The estate's garage is located northeast of the mansion, and is a flat-roof, two-story concrete building dating to the early 1900s.

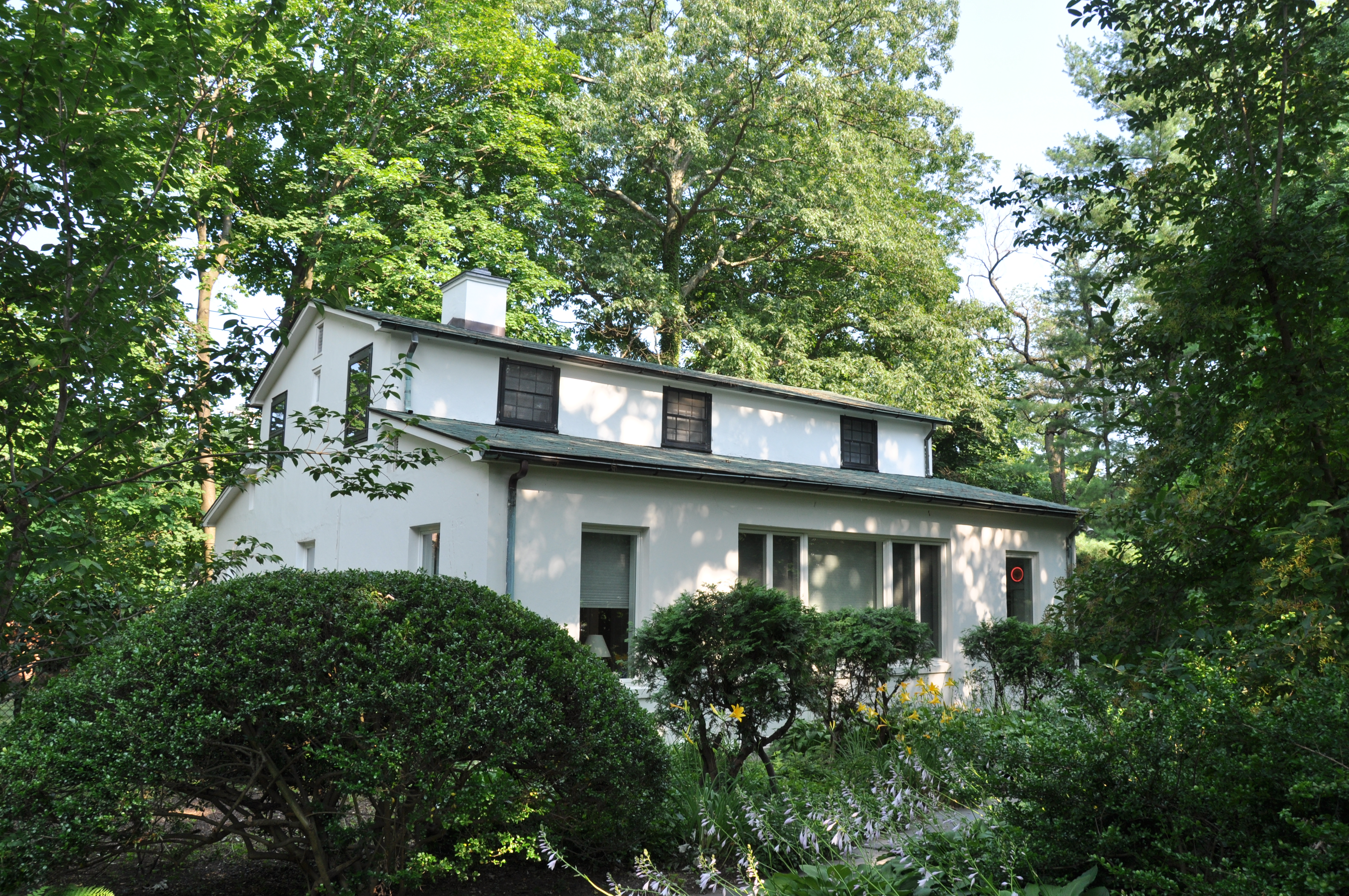
Beechtwig, one of two guest houses

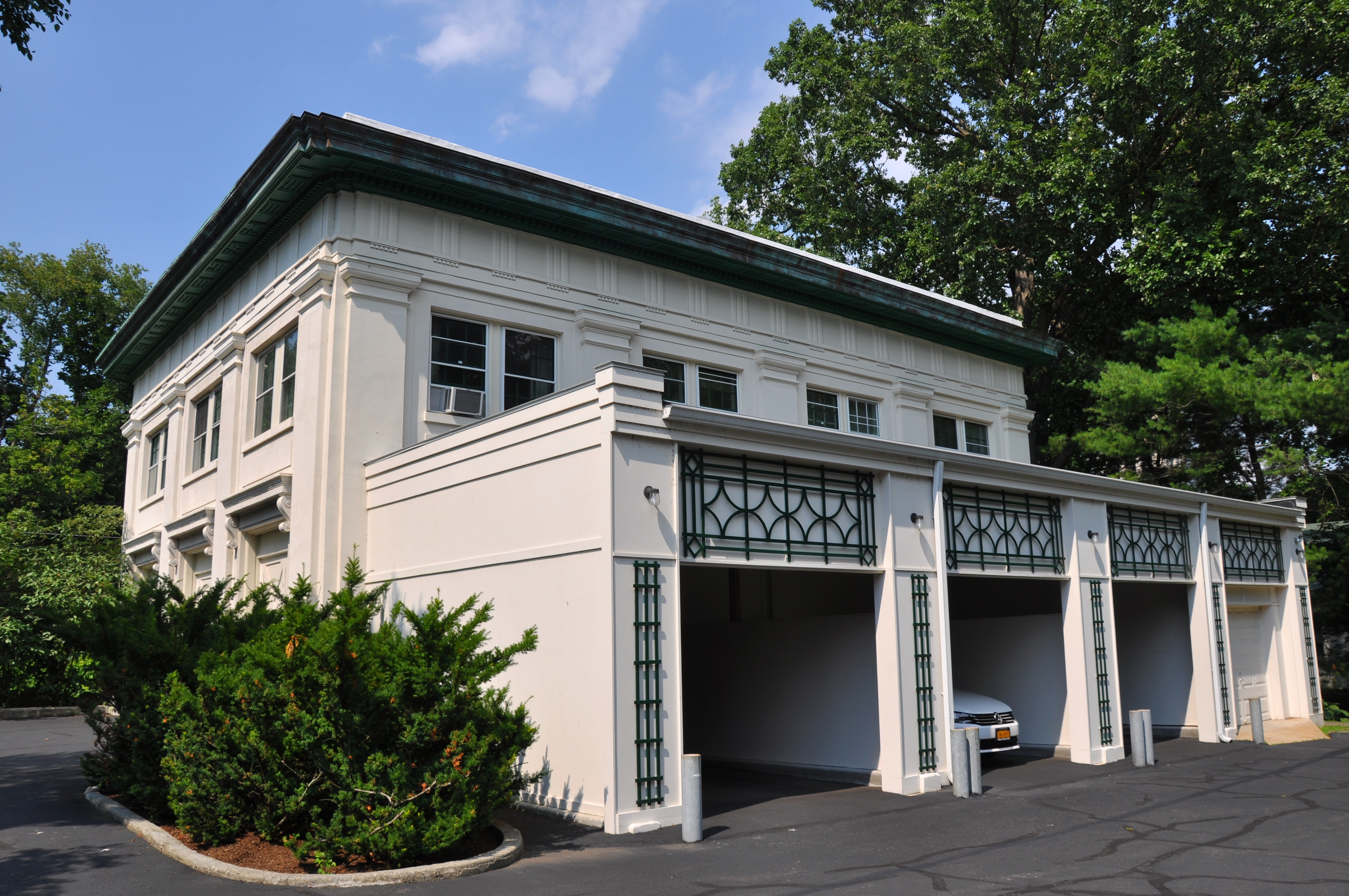
Beechwood's two-story seven-bay Art Deco garage

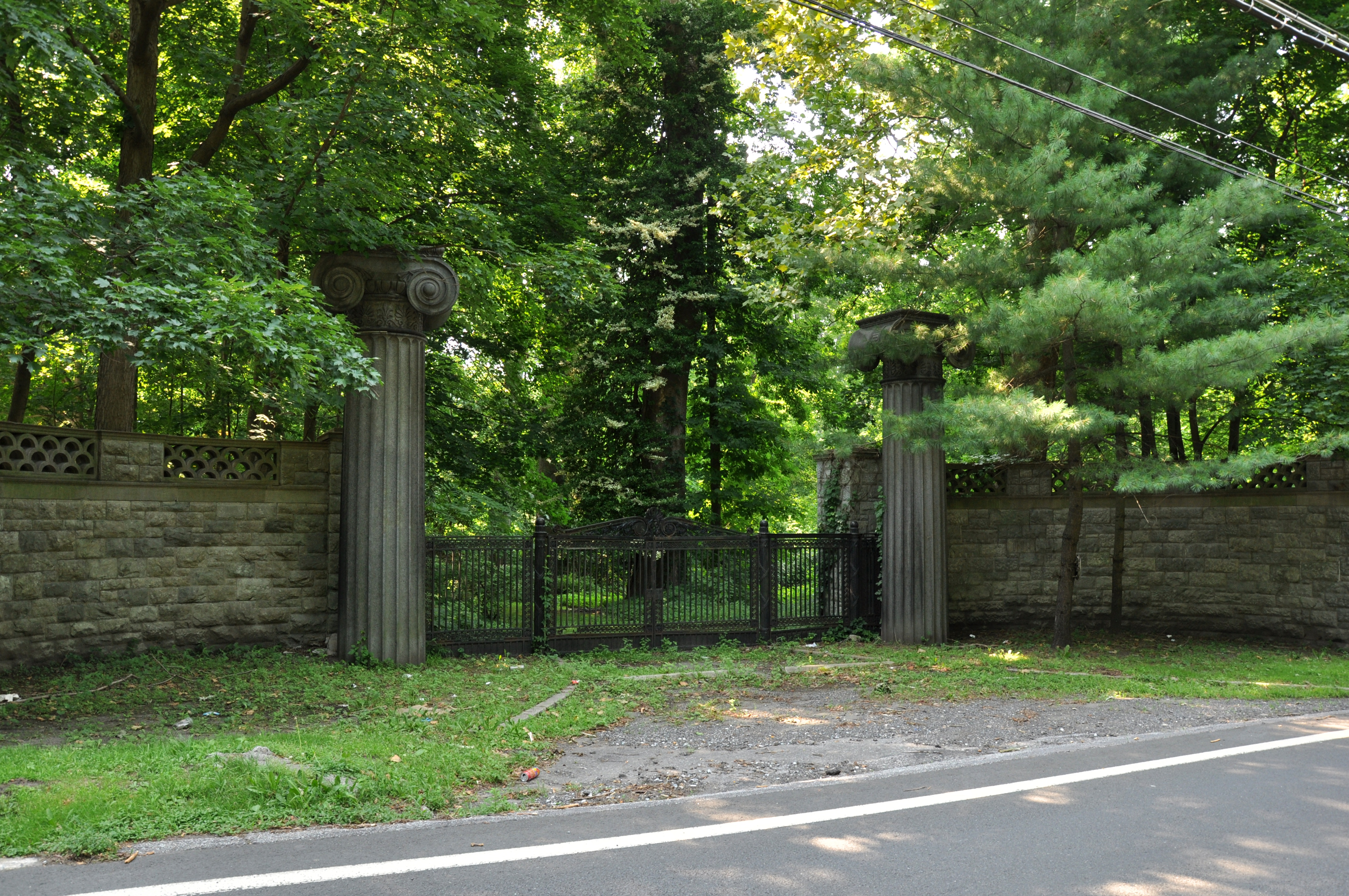
The former entranceway, designed by William Welles Bosworth

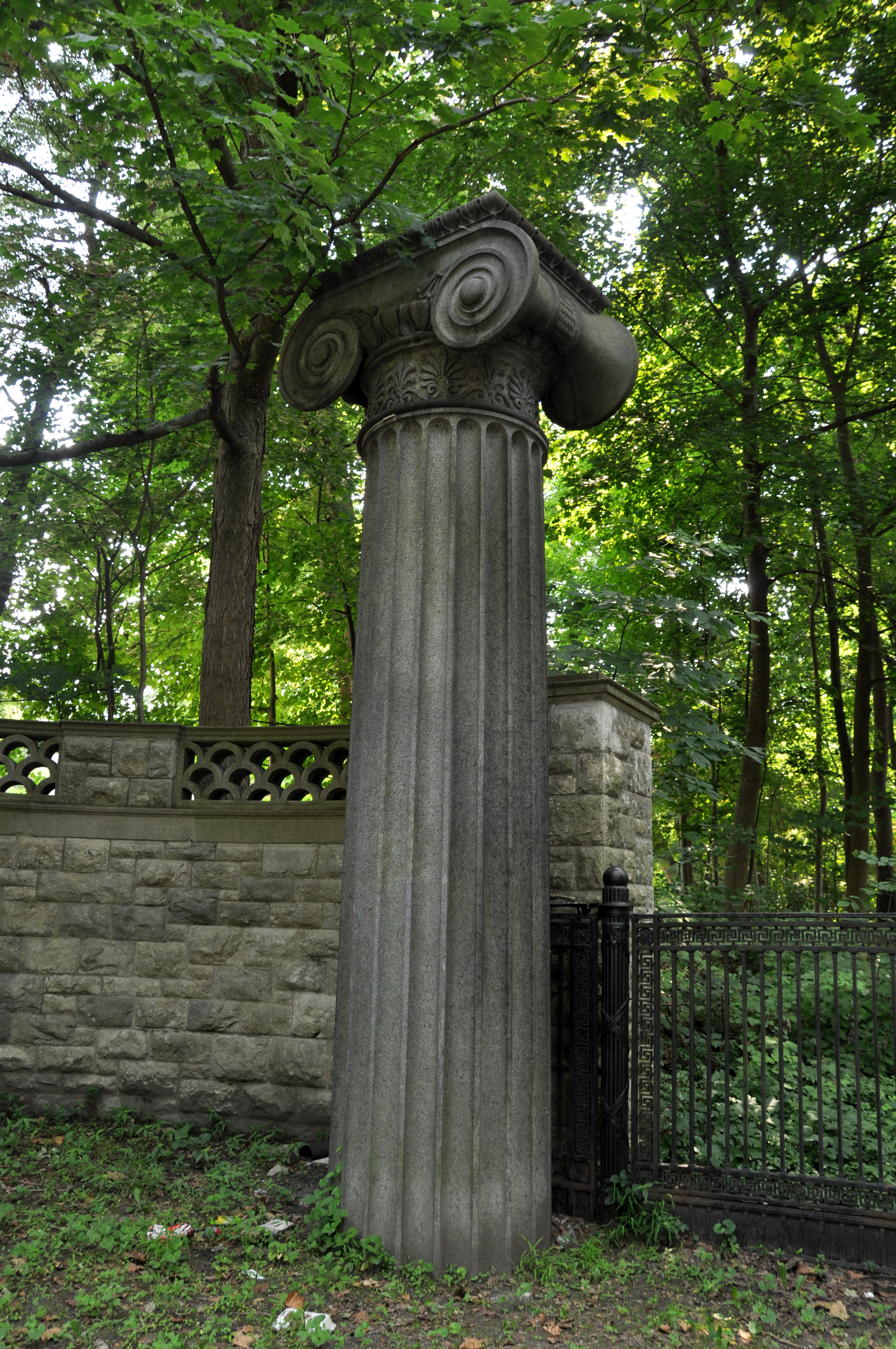
An Ionic column from 55 Wall Street

== See also ==
- Scarborough School
