= Frank A. Vanderlip =

American journalist (1864–1937)

Frank Arthur Vanderlip Sr.
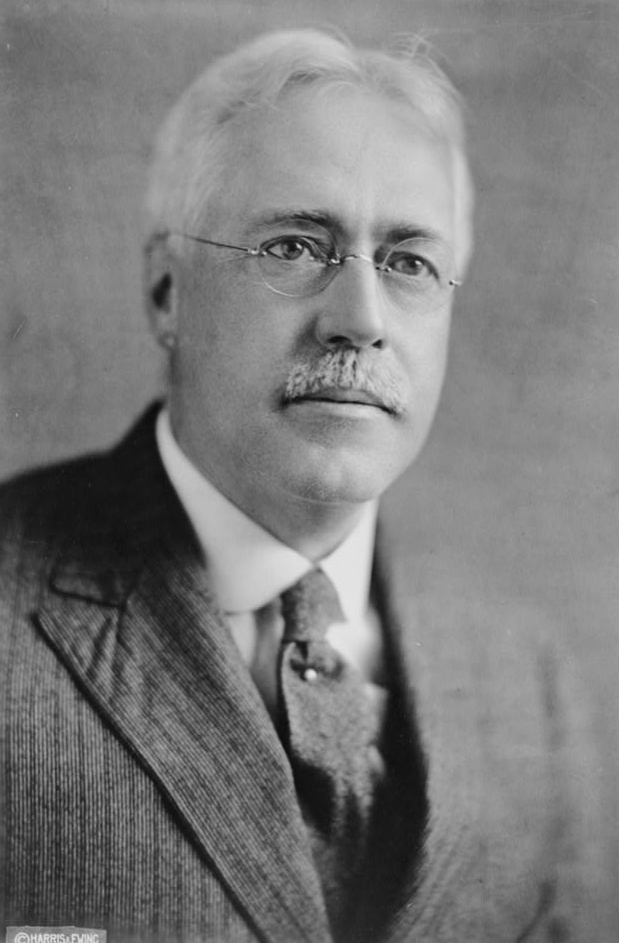

President of National City Bank
- In office 1909–1919
- Preceded by: James Jewett Stillman
- Succeeded by: Charles Edwin Mitchell

Assistant Secretary of the Treasury
- In office June 1, 1897 – March 5, 1901
- Appointed by: Scott Wike
- Preceded by: Milton E. Ailes

Personal details
- Born: November 13, 1864 Aurora, Illinois, U.S.
- Died: June 30, 1937 (aged 72) New York City, U.S.
- Spouse: Narcissa Cox Vanderlip (m. 1903)
- Children: 6
- Known for: Founding Father of Palos Verdes, California

Frank Arthur Vanderlip Sr. (November 17, 1864 – June 30, 1937) was an American banker and journalist. He was president of the National City Bank of New York (now Citibank) from 1909 to 1919, and Assistant Secretary of the Treasury from 1897 to 1901. Vanderlip is known for his part in founding the Federal Reserve System and for founding the first Montessori school in the United States, the Scarborough School and the group of communities in Palos Verdes, California.

Born in rural Illinois, Vanderlip worked in farms and factories until beginning a career in journalism in 1885. His efforts in financial journalism led him to become Assistant Secretary of the Treasury until the National City Bank hired him. While president of the bank, Vanderlip worked with the Jekyll Island group to develop a federal reserve; Vanderlip's later proposals also influenced the creation of the Federal Reserve System in 1913. His later life was focused towards developing Palos Verdes and creating the Scarborough School at his estate, Beechwood, in Briarcliff Manor, New York, as well as gentrifying the hamlet of Sparta, Ossining nearby. In addition, he helped found and was the first president of Sleepy Hollow Country Club. Vanderlip died in 1937 in New York Hospital, after weeks of treatment there.

== Early life ==
Frank Vanderlip was born on November 17, 1864, in Aurora, Illinois. Vanderlip was one of several children of Charles Edmond and Charlotte Louise Woodworth Vanderlip. His early life was spent on his family's farm in nearby Oswego, Illinois until his father died in 1878. After his death, Vanderlip, his mother, and his sister moved to Aurora, where he went to work at a lathe in a factory, at the age of 16. After one year at the University of Illinois and another job at the factory lathe, Vanderlip became city editor of the local newspaper, the Aurora Evening Post in 1885.

== Career ==
Under the guidance of economist Joseph French Johnson, Vanderlip took a position at a financial investigative service for stock investors in Chicago in 1886. Three years later, in 1889, he became a reporter for the Chicago Tribune, and was promoted to financial editor in 1892. While working for the newspaper, Vanderlip took an extension course in political economy at the newly founded University of Chicago. This brought him to the attention of Lyman J. Gage, who became Secretary of the Treasury under President William McKinley in 1897. Gage hired Vanderlip as his private secretary, six weeks before promoting him to Assistant Secretary of the Treasury. As directed by the War Revenue Act of 1898, Vanderlip was put in charge of sending out the $200 million bond issue to fund the Spanish–American War and procuring the subscriptions, with the special direction to offer the bonds to the smallest subscribers first, so that the public would feel invested in the fight. Vanderlip and his team of 600 to 700 clerks succeeded in selling out the bond issue in just over 30 days, closing out the bond drive on July 14, 1898. Vanderlip's success brought him to the attention of James Stillman, president of the National City Bank of New York, then the country's largest bank. Vanderlip became vice president in 1902, and was president from 1909 until 1919.

When the stock market and the financial system collapsed in the Panic of 1907, Vanderlip worked closely with other stable bankers, led by J. P. Morgan, to stop the depositors' run on banks that was leading to economic disaster. As part of an international economic relief response for the Panic of 1907, Vanderlip allied with top Japanese business leaders, hoping they could work together to stabilize the U.S. economy by increasing business and financial relations between their nations. He hoped this would also improve political relations between the U.S. and Japan. Based on these goals, in 1908, Vanderlip led a business U.S. delegation to Japan, where they met with Japanese business leaders, including Baron Shibusawa Eiichi, Baron Shibusawa's son Shibusawa Masao, Baron Dan Takuma, Taka Kawada, and Baron Mitsui Hachirōemon. This 1908 visit was the first official, modern day U.S. business delegation to visit Japan. The 1908 photo to the right presents Vanderlip during that 1908 visit.

The Panic of 1907 had a deep effect on the thinking of Vanderlip and others who were involved. In November 1910, at the invitation of Senator Nelson Aldrich, Vanderlip joined a small group of leading bankers on a train to Jekyll Island, Georgia, which later became known as the Jekyll Island group. The bankers formulated the outline to a plan that laid the groundwork for the drafting of the eventual Federal Reserve Act. In the final month and a half before the act's enactment on December 23, 1913, Vanderlip's alternative plan for a Federal Reserve Act nearly derailed the one that President Wilson and the Democratic leadership were promoting. Several of Vanderlip's ideas were incorporated into the final Federal Reserve Act.

After the Federal Reserve Act allowed national banks worth more than $1 million to be involved in the international market, Vanderlip and his vice president at National City Bank, Roger Leslie Farnham, plotted the takeover of the Bank of the Republic of Haiti through the United States occupation of Haiti, with initial plans beginning in 1909. Vanderlip wrote to Chairman of National City Bank James Stillman in 1910, "In the future, this stock will give us a foothold [in Haiti] and I think we will perhaps later undertake the reorganization of the Government’s currency system, which, I believe, I see my way clear to do with practically no monetary risk".

During the Teapot Dome scandal hearings in 1924, Vanderlip testified about what he believed to be a scandal during the administration of President Warren G. Harding. Because he spoke out vigorously in defense of the public's right to know about various issues, Vanderlip was forced to resign from the boards of directors of almost 40 companies. He subsequently led a quieter life at his homes in New York and California.

== Personal life and purchases ==
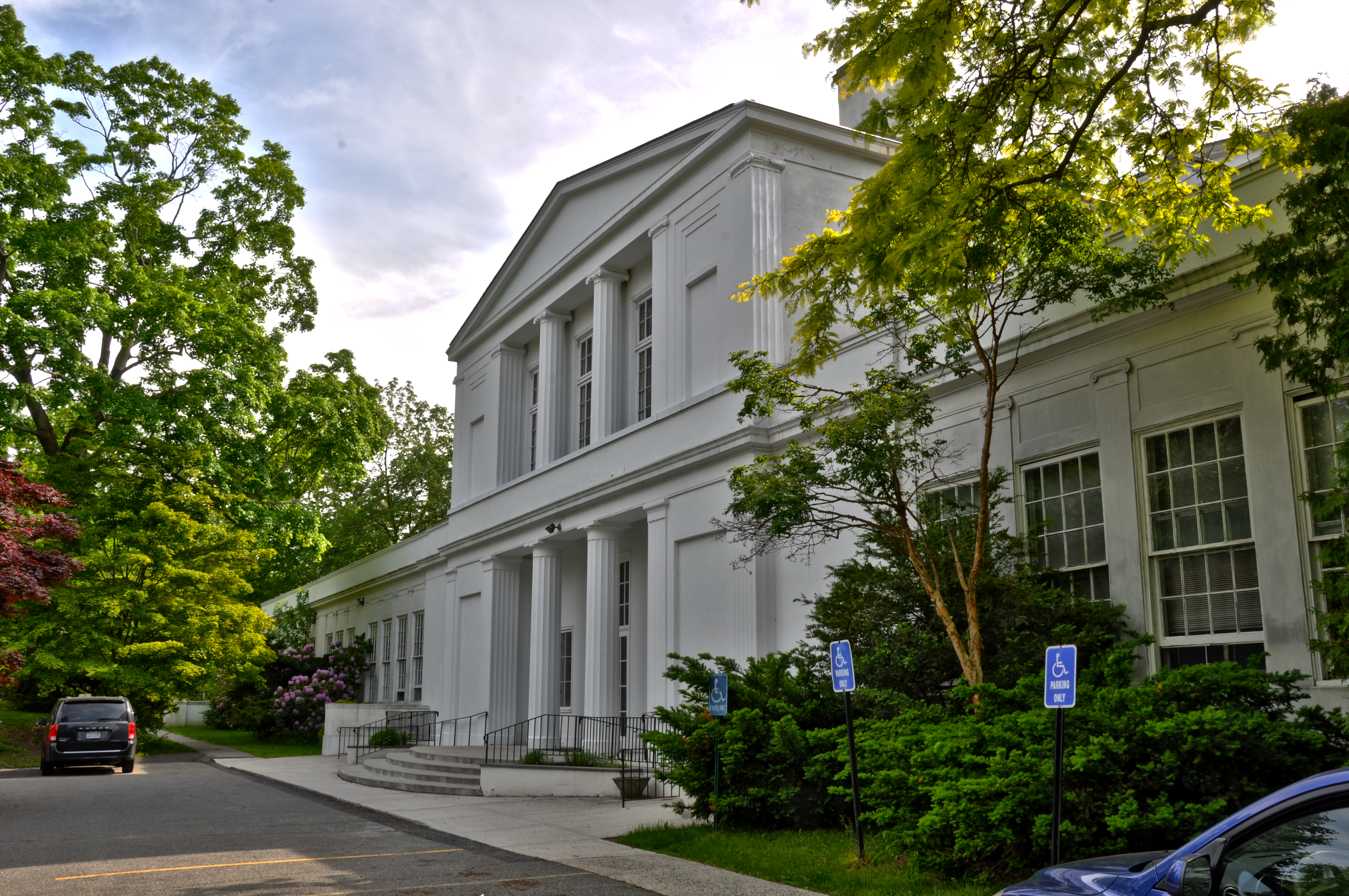
The Scarborough School in Scarborough, New York

On May 19, 1903, Vanderlip married Mabel Narcissa Cox (Narcissa Cox Vanderlip) in her home town of Chicago, Illinois. In 1905, they purchased Beechwood, on the Hudson in the hamlet of Scarborough, in Briarcliff Manor, New York. There they founded the Scarborough School, the first Montessori school in the US.

Vanderlip purchased several other large parcels, often along with other investors. The Vanderlip-Stillman-Tilghman syndicate bought 15,000 acres (6,100 ha) of land at the mouth of the Brazos River in Texas, in 1912, and founded the city of Freeport. After several smaller land investments, Vanderlip spearheaded a group that bought 16,000 acres (6,500 ha) now known collectively as Palos Verdes, California. Vanderlip, known as the "Father of Palos Verdes" purchased the 16,000 acres (6,500 ha) Rancho de los Palos Verdes from Jotham Bixby in 1913. In 1916, he built the Vanderlip estates near the Portuguese Bend area of Palos Verdes, California where some of his descendants still live. The Vanderlips helped develop landmarks in Rancho Palos Verdes, notably Wayfarers Chapel, Marineland of the Pacific, Portuguese Bend Riding Club, Portuguese Bend Beach Club, Nansen Field, Marymount College and Chadwick School. Vanderlip's original real estate sales office, La Venta, was the first building in the city of Palos Verdes Estates and is now listed as a historical landmark. His original purchase is now divided into four cities: Palos Verdes Estates, Rolling Hills Estates, Rolling Hills, and Rancho Palos Verdes.

His last major purchase was the hamlet of Sparta in Ossining, a quarter-mile from his Beechwood home. He bought about 70 homes and business buildings in 1920, believing it to be too run-down. Tearing down dilapidated homes, turning some to face the river, and moving at least one across the street, Vanderlip beautified and gentrified Sparta. Some of these buildings became homes for teachers at Scarborough School. The Vanderlips later gave land in Scarborough to one of their daughters, Narcissa, and her husband Julian Street Jr., for their family home, the Julian Street Jr. residence.

Vanderlip was hospitalized at the New York Hospital in June of 1937, where he died two weeks later on June 30.

== Legacy ==
Frank Vanderlip was an innovator in the world of banking. Besides being one of the founders of the Federal Reserve System, he led his bank to open the first overseas branches of an American bank, thus his bank became heavily involved in the American occupation of Haiti in 1915. He helped devise the war bond savings stamp program used in World Wars I and II, set up the first internship program to bring college students to work and study in the bank. He also worked to open up friendly business and personal relations with Japan in the 1920s.

His papers from 1890 to 1937 are stored at Columbia University.

Frank Vanderlip was awarded American Library Association Honorary Membership in 1919.

== Selected works ==
- Vanderlip, Frank A. The American "commercial invasion" of Europe. Republished from Scribner's Magazine, 1902. Retrieved November 16, 2016.
- Vanderlip, Frank A. What Happened to Europe (1920)
- Vanderlip, Frank A. What Next in Europe? (1922)
- Vanderlip, Frank A.; Sparkes, Boyden (February 9, 1935). "From Farm Boy to Financier: Stories of Railroad Moguls" (PDF). The Saturday Evening Post.

Business positions
Preceded by James Stillman	Chief of National City Bank; 1918–1919 (President with acting duties as Chairman)	Succeeded by James A. Stillman
