= Narcissa Cox Vanderlip =

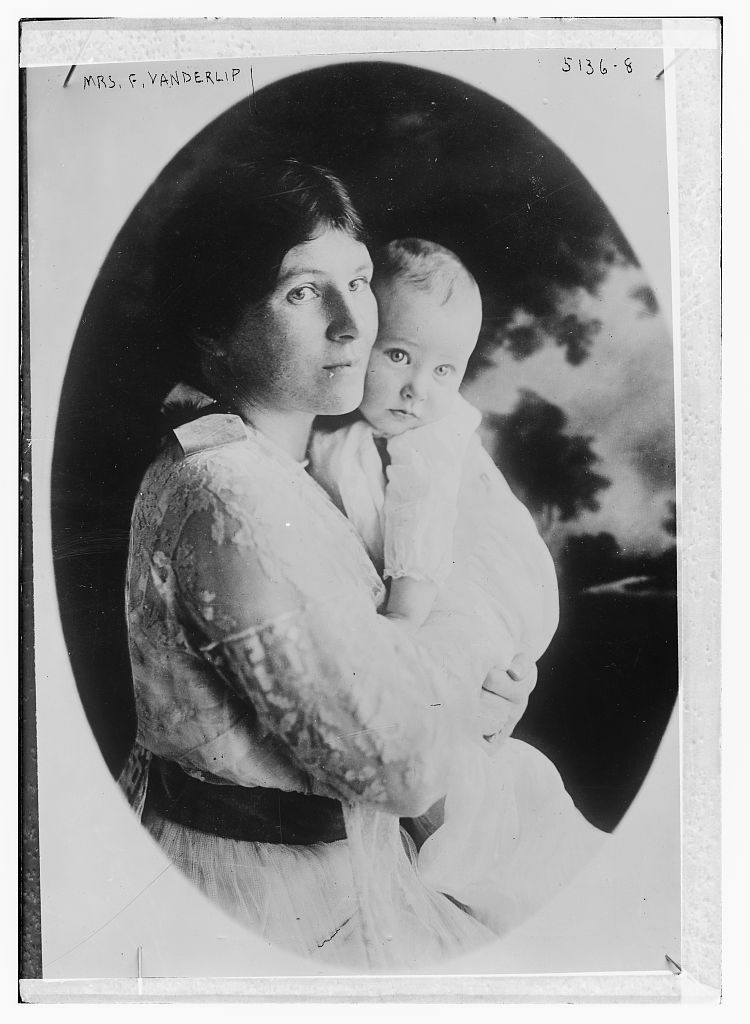
Narcissa Cox Vanderlip with a baby, c. 1920.

Narcissa Cox Vanderlip, née Mabel Narcissa Cox (1879-1966) was an American suffragist.

She attended the University of Chicago, but left in her senior year to get married. On May 19, 1903, she married Frank A. Vanderlip in her home town of Chicago, Illinois. In 1905, they purchased Beechwood, on the Hudson in the hamlet of Scarborough, in Briarcliff Manor, New York. In 1910, Frank bought the nearby mansion Woodlea, although Narcissa prevented the family from moving, due to her preference of Beechwood over the grandiose Woodlea. In Beachwood in 1913 Narcissa and Frank founded the Scarborough School, the first Montessori school in the U.S. The Vanderlips also helped develop landmarks in Rancho Palos Verdes, notably Wayfarers Chapel, Marineland of the Pacific, Portuguese Bend Riding Club, Portuguese Bend Beach Club, Nansen Field, Marymount College and Chadwick School. During World War I they traveled America selling bonds to aid the war effort. They had six children - Charlotte, Narcissa, Virginia, Frank Jr., Kelvin and John.

Narcissa was a leading New York suffragist and a co-founder of the New York State League of Women Voters. From 1919 to 1923 she chaired the New York State League of Women Voters. She also recruited Eleanor Roosevelt to join the League of Women Voters board of directors, having previously worked with her on wartime relief projects, and they were friends.

In 1929 she became the president of the New York Infirmary for Women and Children, which position she held for thirty-seven years.

A notable event associated with her concerns how, in 1934, Edward Bernays was asked to deal with women's apparent reluctance to buy Lucky Strikes because their green and red package clashed with standard female fashions. When Bernays suggested changing the package to a neutral color, George Washington Hill, head of the American Tobacco Company, refused, saying that he had already spent millions advertising the package. Bernays then endeavored to make green a fashionable color. The centerpiece of his efforts was the Green Ball, a social event at the Waldorf Astoria, hosted by Narcissa. The pretext for the ball and its unnamed underwriter was that proceeds would go to charity. Famous society women would attend wearing green dresses. Manufacturers and retailers of clothing and accessories were advised of the excitement growing around the color green. Intellectuals were enlisted to give highbrow talks on the theme of green. Before the ball had actually taken place, newspapers and magazines (encouraged in various ways by Bernays's office) had latched on to the idea that green was all the rage.
