= The Goat (TV series) =

American reality television series

- Starring: Daniel Tosh
- Country of origin: United States
- Original language: English
- No. of seasons: 1
- No. of episodes: 10

Production
- Executive producer: Ben Silverman
- Production company: Amazon Studios

Original release
- Network: Amazon Prime Video; Amazon Freevee
- Release: May 9 – June 27, 2024

The Goat is an American reality television series hosted by Daniel Tosh. It premiered on Amazon Prime Video and Amazon Freevee on May 9, 2024.

== Summary ==
A selection of reality show veterans compete to earn $200,000 and the title of "The Greatest Reality Show Contestant of All Time".

== Contestants ==
Cast member	Original series	Finish
Paola Mayfield	90 Day Fiancé 1	Winner
Joe Amabile	The Bachelorette 14	Runner-up
Jason Smith	Food Network Star 13	Third place
Jill Zarin	The Real Housewives of New York City	Episode 10
Da'Vonne Rogers	Big Brother 17	Episode 9
C.J. Franco	FBoy Island	Episode 8
Wendell Holland	Survivor: Ghost Island	Episode 7
Reza Farahan	Shahs of Sunset	Episode 6
Justin Johnson a.k.a. Alyssa Edwards	RuPaul's Drag Race 5	Episode 5
Teck Holmes	The Real World: Hawaii	Episode 5
Kristen Doute	Vanderpump Rules	Episode 4
Lauren Speed-Hamilton	Love Is Blind 1	Episode 3
Tayshia Adams	The Bachelor 23	Episode 2
Joey Sasso	The Circle 1	Episode 1

== Voting history ==
Episode	1	2	3	4	5 (Note: In Episode 5, there was a double elimination, with the two contestants receiving the highest number of votes being exiled.)	6	7	8	9	10	
The Goat	Tayshia	CJ	Da'Vonne	Wendell	Da'Vonne	Jill	Joe	Da'Vonne	Paola	(none)	
Nominated/ Losing Team	Jason; Joey; Jill; Kristen; Lauren; Paola; Wendell	Da'Vonne; Joe; Justin; Paola; Tayshia	CJ; Jill; Justin; Lauren; Paola	Justin; Kristen; Paola; Reza; Teck	Joe; Justin; Paola; Teck	CJ; Joe; Paola; Reza	Jill; Wendell	CJ; Joe	Da'Vonne; Joe	(none)	
Vote	8–7 (Note: In Episode 1, the vote ended in a tie, prompting Tayshia, the GOAT, to publicly break the tie with her deciding vote.)	10–3	7–5	8–3	4–3–2–1	5–3	6–1	5–1	3-2	(none)	
Paola	Not; Shown	Tayshia	Justin	Kristen	Not; Shown	Reza	Wendell	CJ	Da'Vonne	No vote	Winner (Episode 10)
Joe	Not; Shown	Tayshia	Lauren	Kristen	Not; Shown	Reza	Wendell	CJ	Da'Vonne	No vote	Runner-up (Episode 10)
Jason	Joey	Tayshia	Lauren	Kristen	Teck	Reza	Wendell	CJ	Da'Vonne	No vote	Third place (Episode 10)
Jill	Joey	Tayshia	Justin	Reza	Justin	Reza	Wendell	CJ	Joe	Exiled (Episode 10)	Paola; 10 votes Joe; 1 vote
Da'Vonne	Not; Shown	Joe	Justin	Reza	Not; Shown	Reza	Wendell	CJ	Joe	Exiled (Episode 9)	Paola; 10 votes Joe; 1 vote
CJ	Not; Shown	Joe	Lauren	Kristen	Not; Shown	Joe	Wendell	Joe	Exiled (Episode 8)		Paola; 10 votes Joe; 1 vote
Wendell	Not; Shown	Tayshia	Lauren	Kristen	Joe	Joe	Jill	Exiled (Episode 7)			Paola; 10 votes Joe; 1 vote
Reza	Joey	Tayshia	Lauren	Kristen	Paola	Joe	Exiled (Episode 6)				Paola; 10 votes Joe; 1 vote
Justin	Not; Shown	Tayshia	Lauren	Kristen	Not; Shown	Exiled (Episode 5)					Paola; 10 votes Joe; 1 vote
Teck	Not; Shown	Tayshia	Lauren	Kristen	Not; Shown	Exiled (Episode 5)					Paola; 10 votes Joe; 1 vote
Kristen	Jason	Tayshia	Justin	Reza	Exiled (Episode 4)						Paola; 10 votes Joe; 1 vote
Lauren	Not; Shown	Tayshia	Justin	Exiled (Episode 3)							Paola; 10 votes Joe; 1 vote
Tayshia	Jason; Joey	Joe	Exiled (Episode 2)								Paola; 10 votes Joe; 1 vote
Joey	Jason	Exiled (Episode 1)									Paola; 10 votes Joe; 1 vote

== Production ==
Season 1 of The Goat was filmed in early 2023 in Georgia.

== Reception ==
Initial reviews were mixed, with some reviewers making unfavorable comparisons to House of Villains. Others found its winking send-ups of reality conventions to be quite humorous.

== Release ==
The first 3 episodes of the series premiered on Prime Video and Freevee on May 9, 2024. Subsequent episodes were released on Thursdays through June 27, 2024. The first season is 10 episodes.

== Episodes ==
No.	Title	Original release date
1	"Let the GOAT Games Begin"	May 9, 2024
2	"GOAT Blowback"	May 9, 2024
3	"Casualty of War"	May 9, 2024
4	"The Hurricane"	May 16, 2024
5	"Two for the Price of One"	May 23, 2024
6	"Bravo Breakdown"	May 30, 2024
7	"Every GOAT for Themselves"	June 6, 2024
8	"Catwalk Calamity"	June 13, 2024
9	"The Thinning of the Herd"	June 20, 2024
10	"The GOAT of Goats"	June 27, 2024
