= Briarcliff Manor Union Free School District =

School district in Briarcliff Manor, New York

Location
- 45 Ingham Road, Briarcliff Manor, New York, US
- Coordinates: 41.1480°N 73.8174°W

District information
- Type: Public
- Grades: K–12
- Superintendent: James M. Kaishian
- Asst. superintendent(s): Edgar MacIntosh, Linda Peters
- Schools: Todd Elementary School; Briarcliff Middle School; Briarcliff High School
- Budget: $50,335868 (2016-17)
- NCES District ID: 3605340

Students and staff
- Students: 1,535 (2011–2012)
- Teachers: 139.95 (on full-time equivalent basis, 2011–2012)
- Staff: 247 (2011–2012)
- Student–teacher ratio: 11.48 (2011–2012)

Other information
- Website: www.briarcliffschools.org

The Briarcliff Manor Union Free School District is the public school district of Briarcliff Manor, New York, United States. The district is an independent public entity, and is governed by the district Board of Education, whose members are elected in non-partisan elections for staggered, three-year terms. The board selects a superintendent, who is the district's chief administrative official. The district's offices are located in Todd Elementary School.

The district has three schools: Todd Elementary School, Briarcliff Middle School and Briarcliff High School. It has about 1,535 students, and spends an average of $24,858 per pupil and has a student–teacher ratio of 11:1 (the national averages are $12,435 and 15.3:1 respectively). The district is a part of the Putnam-Northern Westchester Board of Cooperative Educational Services. The Briarcliff Manor UFSD won first place for the small district category of the 2008 Digital School Districts Survey and currently provided 1 to 1 devices to all students in grades 4 through 12.

== History ==
In 1865, a one-room schoolhouse was built on land donated by John Whitson on the south side of Pleasantville Road, between the Pocantico River and the New York & Putnam Railroad (now NY Route 9A/100). The building (Whitson's School, District No. 6) became the first schoolhouse in the area. George A. Todd, Jr. was the first teacher and superintendent of the school. In 1867, the school was moved to the White School, named thus due to its exterior paint.

Early schools
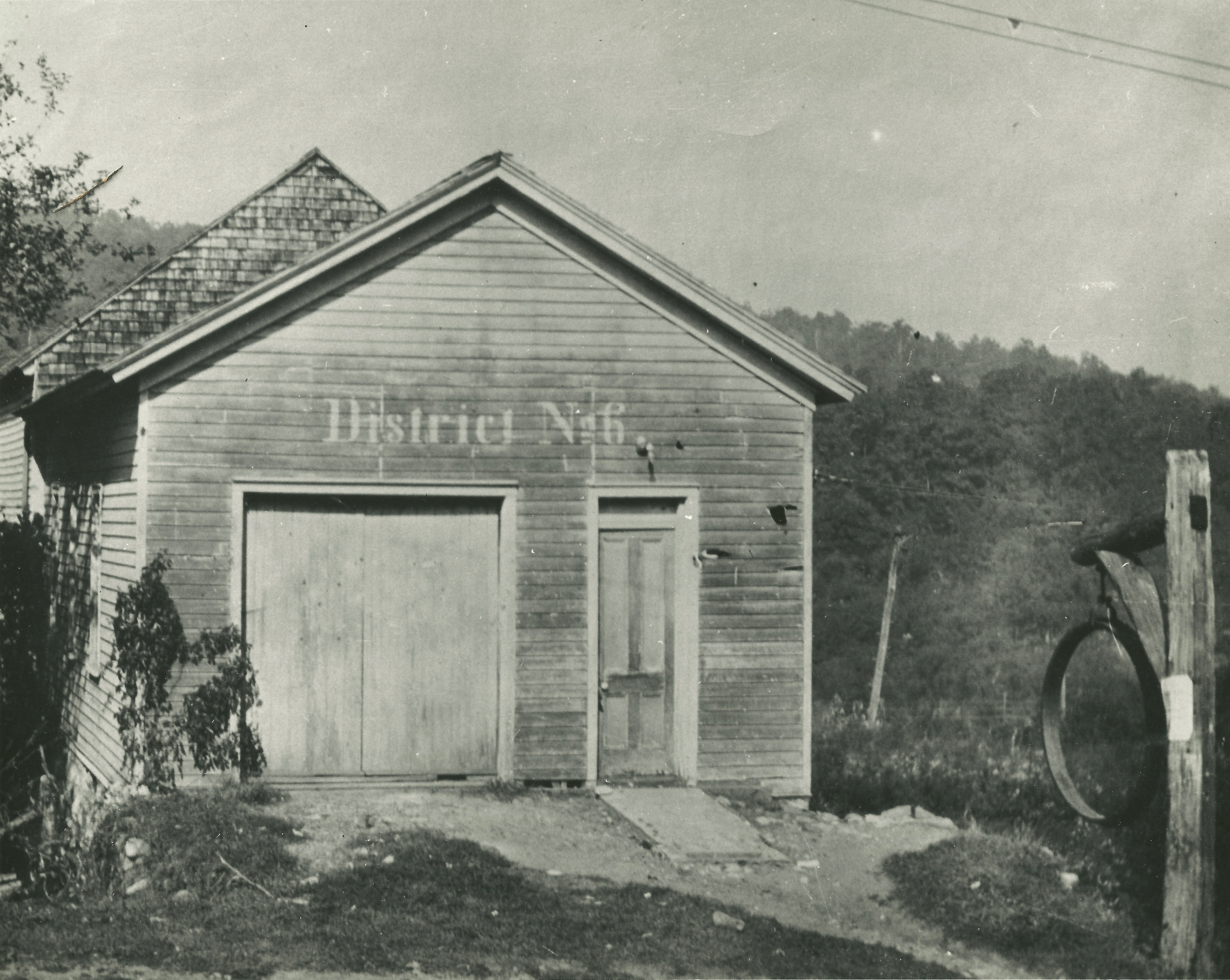
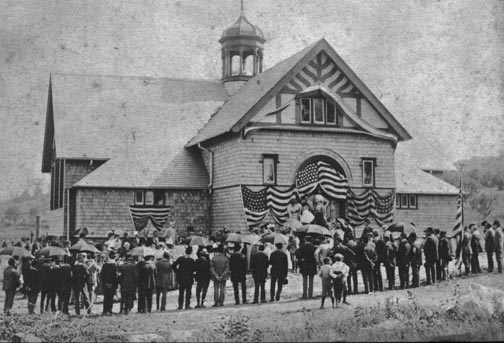
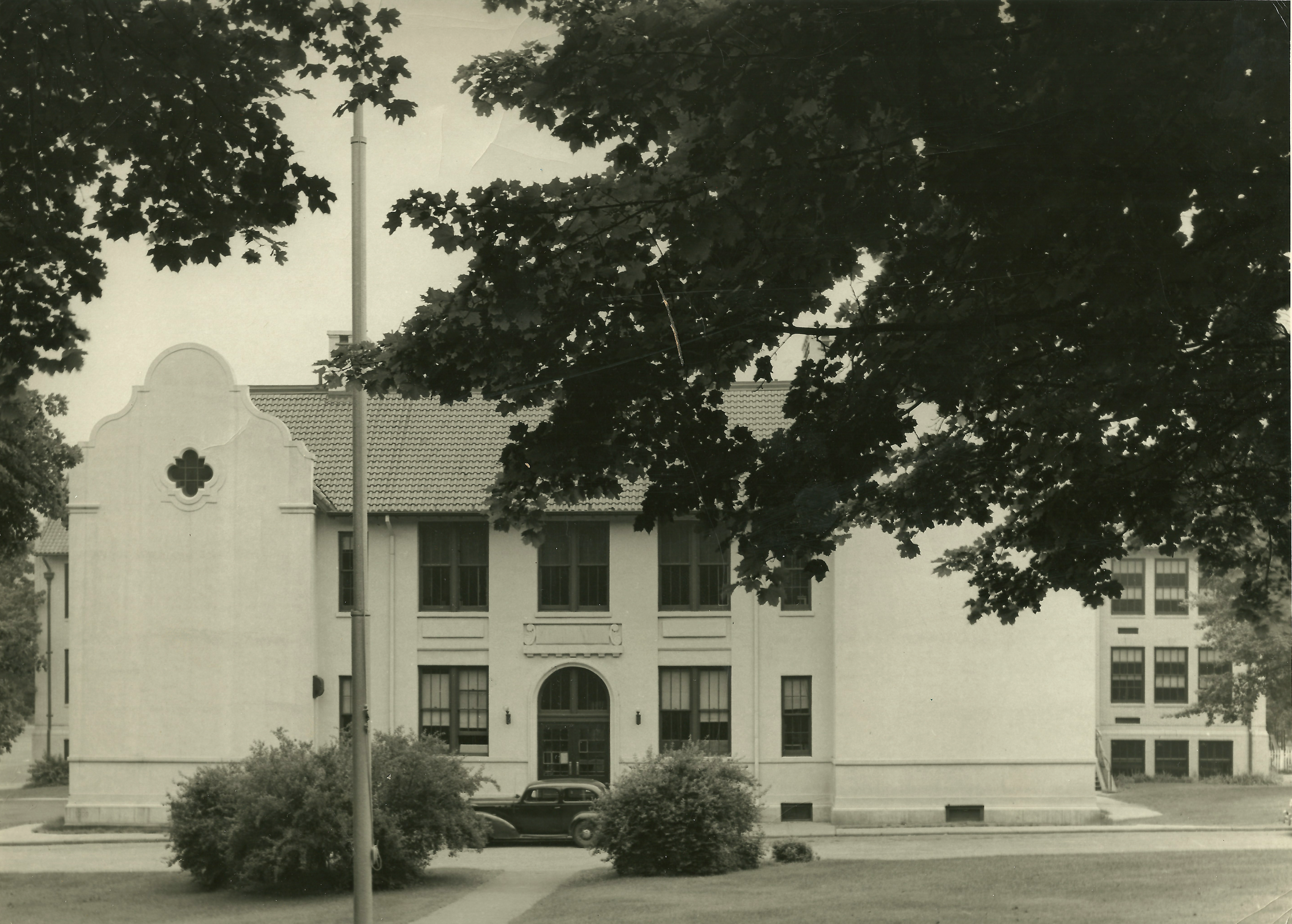
Whitson's School, District No. 6; Briarcliff Public School at its 1898 opening; Briarcliff Grade School ca. 1930
2014 field replacement
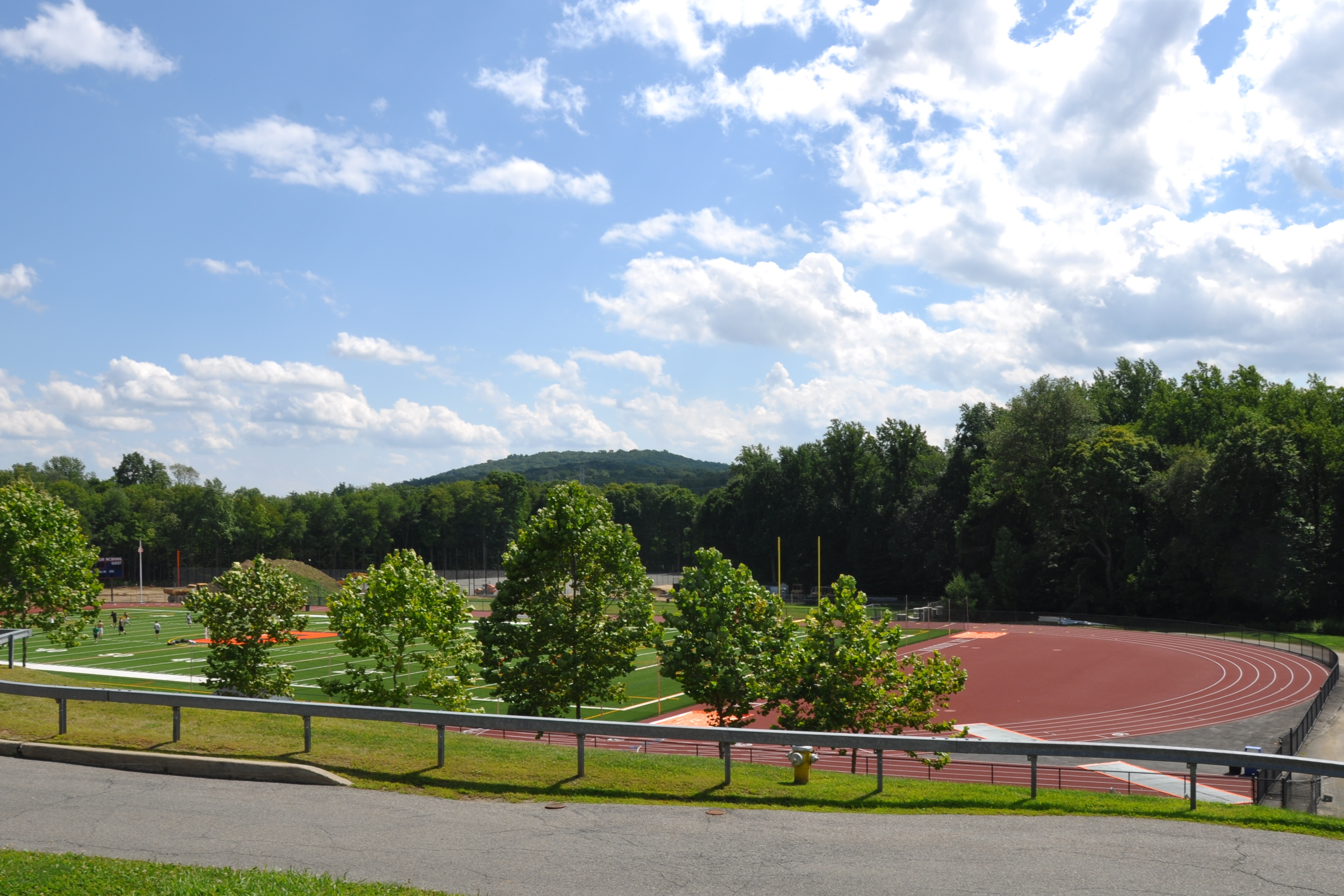
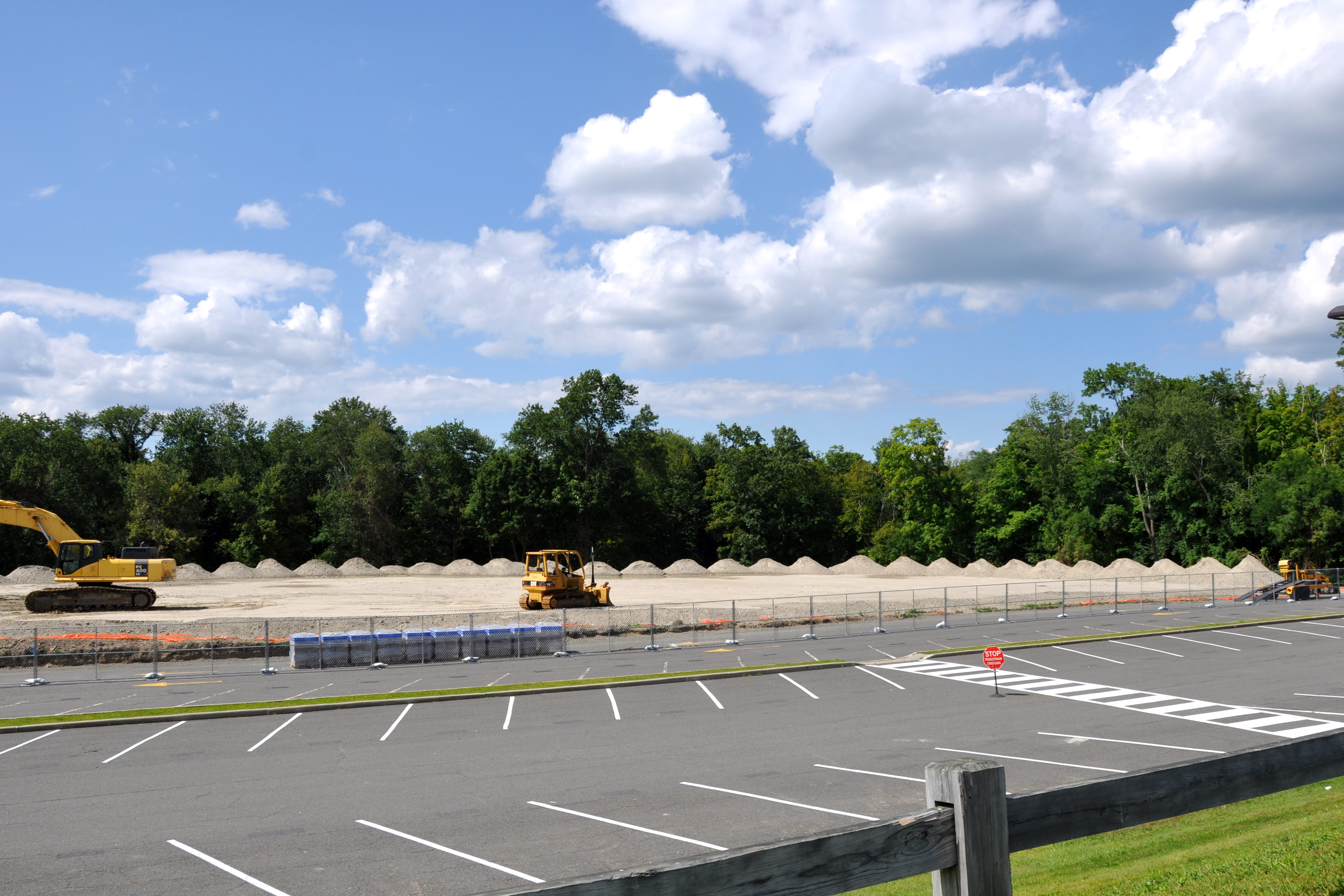
The middle and high school campus' football field and track were replaced in 2014; the baseball and softball fields are under construction.

Its replacement building, Briarcliff Public School, was built in 1898 on the site of the White School. The building failed to meet requirements set by New York's commissioner of education, and thus in 1910, it became the Briarcliff Community Center, a social organization established by the village. (Note: The organization ceased to exist in 1927; the building burned down in 1928, shortly after scheduled demolition to make way for the Briarcliff–Peekskill Parkway.) Around the same time, in 1908, $50,000 ($1.79 million in 2025) was voted for Briarcliff Manor to buy a plot by Law Memorial Park, and the school moved again, to the Spanish Renaissance-style Grade School building, which was built there the following year. Students would attend that school from kindergarten to ninth grade and have the option to then attend the nearby Ossining High School. In 1918, the Briarcliff school began educating students through high school; in 1928, a dedicated wing for high school students was built onto the Grade School building. The enlarged school accepted students from Croton, Hawthorne, North White Plains, Valhalla, and as far as Granite Springs.

In 1953, Todd Elementary School opened to free space at the Law Park grade school for middle- and high-school students. The present high school opened in 1971 to ease the large enrollment at the Grade School building. The district under its current name was officially established in 1974.

In 1980, Pace University began leasing the middle school building, and the middle school was moved to a portion of the new high school building. The Grade School building was demolished in 1996, and a retirement home was built on its site the following year. In the early 2000s, the current Briarcliff Middle School was constructed adjoining to the high school. The wing was completed in 2003 at a cost of $24 million ($42 million in 2025) in the same red-brick-and-glass style as the high school wing. In 2008, the school district won first place for the small district category of that year's Digital School Districts Survey.

=== Supreme Court loan ===
In the 1970s, the school district made an indefinite loan of four sculptures to the U.S. Supreme Court. The works, plaster frieze reliefs designed and sculpted by Adolph Weinman in the 1930s, were models for Weinman's final marble panels that were installed in the Supreme Courtroom in 1935. The models are six inches tall and two feet wide, compared with the 7-foot-tall final products.

Weinman's son, Robert Weinman, donated the models to the school district in the late 1950s; Weinman was a resident of Briarcliff, and his children attended school in the district. The Supreme Court curator had contacted Robert Weinman seeking any models; Weinman directed him to the school district. The models were being kept in the basement of the former middle school, and were moved to the lobby of the Supreme Court Building in 1974, where they have been on display since.

The court's curator sought out the district to donate the pieces around 2010, as part of a larger effort for donation or sale of works on loan to the Supreme Court. The school board had the pieces insured and voted to keep the models in the district's ownership, with a renewable annual lease to the court; as the work's tie to Briarcliff is valued in the district. The district is the only school to have a loan agreement with the Supreme Court.

== General information ==
Former logo of the school district

Composition (2015–16)
- White: 76%
- Asian/Pacific Islander: 13%
- Hispanic: 7%
- Black: 3%
- American Indian/Alaska Native: 0%
- Multiracial: 2%

Source: The New York State Report Card, NYSED

The three schools within the district serve about 1,535 students, and the district spends an average of $24,858 per pupil; its student–teacher ratio is 11:1 (the national averages are $12,435 and 15.3:1 respectively). Demand for entrance to the school is high due to its strong performance and ratings.

=== Location and area ===
The Briarcliff Manor UFSD covers 6.58 square miles (17.0 km^{2}) of land and most of the village of Briarcliff Manor. The district also serves an unincorporated portion of the town of Mount Pleasant. Parts of Briarcliff Manor not covered by the school district include Scarborough and Chilmark; these areas (about 28 percent of Briarcliff Manor) are part of the Ossining Union Free School District.

=== Demographics ===
In the 2015–16 school year, the Briarcliff Manor Union Free School District enrolled approximately 1,469 students; of which 16 (1 percent) were eligible for free lunch and 6 students were eligible for reduced-price lunch. The student body is 52% male and 48% female. One percent of students are economically disadvantaged and nine percent have reported disabilities.

Enrollment in the Briarcliff Manor Union Free School District since 1867

Year	Enroll.	±% p.a.
1867	35	—
1905	108	+3.01%
1912	176	+7.23%
1926	273	+3.19%
1939	350	+1.93%
1976–1977	1,324	+3.66%

Year	Enroll.	±% p.a.
1987–1988	972	−2.77%
1988–1989	1,024	+5.35%
1998–1999	1,401	+3.18%
1999–2000	1,464	+4.50%
2000–2001	1,593	+8.81%
2001–2002	1,651	+3.64%

Year	Enroll.	±% p.a.
2002–2003	1,728	+4.66%
2003–2004	1,750	+1.27%
2004–2005	1,802	+2.97%
2005–2006	1,836	+1.89%
2006–2007	1,781	−3.00%
2007–2008	1,701	−4.49%

Year	Enroll.	±% p.a.
2008–2009	1,744	+2.53%
2009–2010	1,687	−3.27%
2010–2011	1,651	−2.13%
2011–2012	1,640	−0.67%
2012–2013	1,573	−4.09%
2013–2014	1,568	−0.32%

Year	Enroll.	±% p.a.
2014–2015	1,522	−2.93%
2015–2016	1,469	−3.48%

- 1867
- 1905, 1912, 1926, 1939
- 1976–1977
- 1987–1989
- 1998–2000
- 2000–2006
- 2006–2007
- 2007–2008
- 2008–2014
- 2014–2016

== Schools ==
=== Todd Elementary School ===
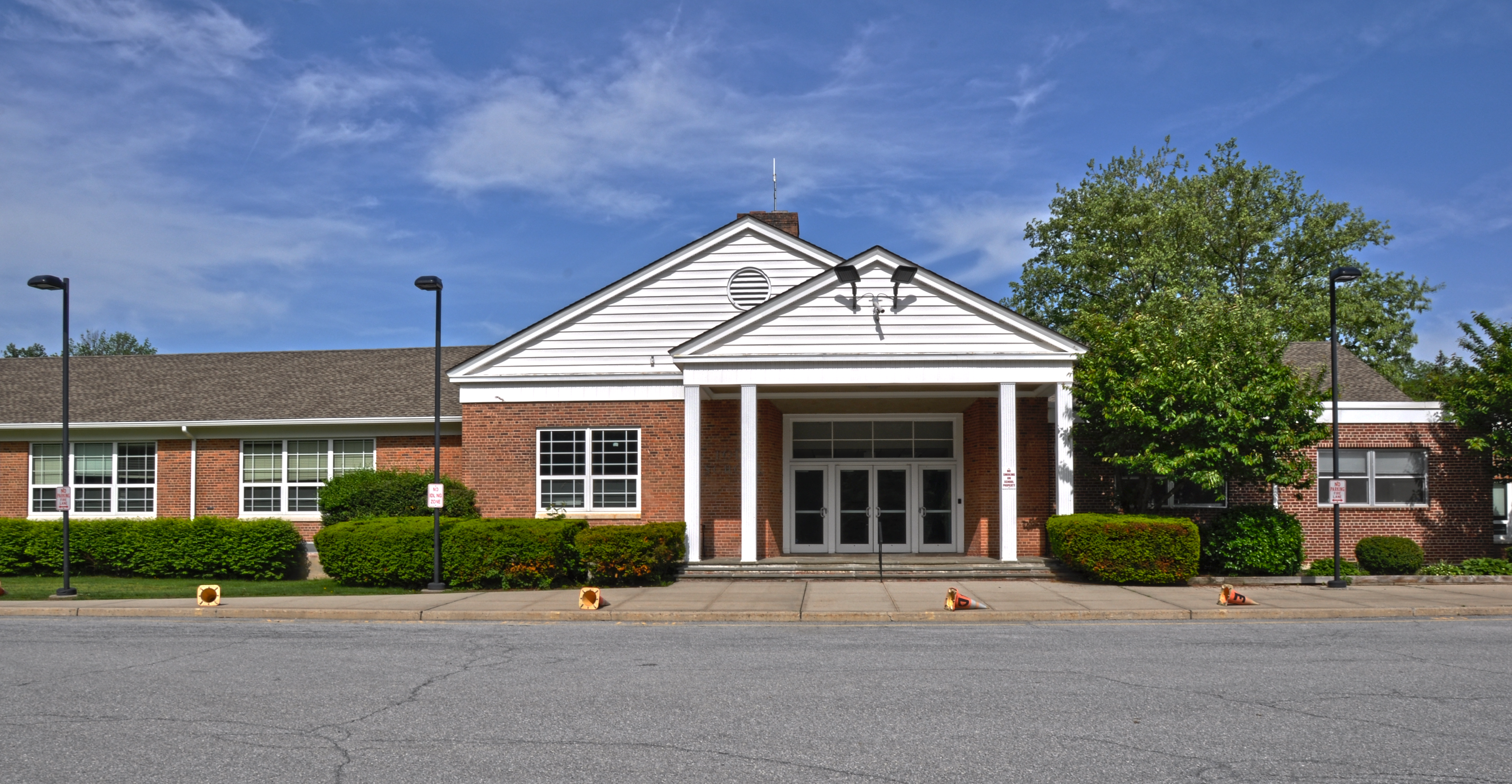
Todd Elementary School

Todd Elementary School serves students from kindergarten through to fifth grade. The current elementary school building opened in 1953 and is named after George A. Todd, Jr. who was the village's first teacher, first superintendent and taught for over 40 years. When it opened, the school was already too small; two more rooms were added. In 1956, another addition nearly doubled the school's size. In 2000, another expansion of the school began, creating distinct wings for students in kindergarten to second grade and students in third to fifth grade. It became a Blue Ribbon school in 2016.

=== Briarcliff Middle School ===
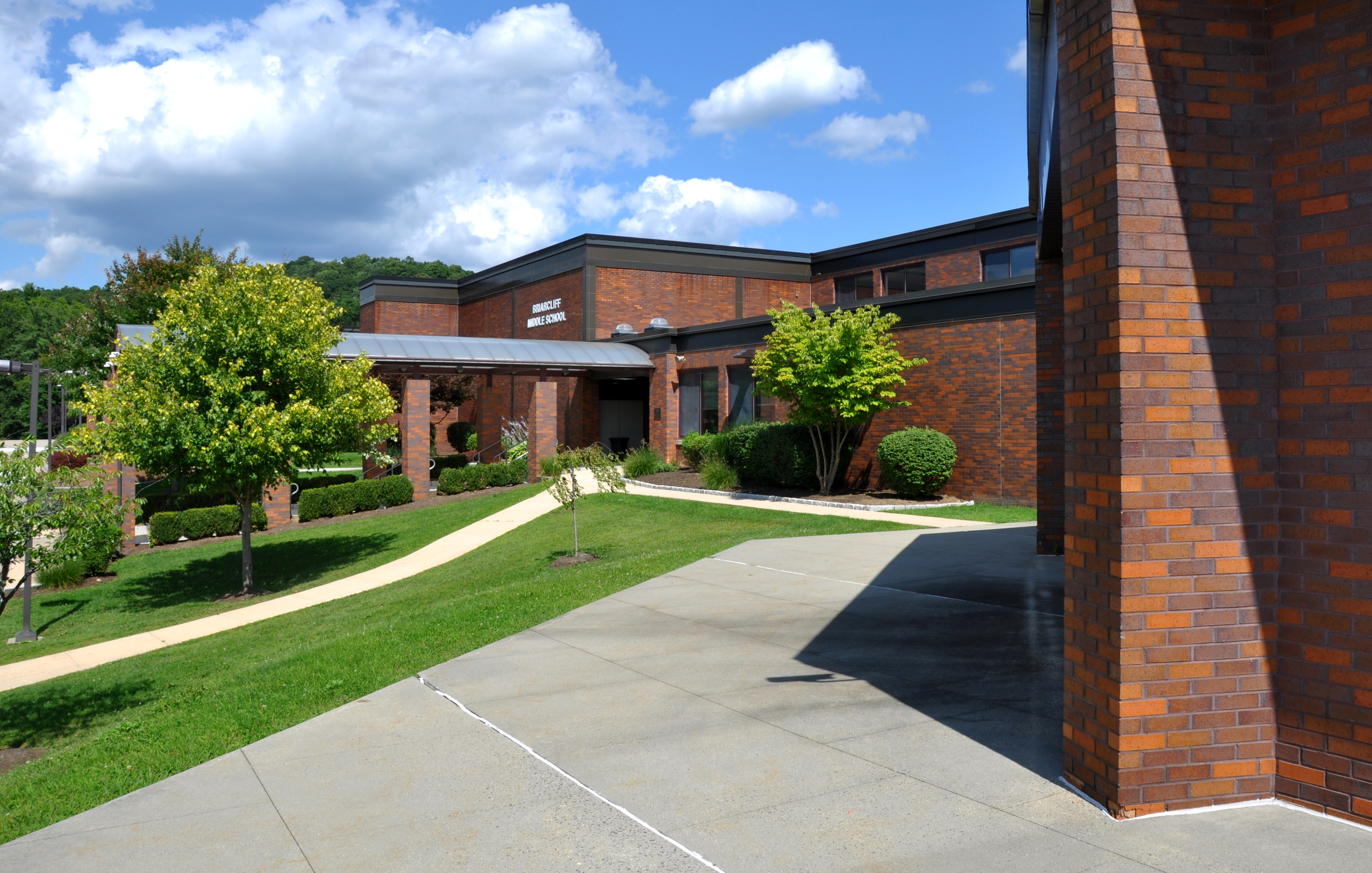
Briarcliff Middle School

Briarcliff Middle School (BMS) serves students in grades 6–8. It is co-located on a suburban campus with Briarcliff High School. The school principal is Susan Howard. The school has 62 faculty members, including 29 teaching staff. As of January 2012, enrollment is 379. It became a Blue Ribbon school in 2005.

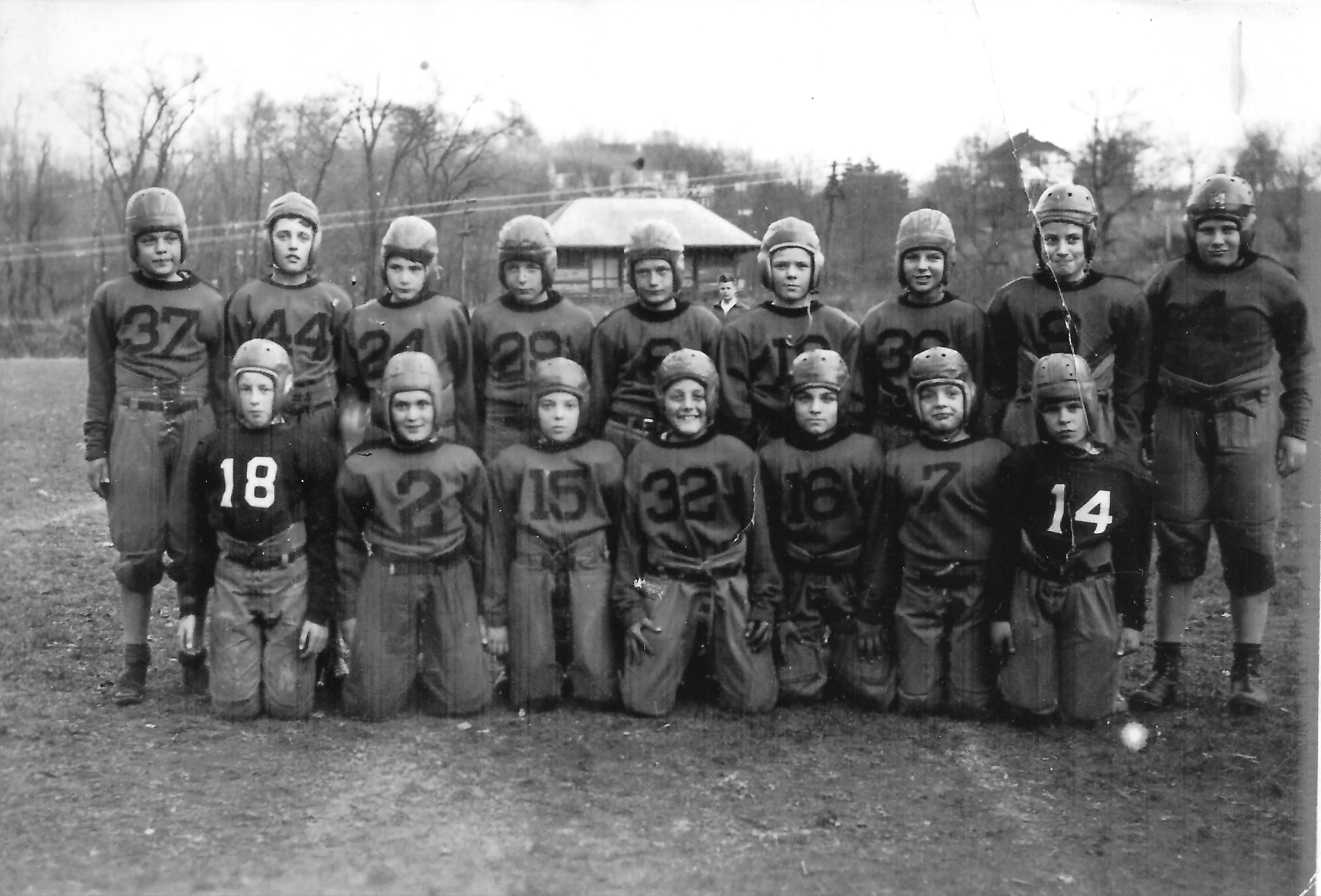
BMS eighth grade football team ca. 1938

==== Student body ====
The student body consists primarily of incoming students from Todd Elementary School. Fewer than 3 percent qualify for free or reduced lunches; in contrast, 72 percent of the student body qualifies in nearby New York City.

The demographics of the school are 92 percent White (non-Hispanic), 2 percent Black or African American, 4 percent Asian, and 2 percent Hispanic or Latino. Its student–teacher ratio is 11:1.

The school runs the Greenhouse Club, which donated to charities, fixed old laptops, and started a recycling and composting program. The club runs an annual Charity: Water fundraiser, and has held coat drives, collected funds for Hurricane Sandy victims, and organized a holiday boutique to raise money for the American Cancer Society. As well, the students of the club have helped to create and maintain Academia, the school's outdoor education center, greenhouse and garden built around 2008. The club also created a five-part video miniseries on planting and gardening for instructional use at Hawthorne Country Day School.

=== Briarcliff High School ===
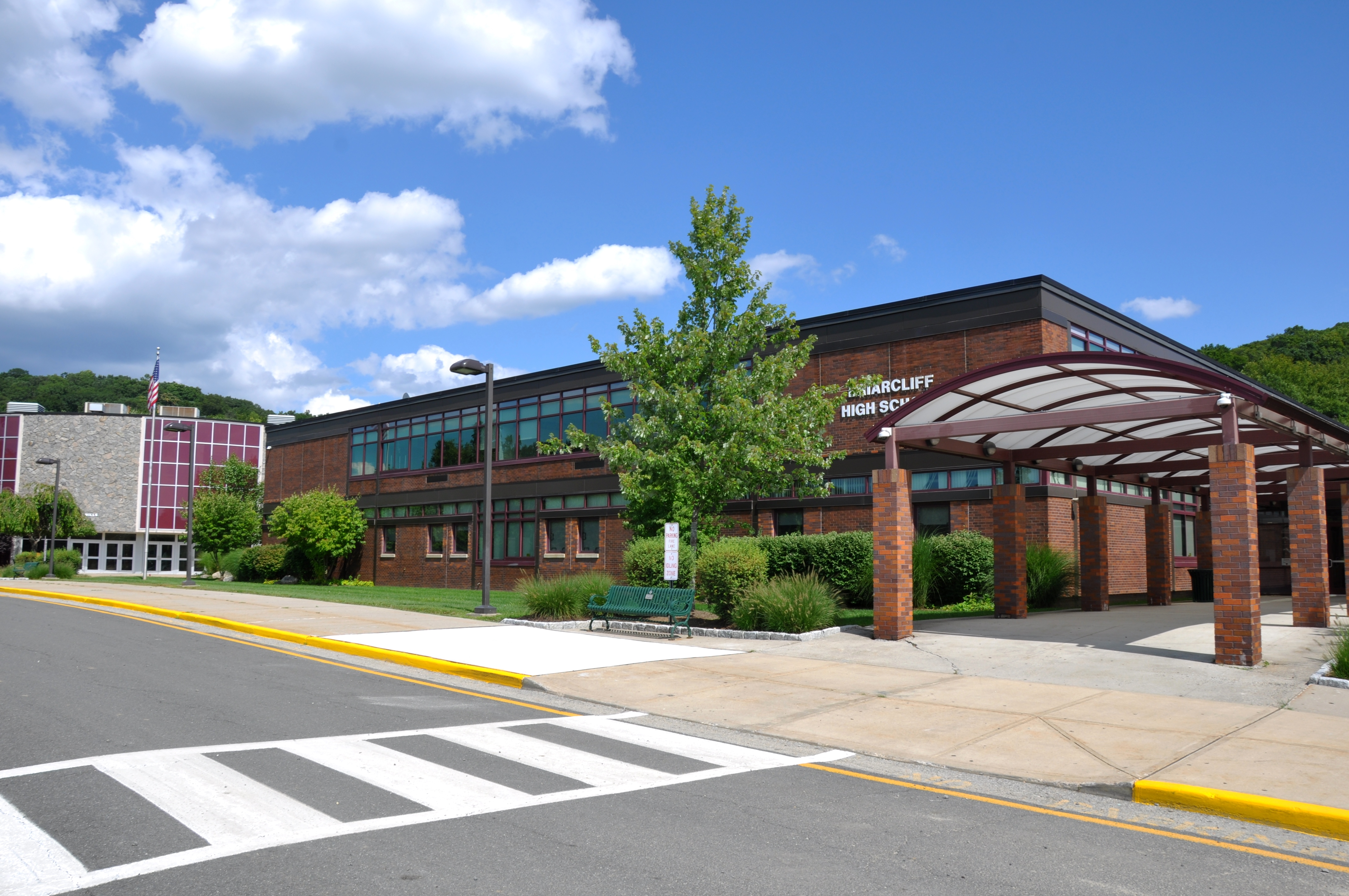
Briarcliff High School

Briarcliff High School (BHS) serves students in grades 9–12. The school is noted for student achievement, testing scores, its science research, world language, and performing arts programs, university in the High School and Advanced Placement courses, and graduation and college attendance rates. The school has a 10:1 student–teacher ratio, and 100 percent of students have proficiency in mathematics and English. In 2014, Newsweek ranked the high school 17th-best in the country.

The student body primarily consists of incoming graduates of Briarcliff Middle School. Additionally, students graduating from Pocantico Hills Central School have the option to attend high schools either at Briarcliff High School, Pleasantville High School, or Sleepy Hollow High School. The majority, 75 percent in 2016, attend Briarcliff High School. Through the district's affiliation with the Board of Cooperative Educational Services, students have the option for vocational education at the Tech Center at Yorktown, a program in Yorktown Heights.

The school was founded in 1928 at the Grade School building adjacent to Law Memorial Park. In 1971, the school moved to its current facility on the east border of the village.

== Transportation ==
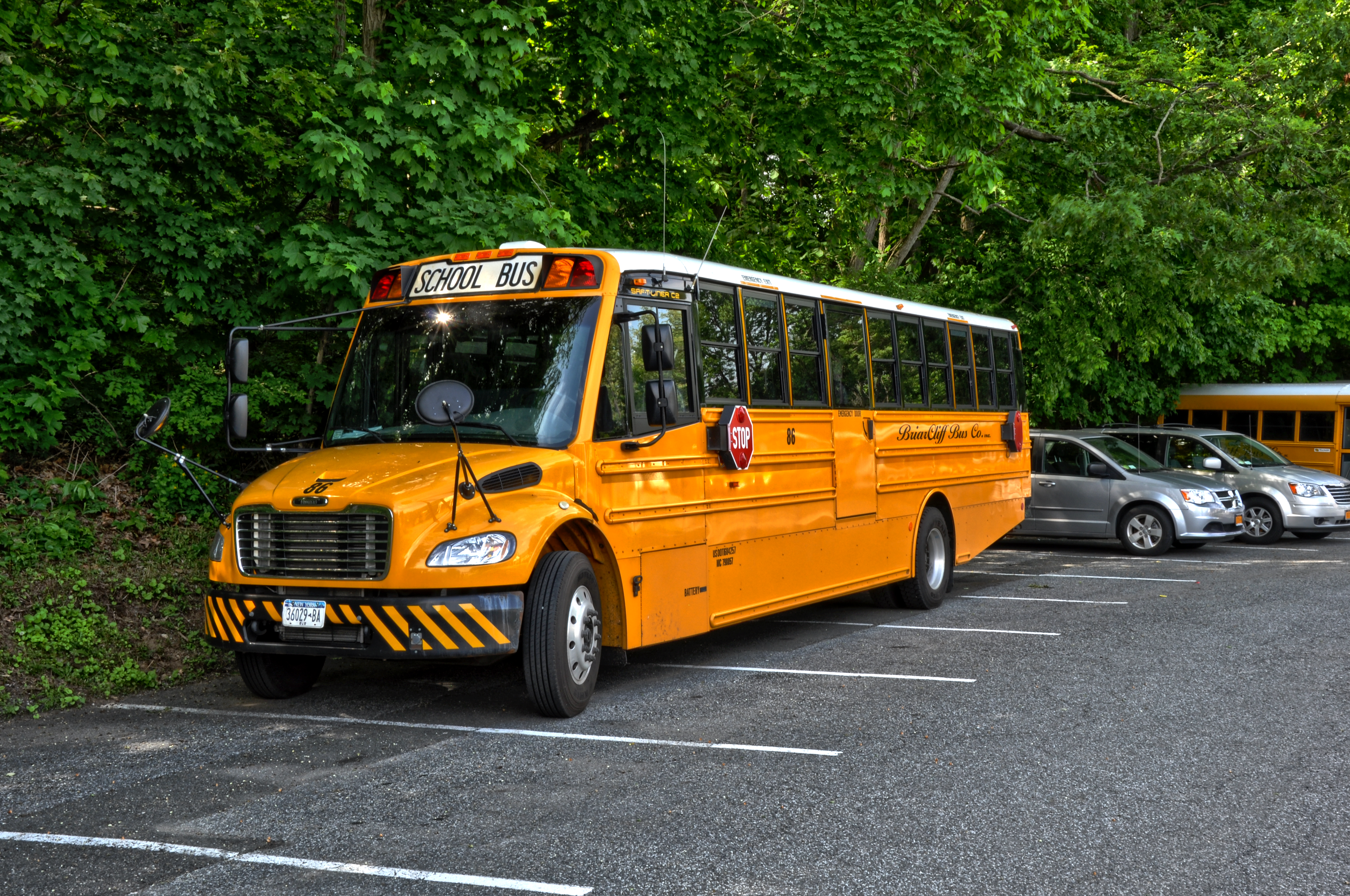
A Briarcliff Bus Co. Thomas Saf-T-Liner C2 school bus

The district offers transportation to students through Briarcliff Bus Company, which holds its vehicles at a private lot of the Scarborough train station. Transportation is available to students who live within 15 miles (24 km) from the school they attend; that students living on Ingham Road do not have school transportation to the nearby Todd Elementary School.

== See also ==
- Briarcliff High School
- List of school districts in New York
