= Pleasantville High School =

Pleasantville High School may refer to:

- Pleasantville Senior High School in Pleasantville, Iowa
- Pleasantville High School (New Jersey)
- Pleasantville High School (New York)
