= Briarcliff High School =

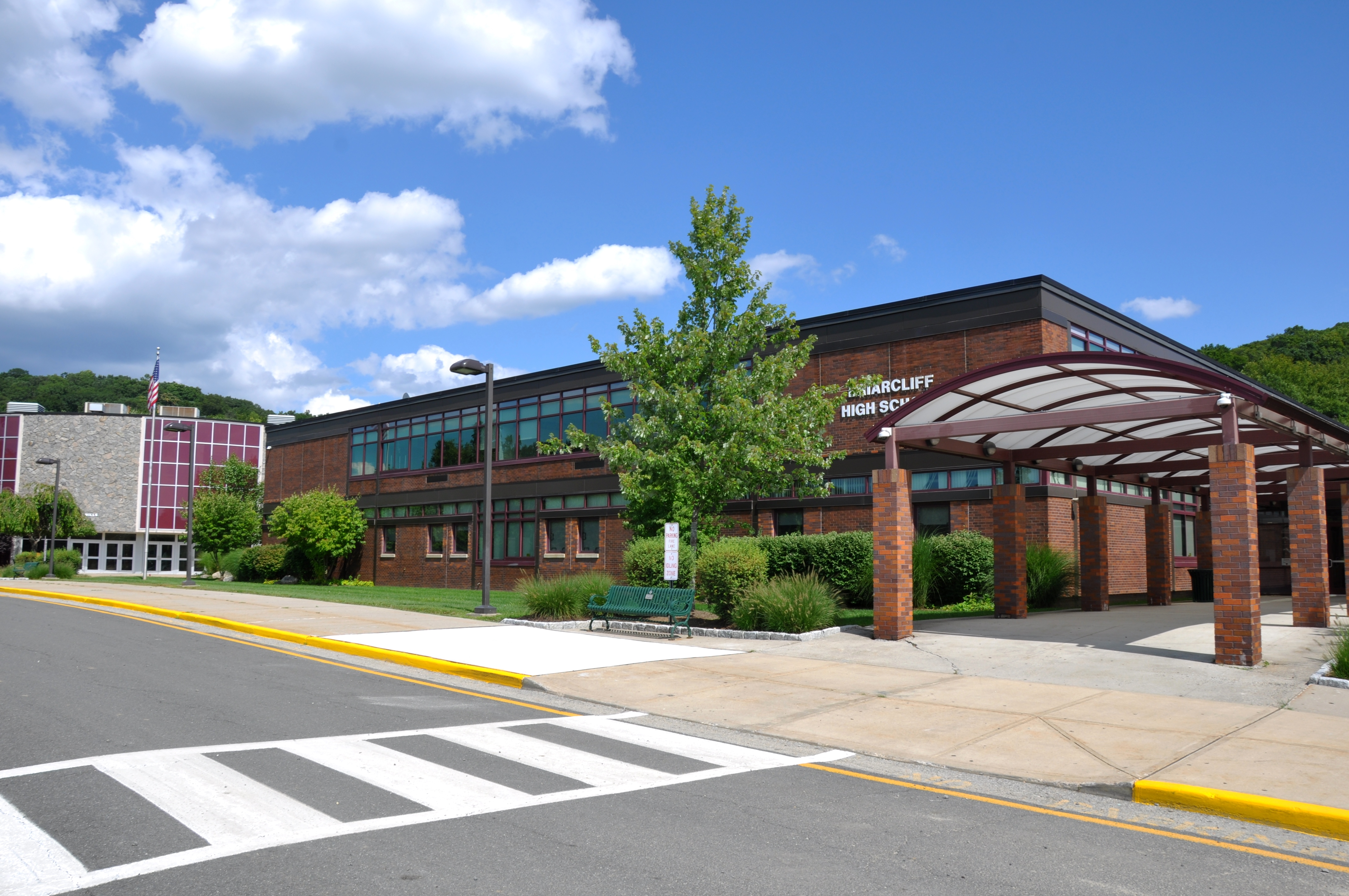
- High school façade, entranceway, and theater

Location
- 444 Pleasantville Road; Briarcliff Manor, New York 10510; United States

Information
- Type: Comprehensive public high school
- Motto: Community • Service • Excellence • Fulfillment
- Established: 1928
- School district: Briarcliff Manor Union Free School District
- CEEB code: 330505
- NCES School ID: 360534000268
- Principal: Diana Blank
- Faculty: 48.71 on FTE basis (as of 2017–2018)
- Grades: 9–12
- Gender: Coeducational
- Student to teacher ratio: 11:1
- Language: English
- Campus size: 43 acres (17 ha)
- Campus type: Suburban
- Colors: Blue and orange
- Athletics conference: Section 1 (NYSPHSAA)
- Mascot: Bear
- Team name: Briarcliff Bears
- Rival: Pleasantville High School
- Accreditations: New York State Board of Regents, Middle States Association of Colleges and Schools
- Newspaper: The Briarcliff Bulletin
- Yearbook: Bruin
- Tuition: $13,800 (Note: Tuition is only billed to students residing outside of the school district.)
- Communities served: Briarcliff Manor
- Website: www.briarcliffschools.org/our-schools/briarcliff-high-school

Briarcliff High School (BHS) is a public secondary school in Briarcliff Manor, New York, United States, that serves students in grades 9–12. It is the only high school in the Briarcliff Manor Union Free School District, sharing its campus with Briarcliff Middle School. As of 2021, the principal is Diana Blank, and the assistant principal is Daniel Goldberg.

Briarcliff is noted for outstanding student achievement, testing scores and accomplishments, including a highly regarded science research program, world language and performing arts programs, University in the High School and Advanced Placement courses, and graduation and college attendance rates. The school has an 11:1 student–teacher ratio, and nearly every student has at least grade-level proficiency in mathematics and English.

The student body primarily consists of graduates from Briarcliff Middle School. Additionally, students graduating from Pocantico Hills Central School have the option to attend high school either at Briarcliff High School, Pleasantville High School, or Sleepy Hollow High School. The majority—75 percent in 2013—attend Briarcliff High School. Students from Pocantico Hills and other districts pay tuition to attend. In 2015, Newsweek ranked the high school 31st-best in the country. The school was founded in 1928 at the grade school building adjacent to Law Memorial Park. In 1971, the school moved to its current facility on the east border of the village.

== History ==
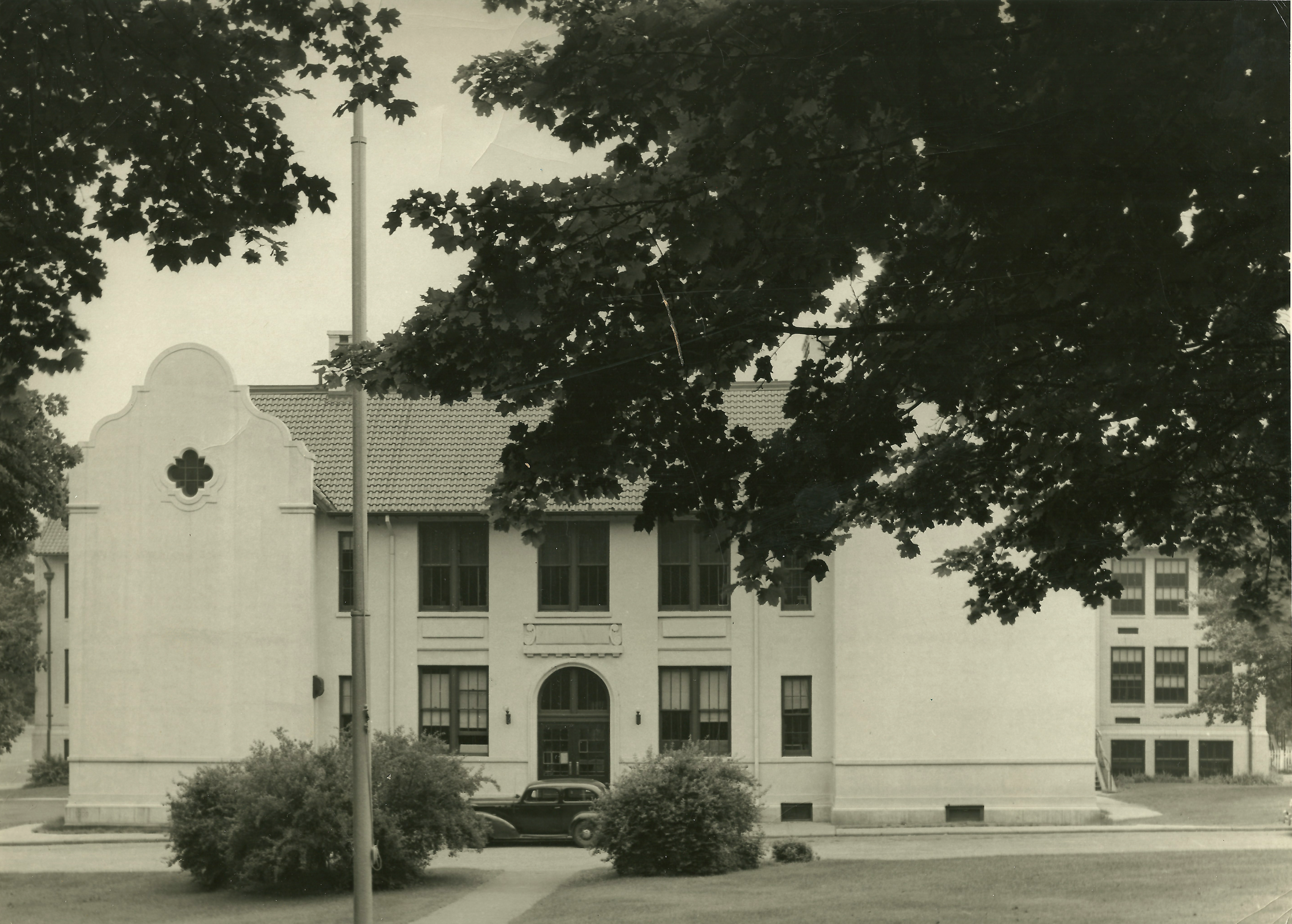
Briarcliff Grade School ca. 1930

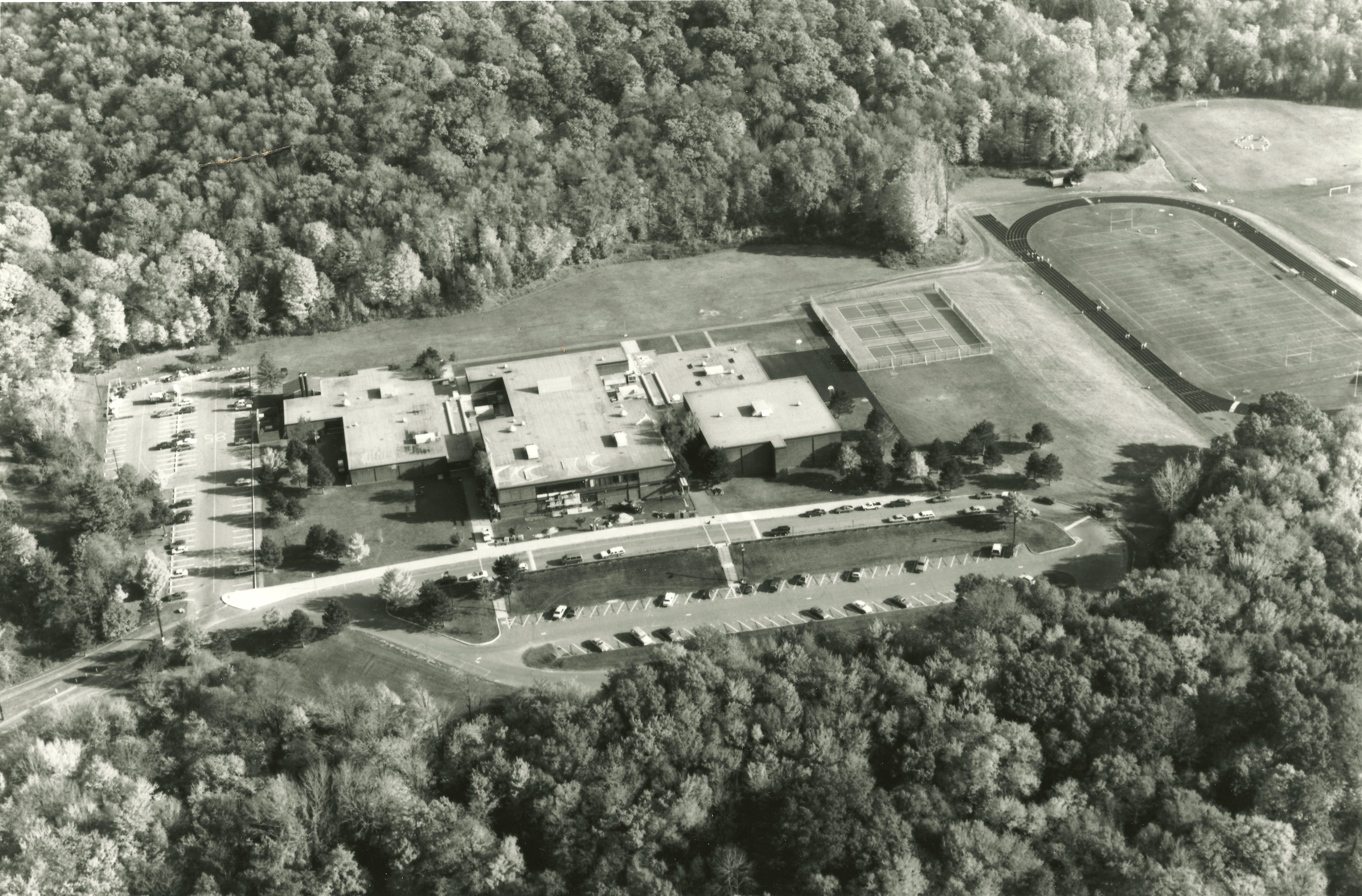
Aerial view of Briarcliff High School ca. 1980

From 1865 until 1918, Briarcliff Manor served students up to the ninth grade. Before 1918, Briarcliff students who wanted to proceed to high school would attend the nearby Ossining High School. After 1918, Briarcliff introduced an advanced curriculum for high school students. In 1923, four students were the first in a Briarcliff school to receive high school diplomas. In 1928, with the entrance of additional high school students, an extension was added to the Spanish Renaissance-style Grade School for use as Briarcliff High School. The building was located adjacent to the Walter W. Law Memorial Park. The enlarged school accepted students from Croton, Hawthorne, North White Plains, Valhalla, and as far as Granite Springs.

The high school newspaper, The Briarcliff Bulletin, was founded in 1948. As Briarcliff's student population expanded, the need for more school facilities became apparent. In 1950, students from kindergarten to fifth grade were moved to the new Todd Elementary School. In spite of the newly empty space in the Grade School building, the high school population's continued growth necessitated the construction of a new structure. Efforts were delayed until the 1960s, when the village government made plans to purchase 55 acres (22 ha) of the Choate estate. Pace University, however, purchased the entire estate, and it remains its Pleasantville campus. The Briarcliff Manor Board of Education took the matter to court and succeeded, and Pace sold 35 acres (14 ha) to the village, which bought eight additional acres.

The new site was completed in 1968, and the current high school building opened in 1971. In the 1980s, as school enrollment declined and costs increased, the grade school building was leased to Pace University and the remaining students in that building (grades six through eight) occupied a portion of the new high school building. In 1988, a plan for a larger village and school meeting and performance area was initiated. A new auditorium was completed in 1998. After a bond vote in 2001, the current Briarcliff Middle School was constructed in the early 2000s adjoining the high school.

In the summer and fall of 2011, several renovations took place, affecting primarily the high school. All front-facing windows of the high school were replaced with energy-efficient windows, and a permanent-storage building was constructed on the northeast side to store auditorium and maintenance supplies. In addition, many of the computers in the school were replaced with thin client computers. In 2013, the school's cardiovascular and weight lifting center was improved with more machines and equipment, increased space, new flat screen televisions, and other additions. In 2013 and 2014, the school's fields on the property were remediated due to the use of contaminated fill. The football field was completed with artificial turf, as well as the track and artificial turf baseball field; an artificial turf hockey field was to be completed by Labor Day. The lower soccer field will be reconstructed after the fall 2014 soccer season. Work on the softball field was finished in fall 2013. A security plan is to be submitted to the New York State Education Department; it includes plans to upgrade the main entrance doors and construct vestibules and greeter stations.

== Enrollment ==
As of 2014, the school had 587 students, including 81 from the Pocantico Hills Central School, comprising 13.8 percent of the student body. Students in the graduating class of 2013 had a 100 percent graduation rate and a 99 percent college placement rate. 99 percent of those students graduated with a Regents diploma, 50 percent with Advanced Designation with Honors, 21 percent with Advanced Designation, and 3 percent obtained Regents with Honors. 24 percent graduated with a standard Regents diploma and 1 percent with a local diploma.

Enrollment in Briarcliff High School since 1952
| Year | 1952–1953 | 2000–2001 | 2001–2002 | 2002–2003 | 2003–2004 | 2004–2005 | 2005–2006 | 2006–2007 | 2007–2008 | 2008–2009 | 2009–2010 | 2010–2011 | 2011–2012 | 2012–2013 | 2013–2014 |
|---|---|---|---|---|---|---|---|---|---|---|---|---|---|---|---|
| Enrollment | 224 | 448 | 489 | 534 | 560 | 601 | 679 | 657 | N/A | 654 | N/A | 591 | 606 | 552 | 587 |
1952–1953 • 2000 to 2006 • 2006–2007 • 2008–2009 • 2010 to 2014

== Theater and music ==
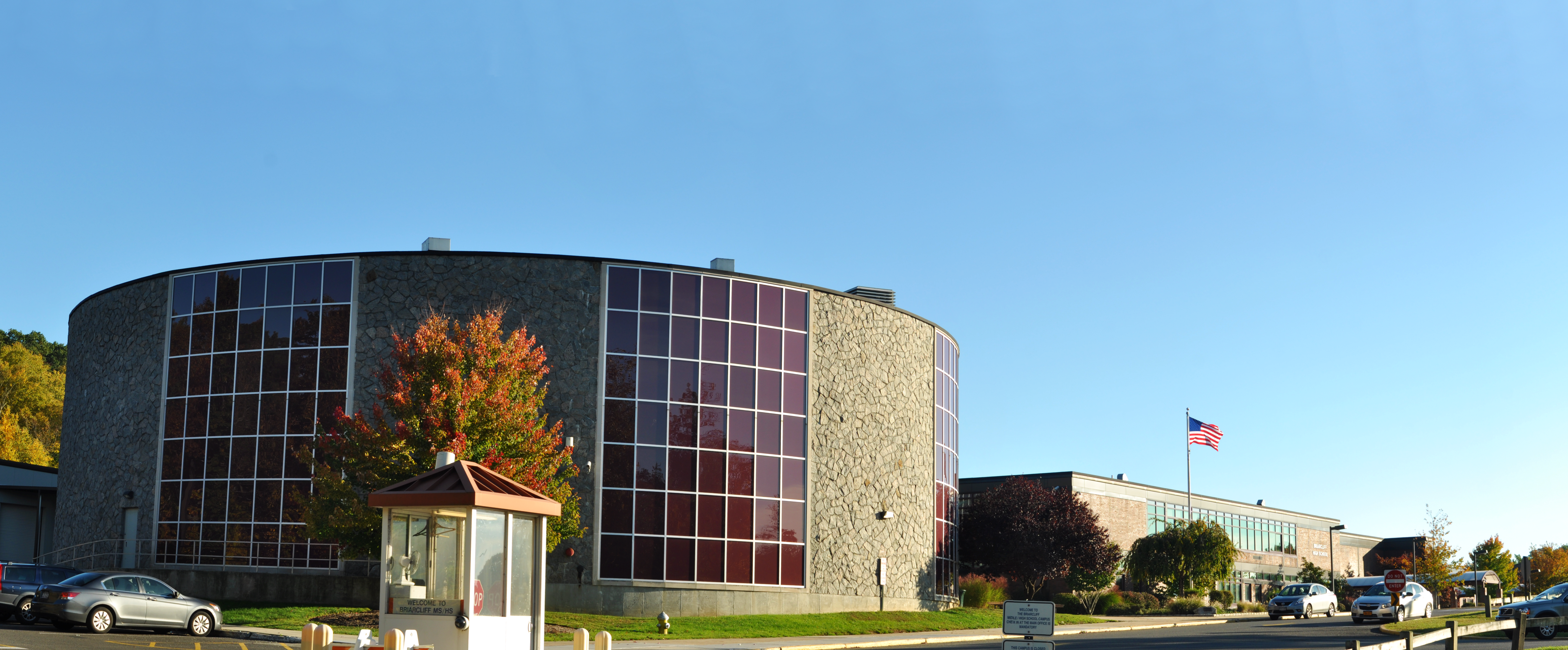
The Dr. Frances G. Wills Auditorium

Briarcliff High School hosts several theatrical and musical groups. School groups include the Fall Drama, the Spring Musical, Jazz Band, Pep Band, Camerata, Clifftones, Overtones, Chamber Orchestra, and Garage Orchestra. The high school prides itself on its arts curricula, and produces musicals and dramatic productions at the school auditorium, which was built in 1998 and seats 500. In 2010, it was renamed for former Superintendent Frances G. Wills. The auditorium has hosted other Briarcliff shows and events, including the Centennial Variety Show from April 26–27, 2002, arranged by the nine-member Briarcliff Manor Centennial Committee for the village's centennial celebration. The school was the first US high school to perform the British musical The Hired Man, from March 7–9, 2014.

The school is known for its annual musicals, which often sell out. The school also reaches out to professionals who volunteer their time; the assistant director at the Studio Theater (also the son of Frances G. Wills) ran a workshop on proper casting and auditions for the students and arranged for Children of Eden creator Stephen Schwartz to visit the school during its 2002 production of his musical.

Briarcliff is often recognized at the annual awards ceremony at the Helen Hayes Youth Theatre in Nyack, ceremonies which are held in early June with awards in numerous categories, modeled after the Tony Award. Their 2002 performance of Children of Eden earned ten nominations and three awards, for overall production, actor in a lead role, and director. The school spent $23,000 on the production to pay for royalties, stipends for teachers acting as choreographers, musical directors and rehearsal accompanists, and for external workers to help students improve the production's lighting, sets and sound. For their 2003 production of Footloose, the school's musical director Kathleen Donovan-Warren rented multicolored stage lighting and hired an electric guitarist as one of three professional musicians who played along with the student orchestra. There was a tradition in the musicals for the superintendent to have a cameo in the show, up until around 1999.

== Sports ==
Athletic Teams at Briarcliff High SchoolV = Varsity, VB = Varsity B, JV = Junior VarsityF = Freshmen, Mod = Modified
| Sport | Level | Season | Gender |
|---|---|---|---|
| Baseball | V, JV, F, Mod | Spring | Boys |
| Basketball | V, JV, F, Mod | Winter | Boys, Girls |
| Bowling | V | Winter | Boys, Girls |
| Cheerleading | V | Fall, Winter | Girls |
| Cross country running | V, JV, Mod | Fall | Boys, Girls |
| Field Hockey | V, JV, Mod | Fall | Co-ed |
| Football | V, F, Mod | Fall | Boys |
| Golf | V, JV | Spring | Co-ed |
| Ice hockey | V | Winter | Co-ed |
| Lacrosse | V, JV, Mod | Spring | Boys, Girls |
| Soccer | V, JV, Mod | Fall | Boys, Girls |
| Softball | V, JV, Mod | Spring | Girls |
| Swimming/Diving | V | Fall, Winter | Boys, Girls |
| Tennis | V, JV | Spring, Fall | Boys, Girls |
| Track and field | V, JV, Mod | Winter, Spring | Co-ed |
| Volleyball | V, JV, Mod | Fall | Girls |

Besides intramural sports, Briarcliff High School has junior varsity and varsity teams in sixteen sports, playing under the name Briarcliff Bears. The baseball team won the state championship in 1998, and the section 1 championship each year from 2001 to 2003, led by flamethrower Bob Blevins. In 2010 they made it back to the section finals, led by seniors James Lombardi and Danny Collins. This sparked two state final runs in 2011 and 2012, led by slugger John Fussell. Boys' basketball was a Class B powerhouse from 2006 to 2008, winning the section championship in 2006–07 over Woodlands. In 2007–08, they were heavy favorites but lost in the section finals to North Salem. They reclaimed the Class B crown in 2016, defeating Putnam Valley.

In 2010 the girls' soccer team became nationally ranked by ESPN as a top-50 national team.

As of recently, the girls' varsity soccer team has won the title of class B section 1 champions, as the boys had made it as the finalists. As of 2023, the girls' JV soccer team had been undefeated.

== Academics ==
Along with classrooms, a writing lab, and a library, the school has an open room called the Maresca, where students study surrounded by teachers' offices. The school offers courses in five languages: Spanish, Latin, French, conversational Italian, and Mandarin Chinese. Through the district's affiliation with the Board of Cooperative Educational Services, students have the option for vocational education at the Tech Center at Yorktown, a program in Yorktown Heights. Briarcliff High School's electives include:

| English | Languages | Mathematics | Science | Social Studies | Performing arts | Visual arts | Technology |
|---|---|---|---|---|---|---|---|
| Drama; TV Production; Creative Writing; Public Speaking; Short Fiction | Conversational Italian I and II; Mandarin Chinese; Spanish; French; Latin | Statistics; Computer Applications; Business and Finance; Finite Mathematics; Calculus | Marine Biology; Forensics; Environmental Science; Topics in Chemistry | Law in America; Psychology; Sociology; Global Interaction | Band; Choral Music; Orchestra; Dance; Music Theory | Photo I, II, and III; Digital Photography; Ceramics; Sculpture | Introduction to Java I and II; Principles of Engineering |

== School ranking ==
Briarcliff High School is 31st out of 1,259 schools in the 2015 U.S. News & World Report rankings for New York, and 212th out of about 21,000 schools nationally. In the 2014 U.S. News & World Report, the school was 31st out of about 1,100 schools in the rankings for New York, and 156th out of about 19,400 schools nationally. In the 2013 report, the school was 31st out of about 1,100 schools in New York, and 170th out of about 21,000 schools nationally. Newsweek ranked the school 31st nationally in 2015, 17th nationally in 2014, 106th nationally, 20th in New York, and 28th in New England in 2013, 96th nationally and 17th in New York in 2005, and in 2000 Newsweek ranked the school 42nd-best in the country.

Briarcliff's school district, the Briarcliff Manor Union Free School District, is rated as the fifth-wealthiest school district in the United States and the third-wealthiest in New York. Briarcliff High School students greatly exceed averages on New York State Assessment tests, with almost 100 percent of Briarcliff students having recorded passing grades.

== Notable alumni ==
Notable alumni of Briarcliff High School include:

- Michael Azerrad, author
- Clifford Carter, musician
- John Hersey, Pulitzer Prize-winning writer and journalist who grew up in Briarcliff and attended the public schools
- Brice Marden (class of 1965), minimalist painter who grew up in the village
- Tom Ortenberg, CEO of Open Road Films and former president of Lionsgate Films
- Jen Sincero (class of 1983), New York Times bestselling author
- Ali Vitali, journalist and author
- Bobby Blevins (class of 2003), minor league baseball player who grew up in the village
- Susan Bassett (class of 1975) was a competitive swimmer in high school and a swim coach and Assistant Director of Athletics at Union College, where her teams won three New York State Championships. After 1995, she served as a Director of Athletics for Hobart and William Smith Colleges; Carnegie Mellon University; and her alma mater, Ithaca College.

== See also ==
- Education in New York
