= Bobby Blevins =

American baseball player (born 1985)

Long Island Ducks – No. 18
- Coach / Pitcher
- Born: January 16, 1985 (age 41); Briarcliff Manor, New York, U.S.
- Batted: Right Threw: Right

CPBL debut
- March 27, 2015, for the Chinatrust Brothers

Last CPBL appearance
- May 12, 2015, for the Chinatrust Brothers

CPBL statistics
- Win–loss record: 4–4
- Earned run average: 6.47
- Strikeouts: 23
- Stats at Baseball Reference

Teams
- Chinatrust Brothers (2015)

Robert W. Blevins Jr. (born January 16, 1985) is an American former professional baseball pitcher. He currently serves as the pitching coach for the Long Island Ducks of the Atlantic League of Professional Baseball. He played in the Chinese Professional Baseball League (CPBL) for the Chinatrust Brothers. He grew up in Briarcliff Manor, New York and attended Briarcliff High School there and Le Moyne College in Syracuse, New York.

== Playing career ==
Blevins attended Briarcliff High School, where he played for the Bears and was a successful pitcher there. Blevins graduated from the high school in 2003, and then attended Le Moyne College; there he played in NCAA's Division I for four years.

=== Los Angeles Dodgers ===
Blevins was drafted by the Los Angeles Dodgers in the 13th round, with the 416th overall selection, of the 2007 Major League Baseball draft. He then made his professional debut late in the year with the rookie–level Ogden Raptors, posting a 3.49 ERA in 12 games. Blevins spent the 2008 and 2009 seasons with the Single–A Great Lakes Loons. He posted a 2.96 ERA with 5 saves in 2008, and an 11–10 record and 4.16 ERA in 2009.

Blevins split the 2010 season between the High–A Inland Empire 66ers, Double–A Chattanooga Lookouts, and Triple–A Albuquerque Isotopes. In 33 contests between the three affiliates, he logged a 4–10 record and 5.62 ERA with 59 strikeouts across 105 2/3 innings pitched. Blevins was released by the Dodgers organization on March 25, 2011.

=== Rockland Boulders ===
Blevins signed with the Rockland Boulders of the Can-Am League for the 2011 season. In 19 starts, he recorded a 6–8 record and 3.98 ERA with 82 strikeouts across 131 innings.

In 2012, Blevins pitched in 21 games (starting 20) and recorded an 8–9 record and 3.65 ERA with 86 strikeouts.

=== Long Island Ducks ===
On August 28, 2012, Blevins was traded to the Long Island Ducks of the Atlantic League of Professional Baseball. He made 6 appearances (4 starts) for the club, pitching to a 2.42 ERA with 16 strikeouts in 26 innings.

=== Rockland Boulders (second stint) ===
Blevins re–signed with the Rockland Boulders in 2013, and was named the team's Opening Day pitcher. In 20 starts for the team, he worked to a 9–10 record and 4.24 ERA with 82 strikeouts.

=== Long Island Ducks (second stint) ===
Blevins re–joined the Long Island Ducks for the team's playoff run in September 2013, making two starts and logging a 1–1 record and 4.85 ERA with 10 strikeouts. Following the season, he agreed to pitch for Fortitudo Baseball Bologna in the 2013 Asia Series.

In 2014, Blevins started 27 games for the Ducks, registering a 9–5 record and 2.95 ERA with 119 strikeouts across 189 1/3 innings of work.

=== Chinatrust Brothers ===
On March 6, 2015, Blevins signed with the Chinatrust Brothers of the Chinese Professional Baseball League, and made his CPBL debut on March 27. In 9 starts, Blevins pitched to a 4–4 record and 6.47 ERA with 23 strikeouts in 55 2/3 innings.

=== Long Island Ducks (third stint) ===
In mid–June 2015, Blevins once more re–signed with the Long Island Ducks. In 15 contests (14 starts), he posted a 4–4 record and 3.83 ERA with 67 strikeouts across 89 1/3 innings.

On May 11, 2016, Blevins signed with the Acereros de Monclova of the Mexican League. However, he did not make an appearance for the team before being released on May 18, and returned to the Ducks. Blevins saw a dip in his starts in 2016, as he struggled to a 2–12 record and 5.51 ERA across 23 appearances (22 starts).

=== Sugar Land Skeeters ===
On April 6, 2017, Blevins signed with the Sugar Land Skeeters of the Atlantic League of Professional Baseball. In 27 appearances for the team, Blevins registered a 7–7 record and 4.85 ERA with 95 strikeouts across 133 2/3 innings of work.

=== Somerset Patriots ===
On July 24, 2018, Blevins signed with the Somerset Patriots of the Atlantic League of Professional Baseball. He made only one appearance for the Patriots, tossing six scoreless innings with two strikeouts against the Southern Maryland Blue Crabs.

=== Québec Capitales ===
On August 25, 2018, Blevins was traded to the Québec Capitales of the Can-Am League. He made three appearances (one start) for Québec, recording a 3.27 ERA with 9 strikeouts across 11 innings pitched.

=== Somerset Patriots (second stint) ===
On September 23, 2018, Blevins was traded back to the Somerset Patriots to start the team's final game after Vince Molesky was sidelined due to injury.

Blevins made two starts for Somerset in 2019, logging an 0–2 record and 5.54 ERA with 6 strikeouts across 13 innings pitched.

== Coaching career ==
On January 16, 2024, Blevins was announced as the pitching coach for the Long Island Ducks of the Atlantic League of Professional Baseball.
