= Christian Petroni =

American chef and restaurateur

- Born: Bronx, New York City, New York, U.S.
- Culinary career
- Previous restaurants: * Barcelona, Greenwich, CT, * Fortina, various locations
- Television shows: * Chopped (May 4, 2010), * Food Network Star, * Master Chef (TV Australia Series), * Top Chef Australia, * Guy's Grocery Games (2019–2021), * Tournament of Champions (2020–2023)

Cristiano Petroni is an American celebrity chef and restaurateur. While he appeared on Chopped Season 4, Episode 5 (Mussels Mastery and Cotton Candy Can-Do) in 2010, emerging as the winner, he came to prominence in 2018 as the joint winner of the fourteenth season of the Food Network television series Food Network Star (along with Jess Tom).

In 2020, 2021, 2022 and 2023, he has participated in the culinary competition reality television series Guy Fieri's Tournament of Champions (Food Network), seasons 1-4.
