= Jason Smith (chef) =

American chef (born 1977)

- Born: December 1977 (age 48); Grayson, Kentucky, United States

Jason Smith is an American home baker who came to prominence as the winner of the thirteenth season of the Food Network television series Food Network Star. He had previously won the third season of Holiday Baking Championship. Smith most recently served as a judge on the Food Network series Best Baker in America. He was a guest judge on the fourth season of the Christmas Cookie Challenge, appearing in episode 4. Jason Smith served as judge along with Shinmin Li during the first season of the Food Network series Holiday Wars. In 2024, he competed on the Amazon Freevee series The GOAT, where he finished in third place.
