= Best Baker in America =

- Genre: Food reality television
- Presented by: Adam Rapoport (Season 1); Scott Conant (Seasons 2-3); Carla Hall (Season 4)
- Judges: Jason Smith; Marcela Valladolid (Seasons 1-3); Gesine Prado; (Season 4)
- Country of origin: United States
- Original language: English
- No. of seasons: 4
- No. of episodes: 26

Production
- Producer: Triage Entertainment
- Running time: 41:00

Original release
- Network: Food Network
- Release: September 27, 2017 – June 7, 2021

Best Baker in America is an American cooking reality competition television series that airs on Food Network.

The first season of the series officially premiered on September 27, 2017; and it was presented by Bon Appétit magazine editor Adam Rapoport, who also served as a judge alongside Food Network chefs Jason Smith and Marcela Valladolid. The second season of the series premiered on May 7, 2018; with Rapoport having been replaced as host by chef Scott Conant, along with a rotating lineup of special guest chefs who would serve as the third judge. The third season premiered on May 13, 2019. Season 4 premiered on May 3, 2021.

== Season 1 ==
There are 8 professional and home bakers competing in a 6-episode baking tournament. One person is eliminated every week until the final episode where the final three compete for the grand prize of $25,000.

Contestants

1st - Dwayne Ingraham, Executive Pastry Chef from Oxford, MS

2nd/3rd - Andy Chlebana, Pastry Instructor from Plainfield, IL

2nd/3rd - Thiago Silva, Executive Pastry Chef from Boston, MA

4th - Adalberto Diaz Labrada, Pastry Chef and Instructor from Salt Lake City, UT

5th - Cheryl Storms, Bakery Owner from San Diego, CA

6th - Brittani Brooker, Executive Pastry Chef from Charlotte, NC

7th - Susana Mijares, Bakery Owner from San Antonio, TX

8th - Margarita Kallas-Lee, Pastry Chef from Los Angeles, CA

=== Episodes ===
Ep. #	Title	Original Air Date
1	"Cake"	September 27, 2017
	Skills Challenge: The bakers must create flawless mini upside-down cakes. Winner: Dwayne Ingraham Master Challenge: The bakers are tasked with making a double barrel or three-tiered wedding cake for 50 people using lemon as the featured flavor. Winner: Cheryl Storms Eliminated: Margarita Kallas-Lee	
2	"Meringue"	October 4, 2017
	Skills Challenge: The bakers are charged with making two different flavors of macarons. Winner: Adalberto Diaz Labrada Master Challenge: The bakers must make their own highly-creative take on the dessert classic, baked Alaska, using torched meringue, cake and ice cream, with strawberry as the featured flavor. Winner: Dwayne Ingraham Eliminated: Susana Mijares	
3	"Pastry"	October 11, 2017
	Skills Challenge: The bakers must make perfect mini fruit tarts using pate sucree or sweet pastry. Winner: Cheryl Storms Master Challenge: The bakers are given their hardest task yet: their original version of a St Honore Cake, which must contain elements of puff pastry, pate au choux, and creme chiboust, as well as feature the required flavor of coffee. Winner: Thiago Silva Eliminated: Brittani Brooker	
4	"Cafe Classics"	October 18, 2017
	Skills Challenge: The bakers tackle the deceptively simple creme brulee. Winner: Dwayne Ingraham Master Challenge: The bakers are tasked with baking up their take on the complex and beautiful opera cake, a six-layer masterpiece said to evoke the tiers of the Paris Opera House, which must feature the flavor of hazelnut. Winner: Andy Chlebana Eliminated: Cheryl Storms	
5	"Modern Classics"	October 25, 2017
	Skills Challenge: The bakers make mini mirror glaze cakes—perfectly mirrored on the outside with layered mousse on the inside. Winner: Dwayne Ingraham Master Challenge: The bakers must bake, plate and present a two-course dessert tasting menu feature chilies and fennel. Winner: Thiago Silva Eliminated: Adalberto Diaz Labrada	
6	"Chocolate"	November 1, 2017
	Skills Challenge: The final three bakers must make a perfect version of the ever-temperamental chocolate souffle. Winner: Andy Chlebana Master Challenge: The bakers must create the ultimate chocolate cake—a truly spectacular, elaborately decorated cake, using some type of liquor as the required featured flavor. Winner of $25,000: Dwayne Ingraham Eliminated: Andy Chlebana and Thiago Silva	

=== Elimination Table ===
Place	Contestant	Episode					
Place	Contestant	1	2	3	4	5	6
1	Dwayne	IN‡	WIN	IN	LOW‡	LOW‡	WINNER
2	Andy	IN	IN	IN	WIN	LOW	RUNNER-UP‡
2	Thiago	IN	LOW	WIN	HIGH	WIN	RUNNER-UP
4	Adalberto	IN	IN‡	HIGH	IN	ELIM	
5	Cheryl	WIN	HIGH	LOW‡	ELIM		
6	Brittani	HIGH	IN	ELIM			
7	Susana	LOW	ELIM				
8	Margarita	ELIM					

(WINNER) This baker won the competition.
(RUNNER-UP) This baker was a finalist.
(ELIM) This baker was eliminated.
(IN) This baker never had the best dish or the worst.
(HIGH) This baker had one of the best dishes.
(WIN) This baker had the best dish.
‡ This baker had the best dish in the skills challenge.
(LOW) This baker was last to be called safe.

== Season 2 ==
There are 9 contestants competing in a 7-episode baking tournament. One person is eliminated every week until the final episode where the final three compete for the grand prize of $25,000.

=== Contestants ===
1st - Adam Young, Bakery Owner and Head Pastry Chef from Mystic, CT

2nd/3rd - Jean-Francois Suteau, Executive Pastry Chef from White Sulphur Springs, WV

2nd/3rd - Lasheeda Perry, Executive Pastry Chef from Atlanta, GA

4th - Max Santiago, Executive Pastry Chef from Miami, FL

5th - Becca Craig, Executive Cake Chef from Philadelphia, PA

6th - Leigh Omilinsky, Pastry Chef from Chicago, IL

7th - Jeremy Fogg, Pastry Chef from New Orleans, LA

8th - Kym DeLost, Pastry Chef from Chicago, IL

9th - Frania Mendivil, Executive Pastry Chef from Los Angeles, CA

=== Episodes ===
Ep. #	Title	Original Air Date
1	"Cake, Glorious Cake"	May 7, 2018
	Skills Challenge: The bakers are tasked with baking perfect Petit Fours. Winner: Adam Young Master Challenge: The bakers must create a mind-bending cake for 50 people using vanilla as the featured flavor. Winner: Max Santiago Eliminated: Frania Mendivil	
2	"Wedding Spectacular"	May 14, 2018
	Skills Challenge: The bakers are charged with making perfect wedding-themed mini mousse cakes. Winner: Max Santiago Master Challenge: The bakers must create a croquembouche-inspired wedding tower that includes two types of pastry and uses champagne as the featured flavor. Winner: Jean-Francois Suteau Eliminated: Kym DeLost	
3	"Summer Desserts"	May 21, 2018
	Skills Challenge: The bakers must make a perfect strawberry shortcake. Winner: Lasheeda Perry Master Challenge: The bakers must create a "fire and ice" dessert that features one frozen element, one bruleed element and has mint as the featured flavor. Winner: Adam Young Eliminated: Jeremy Fogg	
4	"East Coast Classics"	May 28, 2018
	Skills Challenge: The bakers must create flawless mini Boston cream pies. Winner: Adam Young Master Challenge: The bakers are tasked to bake their version of the "ultimate" New York cheesecake with apple as the featured flavor. Winner: Becca Craig Eliminated: Leigh Omilinsky	
5	"Magnificent Meringue"	June 4, 2018
	Skills Challenge: The bakers must make mini meringue pies. Winner: Adam Young Master Challenge: The bakers are challenged to feature raspberry flavor in a classical French layered meringue cake called a marjolaine. Winner: Lasheeda Perry Eliminated: Becca Craig	
6	"Old-School Classics"	June 11, 2018
	Skills Challenge: The bakers must make historic Mont Blanc cakes, which are tarts topped with a tower of chestnut paste. Winner: Jean-Francois Suteau Master Challenge: The bakers have to make a striking cake called a Charlotte Royale—also known as "brain cake"—with peanut butter as the featured flavor. Winner: Jean-Francois Suteau Eliminated: Max Santiago	
7	"Chocolate Crescendo"	June 18, 2018
	Skills Challenge: The bakers must create a perfect version of the glazed Austrian chocolate cake called sachertorte. Winner: Adam Young Master Challenge: The bakers must create the ultimate chocolate cake for 100 people that features caramel flavor and elaborate chocolate decorations, three types of chocolate and three flavors of chocolate bonbons. Winner of $25,000: Adam Young Eliminated: Jean-Francois Suteau and Lasheeda Perry	

=== Elimination Table ===
Place	Contestant	Episode						
Place	Contestant	1	2	3	4	5	6	7
1	Adam	IN‡	IN	WIN	LOW‡	HIGH‡	IN	WINNER‡
2	Jean-Francois	IN	WIN	IN	IN	LOW	WIN‡	RUNNER-UP
2	Lasheeda	LOW	LOW	IN‡	HIGH	WIN	LOW	RUNNER-UP
4	Max	WIN	IN‡	IN	IN	LOW	ELIM	
5	Becca	HIGH	IN	HIGH	WIN	ELIM		
6	Leigh	IN	HIGH	LOW	ELIM			
7	Jeremy	IN	IN	ELIM				
8	Kym	IN	ELIM					
9	Frania	ELIM						

(WINNER) This baker won the competition.
(RUNNER-UP) This baker was a finalist.
(ELIM) This baker was eliminated.
(IN) This baker never had the best dish or the worst.
(HIGH) This baker had one of the best dishes.
(WIN) This baker had the best dish.
‡ This baker had the best dish in the skills challenge.
(LOW) This baker was last to be called safe.

== Season 3 ==
There are 9 contestants competing in a 7-episode baking tournament. One person is eliminated every week until the final episode where the final three compete for the grand prize of $25,000.

=== Contestants ===
1st - Eric Keppler, Executive Pastry Chef from East Palo Alto, CA

2nd/3rd - Jeffrey De Leon, Pastry Chef Consultant from White Los Angeles, CA

2nd/3rd - Joshua Livsey, Executive Pastry Chef from Boston, MA

4th - Marian Mulero, Pastry Chef from Miami, FL

5th - Julie Franceschini, Executive Pastry Chef from West Palm Beach, FL

6th - Michael Russ II, Executive Pastry Chef from Oakland, CA

7th - Edet Okon, Freelance Cake Artist and Owner from Houston, TX

8th - Yolanda Diaz, Executive Pastry Chef from Austin, TX

9th - Casey Renee, Pastry Chef from Pittsburgh, PA

=== Episodes ===
Ep. #	Title	Original Air Date
1	"Royal Cakes"	May 13, 2019
	Skills Challenge: The bakers are challenged to create perfect mini princess cakes. Winner: Julie Franceschini Master Challenge: The bakers have to create spectacular royal baby celebration cakes for 100 people using elderflower and lemon as the featured flavors. Winner: Michael Russ II Eliminated: Casey Renee	
2	"Surprise Desserts"	May 20, 2019
	Skills Challenge: The bakers are tasked with showing their mastery of molten lava cakes. Winner: Joshua Livsey Master Challenge: The bakers must create smashable desserts using meringue, sugar or chocolate and coconut as the featured flavor. Winner: Eric Keppler Eliminated: Yolanda Diaz	
3	"Summer Vacation Desserts"	May 27, 2019
	Skills Challenge: The bakers make perfect floating island desserts. Winner: Jeffrey De Leon Master Challenge: The bakers create a flaming bombe Alaska with mango as the featured flavor. Winner: Joshua Livsey Eliminated: Edet Okon	
4	"Classic French Pastries Reinvented"	June 3, 2019
	Skills Challenge: The bakers are challenged to recreate a beloved French classic, the éclair. Winner: Joshua Livsey Master Challenge: The bakers have to reimagine a classic French entremet cake using almond as the featured flavor. Winner: Joshua Livsey Eliminated: Michael Russ II	
5	"Themed Desserts: Toy Story 4"	June 10, 2019
	Skills Challenge: The bakers make Toy Story-themed mini desserts perfect for a movie premiere party. Winner: Eric Keppler Master Challenge: The bakers are challenged to choose a character from Disney Pixar's Toy Story 4 to replicate in cake and they have to include a flavor that speaks to the spirit of their character. Winner: Jeffrey De Leon Eliminated: Julie Franceschini	
6	"Tiny and Tall Desserts"	June 17, 2019
	Skills Challenge: The bakers are challenged to make miniature versions of two pastry classics. Winner: Jeffrey De Leon Master Challenge: The bakers create a tall dessert of their choosing with at least 12 solid layers and sesame as the featured flavor. Winner: Joshua Livsey Eliminated: Marian Mulero	
7	"All-American Birthday Bash: Chocolate-Flavored"	June 24, 2019
	Skills Challenge: The bakers create grown-up versions of a brownie sundae. Winner: Jeffrey De Leon Master Challenge: The bakers make a Happy Birthday USA chocolate fireworks cake to celebrate July 4! The elaborately decorated cake for 100 people must feature fireworks-themed chocolate and sugar decorations, three types of chocolate and two types of macarons with salty snacks as the featured ingredient. Winner of $25,000: Eric Keppler Eliminated: Joshua Livsey and Jeffrey De Leon	

=== Elimination Table ===
Place	Contestant	Episode						
Place	Contestant	1	2	3	4	5	6	7
1	Eric	IN	WIN	IN	HIGH	IN‡	LOW	WINNER
2	Jeffrey	LOW	IN	HIGH‡	IN	WIN	LOW‡	RUNNER-UP‡
2	Joshua	HIGH	IN‡	WIN	WIN‡	IN	WIN	RUNNER-UP
4	Marian	IN	IN	IN	LOW	LOW	ELIM	
5	Julie	IN‡	IN	IN	IN	ELIM		
6	Michael	WIN	HIGH	LOW	ELIM			
7	Edet	IN	LOW	ELIM				
8	Yolanda	IN	ELIM					
9	Casey	ELIM						

(WINNER) This baker won the competition.
(RUNNER-UP) This baker was a finalist.
(ELIM) This baker was eliminated.
(IN) This baker never had the best dish or the worst.
(HIGH) This baker had one of the best dishes.
(WIN) This baker had the best dish.
‡ This baker had the best dish in the skills challenge.
(LOW) This baker was last to be called safe.

== Season 4 ==
=== Contestants ===
- 1st-Jackie Joseph, Baker from Louisville, Kentucky
- 2/3rd- Caitlyn Cox, Executive Baker from the Nashville, Tennessee
- 2/3rd- Katrina Tayo, Executive Pastry Chef from Las Vegas, Nevada
- 4th- Michele Pompei, Executive Pastry Chef from Walla Walla, Washington
- 5th- Clarice Lam, Bakery Owner from Brooklyn, New York
- 6th- Aaron Manuyag, Executive Pastry Chef from Tucson, Arizona
- 7th- Caryn Martinez, Executive Pastry Chef from Columbus, Ohio
- 8th- Yassmeen Haskins Jackson, Owns Cocoa & Nuts Pastries in Baltimore, Maryland
- 9th- Felicia Mayden, Pastry Chef at Ace Hotel in Chicago, Illinois
- 10th- Miranda Prince, Executive Pastry Chef from Las Vegas, Nevada

=== Elimination Table ===
Place	Contestant	Episode								
Place	Contestant	1	2	3	4	5	6	7	8	
1	Jackie	IN	HIGH	IN	WIN	WIN	LOW	IN	IN	WINNER
2/3	Katrina	IN	IN	LOW	IN	LOW	WIN	WIN	IN	Runner-up
2/3	Caitlyn	WIN	LOW	IN	LOW	LOW	WIN	LOW	IN	Runner-up
4	Michele	IN	WIN	LOW	IN	WIN	LOW	IN	ELIM	
5	Clarice	LOW	IN	LOW	HIGH	IN	IN	ELIM		
6	Aaron	LOW	IN	WIN	LOW	ELIM				
7	Caryn	IN	IN	IN	ELIM					
8	Yassmeen	IN	IN	ELIM						
9	Felicia	HIGH	ELIM							
10	Miranda	ELIM								
