= Robert Weinman =

American sculptor

Robert Alexander Weinman (March 19, 1915 – September 7, 2003) was an American sculptor and "one of the nation's most accomplished medallic artists."

Weinman had impeccable credentials as a sculptor, His father, Adolph Weinman, was a well-respected sculptor with whom he apprenticed. He studied at the National Academy of Design studying with Carl Paul Jennewein, Edward McCartan, Gaetano Cecere, Chester Beach, Lee Lawrie and Paul Manship. He also studied at the Art Students League with Arthur Lee. He then apprenticed with James Earle Fraser, Carl Jennewein, and Joseph Kiselewski.

During World War II he joined the US Army Air Forces where he served as a photographer and a photography instructor. At that time he created a statue, Morning Mission that was cast in bronze and now resides at the Tulsa Municipal Airport. Weinman was one of 250 sculptors who exhibited in the 3rd Sculpture International held at the Philadelphia Museum of Art in the summer of 1949. In 1964, Weinman received the American Numismatic Society's J. Sanford Saltus award, a silver medal his father designed, who also received the award in 1920.

Robert Weinman lived in Briarcliff Manor, New York, and his children attended school in the Briarcliff Manor Union Free School District.
