= Susan Bassett =

American swimmer

- Bassett at 18, as all-county basketball honoree

Current position
- Title: Athletic director
- Team: Ithaca
- Conference: Liberty League

Biographical details
- Born: c. 1957; New York, U.S.
- Education: Ithaca College (1979)

Playing career

Swimming
- late 1970s: Ithaca

Basketball
- late 1970s: Ithaca

Field hockey
- late 1970s: Ithaca
- Positions: Freestyle (swimming); Guard (basketball)

Coaching career (HC unless noted)

Swimming
- 1981–1987: Hobart
- 1987–1995: Union (NY)

Administrative career (AD unless noted)
- 1995–2005: Hobart
- 2005–2013: Carnegie Mellon
- 2013–present: Ithaca

Accomplishments and honors

Championships
- 2 New York State women's (1990, 1994); 1 New York State men's (1995)

Awards
- 3× New York State Swim. Coach of the Year; NCAA Div. III Women's Coach of the Year (1993); Giambrone Service Award (2004); CSCAA 100 Greatest Coaches (2022)

Susan Bassett (born c. 1957) is an American college sports administrator and former swimming coach. She was a competitive swimmer in high school and a swim coach and assistant director of athletics at Union College from 1987 through 1995, where she led the Union men to a New York State Championship in 1995 and the Union women to New York State Championships in 1990 and 1994. She later served as a Director of Athletics at Hobart and William Smith Colleges from 1995 to 2005, Carnegie Mellon University from 2005 to 2013, and then Ithaca College beginning in 2013. She had the distinction in 2022 of being selected to the list of the College Swimming Coaches Association of America's (CSCAA) 100 Greatest Coaches of the Century.

== Education and athletics ==
Bassett attended Briarcliff Manor High School, graduating in June, 1975. She swam for the YWCA Middle "Middies" Swim Team of White Plains, New York, a strong program, which won the regional Young Women's Christian Association's (YWCA) Swimming and Diving Championship from 1971 to 1973 and had won nationally. Swimming for the YWCA Middies in late 1972 at 17, Susan won the 100 freestyle and 100 butterfly events in 1:07.4 and 1:17.7. In 1973, Susan qualified for the Westchester County Indoor Swimming Championships to be held in White Plains in March 1973, improving her 100-yard freestyle swim time to 1:04.9, and the YWCA White Plains "Middies" were considered heavy favorites to win the meet.

While playing Basketball for Briarcliff High in her senior year, the team won the WICC Girls' Basketball championships and Basset was placed on the All-County team of eighteen girls, among whom she was ranked among the top ten. She and Briarcliff teammate Colleen Joyce combined for half of Briarcliff's points, with Susan averaging 13 points a game as a playmaking guard. Bassett also competed in shotput and discus at the WICC Girls Track and Field Championship in May 1975.

=== Ithaca College ===
In the Fall of 1975, during her first semester at Ithaca College, Susan played basketball, received a letter in field hockey, and trained with the swimming team as much as 6000–7000 yards daily. She ran often to build endurance but considered swimming her primary sport.

In December 1975, at the end of her first semester at Ithaca College, Bassett received a number of serious injuries, including a fractured pelvis, and was in critical condition, after becoming the victim of a hit and run accident by an automobile that hit her and a close friend from behind while they were on a walk. She needed months to recover and withdrew from college athletics, but she gradually resumed some of her swimming. Within six months, she resumed her work as head coach of the Briarcliff Municipal Pool.

Bassett graduated from Ithaca College in 1979 with a major and concentration in athletic training.

== Coach and athletic director ==
=== Hobart and William Smith Colleges ===
Bassett coached the swimming teams at Hobart and William Smith Colleges from 1981 to 1987, and returned to the schools serving as Director of Athletics from June 1995 through 2005. At William Smith, as Director of Athletics, she added three new varsity sports programs and helped in the improvement of the Winn-Seeley Gymnasium. She also played an important part in improving the entire College's athletic facilities.

During her time at William Smith, she also served as an assistant coach with the lacrosse and field hockey teams.

Under Bassett's guidance as coach and later director from 1995 to 2005, William Smith won two National Championships, many conference championships and three ECAC titles. Bassett noted that in 2007, 18-20 percent of American Collegiate Athletic Directors among all three NCAA division were women. She also noted that before Title IX, only 1 in 27 women participated in sports. She noted that by 2007, the number was closer to 50% of women. As director, she helped add golf and sailing teams to William Smith, and engineered the peak performance plan which helped athletes reach their potential in athletics, academics, and in their profession.

=== Union College ===
Bassett led Union College swimming team from 1987 to 1995. In her eight years with the men's team, she led them to a New York State Championship in 1995, her last year with the team. The team earned an overall record of 42–20, representing a .677 winning percentage.

In eight years coaching the women's team, Bassett earned a notable overall record of 63–10, earning a noteworthy .863 winning percentage, and led the team to its first New York State Title in 1990, and again in 1994, when the team completed a rare perfect 9–0 season. Forty-two Union women swimmers qualified for NCAA national meets, with twenty earning All-American honors. Union's single women swimmer to win an NCAA National Championship was Julie Benker in 1993, swimming the 100-backstroke, and she held the Union record for both the 100 and 200 backstroke for nearly 25 years after her graduation. After her swimming career ended, Benker coached the University of Rochester from 1996 through 2003 and then Roger Williams University from 2003 through 2011. The women's swim team at Union qualified for the NCAA Division III championships during each of Bassett's eight seasons, and had three consecutive Division III top ten finishes between 1992 and 1994. As a testimony to her achievements, Bassett was named the College Swimming Coaches Association of America's (CSCAA) NCAA Division III Co-Coach of the year in 1993.

=== Carnegie Mellon, Ithaca College ===
Bassett served as Director of Athletics at Carnegie Mellon University from 2005 to 2013. In September 2007, while at Carnegie-Mellon, she was honored with 25 women at the annual fund raiser of the Women and Girls Foundation for her role in furthering women's sports among honorees in Southwest Pennsylvania. During her time as athletic director at Carnegie Mellon, the Tartans enjoyed considerable success in the University Athletic Association (UAA) and NCAA conferences as the women's soccer team made it to the elite 8 in NCAA competition, and the women's tennis, men's basketball, track and football teams qualified for and participated in the NCAA Championship.

Leaving her post at Carnegie Mellon in 2013, she began serving as Director of Intercollegiate Athletics at Ithaca College, her former alma mater, in July, 2013, where she has remained. During the first seven years Bassett served as Athletic Director at Ithaca, from 2013-2020, Paula Miller served as the Women's Head swimming Coach. An exceptional coach, Miller amassed an overall record of 334-61-3 in her 36 seasons with Ithaca College from 1984-2020. Bassett, like Miller, was also a recipient of CSCAA's 100 greatest swimming and diving coaches of the past 100 years. While at Ithaca, Bassett helped the college move from the Empire 8 conference to the stronger, more recognized Liberty League beginning in 2017–18. During her time at Ithaca, she was promoted to the position of associate vice president in Student Affairs in 2017–8, retaining her position as athletic director and in campus recreation. During her tenure, Bassett helped obtain improvements to Butterfield Stadium and received a gift to transition the field from a natural grass surface to a synthetic playing field. She received one of the first gifts to improve Ithaca's aquatics pavilion.

== Swimming community roles ==
Bassett served on the NCAA Management Council from 1999 to 2004, chairing the Council in 2004, where she helped develop and pass a broad reform package that was adopted at the 2004 NCAA convention. She was also elected to the board National Association of Collegiate Women Athletics Administrators in 2003.

=== Honors ===
Bassett was a three-time New York State Swimming Coach of the Year at Union College and was a 1993 NCAA Division III Women's Coach of the Year for the Union College Women. She also received the Giambrone Service Award in 2004 for her work with the Union College Women, and as an athletic director. Recognized nationally for her work as an athletics director, in June 2010, she received the honor of being recognized as the Under Armour Athletics Director of the Year for the United States Central Region. She was inducted into the Union College Athletic Hall of Fame in 2007, and William Smith College's Heron Hall of Fame in 2012. In 2022, in a rare honor, she was named to the list of the College Swimming Coaches Association of America's (CSCAA) 100 Greatest Coaches of the Century.
