= Paula Miller (swim coach) =

American swimming coach for Ithaca College, (1951-)

Biographical details
- Born: circa 1951; Canton, Massachusetts
- Education: Bridgewater State College '73; Indiana State MA

Playing career
- 1969-1973: Bridgewater State College
- Position: Freestyle

Coaching career (HC unless noted)
- 1973-1974: Indiana State (Asst. Coach)
- 1974-1976: University of Arkansas
- 1976-1978: Springfield College
- 1978-1984: California State University
- 1984-2020: Ithaca College

Head coaching record
- Overall: 334-61-3 84 % wins (Ithaca College)

Accomplishments and honors

Awards
- NCAA Div. III Coach of Year 1987, 1989 (Ithaca College); Bridgewater College Hall of Fame 1990; Ithaca College Hall of Fame 2014; 100 Greatest Coaches of the Century 2021

Paula C. Stockus Miller (born 1951), formerly known as Paula Stockus before her marriage around 1981, was a competitive swimmer for Bridgewater State College and a swim coach for New York's Ithaca College from 1984-2020 where she guided the team to 30 conference championships including 17 championships in the Empire 8 Conference. Miller was an NCAA Division III Coach of the Year in 1987 and 1999, and was voted to a list of the 100 greatest swimming coaches of the century by the American Swimming Coaches Association in 2022.

Paula C. Stockus was born into a large family in 1951 in Canton, Massachusetts, to Winifred B. and Albert A. "Gus" Stockus. Never far from water, she lived her early life by a nearby lakefront. Showing early speed while leading the Quincy YMCA to a narrow victory in March, 1966, she set a local 13-14 age group record of 1:01.9 for the 100-yard freestyle at the New England Girls Swimming Championships at the Holyoke YMCA in greater Springfield.

== Bridgewater State College ==
She attended and swam for Bridgewater State College from 1969-1973, where she was the only woman on the team, and would compete in the Association for Intercollegiate Athletics for Women (AIAA) National Tournament. In February, 1972, swimming for Bridgewater in New London against Connecticut College, she won the 50-freestyle with a time of 27.6, and the 100 freestyle with a time of 1:01.5. In the 1973 season, her senior year, she had an NCAA Division rating of 13th in both the 50 and 100 freestyle events. While at Bridgewater, she held the school record in both the 100 and 200 freestyle events, though both have since been broken.

== Coaching ==
Miller began her coaching career as an Assistant Coach at Indiana State University where she helped train the team from 1973–74 and earned a Master's degree.

She coached the women's swim team at the University of Arkansas, Fayetteville, from 1974–76, where she led her swimmers to a second place finish in the Arkansas State women's meet in 1974 and would place second again during Miller's coaching tenure. Despite their achievement, Miller attributed a lackluster dual meet record in 1975, to a small team of only seventeen, less than half the size of several competing teams. Miller was also unable to grant athletic aid or swimming scholarships to team members, an option available to several competing swim teams, particularly Oklahoma State. Miller's October 1975 Arkansas swim team had several strong swimmers including Cheryl Darling, a Senior holding two unbroken State records for the 200 IM and 50-yard backstroke, and also had a highly competitive diving team expected to place high in state competition.

From 1976-1978, Miller coached at Springfield College, where she was mentored for two seasons by Hall of Fame Head Coach Charles Silvia, who authored seven books on swimming, and was a 1956 Olympic Coach. Silvia mentored as many as 50 future collegiate coaches among his swimmers and Assistant Coaches, and ended his long tenure at Springfield College in 1978. He was influenced by his own Coach, Dr. Thomas K. Cureton, who emphasized endurance training as being more valuable than mastering mechanical skills for athletes.

Miller had a longer stint at Sacramento's California State University (CSU) from August, 1978 through August, 1984 where she reported to Athletic Director, Dr. Irene Shea. At California State, she inherited a program that was suffering from lack of funding in 1978, yet led the women's team to break 10 women's school records in the 1982 season. By the 1981 season, she led the CSU Sacramento Hornet's men's teams to break all of the standing men's school records. Despite being unable to award scholarships at CSU, she revitalized the program and improved the record of both the men's and women's team's in dual meets. Focusing on training intensity at CSU Sacramento, her swim teams had both an early morning and afternoon practice available six days a week. Continuing to swim recreationally while a coach at California State, Miller completed a 13-mile swim in Lake Tahoe in 1982.

=== Ithaca College coach ===
While coaching the women's swimming and diving team at Ithaca College from 1984 through her retirement in 2020, she led the Bombers swim teams to 12 top-10 finishes at NCAA Division III national Championships, had her swimmers capture 29 NYSWCAA/UNYSCSA titles and won a total of 30 conference championships. During her 36 year tenure at Ithaca College, she had 11 undefeated seasons in dual meets, which includes four consecutive years from 2010-2014 where the team did not experience a loss. By 2014 at Ithaca, Miller had captured 19 New York State championships, and nine New York State Women's Collegiate Athletic Association (NYSWCAA)/Upper New York State Collegiate Swimming Association (UNYSCSA) Conference Coach of the Year awards. After July 2013, Miller worked under Ithaca's Collegiate Athletic Director Susan Bassett, an Ithaca alumni, who had a distinguished fifteen year career as a swim coach, before becoming an athletic administrator. Bassett, like Miller, was also a recipient of CSCAA's 100 greatest swimming and diving coaches of the past 100 years.

Among her most accomplished athletes during her coaching tenure at Ithaca were Nickie Griesmer, a 2018 NCAA diving champion, and the college's first national individual diving champion, and 1989 100 backstroke champion Amy Robinson. Other outstanding swimmers included Maria Ampula, who earned 28 All-America honors from 1991–94, while 25 All-America honors were earned by 500-yard freestyle champion Renee Helbok from 1996–99, Dawn Schmalzriedt from 1991–94 and Nancy Stapp from 1985-89. From 1992-1995, Julie Smith received 21 All America honors.

Miller received the honor of being named the NCAA Division III Coach of the Year in 1987 and 1999. In her lengthy career, she mentored and trained 78 student-athletes to a total of 496 All-America honors. Nine members of her swim teams were admitted to the Ithaca College Athletic Hall of Fame. Her overall record in 36 seasons with Ithaca College was 334-61-3.

Miller met her husband Harry Craig Miller while both worked as Summer Youth Camp Directors at a camp on the East Coast, and married around 1980. They had a long marriage and had one son together.

Miller formally announced her retirement from swim coaching at Ithaca College in June 2020. She continued to volunteer with the team after her retirement.

=== Honors ===
Miller became a member of the Bridgewater State College Athletic Hall of Fame in October, 1990 and became an Ithaca College Athletic Hall of Fame inductee in 2014. In December 2021, she was announced as a member of the American Swimming Coaches Association (ASCA) 100 Greatest Coaches of the Century.
