= Food Network Star season 14 =

Food Network Star
- Season 14
- No. of contestants: 12
- Winners: Christian Petroni and Jess Tom
- No. of episodes: 9

Release
- Original network: Food Network
- Original release: June 10 – August 5, 2018

Season chronology
- ← Previous; Season 13

The fourteenth season of the American reality television series titled Food Network Star premiered on June 10, 2018 on Food Network. Food Network chefs Bobby Flay and Giada de Laurentiis returned as judges.

== Contestants ==
=== Winners ===
- Christian Petroni - Port Chester, New York
- Jess Tom - Princeton, New Jersey

=== Runner-up ===
- Manny Washington - Orlando, Florida

=== Eliminated ===
(in order of elimination)

- Jason Goldstein - New York, New York
- Chris Valdes - Miami, Florida
- Samone Lett - Sanford, Florida
- Rebekah Lingenfelser - Savannah, Georgia
- Adam Gertler - Los Angeles, California
- Harrison Bader - Los Angeles, California
- ~~Jess Tom - Princeton, New Jersey~~ (returned to the competition after winning Star Salvation)
- Katie Dixon - Hattiesburg, Mississippi
- Palak Patel - New York, New York
- Amy Pottinger - Honolulu, Hawaii

== Contestant progress ==
Contestant	Week								
Contestant	1	2	3	4	5	6	7	8	9
Mentor; Challenge	N/A	Adam; Jess	N/A	Jess	Amy	Manny	Amy	Jess; Manny	N/A
Christian	IN	HIGH	HIGH	HIGH	LOW	HIGH	HIGH	LOW	WINNER
Jess	HIGH	HIGH	LOW	HIGH	OUT			IN	WINNER
Manny	IN	LOW	HIGH	HIGH	HIGH	LOW	HIGH	IN	RUNNER-UP^{1}
Amy	HIGH	LOW	LOW	LOW	LOW	HIGH	LOW	OUT	
Palak	HIGH	HIGH	IN	LOW	HIGH	LOW	OUT		
Katie	HIGH	HIGH	IN	HIGH	HIGH	OUT			
Harrison	HIGH	IN	HIGH	OUT					
Adam	IN	HIGH	IN	OUT					
Rebekah	LOW	IN	OUT						
Samone	HIGH	OUT							
Jason	OUT								
Chris	OUT								

^1: Manny was eliminated midway through the finale.

(WINNER) The contestant won the competition and thus became the next Food Network Star.
(RUNNER-UP) The contestant made it to the finale, but did not win.
(HIGH) The contestant was one of the selection committee's favorites for that week.
(IN) The contestant performed well enough to move on to the next week.
(LOW) The contestant was one of the selection committee's least favorites for that week, but was not eliminated.
(OUT) The contestant was the selection committee's least favorite for that week, and was eliminated.

== Comeback Kitchen ==
=== Contestants ===
- Trace Barnett, Season 13
- Adam Gertler, Season 4
- Debbie Lee, Season 5
- Yaku Moton-Spruill, Season 12
- Sarah Penrod, Season 10
- Amy Pottinger, Season 13
- Monterey Salka, Season 12
- Jernard Wells, Season 12

=== Contestant progress ===
Contestant	Week		
Contestant	1	2	3
Adam	IN	LOW	WIN
Amy	HIGH	HIGH	WIN
Jernard	IN	LOW	OUT^{3}
Sarah	LOW	HIGH	OUT^{3}
Yaku	LOW	HIGH	OUT^{2}
Trace	HIGH	OUT	
Debbie	HIGH	OUT^{1}	
Monterey	OUT		

== Star Salvation ==
This season of Star Salvation is hosted by Alex Guarnaschelli.^{4}

=== Contestant progress ===
Contestant	Week			
Contestant	1	2	3	4
Jess		IN	IN	WIN
Harrison	IN	IN	IN	OUT
Chris	IN	IN	IN	OUT
Palak				OUT
Katie			OUT	
Jason	IN	OUT		
Samone	OUT			
Rebekah	OUT			

== Notes ==
1. Debbie was eliminated after the mentor challenge.
2. Yaku was eliminated after the mentor challenge.
3. Sarah and Jernard were eliminated after the star challenge.
4. Adam did not participate in Star Salvation.
