= Pleasantville High School (New York) =

Public school in New York, United States

Pleasantville High School, Pleasantville, New York
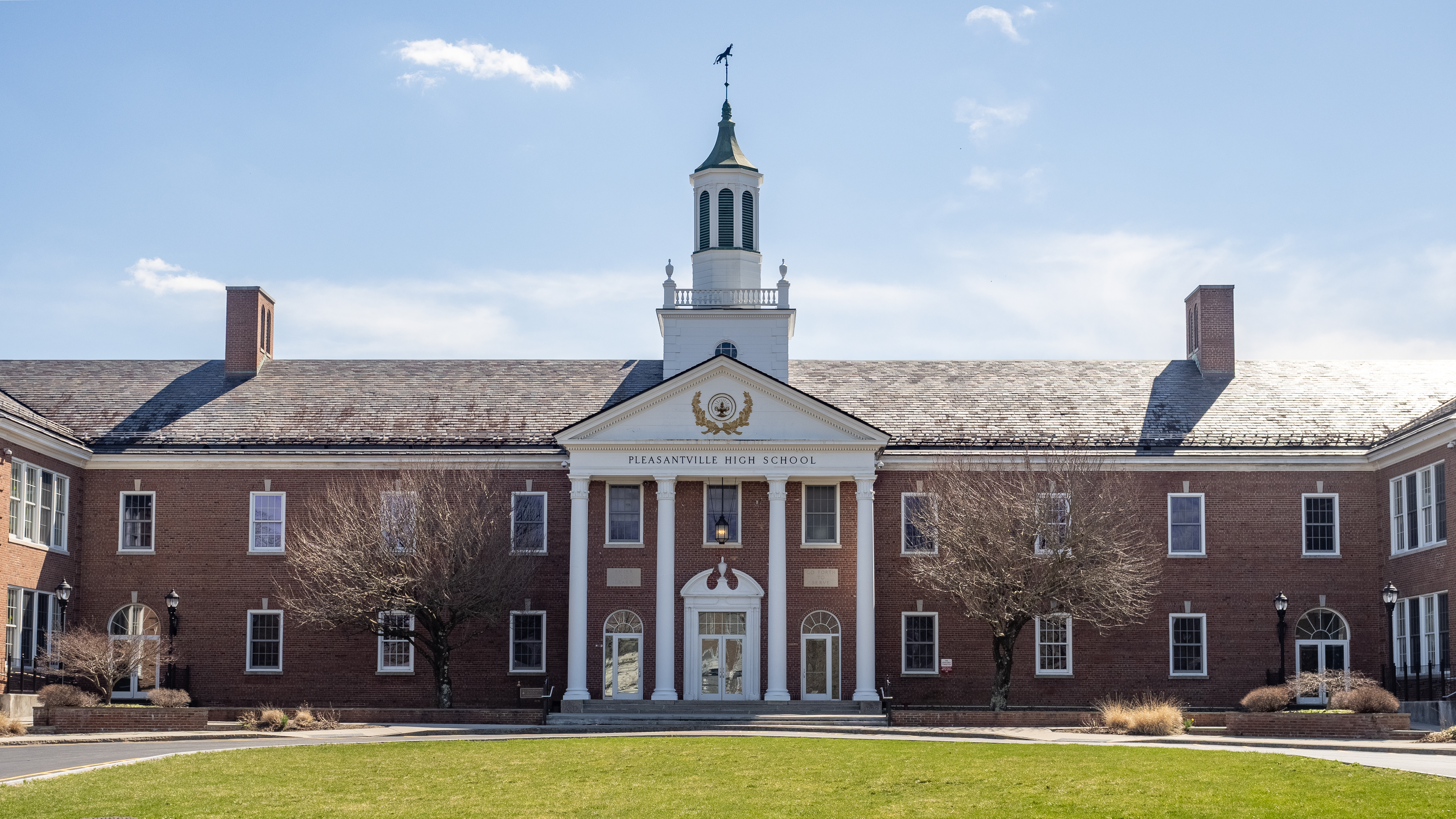
- (2024)

Location
- 60 Romer Avenue; Pleasantville, New York; Pleasantville, New York, Westchester, New York 10570; United States; 41°07′58″N 73°47′05″W

Information
- Type: Public
- Motto: "Enter to learn, go forth to serve"
- School district: Pleasantville Union Free School District
- Principal: Joseph Palumbo
- Faculty: 52.62 (on FTE basis)
- Grades: 9 to 12
- Enrollment: 593 (2022-2023)
- Student to teacher ratio: 11.25
- Colors: Green and white
- Athletics conference: Section 1 (NYSPHSAA)
- Team name: Panthers
- Rival: Westlake High School
- Website: hs.pleasantvilleschools.org

Pleasantville High School is in the village of Pleasantville within the town of Mount Pleasant in Westchester County, New York, United States. It is a comprehensive high school that provides a broad range of academic and educational programs. A full complement of extra-curricular activities are available, including the performing and visual arts, sports, and academic and service clubs. The high school was ranked 122nd on Newsweek's 2015 list of top U.S. high schools.

The Pleasantville High School football team has been in existence at least since 1922 and has won one state championship and many county titles. In 2013 the football team won the Section 1 Class B title with a win over Our Lady of Lourdes. The 2016 team won a Regional Championship, defeating New Paltz High School 56-20 before falling in the State Semi-Finals. The 2017 Panthers football team won the Class B NYSPHSAA Championship defeating Chenango Forks High School 28-14 at the Carrier Dome in Syracuse. This was the first State Championship in program history. Just months later many of the same athletes won their second State Championship in the school year winning the NYSPHSAA Lacrosee Championship by a score of 16-2 over Penn Yan Academy. In 2019, the girls' varsity soccer team won the state championship after defeating Central Valley Academy in a close 3-2 victory. In 2021, Pleasantville High School's football team made it to the state championship again, but was defeated 21-12 by Maine-Endwell.

The men's basketball team has also won several county championships. The Pleasantville swim team has won the Division 1 championship twice, most recently in 2007. The Pleasantville track team has also won the league title two years in a row.

Pleasantville High School’s theater program has put on a musical every year since 1975; the program has been remarkably successful in terms of both community involvement and county-level awards. Students and community members report that the play is a “big deal” at PHS and that participation is high, whether through membership in the cast, crew, or production team. Productions typically have a much larger-than-usual budget due to a combination of a greater allocation from the school board and a high level of contributions from the community. The Metropolitan High School Theater Awards, an annual awards show designed to promote high school theater in Westchester, Rockland, Putnam, and Bergen counties, has awarded PHS a litany of nominations and wins since its inception in 1999.

== Notable alumni ==
- Matt Ballinger, musician, member of the band Dream Street
- Dave Barry, author and columnist
- Ali Ewoldt, actor
- Otis Hill, basketball player
- Kyle Lowder, actor
- Bhaskar Sunkara, writer and publisher
- Jessica Tom, winner of Food Network Star season 14
- Mark Ambor, musician
- Aaron Maine, musician, founder of the band Porches
