= Food Network Star season 13 =

Food Network Star
- Season 13
- No. of contestants: 13
- Winner: Jason Smith
- No. of episodes: 11

Release
- Original network: Food Network
- Original release: June 4 – August 13, 2017

Season chronology
- ← Previous; Season 12 Next → Season 14

The thirteenth season of the American reality television series Food Network Star premiered June 4, 2017 on Food Network. Food Network chefs Bobby Flay and Giada de Laurentiis returned to the series as judges.

== Contestants ==
=== Winner ===
- Jason Smith – Grayson, Kentucky

=== Runners-up ===
- Rusty Hamlin – Atlanta, Georgia
- Cory Bahr – Monroe, Louisiana

=== Eliminated ===
(in order of elimination)

- Blake Baldwin – Flemington, New Jersey
- Nancy Manlove – Texas City, Texas
- Toya Boudy – New Orleans, Louisiana
- Suzanne Lossia – Detroit, Michigan
- Trace Barnett – Brilliant, Alabama
- Caodan Tran – Dallas, Texas
- Addie Gundry – Lake Forest, Illinois
- David Rose – Atlanta, Georgia
- ~~Cory Bahr – Monroe, Louisiana~~ (returned to the competition after winning Star Salvation)
- Amy Pottinger – Honolulu, Hawaii
- Matthew Grunwald – Scottsdale, Arizona

== Contestant progress ==
Contestant	Week										
Contestant	1	2	3	4	5	6	7	8	9	10	11
Mentor; Challenge	N/A	N/A	N/A	N/A	Matthew; Addie	Amy	Jason^{1}	Amy	Matthew	Cory; Jason	N/A
Jason	HIGH	IN	HIGH	HIGH	HIGH	HIGH	HIGH	HIGH	IN	IN	WINNER
Rusty	IN	IN	IN	LOW	HIGH	HIGH	HIGH	HIGH	LOW	LOW	RUNNER-UP
Cory	IN	HIGH	IN	IN	IN	LOW	IN	OUT		IN	RUNNER-UP^{2}
Matthew	IN	LOW	IN	IN	HIGH	LOW	HIGH	HIGH	IN	OUT	
Amy	HIGH	HIGH	HIGH	IN	HIGH	LOW	LOW	LOW	OUT		
David	IN	IN	HIGH	HIGH	LOW	LOW	OUT				
Addie	IN	HIGH	IN	LOW	IN	OUT					
Caodan	HIGH	LOW	LOW	HIGH	OUT						
Trace	IN	HIGH	LOW	OUT							
Suzanne	IN	IN	OUT								
Toya	LOW	OUT									
Nancy	LOW	OUT									
Blake	OUT										

^1 : Cory did not compete in the mentor challenge.
^2 : Cory was eliminated midway through the finale.

(WINNER) The contestant won the competition and thus became the next Food Network Star.
(RUNNER-UP) The contestant made it to the finale, but did not win.
(HIGH) The contestant was one of the selection committee's favorites for that week.
(IN) The contestant performed well enough to move on to the next week.
(LOW) The contestant was one of the selection committee's least favorites for that week, but was not eliminated.
(OUT) The contestant was the selection committee's least favorite for that week, and was eliminated.

== Comeback Kitchen ==
=== Contestants ===
- Rob Burmeister, Season 12
- Danushka Lysek, Season 9
- Emilia Cirker, Season 11
- Jamika Pessoa, Season 5
- Josh Lyons, Season 8
- Joy Thompson, Season 12
- Matthew Grunwald, Season 11

=== Contestant progress ===
Contestant	Week		
Contestant	1	2	3
Matthew	HIGH	WIN	WIN
Jamika	HIGH	LOW	OUT
Joy	HIGH	WIN	OUT^{2}
Danushka	LOW	LOW	OUT^{2}
Rob	HIGH	WIN	OUT^{1}
Emilia	LOW	OUT	
Josh	OUT		

^1 : Rob was eliminated after the mentor challenge.
^2 : Danushka and Joy were eliminated after the star challenge.

(WIN) The contestant won "Comeback Kitchen".
(WIN) The contestant won the challenge for that week.
(HIGH) The contestant did well in the challenge for that week.
(LOW) The contestant was up for elimination, but was safe.
(OUT) The contestant was eliminated.

== Star Salvation ==
This season of Star Salvation was hosted by Iron Chef Alex Guarnaschelli and season 7 winner Jeff Mauro.

=== Contestant progress ===
Contestant	Week					
Contestant	1	2	3	4	5	6
Cory					IN	WIN
Amy						OUT
David				IN	IN	OUT
Addie			IN	IN	OUT	
Trace	IN	IN	IN	OUT		
Toya	IN	IN	OUT			
Caodan		OUT				
Blake	IN	OUT				
Nancy	OUT					
Suzanne	OUT					

(WIN) The chef won Star Salvation and returned to the main competition.
(IN) The chef continued in the competition.
(OUT) The chef lost in that week's Star Salvation and was eliminated from the competition.
