= Jess Tom =

American chef

- Born: Jessica Tom; March 24, 1984 (age 42); Queens, New York City, New York, United States
- Website: www.jessicatom.com

Jessica Tom (born March 24, 1984) is an American television personality and food writer who came to prominence as the joint winner of the fourteenth season of the Food Network television series Food Network Star (along with Christian Petroni).

== Personal life ==
Tom's mother is from Madagascar while her father is from China. She has cousins by the names of Jonathan and Grace. She has been married since 2016 and she publicly refers to her husband only as "D".
