= Food Paradise season 9 =

Food Paradise
- Season 9
- No. of episodes: 13

Release
- Original network: Travel Channel
- Original release: October 16, 2016 – January 15, 2017

Season chronology
- ← Previous; Season 8 Next → Season 10

The ninth season of Food Paradise, an American food reality television series narrated by Jess Blaze Snider (formally Mason Pettit) on the Travel Channel, premiered on October 16, 2016. First-run episodes of the series aired in the United States on the Travel Channel on Mondays at 10:00 p.m. EDT. The season contained 13 episodes and concluded airing on January 15, 2017.

Food Paradise features the best places to find various cuisines at food locations across America. Each episode focuses on a certain type of restaurant, such as "Diners", "Bars", "Drive-Thrus" or "Breakfast" places that people go to find a certain food specialty.

== Episodes ==
=== Taco-Lanche! ===
Restaurant	Location	Specialty(s)
Torchy's Tacos	Austin, Texas	"Trailer Park-Hillbilly Style Tacos" – three flour tortillas filled with deep-fried chicken tenders, chorizo sausage and Applewood-smoked bacon, topped with creamy queso made with house-made salsa, New Mexican green chilies, heavy cream and cheese; pico de gallo, and ranch dressing made with mayo, ranch seasoning, buttermilk, poblano peppers, and green serrano peppers. "Ace of Spades" – flour tortilla filled with butter-seared jalapeño sausage, smoked beef brisket, a fried egg, topped with creamy queso, sour cream and "Diablo Sauce" made with vegetable oil, diced onions, garlic, habanero peppers, tomato sauce, vinegar, and salt, and garnished with cilantro.
Tacolicious	The Mission, San Francisco, California	"Shot and a Beer Braised Taco" – four corn tortillas filled with over-roasted shredded chicken thighs in a sauce of chipotle and ancho chilies, smoke jalapeños, habaneros, oregano, cumin, salt, tomatoes, beer, and a shot of tequila, topped with diced raw onions and cilantro, served with three sauces on the side. "Guajillo Braised Beef Short Rib Taco" – corn tortillas filled with seared short ribs with salt and pepper, braised, shredded and topped with a sauce made with guajillo and chipotle chilies, sautéed onions, garlic and spices, topped with onions, tomatoes and spicy salsa.
Henry's Puffy Tacos Cantina	San Antonio, Texas	"Spicy Beef Fajita Puffy Taco" – three deep-fried homemade masa flour corn tortillas that puff-up in the oil, filled with skirt steak rubbed in black pepper, garlic powder, chili powder and paprika, marinated in secret hot sauce, flattop-grilled with onions and green bell peppers, and topped with shredded cheese, fresh guacamole and diced tomatoes, served with yellow rice and refried beans.
Arizona Taco Festival	Scottsdale, Arizona	The Mission: "Jidori Chicken Mole Taco" – three homemade charred corn tortillas filled with sliced jidori Japanese chicken, marinated in beer, garlic, lime juice and cilantro, grilled with pecan wood and sauced with a mole made from Oaxacan pasillas, mulatos, burnt mulato seeds, kombu, Indonesian long peppers, Sichuan peppercorns, Marcona almonds, peanuts, pepitas or toasted pumpkin seeds, bonito flakes, honey, thyme, red garlic, golden raisins, oregano, white soy sauce, Worcestershire powder, squid ink, salt, oil, and chicken stock, and topped with cilantro, pickled watermelon radish slices, Cotija cheese, pepitas, and a garnish of chicken skin. "Carne Asada Taco" – corn tortillas filled with carne asada skirt steak marinated in lime juice, arbol chilies, garlic and sugar, pecan wood-grilled, sliced, topped with a coconut chili arbol, roast garlic and cilantro sauce, garnished with sliced avocados, and chili-spiced corn nuts.; Queso Good (quesadilla food truck): "El Gaucho" – corn tortilla filled with butter-seared sliced top sirloin steak in homemade Argentinian chimichurri sauce made with flat leaf parsley, garlic, secret imported chili peppers, white vinegar, and corn oil, topped with mozzarella, fried tattertots, shredded lettuce and diced tomatoes. "Green Chili Beef Taco" – grilled sirloin tip beef in a cumin-based rub, topped with grilled onions and green chilies in a cumin roux and red sauce, pico de gallo, and shredded cheddar and pepperjack cheeses.
Guisados	Los Angeles, California	"Cochinita Pibil Taco" – handmade grilled corn tortilla filled with guisado or braised/stewed pork butt marinated in achiote paste, orange juice, lime juice, salt, pepper, garlic, chopped onions, onion powder, roasted in a pan with banana leaves, topped with black beans, habanero mango salsa, and sweet pickled onions. "Steak Picado Taco" – corn tortillas filled with stewed beef braised with bacon, onions, and bell peppers, topped with black beans, and spicy avocado sauce.
Martin's Bar-B-Que Joint	Nashville, Tennessee	"Redneck Taco" – slow-smoked pulled pork belly, topped with sweet "Dixie Sauce", made with ketchup, vinegar, sugar, cayenne, red pepper flakes, dry mustard and chili powder; homemade coleslaw made with mayo, minced garlic, half-n-half, apple cider vinegar, sugar, chopped green & purple cabbage and carrots served on a hoecake or griddle-drop cornbread made with eggs, black pepper, buttermilk, white cornmeal, and hot pork fat. Catfish Taco – two flour tortillas filled with cornmeal crusted catfish, topped with coleslaw, cilantro, lime juice, jalapeños, and melted shredded cheddar cheese.
Oscar's Mexican Seafood	San Diego, California	Smoked Fish Taco – handmade corn tortilla filled with hickory-smoked and pulled albacore tuna, spiced with granulated garlic, black pepper, mixed with onions, tomatoes and cilantro, seared with butter on the flat-top grill, and topped with shredded cabbage, melt cheese, and three slices of fresh avocado. Spicy Grilled Shrimp Taco – shrimp grilled in house salt, garlic, crushed red peppers, light soy sauce, lime juice and Worcestershire sauce and white wine, topped with cabbage, diced onions, tomatoes, cilantro, avocado, and chipotle mayo, made with granulated garlic, pepper and seasoned salt.

=== Brunch-Nado! ===
Restaurant	Location	Specialty(s)
The Country Cat Dinner House & Bar	Portland, Oregon	"Monte Cristo Sandwich'" – homemade smoked ham, smoked turkey brined in a mixture of citrus, salt and cinnamon, butter lettuce, "Durkee" (mustard-mayo sauce), and "Judy" (grated cheddar, beer, pickle juice, Tabasco, and mayo) on freshly baked oat bread dipped in bourbon custard, topped with house-made strawberry preserves and drizzled with maple syrup and powdered sugar. Slow Burn– pork chili made with smoked pork shoulder pasilla peppers, cascabels chilies, sofrito (puree of tomato, onion, jalapeño peppers, cilantro, lime juice, sugar and secret ingredient: chocolate), served with sunny side-up eggs and corn grits.
Clinton St. Baking Company	New York City, New York	"Mexican Benedict" – steamed tamales made from masa dough, corn flour, chicken stock and melted pork fat, placed into corn husks and stuffed with Oaxaca cheese, roasted poblano peppers, topped with braised guajillo pulled pork made from picante guajillo chili peppers, caramelized onions and tomatoes, roasted garlic, oregano, cumin, apple cider vinegar, salt and black pepper, two poached eggs drizzled with roasted pureed green poblano hollandaise and garnished with cilantro and guajillo sauce. "Hot Buttered Rum" – hot drink made with maple butter, maple syrup, apple cider and cinnamon. Chicken & Waffles – chicken breasts marinated in spices and buttermilk, dredged in cornmeal and flour, deep-fried, served on top of a vanilla sugar lemon zest waffle with a side of maple butter, and drizzled with hot red cayenne sauce mixed with honey, garnished with chives.
The Fifty/50	Chicago, Illinois	"Breakfast Lasagna" – layers of extra wide-cut thinly sliced golden deep-fried potatoes, caramelized onions, thick-cut bacon crumbles, extra sharp shredded cheddar cheese, baked in a cast-iron skillet, topped with an easy-over egg. "Wobble Stopper" – a Bloody Mary consisting of top-shelf vodka, tomato juice, pickle juice, olive juice, Worcestershire sauce, and homemade fine-age hot sauce, with dehydrated corn mixed with barbecue sauce on the rim of the glass. "South in Your Mouth" – southern-style pulled pork in a rice wine vinegar, cumin, sriracha, honey barbecue sauce on top of a cilantro-cornbread waffle made with bacon drippings, roasted corn, and jalapeños, topped with corn relish, two sunny side-up eggs.
Katie's Restaurant & Bar	Mid-City, New Orleans, Louisiana	"Chef Scott's Famous BBQ Shrimp and Grits" – deep-fried local Gulf shrimp stuffed in jumbo U10 scallops, slathered in a barbecue sauce made from Worcestershire sauce, Italian seasoning, bay leaves, roasted garlic, butter, lemon juice, white pepper, Creole seasoning, Spanish paprika and rosemary deep-fried in olive oil, served on top of stone ground corn grits made with heavy cream, milk, butter, salt and Provel cheese. "Brandy Milk Punch" – brandy, crème de cacao, milk and fresh nutmeg, served over ice. "Crawfish Beignet" – pizza dough beignet stuffed with local crawfish, Provel cheese, whole milk mozzarella, Wisconsin cheddar, agave caramelized onions and pickled jalapeños, drizzled with spicy aioli, and garnished with a whole crawfish.
Fat Hen	Charleston, South Carolina	"Duck & Apple Sausage Gratin" – grilled sausage made with duck breast, duck liver and Applewood-smoked bacon, salt, pepper, dried apples in brandy, garlic, shallots, served on top of a crepe, and topped with caramelized onions and liaison (rich thickening sauce made with four egg yolks and a quarter of cream), another crepe on top with pecan-smoked shredded gruyere in a gratin with a sunny side-up egg on top. "French Toast Sandwich" – maple syrup Applewood-smoked bacon sausage patty, a farm-fresh egg, grape jam, smoked Gruyere cheese, between two thick slices of Crème brulee-battered French toast, served with a side of bacon-cheese grits.
Bone Lick BBQ	Atlanta, Georgia	"Hangover Muff" (a.k.a. "The Porkgasm") – slow-smoked pulled pork butt, house-smoked and cured bacon, ham, a sausage patty, two slices of white American cheese and an egg on buttered English muffins. "Wake-Up Juice" – an oversized Bloody Mary topped off with a skewer of a chunk of beef brisket burnt end, a chicken wing and a spare rib and a skewer of pickled peppers. "Sexy-Ass French Toast" – bread pudding, sliced and dipped in batter, and fried, topped with hazelnut spread, whipped cream, homemade maple bacon butter and powdered sugar.
Little Dom's	Los Feliz, Los Angeles, California	"Breakfast Pizza" – a personal pizza with super-thin pizza crust topped with light tomato sauce, fresh mozzarella, a sunny side-up egg, speck or smoked prosciutto, and basil. Butternut Squash Old Fashion – made with butternut bourbon, served over ice. Fried Eggs and Polenta – buckwheat polenta made with cream and butter, topped with sautéed kale, two sunny side-up eggs, and Calabrese butter made with Italian Calabrese peppers garlic and butter, garnished with grated Parmesan cheese.
The Sinclair	Harvard Square, Cambridge, Massachusetts	"Waffle Burger" – char-grilled chuck patty with topped two slices of white cheddar cheese, two fried egg, bacon, onion jam, son thick waffle buns, drizzled with maple syrup, served with a side of fries. "Lobster Sliders" – chunks of lobster, mixed with diced celery, lemon zest, tarragon, parsley, mayo, pickle juice, salt, cracked black pepper, layered with baby kale, on top of two buttery mini buns, with a skewer of sweet & spicy pickles.

=== Super Sandwiches ===
Restaurant	Location	Specialty(s)
Milwaukee Beer Bistro	Milwaukee, Wisconsin	"Beer Braised Short Rib Sandwich" – beef short ribs seared on a flattop with salt and pepper, braised in the oven with local lager, a mix of teriyaki and soy sauce, water, minced garlic red onions, ginger and Thai chili paste, sliced, slathered in a beer barbecue sauce, drizzled with beer cheese sauce, and served on a homemade buttermilk-beer bun, with a skewer of pickles and deep-fried cheese curds on the side.
Bun Mee	San Francisco, California	"The Belly Bun" – a French-Vietnamese banh mi sandwich with pork belly braised with chopped garlic, shallots, fish sauce, water, secret spices, and sweet caramel fish sauce, sliced, and topped with pickled julienned carrots and daikon radish (pickled with vinegar, sugar and Thai bird's eye chilies), sliced cucumbers, jalapeños, cilantro, and sriracha mayo on a toasty baguette roll.
Boatyard Bar & Grill	Annapolis, Maryland	"The Best Crab Cake Sandwich You'll Ever Eat" – broiled 6 ounce lump crab cake (made with Maryland jumbo lump Chesapeake Bay crabmeat, crushed saltines, Old Bay seasoning, fresh parsley and their top-secret crab cake sauce), rolled into baseball size, baked in the oven, topped with lettuce, tomato, and house-made tartar sauce on a brioche roll. "Bay to Table Soft Shell Crab Sandwich" – two 'whale-size' soft shell crab dredged in flour, buttermilk and a panko, corn cereal crumbs and Italian breadcrumb mix, deep-fried and topped with lettuce, tomatoes on grilled ciabatta bread.
Boomwich Brooklyn Heroes	Boerum Hill, Brooklyn, New York	"Chili Con Carne Boomwich" – two-pounds of beef brisket braised with salt, Mexican chocolate, garlic cloves, jalapeños, cumin, cayenne, onion, dehydrated ancho chilies, a ripe banana, cola and ginger ale, pulled and topped with 'gringo mole', house-made burrata (hot water added to mozzarella curd, rolled and stuffed with herb (cilantro, parsley and mint) cream cheese), gremolata (lemon zest, garlic, herbs, fried beet chips), a relish of corn and pickled jalapeños, served on a toasted pretzel brioche bun made by Tom Cat Bakery. "General Tso's Shrimp Boomwich" – shrimp in a club soda flour batter, deep-fried and topped with sweet & tangy General Tso's sauce, fried shallots, broccolata (roasted broccoli mixed with cottage cheese), roasted julienned carrots, served on a toasted Tom Cat roll.
Little Bread Cuban Sandwich Co.	Little Havana, Miami, Florida	"The Best Cuban Sandwich in Miami" – prepared Tampa-style (with salami), pork butt in an overnight brine of fennel seeds, cumin seeds, black peppercorns, and pork fat, smoked for five hours, sliced, and topped with rillettes (a spread of pulled pork, Dijon mustard, spices, and pork fat), smoked ham, salami, Swiss cheese, mustard aioli, and house-made bread & butter pickles, served on a house-baked butter-toasted panini-pressed White Pullman-Cuban roll. "Pulpeta Sandwich" – pulpeta (traditional Cuban meatloaf with ground ham, pork and beef, red peppers, onions, raisins, green olives, cilantro, spices, a cracked egg and panade or cubes of milk-soaked bread), shaped in a loaf and stuffed with a row of hard boiled eggs, sliced cold, heated in oven and topped with a tomato marmalade (made with tomatoes, sugar, coffee beans and rosemary), and mojo onion, melted provolone, served on toasted homemade Pullman bread.
Woodman's of Essex	Essex, Massachusetts	Est. 1914, Birthplace of Fried Clams: "Fried Clam Roll" – 4-5 ounce of clam bellies, dipped in evaporated milk, dredged in corn flour, deep-fried, topped with homemade tartar sauce, and served on a butter-toasted split-top hot dog bun. "Lobster Roll" – fresh-cooked boiled lobsters, 3-4 ounces of lobster meat, chilled, and mixed with mayonnaise, sugar, and apple cider vinegar, served on a butter-toasted split-top sweet bread roll.
The Sammich	New Orleans, Louisiana	"Lobster Po'Boy" – Maine lobster claw and knuckle meat, coated in light tempura batter with salt, pepper, cumin, peanut sauce, sriracha, and cold light beer, deep-fried and topped with homemade tangy mango butter sauce, lettuce and tomatoes, served on local Leidenheimer's French bread. "Barbecue Shrimp Po'Boy" – award-winning sammich; Gulf shrimp cooked in shrimp stock (made with local beer with coffee and caramel notes, Worcestershire sauce, lemon juice, black pepper, thyme, shrimp stock paste, cold butter), topped with avocado mayo, applewood-smoked tomatoes, and lettuce on Leidenheimer's French bread.
Neon Pig Café	Tupelo, Mississippi	"Pork Belly Bun" – three slices of seared pork belly topped with hoisin sauce, sriracha, and 'quick pickles', and chow-chow (fresh pickled vegetable relish), on a flattop grilled Asian-style bun. "Famous Smash Burger" – two patties with a mix of ground local grass-fed beef, aged filet mignon, sirloin, ribeye, New York strip and Benton's Tennessee-style bacon, seasoned with 'Gypsy Dog' seasoning (named after owner's dog: sea salt, smoked salt, kosher salt, paprika, cumin and coriander), smashed on the flattop, and topped with bacon bits, cheddar cheese, quick pickles, pickled red onions, hoisin sauce and 'comeback' sauce (or Mississippi remoulade: mayo, brown mustard, lemon zest, and seasoning) on a toasted ciabatta bun.

=== Pizza Party ===
Restaurant	Location	Specialty(s)
Blind Lady Ale House	San Diego, California	"Chorizo Avocado Pizza" – hand-tossed dough topped with hand-crushed canned tomatoes, salt, pepper, shredded red wax Danish fontina cheese, sliced Anaheim peppers, house-made chorizo meatballs, fresh chopped oregano, baked in the oven until crispy, and garnished with Mexican Cotija cheese, epazote (a bitter Spanish herb), and sliced avocado.
Tony's Brick Oven Pizzeria	Gulfport, Mississippi	"Gumbo Pizza" – dough topped with gumbo sauce (made with a roux of butter, olive oil and flour; trinity of onions, red peppers and green bell pepper, water, salt, pepper, gumbo filé (powdered sassafras leaves), red pepper flakes, basil, thyme and oregano), hand-crushed tomatoes, roasted Gulf shrimp, sliced andouille sausage, okra, and mozzarella cheese, baked in a brick oven.
Little Star Pizza	San Francisco, California	"Little Star Deep-Dish" – a Chicago-inspired deep dish pizza with cornmeal dough in a pan lined with butter, layered with fresh shredded whole milk mozzarella, 'the mix' (spinach, ricotta and feta cheese, and spices), mushrooms, yellow onions, chopped garlic, tomato sauce on top and a dusting of Parmesan cheese, and the crust is drizzled with olive oil, baked in the oven and garnished with oregano. "Chicken Pesto Thin-Crust Pizza" – cornmeal dusted dough topped with garlic-infused extra virgin olive oil, shredded mozzarella, grilled chicken chunks, sliced mushrooms and onions, baked and drizzled with pesto (fresh basil, olive oil and garlic), and garnished with Parmesan and oregano.
Buddy's Pizza	Detroit, Michigan	Detroit Style Pizza: "The Detroiter" – homemade dough topped with shredded mozzarella cheese, chunky tomato sauce (made with fresh tomatoes, garlic and basil), Margherita peperoni (made with fennel), shredded Parmesan cheese, and signature 'Sicilian spice', baked in a square steel pan and cut into eight square slices.
Bru Room at Bar	New Haven, Connecticut	"Mashed Potato and Bacon Pizza" – thin-crust dough topped with clumps of mashed potatoes, shredded mozzarella, bacon bits, Parmesan cheese, fresh chopped garlic, and oregano, drizzled with olive oil and water, baked in a brick oven and sliced. "Clams Casino Pizza" – thin-crust dough topped with shredded mozzarella, freshly shucked local clams, chopped onions and green bell peppers, Parmesan and bacon bits, and drizzled with olive oil and water, and baked in the brick oven.
Pizza Brain Museum of Pizza Culture	Philadelphia, Pennsylvania	"Biscuits and Gravy Pizza" (a.k.a. "Lillian Lee") – massive thin-crust dough topped with red eye gravy (made with local ReAnimator coffee, thick-cut bacon, bacon fat, butter, milk, black pepper, and flour), shredded mozzarella, white cheddar, fennel sausage, baked in the oven, and garnished with house-made ham and leek buttermilk biscuit crumbles and scallions. "Backyard Barbecue Pizza" – large thin-crust dough topped with baked beans, shredded cheddar, hot dog chunks, baked in the oven, layered with purple cabbage coleslaw, garnished with potato chips, and yellow mustard.
Joe Squared	Baltimore, Maryland	"Corned Beef and Potato Irish Pizza" – square thin-crust pizza sourdough topped with roasted garlic sauce (made with fresh garlic, olive oil, Parmesan, Romano cheese and heavy cream), caramelized onions, shredded mozzarella, provolone cheese, house-made corned beef, deep-fried potatoes, and shredded Jarlsberg Swiss cheese, and baked in an anthracite coal fire oven. "Meatball and Spaghetti Pizza" – square thin-crust dough topped with house-made marina sauce (made with Italian tomatoes, mozzarella, provolone, meatballs, spaghetti, roasted red peppers, and Vidalia onions, and a dusting of grated Parmesan, Pecorino Romano and Asiago cheeses, garnished with oregano.
Dimo's Pizza	Wicker Park, Chicago, Illinois	"Chicken and Waffles Pizza" – thin crust hand-tossed dough topped with shredded mozzarella, white sauce (made from buttermilk, heavy cream, garlic and onions), deep-fried chicken thigh chunks (marinated in buttermilk, salt and black pepper, dredged in flour and white pepper), waffles chunks (made with a batter of egg whites, canola oil, egg yolks, buttermilk, all-purpose flour, cornmeal, baking powder, Old Bay seasoning, Wisconsin cheddar cheese and green onions), baked in the oven, and drizzled with butter and honey. "Chilaquiles Pizza" – (inspired by a Mexican brunch dish with leftover ingredients), thin-crust dough topped with shredded mozzarella, white sauce, totopos (tortilla chips tossed in homemade salsa roja—a four-chili sauce made with ancho, guajillo, chipotle, and California chilies), in-house chorizo (made with fresh ground pork, spices and chili pepper paste), baked and drizzled with scrambled eggs, salsa verde, and crumbled queso fresco.

=== Southern Comfort Food ===
Restaurant	Location	Specialty(s)
The Flying Harpoon	Gulf Shores, Alabama	Crab & Crawfish Cakes – crab meat, crawfish tails mixed together with bread chunks, salt, dry mustard, onion powder, blackening seasoning, roasted red peppers, scallions, eggs, and buttermilk, deep-fried and drizzled with remoulade made with ketchup, mayo, lime and lemon juice, cayenne and olive juice. Cajun Cornbread – yellow corn flour, salt, baking soda, half-dozen eggs, sweet cream corn, diced onions, red & green peppers, and jalapeños, blend of cheddar and Monterey jack cheeses, and a pound of wild-caught crawfish, spiced with salt, garlic powder, and cayenne, baked in a square pan, plated and topped with a poached egg.
Hot Suppa!	Portland, Maine	Pulled Pork Mac & Cheese – pulled pork butt slow-cooked with red oak pellets, rubbed with chili powder, paprika, onion & mustard powder, cayenne, ground fennel, coriander, black pepper and cumin, served over mac & cheese made with melted butter, condensed milk, mustard powder, sriracha, caramelized onions, and two types of cheddar cheese; local cheddar from Pineland Farms and Cabot cheddar from Vermont over elbow macaroni, garnished with crispy fried onions and scallions.
Puckett's Grocery and Restaurant	Nashville, Tennessee	"Bubba's Bones" – rack of pork ribs rubbed with brown sugar, paprika, black peppers and a secret pepper spice mix, Cherrywood-smoked, deep-fried, cut, and slathered with a barbecue sauce made with local honey, Louisiana hot sauce and tomato sauce, served with country coleslaw. "Redneck Burritos" – large grilled flour tortilla stuffed with Cherrywood smoked pulled pork, coleslaw, house-made baked beans, and homemade barbecue sauce.
Lunch.Supper!	Richmond, Virginia	"The Herd" – signature meatloaf made with ground pork, ground bison, and ground beef brisket, smoked & toasted oats, black pepper, cumin, thyme, cayenne, and smoked salt, a secret sauce made with caramelized onions, sautéed carrots, green & red peppers, and diced bacon, shaped into balls, bacon-wrapped and drizzled with a honey-bourbon glaze, made with ketchup, honey and bourbon, served with sautéed Brussels sprouts and homemade mashed potatoes.
Bon Ton Café	New Orleans, Louisiana	Crawfish Etouffée – one pound crawfish tails smothered in a sauce made from butter, onions, green onions, garlic, secret blend of Cajun seasoning, black pepper, salt, cayenne, and fresh chopped parsley, served with white rice. Soft-Shell Crab Alvin – flour and deep-fried softshell crab, topped with local blueclaw crab meat sautéed in white wine, butter and parsley, and smothered in a sauce made with beef stock, butter, flour, chopped mushrooms, salt, pepper, lemon juice.
Hoover's Cooking	Austin, Texas	Texas Chili Burger – beef patty smoked and char-grilled, topped with beef chili made with smoked sausage, hamburger meat, chopped onions, garlic, jalapeños, diced tomatoes, chili powder, cumin, cayenne pepper; cheddar cheese, raw onions, and pickled jalapeños on a toasted sweet bun. Chicken-Fried Steak – beef shoulder, tenderized, double-dipped in egg batter and seasoned flour, and fried in a cast-iron skillet, slathered with white gravy made with chicken stock, whole milk, bacon drippings, vegetable oil, flour, chicken base, black pepper, onion powder, and garlic powder.
Page's Okra Grill	Charleston, South Carolina	Shrimp and Grits – grits, made with cornmeal butter, shredded sharp cheddar and jack cheeses, and heavy cream, shaped into triangle cakes, floured and deep-fried, topped with local sautéed shrimp slathered with a sauce made with rendered bacon grease, chopped onion, green peppers and Cajun andouille sausage, shrimp stock, salt, pepper, cayenne, Cajun seasoning and heavy cream, and flour, garnished with scallions. "PBT" (pimento cheese, bacon and tomato sandwich) – two slice of Texas toast, layered with pimento cheese made with mayo, roasted red peppers, extra-sharp shredded cheddar and pepper jack cheeses, diced pickled jalapeños, salt, pepper, granulated garlic and cream cheese, topped with Applewood smoked bacon, fried green tomatoes, breaded with Italian breadcrumbs, capped with an okra.
Biscuit Head	Asheville, North Carolina	Home of "Cathead Biscuits" (a drop biscuit the size of a cat's head): "Mimosa Fried Chicken Biscuit" – chicken breasts marinated in orange juice, champagne, and secret spices, floured and deep-fried, served on top of a giant biscuit made from flour, baking powder, salt, butter, and whole-fat buttermilk, topped with sweet potato chive butter, made with roasted sweet potatoes, brown sugar, and chive spices; sriracha coleslaw with chopped ginger, and a poached egg on top. "Brisket Biscuit" – pulled beef brisket, rubbed with brown sugar, chili powder, curry powder and secret spices, braised with onions and garlic, topped with goat cheese smoked using hickory chips; banana buffalo hot sauce, made with deep-fried bananas, hot sauce and brown butter, barbecue pickled onions, and a poached egg, served on top a signature biscuit.

=== Midnight Munchies ===
Restaurant	Location	Specialty(s)
Nano Brew	Cleveland, Ohio	"Spicy Burger" – (Named one of the "Best 33 Burgers in America" by Thrillist) flattop-grilled local beef patty, topped with Amish County cheddar cheese, roasted poblano peppers, caramelized onions, and mixed greens on a chipotle mayo brioche bun. "PB&J Burger" – topped with bacon jam (made from bacon, brown sugar, sautéed onions coffee, maple syrup, chili sauce, and whiskey, house-made peanut butter, and mixed greens.
The Sutler Saloon	Nashville, Tennessee	"Smoked Brisket Mac N' Cheese" – wagon wheel pasta topped with a cheese sauce (made with butter, flour, milk, salt, white pepper, cream cheese, roasted garlic cheddar, buttermilk cheddar, smoked cheddar and sharp cheddar cheese), topped with roasted poblano peppers, shredded white cheddar, and smoked cherry tomatoes, and burnt ends from their smoked beef brisket, and cheddar cheese curbs are added, baked in the oven and finished with breadcrumbs. "Hot Catfish Tacos" – two corn tortillas slathered in "comeback sauce" (spicy mayo) loaded with catfish dredged in hot sauce buttermilk, and coated in cornmeal, deep-fried and tossed in hot butter (seasoned with chili peppers, and secret spices) topped with kale slaw with peanut dressing and pineapple pico de gallo.
State Park	Cambridge, Massachusetts	"Deep-Fried Ribs" – pork ribs cured in salt and sugar, confit in pork fat, dredged in corn starch, deep-fried and smothered in gochujang sauce (Korean hot pepper paste pureed with garlic, ginger, sesame oil, rice wine vinegar, and honey), topped with toasted benne seeds, and garnished with green scallions, served with a side of kimchi. "State Park Cocktail" – American lager with a shot of amaro and rye, and a twist of lemon peel is rubbed around the bottle top and shoved inside.
Treylor Park	Savannah, Georgia	"Chicken & Pancake Tacos" – a folded ground black pepper pancake loaded with chicken tenders marinated in half-n-half, coated in seasoned flour, and deep-fried, topped with chili aioli, and strawberry jalapeño salsa (made with diced strawberries, jalapeños, salt, pepper, lime juice, and diced red onions). "Treylor Park Cocktail" – Aperol cordial, soda water, prosecco, orange juice and Fernet liqueur, garnished with a blood orange wheel and served over ice in a mason jar. "Shrimp & Grits Tacos" – corn tortillas loaded with fried local shrimp, grits (made with paprika, salt, pepper, green peppers and cheese), cut into squares and deep-fried, topped with chimichurri sauce (made from spinach, cilantro, garlic, salt, white pepper, crushed red pepper, red wine vinegar, and extra virgin olive oil), shredded lettuce, and sweet chili aioli, garnished with diced red peppers.
The Twisted Spoke	West Side, Chicago, Illinois	"Boss Hog" – pork shoulder, rubbed with salt and pepper, smoked in-house for 12 hours, pulled and smothered in barbecue sauce (made with ketchup, chili sauce, Worcestershire sauce, liquid smoke, garlic and brown sugar), topped with coleslaw (shredded cabbage in a dressing of cider vinegar, sugar, ginger, toasted mustard seeds and horseradish) on a brioche bun, and served with fries. "Breakfast of Champions" – cocktail with cream, bourbon, Irish cream, topped with Captain Crunch cereal and whipped cream. "Flaming Wings" – deep-fried chicken wings in a lemon sauce (made from butter, oregano, chili flakes, garlic, pepper, lemon zest, and lemon juice), bourbon is poured over and its set on fire in a cast-iron pan.
Cypress Street Pint & Plate	Atlanta, Georgia	"Brisket Melt" – beef brisket, marinated in a super hoppy IPA for 24 hours, rubbed with salt, pepper, granulated garlic and onion, and cayenne, house-smoked on apple cider-smoked hickory chips, thick-sliced, and topped with homemade barbecue sauce (made with ketchup, brown sugar, cayenne, smoke paprika, granulated onion and garlic, Worcestershire sauce and apple cider vinegar), mild cheddar cheese (steamed with beer on flattop grill), caramelized onions and poblano peppers, on a butter-toasted ciabatta bun, served with fries. "Winnie Palmer" – muddled lemon, simple syrup, crushed ice, house-made infused vodka sweet tea, and pomegranate juice. "BBQ Pork Egg Rolls" – smoked barbecue pork butt, slow-cooked collard greens, rolled in egg roll wrappers, coated in cornstarch, deep-fried and topped with mustard barbecue sauce and a sriracha ranch.
Milwaukee Brat House	Milwaukee, Wisconsin	"The Miltown" – bratwurst soaked in beer, onions and garlic, fire-grilled and topped with onions and mushrooms (sautéed in butter), and Wisconsin cheddar cheese, served on a fresh-baked soft pretzel bun. "The Johnny Utah" – flame-grilled Kentucky Bourbon-infused Usinger's bratwurst topped with house-made pulled pork (in your choice of style: barbecue, garlic teriyaki, or "tiger sauce"—chili Thai sauce mixed with house buffalo sauce), and coleslaw, served on a hoagie roll with a spear of dill pickle chips.
Extra Fancy	Brooklyn, New York	"Connecticut Style Lobster Roll " – lobster claw and tail meat, warmed in drawn butter infused with garlic, mixed with chipotle paprika mayo, lemon juice and chives, served on a butter-toasted split-top bun with crispy romaine and chervil. "Honey, I Spiced The Kids" – cocktail consisting of Mezcal, Blanco tequila, grapefruit juice, lime juice, jalapeño honey and habanero shrub, served in a chili-rimmed glass. "Triple Patty Melt" – three 1/4 pound dry-aged beef burgers, flat-topped grilled, topped with caramelized Vidalia onions, sharp Wisconsin cheddar, stacked on toast and squished.

=== Winner Winner Chicken Dinner ===
Restaurant	Location	Specialty(s)
Pierce's Pitt Bar-B-Que	Williamsburg, Virginia	Whole Smoked Barbecue Chicken
Jesse Ferman's Free Range (food truck)	Los Angeles, California	Honey Sriracha Chicken Biscuit
Shirley Mae's Cafe	Louisville, Kentucky	Baked chicken and dressing
Party Fowl	Nashville, Tennessee	Hot chicken and beignet
Brenda's Meat & Three	San Francisco, California	Southern style fried chicken
Fire on the Mountain	Portland, Oregon	Spicy hot wings
ChurchKey	Washington, D.C.	New Luther chicken sandwich
Lucy's Fried Chicken	Austin, Texas	Fried Chicken

=== Italian Eats ===
Restaurant	Location	Specialty(s)
Isola Pizza Bar	Little Italy, San Diego, California	"Pizza Napolitana Quatro Carne" – topped with homemade chunky tomato marinara, (made with San Marzano tomatoes, basil, sea salt and olive oil), Calabrese sausage, spicy salami, fennel sausage, guanciale (cured pork jowl), pancetta, and fresh mozzarella, baked in a wood-burning oven.
Al's #1 Italian Beef	Chicago, Illinois	Italian Beef Sandwich – top sirloin butt roasted in secret spices for 3 ½ hours, chilled and sliced paper-thin, marinated in beef roasting juices, topped with giardiniera (spicy pickled vegetable mix of celery, peppers and spices), with a choice of it dipped in beef drippings.
Zia's On The Hill	The Hill, St. Louis, Missouri	"Spiedini Prosciutto" – (meaning "skewers") chicken breast strips marinated in Zia's award-winning salad dressing, battered in spiced breadcrumbs, skewered, and grilled over an open flame, topped with picada sauce (made with water, white wine, chicken broth, lemon juice and butter), mushrooms and prosciutto ham, finished with shredded Provel cheese. "Toasted Raviolis" – local cheese raviolis, dipped in egg whites, breadcrumbs and grated Parmesan cheese, deep-fried served with a side of homemade marinara sauce (made with chopped onions sautéed in olive oil, fresh and granulated garlic, black pepper, salt, basil, sugar, water, and three types of tomatoes: chunk, sauce and paste).
Terramia Ristorante	North End, Boston, Massachusetts	"Aperto (Open-Face Ravioli)" – homemade ravioli sheets (made with double zero flour imported from Italy, durum wheat, semolina flour, salt, and egg yolks), layered with a lobster puree (made from Maine lobster claw meat, garlic, olive oil, and mascarpone cheese), zucchini, Yutan scallops and shrimp, shallots, sautéed in white wine, cherry tomato juice, cream and lobster mascarpone puree, garnished with parsley and basil oil.
Leo's Grandevous	Hoboken, New Jersey	"Stuffed Calamari" – whole calamari stuffed with a mixture of eggs, parsley, garlic, grated Parmesan and breadcrumbs, cooked in homemade tomato gravy (made from tomatoes, garlic, onions, and secret spices), excess filling is rolled up into an egg ball, served with angel hair pasta. "Mussels Fra Diavolo" – fresh mussels and shrimp, sautéed in olive oil garlic, red peppers, and white wine, served over linguini, and covered in red sauce and grated Parmesan.
Café Firenze Restaurant	Moorpark, California	"Osso Buco Milanese" – osso buco (veal shank) seasoned with salt, pepper, dredged in flour and braised in a veal stock demi-glace (made from veal bones, onions, carrots, celery, tomato paste, fresh herbs of sage and rosemary, peppercorns, bay leaves, garlic, water and chianti wine), served over pancetta-laced risotto Milanese, topped with grated Parmesan, and gremolata (made with chopped parsley, lemon and orange zest, lemon and orange juice, and garlic).
Trattoria Da Vittorio	San Francisco, California	"Cioppino" – clams, mussels, calamari, shrimp, wild salmon, branzino, Petrale sole, Dungeness crab, Main lobster are sautéed in olive oil, garlic, white wine seafood stock, and homemade tomato sauce, garnished with parsley and garlic bread for dipping in the sauce. "Eggplant Parmigiana" – Malanzana eggplants, sliced and deep-fried, layered with homemade marinara sauce (made with boiled tomatoes, sautéed onions in olive oil and fresh basil), mozzarella, parmigiana reggiano, topped with formaggio cheese, and baked in the oven.
Quartino Ristorante & Wine Bar	Chicago, Illinois	"Pappardelle al Sugo di Manzo" – homemade pappardelle paired with piedmontese shoulder of shredded beef, (braised in olive oil, onions, garlic, chianti red wine, Campania tomatoes, salt and black pepper) and topped with parmigiana reggiano. Gnocchi – blanched gnocchi (potato pasta) sautéed in Taggiasca olive oil, sliced garlic, potatoes and green beans, covered in homemade pesto, garnished with fresh arugula and sprinkled with Parmesan cheese.

=== BBQ Bliss ===
Restaurant	Location	Specialty(s)
Bessinger's Bar-B-Q	Charleston, South Carolina	"Chopped Pork Platter" – ham hocks smoked in aged hickory and oak wood for 16 hours, chopped and drizzled with signature barbecue sauce (made with mustard, ketchup, hot sauce, white vinegar, apple cider vinegar, soy sauce, Worcestershire sauce, white sugar, brown sugar, and secret spices), served with white rice smothered in ham gravy, collard greens, coleslaw, a giant onion ring, a spicy corn bread muffin and some hot peppers.
Shaw's Steakhouse	Santa Maria, California	"Tri-Tip Platter" – tri-tip (bottom of the top-sirloin) rubbed with garlic salt, grilled on an open flame with local red oak wood, drizzled with special chipotle sauce (made with orange juice, apple cider vinegar, soy sauce, chipotle puree, and sugar), served with grilled linguica (Portuguese sausage), pinquito beans (little pink beans stewed for 5 hours with beacon ends, onions, and hatched chilies), a baked potato and garlic bread.
Walker's Southern Style Bar-B-Que	New Orleans, Louisiana	"Cochon de Lait Po'boy" – pork shoulder rubbed with salt, pepper and garlic salt, smoked with hickory wood for 12 hours, pulled and drizzled with "Wordy sauce" (mustard & mayo-based secret sauce), topped with shredded cabbage & carrots mix on bread from a local French-Vietnamese bakery.
Joe's Kansas City Bar-B-Que	Kansas City, Kansas	"Kansas City-Style Spare Ribs" – St. Louis spare ribs, rubbed with secret spices, smoked with Missouri white oak, smothered in signature ketchup-based barbecue sauce, served on a brown paper-lined platter on top of two pieces of white bread, some Texas toast, and a pile of sliced dill pickles. "Z-Man" –beef brisket slow smoked for 14 hours, thin-sliced and topped with barbecue sauce, a slice of white American cheese, and onion rings on a buttered Kaiser roll, served with fries.
Peg Leg Porker	Nashville, Tennessee	"Yardbird Platter" – half chicken rubbed with garlic salt, smoked with hickory wood for 3 hours, seasoned with signature dry seasoning (paprika- and chili powder-based), drizzled with Alabama-style white barbecue sauce (made with mayo, vinegar, and secret spices), served with a choice of sides like green beans with bacon and mac & cheese. "Pulled Pork Nachos" – smoked whole hog, shredded, and placed on top fresh fried tortilla chips, topped with queso sauce, barbecue sauce, jalapeños, baked beans, mac & cheese, and coleslaw.
Burn Co. Barbeque	Tulsa, Oklahoma	"Babyback Ribs" – whole rack of babyback ribs coated in Italian dressing (made with oil, onions, garlic and vinegar), rubbed in a secret mix of sweet and spicy seasoning, grilled on high heat for 10 mins with oak and hickory charcoal, then smoked in hickory wood for 3 hours, served on a wooden plank. "The Fatty" – bacon lattice with a hot link sausage rolled in mild breakfast sausage meat and spicy ground sausage wrapped in another bacon lattice to make a 12-pound loaf, smoked for 2 hours, thickly sliced, drizzled with barbecue sauce and served on a toasted bun.
Mighty Quinn's Slow Smoked Barbeque	New York City, New York	"Brontosaurs Ribs" – 1½ pound beef ribs rubbed with kosher salt, black pepper and paprika, smoked with Jersey oak, brushed with homemade barbecue sauce and sprinkled with sea salt. "Dirty Frites" – hand-cut fries topped with burnt ends (trimmed end of a barbecue brisket), smothered in chile-lime sauce, chopped red onions and scallions.
Corkscrew BBQ	Houston, Texas	"Brisket Tacos" – beef brisket rubbed in salt, pepper and secret spices, smoked for 14 hours in red oak, roughly chopped, and served in two flour tortillas, topped with shredded cabbage, jalapeños, and pico de gallo, and drizzled with green chili ranch (made with hatch green chilies). "Whole Hog Sandwich" – smoked pork butt (shredded with vinegar-based barbecue sauce), smoked pork ribs, and pork/beef jalapeño sausage on a toasted bun.

=== Extra Cheesy ===
Restaurant	Location	Specialty(s)
Stone Cellar Brewpub	Appleton, Wisconsin	"Beer Mac and Cheese"
Nacho Mama's Mexican	Baltimore, Maryland	"Chicken Chesapeake Quesadillas" "Chorizo Con Queso"
Santorini	Detroit, Michigan	"Pastitzio" "Peynirli"
Jay's Stuffed Burgers	Plymouth, Michigan	"Stuffed Burgers"
Kashkaval Garden	Hell's Kitchen, Manhattan, New York City	"Fondue" "La Religieuse Grilled Cheese Sandwich"
Dino's Pizza	Burbank, California	"Five-Cheese Pizza" "Lasagna Pizza"
Big Cheesy	New Orleans, Louisiana	"Big Cheesy Grilled Cheese Sandwich" "Crawgator"
Sauce on the Side	St. Louis, Missouri	"Cock A Doodle Noodle Calzone" "Meat Me In St. Louis Calzone"

=== Iconic Eats ===
Restaurant	Location	Specialty(s)
DCity Smokehouse	Washington, D.C.	"The Half Smoke" – half smoke (half pork half beef smoked sausage) imported from Mangors's Market in Baltimore, Maryland, grilled with butter on a flattop, topped with shredded cheddar and jack, barbecue brisket chili (made with beef brisket smoked in oak and cherry wood, onions, spices, herbs and beans), yellow mustard and chopped red onions on a butter-toasted bun.
Taqueria La Cumbre	San Francisco, California	Birthplace of the Mission Style Burrito: "Carne Asada Burrito" – large hand-pressed flour tortilla stuffed with carne asada (lean flank steak, grilled and chopped), 4 ounces of white cheese, Spanish rice, whole beans, lime-cilantro guacamole (made with lime juice, cilantro and local avocados), hand-sliced pico de gallo, shredded lettuce, tomatoes, onions and cilantro, rolled and wrapped in foil.
Joe Boston's Italian Beef	Chicago, Illinois	"Italian Beef Sandwich" – top sirloin braised for 6 hours in beef fat, onions, salt, oregano, and water, cooled, thinly sliced, dunked back into the beef juices, served on a French Bread and topped with Italian sweet & hot peppers, giardiniera (assorted veggies soaked in oil and vinegar), and sandwich is dipped into beef gravy.
Maria's New Mexican Kitchen	Santa Fe, New Mexico	"Blue Corn Enchiladas" – chicken (stewed in onions, garlic, salt, pepper), shredded and topped with red chili puree (made with dried red hatch chile, onions, garlic, salt, black pepper, and water, blended and sautéed), green chili sauce (made with green hatch chili peppers, corn flour and water), shredded melted cheese stacked on deep-fried blue corn tortillas. "Chile Relleno" – roasted green chilies stuffed with pepper jack cheese, dipped in a white eggy tempura batter, and deep-fried, topped with Christmas chili (red & red chilies), melted cheese, and served with red rice and beans.
Revival Southern Food	Decatur, Georgia	Home of the: "Meat and Three": Meatloaf – ground beef and pork, eggs, Worcestershire sauce, half & half, Dijon mustard, cooked onions & garlic, brown beef bouillon, chopped parsley, and panko breadcrumbs, molded into a loaf on top a bed of bacon, baked in oven, glazed with brown sugar, ketchup, apple cider vinegar, paprika, salt, pepper, cayenne pepper, Dijon mustard, and Worcestershire sauce, sliced and served with three sides: Skillet Corn Bread (made with a secret dry mix and a wet mix of bacon fat and butter, buttermilk, and eggs, cooked in a hot cast iron pan with lard), Mac & Cheese (made from butter, cream, American cheese, smoked white cheddar and Parrano cheese, mustard, salt, tossed with ditali (micro pasta), baked in a ramekin and topped with potato chips), Collard Greens (smoked in hickory oak wood).
Ralph Brennan's Red Fish Grill	New Orleans, Louisiana	"Cajun Gumbo" – blue crabs, gulf shrimp, and alligator sausage in a roux of flour and water, NOLA Trinity (chopped onions, celery, and green bell peppers), okra, tomatoes, hot sauce, bay leaves, garlic, shrimp stock and crab stock, served over a bowl of white rice and garnished with scallions.
Zuppardi's Apizza	New Haven, Connecticut	New Haven Style Pizza: "White Clam Apizza" –Italian bread dough, stretched by hand (not hand-tossed), topped with chopped garlic, local littleneck clams, clam juice, oregano, red pepper flakes, parsley and extra virgin olive oil, baked in a brick oven for 12 minutes with a chard thin crust and a squeeze of lemon.
El Pub Restaurant	Little Havana, Miami, Florida	"Cuban Sandwich" – pork shoulder roasted mojo or sauce (made from sour orange and garlic) for 24 hours, thinly sliced, and sweet ham, topped with Swiss cheese, pickles, and mustard, served on a buttered Cuban bread, panini-pressed and garnished with potato sticks and more sliced dill pickles.

=== Best Mex ===
Restaurant	Location	Specialty(s)
My Ceviche Go Fish Go Fresh	Miami, Florida	"My Ceviche Ceviche" – fresh shrimp and octopus, your choice of fish: yellow-jack, mahi mahi, or red grouper topped with sea salt, cilantro, jalapeños, red onions, and tomatoes coated in ceviche sauce (made with celery, white onions, garlic, jalapeño, ginger, lime juice and orange juice), served with a sweet potato, corn on the cob and lime spiced popcorn.
Carbón Mexican Grill	Bridgeport, South Side, Chicago, Illinois	"Stelote Burrito" – hanging tender steak, marinated for 6 hours in secret house spice blend, grilled on an open carbón (charcoal) grill, sliced and put into a large flour tortilla rolled with elote (Mexican corn hash made with mayo, pico de gallo spice, Parmesan cheese, butter, corn, onion, and cilantro).
Fonda San Miguel	Austin, Texas	"Pollo and Molé Poblano" – Puebla-style dish of half a chicken boiled in chicken broth, smothering in mole (made with three different kinds of dried chili peppers: chili ancho, chili mulato, and chili pasilla, spiced with toasted cloves, cilantro seeds, anise, fresh garlic, sesame seeds, chili seeds, peppercorn and cinnamon bark, boiled tomatillos, deep-fried corn tortilla chips, almonds raisins, and pumpkin seeds, and pieces of stale bread, blended with chicken stock and simmered with Mexican chocolate), garnished with sesame seeds and served with white rice.
TacoLu Baja Mexicana	Jacksonville, Florida	"Enchilada Roja" – beef brisket seasoned with blackening spices with cumin and coriander, flash-seared on a flattop, braised in oven with white onions, jalapeños, and Mexican amber beer, shredded and topped with ranchero sauce (made with roasted tomatoes, jalapeños, garlic, onions, and cinnamon sticks), stacked on two flour tortillas, and topped with shredded melted cheese.
El Pinto	Albuquerque, New Mexico	"Red Chili Ribs" – a full rack of babyback ribs, seared on a grilled, seasoned with pepper, garlic powder and sea salt, rubbed with red chili caribe (thick puree of sun-dried hatch chilies), roasted in oven for 6 hours, served with calabacitas (made with grilled zucchini, yellow squash, roasted corn, caramelized onions, and hatch green chilies) and a side salad. "Ribeye Con Enchilada" – a 24-ounce dry-aged bone-in tomahawk cut ribeye steak, grilled on an open flame and served with a cheese enchilada topped with red chili sauce, melted cheese, chopped onions, and topped with an egg, and a side of pinto beans.
Manuel's Original El Tepeyac Café	Boyle Heights, East Los Angeles, California	"Hollenbeck Burrito" – a jumbo flour tortilla stuffed with chili verde (made with Roma tomatoes, onions, jalapeños, salt, pepper, garlic powder, water and chunks of pork butt deep-fried in lard), smashed pinto beans (boiled in water, salt and onions, coated in chili Colorado sauce and lard), Mexican yellow rice, and guacamole, served with lettuce and tomato on the side. "Manuel Special" – massive 5-pound burrito the feeds a family of four, stuffed with machaca (beef chuck roll stewed in water and salt, shredded and sautéed in lard, tomatoes, jalapeños, onions, with garlic powder pepper, salt and three eggs and coated with cheese), Mexican rice, guacamole, rolled, topped with cheese and ranchero sauce (jalapeños and ortega chiles).
Taco Guild	Phoenix, Arizona	Restaurant inside a church founded in 1893. "Coffee Braised Beef Taco" – two hand-pressed corn tortilla filled with beef chuck (rubbed with cocoa powder, cumin, salt, pepper and ancho chili), seared on an open flame grill, braised with coffee for 4 hours, shredded and topped with mango jicama relish (made with chopped mangos, jicama, red bell peppers, cilantro, salt, pepper and lime juice), caramelized onions and cotija cheese. "Peking Duck Taco" – two flour tortillas filled with Peking duck (roasted duck legs coated with a soy sauce featuring ginger, white pepper, cloves, nutmeg, and cinnamon), shredded, sautéed with pomegranate infused plum sauce, and topped with apricot poblano compote (poblanos blackened on a grill, peeled and sautéed with chopped onion and dried apricots, ginger and white wine) and a piece of brie dredged in seasoned flour and deep-fried.
Tommy's Mexican Restaurant	San Francisco, California	Yucatan-style cuisine with world class tequila: "Salbutes" – light and fluffy deep-fried hand-pressed masa tortillas stuffed with rellano negro (made with bone-in chicken braised in charred chili peppers), shredded and topped with a slice of avocado and habanero sauce, and garnished with cilantro. "Carmones Kisin" – black tiger shrimp (sautéed red onions, tomatoes, green peppers, yellow garlic, mild tomato salsa, and habanero infused tequila), served with traditional rice and black beans, garnished with fresh cilantro.

=== Surf and Turf ===
Restaurant	Location	Specialty(s)
Square Bar & Grill	Chicago, Illinois	"Kobe Surf & Turf Burger" – Kobe beef patty, grilled salt and pepper and topped with French brie cheese, prosciutto di Parma, and two slipper lobster tails grilled on the flattop with butter, drizzled with house-made roasted garlic sauce and served on a butter-toasted brioche bun. "Cajun Burger" – New Orleans inspired featuring an 80/20 Angus hand-cut 10-ounce beef patty, seasoned with salt, pepper and Cajun rub, grilled, and topped with pepperjack cheese, grilled andouille sausage and grilled shrimp (marinated in dry mustard, salt, pepper, cayenne pepper, Spanish paprika, chili-garlic paste and olive oil), drizzled with creole sauce on a brioche bun.
JV's Mexican Food	San Diego, California	"Surf N' Turf Burrito" – carne asada steak, secret seasoned and grilled on a flattop, and tiger shrimp sautéed with salsa espanola (sautéed onions, tomatoes, green peppers, spiced with salt, pepper, garlic, parsley and ground onion), Spanish yellow rice, guacamole, wrapped into two large flour tortillas, deep-fried and covered with enchilada sauce and shredded cheese.
Surf and Turf Truck	Sunset Beach, Tampa, Florida	"Lobster and Steak Roll" – warm Maine lobster (claw and knuckle meat with drawn butter) and Angus eye round beef (marinated in salt, pepper, dried garlic, red pepper, black & white onion powder, rosemary and olive oil), grilled on the flattop, topped with Parmesan cheese, sundried tomatoes, kale & cabbage mixed with lemon water, served on a drawn butter-toasted split-top roll. "BLT (Bacon, Lobster & Tomato) Roll" – Main lobster meat, smoked bacon bits, kale & cabbage mix, sun-dried tomatoes, and a drizzle of truffle oil on a split-top bun.
Dantanna's Surf & Turf	Buckhead, Atlanta, Georgia	Steak, Seafood & Sports: "Carpetbagger Steak" – 12-ounce fillet mignon (seasoned with signature four peppercorn rub of black, white, pink and green pepper, salt, rosemary and garlic), grilled and stuffed with deep-fried Broadwater oysters (dredged in buttermilk and a spice mixture of paprika, cayenne and garlic) and topped with two sauces: rich béarnaise (Hollandaise sauce of egg yolks, butter, salt, pepper, lemon juice, hot sauce and Worcestershire sauce, white wine and tarragon reduction) and acidic marchand de vin (made with caramelized shallots, cabernet, veal demiglace, and butter), served with steamed asparagus, broccoli and a choice of mashed potatoes or mashed sweet potatoes.
Ralph Brennan's Red Fish Grill	New Orleans, Louisiana	"Barbecue Shrimp and Grits" – heads-on Gulf shrimp sautéed with barbecue sauce (made from garlic, shallots, lemon juice, rosemary, hot sauce, cayenne pepper, butter, Worcestershire sauce, beer and heavy cream), sautéed andouille sausage, served over cheddar and pumpkin grits (made with Southern stone ground grits, heavy cream, local roasted cheddar pumpkin puree, and cheddar cheese), garnished with scallions.
Johnny Noodle King	Detroit, Michigan	"Surf & Turf Ramen Bowl" – Wagyu beef (seared with salt and sesame oil), sashimi diver sea scallops, onions, mushrooms, garlic, kombu (seaweed), katsoubushi (dried fermented fish flakes), scallions in "animal broth" (four different broths: pork shoulder soy sauce broth, slow-braised pork belly broth, smoky tuna broth and chicken jus broth) and soy sauce infused with bonito, served over ramen noodles, garnished with enoki mushrooms and coriander roasted carrots. "Crab & Belly Bun" – deep-fried soft shell crabs, and blowtorched pork belly topped with pork belly mayo (egg yolks, garlic, lemon juice, rendered pork fat and charred pork belly paste), lettuce and pickled Thai chili on a Japanese steam bun.
DiMillos on the Water Restaurant & Lounge	Portland Harbour, Portland, Maine	"Surf & Turf" – bacon-wrapped fillet mignon, grilled and sauced with a demiglace (made with butter and red wine) and whole steamed Maine lobster (stuffed with secret spiced stuffing with panko breadcrumbs, green peppers, sherry, smoked paprika, chicken stock and butter), with drawn butter.
Toro Tapas Bar	Boston, Massachusetts	Spanish tapas bar: "Paella Valenciana" – paella featuring marinated shrimp, clams, mussels, dry chorizo, and chicken thighs cooked in Spanish olive oil, garlic, chopped onions, sofrito (tomatoes cooked down with onions and garlic), red peppers, green onions, pimenton (Spanish smoked paprika), saffron, bomba or calasparra rice, chicken, lobster and vegetable stock, and peas, drizzled with olive oil served in the same pan its cooked in for the socarrat (rice that sticks to the pan).
