= Aesja =

American singer-songwriter

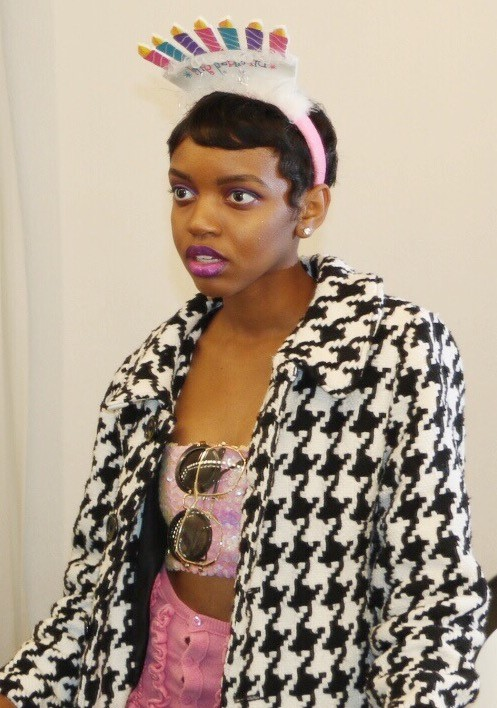
- Aesja during the filming of "Trust 'Em" in 2016

Background information
- Born: Aesja Taylor Essix; Dover, Delaware, US
- Genres: Hip-Hop, R&B, Pop
- Occupations: Singer, songwriter
- Instrument: Vocals
- Years active: 2010–present
- Website: www.aesja.net

Aesja Taylor Essix is an African-American singer-songwriter.

== Early life ==
Aesja was born in Dover, Delaware and grew up in The Woodlands, Texas. She is the younger sister of hip-hop artist Lil JSean, and when her other brother died in 2010 she was motivated her to chase her dreams in the music industry. She started recording videos of her covering songs and uploading them to YouTube.

== Career ==
Aesja took the next step in her music career when she was featured on "You’re Not Welcome", a song from Lil JSean's first mixtape. She was subsequently offered multiple requests to do features with other artists. She was featured in Billboard, Great Day Houston, and CW39's Eye Opener to hosting and performing at West Virginia University's Spring Fling.

From opening gigs for Waka Flocka, T-Mills, Nipsey Hussle and Riff Raff to hosting her own SXSW event with Torchy's Tacos in 2015 with her brother. Aesja's was a guest feature on Cyhi The Prynce’s 2016 song "Long Damn Time".

== Trust 'Em release ==
Aesja is an independent artist, and she directed, styled, cast, produced and edited the viral video "Trust Em" with Lil JSean. As of 2016, the video had over half a million YouTube views and 3 million views on Twitter.

== Balance EP ==
Aesja released her first EP, Balance, in 2014. The song "Balance" off the EP garnered 30,000 SoundCloud listens and the Ep as a whole having over 80,000.

== Discography ==
- Balance EP (2014)
- Trust ‘Em [Music Video] (2016)
- Cyhi The Prynce [Music Video] (2016)
- Sky's Falling – Single (2017)
- Act Right – Single (2022)
- Gold – EP (2022)
