= National Museum of Decorative Arts, Madrid =

Museum in Madrid, Spain

National Museum of Decorative Arts
- Museo Nacional de Artes Decorativas
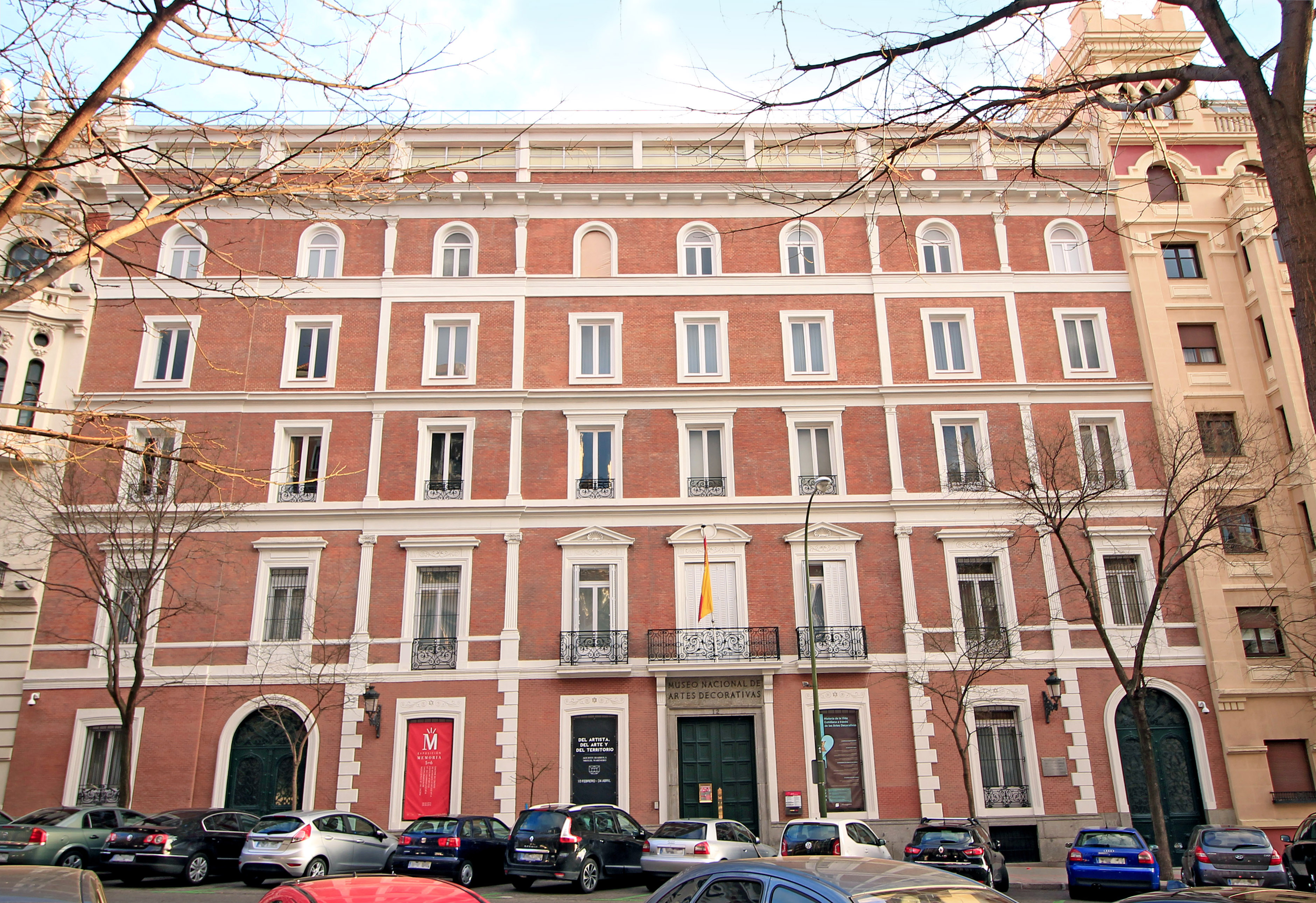
- Former name: National Museum of Industrial Arts
- Established: 1912
- Location: Madrid, Spain
- Coordinates

The National Museum of Decorative Arts (Spanish: Museo Nacional de Artes Decorativas; originally, National Museum of Industrial Arts) is a decorative arts museum in Madrid, Spain, devoted to the industrial or "minor arts", including furniture, ceramics, glass, and textiles. It is one of the National Museums of Spain and it is attached to the Ministry of Culture.

It is one of the oldest museums in the city, situated within the Golden Triangle of Art, at the south of the Alcalá Gate and the western side of the Buen Retiro Park. Following the example of the Victoria and Albert Museum in London, it illustrates the evolution of industrial or "minor arts", including furniture, ceramics, glass, and textiles. The collections emphasize the 16th and 17th centuries in particular; its collection contains approximately 70,000 pieces. Its 62 exhibition rooms are within a palace near the Jardines del Retiro de Madrid. The museum received 71,472 visitors in 2017.

== History ==
The National Museum of Decorative Arts was established by Royal Decree in 1912, under the name of National Museum of Industrial Arts. It followed a precedent during the reign of Amadeo I of Spain, when an Industrial Museum was established. In its first stage, the institution was geared towards research rather than tourism. It was a place of learning for artisans, manufacturers and designers, similar to the Victoria and Albert Museum in London and the Musée des Arts Décoratifs in Paris. Its emphasis has been the 16th and 17th centuries. The museum has collaborated with other nations, such as when, in 1933, it invited Mexico to present an artistic exhibition.

== Architecture ==
The museum was initially located in a building on Sacramento Street in El Madrid de los Austrias where it occupied six rooms. In 1932, it moved to its current site on Montalbán Street, between the Paseo del Prado and Retiro Park, in a 19th-century mansion, built by the Duchess of Santoña in the 1880s. In 1909 the building became a teacher-training school. The building was purchased by the State in 1941, which allowed some initial renovation. The building and collections were declared a Bien de Interés Cultural building in 1962. The museum has 62 rooms spread over five floors.

== Collections ==
The National Museum of Decorative Arts is one of the largest and most richly appointed in Madrid. It houses collections of great interest, both ethnographic and of artistic craftsmanship of ceramics, furniture, jewelry, textiles, and Oriental arts. Of the 40,000 objects collected, about 15,000 pieces are loaned out to other museums, including the Real Fábrica de Cristales de La Granja. The museum focuses on Spanish decorative arts, but includes examples from other countries, mostly ceramics and luxury items imported from an early date. Several of the rooms recreate scenes from the past, using original furnishings and other pieces; there are examples of 18th-century kitchens.

The furniture collection is well represented from the 14th century, a period in which the furniture was very poor and those piece which remain are rarities. The gothic to baroque collection is the best there is in a Spanish public museum, and the collections of National Heritage are mostly of the 18th century and later. Pieces include writing desks, seats, and furniture in various types. The Oriental Arts collection emphasizes the porcelains of the Ming (1368-1644) and Qing (1644-1912) dynasties. Some pieces were created in China on behalf of Spanish families and feature their arms. The Oriental collection also includes Chinese imperial robes, musical instruments, scroll paintings, and bronzes. The ceramics section houses approximately 4,000 pieces made of clay, pottery and porcelain. The oldest is an 11th-century jar from Toledo. There are examples of the works from some of Spain's main producers: Manises, Talavera de la Reina, El Puente del Arzobispo, and Cerámica de Teruel. The Spanish porcelain section includes pieces from the Porcelana de Alcora, Real Fábrica del Buen Retiro, and Royal Factory of La Moncloa. There are also pieces from almost all other notable European manufactures, such as Sèvres, Limoges, and Capodimonte, as well as marked and signed socarrat tiles.

The glass collection is vast, ranging from 4th-century BC Greece, to the Roman Empire and the Visigoths. Ceramic fragments from Seville date to the 11th-12th century, and Persian ceramics from the 14th-16th century. There are unique pieces of René Lalique and Real Fábrica de Cristales de La Granja from the period of 1727 through 1823. Textiles includes clothing (civil and religious) and household furnishings. including silk from 15th century Granada. There are pieces form the 2nd century through the present. Cloth types include damask, velvet, embroidery (including Moroccan and Arabic), lace, and these are fashioned into fans, purses, and dance cards. Carpets from Cuenca and Alcaraz of the 15th through to the 17th centuries are very rare and are examples of some of the best publicly owned pieces. The museum also has a metalware collection with a range of items from Saharan bracelets and Moroccan fibulas to Turkish inkpots (18th-19th century) and Korean cases.

== Notable people ==
- Isabel de Ceballos-Escalera (1919-1990), director, Museo Nacional de Artes Decorativas
