= Lil JSean =

American rapper

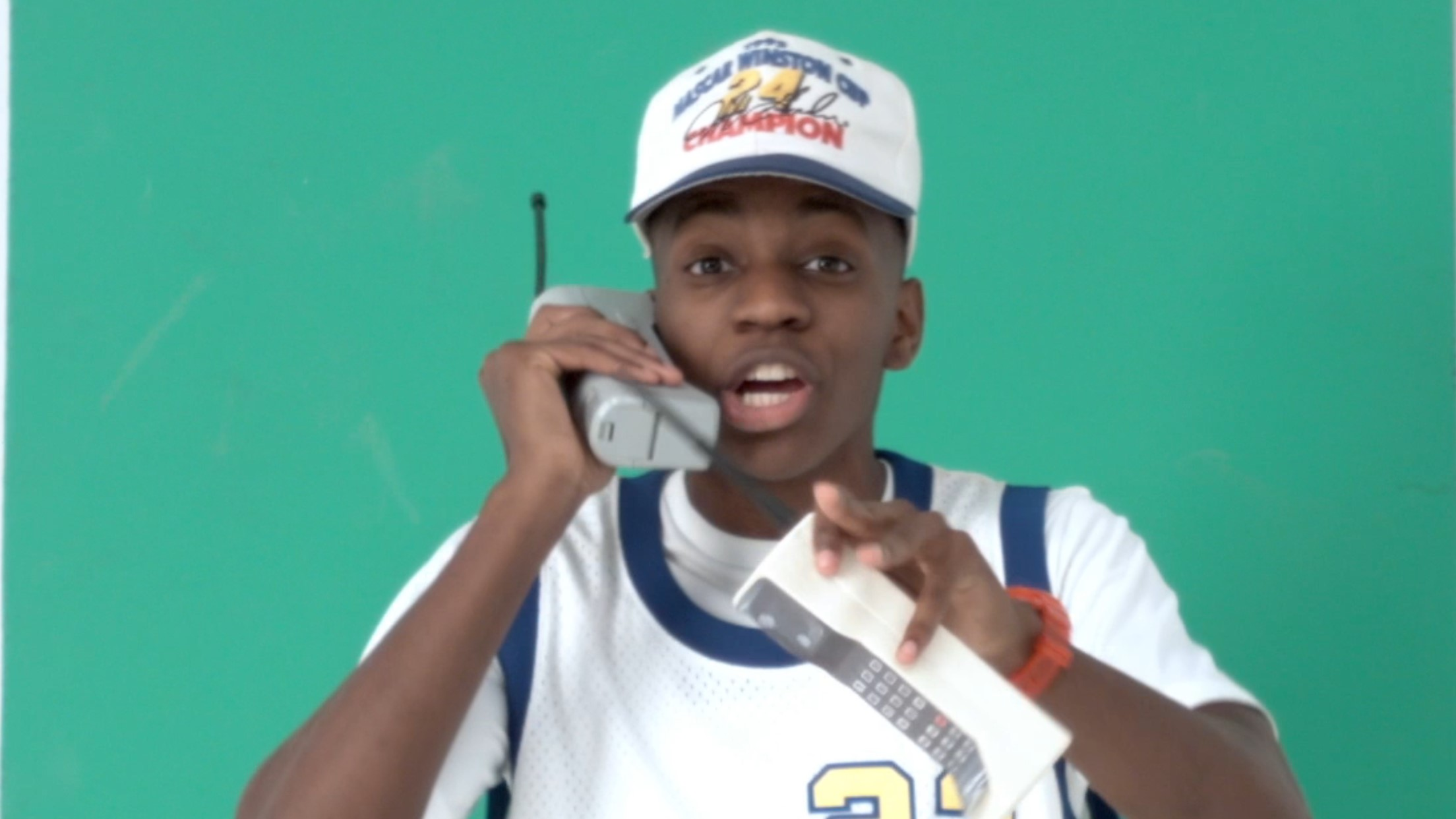
- Lil JSean in 2016

Background information
- Born: Jsean Sean Essix; Birmingham, Alabama, US
- Genres: Hip hop
- Occupations: Rapper; songwriter; record producer
- Instrument: Vocals
- Years active: 2009–present
- Labels: Fresh Visuals
- Website: liljsean.com

Jsean Sean Essix, better known as Lil Jsean, is an American rapper. He was born in Birmingham, Alabama and raised in the Woodlands, Texas.

== Early life ==
In 2010, after his older brother Dougie died, Lil JSean was inspired to develop his hip-hop talents. In 2012, to honour his high school basketball team finishing the season undefeated, he created a viral music video and song called "#CPNATION". A year later, he won a talent show at Blinn College.

== Career ==
Lil JSean released 1 mixtape in 2013, Flight, and 2 EPs in 2014, Black Friday and Yellow Tape. His song "Winner’s Circle" from Yellow Tape was the official walkout song for MMA fighter Brennan Ward. Lil JSean has seen his fair share of media, performances, and being interviewed on Great Day Houston and CW39's Eye Opener TV; being featured in the Houston Press for "Best Music in March", and also being featured in Billboard. JSean has opened for artists such as Waka Flocka Flame, Travis Mills, and Nipsey Hussle, and hosted and performed at West Virginia University's Spring Fling back in April 2016.

== Trust 'Em Release ==
His viral hit video received over a million hits on YouTube and was viewed over 3 million times on Twitter. Lil JSean and Aesja performed "Trust ‘Em" on Eye Opener TV.

== Discography ==
- Flight (2013)
- Black Friday – EP (2014)
- Yellow Tape – EP (2014)
- Trust ’Em [Music Video] (2016)
- Cyhi Track [Music Video] (2016)
- Sky's Falling – Single (2017)
