= Jeff Nace =

Jeff Nace opened Neptune Oyster in 2004 and before that, was beverage manager at Todd English’s Olives for twelve years.

He owns the restaurant with his wife Kelli.

Their daughter Ava Rose plays for Northeastern Huskies women's soccer.
