= Neptune Oyster =

Restaurant in Boston, Massachusetts, U.S.

- Interactive map of Neptune Oyster

Restaurant information
- Established: 2004
- Location: 63 Salem Street, Boston, Massachusetts, United States
- Coordinates: 42°21′48″N 71°03′22″W

Neptune Oyster is an oyster house in the North End, Boston. Their Lobster roll is considered one of Boston's iconic dishes. Kelli and Jeff Nace opened the restaurant in 2004, inspired by Parisian oyster bars and having only 37 seats.

They appeared on Food Paradise (season 10).

== Honors ==
Food & Wine named Neptune Oyster one of America's Best Oyster Bars in 2022. In 2020, they were a semifinalist for the James Beard Award for Outstanding Restaurant. In 2022, The New York Times named them one of the top 50 restaurants in the US.
