= Food Paradise season 10 =

Food Paradise
- Season 10
- No. of episodes: 13

Release
- Original network: Travel Channel
- Original release: January 22 – May 14, 2017

Season chronology
- ← Previous; Season 9 Next → Season 11

The tenth season of Food Paradise, an American food reality television series narrated by Jess Blaze Snider (formally Mason Pettit) on the Travel Channel, premiered on January 22, 2017. First-run episodes of the series aired in the United States on the Travel Channel on Mondays at 10:00 p.m. EDT. The season contained 13 episodes and concluded airing on May 14, 2017.

Food Paradise features the best places to find various cuisines at food locations across America. Each episode focuses on a certain type of restaurant, such as "Diners", "Bars", "Drive-Thrus" or "Breakfast" places that people go to find a certain food specialty.

== Episodes ==
- Note: These episodes aired from January 22 - May 14, 2017.

=== Vegas Baby! ===
Restaurant	Location	Specialty(s)
Strip House	Planet Hollywood, Las Vegas, Nevada	"Tomahawk Ribeye" – 50-ounce 40-day aged tomahawk-cut bone-in Imperial Wagyu ribeye, topped with olive oil, salt, and cracked black pepper, broiled and coated with a cold-smoked bleu cheese crust, sliced tableside and served with a whole roasted garlic clove and black truffle creamed spinach (in a truffle béchamel made with shallots, butter, flour, milk, heavy cream, Parmesan and truffle butter, garnished with shaved black truffles).
Cabana Grill	MGM Grand, Las Vegas, Nevada	"Lobster Nachos" – tortilla chips topped with chunks of lobster tail seasoned with Old Bay, salt, pepper and lemon juice, grilled in clarified butter, fundito (cheese sauce made with shredded and cubed cheddar, and pepperjack cheese, jalapeños, chipotle, adobo peppers, salt and pepper), guacamole (made with avocadoes, white onions, Roma tomatoes, salt, pepper, cilantro, and lemon juice), pickled jalapeños, and sour cream.
Burger Bar	The Shoppes at Mandalay Place, Las Vegas, Nevada	"Rossini Burger" – (a.k.a. "The $65 Burger"): Wagyu beef patty, seasoned with salt and pepper, seared in a hot pan with butter, topped with pan-fried foie gras, shaved black truffles sautéed in duck-fat, lettuce, tomatoes, drizzled with Madeira truffle sauce (made with butter, minced truffles and port wine), and garnished with fleur du sel, served on a shallot-loaded poppy seed toasted brioche bun with a side of fries. "Hubert Keller Burger" – (a.k.a. "The HK Burger"): buffalo meat patty, butter-based in a hot pan, topped with wilted spinach, caramelized onions, melted bleu cheese, butter lettuce, tomatoes, drizzled with a red wine sauce (made from shallots, honey, port wine, and crème de cassis), served on a ciabatta bun.
Jaleo	The Cosmopolitan, Las Vegas, Nevada	"Lobster Paella" – made on an orange wood-burning paella oversized open fire pit, 1 1/2-pound Maine lobsters cooked in a large pan with olive oil, sepia sofrito (a paste made from cuttlefish, tomatoes, bell peppers, pimento and garlic), samora (made from Nora chilies, pimenton, garlic and tomatoes), seafood stock, salt, saffron, and Spanish Bomba rice. "Secreto Iberico" – ("secret steak", a piece of pork from a Spanish pig that only eats acorns), cooked over olivewood coals, sliced and sprinkled with Moldon salt.
Chicago Joe's Italian Restaurant	Las Vegas, Nevada	"Nitrofino" – (Portofino mixed with drag racing) a seafood stew with your level of spiciness of red pepper flakes: white fish, jumbo Gulf shrimp, scallops, Chesapeake Bay white clams, and mussels, in marinara (made with dehydrated onions, canned tomatoes, and oregano), fish stock, served over pasta in a large bowl. "Meat Lasagna" – owners' grandma's meatball mix (made with beer, breadcrumbs, cheeses and secret spice blend), layered with lasagna pasta, ricotta cheese, tomato sauce, pecorino Romano, and slices of mozzarella.
Therapy.	Fremont Street, Las Vegas, Nevada	"Red Velvet Chicken & Waffle Sliders" – chicken breasts marinated in buttermilk, dredged in seasoned flour (paprika, onion powder, kosher salt, and granulated garlic), deep-fried, topped with chopped romaine lettuce with remoulade (made from capers, cornichons, roasted red peppers, paprika, lemon juice and cayenne peppers) red velvet waffle buns, and drizzled with Canadian maple vanilla bean syrup, skewered with a pickle. "Mac and Cheese Croquettes" – elbow macaroni and 10-year aged cheddar, shaped into cakes, deep-fried and served on top tomato bacon jam (made with Roma tomatoes, sugar, mustard seed, water, salt, cayenne pepper, and chopped bacon), and topped with sriracha aioli, garnished with chives.
Peppermill Restaurant and Fireside Lounge	Las Vegas, Nevada	"French Toast Ambrosia" – Texas French toast (made with eggs, vanilla extract, cinnamon and bourbon), browned in butter, topped with boysenberry syrup, chunks of watermelon, cantaloupe, honeydew melons, bananas, strawberries and blueberries, topped with whipped cream and powdered sugar. "Chicken and Red Pepper Pasta" – chicken breasts stuffed with cream cheese, coated in Italian breadcrumbs, sautéed, topped with red pepper sauce (made with shallots, garlic, red pepper flasks, cream, chicken stock red bell peppers, and pureed), served over penne pasta.
Bacchanal Buffet	Caesars Palace, Las Vegas, Nevada	Only Four-Star Rated Buffet and "Best Buffet" by USA Today – 500 all-you-can-eat daily offerings including: Blue Point oysters, crab legs, stone crab, carved meats and sushi. Shrimp & Grits – cheddar cheese grits in a ham-hock fortified stock, topped with Gulf shrimp in Cajun season and lemon juice, in a ragout (made with red & green bell peppers, onions, garlic, tomatoes, butter, andouille, and bacon), garnished with scallions and crostini.

=== Here's the Beef ===
Restaurant	Location	Specialty(s)
Dalessandro's Steaks & Hoagies	Roxborough, Philadelphia, Pennsylvania	"Mushroom Cheesesteak" – fresh-cut, think-sliced ribeye steak, chopped and grilled on the flattop, topped with white American cheese, sautéed mushrooms, and an on locally baked semi-soft roll.
Gallaher's Bar	New York City, New York	"Porterhouse For Two" – aged and butchered in-house steaks: porterhouse—two steaks in one (strip and filet), seasoned with salt, cooked on a charcoal grill in a brick oven, filet is cut off the bone, strip is cut into slices, and topped with clarified butter. "Tomahawk Ribeye" – lone-bone tomahawk-cut ribeye, seasoned with salt, chargrilled, served sliced with the bone on the side.
Smokin' Joe's Rib Ranch	Davis, Oklahoma	"Smoked Beef Brisket" – unseasoned beef brisket slow-smoked for 13 hours with hickory wood, sliced and served with buttered Texas toast, and your choice of sides including, fries, baked beans, mashed potatoes, fried okra and coleslaw. "Smoked Ribeye" – ribeye (seasoned with salt, pepper, garlic, onions and sugar), smoked for three hours, sliced into 20-ounce steaks and served with au jus.
FukuBurger	Las Vegas, Nevada	All-American burgers with a Japanese twist (fuku = luck): "Buta Burger" – ground beef (marinated in mirin or Japanese rice wine, sesame oil, sake, garlic powder, black pepper, soy sauce, sugar and yuzu lime), formed into balls, smashed on flattop to make patties, topped with American cheese, buta ('pig') Applewood-smoked bacon, Japanese beer barbecue sauce, homemade pickled red onions, wasabi mayo, and kizami shoga (shredded pickled ginger), on a butter-toasted brioche bun. "Tamago Burger" – beef patty topped with homemade teriyaki sauce (made with soy sauce or shoyu, chicken stock fat, sugar, sake, and rice wine vinegar), a fried egg, crunchy fried onions, wasabi mayo, and 'Japanese fairy dust' (furikake—a blend of toasted black and white sesame seeds, sugar, salt and kizami nori or shredded seaweed) on a buttered brioche bun.
Gristmill River Restaurant & Bar	Gruene, Texas	Located in an old cotton gin built in 1868. "Gristmill's Chicken-Fried Steak" – 4 1/2 -ounce, hand-tenderized certified Angus beef cutlet (double dredged in seasoned flour, coarse black pepper, seasoned salt, and secret spices, then buttermilk and back into the flour), deep-fried and topped with homemade white gravy (made with milk, butter, seasoned flour, chicken base and spices), served with mashed potatoes. "Steak Guadeloupe" – dish named after the Guadeloupe River, a 12-ounce ground chuck steak patty, sprinkled with season salt, grilled on the flattop, and topped with pickled jalapeños, chopped red onions, spicy queso, and melted shredded Monterey jack cheese, garnished with kale and lemon.
La Taqueria	Mission District, San Francisco, California	"Carne Asada Burrito" – carne asada (thin-sliced top sirloin marinated in 'sabor' or 'flavor', beer and secret spices), chargrilled and sliced into a 13-inch toasted flour tortilla stuffed with melted Monterey jack cheese, fried pinto beans, avocado, pico de gallo and green hot sauce. "Secret Menu: Carne Asada Tacos" – carne asada topped with pinto beans, avocado, sour cream and salsa, on one toasted flour tortilla and one corn tortilla.
Mr. Beef on Orleans	Chicago, Illinois	"Italian Beef Sandwich" – sirloin tip butts, oven roasted for an hour (seasoned with salt, black pepper, crushed red pepper, Greek oregano, and garlic juice, and water), slow-braised, sliced paper-thin, dunked in au jus beef gravy, served on a roll from local Turano Bakery, topped with jardinière (celery, sport peppers and spices in a salad-oil mixture), and hot and sweet peppers, choice of dipped ‘on the ends’ of the roll in gravy. "Mr. Beef's Chicago Dog" – local Vienna hot dog, boiled in water and topped with yellow mustard, sweet green relish, chopped white onions, tomato slices, sport peppers and a kosher pickle spear on a toasted poppy seed bun, sprinkled with celery salt.
Million Dollar Cowboy Saloon & Steakhouse	Jackson Hole, Wyoming	Speakeasy steakhouse located underneath the bar: "Zabuton" – 8-ounce zabuton or 'pillow' (Japanese steak that comes from wagyu cows), seasoned and seared on a chargrill, placed in a sous vide bag with crushed red chili, garlic and thyme, cooked into an immersion circulator for two hours, finished on the grill, sliced and served with roasted garlic cloves.

=== Feasting at the Fair ===
Restaurant	Location	Specialty(s)
New Mexico State Fair	Albuquerque, New Mexico	Rex’s Makin’ Bacon – "Bacon-wrapped Deep-Fried Green Chili Cheeseburger" – beef patty seasoned with salt and pepper, cooked low and slow on the flattop, topped with American cheese and sautéed green chilies, served on a bun; the whole thing is wrapped in bacon and deep-fried. "Bacon-Topped Tater Nachos" – thin-sliced potatoes (flour, egg-wash, and coated with cracker meal), deep-fried and topped with Texas-style chili con carne (made with red chilies, ground beef and pinto beans), queso cheese sauce, bacon, and roasted green chilies.; Casa Dog – "Deep-Fried Enchilada Chili Dog" –bacon-wrapped foot-long deep-fried beef hot dog, rolled in a cheese-line corn tortilla and topped with bean chili (seeded red hatch chilies soaked in water, blended with garlic salt and beef stock) and red chili sauce, garnished with melted cheese, chopped tomatoes and onions, served on a butter-toasted foot-long bun.; Native Café – "Indian Frybread Tacos" – deep-fried dough topped with red chili con carne with beans, shredded lettuce, tomatoes, cheese and chopped white onions.
Eastern States Exposition (The Big E)	Springfield, Massachusetts	New England Craft Beer Pub – "Irish Nachos" –deep-fried ‘frips’, (potatoes thinly sliced wavy-style, seasoned with house spice—dill, Cajun seasoning, oregano, thyme, basil, sugar and salt), topped with shredded corned beef (black angus short rib, brine in-house with pink curing salt, sugar, water, and house pickling spice—cinnamon, clove, star anise, sugar, garlic, mustard seed, salt and pepper), hot cheddar cheese sauce, sour cream and salsa, sprinkled with shredded cheddar.; Yankee Boy – "Yankee Boy Lobster Roll" – Maine lobster boiled and steamed, shelled for 3 1/2 ounces of claw, knuckle and tail lobster meat, sautéed in clarified butter, served on a butter-toasted New England–style hot dog roll. "Surf and Turf Mac and Cheese" – mac and cheese (shell pasta topped with sauce made with cheddar cheese, heavy cream, and black pepper), one half topped with buttered lobster meat garnished with cracker crumbs and parmesan cheese, and the other half with pulled pork (slow smoked with secret seasoning for 8–10 hours), garnished with brown sugar and barbecue sauce.; Moolicious Farm – "Moo-Nut" – an ice cream filled glazed donut: your choice of soft serve (vanilla, chocolate or twist), choice of wet topping (marshmallow, caramel, hot fudge, peanut butter, pineapple, strawberry, or black raspberry sauce), and choice of dry topping (sprinkles, chocolate or peanut butter chips, candy pieces, or cream cookie crumbles). "Blueberry Pierogi Sundae" – a marshmallow and pierogi from local Millie’s Pierogies (soaked in melted butter and coated with cinnamon-sugar) at the bottom of a waffle cone topped with soft serve, homemade blueberry sauce, and fresh whipped, sprinkled with cream, cinnamon-sugar, and wild blueberries.
Oklahoma State Fair	Oklahoma City, Oklahoma	Smokin’ Pistols – "Deep Fried Ribs" – pork ribs (wet-rubbed with yellow mustard, dry-rubbed with sugar, salt, paprika and cayenne), deep-fried and cut off the bone, served with fries.; Chef Ray’s Street Eats – "Chicken and Waffles" – chicken pieces (soaked in buttermilk and secret spices), deep-fried and placed on a waffle (made from scratch with eggs, Bulgarian buttermilk, cornstarch, baking powder, baking soda, white sugar, Madagascar bourbon vanilla, butter and flour), topped with shagbark hickory syrup.; Coco Flow – Specializing in chocolate fountains: "Bulgogi Crepe" – bulgogi – a crepe stuffed with Korean barbecue beef (ribeye marinated overnight in soy sauce, sesame oil, cracked pepper, white onions, brown sugar and secret family garlic puree), and roasted Brussels sprouts (seasoned with salt, pepper, lemon juice and oil), pickled carrots (made with shredded carrots, salt, sugar, rice wine vinegar and sesame seeds), and kimchi, drizzled with gochujang (Korean hot sauce).

=== Food with a View ===
Restaurant	Location	Specialty(s)
Salvation Taco	Midtown Manhattan, New York City	Pepillo Carnita Tacos, Chicken Tinga Tacos
Elote Cafe	Sedona, Arizona	Smoked Pork Cheeks
Nola Cookery	Bourbon Street, New Orleans, Louisiana	Redfish Lafourche, Cajun Poutine
Strand House	Manhattan Beach, California	Wild Boar Pizza, Tart Flambé
Top of the World	Stratosphere Las Vegas, Las Vegas, Nevada	Lobster Thermador
Dimitri's on the Water	Tarpon Springs, Florida	Mediterranean Seafood Pasta, Char Grilled Octopus
River Roast	Chicago, Illinois	Whole Roasted Chicken, Smoked Pork Rack
The Granary	Jackson Hole, Wyoming	Wild Boar Saltimbocca

=== Passport on a Plate ===
Restaurant	Location	Specialty(s)
Old Town beer Hall	Germantown, Wisconsin	Established 1875: "Schweinshaxe" – traditional cured bone-in pork shank (brined for 3 1/2 hours with sugar, kosher salt, curing salt, pickling spice, granulated garlic and dunkel or dark beer), roasted in oven, topped with demi-glace and served with a homemade potato dumpling garnished with chives, sauerkraut, and red cabbage. "Bavarian Onion Soup" – three kinds of onions (yellow, Bermuda and Vidalia), cooked with fandur (German sweet & sour seasoning), adobe, white pepper, and secret spice, magi (German liquid seasoning like soy sauce), dunkel beer, and veal shank stock, served in a crock pot and topped with pretzel bites, and Emmentaler melted Swiss cheese, butterkase cheese, paprika and chives.
Passage Irish Bar and Kitchen	Astoria, Queens	"Irish Stew" – lamb chunks sautéed with onions, celery, carrots, thyme, bay leaves, Irish lager, secret Irish spice, veal demi-glace, homemade lamb stock, baby red potatoes, and pearl onions, served in a bowl with buttered bread. "Irish Breakfast Flatbread" – flatbread topped with olive oil, Irish brown sauce (made from molasses, like a sweet steak sauce), chopped Irish bacon, Irish sausage, white pudding (made with oatmeal, pork and fat), black pudding (made the same but with pig blood), beans, sharp Irish cheddar cheese, and fried sunny-side-up eggs, garnished with chives.
House of Nanking	Chinatown, San Francisco, California	"Honey Apple Prawns" – market-fresh deep-fried prawns in a sauce (made from salt, pepper, lemon juice, and condensed milk) topped with deep-fried apple slices, served on a bed of baby bok choy salad (made with garlic, chili flakes, ginger, scallions, and oil, garnished with cilantro. "Noodle Tower" – three-stories of crispy fried noodles, layered with beef, chicken, shrimp, onions, peppers, in a spicy chili sauce.
Vinny's Ristorante	Somerville, Massachusetts	"Beef Braciole" – tenderized flank steak (layered with salt, black pepper, Parmesan, Swiss cheese, a slice of ham and rolled), seared and roasted in sauce with roasted for 3 hours, served on top of homemade corkscrew fusilli in a homemade marinara sauce (made with onions, scallions, carrots, garlic, chopped basil, salt, sugar, and San Marzano tomatoes). "Chicken Marsala" – chicken breasts sautéed with shitake and white mushrooms, onions, minced garlic, salt, pepper, marsala wine, marinara, chicken stock, butter, fresh basil and sundried tomatoes, served over fusilli pasta.
Masha & The Bear	Brooklyn, New York	"Chicken Tapaka" – Cornish game hen, butterflied, and marinated in garlic and oil for one day, seared in a pan with a five-pound weight, and roasted in oven, served with carrot slaw (made with shredded carrots, salt, black pepper, coriander, cumin, garlic, and vinegar, covered in hot onion-infused oil), and dill & garlic home-fries.
Mykonos	Tarpon Springs, Florida	"Saganaki" – kefalograviera or kasseri cheese (hard goat or sheep's milk cheese), cut into triangles, dipped in milk and flour, grilled on a skillet and served with a shot of brandy to flambé tableside with a squeeze of lemon. "Moussaka" – ground beef sautéed in chopped onions, garlic, pepper, bay leaves, and cinnamon sticks, layered in a pan with grilled eggplant, topped with a béchamel (made from eggs, cream, Pecorino Romano cheese), browned in oven, cut and served in a square garnished with basil.
The Original Pierre Maspero's	French Quarter, New Orleans, Louisiana	Established 1788: "Seafood Pot Pie" – sautéed shrimp in an 'imperial sauce' (made with heavy whipping cream, parsley, green onions, chives, fresh crabmeat, house season blend (oregano, basil mint, and secret spices), and white wine), served over baked puff pastry, topped with shredded parmesan cheese. "Shrimp and Crawfish Pistolettes" – fresh Gulf shrimp and local crawfish sautéed trinity (green bell peppers, white onions and celery), tomato paste, crab boil, heavy cream, cheddar cheese, and green onions, served on small deep-fried French rolls or pistolettes.
Red Viking Restaurant	Solvang, California	"Hakkebof" – two ground top-sirloin beef from local market, shaped into patties and seasoned with salt & pepper, cooked in a Danish stegepande or frying pan, topped with sautéed onions, beef gravy and a sunny-side-up fried egg, served with cucumber salad, purple cabbage slaw and homemade mashed potatoes and gravy.

=== Stuffed ===
Restaurant	Location	Specialty(s)
The Squared Circle	Chicago, Illinois	"Screamin' Demon Burger" (grilled Angus beef patty mixed with breadcrumbs & eggs, stuffed with pickled & fresh jalapeños and cheese, topped with cheddar cheese, jalapeños, pork rinds and chipotle aioli on a toasted pretzel bun); "The Fat Elvis Burger" (Angus beef patty stuffed with peanut butter, topped with more PB, bacon, deep-fried banana chunks and infused sugar & banana ricotta on a toasted brioche bun).
Verde	Baltimore, Maryland	"The Vesuvio" (stuffed pizza filled with ricotta, sopresetta salami, prosciutto cotto ham, homemade mozzarella, and topped with San Marazano tomato sauce, basil, mushrooms, olives and artichoke hearts); Zeppoli di San Zanobi (fried pizza puff stuffed with crecenza cheese, topped with prosciutto and tomato sauce).
Boone's Fish House and Oyster Room	Portland, Maine	Est. 1898: Baked Stuffed Lobster (seaweed & wood fire baked 2-pound lobster stuffed with seafood stuffing with scallops, oyster cracker crumbs, mayonnaise, herbs and lemon juice), Stuffed Haddock (two haddock filets topped with butter, lobster & scallops breadcrumb stuffing).
The Stuffed Baked Potato Factory	Houston, Texas	"Swamp Monster" (giant baked potato smashed into a bowl, topped with chicken, shrimp & crawfish etouffee, sausage, Moe's Magic Dust of Cerole seasoning and cheese); "The Beast" (baked potato bowl topped ground beef, cheese, mayo, ketchup, mustard, bacon, tomatoes, onions, and barbecue sauce).
Lolita's Mexican Food	San Diego, California	"Two-in-one-Burrito" (14-inch flour tortilla stuffed with seasoned carne asada, fried beef taquitos, cheddar, jack & cotija cheese and guacamole); "The California Burrito" (flour tortilla stuffed with carne asada, shoestring fries, cheddar, and sour cream).
Giovanni's Ristorante	Detroit, Michigan	Lasagna al Forno (17 layers of lasagna pasta stuffed with ricotta, Bechamel and bolognese sauce, provolone & mozzarella blend, parmesana reggiano, and chopped parsley).
Central Gyros	Chicago, Illinois	Gyro Sandwich (shaved spit roasted beef & lamb combo, onions, tomatoes, and creamy tzatziki sauce stuffed in a toasted pita bread); Dolmades (braised grape leaves stuffed with white rice, parsley, ground beef & seasoning mix, topped an egg and lemon sauce).
Calzone's Restaurant	North Beach, San Francisco, California	Lasagna Calzone (baked sourdough stuffed with lasagna made from a Bolognese of ground pork, beef, tomatoes, Italian sausage, mushrooms and tomato sauce, topped with garlic-infused oil) Italian potstickers (dumplings stuffed with ground pork, garlic and mushrooms, pan-fried and served on a bed of mixed greens and garlic ginger & soy dipping sauce).

=== Taste of the Town ===
Restaurant	Location	Specialty(s)
Armadillo Palace	Houston, Texas	Venison Chili, Fritos Pie
Duff's Famous Wings	Amherst, New York	Medium-heat Famous Buffalo Wings
Trejo's Cantina	Hollywood, Los Angeles, California	Carnitas with Grilled Pineapple Taco, Pulled Beef Brisket Taco
Killer Poboys	New Orleans, Louisiana	Rum and ginger-glazed pork belly po'boy, Seared Gulf Shrimp po'boy
Neptune Oyster House	North End, Boston, Boston, Massachusetts	New England Clam Chowder
Cars Sandwiches and Shakes	Ramsey, New Jersey	Fat Reptar Sandwich, Fat Cowboy Sandwich
Pappy's Smokehouse	St. Louis, Missouri	St. Louis style ribs, Pulled Pork Sandwich
The 5-8 Club	Minneapolis, Minnesota	Juicy Lucy

Trejo's Cantina is owned by Danny Trejo

=== All-American Classics ===
Restaurant	Location	Specialty(s)
Sweet Chick	Lower East Side, New York City, New York	"Hot Honey Chicken and Waffles" – chicken (brined for 24 hours in home-brewed sweet tea, water, salt, pepper, garlic powder, dried thyme, oregano, bay leaves and sage), double-dredged in all-purpose flour (seasoned with cornstarch, salt & pepper, thyme and paprika), dipped in buttermilk, and deep-fried, served on top of a cherry waffle (made with dried cherries soaked in apple cider vinegar, egg whites and batter), topped with cayenne-infused honey and dusted with powdered sugar. "The General" – fried chicken smothered in General Tso’s sauce (made with sesame oil, garlic, scallions, ginger, bourbon, orange juice, brown rice wine, soy sauce, brown sugar, and chile de arbol) on top a waffle (made with rice flour and broccoli), sprinkled with scallions.
Sid's Diner	El Reno, Oklahoma	"Onion Burger" – 80/20 chuck beef patty (cooked on a cast-iron skillet flattop seasoned with pork fat), with 2-ounces of spiral thin-cut Spanish onions smashed into the patty, seasoned with salt and pepper, topped with American cheese, and served on a tossed bun with fries and pickle chips. "Coney Island Dog" – a steamed all-beef hot dog topped with homemade beef chili and family recipe slaw (made with finely chopped cabbage sugar, yellow mustard, salt and pepper), served with tater tots and onion rings.
Southern Q BBQ & Catering	Houston, Texas	"BBQ Brisket" – beef brisket (rubbed with granulated and powdered garlic, paprika, celery salt, dry mustard and secret spices), marinated for 24 hours, slow-smoked in a wood-burning ole hickory pit, sliced and served with mashed potatoes, baked beans, pickle chips and a side of white bread. "The Big Poppa" – a giant baked potato topped with real butter, shredded cheddar cheese, a St. Louis pork ribs, chopped brisket, sliced garlic pork sausage, and bacon bits, covered in house-made barbecue sauce, garnished with scallions and sour cream.
Idle Hour (Bulldog Café)	North Hollywood, Los Angeles, California	Restaurant is inside a restored barrel-shaped building and the café is inside a dog-shape building from the 1920s: "Sloppy Joe" – ground beef and pork (seasoned with onions, jalapeno peppers, bourbon, chili powder, cumin, San Marzano tomatoes, and ketchup), topped with shredded aged white cheddar cheese, on a toasted brioche bun, and served with hand-cut fries and a pickle spear. "Sloppy Fries" – hand-cut fries topped with pulled pork (seasoned with salt, pepper, cumin and chili powder) smoked for 6-hours with local white oak, cooked with a Carolina-style mustard and vinegar-based barbecue sauce, white cheddar, served in a mini cast-iron skillet.
Sarcone's Deli	Philadelphia, Pennsylvania	Best hoagie's in the city: "The Italian" – five slices of thin-sliced provolone cheese, ham capicola, hot soppressata, prosciutto di Parma, shredded lettuce, tomatoes, red onions, topped with dried oregano and dry basil, oil and vinegar on their own freshly baked bread (Luigi Sarcone & Son Italian Bakery since 1918), a sesame seed hoagie roll. "The CC (Center City)" – mounds of thinly sliced top-round roast beef, asparagus, spinach, and fresh-roasted garlic, slices of sharp provolone, and imported olive oil and balsamic vinegar on a hoagie roll.
Pappo's Pizzeria & Brew Co.	St. Louis, Missouri	"American Cheeseburger Pizza" – hand-tossed pizza dough topped with homemade tomato sauce (made with crushed tomatoes, garlic powder, dried basil and Parmesan cheese), freshly ground mozzarella cheese, chunks of ground beef, smoked bacon, shredded cheddar cheese, and oregano-based secret spices, baked in the oven and topped with pickle chips, served with a side of yellow mustard and ketchup.
The Scout Waterhouse + Kitchen	Wabash Avenue, Chicago, Illinois	"Foot-Long Triple Cheese Grilled Cheese with Tomato Soup" – sideway-sliced loaf of bread, butter-toasted on the flattop, on one side layered with slices of cheddar and the other side, Muenster cheese and American cheese, served with tomato soup dip (made with pureed tomatoes, butter, heavy cream and fresh basil). "Short Rib Grilled Cheese" – triple cheese foot-long grilled cheese sandwich layered with shredded short rib roast meat (cooked in a sauce made with bell peppers, carrots, red onions cooked in beef stock and red wine) and sautéed onions and peppers.
Dirty Frank's Hotdog Palace	Columbus, Ohio	"The Doginator" – bacon-wrapped deep-fried hot dog (all-beef dog in a natural casing) topped with cropped beef brisket (pot roast–style) in a house-made barbecue sauce, cheddar cheese and beer-batted onion rings on a poppy seed bun, served with a side of tater tots.

=== Sausage Kings ===
Restaurant	Location	Specialty(s)
The Vanguard	Bay View, Milwaukee, Wisconsin	"The Milwaukee" – house-made cheddar bratwurst (made with high-quality beef and pork, two-year aged cheddar and secret spices), grilled on a flattop, then grilled on a chargrill, and topped with homemade cheese sauce, shredded Hook cheddar and deep-fried cheese curds, served on a toasted bun. "Thai Breaker" – bratwurst (made with beef, lemongrass, fish sauce, galangal, fenugreek), topped with shredded lettuce and carrots and fried wonton wrappers, served on a toasted bun slathered in Thai peanut sauce.
Pastoral	Fort Point, Boston, Massachusetts	"Diavolo Pizza" – a Calabrese-style pizza, Neapolitan sourdough, topped with olive oil, thyme, chopped garlic, fresh mozzarella, crumbled fennel sausage, jalapeño slices, and nduja (a spicy, spreadable Italian sausage made with pork butt, pork shoulder, pork fat, prosciutto heel, Calabrese chili paste, dolce chili paste, roasted red peppers, smoked paprika, sea salt, and white wine), and fromage blanc (French sour cream), baked on a wood-fire burning oven. "Hawaiano Pizza" – sourdough topped with fresh pineapple slices roasted with vincotto syrup (sweet and tangy red wine reduction), uncooked tomato sauce, fresh oregano, fresh buffalo mozzarella, grated Parmesan cheese, and Calabrian nduja sausage.
Mastiff Sausage Company (food truck) @ Fall Brewing Company	San Diego, California	"Al Pastor Sausage Taco" – ground sausage (made with salted pork and pork fat, cumin, clove, coriander, and fennel seeds, grinded and pineapple juice, guajillo paste and roasted garlic puree are added), grilled with bacon fat, topped with house-made charred scallion crema, shaved purple cabbed, crumbled cotija cheese, and roasted tomatillo sauce, served in corn tortillas grilled in bacon fat. "Pig Fries" – whole potatoes cut into think coins, deep-fried and topped with chili-spiced sausage, confit ham hock, and bacon crumbles, drizzled with harissa aioli (a traditional North African chili paste made with a mixture of dried guajillo chilies, carrots and onions, blended and added with eggs, vinegar, mustard, honey, olive oil, and spices), and cotija cheese, garnished with fresh cilantro.
Preux & Proper	Los Angeles, California	"It’s All Gravy Pizza" – biscuits & gravy mixed with a Chicago-style deep dish pizza: a butter-pan filled with dough, topped with andouille sausage (made with pork, garlic, kosher salt, pink salt, cayenne, white pepper, dried thyme, marjoram, non-fat dried milk powder, ice cold water), andouille gravy, shredded smoked mozzarella, baked in the oven, sliced and garnished with a soft-boiled egg cooked sous-vide, white pepper, fresh micro marjoram, and a drizzled of bourbon barrel-age jalapeno sauce. "Andouille and Sea Island Red Peas" – house-made cased andouille cold-smoked with hickory wood, served in a bowl with Sea Island red peas (grown off the coast of South Carolina), served with gorditas.
Adriana's on The Hill	The Hill, St. Louis, Missouri	"Sloppy Giuseppe" – Italian version of the Sloppy Joe: ground beef and salsiccia (Sicilian fennel and pork sausage) cooked in a pan with caramelized onions, green peppers, brown sugar and secret spices, topped with red sauce (made from olive oil, minced garlic, tomato paste, water, fresh basil, and a secret spice blend), served on a butter-toasted Italian roll lined with mozzarella and provolone cheese. "Nana's Favorite" – broiled salsicca links, dipped in marinara sauce, topped with thinly sliced roast beef, Provel cheese, served on a toasted sesame seed roll.
Links Taproom	Wicker Park, Chicago, Illinois	"Chicago Steak & Ale Link" – steak sausage (made with well-marbled sirloin beef, amber ale, bacon, secret seasonings, and minced horseradish, grinded and placed into natural casing), seared on the flattop, then char-grilled, topped with house-made beer onions, served in a toasted bun and covered with stout-flavored mustard. "Stop Dragging My Brat Around" – pork & veal bratwurst soaked in a bourbon-based stout beer for 36-hours, seared and char-grilled and topped with onion & mushroom ragout, stout mustard, crumbled bleu cheese, served on a toasted bun.
Despaña	New York City, New York	"Picante Bocadillo" – (a.k.a. 'spicy sandwich') Spanish chorizo picante (made in their factory in Queens with pimento de la vera or smoky paprika), grilled and topped with thin-slices mahon (Spanish cow cheese), pickled guindilla peppers, sliced tomatoes and garlic aioli (made with fresh garlic and olive oil), served on a panini-pressed roll.
Banger's Sausage House & Beer Garden	Rainey Street, Austin, Texas	"Fried Chicken Sausage" – chicken sausage (made with chicken thighs grinded with secret seasonings, cased inside its skin), doubled dredged in seasoned flour and buttermilk spiced with hot sauce, deep-fried and topped with country milk gravy on a bed of mashed potatoes, served with a drop biscuit with honey butter. "The Turducken" - turducken sausage (made with fresh ground turkey, duck and chicken in a house-stuffed casing), char-grilled and topped with caramelized onions and horseradish remoulade, served on a Czech kolache roll.

=== Pub Grub ===
Restaurant	Location	Specialty(s)
Reunion Surf Bar	Hell's Kitchen, New York City, New York	"Shark Bite Maui Fish Tacos" – mahi-mahi battered in tempura (made with flour, cornstarch, salt, and club soda), deep-fried and topped with jack cheese, house-made guacamole, chopped red onions, tomatoes, picante jalapeños, slaw and cilantro, served on homemade deep-fried flour tortilla (made with flour, baking soda, salt, and whole milk), drizzled with secret 'big wave sauce' (mayo-sriracha-based) with a side of lime. "The Zombie" – grenadine, two different kinds of rum, grapefruit juice, pineapple juice, and a floater of 151 rum, served in a palm tree pitcher with silly straws. "Tachos" – deep-fried tater tots topped with cheese, beef chili, guacamole, pico de gallo (tomatoes, onions, jalapeños, cilantro, lime juice), and sour cream.
Napoleon House	French Quarter, New Orleans, Louisiana	Since 1797: "Muffaletta" – Swiss cheese, provolone, locally cured honeyed ham, Genoa salami, pastrami—all toasted and topped with olive salad (made with queen olives stuffed with pimentos, jardiniere—pickled carrots, onions and chickpeas—garlic, green bell peppers, capers, marinated artichoke hearts, herbs, red wine vinegar and Sicilian extra virgin olive oil) on muffaletta (Sicilian loaf bread—big and round with sesame seeds). "Pimm's Cup" – gin blended with fresh lemonade, a splash of ginger ale, and garnished with a cucumber slice in a tall glass.
HopCat	Detroit, Michigan	"The Grand Royale Sloppy Joseph" – Sloppy Joe–style sandwich made with loosely ground beef blend of sirloin, chuck and brisket (browned with butter, garlic, onions, bell peppers in a Canadian-style sauce with ketchup, Dijon mustard, signature buffalo and barbecue sauces), topped with beer cheese sauce (made with butter, garlic, light lager—Kolsch made by New Holland Brewing Company, white pepper, chili powder, heavy whipping cream and shredded American cheese) on a toasted bun, topped with more beer cheese and pickled jalapeños, served with 'crack fries'. "Vladimir Poutine" – 'crack fries' (addicting fries seasoned with cracked black pepper) topped with spicy sausage gravy (made with locally sourced ground chorizo and milk), deep-fried potato pierogies, cheese curds, sweet caramelized onions, bacon bits, and scallions.
Finka Table & Tap	Miami, Florida	"KFC (a.k.a. Korean Fried Chicken)" – chicken pieces (margined in red pepper flakes, kimchi flakes, blackening seasoning, minced garlic, chopped ginger, heavy cream and ginger beer), dredged in cornstarch, deep-fried and dunked in Korean barbecue sauce (made with hot sesame oil, garlic, kimchi flakes, juiced ginger, gochujang—Korean red pepper paste, sweet chili, soy sauce, sugar, ketchup and yellow mustard), garnished with scallions, served with homemade sweet potato muffins. "Cuban Bibimbap Bowl" – a bowl of white rice topped with Cuban-style black beans, shredded vaca frita (boiled flank steak seared with lime juice and seasonings), fresh kimchi, sautéed veggies with bean sprouts, plantanito Maduro or fried green plantains and a fried sunny-side-up egg.
The Park	Austin, Texas	"Corn Cereal Fried Chicken Tacos" – chicken tenders (dredged in flour, egg wash and double dredged in crushed corn flakes mixed with salt, sugar, red pepper flakes and sesame seeds), deep-fried and topped with mango pico de gallo (diced tomatoes, jalapeños, mangos, red onions, salt, cilantro and lime juice), coleslaw in mango aioli on flour tortillas, served with yellow rice and beans. "Cinnamon Toast Cereal Fried Ice Cream" – a softball-sized scoop of vanilla ice cream rolled in cinnamon toast cereal, deep-fried, topped with caramel, cinnamon-sugar, and garnished with strawberries.
Escondite	Los Angeles, California	"Nacho Man Randy Sanchez" – six-ounce 80/20 ground chuck beef patty infused with chunks of Slim Jim beef jerky, chargrilled and topped with queso sauce, diced jalapeños, and nacho-flavored chips, on a toasted brioche bun, served with thick-cut fries. "Frita Punch" – blanco tequila, house-made mango syrup, and a splash of fresh-brewed ginger beer, garnished with a jalapeño slice. "The John Belu-Cheese" – beef patty stuffed with bleu cheese crumbles, double dredged in flour and deep-fried, dunked in buffalo sauce, topped with chunky bleu cheese dressing and Pringles on a brioche bun.
Jamber Wine Pub	San Francisco, California	"Mac and Cheese Pizza" – deep-fried pita bread topped with shell pasta in a cheese ale sauce (made with butter, flour, heavy whipping cream, shredded yellow cheddar, grated Parmesan, bleu cheese crumbles, and locally brewed red ale), caramelized onions, more bleu cheese crumbles, arugula and sriracha. "Mr. Meatloaf" – ground buffalo meat (mixed with red onions, barbecue sauce, whole grain mustard, Worcestershire sauce, eggs, hot sauce, garlic, and panko breadcrumbs), wrapped in thick-cut bacon, baked and sliced, served on a bed of carrots and mashed potatoes.
Kells Brew Pub	Portland, Oregon	"Irish Nachos" – deep-fried thinly sliced potatoes, topped with shredded cheddar cheese, chopped bacon, melted in oven and garnished with black olives, chopped tomatoes, diced red onions, scallions, and a scoop of sour cream; paired with a glass of "Kells Red", a home-brewed dark stout beer.

=== Stack Attack ===
Restaurant	Location	Specialty(s)
The Vortex Bar & Grill	Little Five Points, Atlanta, Georgia	"Zombie Apocalypse Burger" – ½-pound grilled sirloin patty, topped with pulled pork (chunks of pork shoulder with secret chili rub, roasted in oven), two slices of pepper jack cheese, two easy-over eggs, and barbecue sauce, on butter-toasted Texas toast, served with tatter tots. "Quadrupole Coronary Bypass" – 32 ounces of sirloin (four ¼-pound patties on flattop and two ½-pounders on the grill), 27 slices of bacon, 28 slices of American cheese, four fried eggs, grilled onions, and eight slices of Texas toast—all stacked together with mayo and 12-inch skewers, served with 20 ounces of tatter tots and fries, and 16 ounces of ‘cheese-cheesy goo’ in a large bowl.
Ernie's Market	Oak Park, Michigan, (outside Detroit)	"The Monster" – a sandwich consisting of seven meats (choice of ham, turkey, chicken salami, pepperoni, roast beef, pastrami, or corned beef) and two cheeses (choice of American, Provolone or Colby) and veggies (choice of tomatoes, lettuce, onions, bell peppers, cucumber, pickles, jalapeño, or banana peppers)—all cut fresh on the meat slicer by colorful owner Ernie Hessan—and choice of toppings (mustard, mayo, or oil & vinegar, and secret 'love spice') on an onion-dappled Kaiser roll.
The Lobos Truck @ Eagle Rock Brewery	Glassell Park, Los Angeles, California	"OG Wachos" – wacho = waffle fry that is topped with nacho toppings: waffle fries stacked 13 layers high with shredded cheddar & Monterey jack, cheese sauce (made with whole milk, mascarpone, queso, and Velveeta) buttermilk ranch dressing, 'angle sauce' (barbecue sauce mixed with hot 'diablo sauce'), bleu cheese, scallions, guacamole, caramelized onions, chopped tomatoes, and deep-fried bacon crumbles, topped with deep-fried buffalo chicken wings. "Buff Pig Mac" – homemade mac & cheese topped with signature cheese sauce, two chicken wings of your choice of sauce, bacon crumbles, scallions and ranch dressing.
Morris Tap & Grill	Randolph, New Jersey	"Chicken Bacon Ranch Waffle BLT" – waffles (made with ranch seasoning—parsley, dill, onion, mustard powder, and bacon—warm milk, melted butter, vanilla and eggs) topped with homemade ranch dressing, and stacked with grilled chicken tenders, smoked & cured thick-cut bacon, hydroponic bib lettuce and tomatoes. "Spicy Tuna Shaker Salad" – chunks of ahi tuna topped with a spicy Asian sauce (made with soy, ginger and sesame), stacked with wasabi mayo slaw, edamame beans, and fried wonton sticks, served in a square glass jar tableside, shake and pour out onto plate.
Keystone Bar & Grill	Covington, Kentucky	"Powerhouse Mac and Cheese" – mac & cheese (made with elbow macaroni in cheese sauce of flour, milk, heavy cream, secret spices, cream cheese, American cheese, Swiss cheese and sharp cheddar), topped with pulled beef brisket (braised with onions, brown sugar, and a dark stout), shredded buffalo chicken, chopped jalapeños, bleu cheese crumbles, and ‘Keystone chips’, piled high in a personal cast-iron skillet.
Café 21	Gaslamp Quarter, San Diego, California	‘Nature’s Kitchen’: "Tiramisu Pancakes" – eight stacked tiramisu-flavored pancakes (made with clarified butter, egg yolks, egg whites organic flour, cocoa powder, sugar and baking powder), topped with mascarpone sauce (made with mascarpone cheese, powdered sugar, Italian espresso and American maple syrup), and drizzled with house-made espresso maple syrup and chocolate sauce, garnished with sliced strawberries and cocoa powder. "California Greenin’ Bloody Mary" – juiced Mexican tomatillos and American green tomatoes, mixed with horseradish, crushed peppers and vodka, stacked with a garnish of organic veggies and pickled cabbage, and apples, topped with a grilled cheese sandwich (made with freshly baked organic rustic sour dough, buttered and grilled with three kinds of cheeses).
Blue Ash Chili Restaurant & Cocktails	Cincinnati, Ohio	"Six-Way Chili" – al dente spaghetti topped with a Mediterranean spiced meat sauce (made with freshly ground lean beef, diced onions, salt, garlic powder, water, tomato paste and secret spices—including cinnamon, thicken with a cracker mixture), chopped white onions, kidney beans, shredded cheddar cheese, and beer-battered deep-fried jalapeño slices. "No Feakin' Way" – chili challenge of eight pounds of the four-way chili (2 1/2 pounds of spaghetti, 2 1/2 pounds of chili, 2 pounds of cheese, and deep-fried jalapeños), served on a silver platter and eaten in 60 minutes.
Jambo's Barbeque Shack	Arlington, Texas	"Jambo Texan" – six layers of smoked meat (sliced and chopped beef brisket, pulled pork butt, St. Louis-cut pork ribs, an inch-thick slice of bologna, homemade cased pork sausage, and half a chicken—all rubbed with salt, pepper, and granulated garlic, smoked low and slow with pecan wood), all stacked on buttered Texas toast.

=== Like Mama Made ===
Restaurant	Location	Specialty(s)
Vinsetta Garage Custom Detroit Eats	Detroit, Michigan	Garage built in 1919 and turned into restaurant: "Union Mac" – penne pasta topped with béchamel (made with butter, onions, garlic, flour, heavy cream, whole milk, salt, black pepper, secret spices, and shredded parmesan), baked in a casserole dish with Pinconning cheese, extra sharp Vermont white cheddar cheese and panko breadcrumbs.
Patsy's Italian Restaurant	Midtown, New York City, New York	"Classic Spaghetti and Meatballs" – homemade meatballs (made with chopped veal, salt, pepper, chopped garlic, fresh parsley, two eggs, Parmesan cheese, breadcrumbs, fresh basil, and Italian bread soaked in milk and water), rolled into baseballs, deep-fried, and sautéed in house tomato sauce (Southern Neapolitan style with basil and chopped onions), tossed with spaghetti and sprinkled with grated Parmesan cheese. "Chicken Parmesan" – chicken breast, dredged in flour, eggs, and breadcrumbs, deep-fried and topped with tomato sauce, melted mozzarella and Parmesan.
Mama's Cantina	Belltown, Seattle, Washington	"Deep Fried Avocado Tacos" – sliced avocados (in a batter of rice flour, corn starch, tequila, and soda water), deep-fried and topped with black beans, ‘molcajete salsa’ (made by blending roasted quajillos, onions, tomatoes, tomatillos, and garlic), and ‘fugeo salsa’ (made by blending chipotles, habaneros, sour cream and honey), served on two made in-house flour tortillas, garnished with cilantro. "Salsa Verde Chicken & Black Bean Enchiladas" – grilled chicken chunks (marinated for 3–4 hours in lime juice, salt, and cilantro), rolled in flour tortillas, topped with black beans, salsa verde (made by blending boiled tomatillos, jalapeños, garlic, cilantro and avocado), and shredded cheese melted in oven.
Straits Restaurant	San Francisco, California	Singapore cuisine: "Seafood Laksa Soup" – a seafood curry soup (made by blending Fresno chili peppers, onions, lemongrass, macadamia nuts, dried shrimp and galangal, coconut milk, chicken stock, sugar, salt and a laksa leaf), cooked with clams, prawns, mussels, served in a bowl with rice noodles, topped with hard boiled eggs, cucumbers, scallions and sambal (sweet & spicy chili paste). "Mi Goreng" – a spicy street noodle dish (cooked in a wok with chili oil, scrambled eggs, fried potatoes, fried tofu, tomatoes, sugar, shrimp, sambal chili sauce, egg noodles, fish sauce, cabbage, black pepper, and raw bean sprouts), topped with cilantro, fried shallots, jalapenos and a lime.
Sky Blue Café	Edgefield, Nashville, Tennessee	"Hot Chicken Eggs Benedict" – boneless chicken cutlets (marinated in buttermilk, pickle juice and egg; battered in breadcrumbs, deep-fried, and sauced in award-winning chicken spice with lemon juice), topped with poached eggs on top of chicken spiced buttermilk waffles, covered with maple Hollandaise sauce, and pico de gallo, garnished with chicken spice and microgreens, served with home fries. "Em's Bowl" – homemade biscuits (made with flour, brown sugar, cold butter, shortening, and buttermilk), topped with home fries, scramble eggs, sausage gravy, cheese and pico de gallo.
Pacific Pie Company	Portland, Oregon	"Apple Sour Cream Streusel Pie" – four-pounds of orchard fresh apples cut and peeled by hand in pie crust, covered in sour cream custard (made with sugar, salt, vanilla, sour cream, and eggs) topped with walnut streusel topping (made with white sugar, brown sugar, walnuts, secret spices, butter and flour) and baked, served a la mode. "Australian Style Chicken Pot Pie" – chicken chunks sautéed in oil and butter, secret Aussie spice blend, celery, potatoes, onions, carrots and green peas in a creamy butter béchamel, baked in a secret homemade pie crust.
Pittypat's Porch Southern Dining	Atlanta, Georgia	"Southern Fried Chicken" – whole chicken pieces (dipped in egg wash and water, and dredged in seasoned flour with garlic, salt, pepper, onion powder, and secret spices), deep-fried for 15–20 minutes, breast, leg and thigh plated with homemade mashed potatoes (whipped with heavy cream and butter) and gravy, and veggies. "Low Country Shrimp and Grits" – grilled Gulf shrimp (sautéed with oil, salt, pepper, and blackened seasoning) topped with white wine sauce and roasted bell peppers on top yellow stone grits (sautéed with butter, heavy cream, and two kinds of cheeses).
Anna's Oven	Kansas City, Missouri	"Mom's Meatloaf" – ground beef (mixed with ground Italian sausage, tomato sauce, eggs, garlic, breadcrumbs, salt, pepper, basil, oregano and parsley), mold into a loaf, wrapped in plastic wrap and foil, baked in oven, sliced and served with mashed potatoes and gravy, and sautéed veggies.

=== Better With Bacon ===
Restaurant	Location	Specialty(s)
HQ Gastropub	Los Angeles, California	High Quality (HQ): "Plus 5 Burger" – five ways of bacon: pork belly, bacon jam, bacon cheese, bacon mustard, and bacon vinaigrette. Skirt steak short rib beef patty, grilled with salt and pepper on a flattop, topped with house-made bacon cheddar cheese (made from sodium citrate or sour salt, shredded cheddar cheese and bacon crumbles), think-slabs of pork belly (braised with bourbon, soda, liquid smoke, chili sauce and mirepoix), bacon jam (made with bacon, garlic, onions, brown sugar, maple syrup, cayenne, balsamic vinegar, and marmalade jam), served on brioche buns covered with mostrada spread (whole-grain mustard, Dijon mustard, and left-over pork bell liquid), lettuce and tomatoes covered in bacon vinaigrette. "" –
Kaiser Tiger Sausage, Bacon & Beer	West Loop, Chicago, Illinois	Sublime Cuts of Bacon: "Bomb Sandwich" – a slice of signature 5-pound bacon-wrapped bomb meatloaf (50/50 mix of ground beef and pork, eggs, cracked black pepper, Worcestershire sauce, sriracha, cumin, garlic powder and parsley, stuffed with house-cured, topped with house-made barbecue rib wet rub, house-smoked pepper bacon, drizzled with homemade "beerbecue" sauce, weaved with 14 slices of house-cured thick bacon and rubbed with brown sugar), smoked for three hours and sliced, topped with pepper jack cheese, red onion, lettuce and tomatoes on a toasted bun. "Bacon Grenades" – same meat from the meatloaf bomb, rolled into small meatballs, individually wrapped with Applewood smoked bacon, dipped in a light beer batter made with pale ale, deep-fried and served with spicy ketchup-based dipping sauce.
BarBacon	Hell's Kitchen, New York City, New York	"Kentucky Fried Bacon" – Applewood-smoked bacon slab confit in bacon fat, dredged in egg wash, flour and panko breadcrumbs, deep-fried, served with a side of deep-fried cheddar-stuffed grits arancini or Italian risotto balls (made with cream, milk, Parmesan, goat cheese, sriracha, scallions, and bacon crumbles, stuffed with cheddar), and butter & bacon fat biscuits, served with a side of white sausage gravy in a personal cast-iron skillet. "Bacon Loves Lobster Roll" – chunks of pork belly bacon lardons (or fatty cubes) seared in a skillet and fresh cooked Maine lobster chunks mixed with mayonnaise, garnished with chives on a butter-toasted brioche roll.
Sabuka Sushi Bar	Normal Heights, San Diego, California	Where Passion Meets Sushi... "I Bacon Your Pardon Roll" – seared scallops, deep-fried bacon, asparagus, and spicy crab rolled in seasoned sticky rice and nori, topped with torched tilapia and Chilean sea bass, bacon-garlic aioli (made with mayo, bacon crumbles, togarashi peppery spice blend, mirin—a sweet wine sauce, two kinds of hot sauce and minced garlic), and sweet mandarin sauce, garnished with candied garlic, tempura bits, green onions, black sesame seeds and sriracha. "When Pigs Fry" – spicy tuna, deep-fried bacon, asparagus rolled in rice and nori, dipped in tempura batter, deep-fried, sliced and placed on top sriracha, spread with torched bacon-garlic aioli, mandarin sauce, bonito flakes, green onions, black sesame seeds and tempera crunchies.
Crispy’s Bar & Grill	Kannapolis, North Carolina (near Charlotte)	"Bacon Wrapped Steak and Cheese Sandwich" – grilled top sirloin topped with shredded smoked bacon cheddar and thick-cut double-smoked pecan-wood bacon (baked in oven then flash fried), house-made horseradish sauce, fresh spinach and tomatoes, rolled into a 12-inch flour tortilla, wrapped in Applewood-smoked thin-sliced bacon and deep-fried. "Bacon Wrapped Pecan Pie a la Mode" – pecan pie filling (made with butter, eggs, rendered bacon fat, candied bacon, brown sugar, and pecans), baked inside a water bath, wrapped inside a flour tortilla, wrapped with bacon, deep-fried, topped with cinnamon sugar, a scoop of brown sugar cinnamon ice cream, drizzled with salt caramel sauce and sprinkled with candied bacon crumbles.
Sperry’s Restaurant	Belle Meade, Nashville, Tennessee	"Stake and Cake" – locally sourced filet mignon, char-grilled and wrapped in bacon, topped with whole butter, and a jumbo-lump crab cake (made with fresh jumbo-lump crab meat, mayonnaise, eggs, creole seasoning, breadcrumbs, and parsley), sautéed in clarified butter, and topped with whole grain mustard sauce, served with mixed greens.
Bacon Bar	Las Vegas, Nevada	"Bacon and Beer Battered Fish and Chips" – fresh Alaskan cod battered in two types of flour: tempura and standard, two kinds of bacon: bits and grease, and two kinds of beer: pale lager and dark ale, deep-fried, served with chipotle tartar sauce (made from mayonnaise, bacon, chipotle, relish, and top-secret seasoning), crispy fries and coleslaw. "Bacon Wrapped Chicken Wings" – chicken wings tossed in secret house seasoning, baked in oven, and covered in two strips of bacon, topped with honey teriyaki sauce (made with, honey, garlic and secret spices) served with feta ranch sauce.
Saloon on Calhoun With Bacon	Brookfield, Wisconsin	Three hours every day is a bacon buffet for free! "Pork Wings" – roasted pork loin strips (seasoned with salt, pepper and granulated garlic and onion), wrapped in think-cut bacon strips, baked in oven then flash fried, layered with Granny Smith green apple slices and served with apple-cider sauce (made with water, sugar, molasses, maple syrup, honey, corn syrup, chili flakes and a packet of instant hot apple cider) for dipping. "Pork Belly and Bacon Flatbread" – flatbread topped with homemade Alfredo sauce (cream, Parmesan cheese, egg whites and garlic), braised pork belly, homemade bacon bits (a mixture of medium-cut country-style bacon and sweet peppered bacon), caramelized onions, and diced grape tomatoes, shredded Parmesan cheese.
