= Isabel de Ceballos-Escalera =

Spanish museum director and curator

Isabel de Ceballos Escalera
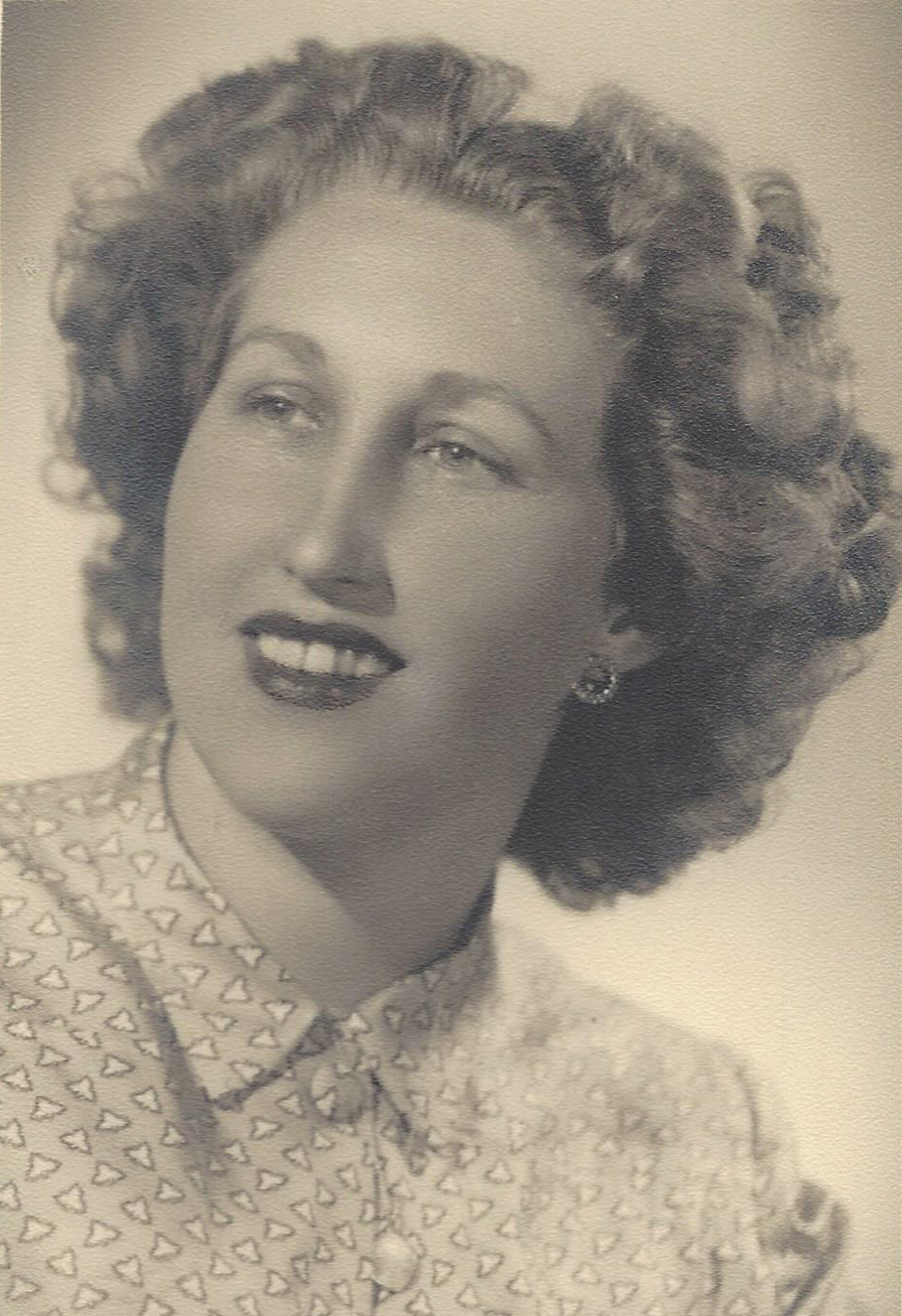
- Born: May 29, 1919; Segovia, Spain
- Died: March 29, 1990 (aged 70); Madrid, Spain
- Other name: Isabel de Ceballos Escalera y Contreras
- Education: Complutense University of Madrid
- Occupations: museum director; curator
- Employers: Museo del Prado; Museo Nacional de Artes Decorativas
- Awards: Civil Order of Alfonso X, the Wise

Isabel de Ceballos-Escalera y Contreras (Segovia, May 29, 1919 - Madrid, March 29, 1990) was a Spanish museum director and curator. She was deputy director of the Museo del Prado and director of the Museo Nacional de Artes Decorativas, and a member of the Hispanic Society of America. A laureate of the Civil Order of Alfonso X, the Wise, she is considered one of the world's great specialists in Spanish ceramics.

== Biography ==
She was born in Segovia on May 29, 1919, like her twin sister, Blanca, in the Casa de los Lozoya on Martínez Campos street, in the historic center that belonged to the parish of the Santísima Trinidad. Her father was Rafael Ceballos-Escalera y Sola, third Marquis of Miranda de Ebro and artillery colonel, and her mother, Angelina de Contreras y López de Ayala, sister of the Segovian historian Juan de Contreras y López de Ayala, Marquis of Lozoya.

During the Spanish Civil War (1936-1939) she was a military health nurse, occupying her position in several field hospitals, work that earned her the distinction of several military crosses. She was an interim official of the Cuerpo Facultativo de Archiveros, Bibliotecarios y Arqueólogos CFABA (Corps of Archivists, Librarians and Archaeologists) since 1942, being assigned to the Biblioteca Nacional de España and the National Archaeological Museum (MAN).

In 1943, she obtained a degree in Philosophy and Letters (History section) from the Universidad Central de Madrid (now, Complutense University of Madrid). A year later, in 1944, she won the opposition to the CFABA official, successively occupying the positions of curator of the Cerralbo Museum (1944), director of the Museo de Bellas Artes de Murcia (1945-1946), curator of the MAN (1946-1971), curator of the Prado Museum (1971-1974) and, finally, curator, deputy director (1975) and director (1983) of the National Museum of Decorative Arts (1974-1989), retiring that same year. Simultaneously, she served as director of the National Museum of Public Administration (1961-1989), and of the Museo Casa Natal de Cervantes (1968-1989), both located in Alcalá de Henares.

She actively participated in some archaeological campaigns. Between 1945 and 1949, in the Visigothic Necropolis of Duratón (Segovia), in El Puente del Arzobispo (Toledo) in 1952, in Talavera de la Reina (Toledo) in 1973, and also in the Roman site of Complutum (Alcalá de Henares, Madrid). She also served as assistant professor at the Faculty of Philosophy and Letters of the Complutense University (1950-1956), and was curator of several national exhibitions.

Ceballos-Escalera died in Madrid a year later, on March 29, 1990, being buried in the crypt of the family chapel of the church of San Martín de Segovia.

== Awards and honours ==
- Commander, Civil Order of Alfonso X, the Wise (1959)
- Correspondent, Hispanic Society of America
- Correspondent, Royal Academy of History and Art of San Quirce
- Member, International Academy of Ceramics

== Selected works ==
- La Cruz de Vilabertrán. Madrid. (1950)
- Segovia Monumental. Madrid. Plus Ultra (1953)
- Catálogo del legado Fernández-Durán (artes decorativas) en el Museo del Prado. Madrid (1974)
- El Marqués de Lozoya. Semblanzas y bibliografía. Madrid. Fundación Universitaria Española (1985)
- Edición de las Memorias (1893-1923) de Juan de Contreras y López de Ayala, marqués de Lozoya. Segovia. Ed. Torreón de la Marquesa (1992)
