= Torchy's Tacos =

American fast-casual taco chain

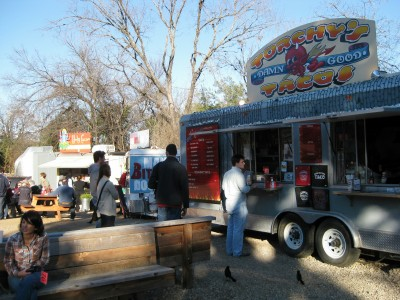
- Torchy's Tacos food truck at the South Austin Trailer Park and Eatery in 2011.
- Type: Private
- Industry: Food service
- Founded: Austin, Texas, United States 2006; 20 years ago
- Headquarters: Austin, Texas, United States
- Number of locations: over 125 locations (as of 2026)
- Area served: United States
- Key people: Mike Rypka, CEO
- Products: Tacos, nachos, soft drinks, burritos
- Website: torchystacos.com

Torchy's Tacos, also known as Torchy's, is an American fast casual taco chain based in Austin, Texas, United States. As of 2026, they have over 125 locations.

== History ==
Torchy's Tacos initially began as a food truck in Austin in 2006 by Mike Rypka, who is CEO of the company. They began to transition into brick and mortar locations starting in 2010. Beginning in other large cities in Texas such as Dallas and Houston, from there, Torchy's began expanding into other markets in Texas and in surrounding states. The company does not franchise stores and there are currently no plans to do so.

The chain's mascot is a baby devil, which came after an epiphany Rypka had. The company's slogan, "Damn Good", came from the positive feedback it received from its customers. In 2019, during South by Southwest, the company parachuted tacos to attendees of the festival.

Torchy's Tacos was featured on season 9 of the Travel Channel series Food Paradise in 2016, and again on season 11 in 2017. Delish ranked Torchy's as one of the best taco spots in America in 2019. In 2023, readers of USA Today ranked the chain as one of the best fast casual restaurants in the United States.

== Products ==
=== Menu ===
Torchy's menu offers Mexican-American inspired cuisine including tacos, burritos, nachos, chips and queso, salads, as well as Coke products and soft drinks.

The chain's tacos range from 4 chicken options (such as the "Trailer Park", a fried chicken taco with green chile sauce and pico de gallo), 4 beef options (like the "Democrat", a beef barbacoa taco with onions, cilantro and tomatillo salsa), with 2 pork (such as the "Green Chili Pork" with pork carnitas, and cotija cheese), vegetarian avocado tacos, and seafood tacos (like the "Baja Shrimp" which comes with grilled or fried shrimp, cabbage slaw, and chipotle sauce), also being available.

The chain offers breakfast items such as breakfast burritos, migas tacos, and breakfast tacos, as well as a kid's menu.

Notably, Torchy's Tacos offers a limited time menu, with the "Taco of the Month", a taco that is offered for a limited time, typically a combination of chicken or beef, with different and exotic flavors and ingredients, such as September's "Tailgater", a "Panko crusted trailer park, with chopped bacon, green chile queso, diablo wing sauce, poblano slaw, crumbled blue cheese and a drizzle of honey on a flour tortilla." On occasion, Tacos of the Month may find a permanent place on the menu if reception proves positive enough, with the "Tipsy Chick", a marinated grilled chicken taco with corn relish and bacon bourbon marmalade, becoming a permanent item following immensely popular customer feedback.

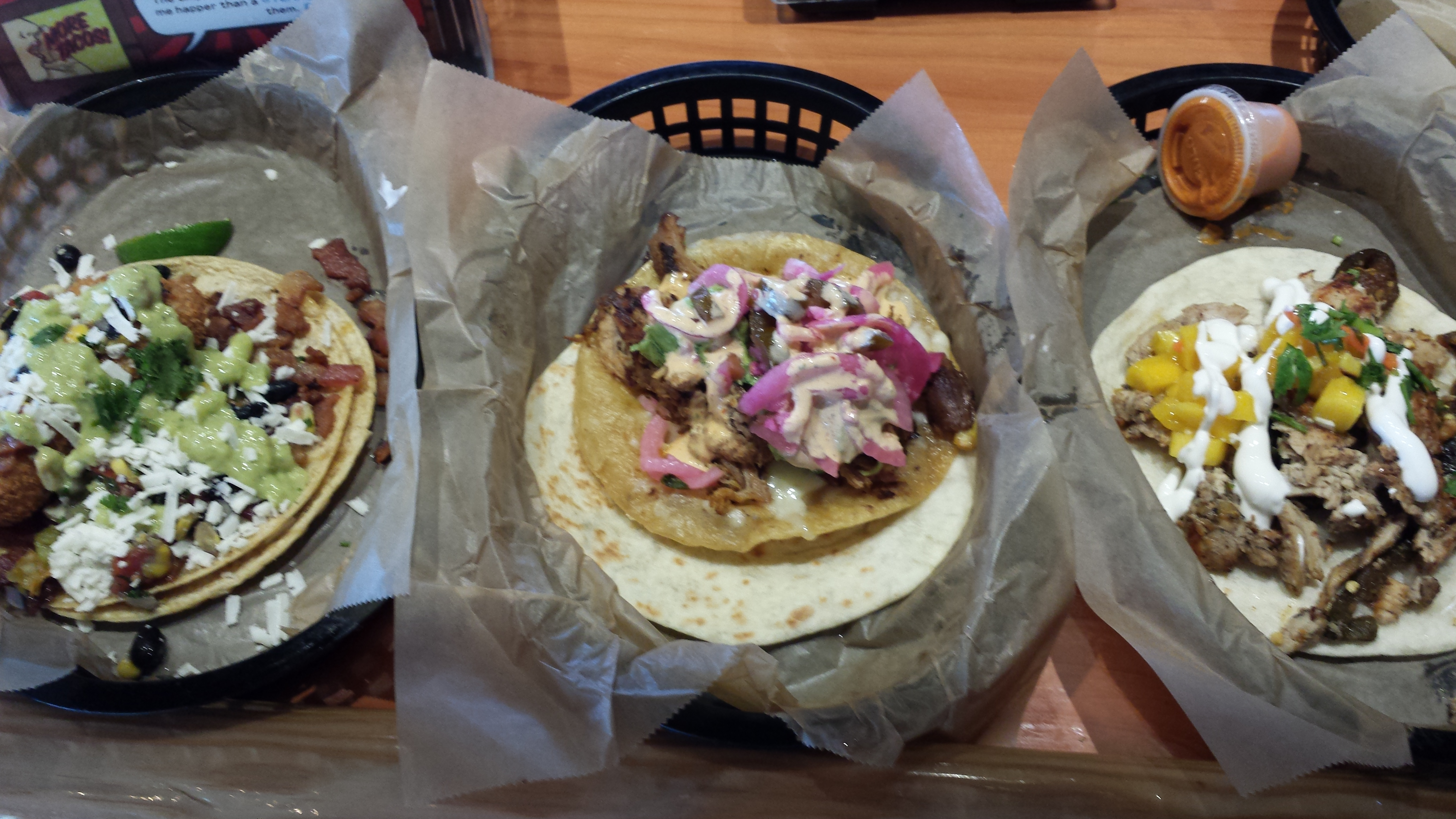
Tacos from Torchy's Tacos in 2015.
