= Sunset Beach (Treasure Island) =

Sunset Beach, Treasure Island, Florida
- Neighborhood
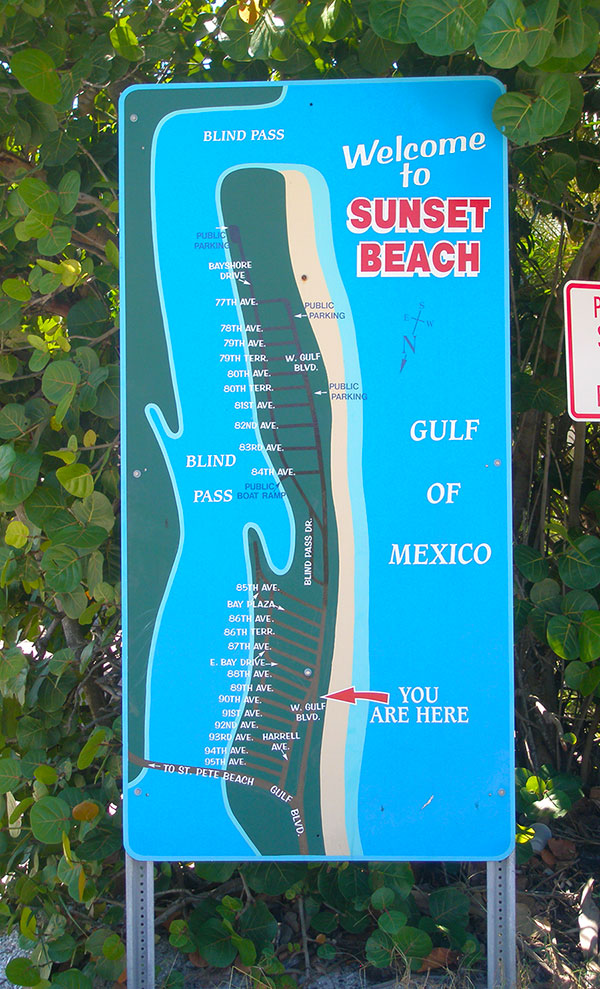

- Location in Pinellas County and the state of Florida
- Coordinates: 27°46′8″N 82°46′6″W
- Country: United States
- State: Florida
- County: Pinellas
- Elevation: 3.3 ft (1 m)
- Time zone: UTC-5 (Eastern (EST))
  - Summer (DST): UTC-4 (EDT)
- ZIP code: 33706
- Area code: 727

Sunset Beach is a residential beachfront community and beach located at the southern tip of Treasure Island, Florida in Pinellas County.

== Neighborhood ==
One of three main Treasure Island beaches, along with Sunshine and Mid-Island, it is primarily a residential beach neighborhood. Mid-century fisherman cottages mix with lush Key West-style homes, between the Gulf of Mexico and Boca Ciega Bay. From the southern end of Sunset Beach, one can look directly across Blind Pass at Upham Beach in St. Pete Beach.

There is a boardwalk around the end of the island that runs almost a mile over the dunes and serves as a place to walk, jog or view the Gulf at sunset.

== Beach ==
A pavilion facility, directly on the beach, was fully restored and opened in May 2013. The pavilion houses a vending area, restrooms, showers, and a playground. It is handicap accessible and available for event rental. There is also a shaded picnic area.

On June 18, 2013, the Pinellas County Board of Commissioners approved an agreement between Pinellas County and the U.S. Army Corps of Engineers to renourish fully Sunset Beach with the goal of replacing sand lost from Tropical Storm Debby.

Sunset Beach is one of the few beaches in the Tampa Bay region that is known for welcoming the LGBT community.
