= Socarrat =

Type of clay tile

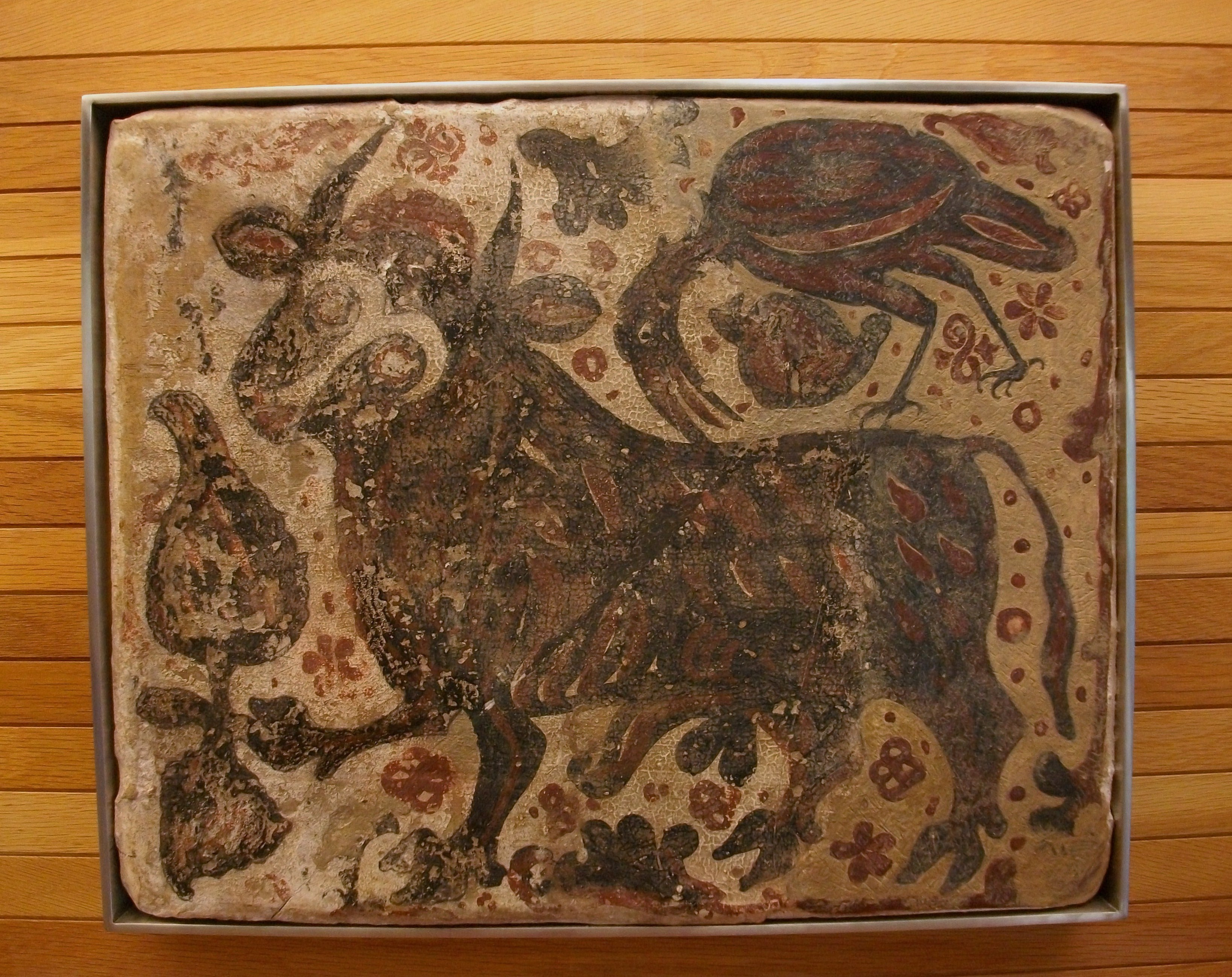
Socarrat representing an ox

Socarrat are fired clay tiles covered with a white base and generally painted in red and black. These were placed between beams and joists in buildings’ ceilings and eaves. Their origin is typically medieval but subsequent production of these objects is known, mainly in Valencia. There are other words to name objects with similar function such as rajola, maó prim, atovó or cairó. The first register about its existence was likely in 1604, when D. Feliciano de Figueroa, Bishop of Segorbe, refers to a group of roof and wall tiles written and coloured with koranic transcripts. Traditionally, they’re said to come from Paterna but the presence of these and other similar objects has been documented too in Manises and in some other places in Valencia, Aragon and Catalonia.

== Usage ==
Socarrats were mainly manufactured in two basic sizes: the smaller with 30 x 15 x 3 cm and the larger with 40 x 30 x 3 cm (approximate measures). The first one could be used in buildings in two main ways: decorating eaves (the lower edges of a roof that project over the walls) either leaning on walls or on joists. They could also be used in ornamental friezes, in balconies and staircases. The largest tiles filled the space between joists on interior ceilings, with both structural and decorative functions, supporting pavements or roofs. The smaller size could carry out the same function. Socarrats were frequently reused to build new walls and levelling out pavements.

== Manufacturing ==
There’s a wide debate in what concerns socarrat manufacturing. Being objects with ceramic base, controversy starts when one considers the stages that occur after drying the moulded ceramic paste. González Martí and Blat Monsó are the most representative authors on this subject. According to González Martí, the dry tile should be covered with a kaolin based earth and painted with iron and manganese oxides. Then, it should be fired and the result should be a matte decoration. The existence of a firing process and the nature of pigments were not always clear. Before González Martí, some authors have referred the lime used to decorate socarrats could not have been fired after application on the tile. Afterwards, Blat Monsó and others have reinforced this statement.

== Iconography ==
There are three basic types of representations in socarrats: religious, magic and social ones. The first one includes crosses and inscriptions, such as the koranic verses written on the socarrats of the Xara mosque in Valdigna. Fatima’s hands or Hamsa, boats, towers, animals and chimeric figures such as Butoni, a monster in the valencian imaginary are part of the second type of representations. The use of heraldic symbols and decorated elements made visible in public spaces and the representation of courtesan and satiric scenes fulfilled the third one. Socarrats were also used to do public announcements, such as the edict for recruit of soldiers of the Duke of Segorbe, in 1513.
