= List of American restaurateurs =

This is a list of American restaurateurs. A restaurateur is a person who opens and runs restaurants professionally. Although over time the term has come to describe any person who owns a restaurant, traditionally it refers to a highly-skilled professional who is proficient in all aspects of the restaurant business.

== A ==
- Dolores Alexander
- Ben Ali
- Roy W. Allen
- Linda G. Alvarado
- Ignacio Anaya
- David W. Anderson
- Stuart Anderson
- Hiroaki Aoki
- Andrea Apuzzo
- Ken Aretsky
- Donatella Arpaia
- Anthony Athanas

== B ==
- E. S. Babcock
- Damon Baehrel
- Jean-Claude Baker
- Kim Bartmann
- Paul Bartolotta
- Joe Bastianich
- Lidia Bastianich
- Mario Batali
- Joe Baum
- Bob Baumhower
- Rick Bayless
- Victor Bergeron
- Maurice Bessinger
- Sherman Billingsley
- Bill Binder
- Jamie Bissonnette
- Richard Blais
- Thomas Boggs
- Justin Bogle
- Ettore Boiardi
- Ghulam Bombaywala
- David Bouley
- Danny Bowien
- Henry L. Bowles
- Gary Brackett
- Ella Brennan
- Owen Brennan
- Ralph Brennan
- Richard Brennan (restaurateur)
- Terrance Brennan
- Coby G. Brooks
- Robert H. Brooks
- Warren Bruno
- Artur Bryant
- Peter Buck
- Aaron Buerge
- Sandra Bullock
- Jim Bunch
- David Burke
- Ernie Byfield

== C ==
- Alex Cable
- Karyn Calabrese
- Don Callender
- Ransom M. Callicott
- Adrianne Calvo
- Nellie Cashman
- S. Truett Cathy
- David Chang
- Sam Chang
- Leah Chase
- Chris Chelios
- Cecilia Chiang
- Leeann Chin
- Bob Chinn
- Jeffrey Chodorow
- Maneet Chauhan
- Michael Chow
- Ruby Chow
- Sam Choy
- Jim Churchill
- Dick Clark
- Patrick Clark
- Clifford Clinton
- Tyson Cole
- Tom Colicchio
- Sean Combs
- Scott Conant
- Al Copeland
- Michael Cordúa
- Dave Corriveau
- Percy Creuzot
- Ingrid Croce

== D ==
- Michael DeBatt
- Bobby Deen
- Paula Deen
- Tom Dempsey
- Grant DePorter
- Richard Dermer
- Traci Des Jardins
- Mark DeSaulnier
- Marcel Desaulniers
- Steve DiFillippo
- James Disbrow
- Rocco DiSpirito
- Tom Douglas
- Josh Duhamel
- Henry R. Durand

== E ==
- E-40
- Clint Eastwood
- Robert Egan
- Graham Elliot
- Steve Ells
- Todd English
- Friedman Paul Erhardt
- Bob Evans

== F ==
- Tiffani Faison
- Robert Fennell
- Guy Fieri
- Stink Fisher
- Adam Fleischman
- Paul Fleming
- John Folse
- Benson Fong
- Lee Tung Foo
- Shelly Frank

== G ==
- Jean Galatoire
- Helen Gallagher
- Joe Gannon
- Charlie Geren
- Izzy Gomez
- Glenn Goodart
- Frank Gordy
- Harold Greiner
- Carol Grimaldi
- Nelson G. Gross
- William J. Guste

== H ==
- Mel Haber
- Alan Hale, Jr.
- William P. Halliday
- Gordon Hamersley
- Nathan Handwerker
- Pete Harman
- Tim Harman
- Dave Heaton
- Irwin Held
- John Hickenlooper
- Henry Hill
- Charles T. Hinde
- Ted Hinton
- Tanya Holland
- Adina Howard
- Eddie Huang
- Howard Hughes
- Andy Husbands
- Chrissie Hynde

== J ==
- Andrew Jarvis
- Doron Jensen
- Howard Deering Johnson
- Jean Joho
- Peter Jubeck
- Jean Baptiste Gilbert Payplat dis Julien

== K ==
- Johnny Kan
- Burt Katz
- Elaine Kaufman
- Anne Kearney
- Jim Keet
- Thomas Keller
- Matthew Kenney
- David Kim
- Tony Knowles
- James Koskiniemi
- Ray Kroc
- Pat Kuleto
- Ashton Kutcher
- Nancy Kwan

== L ==
- Emeril Lagasse
- Nicholas Lambrinides
- George Lang
- Ninfa Laurenzo
- Calvin B. T. Lee
- August Heinrich Lehmann
- Warner LeRoy
- Harry Lewis
- Paul Liebrandt
- Bruce Littlefield
- Anita Lo
- Antonia Lofaso
- Eva Longoria
- José Manuel Lozano
- Paul Luna
- Barbara Lynch

== M ==
- Lester Maddox
- Peyton Manning
- George Mardikian
- Herman Marth
- Mariano Martinez
- George Mavrothalassitis
- Tony Maws
- Michael McCarty
- William McCormick
- Billy McGlory
- Robert "Say" McIntosh
- Brian McMenamin
- Thomas McNaughton
- Sean Meenan
- Rich Melman
- Sarma Melngailis
- Julie Menin
- Danny Meyer
- Mary Sue Milliken
- Michael Mina
- Harriet Converse Moody
- Arnie Morton
- Michael Morton
- John Mosca
- John A. Mulheren
- Marc Murphy
- Terrence Murphy
- Kimbal Musk
- Anthony Myint

== N ==
- Gavin Newsom
- Julian Niccolini
- Drew Nieporent
- Greg Norton
- John Nygren

== O ==
- Louis P. Ober
- Patrick O'Connell
- Patrick O'Neal
- Suze Orman

== P ==
- Chris Paciello
- Alex Paez
- Frank Palumbo
- Nicola Paone
- Daniel Patterson
- Cindy Pawlcyn
- Bob Payton
- Mark Peel (chef)
- Frank Pellegrino
- Claude Philippe
- Harold Pierce
- Odessa Piper
- Stacey Poon-Kinney
- Michael Psilakis
- Wolfgang Puck

== R ==
- Jay Ramras
- Bill Rancic
- Giuliana Rancic
- O.L. Rapson
- Kent Rathbun
- Rachael Ray
- Mason Reese
- Tony Rezko
- Pascal Rigo
- Jilly Rizzo
- David Robinson
- Nate Robinson
- Phil Romano
- Michael Romanoff
- Romany Marie
- Alan Rosen
- Steve Rubell

== S ==
- Jeffrey Saad
- Henry Salgado
- Marcus Samuelsson
- Aaron Sanchez
- Colonel Sanders
- Chris Santos
- Bobby Schilling
- Chris Schlesinger
- Alex Schoenbaum
- John Schnatter
- Kurt W. Schuller
- Arnold Schwarzenegger
- Patrick Schwarzenegger
- Daniel R. Scoggin
- Larry Sconyers
- James Scurlock
- Adam Senn
- Clyde Serda
- Ike Sewell
- Andy Shallal
- Louis Sherry
- Lydia Shire
- Toots Shor
- Nancy Silverton
- Richard Simmons
- Alvin Simon
- Kerry Simon
- B. Smith
- Martin V. Smith
- Arthur K. Snyder
- Thomas N. Soffron
- Stephen Starr
- Felix Stehling
- Frank Stephenson
- Lynn D. Stewart
- Michael Stipe
- Robert A. Straniere
- Christopher B. "Stubb" Stubblefield
- Phil Suarez
- Michael Symon

== T ==
- Jon Taffer
- Dan Tana
- Joe Theismann
- Dave Thomas
- Frederick Bruce Thomas
- Joe Thum
- Felix Tijerina
- Jet Tila
- Justin Timberlake
- Sue Torres
- Charlie Trotter
- Donald Trump
- Ming Tsai
- Tom Tunney

== U ==
- Stephen A. Unger

== V ==
- Donald Valle
- Richard Valle
- John Vartan
- Primo Villanueva
- Michael Voltaggio

== W ==
- Michael Walrath
- Alice Waters
- Cornell Webster
- Charles Weeghman
- Barton G. Weiss
- Kanye West
- Cathy Whims
- Jasper White
- Michael Whiteman
- Art Whizin
- Bob Wian
- Robert Wiedmaier
- Jody Williams
- Brooke Williamson
- Alan Wilzig
- Barry Wine
- Brad Womack
- Donald Wong
- Sylvia Woods
- Shannon Wynne

== Y ==
- Bon Yagi
- Mario Yagobi
- Lovie Yancey
- Steven Yeun
- Sang Yoon

== Z ==
- Geoffrey Zakarian
- Duke Zeibert
- Fares Zeideia
- Frederick Hinde Zimmerman
- Steve Zolotow

== See also ==
- List of Michelin 3-star restaurants in the United States
- Lists of Americans
