= Jody Adams (chef) =

American chef and restaurateur

- Born: 1956 or 1957 (age 68–69)
- Education: Brown University
- Spouse: Ken Rivard
- Parent: Thomas R. Adams
- Relatives: Richard Newbold Adams (uncle); Randolph Greenfield Adams (grandfather); Green Adams (great-great-grandfather)
- Culinary career
- Current restaurants: TRADE; Saloniki; Porto
- Previous restaurant: Rialto
- Award won: James Beard Award

Jody Adams (born c. 1956/1957) is an American chef and restaurateur. Adams owns and operates TRADE and Porto in Massachusetts. She was owner and executive chef of Rialto in Cambridge, Massachusetts, for over 20 years. In 1997, she won the James Beard Award for Best Chef in America Northeast.

== Early life and education ==
Jody Adams was raised in New England. Adams grew up eating New England cuisine, prepared by her mother.

Adams attended Brown University, majoring in anthropology. While attending Brown, Adams worked at a cooking school owned by Nancy Verde Barr in Providence, Rhode Island. Adams enjoyed working in the kitchen at the cooking school more than attending college. Around 1980, Julia Child visited Providence, for a Planned Parenthood fundraiser. Verde Barr was the executive chef at the fundraiser. Adams volunteered to assist at the fundraiser. After the fundraiser, Adams met Child and Sara Moulton. Moulton and Child encouraged Adams to pursue a career in the culinary industry and told her she should work for Lydia Shire in Boston.

After graduating from Brown, Adams traveled through Europe for five months.

== Career ==
Adams proceeded to pursue a culinary career in response to her encouragement from Moulton and Child. In the early 1980's, she was working for Lydia Shire at Shire's seminal Seasons Restaurant in Boston. In 1983, she opened Gordon Hamersley's namesake bistro as its sous chef.

She left Hamersley's in 1990 to serve as executive chef at Michaela's in East Cambridge, Massachusetts. Adams created menus focused on regional Italian and New England cuisine. For work at Michaela's, Adams was named one of the top ten chefs in the United States by Food & Wine in 1993.

In September 1994, Adams and partner Michela Larson opened Rialto at the Charles Hotel in Harvard Square. The restaurant earned four stars from The Boston Globe within four months of opening. During her tenure at Rialto, Adams was nominated for the James Beard Award for Best Chef in America (Northeast), five times. She won the award in 1997.

In 2002, Adams' book In the Hands of a Chef: Cooking with Jody Adams of Rialto Restaurant was published.

Adams bought out her partners at Rialto in 2007, becoming sole owner. The restaurant was named one of the best in the country by Esquire in 2007.

In 2011, Adams opened her second restaurant, TRADE, in the Waterfront area of Boston. She would open two more restaurants five years later, in 2016: Saloniki, a Greek fast-casual restaurant, and Porto, a Mediterranean restaurant, in the Back Bay neighborhood of Boston in July 2016. Saloniki and Porto were opened in partnership with Eric Papachristos, with Jon Mendez also co-owning Saloniki.

In April 2016, it was announced that Adams would leave Rialto. The restaurant closed in June 2016.

In October 2019, Adams opened Greek Street at Time Out Market Boston with Papachristos and Mendez.

In September 2022, two new Saloniki branches opened, one on Newbury Street and another in Beacon Hill.

=== Television and culinary writing ===
Adams was a contestant on the second season of Top Chef Masters. She writes a blog with Ken Rivard. Called The Garum Factory, it provides recipes for the home cook and is illustrated with Rivard's photographs.

Adam’s also appeared as one of the chefs in season 1 episode 15 of ‘‘Fetch! With Ruff Ruffman’’

=== Views of the restaurant industry ===
Adams cites her biggest challenges with owning a restaurant as the high costs and profit margins, in addition to hiring talented and skilled employees. On hiring, Adams says "It’s most important to hire people who believe in the mission of the business. Skills can be taught on a foundation of passion and commitment. It rarely works the other way around."

She acknowledges that toxic masculinity is common in the culinary industry. She has been sexually harassed in professional kitchens. Adams also believes that male chefs get more attention than female chefs, including in the media.

== Publications ==
- Adams, Jody and Kevin Rivard. In the Hands of A Chef: Cooking with Jody Adams of Rialto Restaurant. New York: William Morrow Cookbooks (2002). ISBN 068816837X, 9780688168377

== Personal life ==
Adams is married to Ken Rivard. They have two adult children. Philanthropically, Adams supports the Greater Boston Food Bank, Partners in Health, and Share Our Strength. She is also a founding member of the Massachusetts Restaurants United.

One of her favorite ingredients to cook with is scallops, which she describes as "quintessential New England fare."
