= Harvest (Harvard Square) =

- Interactive map of Harvest

Restaurant information
- Owner: Chris Hummel
- Previous owners: Benjamin and Jane Thompson
- Head chef: Nick Deutmeyer
- Pastry chef: Tab Volpe
- Location: 44 Brattle Street, Cambridge, Middlesex, Massachusetts, 02138, USA
- Coordinates: 42.37373°N 71.12187°W
- Website: www.harvestcambridge.com

Harvest is a Harvard Square restaurant originally owned in 1975 by Benjamin Thompson (he designed it as well) and his wife Jane. They closed in 1997 because of “growing competition and poor management” but reopened under new management (past managers R. Patrick Bowe and Jayne Bowe) and renovations by Elkus Manfredi. The current owner is Himmel Hospitality Group.

Harvest offers “upscale, contemporary, seasonal New England cuisine.”

The restaurant was known for its Marimekko prints in the front room and the neon Harvest sign and attracted customers such as Julia Child (it was rumored to be “her favorite place to dine”). They hosted Child's 90th birthday party in 2002.

Alumni of their kitchen include Lydia Shire, Barbara Lynch (restaurateur), Bob Kinkead, Sara Moulton, Jasper White (chef), Chris Schlesinger and Frank McClelland.
