= Hamersley's Bistro =

Defunct restaurant in Boston, Massachusetts, U.S.

- Interactive map of Hamersley's Bistro

Restaurant information
- Established: 1987
- Closed: 2014
- Previous owner: Gordon Hamersley
- Location: South End, Boston, Boston, Massachusetts
- Coordinates: 42°20′39″N 71°04′19″W

Hamersley's Bistro was a South End, Boston French restaurant owned by Gordon Hamersley that closed in October 2014 after 27 years. They were known for their roast chicken in a shallot-mustard-herb marinade. But the duck confit was called the best in Boston by Lydia Shire, Ken Oringer, and Christopher Kimball.

The original location opened in 1987 in a storefront. They moved to a larger space a few blocks down Tremont Street in 1993.

Alumni of the kitchen include Tanya Holland, Gabriel Frasca and )Jody Adams was sous chef when the bistro opened. Customers have included Hillary Clinton, Mayor Thomas Menino and Deval Patrick.

Honors include Best Restaurant in the General Excellence category, 1995, by Boston Magazine. The Bistro was a semifinalist for the James Beard Foundation Award Nest Restaurant in the Country.

== See also ==
- List of French restaurants
