= Sally Ling =

Sally Ling, along with her husband Edward Nan Liu, opened Sally Ling's restaurant in Boston in 1984.

The restaurant was at 256 Commercial Street in the Boston waterfront district from 1984 to 2003 (another location opened in Newton Center) and focused on white table clothed banquet fare. The original restaurant was "high-end and elegant". Regular diners included Martin Yan, Jasper White, Julia Child, and Yo-Yo Ma. The restaurant relocated to Cambridge and New Jersey before closing. Since the restaurant closed, Ling helps out her daughter Nadia Liu Spelman in Nadia's restaurant Dumpling Daughter.

Ling left the industry in 2010.

== Legacy ==
Jasper White's has credited a chef who worked nearby at Sally Ling's with inspiring his well-known pan roasted lobster.
