= Gabriel Frasca =

American chef

Gabriel Frasca is an American chef and restaurateur. He has worked in notable kitchens in Europe and the U.S., and has been an executive chef at Straight Wharf Restaurant on Nantucket since 2006. He is also co-owner of the neighboring Straight Wharf Fish Market and restaurant.

== Biography ==
Frasca grew up on the North Shore of Massachusetts, in Beverley and Hamilton.

Following part-time jobs at a Hamilton ice cream shop and with a caterer in Beverly; Frasca began cooking at the age of 17 at the White Rainbow in Gloucester.

He attended Kenyon College, where he studied journalism. In 1994, at age 20, he was cooking French cuisine for James Beard Award-winner Gordon Hamersley at Hamersley's Bistro.

In 1996, he joined the kitchen at Chez Henri in Cambridge, Massachusetts, where Fasca worked with Paul O'Connell and Amanda Lydon, with whom he would later have two children. In 1997, he and Lydon relocated together, to Provence, France, where he worked at the L’abbaye de Saint Croix. He later staged for Michelin-three-star chef Martin Berasategui in San Sebastián, Spain. Frasca subsequently worked at Dolomites restaurant in Italy, with Norbert Neiderkofler at St. Hubertus.

In Italy, he met American chef David Bouley, for whom Frasca next help open the Danube restaurant in New York City. In 1999, Frasca moved to Manhattan and worked at Bouley Bakery (which earned a four-star rating from The New York Times) before the opening of Danube (which received three).

In 2000, he returned to Boston to pursue his first chef position. In 2001, he was hired by his friend Seth Woods, at the newly opened Aquitaine Bistro. He was recognized by The Improper Bostonian as Boston's 2001 Rising Star.

He also began working at Radius in 2001, owned by Michael Schlow, which subsequently won the Best Overall Restaurant Award from Boston Magazine, and added to the top 25 restaurants by Gourmet.

In November 2003, Frasca took over Spire restaurant—a couple of years later the Boston Magazine named him Best Chef, Up and Coming. He was also awarded three stars by the Boston Globe. In 2006, he and Lydon became a co-executive chefs of the Straight Wharf Restaurant in Nantucket, which had opened on July 4, 1976; the same year, Frasca received the Rising Stars Award.

He also appeared on Fetch! With Ruff Ruffman, season 1, episode 15: "Tryin' Chef".

Frasca and business partner Kevin Burleson faced obstacles on Nantucket prior to opening their Straight Wharf Fish Market next to the Straight Wharf Restaurant. The waterfront venue opened in June 2023, and features a fish market, ice cream shop, and restaurant.
