= Jody Adams =

Jody Adams may refer to:

- Jody Adams (basketball) (born 1972), basketball coach
- Jody Adams (chef) (born c. 1956), American chef and restaurateur
