= Jacky Robert =

American chef (born 1950)

Jacky Robert (born 13 September 1950) is an American chef who helped to create fusion cuisine in the 1980s. He is the cofounder, with Martha Castano, of the non-profit OnBoardForKids.Org

== Early years ==
Born in Granville, France, Robert began to cook at age 15. After apprenticing at Les Gourmets in Granville, he moved to Paris, where he then worked at Prunier Traktir and at the Michelin three-star rated Maxim's, working with Wolfgang Puck. Robert staged at Moulin de Mougins, Roger Vergé's three-star Michelin restaurant and at the Hotel Negresco in Nice with Jacques Maximin. Robert worked at Olympia Turm in Munich, Chez Valentino in Geneva, and Auberge de Riquewhir, Paris. Robert then worked at The Dome of the Four Seasons, Fort Lauderdale, Florida, and Le Cordon Bleu in Dania, Florida, Chillingsworth in Brewster, Massachusetts, and in 1976, helped open Maison Robert, whose owner was his uncle, Lucien Robert, in Boston's Old City Hall.

== Career ==
After moving to San Francisco, California, Robert worked as executive chef of Ernie's until 1985. He was inducted into the Maîtres Cuisiniers de France (Master Chefs of French) thanks to mentor Rene Verdon, the executive chef at the White House during the presidency of John F. Kennedy. In 1985, he became chef-owner of Amelio's and became the recipient of the 1989 Wine Spectator Grand Award. During his time in San Francisco, Robert was president of the Club Culinaire Français de Californie (French Culinary Club of California). Alongside Alice Waters, Jeremiah Tower and Mark Miller, Robert was featured in the PBS series "The Great Chefs of San Francisco." Robert appeared in additional PBS broadcasts with Emmy award-winning chef Martin Yan.

In 1996, Robert returned to Maison Robert, in Boston, this time as executive chef. In 2001, he accepted the position of executive chef at Lydia Shire's Locke-Ober restaurant in Boston. In 2003, Robert moved to Cape Cod as culinary director at the Chatham Bars Inn. Since 2004, Robert has been chef/co-owner of Petit Robert Bistro, which had five locations in the greater Boston area at its peak; it is now one restaurant in the South End. He is responsible for their "culinary vision" and day-to-day operation. He runs Ma Maison in Beacon Hill, Boston.

== Awards ==
- 2007 North American recipient of the Maîtres Cuisiniers de France (Master Chefs of France) Toque D'Argent (Silver Chef's Hat), awarded by the Maitres-Cuisiniers de France

== See also ==
- Jacky Robert studied Taekwondo with Michael J. O'Malley
