= Serda =

Serda is a surname. Notable people with the surname include:

- Clyde Serda (born 1952), American chef and writer
- Julia Serda (1875–1965), Austrian stage and film actress

== See also ==
- Cerda (disambiguation)
