= Richard Newbold Adams =

American anthropologist

- Born: August 4, 1924
- Died: September 11, 2018 (aged 94); Panajachel, Guatemala
- Education: University of Michigan (BA); Yale University (MA, PhD)
- Occupation: Anthropologist
- Parent: Randolph Greenfield Adams
- Relatives: Thomas R. Adams (brother); Lida Stokes Adams (aunt); Jody Adams (chef) (niece)

Richard Newbold Adams (August 4, 1924 – September 11, 2018) was an American anthropologist.

His parents were Randolph Greenfield Adams and Helen Spiller Adams. He grew up in Ann Arbor, Michigan. Adams served in the United States military during World War II, then pursued postsecondary education, obtaining a bachelor's degree from the University of Michigan in 1947, followed by a master's and doctoral degree in anthropology at Yale University in 1949 and 1951, respectively. He worked in Peru and Guatemala before teaching at Michigan State University starting in 1956. Adams joined the University of Texas at Austin faculty in 1961. He received a Guggenheim fellowship in 1973, and was named the Rapoport Centennial Professor of Liberal Arts prior to his retirement in 1990.

Adams married Betty Hannstein in 1951, with whom he had three children. The couple moved to Guatemala in retirement. Adams died in Panajachel on September 11, 2018, aged 94.
