= Cerda (disambiguation) =

Cerda may refer to:

== Places ==
- Cerda, municipality in the Province of Palermo, Italy
- Cerdà, municipality in the Valencian Community, Spain
- Ildefons Cerdà (Barcelona Metro), railway station in Barcelona
- Pedro Aguirre Cerda, Chile, commune in Santiago Province, Chile

== People ==
Cerdá Spanish spelling

- Antonio Cerdá, Argentine professional golfer

Cerdà Catalan spelling

- Clotilde Cerdà (1861–1926), Spanish harpist
- Ildefons Cerdà, Catalan urban planner
- Nacho Cerdà, Catalan film director
- Agustí Cerdà i Argent 1965) Catalan politician

De la Cerda

- Charles de la Cerda, Franco-Castilian nobleman
- Pedro Messía de la Cerda, Spanish naval officer

Cerda

- David Cerda, American playwright
- Eduardo Cerda (1933–2025), Chilean politician
- Emmanuel Cerda, Mexican football player
- Jaime Cerda (born 1978), Major League Baseball pitcher
- Pedro Aguirre Cerda (1879–1941), President of Chile, 1938–1941

== See also ==
- Serda
