= Scampo (restaurant) =

- Interactive map of Scampo

Restaurant information
- Owners: Lydia Shire, The Lyons Group
- Manager: Jay Baker
- Food type: Italian
- Location: 215 Charles Street, Boston, Suffolk, Massachusetts, 02114
- Coordinates: 42.36195°N 71.07039°W
- Website: www.scampoboston.com

Scampo is the “sixth culinary destination” opened by Lydia Shire in Boston's Liberty Hotel in 2008. Scampo is part of The Lyons Group.

Scampo was designed by Rafael Alvarez and Brannen Brock.

== Honors ==
Esquire, in 2008, named Scampo one of America's best new restaurants, saying it “defies tradition with its Italian-inspired cuisine unrestrained by borders and inspired by flavors of the Mediterranean and Middle East.”

In 2015, it was voted Boston's best Italian restaurant.

Boston Magazine named them Best Neighborhood Restaurant, Beacon Hill.
