= Fairmont Copley Plaza =

Hotel in Boston, Massachusetts

Coordinates: 42.349295°N 71.076286°W

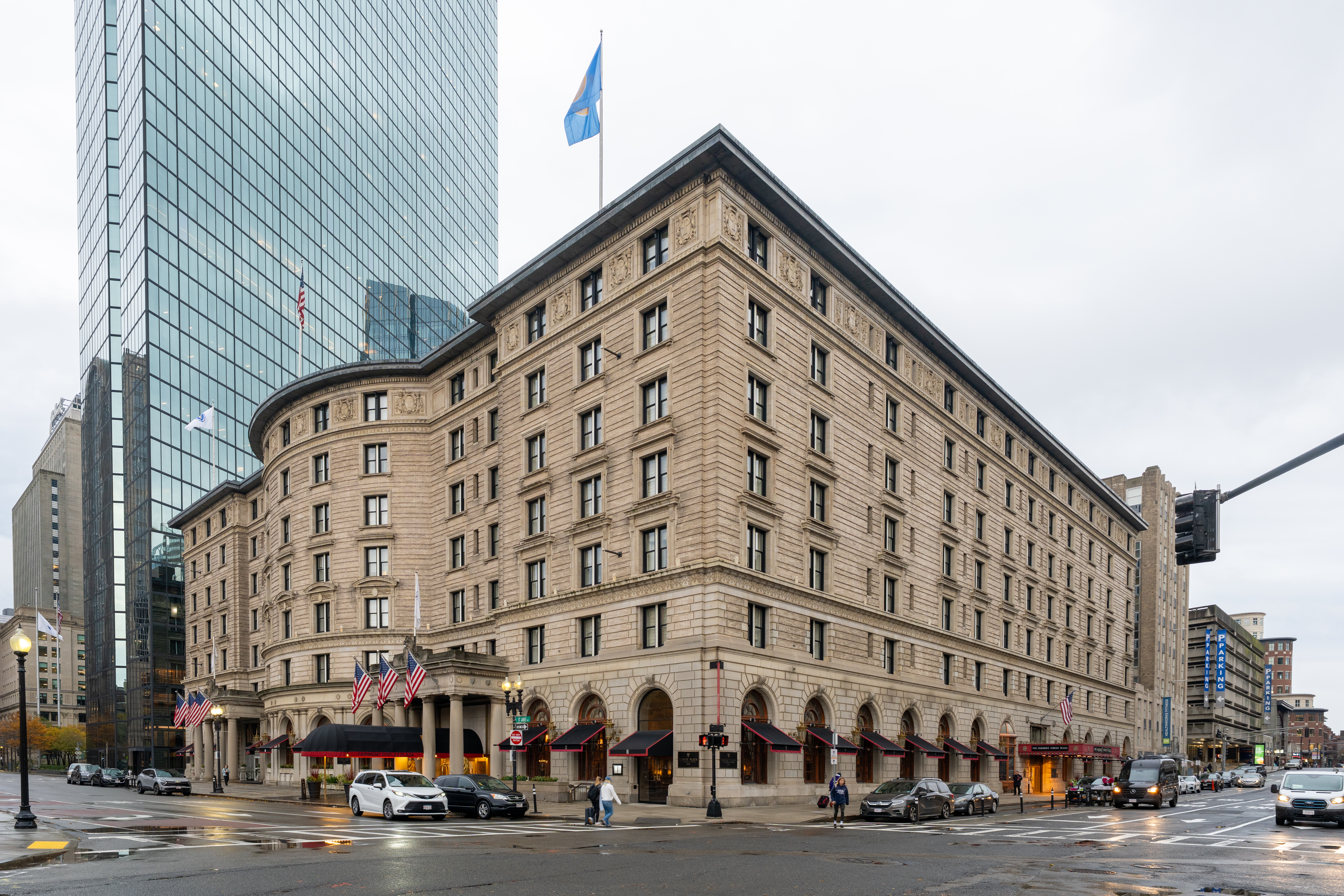
- (2025)

General information
- Location: 138 St. James Avenue; Boston, Massachusetts; United States
- Opening: 1912
- Owner: Ashkenazy Acquisition Corp.
- Operator: Fairmont Hotels and Resorts

Design and construction
- Architect: Henry Janeway Hardenbergh

Other information
- Number of rooms: 383

Website
- Fairmont Copley Plaza

The Fairmont Copley Plaza is a Forbes four-star, AAA four-diamond hotel in the Back Bay neighborhood of Boston, Massachusetts, managed by Fairmont Hotels and Resorts. It stands on Copley Square, part of an architectural ensemble that includes Henry N. Cobb's John Hancock Tower, Henry Hobson Richardson's Trinity Church, and Charles Follen McKim's Boston Public Library.

The Fairmont Copley Plaza is recognized as one of the Historic Hotels of America, a program of the National Trust for Historic Preservation. The Boston Landmarks Commission designated it as a Boston Landmark in 2026.

== Construction and opening ==
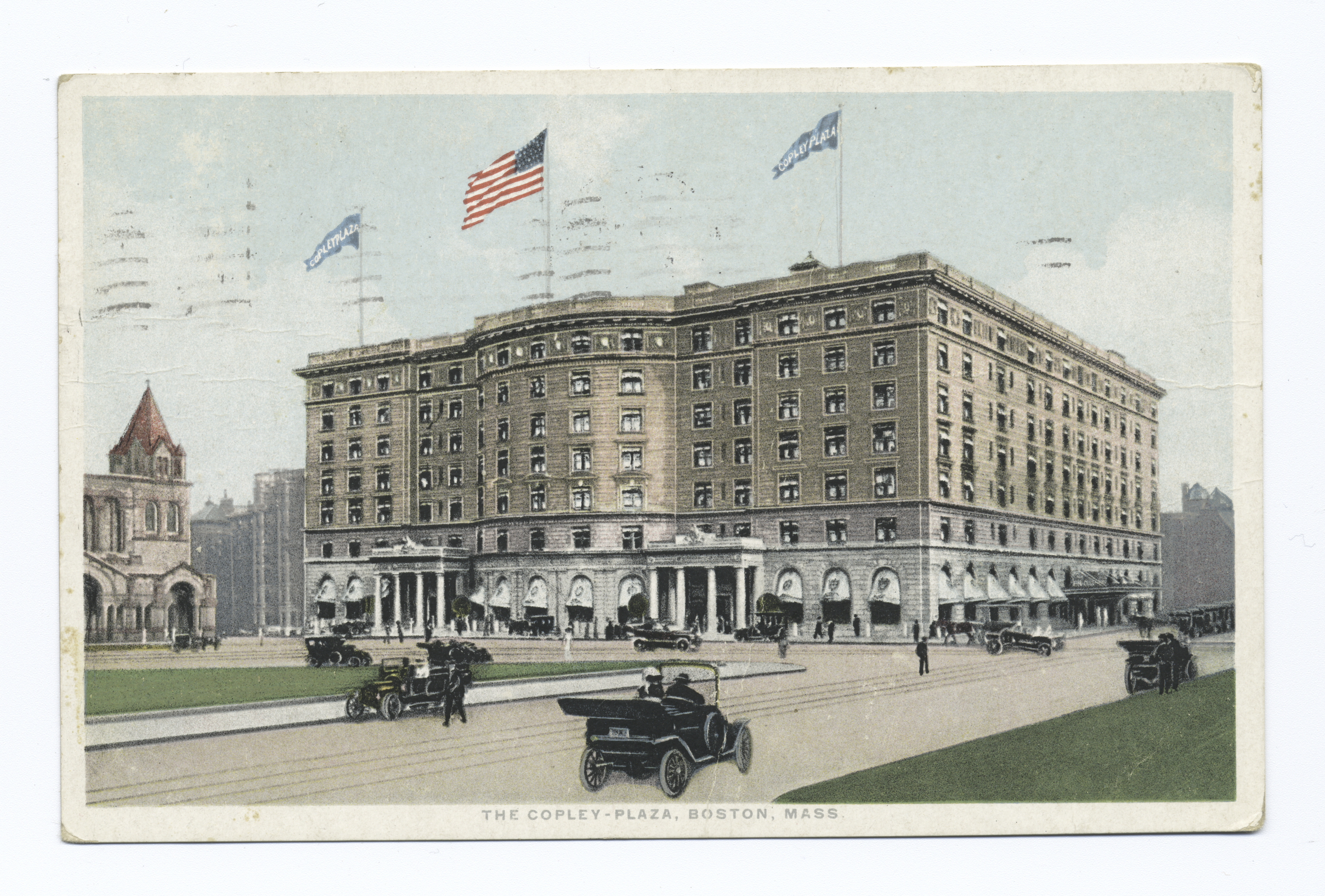
The hotel in the 1920s

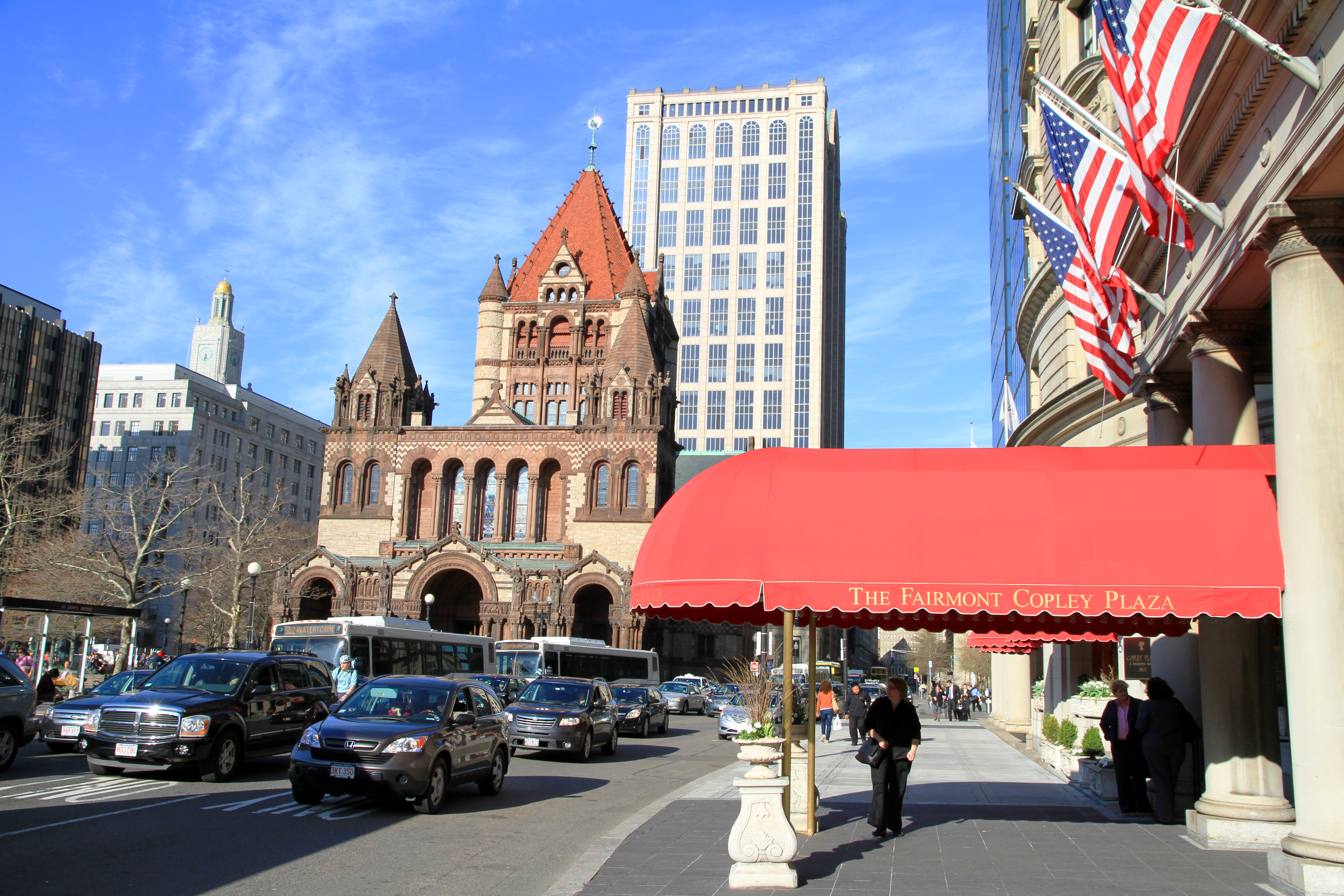
Copley Square in 2013, the hotel entrance on the right

The Copley Plaza was built on the original site of the Museum of Fine Arts and named in honor of John Singleton Copley, an American painter. The total cost was $5.5 million.

The hotel's architect was Henry Janeway Hardenbergh, who also designed other hotels, including the Willard Hotel in Washington, D.C., and the Plaza Hotel in New York City, the Copley Plaza's sister hotel. The seven-floor hotel is constructed of limestone and buff brick in the Beaux-Arts style. The E-shaped building is supported by pilings driven to a depth of 70 feet (21 m) below the street level.

When it opened in 1912, Boston Mayor John F. Fitzgerald presided over a reception with over a thousand guests. Rooms had been booked as early as 16 months in advance. Its first manager, who also lived at the hotel, served for 22 years and he and the hotel were so prominent as to merit an obituary in the New York Times. It became for some years the site of the annual Harvard-Yale dance and other post-football dances, denounced by the authorities of local women's colleges who forbade their students from attending: "These dances have nothing to do with the colleges in question, but have merely a financial interest in them. There is not doubt that they are of an extremely questionable nature owing to the fact that they are entirely opened to the public."

The hotel marked its centennial with another ribbon-cutting ceremony by Boston Mayor Thomas Menino on August 16, 2012.

== Ownership ==
Sheraton Hotels bought The Copley Plaza in 1941. They renamed it the Sheraton-Plaza Hotel in 1951 and operated it under that name until 1972, when they sold it to John Hancock Insurance for $6.5 million. The new owners renamed the hotel The Copley Plaza, but Sheraton continued to operate the property until 1974, when John Hancock hired Boston hospitality management firm Hotels of Distinction's Alan Tremain to run The Copley Plaza. During this time, the restaurants in the hotel were considered some of the best in the city and featured such chefs as Lydia Shire, Jasper White, and Gordon Hamersley.

John Hancock sold the hotel in 1988 for $56 million to local businessman James A. Daley, in partnership with a subsidiary of Harvard University. In 1993, Harvard brought in Wyndham Hotels & Resorts to manage The Copley Plaza and it became The Copley Plaza - A Wyndham Hotel.

In September 1996, Saudi Prince Al Waleed bin Talal Al Saud and Olympus Real Estate Corporation partnered to buy the hotel from Harvard for $70 million. Fairmont Hotels, which Prince Al Waleed then owned a controlling interest in, assumed management of the hotel, which was renamed The Fairmont Copley Plaza Boston.

On September 21, 1999, Prince Al Waleed bought out Olympus's share of the hotel, assuming 100% ownership. Between 1999 and 2001, Fairmont Hotels was significantly reorganized, with Prince Al Waleed only owning a 16.5% stake in the resulting company. On July 24, 2001, Fairmont Hotels bought a 50% stake in the hotel from Prince Al Waleed for $23 million. On February 11, 2003, Fairmont bought out Prince Al Waleed's remaining 50% stake in the hotel for a further $23 million. By this point, Prince Al Waleed's direct stake in Fairmont had decreased to 4.9%.

Fairmont sold the hotel to FelCor Lodging Trust Inc. in September 2010 for $98.5 million. This was part of Fairmont's movement away from direct real estate ownership, but Fairmont continued to manage the hotel. FelCor was sold to RLJ Lodging Trust in April 2017, and RLJ sold the hotel in December 2017 to Ashkenazy Acquisition Corp. for $170 million. The hotel has more recently been branded simply as Fairmont Copley Plaza.

== Features ==
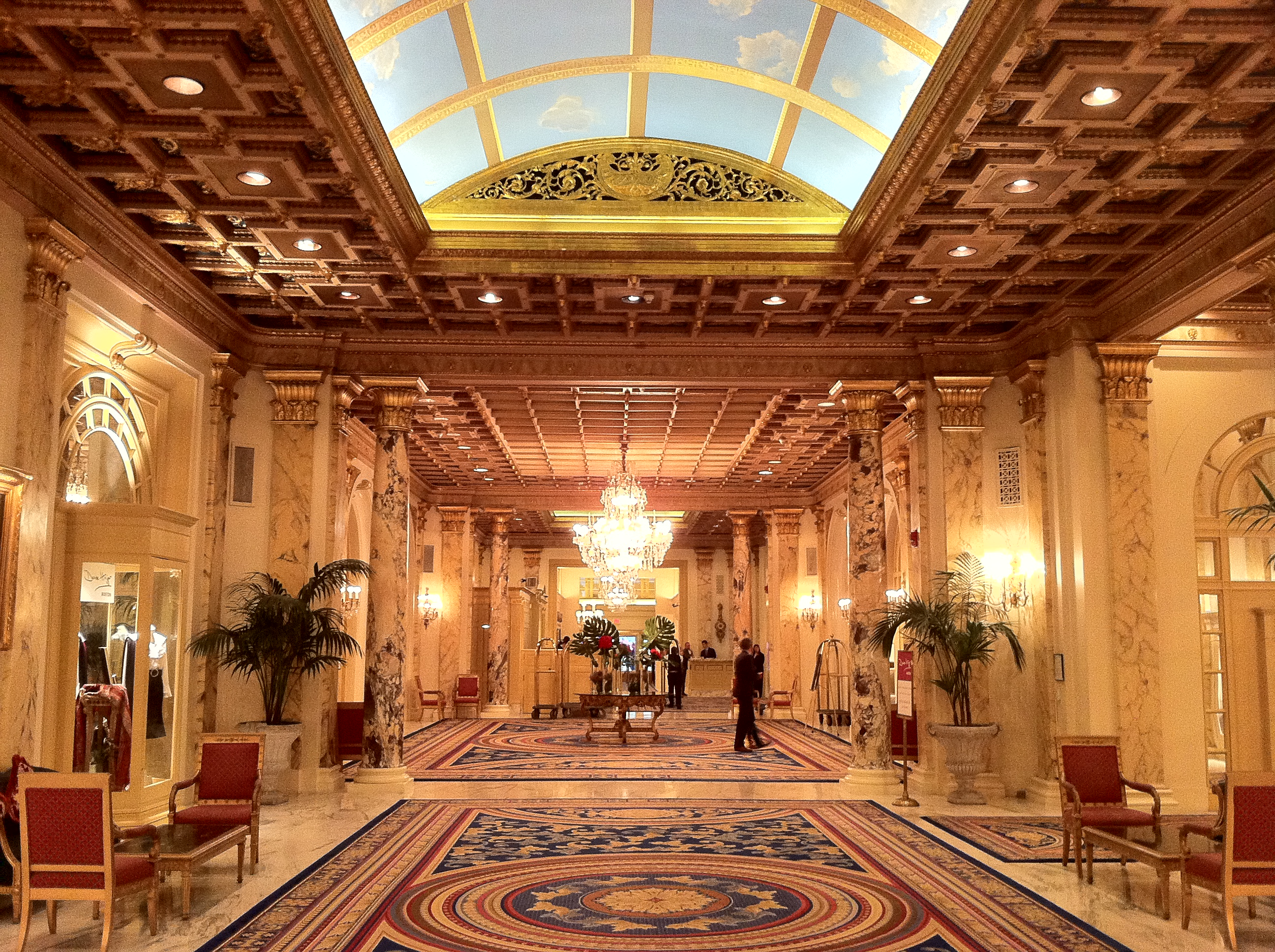
Peacock Alley

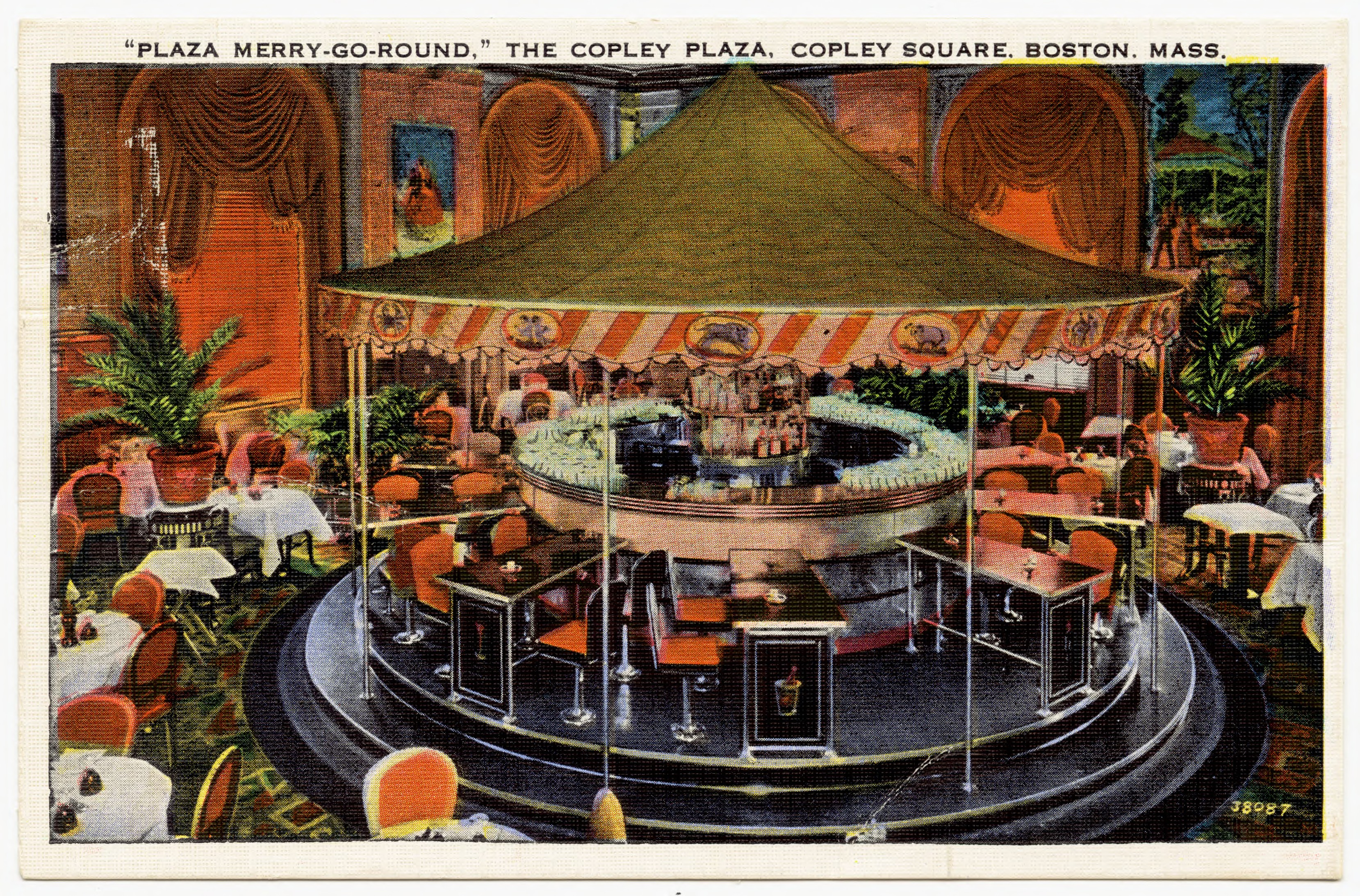
From approximately 1930–1945, this circular bar was located at the Copley Plaza.

The entrance hallway has been called "Peacock Alley" since the 1920s. The 5,000-square-foot (460 m^{2}) lobby has a 21-foot (6.4 m) high gilded coffered ceiling with matching Empire style crystal chandeliers and Italian marble columns. Much of the classical architecture and decor has been preserved, including the back-to-back "P" monogram.

== Historical events ==
From its opening, the hotel was a center of the social life of Boston's elite. In 1913, Hamilton Fish, Jr., held a "Lenten dance" where "society leaders ... from New York, Philadelphia, Chicago, Washington and Boston greeted the coming of daylight this morning at the Copley Plaza Hotel".

In the 1920s, John Singer Sargent kept rooms at the hotel and painted portraits there. Sargent used one of the hotel's employees, a black elevator operator named Thomas McKeller, as the model for the Greek god Apollo in his decoration of Boston's Museum of Fine Arts.

Frederick Kerry, paternal grandfather of US Senator John Kerry, committed suicide with a gunshot to the head in the restroom of this hotel on November 23, 1921.

In the 1930s, the Boston Horse Show awarded The Copley-Plaza Challenge Trophy.

In February 1935, civic leaders held a dinner for Babe Ruth at The Copley Plaza to celebrate his return to Boston after 16 years with the New York Yankees.

On August 3, 1940, back-up catcher for the Cincinnati Reds, Willard Hershberger, despondent over a series of losses in which he performed poorly, took his own life in the bathroom of his Hotel room at the Copley Plaza. He was discovered laying beside the tub with his throat slit. He was 30 years old. His father had also committed suicide and he told Reds Manager, Bill McKechnie that he was going to "do it, too ..."

On March 29, 1979, a disgruntled former employee set multiple fires in both The Copley Plaza and the nearby Sheraton Boston hotels. The fire at the Copley Plaza, which was occupied by 430 people at the time, injured thirty and killed one. Among those injured was media mogul Sumner Redstone, who survived by hanging from a third-story window. His hand was partially paralyzed from the fire. Film director Rob Cohen was also rescued from the fire, which partly inspired his 1996 film Daylight.

== Celebrity guests ==
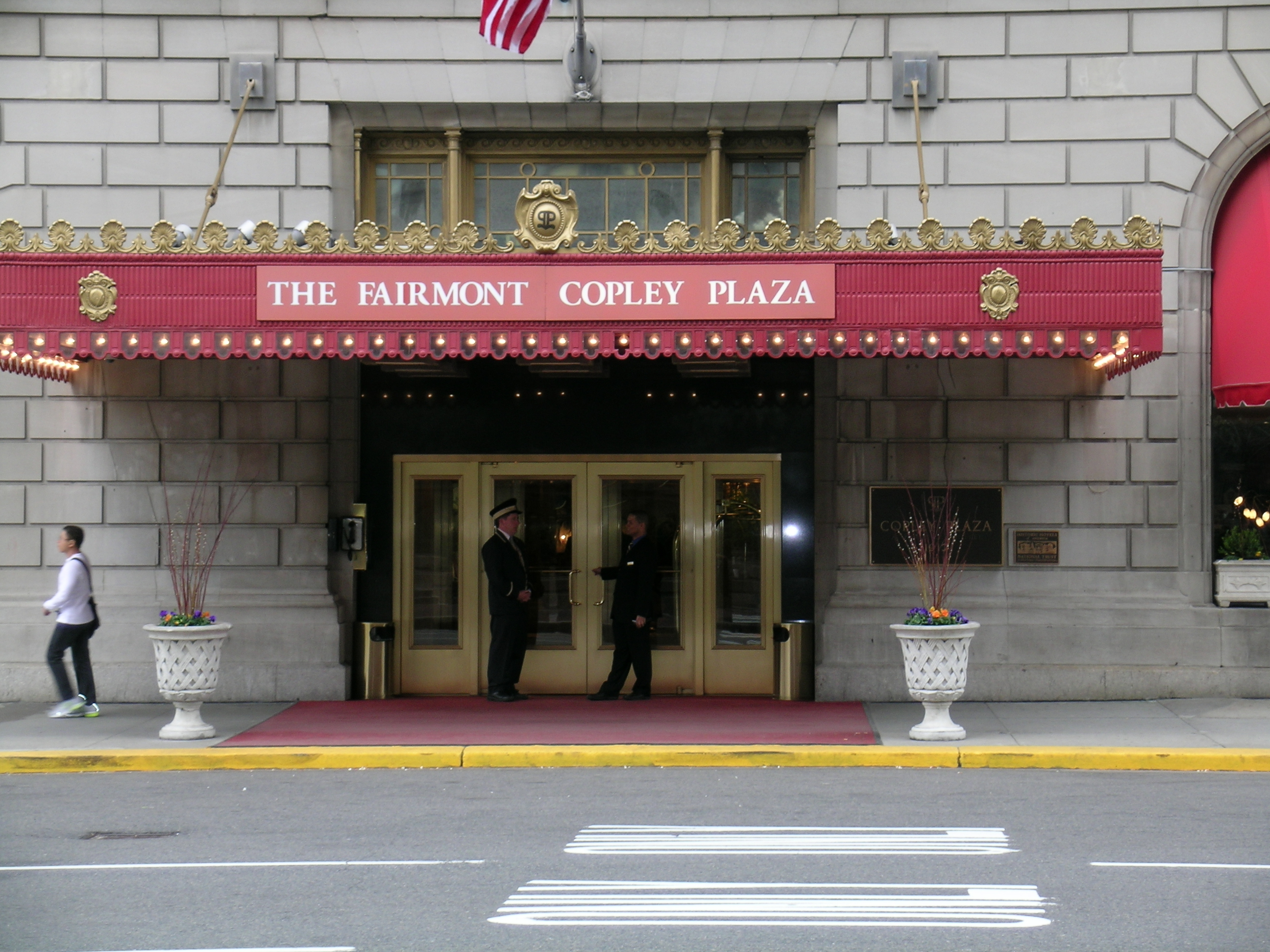
The Dartmouth Street entrance to the Fairmont Copley Plaza

The Copley Plaza Hotel has been host to many famous people. Every US President since William Howard Taft, and royalty from Greece, Thailand, Abyssinia, Saudi Arabia, Iran, Belgium, Denmark, and the United Kingdom have visited the hotel. Celebrities including John Lennon, Tony Bennett, Lena Horne, Frank Sinatra, and Luciano Pavarotti have also been guests. Elizabeth Taylor and Richard Burton chose the Copley Plaza for their second honeymoon.

== In popular culture ==
The climax of Robert B. Parker's 1973 Spenser novel The Godwulf Manuscript takes place in Room 411 of the hotel.

The hotel provides the setting of a few scenes in the 1999 cult classic film The Boondock Saints. Other movies and TV shows filmed at the property include The Equalizer 2, The Firm, Bride Wars, and American Hustle.

The fictional Tipton Hotel from the Disney Channel Sitcom, The Suite Life of Zack & Cody shares the same address as the real hotel, 138 St. James Avenue. This, along with the Hotel Vancouver, would serve as the inspiration for the Tipton.
