= Rialto (restaurant) =

Restaurant information
- Established: 1994
- Closed: June 26, 2016
- Previous owners: sapphire Hospitality Group: Gary Sullivan, Jody Adams, Michela Larson, Karen Haskell
- Head chef: David Ladner
- Food type: Italian
- Location: 1 Bennett Street, Cambridge, Middlesex, Massachusetts, 02138

Rialto was a restaurant in Harvard Square’s Charles Hotel owned by Jody Adams and Michela Larson. Opened in 1994, it closed on June 22, 2016. Originally, it was announced she would leave the restaurant in the hands of executive chef David Ladner, but it was later announced it would close down.

They were known for their regional tasting menu, slow roasted Long Island duck and lobster and saffron bucatini.

== Alumni ==
- Carolyn Johnson Chef de cuisine
- Joanne Chang was a pastry chef.

== Awards and honors ==
- Boston (magazine) 1998 Best Mediterranean Restaurant, Contemporary
- Esquire (magazine) named it one of the best restaurants in the country and one of The Top 20 New Restaurants in the Country
- Gourmet (magazine) named it one of the world's best hotel restaurants
