= Maison Robert =

Restaurant information
- Established: 1972
- Closed: 2004
- Previous owner: Lucien Robert
- Manager: Andree Robert
- Food type: French
- Location: 45 School Street, Boston, Suffolk, Massachusetts

Maison Robert was a French restaurant in the Old City Hall section of Boston from 1972 until it closed in 2004. Kerry Byrne of the Boston Herald described it as "the city’s center of sophisticated dining and power lunches … was widely considered one of the nation’s best restaurants and created a stir in Boston’s culinary, social and political circles."

The restaurant was owned by Lucien and Martha Ann Robert. Daughter Andree was co-owner and general manager. Lydia Shire worked there as a salad girl in 1971, and Jacky Robert served as Executive Chef.
