= Michela Larson =

Michela Larson is a Boston area chef. The Boston Globe called her one of the city’s “trailblazing female restaurateurs in an era when they were few and far between.”

Larson was partners with Jody Adams in opening Rialto in Harvard Square. With Gary Sullivan, she owned Rocca in the South End of Boston. Tiffani Faison was the executive chef when it closed.

With Gary Sullivan and Karen Haskell, she was a principal of the Sapphire Restaurant Group. Her eponymous restaurant, which opened in 1985 in the Carter Ink Building and was one of the first women owned restaurants in the city, was a solo venture at first. The group was part of Rialto (and Jody Adams was part of the group).

In 2014, she opened a restaurant in Boca Raton, Florida called the blue. And in 2019, she opened Mod Espresso, a European style coffee bar.
