= Thomas R. Adams =

American librarian (1921–2008)

- Education: University of Michigan
- Children: Jody Adams (chef)
- Parent: Randolph Greenfield Adams
- Relatives: Green Adams (great-grandfather); Richard Newbold Adams (brother)

Thomas Randolph Adams (May 22, 1921 – December 1, 2008) was librarian of the John Carter Brown Library and John Hay Professor of Bibliography and University Bibliographer at Brown University.

== Early life, education, and family ==
The son of Randolph G. Adams and Helen Spiller Adams, Thomas Adams was born in Durham, North Carolina, and grew up in Ann Arbor, Michigan, where his father was librarian of the William L. Clements Library, part of the University of Michigan Library system. Adams served in the U. S. Navy during World War II, and graduated from the University of Michigan in 1944. He received an MA from the University of Pennsylvania in 1949. In 1951, he married Virginia Matzke Adams, with whom he had three daughters: Virginia Hedges Adams, Josephine Lippincott Adams, and Eliza Stokes Adams.

== Career as a rare book librarian ==
Adams began his career in rare books in 1947 at the Library Company of Philadelphia. He served as curator of rare books in the Van Pelt-Dietrich Library at the University of Pennsylvania from 1950 to 1955. In 1955, he was appointed Custodian of the Chapin Library at Williams College, remaining there until 1957, when he was appointed Librarian of The John Carter Brown Library. He retired from that position in 1983, and stayed on as University Professor at Brown until 1991.

Adams served on the boards and advisory committees of many institutions including the Rhode Island Historical Society, Rhode Island School of Design, Providence Athenaeum and Mystic Seaport Museum.

He served on the Council of the Bibliographical Society of America, 1969–1980, and as its president, 1978–1980. He was a Guggenheim Fellow in 1963, a National Endowment for the Humanities Senior Fellow in 1971, and recipient of several National Endowment for the Humanities and Mellon Foundation publication grants. He was a member of the American Antiquarian Society, Massachusetts Historical Society, Colonial Society of Massachusetts, Club of Odd Volumes, Grolier Club, as well as the Century and Barnstable Yacht Clubs.

He was the 2008 recipient of the John Carter Brown Library Medal, in recognition of distinguished service to the Library. He died in Providence, Rhode Island on December 1, 2008.

== Published works ==
- American Independence: The Growth of an Idea (1965)
- The American Controversy: A Bibliographical Study of the British Pamphlets about the American Disputes, 1764-1783 (1980)
- English Maritime Books Before 1801, with D. W. Waters (1995).
- Defining Americana: The Evolution of The John Carter Brown Library (2008).
