= Thomas McNaughton =

American chef, restaurateur and cookbook writer

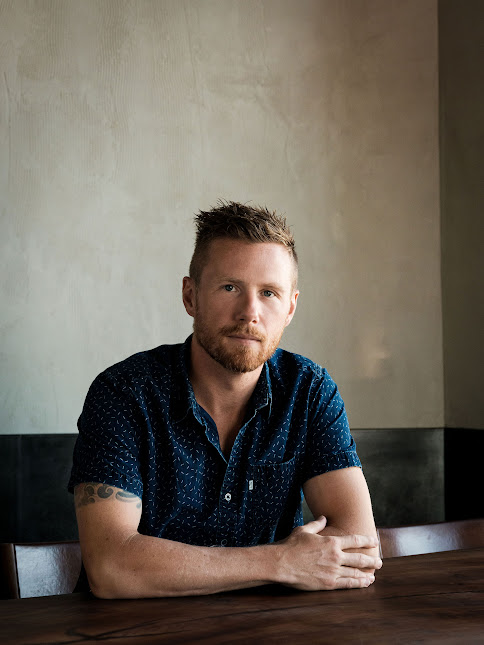
- Born: October 9, 1983 (age 43); Tabernacle Township, New Jersey, United States
- Education: Culinary Institute of America
- Culinary career
- Cooking style: California cuisine
- Current restaurants
- "flour+water" (San Francisco, California); "flour+water pizzeria" (San Francisco, California); "penny roma" (San Francisco, California); "flour + water pasta shop" (San Francisco, California)

Thomas McNaughton (born October 9, 1983) is an American chef, restaurateur, and cookbook writer. He is the co-chef and co-founder behind Flour + Water Hospitality Group which operates Flour + Water, Penny Roma, Flour + Water Pasta Shop, and Flour + Water Pizzeria in San Francisco, California.

Thomas involvement with local farmers’ markets for the last 15+ years has enabled him to develop close relationships with various producers in the Bay Area. He has been especially dedicated to Foodwise, (formerly CUESA). These relationships are showcased across the hyper-seasonal menus at the group's restaurants.

Thomas has been nominated three years in a row by the James Beard Foundation for the Rising Star Chef of the Year Award (2011, 2010, 2013). In 2011, Forbes featured Thomas as one of 30 under 30 most influential personalities in the food and beverage world. In 2012, Thomas represented the 1920s in Food & Wine’s ‘American Icons at Every Age feature. That same year, Food & Wine Magazine named him one of the 10 ‘Empire Builders’.

== Early life and career ==
Born in Tabernacle Township, New Jersey to Noble, a nursery owner, and Dorothy McNaughton, a proprietor of Heather Fine Furnishings, Thomas was the youngest of four kids. During his teenage summers, he worked at the Medford Lakes Country Club as a dishwasher and quickly moved up to cook. It was here where he found his passion for the restaurants and cooking. The energetic and dynamic atmosphere of the kitchen fascinated him, and by the time he was 17 years old, he realized that cooking was his calling.

Thomas started attending the Culinary Institute of America in Hyde Park, New York in 2001. In 2002, he moved to the Bay Area and started working under chef Roland Passot at La Folie where he learned the fundamentals of French cooking and was exposed to the San Francisco restaurant scene for the first time. In 2002, he returned to the Culinary Institute of America and, upon graduating in 2003, officially relocated to San Francisco. He went on to become sous chef at two of the city's most respected restaurants: Gary Danko and Quince.

In addition to his time in San Francisco, Thomas traveled throughout Europe to work and stage at Michel Rostang in France, Tantrise in Germany, and Sassege in Italy. It was during his travels that he developed a passion for the techniques and traditions of Italian cooking. He then went on to apprentice at Bruno e Franco. in Bologna where he mastered the art of curing meat and pasta making, skills that still inform the approach at his restaurants today.

== Restaurants ==
=== Flour + Water ===
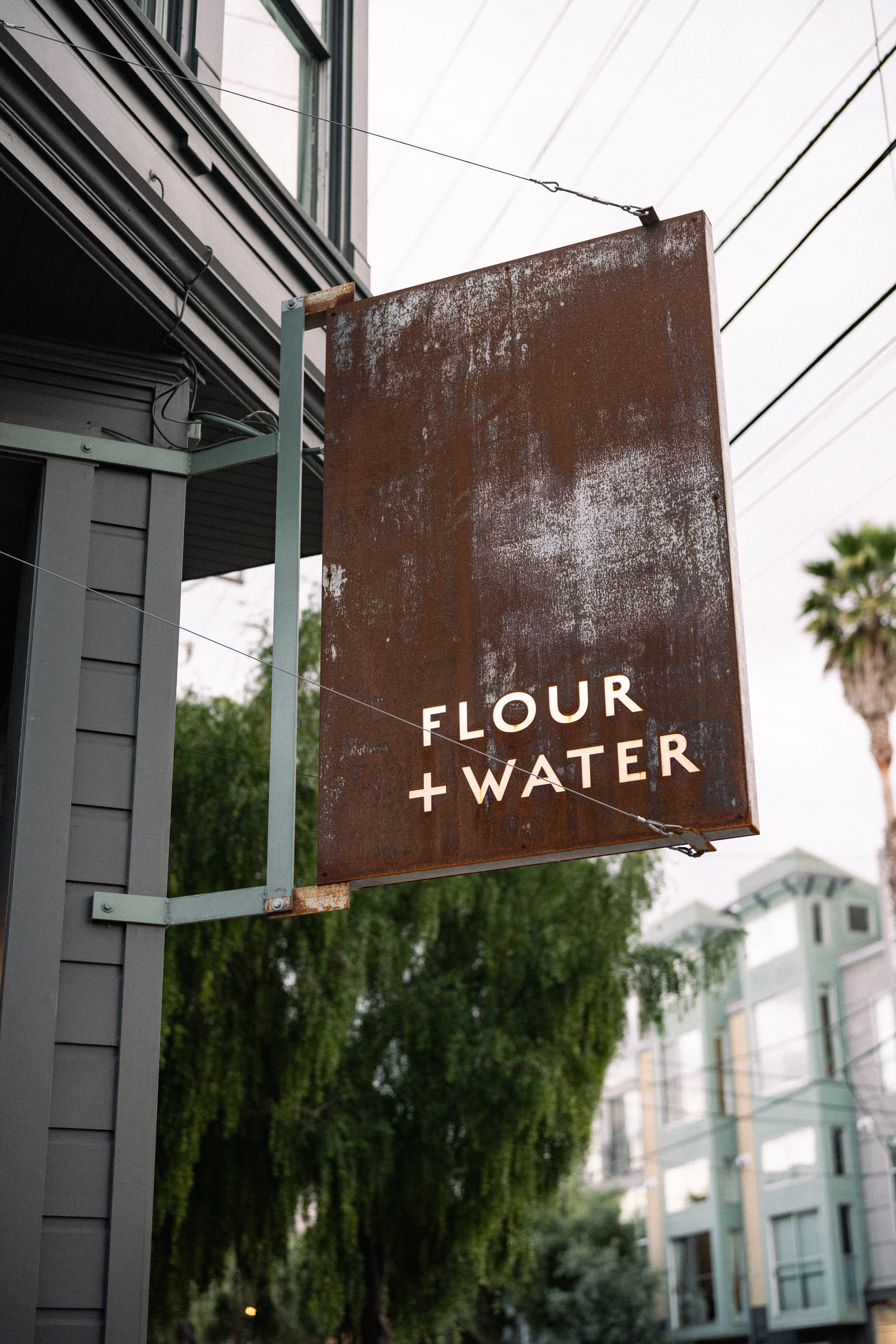

At the end of his stay in Bologna, Thomas started exploring new opportunities in San Francisco. One of those opportunities included the opening of a new Italian restaurant in the Mission District of San Francisco with partners David White and David Steele. Thomas signed on while he was still in Bologna with the beginning conceptualization of the restaurant taking place over the phone. The restaurant, Flour + Water, opened in May 2009. Thomas describes the inspiration behind it as a combination of Italian technique executed with the Northern California ingredients. Although the partners were expecting a small opening, Flour + Water was a wild success from day one.

The James Beard Foundation nominated Flour + Water for the Best New Restaurant Award in 2010. In 2011, GQ Magazine named Flour + Water one of the 10 best restaurants of the year. Since its opening, the restaurant has received multiple accolades in a number of publications, both local and national, including 7x7 (magazine), The San Francisco Chronicle, The Washington Post, The New York Times, Food and Wine, Travel + Leisure and others.

=== Penny Roma ===
*Central Kitchen closed in March 2020, it briefly reopened that fall/winter as Central Kitchen Wine Bar, before the debut of Penny Roma in October 2021.

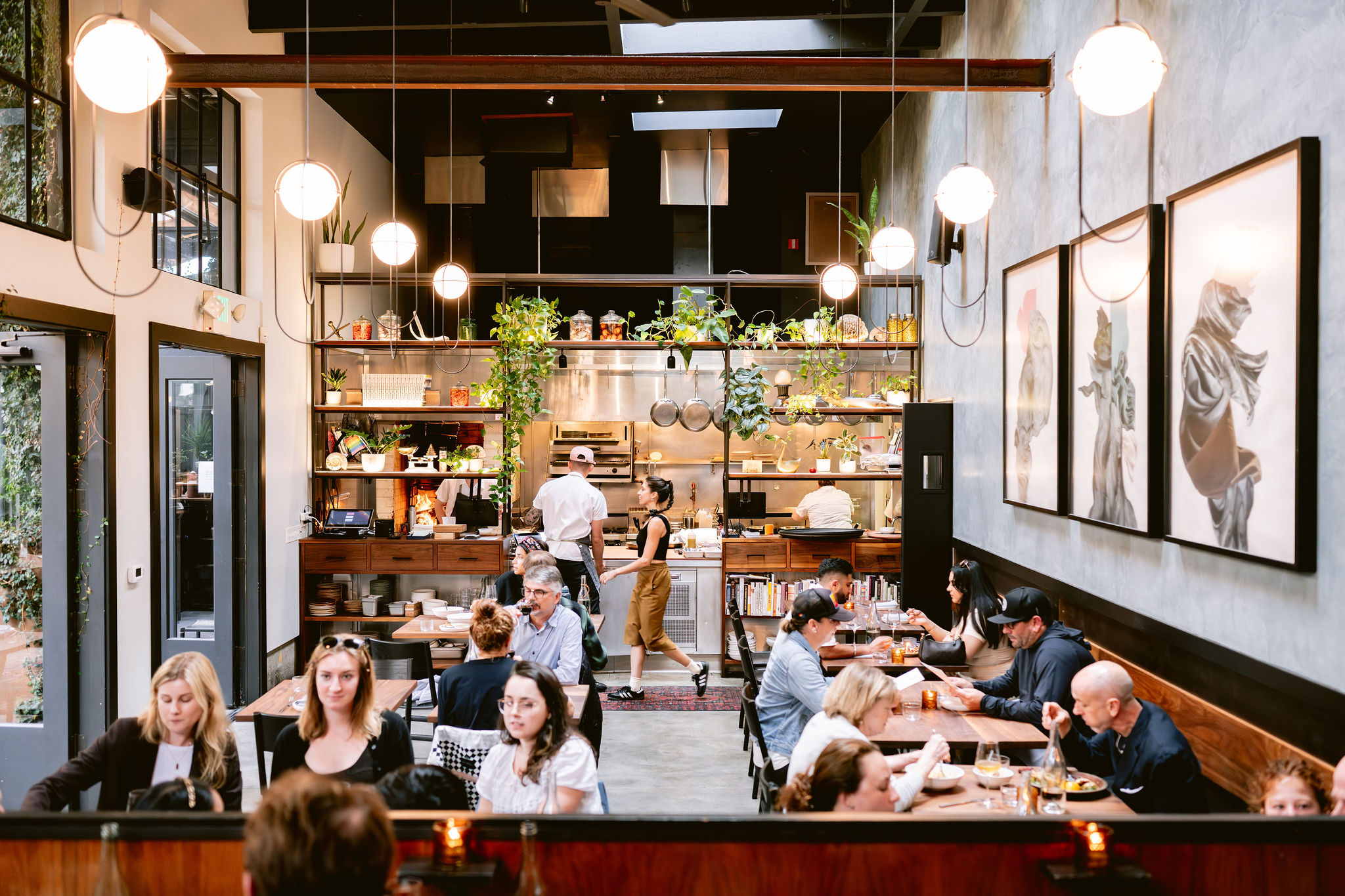
Penny Roma Dining Room

After the success of Flour + Water, Thomas and his partners, David White and David Steele, opened Central Kitchen in May 2012. Located down the street from Flour+Water it served new Californian cuisine focusing on local and sustainable produce. Central kitchen served a menu of refined food in a casual setting, allowing Thomas to highlight his fine dining background with the same reverence for local and sustainable produce showcased at Flour + Water.

Central Kitchen was acclaimed by critics and the public alike. In 2013, GQ Magazine named it one of the 12 most outstanding restaurants of the year. The restaurant received multiple mentions in local and national press, including Conde Nast Traveler, The San Francisco Chronicle, Zagat, SF Weekly and others.

=== Flour + Water Pasta Shop ===
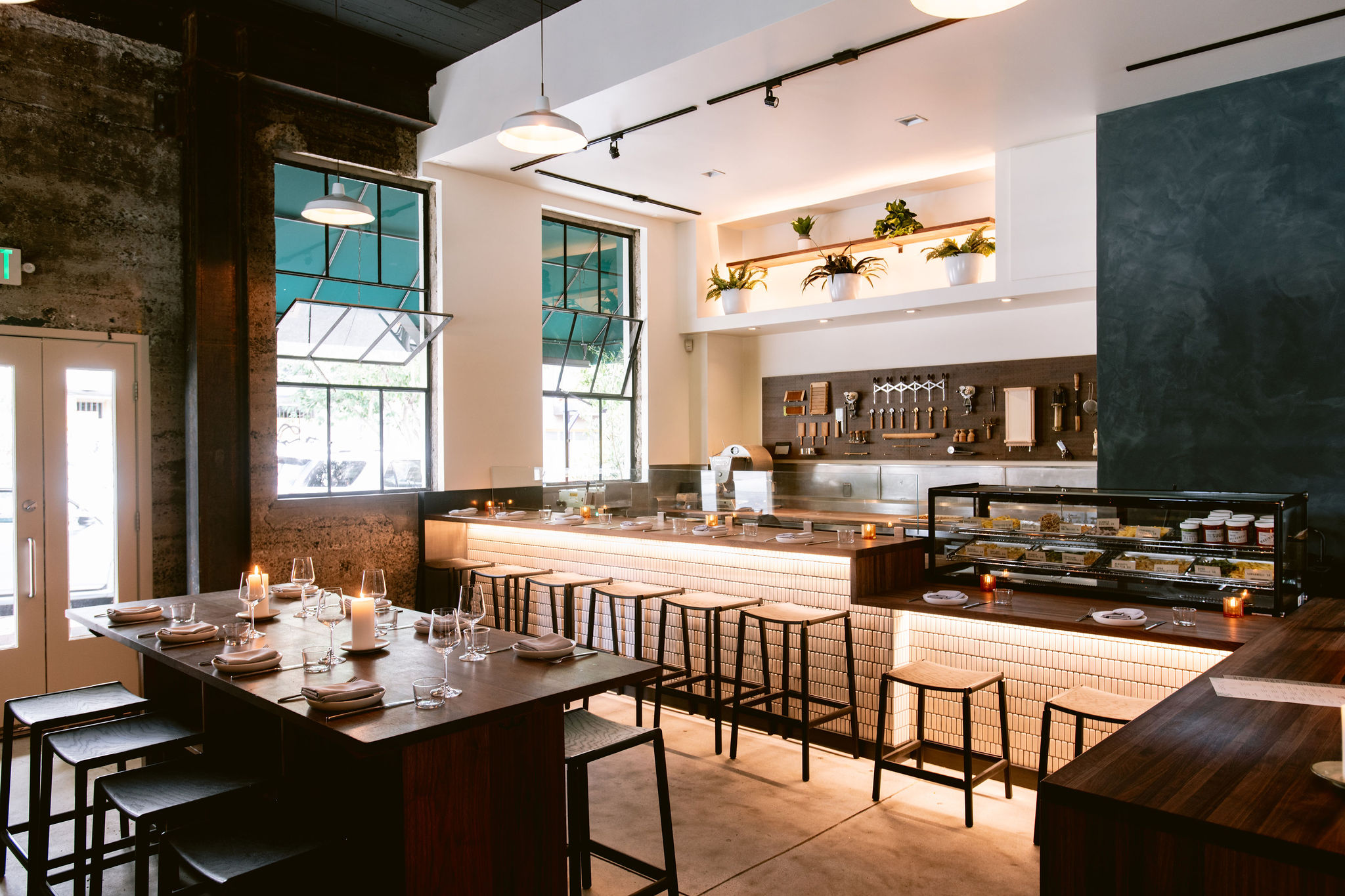
Pasta Shop

Flour + Water Pasta Shop, part of the Flour + Water Hospitality Group, is a lunch destination, bottle shop and pasta production. You will find the team making filled & extruded pastas, and sauces each day. Sandwiches and a limited number of hot pasta dishes are available until 3:30pm daily and can be consumed inside the courtyard that’s shared with Penny Roma. At 5:30pm each night, shop becomes part of the Penny Roma dining room, with counter seating so you can watch the team make pasta by hand while you dine.

== Awards ==
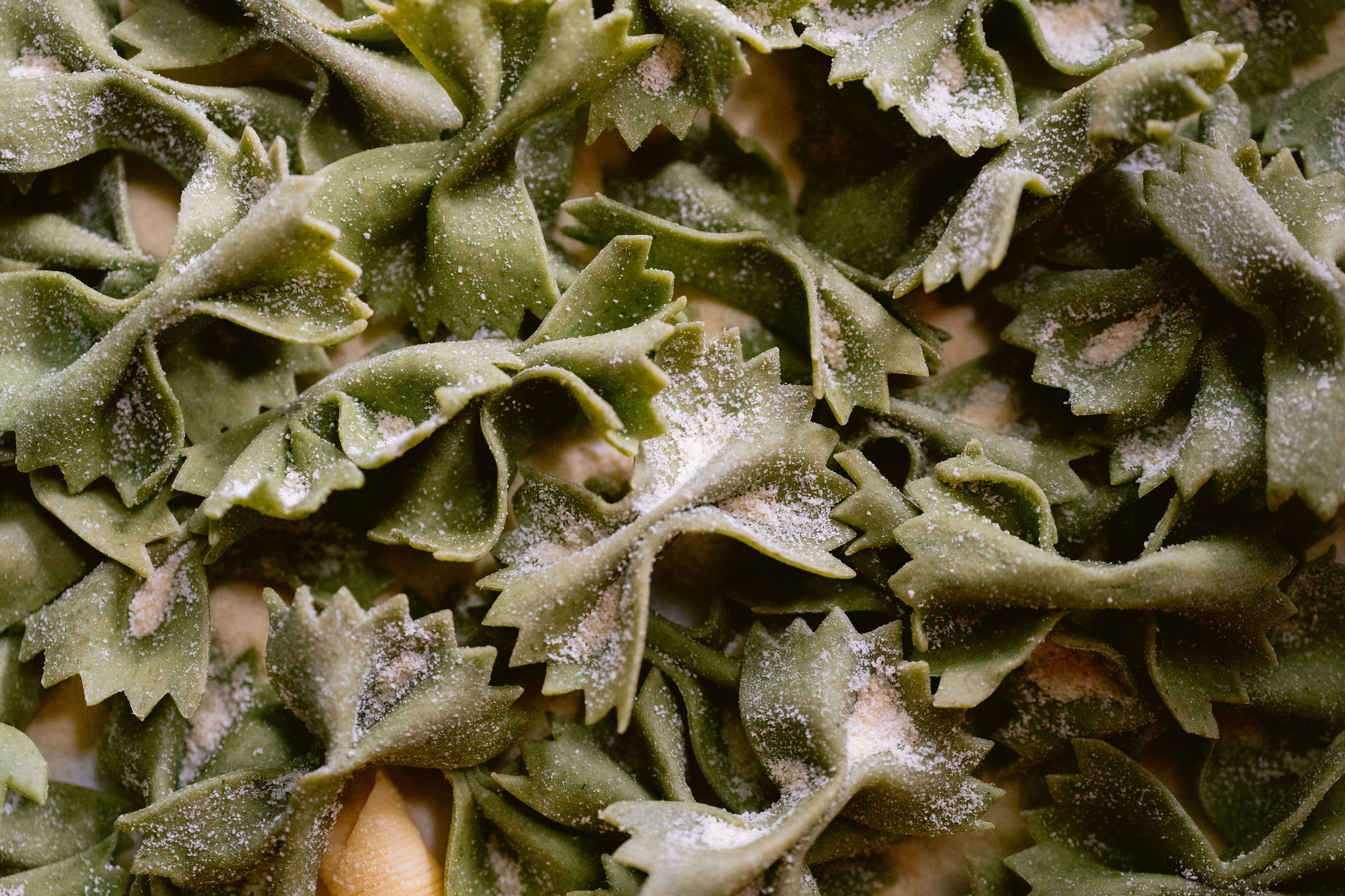

- Best New Restaurant nominee (Flour + Water), James Beard Foundation, 2010
- San Francisco's Best Pizza, Sunset Magazine, 2010
- Rising Star Chef of the Year nominee, James Beard Foundation, 2011
- 10 Best New Restaurants in America (Flour + Water), GQ, 2011
- 30 under 30 Most Influential Personalities in the Food and Beverage World, Forbes, 2011
- Rising Star Chef of the Year nominee, James Beard Foundation, 2012
- Best Italian Restaurants in the US (Flour + Water), Travel+Leisure, 2012
- Empire Builder, Food&Wine Magazine, 2012
- Rising Star Chef of the Year nominee, James Beard Foundation, 2013
- Top 100 Restaurants in San Francisco (Flour + Water, central kitchen), San Francisco Chronicle, 2013
- Best New Restaurant in San Francisco (central kitchen), Conde Nast Traveler, 2013
- 12 Most Outstanding Restaurants (central kitchen), GQ, 2013

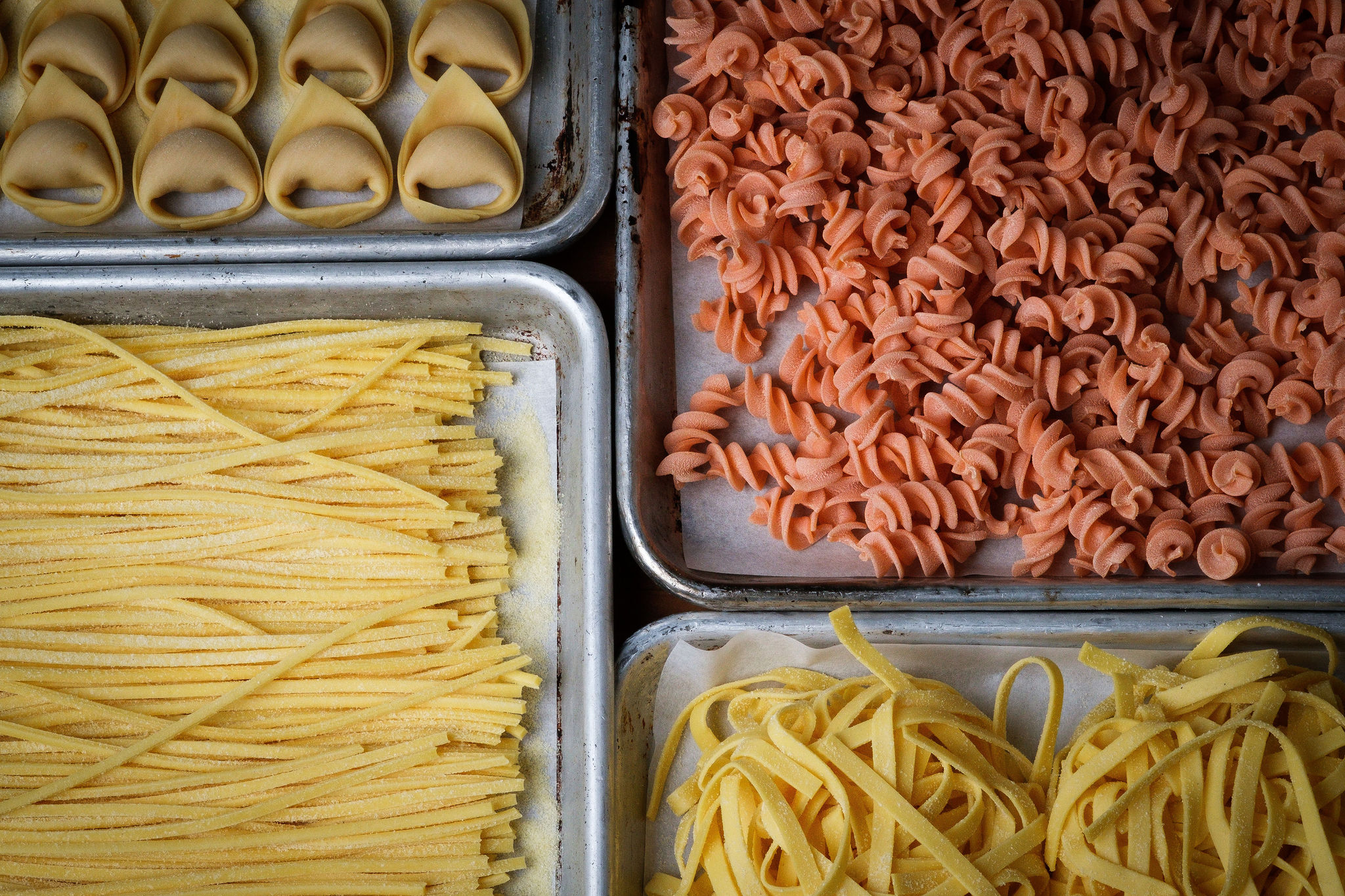
