= John Vartan =

American businessman (1945–2004)

John O. Vartan
- Born: Vartan Keosheyan; February 8, 1945; Anjar, Lebanon
- Died: December 15, 2004 (aged 59); Harrisburg, Pennsylvania
- Occupation: Entrepreneur

John O. Vartan (February 8, 1945 – December 15, 2004) was an American entrepreneur and educational philanthropist in the Harrisburg, Pennsylvania area where he lived.

== Business career ==
Vartan grew up in the Armenian village of Anjar in Lebanon, also known as Haoush Mousa. After obtaining an engineering degree from Michigan Technological University, and a master's degree from Pennsylvania State University, he started working for Gannett Fleming, Inc. in the early 1970s. He subsequently started his own firms which include:

- Vartan Group, Inc. (real estate development)
- Vartan Construction Company (building construction)
- Vartan National Bank (later sold and renamed Centric Bank in early 2007)
- Parev (restaurant business)

Vartan became an expert in developing relatively inexpensive office buildings that helped spur development in the greater Harrisburg area. Vartan capitalized on its low land prices. Often allied with Harrisburg Mayor Stephen R. Reed, Vartan helped change downtown Harrisburg by acquiring substandard residences and businesses, and constructing new office buildings in their stead.

Yet as Harrisburg developed, intense competition emerged. Faced with what he considered as unfair public subsidization and favoritism to competitors, Vartan was never hesitant in filing lawsuits against both competitors and local governments. At one point, his ambitious development plans aroused so much community opposition that he threatened to leave Harrisburg. A "Committee to Keep John Vartan in Harrisburg" was formed, and persuadedhim to stay put.

Vartan's crowning achievement was perhaps his re-establishment of Harrisburg's "Tuesday Club", founded by state Senator Harvey Taylor, in the 1950s. To help subsidize the building, he constructed the first permanent headquarters for the "Tuesday Club" at his own expense. He also established a restaurant, Parev, decorated with distinctive Armenian art, to provide another high quality restaurant for Harrisburg.

In early 1989, Vartan was diagnosed with throat cancer. Even though his cancer made it difficult for him to talk and to be understood at times, he continued with his business expansion and civic leadership. On November 22, 2004, the Management announced that the Vartan family would be taking over the operations of the "Vartan Group". Vartan died on December 15, 2004, after his 15-year battle with throat cancer. He was survived by his wife, his four children, his three brothers, and his sister.

== Philanthropy ==
Vartan's faith in the American legal process made him responsive to suggestions that Harrisburg needed a new law school. Approached by Widener University for help in 1986 because of his dual role as a developer and the then-largest individual contributor to Penn State University, he donated land, including his own home, and cash of nearly $2 million, and offered financial loans.

After the Harrisburg campus of Widener University School of Law opened in 1989, Vartan donated the surrounding land to the campus, including a home that he had built to replace his first home. After the establishment of the law school, Widener University added nursing and social work programs to the campus.

He was named to the PoliticsPA list of politically influential Pennsylvanians.

Vartan's generosity to Widener University led to renewed requests from Penn State. He then made donations for two Harrisburg buildings, one across from the state capitol, and the other one, a few blocks away. Vartan's educational philanthropy also included the funding of a Harrisburg public school program of after-school tutoring.
