= Alvin Simon =

Alvin Simon (1928-Feb 23, 2010 in Mount Washington, California) was an American restaurateur who played a leading role in the development and revitalization of Pasadena, California in the 1980s. His upscale Cafe Jacoulet became Old Pasadena's celebrity hangout. Later, he owned and operated the Cal-Asian restaurant Cinnabar in Glendale, California with chef Hisashi Yoshiara for 11 years.
