= Bon Yagi =

American restaurateur

Bon Yagi is a New York City based Japanese-American entrepreneur. He has created many successful Japanese-themed restaurants in the New York area. He is also a board member of the Gohan Society for Japanese cuisine. His success has been compared to that of David Chang.

He opened the Japanese sake bar Decibel in 1993. He opened Sakagura in 1997. He also found success with the soba restaurant Soba-Ya in the 1990s, and later ramen restaurant Rai Rai Ken. He opened Curry-Ya in 2007.
