= Damon Baehrel =

American restauranteur

Damon Baehrel (born 1961 or 1962 in Massapequa, Long Island), is a New York–based restaurateur. He is the owner of the restaurant that carries his name, Damon Baehrel, located in the hamlet of Earlton in Coxsackie, New York. Baehrel acts as the chef, the waiter, the grower, the forager, the gardener, the cheesemaker, the cured-meat maker.

== Restaurant ==
The restaurant is located in the basement of Damon and his wife's, Elizabeth Baehrel, home in the hamlet of Earlton in Coxsackie, New York. Originally it was known as Damon Baehrel at The Basement Bistro, which was established in 1989 initially providing catering services. The restaurant purports to acquire all its ingredients, such as pine flour, acorn oil and vinegars directly from the 12-acre property except salt and seafood, and meats are sourced from a neighboring organic livestock farm. The 16-seat restaurant as of February 2014 has a waiting list, in some reports, of 5 to 10 years.

== Criticisms ==
An August 2016 article in The New Yorker questioned many aspects of the restaurant's story, including whether the waiting list could actually be a decade or more long, and whether Baehrel is self-taught as a cook.

== Awards ==
Baehrel was nominated for the James Beard Foundation Award for "Best Chef Northeast", in 2013.
