= Tanya Holland =

American chef

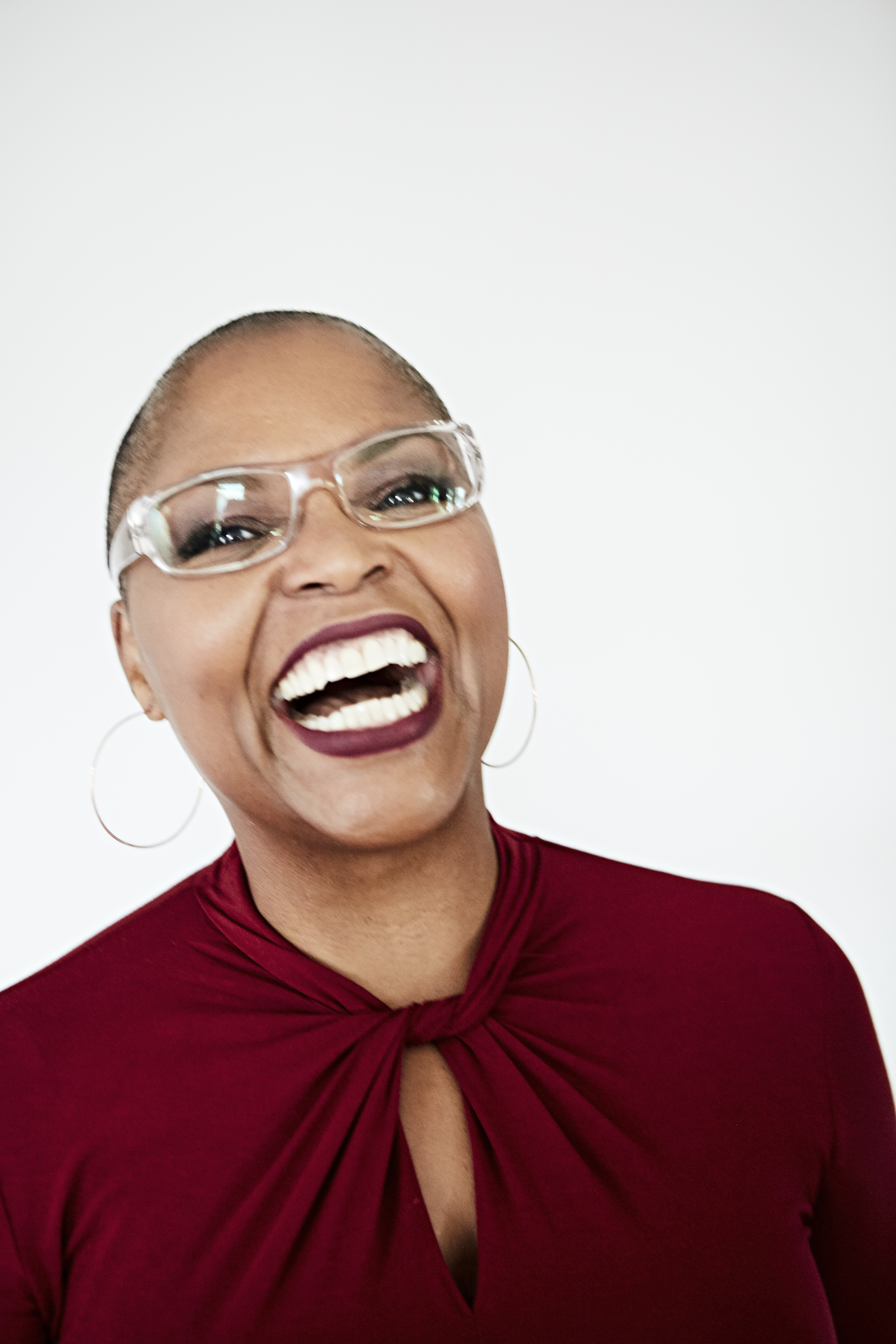
- Born: July 14, 1965 (age 61); Hartford, Connecticut, U.S.
- Education: University of Virginia, La Varenne Ecole de Cuisine
- Spouse: Phil Surkis (2007–2016)
- Culinary career
- Cooking style: New Soul
- Previous restaurants
- Brown Sugar Kitchen, Oakland, California (2008–2022); B-Side BBQ, Oakland, California (2011–2015), Brown Sugar Kitchen, San Francisco, California (2019–2020), Town Fare, Oakland, California (2021–2022)
- Website: tanyaholland.com

Tanya Holland (born July 14, 1965) is an American celebrity chef, restaurateur, podcast host, writer, and cookbook author. She is known as an expert of soul food. Holland is an alumna of Bravo TV's Top Chef, where she competed on the 15th season. She was the owner of Brown Sugar Kitchen in Oakland, California (2008 to 2022), which received national recognition and multiple Michelin Bib Gourmand awards.

Holland has authored 2 cookbooks, "New Soul Cooking" and "Brown Sugar Kitchen". Her 3rd cookbook "California Soul" was released on October 25, 2022. In 2020 she joined the James Beard Foundation Board of Trustees, is the Chair of James Beard Foundation Awards Committee (2021–present) and is a frequent writer and chef at the James Beard Foundation. She is an in-demand public speaker and lecturer who frequently leads the conversation on inclusion and equity in the hospitality industry. In 2020 she started Tanya’s Table Podcast and released 2 seasons.

== Early life and education ==
Holland was born on July 14, 1965, in Hartford, Connecticut, to parents Annette Holland and Hollis Holland. Her father attended Western New England College. The Holland family moved to Rochester, New York, when she was two years old, when her father took a job with Eastman Kodak. Holland’s parents influenced her interest in cooking: her father is from rural Virginia and her mother from Louisiana. When Holland was eight years old, her parents founded a gourmet cooking and eating club that consisted of six couples from different ethnic and professional backgrounds. They gathered to share experiences and meals that ranged from French, Mexican, Jewish, Indian, Pennsylvanian Dutch, Italian and Southern cuisine.

Holland graduated from Pittsford-Mendon High School in 1983. She attended the University of Virginia, where she graduated in 1987 with a BA degree in Russian Language and Literature. Holland attended La Varenne Ecole de Cuisine, a school founded by Anne Willan in Burgundy, France, where she received a Grand Diploma in 1992.

== Early career ==
She began her restaurant career in New York City as an assistant manager at Cornelia Street Café, Café Rakel, and Nosmo King restaurants. She went on to work as a catering office manager, an assistant sommelier for a wine importer, and a server at Mesa Grill before she committed to a career in the kitchen.

While in France, she trained with Michel Sarran at Le Mas Du Langoustier on the island of Porquerolles and with Jean-Michel Bouvier at Restaurant L’Essential in Chambéry.

== Chef career ==
Holland returned to Mesa Grill in 1994 to work as a line cook. While working as a line cook at Verbena, she supplemented her income as a food styling assistant to Roscoe Betsill whose work has been featured in Metropolitan Home, Vegetarian Times and Food and Wine magazines.

She spent two summers cooking on Martha’s Vineyard Island at The Oyster Bar and L’Etoile, interrupted by a winter at Hamersley's Bistro in Boston. She received positive reviews as the Executive Chef of The Delux Café in Boston and The Victory Kitchen in Brooklyn.

=== California ===
In 2002, she returned to the front of the house as Creative Director at Le Théâtre in Berkeley, California. Holland has lived in Oakland, California, since 2003. She opened her first restaurant, Brown Sugar Kitchen in West Oakland in 2008, receiving positive reviews for signature dishes such as chicken and waffles, oyster po’boys, and BBQ shrimp & grits. After 10 years in West Oakland, Brown Sugar Kitchen relocated to Downtown Oakland in 2019, before closing in 2022 during the COVID-19 pandemic.

Her barbecue restaurant, B-Side BBQ, was open from 2011 to 2015. She had started the plans to open a San Francisco Ferry Building location of Brown Sugar Kitchen in 2017, after much planning the restaurant was opened from 2020 to 2021. From 2001 until 2022, Holland owned and operated Town Fare, a cafe within the Oakland Museum of California (OMCA).

== Restaurants ==
- Brown Sugar Kitchen (2008–2019; moved), 2534 Mandela Parkway, Oakland, California
- Brown Sugar Kitchen (2019–2022), 2295 Broadway, Oakland, California
- B-Side BBQ (2011–2015), 3303 San Pablo Avenue, Oakland, California,
- Brown Sugar Kitchen (2019–2020), San Francisco Ferry Building, San Francisco, California,
- Town Fare (2021–2022), Oakland Museum of California, 1000 Oak Street, Oakland, California

== Writing and podcast career ==
She has contributed to Food and Wine and Signature Bride magazines. She has been featured in The New York Times, Wall Street Journal, Savoy magazine, Travel + Leisure, Sunset, Food and Wine,O Magazine, Ebony, Essence, and local publications. She has written for Wine Enthusiast and The Huffington Post.

In 2020, she released her debut Tanya's Table Podcast produced by MuddHouse Media. Guests on Season One of the podcast have included Samin Nosrat, Questlove, Alice Waters, and Jesse Tyler Ferguson. Season Two of Tanya’s Table”ran from December 2020 through March 2021 and featured special guests Ayesha Curry, Danny Glover, Bonnie Raitt, Phil Rosenthal, Lars Ulrich, Lizz Wright, Ericka Huggins, Jonny Moseley, and others.

== Teaching career ==
In 1998 she taught at the Cambridge Culinary Institute in Massachusetts and continues to share her knowledge at recreational cooking schools across the country such as Cooking by the Book, Ramekins, Draegers, Central Market, Whole Foods, and Andronico’s Market, and at Rancho La Puerto Resort and Spa in Tecate, Mexico. Holland is a member of the prestigious Chef’s Council for The Center For Culinary Development in San Francisco. Having been appointed as a Culinary Diplomat by the United States' Foreign Service Department for tours in Kazakhstan and Mexico, Holland also has taught classes in France for gastronomic travelers.

Holland serves as the Consulting Chef on Stanford University's Dining Hall concept, Red Skillet Kitchen, and Senior Advisor to Stanford Residential & Dining Enterprises.

== Television appearances ==
In 2017, Holland was a contestant on the 15th Season of Bravo TV's series Top Chef, an American reality show where she placed 9th out of 16. In 2020, Holland was the host of the OWN: Oprah Winfrey Network TV show "Tanya's Kitchen Table." The show aired from November 14 – December 26, 2020.

- MasterChef (Fox, 2021)
- Tanya's Kitchen Table (OWN, 2020)
- Selena + Chef (HBO Max, 2020; episode 8)
- Iron Chef (2017)
- Top Chef (season 15, 2017–2018)
- Home & Family (Hallmark, 2015–2017)
- CBS This Morning (2016)
- The Talk (CBS, (2013–2015 & 2020)
- The Chew (ABC, 2013)
- My Momma Throws Down (TV ONE, March 2012)
- Eye on the Bay & Check Please! Bay Area (PBS, 2008–2010)
- Soul Cities (VH1, 2009)
- G. Garvin's Road Tour (TV ONE, 2008)
- Byron Allen's Every Woman (2005)
- The Wayne Brady Show (ABC, 2004)
- The Jane Pauley Show (NBC, 2004)
- Sara Moulton's Cooking Live (Food Network, 2001)
- Emeril's Holiday Special & Ready Set Cook (Food Network, 2001)
- Melting Pot Soul Kitchen (Food Network, 2000–2003)
- Today Show (NBC, 2000)

== Honors and awards ==
Tanya has received numerous awards and accolades, including:

- “Bib Gourmand,” Michelin Guide (2010 and 2018)
- “Michelin Recommended,” Michelin Guide (2012)
- “Best Soul Food,” Oakland Magazine (2009 and 2010)
- “Best Southern/Soul Food,” East Bay Express (2009 and 2010)
- "Best New Barbecue in America" Food & Wine Magazine (2012)
- "Best New Barbecue in USA" Travel & Leisure Magazine (2013)
- "Woman Entrepreneur of the Year"' by Women's Initiative (2013)
- "2013 Restaurateur/Chef of the Year: recognizing an individual chef or restaurant that has created a dining establishment and experience that effectively marries the culinary arts with the tourism industry." The award was presented during the California Travel Summit on March 20, 2013, in San Diego.
- "Best Barbecue in America" by Ebony Magazine (July 2014)

The Oakland mayor Jean Quan and city council of Oakland passed a council resolution on June 5, 2012, declaring that day as "Tanya Holland Day” for her “Significant Role in Creating Community and Establishing Oakland as a Culinary Center”.

Holland was named "2013 Restaurateur/Chef of the Year" by the California Travel Association during the California Travel Summit in March 2013 in San Diego. Holland was elected co-president of the San Francisco chapter of Les Dames d’Escoffier in 2013. The Women's Initiative for Self-Employment named Holland Woman Entrepreneur of Year in October 2013. Holland was awarded The Key to the City of Oakland by Oakland Mayor Jean Quan on August 2, 2014.

== Bibliography ==
=== Books ===
- Holland, Tanya (2003). New Soul Cooking: Updating a Cuisine Rich in Flavor and Tradition. Harry N. Abrams. ISBN 9781584792895.
- Holland, Tanya (2014). Brown Sugar Kitchen: Recipes and Stories from Everyone's Favorite Soul Food Restaurant. Michael Chabon (forward). San Francisco, CA: Chronicle Books. ISBN 9781452122342.
- Holland, Tanya (2022). Tanya Holland's California Soul: Recipes from a Culinary Journey West. Maria C. Hunt (contributor), Kelley Fanto Deetz (contributor), Alice Walker (contributor). Clarkson Potter/Ten Speed. ISBN 9781984860736.

=== Contributions ===
Holland has contributed recipes or been featured in the following books:

- Why We Cook: Women on Food, Identity and Connection by Lindsay Gardner, 2021
- Impossible™: The Cookbook: How to Save Our Planet, One Delicious Meal at a Time, by Impossible Foods Inc., 2020, ISBN 978-1797203041.
- Food People are the Best People by Kristen Loken, 2020
- The Bay Area Homegrown Cookbook: Local Food, Local Restaurants, Local Recipes, by Aaron French, Elizabeth Tichenor, and Paul Bertolli, 2011, ISBN 978-0-7603-3810-0.
- In the Green Kitchen: Techniques to Learn by Heart, by Alice Waters, 2010, ISBN 978-0-307-33680-4.
- The Reach of A Chef: Professional Cooks in the Age of Celebrity, by Michael Ruhlman, 2007, ISBN 978-0-14-311207-5.
- Today’s Kitchen Cookbook, by Stephanie Karpinske, 2005, ISBN 0-696-22542-5.
