= Randolph Greenfield Adams =

American librarian and historian (1892–1951)

- Born: November 7, 1892; Philadelphia, Pennsylvania, U.S.
- Died: January 4, 1951 (aged 58); Ann Arbor, Michigan, U.S.
- Resting place: West Laurel Hill Cemetery, Bala Cynwyd, Pennsylvania, U.S.
- Occupations: Librarian, historian
- Spouse: Helen Newbold Spiller (m. 1917)
- Children: Thomas R. Adams, Richard Newbold Adams

Randolph Greenfield Adams (November 7, 1892 – January 4, 1951) was an American librarian and historian. He was the first director of the William L. Clements Library at the University of Michigan in Ann Arbor, Michigan, and served in that role for 28 years. He was a professor of history at the University of Michigan and focused on colonial America and the American Revolutionary War.

== Early life and education ==
Adams was born in Philadelphia, Pennsylvania, on November 7, 1892, to John Stokes Adams, and Heloise Root Adams.

Adams attended the Episcopal Academy and graduated from the University of Pennsylvania in 1914 as a member of Phi Beta Kappa. As an undergraduate, he was moderator of the Philomathean Society and oversaw the publication of A History of the Philomathean Society of the University of Pennsylvania (1913). He spent that summer in Europe and was in Berlin at the outbreak of World War I and returned home through Holland. He became an Graduate assistant at the University of Pennsylvania and the University of Chicago.

On June 7, 1917, he enlisted in the United States Army as a private. He was assigned to a base hospital in France with the University of Pennsylvania unit, and was commissioned as a second lieutenant in the Quartermaster Corps. He was honorably discharged on May 5, 1919.

He became a Carnegie Fellow in international law at the University of Pennsylvania and earned his Ph.D. in history in 1920. His doctoral dissertation, Political Ideas of the American Revolution, was published in 1922. He was a mentor to Howard Henry Peckham who helped him organize the library and who later became a historian of American colonial times and the American Revolutionary War.

He was awarded an honorary doctorate of laws degree from Albion College in 1938.

== Career ==
In 1920, he accepted a job as assistant professor of history at Trinity College (now known as Duke University), and worked there for three years. At the recommendation of librarian George Parker Winship, head of the Widener Library at Harvard University, Adams was interviewed by William L. Clements for the post of the director of the new library he was founding, the William L. Clements Library, a rare book and manuscript repository at the University of Michigan. Though he had no background or training as a librarian, his extensive historical knowledge and scholarship was coupled with a background in rare books, sparked in childhood by the collector A. Edward Newton, a friend of John Stokes Adams.

In 1923, Adams was appointed as the first director of the Clements Library and professor of history at the University of Michigan, positions he held until his death in 1951. Initially, the Library consisted of the personal collection of Clements, thousands of rare books, newspapers, maps, and manuscripts, including the papers of General Thomas Gage, Sir Henry Clinton, Lord George Germain, William Petty, Lord Shelburne, and Nathanial Greene. Adams expanded the holdings of the library with significant acquisitions like the 1663 Eliot Indian Bible and The Valley of the Mississippi Illustrated by John Caspar Wild and Lewis Foulk Thomas. During Adams' tenure, the Clements Library transformed from a private collection to a research institution of international renown.

Adams' views often ran contrary to trends developing in the library profession. While librarians promoted expanded access for patrons to materials, he turned away people seeking access to the Clements Library holdings if he judged their needs inadequate. In his controversial 1937 Library Quarterly essay, Librarians as Enemies of Books, he complained about librarians de-emphasizing books and scholarship in favor of other responsibilities.

Adams' published scholarship includes A History of the Foreign Policy of the United States (1924), Gateway to American History (1927) and Pilgrims, Indians and Patriots (1928), and Three Americanists: Henry Harrisse, Bibliographer; George Brinley, Book Collector; Thomas Jefferson, Librarian (1939). He edited Selected Political Essays of James Wilson (1930) and contributed numerous entries to the Dictionary of American Biography and the Dictionary of American History, and served as editor of The Colophon and Quarto, the latter a publication of the Clements Library.

He was Rosenbach Fellow in Bibliography at the University of Pennsylvania. In 1929, he was a visiting professor at the University of St Andrews in Scotland.

He was active in the American Antiquarian Society, the American Historical Association, and the Grolier Club. He was a member of the Bibliographical Society of America and served as president in 1940.

He died on January 4, 1951, of heart disease in Ann Arbor, Michigan, and was interred at West Laurel Hill Cemetery in Bala Cynwyd, Pennsylvania.

== Publications ==
- A History of the Philomathian Society of the University of Pennsylvania, University of Pennsylvania, Philomathian Society, 1913
- Political Ideas of The American Revolution, Durham, N.C.: Trinity College Press, 1922
- A History of the Foreign Policy of the United States, New York: The Macmillan Company, 1924
- The Whys and Wherefores of the William L. Clements Library, Ann Arbor: University of Michigan, 1925
- Early American Printing, Ann Arbor, Michigan: University of Michigan, 1927
- Librarians as Enemies of Books, The Library Quarterly, Vol. III, No. 3, July 1937
