= Henry Salgado =

- Born: Tampa, Florida
- Education: Florida Culinary Institute
- Spouse: Michele Salgado
- Culinary career
- Cooking style: Modern Spanish
- Current restaurant(s): Spanish River Grill
- Previous restaurant(s): Hotel La Valencia; Max's Grill; Horseradish Grill
- Website: thespanishrivergrill.com

Henry Salgado is the executive chef/owner of Spanish River Grill& Wine Bar in [New Smyrna Beach Florida and a Two Time James Beard semi finalist nominee for best chef south ].

== Career ==
Henry Salgado was born in Tampa, Florida. Salgado began his restaurant career as a busboy and later became a corporate trainer for a national chain restaurant. He was educated at the Florida Culinary Institute in West Palm Beach, Florida. Salgado worked at Max's Grill in Boca Raton, Florida, Hotel La Valencia in San Diego, California and at the Horseradish Grill in Atlanta, Georgia before he and his wife opened the Spanish River Grill in New Smyrna Beach, Florida in 1999. The Spanish River Grill specializes in modern Spanish cuisine, influenced by Salgado's [Spanish] heritage.

ISalgado was a semi finalist for the Best Chef South for James Beard Award in 2012 and 2014 James Beard Award.
