= James Koskiniemi =

American chef (born 1977)

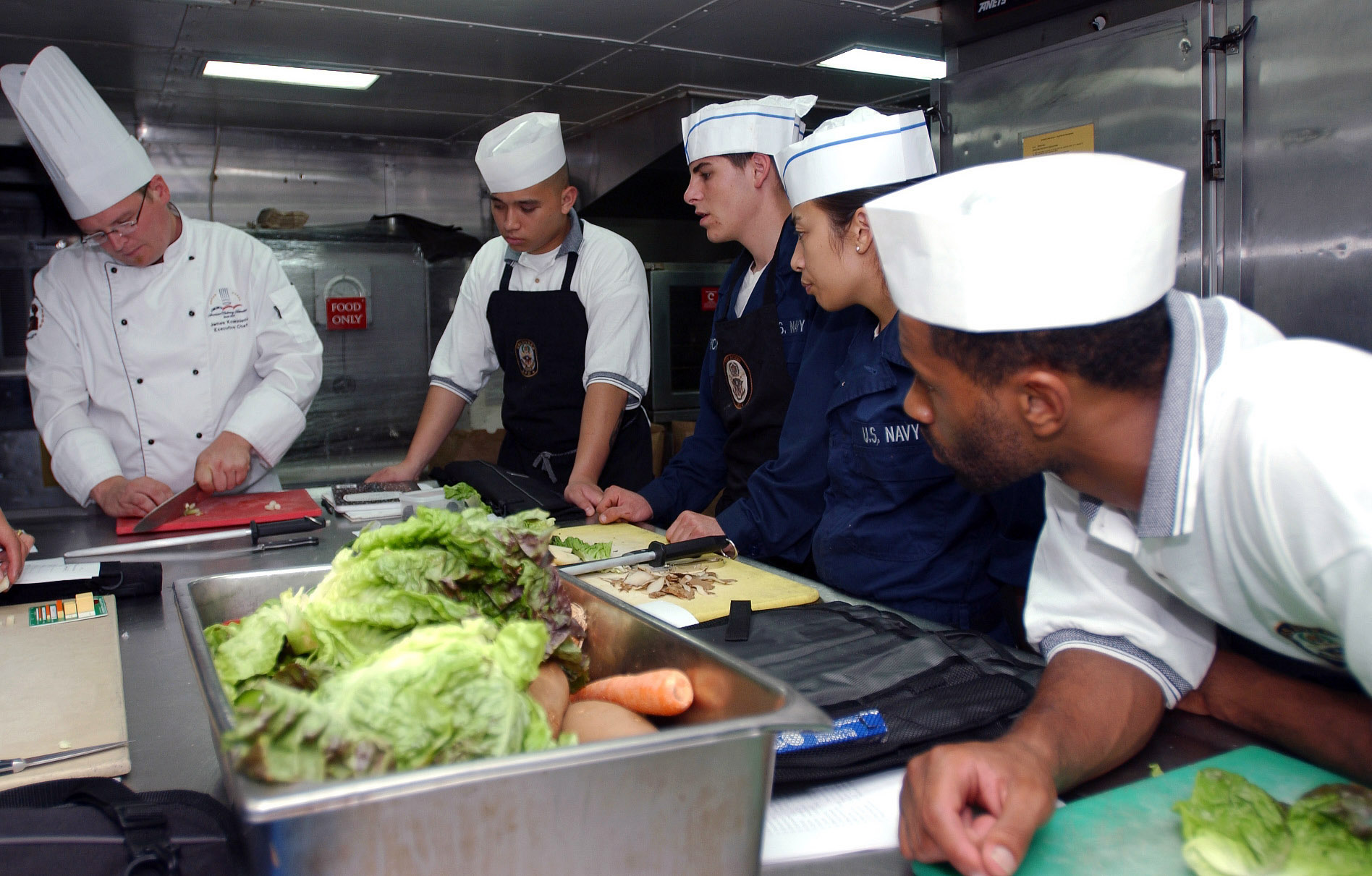
- Born: February 16, 1977 (age 49); Portland, Oregon
- Education: California Culinary Academy, San Francisco 2005 Alumni
- Culinary career
- Cooking style: French Californian
- Current restaurant(s): ChefJamesSF.com (San Francisco, California)

James Koskiniemi (born February 16, 1977) is an American chef and food writer. He was the Executive Chef of The Bellevue Club and was President of the Board of Directors of the American Culinary Federation.
