= Michael J. O'Malley =

American taekwondo practitioner

Michael J. O'Malley (born in Boston, Massachusetts) is an American Taekwondo athlete and instructor.

O'Malley competed in Taekwondo from 1976 through 1982. He was chosen for the USA Taekwondo teams from 1978 through 1982. He was elected US Team Captain in 1980 and US Team Coach in 1984.

O'Malley was inducted into the Tae Kwon Do Hall of Fame in 2011.

O'Malley set up the M.J. O'Malley Tae Kwon Do Center in Peabody, MA in early 2011.

== Achievements and awards ==
- 1976 - First Place, General Choi's (Choi Hong Hi) Cup International Championship
- 1976 - Grand Champion, National Open Karate Championships Darien, Connecticut
- 1978 - Gold Medal (Welterweight), U.S. Team Trials, Washington D.C.
- 1978 - Member / AAU "All American Men's Tae Kwon Do Team"
- 1978 - U.S. Team Member Pre-World games Seoul, Korea
- 1978 - Bronze Medal, Pan American Games, Mexico City
- 1979 - Member / AAU "All American Men's Tae Kwon Do Team"
- 1979 - Grand Champion, "Tiger Kim's" International Open Championship MSG, New York
- 1979 - Gold Medal (Welterweight), U.S. Team Trials, Dayton, Ohio
- 1979 - Selected "Male Competitor of the Year", U.S. Team Trials.
- 1979 - U.S. Team Member, World Taekwondo Championships, Stuttgart
- 1979 - Silver Medal, U.S. Team Member, North American Games, Honolulu, Hawaii
- 1979 - U.S. Team Member, World Taekwondo Championships, Taipei, Taiwan
- 1980 - Gold Medal (Welterweight), U.S. Team Trials Berkeley, California
- 1980 - Recipient of the "Ken Min Leadership Award" Berkeley, California
- 1980 - Elected U.S. Team Captain
- 1980 - Gold Medal (Welterweight), U.S. Team Member, Pan American Games Houston, Texas
- 1981 - Gold Medal (Welterweight), U.S. Team Member, North America Games Toronto, Canada
- 1981 - Gold Medal (Welterweight), U.S. Team Trials Tampa, Florida
- 1981 - Grand Champion, National Tae Kwon Do Championship Washington D.C.
- 1981 - Elected U.S. Team Captain for World Taekwondo Championships in Guayaquil
- 1982 - U.S. Team Member, World Taekwondo Championships, Guayaquil
- 1983 - U.S. Team Member, World Taekwondo Championships, Copenhagen
- 1984 - Elected U.S. Team coach of the East Squad for U.S. Olympic Festival Houston, Texas
- 1985 - Former Athlete Representative to the United States Olympic Committee
- 2009 - Received Taekwondo Lifetime Achievement Award
- 2011 - Inducted into Tae Kwon Do Hall of Fame
- 2011 - Founded O'Malley Tae Kwon Do Center in Peabody, Massachusetts
