= Locke-Ober =

- Locke-Ober Restaurant
- U.S. National Register of Historic Places
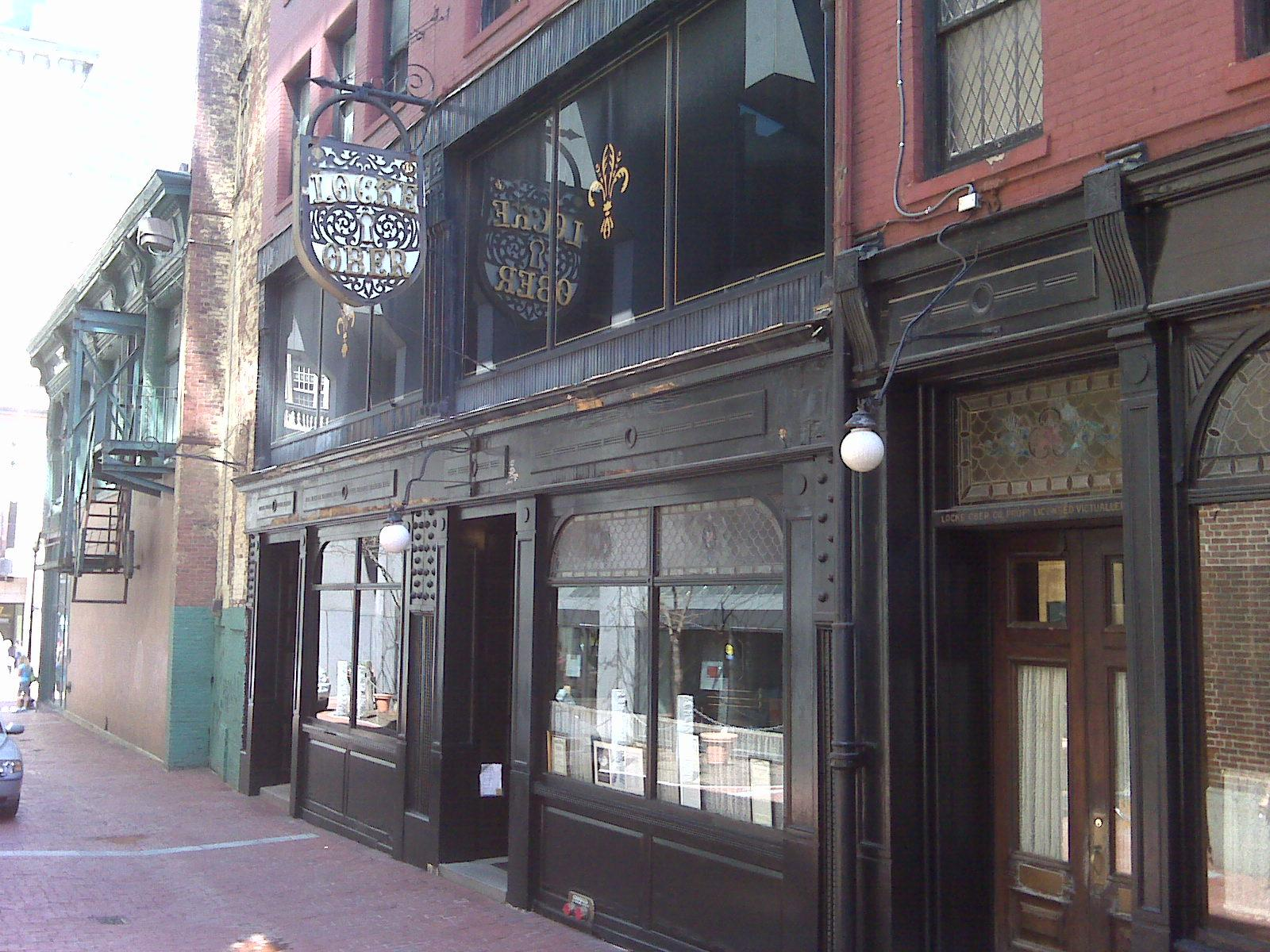
- Locke-Ober in 2009
- Location: 2 Winter Place, Boston, Massachusetts
- Coordinates: 42°21′19.74″N 71°3′41.41″W
- Built: 1832; 194 years ago
- Architectural style: Greek Revival
- NRHP reference No.: 86001911
- Added to NRHP: July 24, 1986

Locke-Ober was a longstanding fine dining restaurant in Boston that operated between circa 1875 and 2012. Claimed to be the city's fourth-oldest restaurant (after the Union Oyster House (1826), Durgin-Park (1874), and the Jacob Wirth Restaurant (1868)), it featured classical French cuisine and seafood.

== History ==
The Greek Revival building where Locke-Ober operated was constructed in 1832. By 1862, the Boston City Directory listed Adrien Destre as operating a restaurant at 2 Winter Place. By 1868, F.A. Blanc was listed as running the restaurant. By 1879, Boston city records listed Luis Ober as the proprietor of a restaurant at a location of "over twenty years' standing". From the start, the restaurant specialized in French food and was central to the financial, political, and intellectual history of Boston.

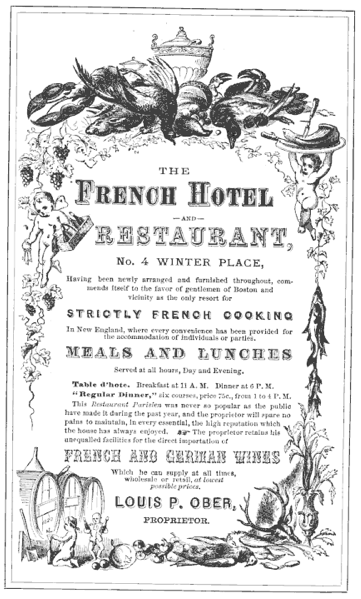
Advertisement for "the French Hotel and Restaurant," 2 Winter Place, Louis P. Ober, proprietor, 1871

Louis Ober was born in 1837 in the French department of Alsace. At age fourteen, he moved to New York, working as a barber, book seller, and importing and exporting goods between the United States and France. Ober lived and worked in New Jersey, Cincinnati, and Philadelphia before settling in Boston. He was employed at the restaurant, which was then owned and operated by Blanc. While in Blanc's employ, Ober became familiar with French food, fine wine, and furnishings. By 1875, Ober had acquired ownership and applied to the city for expansion of the restaurant to 3-4 Winter Place. Financing was provided by Eben Jordan, a co-founder of the Jordan Marsh Company. The restaurant reopened as Ober's Restaurant Parisien.

Over the next 20 years, the restaurant was expanded. It became furnished with increasingly luxurious imported materials typical of the Gilded Age, including Honduran mahogany, French furniture, Italian and French sculpture and paintings, English silver, and Bohemian crystal lighting. Until 1967, the restaurant was open to males only.

By the late twentieth century, Locke-Ober – though still possessing most of its original grand trappings – had lost much of its popularity. Boston restaurateur Lydia Shire, with investor Paul Licari, leased the space in 2001 and began a painstaking restoration of the main and private dining rooms on the third floor, adding two more contemporary rooms. Jacky Robert was executive chef until 2003. Nonetheless, the restaurant closed in 2012, with reports that the owners planned to sell the building.

The building was added to the National Register of Historic Places in 1986. The location is now occupied by Yvonne's, described by the Boston Globe as a "modern-day Locke-Ober".

== Cultural references ==
The fictional character I.M. Fletcher has lunch at Locke-Ober with newspaper editor Jack Saunders in the 1976 novel Confess, Fletch by Gregory McDonald. The restaurant was the setting of the opening scene in Robert B. Parker's 1980 Spenser novel Looking for Rachel Wallace. It was also the setting of the denouement of Death in a Tenured Position (also published as A Death in the Faculty) by Amanda Cross published in 1981. It was also the restaurant that Professor Lambeau took Robin Williams' character, Sean, to in an attempt to convince him to work with the main protagonist in Good Will Hunting in 1997. In 1982's The Verdict starring Paul Newman, James Mason's character announces "we'll be at Locke-Ober's" in the scene where his law firm is prepping for its case. Locke-Ober is also mentioned as the site of a senior doctor character's desired celebratory meal in episode 21 of the first season of St. Elsewhere. It is also the restaurant where young Paul Christopher is invited to join "The Outfit" (clearly the CIA) in Charles McCarry's "The Last Supper."

== See also ==
- List of French restaurants
- National Register of Historic Places listings in northern Boston, Massachusetts
