= Sean Meenan =

American entrepreneur from New York

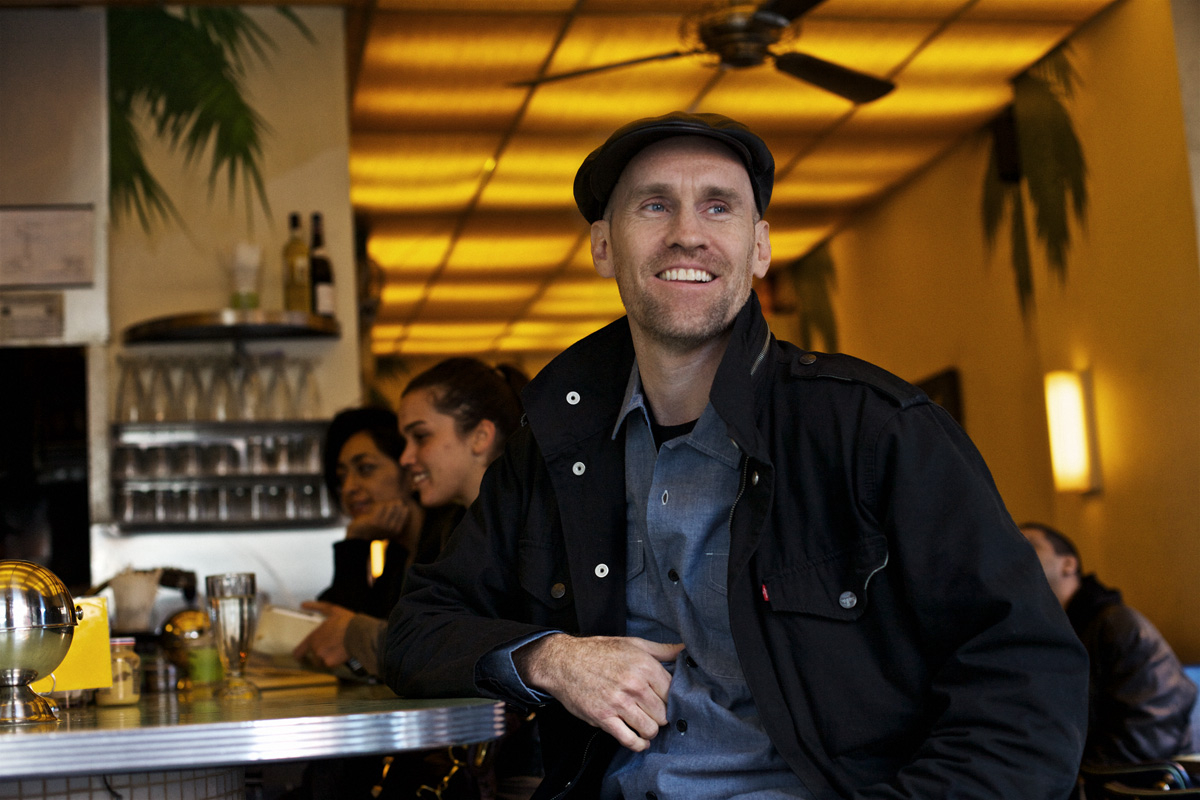
- Occupations: Entrepreneur; Restaurateur
- Known for: Eco-friendly Restaurants; Original Etsy Investor
- Website: http://seanmeenan.com/

Sean Meenan is an American entrepreneur from New York. He conceived and owns Cafe Habana in the Nolita section of Manhattan, Habana Outpost in Fort Greene, Brooklyn, Habana Outpost in the French Quarter of New Orleans, Cafe Habana Malibu in Malibu, California and Cafe Habana Dubai in Dubai, UAE. He is the initial investor in Etsy as well as the initial investor in The Elder Statesman (brand).

== Biography ==
Meenan is a fifth-generation New Yorker and a former amateur boxing champion. He had always worked in either film or restaurants before opening his own. Meenan was co-owner of the restaurant Rialto prior to opening up numerous "Habana" restaurants. In 1997 he opened Café Habana in NoLita, and followed up with Habana To Go in 1998. Meenan opened New York's first solar powered restaurant, Habana Outpost, in Fort Greene, Brooklyn in 2005. Meenan opened two additional "Habana" restaurants in 2010 (Café Habana Malibu) and 2013 (Café Habana Dubai).

In addition to being a restaurateur, Meenan is also an investor in other industries. He is credited as the original investor in Etsy, with the idea for the website originating from a collaboration at his restaurant Habana Outpost. Meenan is also an investor in the cashmere clothing company The Elder Statesman.

== Environmental focus ==
Meenan's restaurants are environmentally conscious, community-driven restaurants known for educating the public about sustainability. His restaurant Habana Outpost is New York's first solar-powered restaurant and marketplace, employing such eco-friendly elements as a human-powered blender, rainwater harvesting to flush toilets, furniture made of recycled materials, and fully compostable utensils (plates and cups made of potatoes, sugarcane and corn).

== Non-profits ==
Meenan has founded a 501(c)(3) called Habana Works, a grassroots community organization working toward strengthening, educating and beautifying Brooklyn. Through hands-on programming that spans green architecture, design, community gardens and children’s programs—all celebrating sustainable living—Habana Works provides environmental education and urban study to Brooklyn residents.
