= Andrea Apuzzo =

American chef

- Born: Isle of Capri, Italy
- Culinary career
- Current restaurant: Andrea's

Andrea Apuzzo is an Italian-American chef. His restaurant, Andrea's, in Metairie, Louisiana, United States, is one of the New Orleans area's noted restaurants.

Apuzzo was born and raised in Italy, on the Isle of Capri, but has traveled and cooked in Europe, the Caribbean, and the United States. He has published two cookbooks, La Cucina di Andrea's and Andrea's Light Cookbook, and received the Wine Spectator Award of Excellence and the DiRoNA Excellence Award, among others.

== Biography ==
Apuzzo began his formal culinary education while working in a bakery in his home town of Anacapri. At fourteen, he left Capri to travel to Germany, Switzerland, England and South America to further his culinary training in Europe and abroad.

After working 35 years in kitchens all over the world, Apuzzo moved to Bermuda in 1973 to work at the Southampton Princess Hotel and later the Hamilton Princess Hotel. In 1975, he came to the United States as Executive Sous-Chef of the Omni International Hotel in Atlanta, Georgia. In 1977, he moved to New Orleans as Executive Chef of the Royal Orleans Hotel, a position he held until January 1985 when he left to open Andrea's.

Apuzzo belongs to organizations such as The Confrerie de la Chaine des Rotisseurs, International Wine & Food Society, Vatel Club, Les Toque Blanches, GRI (Gruppo Ristoranti Italiani), the James Beard Foundation and the Certified Executive Chef Association. Apuzzo has received the Wine Spectator of Excellence Award and the Distinguished Restaurants of North America (DiRona) Excellence Awards.

== Works ==
In 1990, Apuzzo published his first cookbook, La Cucina di Andrea's, which contains over 300 recipes. In 1994, Apuzzo published his second book, Andrea's Light Cookbook, which contains recipes for low fat, low cholesterol and low calorie dishes that are approved by the American Heart Association and the American Diabetes Association.
