= Gordon Hamersley =

American chef based in Boston

Gordon Hamersley is an American chef and cookbook author based in Boston. Roast chicken is a favorite and preferred recipe, as it was part of a meal he prepared for Julia Child on her show In Julia's Kitchen with Master Chefs. His trademark is an ever-present Red Sox cap.

His book Bistro Cooking At Home, which he wrote with Joanne McAllister Smart, won the International Association of Culinary Professionals won the 2004 Cookbook Award in the Chefs and Restaurants Category.

== Biography ==
In the 1970s he enrolled in Boston University (CGS’71, SED’74) where he trained at some French restaurants within the Boston area. By 1979 he had moved to Los Angeles, where he worked in Ma Maison under the supervision of chef Wolfgang Puck. In 1982, he moved with his wife Fiona to Nice, France where they shopped and ate French food. A year later he came back to Boston and got a job with Lydia Shire at Boston's Copley Plaza Hotel. Four years later, he and his wife Fiona opened Hamersley's Bistro on Tremont Street where they served French cuisine.

When asked "Who has been your biggest culinary inspiration?", he responded:

Probably the chef I was most influenced by as a young cook, the one who cooked closest to how I cook today, was Claude Segal who was at Ma Maison after Wolfgang Puck. Unfortunately Claude died a few years ago, but he was the one who first showed me how fulfilling simple French country cooking was to cook and eat. He was a master at simplicity and presented his food with a natural elegance. Wolfgang introduced me to the rigors of cooking for a super demanding crowd. ... Lydia (Shire) was a gas to work with .... I loved Andre Soltner, who owned Lutece in New York. Soltner taught me that my true role as an owner and chef is to be in the restaurant’s kitchen night in and night out. But I guess Julia (Child]) was the one who taught me the most. She told me to ‘Stay true to my instincts and don’t be affected by trends for trends sake.’ In the early days (of Hamersley’s Bistro), she used to call me at home the morning after eating at my restaurant with a list of things she felt should be better. There’s nothing quite as motivating as being criticized by Julia Child at seven in the morning. Yikes!

Hamersley's Bistro closed in the end of October 2014.

In January 2015, Hamersley began writing a food column for The Boston Globe.

In its Spring 2014 issue, the quarterly Upland Almanac introduced Hamersley as its "Upland Kitchen" columnist.

== Honors and awards ==
Hammersley's Bistro became very popular among eaters and received positive reviews while Food & Wine magazine called the owner one of the "Ten Best New Chefs for 1988". From 1988 to 1993 he was nominated for the James Beard Award and received it only by 1995. A year later, his restaurant got a "Hall of Fame" award from Boston magazine and from 1988 to 1995 was ranked as the Best of Boston. In 1997, The Boston Globe gave his bistro a four-star rating. Currently he is a member of the New England Culinary Institute board of advisors.
