= Clyde Serda =

American chef and writer (born 1952)

- Born: May 9, 1952 (age 74); San Francisco, California
- Education: California Culinary Academy, San Francisco 1990 Alumni
- Culinary career
- Cooking style: San Francisco cuisine
- Current restaurant(s): World Trade Club (San Francisco, CA)
- Television show(s): In the World Kitchen, PBS Cooking Series

Chef Clyde Serda (born July 3, 1952) is an American chef and writer.
