= Jasper White (chef) =

American chef, restaurateur and author (1954–2024)

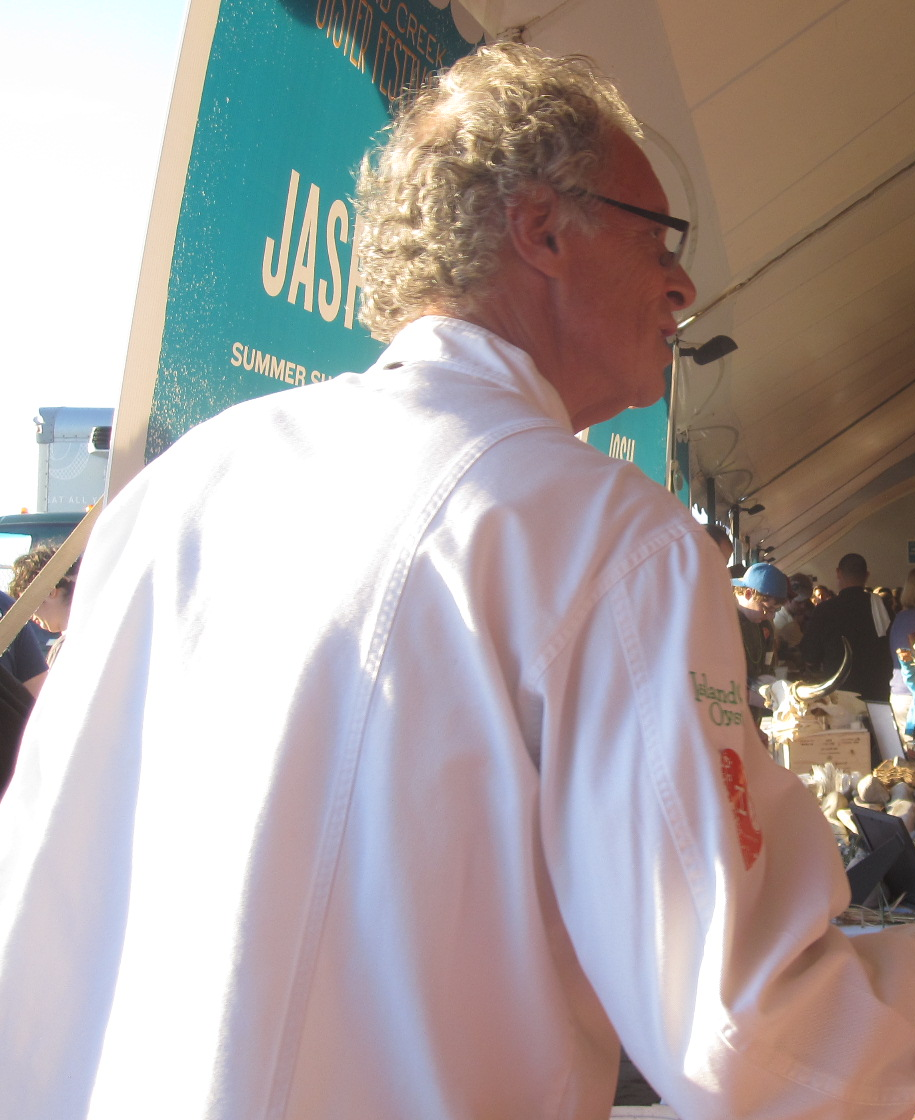
- Jasper White in 2011
- Born: May 28, 1954; Orange, New Jersey, U.S.
- Died: May 11, 2024 (aged 69); Boston, Massachusetts, U.S.
- Education: Culinary Institute of America
- Spouse: Kathleen
- Culinary career
- Cooking style: "New England food"
- Current restaurants: Jasper's (closed); Jasper White's Summer Shack
- Awards won: James Beard Foundation Award

Jasper Kenneth White Jr. (May 28, 1954 – May 11, 2024) was an American chef, restaurateur and cookbook author. He was considered a leading authority on the cuisine and food industry of New England, with a particular focus on seafood.

== Early life and education ==
Jasper White was born in Orange, New Jersey on May 28, 1954. He credited his Italian grandmother with his interest in food.

White enrolled at The Culinary Institute of America in June 1975 and graduated in 1976. In 1979, he met Lydia Shire, another aspiring chef. They worked together at many of the respected hotel dining rooms in Boston such as The Copley Plaza, The Parker House, and The Bostonian Hotel. Shire considers White to be her mentor, and "her best cook friend in the world."

== Restaurants ==
In 1983, he opened Jasper's, a restaurant on Boston's waterfront. Here, he "carved out a niche in the local food scene deconstructing classics on his haute cuisine menu." It was described as "a Boston, MA landmark famous for seafood and other New England specialties ... (leading) people who thought he was inextricably linked with upscale cuisine." Jasper's closed in 1995; White closed the restaurant so he could spend time with his children. For three years afterwards, he was a consultant to Legal Seafoods.

White opened Jasper White's Summer Shack in May 2000 in the Alewife section of Cambridge. The restaurant also has locations at Mohegan Sun and in Boston's Back Bay. There is a seasonal location on Spectacle Island in the Boston Harbor. The Summer Shack allowed him to "return to his culinary true love of hearty family-style cuisine: authentic and flavorful–not fussy (and) embrace his unpretentious roots." Even though it is meant to be like a seaside clam shack, one gourmet dish from Jasper's is on the menu, and it is the one for which he is most famous – pan-roasted lobster. Summer Shack was sold to the Lyons Group in 2017 and White was no longer involved in the business.

== Personal life and death ==
White and his wife, Nancy, were married for 28 years and raised his 3 Children, Mariel, Jasper, and Hayley. He later remarried, Kathleen, who had 3 children of her own. He died at a hospital in Boston from a ruptured intracranial aneurysm on May 11, 2024, at age 69.

== Cookbooks ==
- Jasper White's Cooking from New England (1989)
- Lobster at Home (1998)
- Fifty Chowders (2000)
- The Summer Shack Cookbook: The Complete Guide to Shore Food (2007)

== Awards and honors ==
- James Beard Foundation Award for Best Chef: Northeast.
- In 2000, the James Beard Foundation nominated The Summer Shack for Best New Restaurant.
