= Lydia Shire =

American chef and restaurateur

- Born: 1948 (age 77–78); Connecticut
- Education: Le Cordon Bleu
- Occupations: restaurateur, chef
- Spouse(s): Uriel Pineda (current husband); Tom Shire (ex-husband)
- Children: 4

Lydia Shire (born 1948) is an American Boston-based chef and restaurateur.

== Early life and education ==
Born in Connecticut and raised in Brookline, Massachusetts, both of her parents were illustrators. Shire began cooking as early as age four alongside her father. In 1971, she enrolled at Le Cordon Bleu in London. She considers Jasper White to be her mentor, and "her best cook friend in the world."

== Career ==
When she returned from London, she became a line cook at Jacky Robert's Maison Robert. Within three years, she became head chef in 1974.

Shire went to work at Seasons in The Bostonian Hotel in 1982 which led to national recognition and a James Beard Foundation "awarded (her) the coveted "Who’s Who of Food & Beverage" award in 1984." It was here that she first met Jasper White. She worked under him as Executive Sous Chef and left, in 1985, as the Executive Chef - the Bostonian's first female chef.

In 1986, Shire went to Beverly Hills to open the Four Seasons hotel becoming the "first female Executive Chef in the Four Seasons Hotels & Resorts Company to open a luxury property."

She returned to Boston and in 1989 Biba "opened to great fanfare." Biba closed after 9/11 and reopened as Excelsior Restaurant and Shire was hired as Executive Chef.

In 1994, she opened Pignoli in the Copley Plaza.

When Shire bought Locke-Ober with business partner Paul Licari in 2001, she became the historic restaurant's first female chef. Jacky Robert was executive chef for two years beginning in 2001. A ten-year lease was signed which they were unable to renew, forcing them to close. Shire was devastated, saying "They were for me 10 absolutely glorious years. Gourmet ranked us the 18th-best restaurant in the country, and named us to the 21 must-visit restaurants in your lifetime."

Since then, she has opened Blue Sky at the Atlantic House Hotel in York Beach, Maine (closed in 2012), and Scampo in Boston's Liberty Hotel – formerly the Charles Street Jail.

== Honors and awards ==
- 1984 the James Beard Foundation "awarded (her) the coveted "Who’s Who of Food & Beverage" award."
- 1992, James Beard Foundation Award as "America’s Best Chef – Northeast."
- 1992 Food & Wine named Shire "One of America’s Top Ten Chefs."
- 1994 Shire "earned the prestigious Ivy Award by Restaurants & Institutions magazine"
- 1996 The James Beard Foundation nominated her as "One of America’s Top Five Chefs"
- 2013 Restaurant News inducted her into their Fine Dining Hall of Fame.

== Personal life ==
Shire is married to former employee Uriel Pineda, and currently lives in Stoneham, Massachusetts. She has three children with former husband Tom Shire, and a fourth child, Alex, with current husband Uriel Pineda. After cooking in restaurants in Spain, California and other locales, Alex Pineda worked as a chef with his mother at Scampo in Boston and in spring 2021, became the executive chef at The Landing, a seafood restaurant in Marblehead, Massachusetts. He later competed on an Alton Brown-led tournament on Food Network's Chopped, winning his preliminary episode before subsequently being the first chef eliminated in the tournament finale episode.
