= Des Plaines Mall =

- Coordinates: 42.040074982202356°N 87.88764785787377°W
- Address: 700 Pearson Street
- Opened: October 6, 1977
- Closed: October 31, 1996
- Developer: J.R. Gottlieb & Co.
- Manager: Richard Pace & Associates (1977-1986), David Friedman and William Fallmer (1986-?)
- Architect: Erickson and Stevens, Inc.
- Num. of anchor tenants: 1 (Spiegler's)
- Floor area: 185,000 square feet
- Floors: 3
- Parking: yes

The Des Plaines Mall was a 185,000 square foot (17,200 m^{2}) (Note: Various sources list 114,000, 140,000, 100,000 and 95,000) shopping mall in downtown Des Plaines, Illinois. It was designed by J.R. Gottlieb & Co. The architect was Erickson and Stevens, Inc. Construction began June 1, 1976. It opened October 6, 1977.

Planning for the mall began in 1972, with the Des Plaines Mall Corporation formed in 1973. The mall opened October 6, 1977. Its original tennants included Spiegler's, Radio Shack, Hallmark Cards and the Oui Boutique. It was built for about $12 million. Shoppers and employees parked at the nearby Behrel Parking Deck. The intent was to demolish buildings between the mall and the deck, most notably the abandoned Spiegler's store, and build a walkway between the two locations.

In 1979 the mall added an area on the lower level called Olde Center Street, a turn-of-the-century theme arcade.

In 1995 the city took control of the mall with the intent of condemning it.

Its last day of business was October 31, 1996. Demolition began in June 1998.

== Spiegler's Department Store ==
Spieglers (Note: 'Department Store' and the apostrophe were eventually dropped.) occupied 23,000 square feet of the mall. It was founded in 1900 at 1467 Ellinwood.

With the mall in decline, the store closed June 28, 1992.

== Herbert H. Behrel Parking Plaza ==
The plaza was a 300-car parking deck on Ellinwood Street. The four story cement garage was blamed for the failure of the mall.

== Notable events ==
- Soap stars Richard Shoberg and Michael Storm appeared at the mall on November 8, 1980.
- The Des Plaines Public Library held two book sales in the mall in 1996.
