= Henry Hardenbergh =

Henry Hardenbergh may refer to:

- Henry Janeway Hardenbergh (1847–1918), American architect
- Henry M. Hardenbergh (1843–1865), recipient of the Medal of Honor
