= George Berz =

American politician from Illinois

Coroner of Cook County
- In office 1896–1900
- Preceded by: James McHale
- Succeeded by: John E. Traeger

Personal details
- Born: March 17, 1844 German Confederation
- Died: February 28, 1920 (aged 75) Chicago, Illinois, United States
- Party: Republican

Military service
- Allegiance: United States of America
- Branch/service: Union Army
- Years of service: 1861–1862
- Rank: Sergeant
- Unit: 1st Kentucky Infantry Regiment
- Battles/wars: American Civil War

George Berz (March 17, 1844 – February 28, 1920) was a German-American businessman and Republican politician in Chicago.

== Biography ==
Berz was born in Germany in 1844 and immigrated with his family to Louisville, Kentucky when he was a child. He enlisted in the Union Army in the American Civil War and was wounded at the Battle of Shiloh in 1862. Following his discharge, he went to Chicago and thereafter operated a hotel on the West Side. A Republican, Berz was appointed Postmaster of the West Division post office by President Benjamin Harrison, an office he held until his appointment as Deputy Sheriff of Cook County. He was elected Coroner of Cook County in 1896 and held office until 1900. He died in 1920 in Chicago.
