= Dante de Magistris =

American chef and restaurateur

Dante de Magistris is an American chef and restaurateur raised in Belmont, Massachusetts. His first restaurant, dante was at the Royal Sonesta Hotel in East Cambridge, Cambridge, Massachusetts. The restaurant was named 2011 Best Italian Restaurant, Upscale by Boston Magazine.

He has appeared on The Early Show's Chef on a Shoestring segment.

== Biography ==
In his early twenties, de Magistris went to Italy for a year, working in Florence and Bologna. He was sous chef at Ristorante Don Alfonso, a Michelin two star restaurant in Sant'Agata sui Due Golfi. When he returned to Boston, he worked with or for Lydia Shire, Michael Schlow, Susan Regis and Michela Larson.

== Restaurants ==
dante was opened with brothers Filippo and Damian. Bon Appétit, in 2006, named it one of the Hot 10 Restaurants of the year. It closed in 2020.

Current restaurants include Il Casale. The Belmont location opened in 2009 and in 2014, he opened a location in Lexington, Massachusetts. He and his brothers opened The Wellington in 2018 which like Il Casale, is in Belmont Center.
