= Ernst Schmidt (politician) =

American physician (1830–1900)

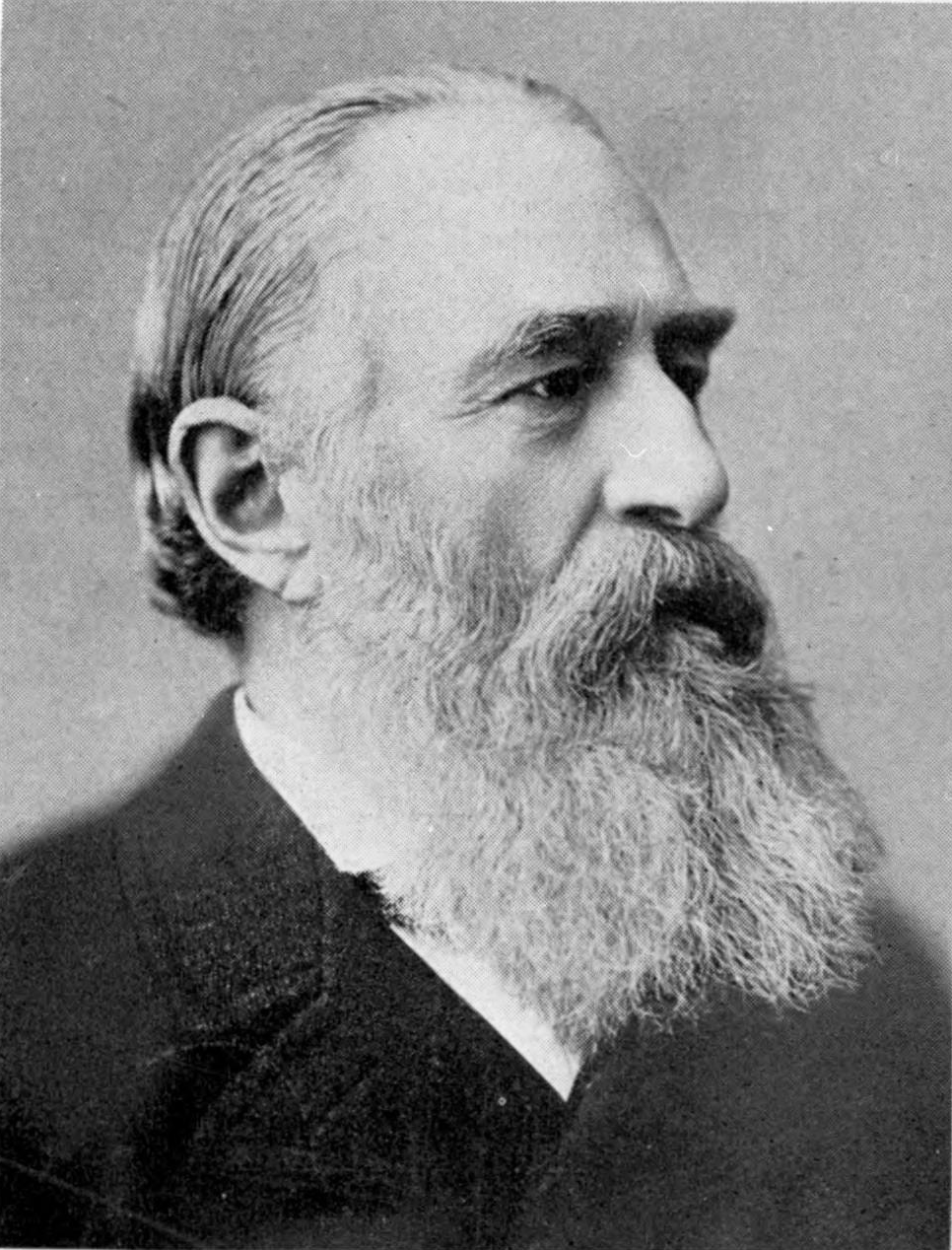

Coroner of Cook County
- In office November 1862 – January 1864
- Preceded by: William James
- Succeeded by: William Wagner

Personal details
- Born: 1830 Ebern, Kingdom of Bavaria
- Died: August 26, 1900 (aged 69–70) Chicago, Illinois, United States
- Party: Socialistic Labor
- Spouse: Therese Weickard
- Children: 4
- Education: University of Würzburg

Military service
- Allegiance: United States of America; Union
- Branch/service: United States Army; Union Army
- Years of service: 1861
- Rank: Major
- Commands: 2nd Missouri Infantry Regiment
- Battles/wars: American Civil War

Ernst Schmidt (1830–1900) was a German American physician, socialist politician, and classical scholar. A Forty-Eighter who participated in the failed Revolutions of 1848, Schmidt immigrated to the United States, settling in Chicago in 1857, where he established himself as a notable figure in both medicine and politics.

== Biography ==
Schmidt was born in Ebern, Bavaria in 1830 and educated at the University of Zurich, Heidelberg University, the Ludwig-Maximilians-Universität München, and the University of Würzburg, the latter from which he graduated in 1852. He attended post-graduate courses at Charles University in Prague before returning to work as a physician at the hospital attached to the University of Würzburg. Following his participation in the 1848 Revolutions, he came to the United States with many of his comrades and began practicing medicine in Chicago. He was one of the organizers and served as vice-president of the German Medical Society of Chicago. He served in the Union Army at the outbreak of the American Civil War as a surgeon for roughly four months before returning to Chicago.

Schmidt was elected Coroner of Cook County in November 1862 and held this position until his resignation in January 1864. From 1867, he was on the staff of the Alexian Brothers Hospital and helped organize the first Jewish hospital in the city in 1869. He also served as a consultant to St. Joseph's Hospital and helped found the German American Dispensary in 1873. In the 1879 Chicago mayoral election, Schmidt ran unsuccessfully as the candidate for the Socialistic Labor Party, garnering 20.39% of the popular vote. In addition to his medical and political pursuits, Schmidt was an active scholar and translator of classical literature. He died on August 26, 1900, in Chicago.
