= Gustav Fischer (politician) =

American politician

Sheriff of Cook County
- In office 1868 – December 1869
- Preceded by: John Lourie Beveridge
- Succeeded by: Benjamin L. Cleaves

Gustav Fischer was an American politician who served as Sheriff of Cook County, Illinois from 1868 until he absconded to parts unknown with his mistress in December 1869, leaving behind his family and a number of disgruntled creditors. His departure caused a legal dispute over the right of succession for the office of County Sheriff, and he was ultimately succeeded by Benjamin L. Cleaves, the Cook County Coroner in April 1870.
