= Seth Hanchett =

American politician

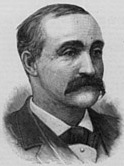

Sheriff of Cook County
- In office 1882–1886
- Preceded by: Orrin L. Mann
- Succeeded by: Canute R. Matson

Personal details
- Born: March 30, 1841 Chautauqua County, New York
- Died: January 6, 1905 (aged 63) Rockford, Iowa
- Party: Republican
- Spouse: Lizzie T. Atkins (m. 1867)

Military service
- Allegiance: United States of America; Union
- Branch/service: United States Army; Union Army
- Years of service: 1861–1862, 1864–1865
- Rank: Sergeant
- Unit: 9th Illinois Cavalry Regiment, 15th New York Volunteer Cavalry Regiment
- Battles/wars: American Civil War: Valley campaigns of 1864; Battle of Five Forks

Seth Hanchett (March 30, 1841 – January 6, 1905) was a Republican lawman and politician in Chicago who served as the Sheriff of Cook County from 1882 to 1886.

== Biography ==
Born in Chautauqua County, New York in 1841, Hanchett settled in Chicago and entered the employ of the North Chicago City Railway Company in 1860. He enlisted in the 9th Illinois Cavalry Regiment of the Union Army at the outbreak of the American Civil War and was discharged due to illness within a year. Shortly afterward, Hanchett returned to New York and enlisted again. He saw service in the Valley campaigns of 1864 and was severely wounded by artillery fire at the Battle of Five Forks in 1865, resulting in the amputation of his entire left arm at the shoulder.

Upon his return to Chicago after the war, Hanchett was superintendent of the city Soldier's Home and in 1867 was appointed bailiff of the County Court. He maintained his position as bailiff under four successive Cook County Sheriffs until the election of Charles Kern. Hanchett was elected Clerk of the Probate Court in 1877 and in 1882 was the Republican nominee for Sheriff, the office of which he won in a heated election. He served as Sheriff of Cook County until 1886. Local Democrats accused him of failing to act to prevent unrest which occurred in Lake Township in 1886, which ultimately saw the Pinkerton Agency being called in to restore order.

Hanchett died in Rockford, Iowa in 1905.
