= John Huffman =

John Huffman may refer to:

- John W. Huffman, professor of organic chemistry
- John Huffman (politician), member of the Oregon House of Representatives
- John Huffman (fencer), American Olympic fencer

== See also ==
- John Hoffman (disambiguation)
