= John Kinzie (disambiguation) =

John Kinzie may refer to:

- John Kinzie (1763–1828), early Chicago settler
- John H. Kinzie (1803–1865), his son, and early Chicago village president
- John Kinzie Clark, early Lake County, Illinois settler
