= John Hoffman =

John Hoffman may refer to:

- John Hoffman (filmmaker) (1904–1980), American montage editor and filmmaker
- John Hoffman (defensive end) (born 1943), American football defensive end
- John Hoffman (running back) (1925–1987), American football running back
- John Hoffman (baseball) (1943–2001), Major League Baseball catcher
- John Jay Hoffman (born 1965), acting attorney general of New Jersey
- John Robert Hoffman, American actor/screenwriter
- John T. Hoffman (1828–1888), Governor of New York, 1869–1872
- John Hoffman (Minnesota politician) (born 1965), Minnesota state senator
- John Hoffman (Illinois politician) (1835–1891), sheriff of Cook County
- John D. Hoffman (1904–2004), American chemist and author
- John H. Hoffman (1929–2021), space scientist
- John Hoffman, drummer of American rock band Primus

== See also ==
- John-Baptist Hoffmann (1857–1928), German Jesuit priest and missionary in India
- John Beck Hofmann (born 1969), American screenwriter and director
- John P. Hoffmann (born 1962), professor of sociology
