= Biba (restaurant) =

Restaurant

- Interactive map of Biba

Restaurant information
- Established: 1989
- Closed: June 8, 2002
- Location: 272 Boylston Street, Boston, Massachusetts, United States
- Coordinates: 42°21′7″N 71°4′10″W

Biba was a restaurant in Boston owned by Lydia Shire. It “opened to great fanfare” in 1989. The restaurant, located on Boylston Street overlooking the Public Garden, was designed by Adam Tihany.

The menu was described as “Shire's own particular eclectic blend of traditional American regional cuisine and New England seafood, with accents of Italy, California and Asia.” Instead of being arranged in traditional categories such as appetizers and entrees, it was divided by meat, starch, "legumina" (vegetables), offal (two different preparations of calves brains; lamb tongue with fava beans) and fish.

In 1998, chef Susan Regis won the James Beard Foundation Award for Best Chef in the Northeast. In 1992, Shire won the same award for her work at the restaurant.

Their Bar was renowned as well, in part for their cigar nights. Shire commissioned Robert Jessup to create a mural that spans the wall above it. She insisted it include a can of anchovies, a man smoking a cigar and a woman's naked breast.

Biba closed on June 6, 2002.

== Notable alumni ==
- Joanne Chang
