= Emil Dietzsch =

German author (1829–1890)

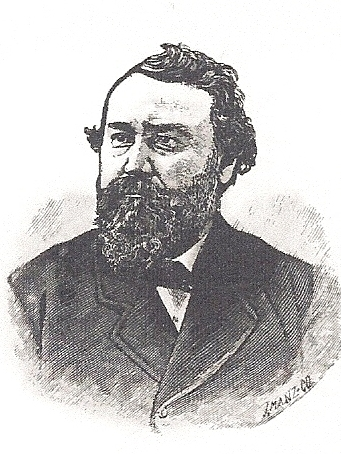

Cook County Coroner
- In office 1874–1878
- Preceded by: John Stephens
- Succeeded by: Orrin L. Mann

Personal details
- Born: March 7, 1829 Frankfurt, German Confederation
- Died: September 12, 1890 (aged 61) Chicago, Illinois, United States
- Spouse(s): Ida Garthe (m. 1857; died 1874) Eliza Schmidt (m. 1878)
- Children: 6
- Education: Heidelberg University
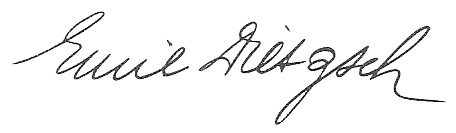
- Signature

Emil Dietzsch (April 7, 1829 – September 12, 1890) was a German American Forty-Eighter who established himself as a journalist, businessman, and Republican politician in 19th century Chicago.

== Biography ==
Dietzsch was born in 1829 in Frankfurt and was educated at prestigious private schools in Frankfurt and Worms. He studied to be an apothecary in Kaiserslautern and attended both the Ludwig-Maximilians-Universität München and Heidelberg University, the latter from which he graduated. He was swept up in the failed Revolutions of 1848, following which he was briefly jailed. After his imprisonment, he practiced for two years as an apothecary in Switzerland before immigrating to the United States. He established a drug store in Chicago in 1854, which was destroyed in the Great Chicago Fire of 1871. After the fire, Dietzsch entered the alcohol industry as a wholesale wine importer.

In addition to business pursuits, Dietzsch was a journalist who actively contributed to English and German language publications such as the Illinois Staats-Zeitung, Puck, and Um Die Welt. Politically, Dietzsch was a Republican, and successfully ran in the 1874 election for Cook County Coroner. He was reelected in 1876 and served in this capacity until he was succeeded by Orrin L. Mann in 1878, the same year Dietzsch was appointed Deputy Sheriff of Cook County. He unsuccessfully ran for the office of City Clerk of Chicago in 1883, losing by a margin of 6,042 votes to Democrat John G. Neumeister.
