= Des Plaines, Illinois =

- City
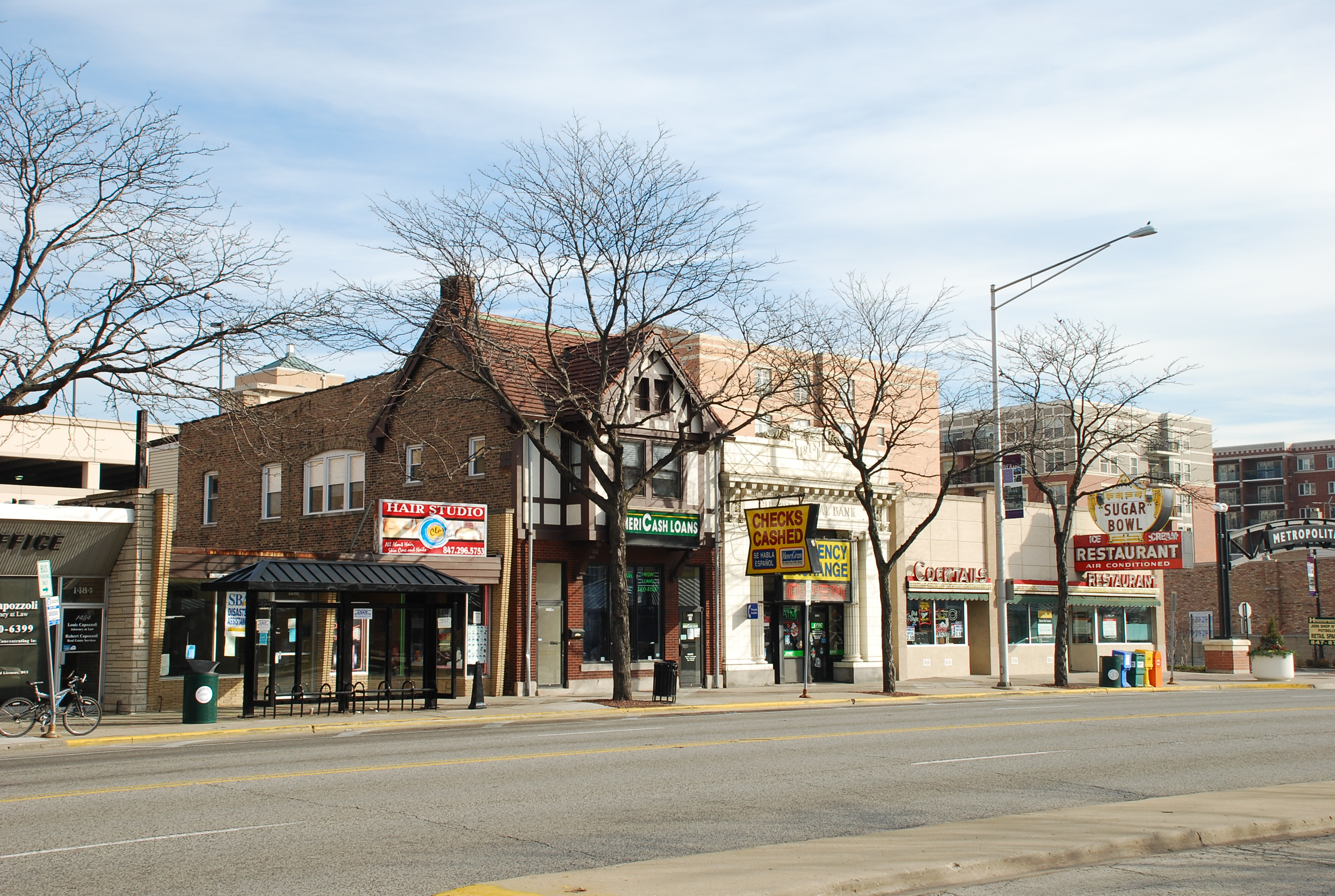
- Downtown

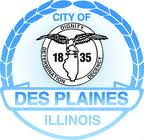
- Flag Seal
- Interactive map of Des Plaines, Illinois
- Location within Greater Chicago Location within Illinois Location within the United States
- Coordinates: 42°2′30″N 87°53′15″W
- Country: United States
- State: Illinois
- County: Cook
- Township: Maine
- Settled: early 1800s
- Incorporated: 1869
- Named for: Des Plaines River

Government
  - Type: Council–manager
  - Mayor: Andrew Goczkowski (D)
  - City Clerk: Dominik Bronakowski

Area
  - Total: 14.39 sq mi (37.26 km^{2})
  - Land: 14.24 sq mi (36.88 km^{2})
  - Water: 0.15 sq mi (0.38 km^{2})
- Elevation: 642 ft (196 m)

Population (2020)
  - Total: 60,675
  - Estimate (2024): 58,832 ▼
  - Rank: 20th in Illinois
  - Density: 4,261.5/sq mi (1,645.36/km^{2})
- Time zone: UTC−06:00 (CST)
  - Summer (DST): UTC−05:00 (CDT)
- ZIP Codes: 60016–60019
- Area codes: 847, 224
- FIPS code: 17-19642
- Website: www.desplainesil.gov

Des Plaines (/dɪs ˈpleɪnz/ dis PLAYNZ) is a city in Cook County, Illinois, United States. Per the 2020 census, the population was 60,675. The city is a suburb of Chicago and is located just north of O'Hare International Airport. It is situated on and is named after the Des Plaines River, which runs through the city just east of its downtown area.

== History ==
Potawatomi, Ottawa, and Ojibwe (Chippewa) Native American tribes inhabited the Des Plaines River Valley prior to Europeans' arrival. When French explorers and missionaries arrived in the 1600s in what was then the Illinois Country of New France, they named the waterway La Rivière des Plaines (English translation: "Plains River") as they felt that trees on the river resembled European plane trees. The first white settlers came from the eastern United States in 1833, after the signing of the 1833 Treaty of Chicago, followed by many German immigrants during the 1840s and '50s. In the 1850s, the land in this area was purchased by the Illinois and Wisconsin Land Company along a railroad line planned between Chicago and Janesville, Wisconsin. In 1852, the developers built a steam-powered mill next to the river to cut local trees into railroad ties. Socrates Rand then bought the mill and converted it into a grist mill, which attracted local farmers. The Illinois and Wisconsin Railroad made its first stop in the area in the fall of 1854.

The earliest-known tornado in Illinois struck a location reported as Jefferson, contemporarily found to be modern-day Des Plaines, on May 22, 1855. It killed 3 in a granite home lifted off of its foundation. The correspondence between the Smithsonian Institution's Joseph Henry and the Daily Democratic Press in Chicago would lead to the eventual creation of the United States Signal Company, which is the earliest predecessor of the modern-day National Weather Service.

In 1857, the Chicago, St. Paul, and Fond du Lac Railroad began running its route, stopping near the mill on the Des Plaines river, where a small business section had grown up. The railroad platted the prospective town of Rand at the site. In 1859, the Chicago and North Western Railway purchased the rail line, giving the train station the name "Des Plaines." In 1869, the Rand subdivision's name was changed to Des Plaines, and the village of Des Plaines was then incorporated.

Des Plaines was reincorporated in 1873 and elected a village board the following year. Local brick manufacturer Franklin Whitcomb served as the first Village President.

In 1925, village residents voted to convert to a city form of government and annexed the village of Riverview to the south. Subsequent annexations included the Orchard Place area in 1956. The city experienced rapid growth after World War II and with the opening of nearby O'Hare International Airport.

In 1955, Des Plaines became the site of the ninth McDonald's restaurant, which was often inaccurately claimed to be the first McDonald's franchise, and which was torn down in 1984 and replaced by a museum the following year. The museum was demolished in 2018 after repeated flooding.

In 1979, Des Plaines was the site of the accident of American Airlines Flight 191, in which a McDonnell Douglas DC-10 departing from O'Hare lost an engine and wing material and crashed near a local trailer park just north of Touhy Avenue. All 271 people on board the aircraft died, as did two workers at a repair garage. Two more, along with three civilians, were injured.

In 2008, the Illinois Gaming Board awarded the state's 10th casino license to Midwest Gaming and Entertainment LLC to build a 140,000-square-foot (13,000 m^{2}) casino on approximately 21 acres (85,000 m^{2}) adjacent to the Tri-State Tollway at the northwest corner of Devon Avenue and Des Plaines River Road. Midwest Gaming received the award despite having the lowest bid because other bidders were found unacceptable by the Board, with one board member finding no bidders acceptable. The city approved zoning in early 2010, and the casino opened in July 2011 as Rivers Casino.

In July 2022, the third largest winning lotto ticket in U.S. history, valued at $1.34 billion, was sold at a Speedway gas station in Des Plaines near O'Hare Airport on Touhy Avenue. As of November 2022, the winning ticket holder has not come forward or been identified.

== Geography ==
According to the 2021 census gazetteer files, Des Plaines has a total area of 14.38 square miles (37.24 km^{2}), of which 14.24 square miles (36.88 km^{2}) (or 98.98%) is land and 0.15 square miles (0.39 km^{2}) (or 1.02%) is water.

Des Plaines is traversed by two interstate highways – I-90 (the Northwest Tollway) and I-294 (the Tri-State Tollway).

Des Plaines is named for the Des Plaines River, which flows through it. The name is from 18th-century French referencing the American sycamore which resembles the European plane tree.

Portions of Des Plaines are underlain by the "Des Plaines Disturbance," an area in which the layers of sedimentary rock are highly abnormal. This probably represents an ancient meteorite crater, 75 to 200 feet (23 to 61 m) beneath the town. The bedrock was highly fractured by the impact, with large blocks of sediment upended. The crater was eventually filled by glacial activity, so that no trace now remains on the surface.

Addresses in the city limits of Des Plaines have their own numbering system. Areas in unincorporated Maine Township have Des Plaines postal addresses that follow the Chicago numbering system. Devon Avenue in Des Plaines is 3200 South, while it is 6400 North in Chicago. Golf Road runs through a large unincorporated area as 9600 North with a Des Plaines mailing address but is 0 North/South when entering the Des Plaines city limits. As sections become incorporated, they take on the city numbering system. For instance in 2003, land at 9661 West Golf Road, Des Plaines, became 2323 East Golf Road, Des Plaines, when it was formally incorporated into the city limits. The largest unincorporated areas are in the O'Hare area and east of the Tri-State Tollway.

=== Climate ===
Des Plaines is in the hot-summer humid continental climate, or Köppen Dfa zone. The zone includes four distinct seasons. Winter is cold with snow. Spring warms up with precipitation and storms, some of which can be severe and include tornadoes. Summer has high precipitation and storms. Fall cools down.

Climate data for Des Plaines, IL, based on O'Hare (~2.5 miles away) (1990-2020)
Month	Jan	Feb	Mar	Apr	May	Jun	Jul	Aug	Sep	Oct	Nov	Dec	Year
Mean daily maximum °F (°C)	31.6 (−0.2)	35.7 (2.1)	47.0 (8.3)	59.0 (15.0)	70.5 (21.4)	80.4 (26.9)	84.5 (29.2)	82.5 (28.1)	75.5 (24.2)	62.7 (17.1)	48.4 (9.1)	36.6 (2.6)	59.5 (15.3)
Daily mean °F (°C)	25.2 (−3.8)	28.8 (−1.8)	39.0 (3.9)	49.7 (9.8)	60.6 (15.9)	70.6 (21.4)	75.4 (24.1)	73.8 (23.2)	66.3 (19.1)	54.0 (12.2)	41.3 (5.2)	30.5 (−0.8)	51.3 (10.7)
Mean daily minimum °F (°C)	18.8 (−7.3)	21.8 (−5.7)	31.0 (−0.6)	40.3 (4.6)	50.6 (10.3)	60.8 (16.0)	66.4 (19.1)	65.1 (18.4)	57.1 (13.9)	45.4 (7.4)	34.1 (1.2)	24.4 (−4.2)	43.0 (6.1)
Average precipitation inches (mm)	1.99 (51)	1.97 (50)	2.45 (62)	3.75 (95)	4.49 (114)	4.10 (104)	3.71 (94)	4.25 (108)	3.19 (81)	3.43 (87)	2.42 (61)	2.11 (54)	37.86 (961)
Average snowfall inches (cm)	11.3 (29)	10.7 (27)	5.5 (14)	1.3 (3.3)	0 (0)	0 (0)	0 (0)	0.0 (0.0)	0 (0)	0.2 (0.51)	1.8 (4.6)	7.6 (19)	38.4 (97.41)
Source: NWS/NOAA

== Demographics ==
Historical population
Census	Pop.	Note	%±
1880	818		—
1890	986		20.5%
1900	1,666		69.0%
1910	2,348		40.9%
1920	3,451		47.0%
1930	8,798		154.9%
1940	9,518		8.2%
1950	14,994		57.5%
1960	34,886		132.7%
1970	57,239		64.1%
1980	53,568		−6.4%
1990	53,223		−0.6%
2000	58,720		10.3%
2010	58,364		−0.6%
2020	60,675		4.0%
U.S. Decennial Census; 2010 2020

=== Racial and ethnic composition ===
Des Plaines city, Illinois – Racial and ethnic composition Note: the US Census treats Hispanic/Latino as an ethnic category. This table excludes Latinos from the racial categories and assigns them to a separate category. Hispanics/Latinos may be of any race.
Race / Ethnicity (NH = Non-Hispanic)	Pop 2000	Pop 2010	Pop 2020	% 2000	% 2010	% 2020
White alone (NH)	44,635	39,689	35,977	76.01%	68.00%	59.29%
Black or African American alone (NH)	558	963	1,385	0.95%	1.65%	2.28%
Native American or Alaska Native alone (NH)	73	63	41	0.12%	0.11%	0.07%
Asian alone (NH)	4,459	6,613	9,153	7.59%	11.33%	15.09%
Pacific Islander alone (NH)	9	9	8	0.02%	0.02%	0.01%
Other race alone (NH)	63	97	205	0.11%	0.17%	0.34%
Mixed race or Multiracial (NH)	694	877	1,449	1.18%	1.50%	2.39%
Hispanic or Latino (any race)	8,229	10,053	12,457	14.01%	17.22%	20.53%
Total	58,720	58,364	60,675	100.00%	100.00%	100.00%

=== 2020 census ===
As of the 2020 census, Des Plaines had a population of 60,675. There were 23,599 households and 14,785 families residing in the city. The population density was 4,218.23 inhabitants per square mile (1,628.67/km^{2}). The median age was 43.3 years. 18.2% of residents were under the age of 18 and 20.1% were 65 years of age or older. For every 100 females there were 96.1 males, and for every 100 females age 18 and over there were 94.1 males age 18 and over.

Of the 23,599 households, 26.2% had children under the age of 18 living in them. Of all households, 50.5% were married-couple households, 17.9% were households with a male householder and no spouse or partner present, and 26.5% were households with a female householder and no spouse or partner present. About 29.1% of all households were made up of individuals and 14.2% had someone living alone who was 65 years of age or older.

There were 25,094 housing units at an average density of 1,744.58 per square mile (673.59/km^{2}); 6.0% were vacant. The homeowner vacancy rate was 1.3% and the rental vacancy rate was 11.7%.

100.0% of residents lived in urban areas, while 0.0% lived in rural areas.

Racial composition as of the 2020 census
Race	Number	Percent
White	37,875	62.4%
Black or African American	1,459	2.4%
American Indian and Alaska Native	613	1.0%
Asian	9,239	15.2%
Native Hawaiian and Other Pacific Islander	12	0.0%
Some other race	5,607	9.2%
Two or more races	5,870	9.7%
Hispanic or Latino (of any race)	12,457	20.5%

=== 2000 census ===
A notable number of Cook County residents reside in unincorporated areas which use a Des Plaines zip code. These areas are densely populated and consist primarily of high density, multi-family housing with a very high percentage of foreign born residents. In the 2000 census the population of these unincorporated areas of Cook County assigned Des Plaines zip codes was 25,617. This unincorporated area has never been a part of the city of Des Plaines, and the majority of this area is separated from the actual city of Des Plaines by a belt of Forest Preserve lands and a Tollway barrier created by I-294.

== Economy ==
According to the city's 2021 Comprehensive Annual Financial Report, the major employers in the city are Rivers Casino (Des Plaines), Universal Oil Products, Oakton Community College, Sysco Food Services, Juno Lighting, Holy Family Medical Center, Wheels Inc. (passenger car and truck leasing), and LSG Sky Chefs.

China Airlines maintains their Chicago office in Des Plaines. It was previously located in Michigan Plaza in the Chicago Loop.

== Arts and culture ==
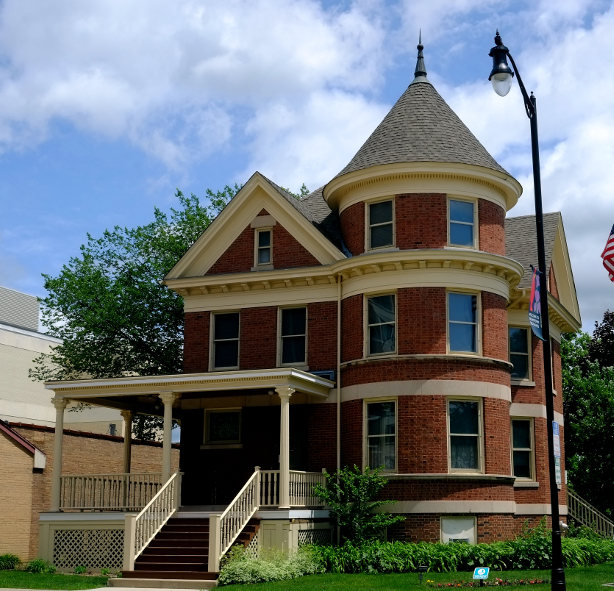
The Kinder House (1907) at the Des Plaines History Center

- Big Bend Lake, a 27-acre (11 ha) lake linked to the Des Plaines River by a spillway and a fishing destination
- Des Plaines History Center
- Des Plaines Methodist Camp Ground, listed on the National Register of Historic Places, predates the city (founded 1860) and is still active every summer with concerts, day camps, swimming & recreation, picnics, etc.
- Des Plaines Public Library
- Des Plaines Theatre, historic 1925 movie theater, renovated and reopened in 2021, hosts a variety of entertainment acts
- Lake Opeka in Lake Park
- Mystic Waters Family Aquatic Center
- Maryville Academy, center for under-privileged children, which hosts the Chicagoland Sports Hall of Fame
- Rivers Casino
- 100 Gecs tree

== Education ==
College campuses include:

- Oakton College, opened in 1969; a community college with campuses in Skokie and Des Plaines

Public school districts include:

- Elementary and middle school: District 62, District 59 and District 63
- High school: District 207 with Maine West High School

Private schools include:

- Immanuel Lutheran School
- The Science and Arts Academy
- The Willows Academy

== Infrastructure ==
=== Rail ===
The Des Plaines station and Cumberland station provide Metra commuter rail service along the Union Pacific Northwest Line. Trains travel southeast to the Ogilvie Transportation Center, and northwest to either Harvard station or McHenry station. Metra's North Central Service travels through the city but does not stop.

=== Bus ===
Pace provides bus service on multiple routes connecting Des Plaines to destinations across the region. The Pace Pulse Dempster Line travels through the city on its route between Evanston and O'Hare.

=== Major highways ===
Major highways in Des Plaines include:

Interstate Highways
Interstate 90
Interstate 294

US Highways
US 12
US 14
US 45

Illinois Highways
Route 58
Route 72
Route 83

== Notable people ==
- Adolph Bachmeier, soccer player
- Matthew Bogusz, an advertising executive who was elected Mayor of Des Plaines at age 26
- Perry Caravello, actor and comedian, lived in Des Plaines as a child.
- Eileen Fisher, clothing designer. She was raised in Des Plaines.
- Adrian Fulle, managing member of film production company
- Shawn Green, right fielder with the Toronto Blue Jays, LA Dodgers, Arizona Diamondbacks, and New York Mets; two time all-star; born in Des Plaines.
- Patrick Hickey, soccer player
- Peter M. Hoffman, politician who served as Cook County Sheriff, Cook County Coroner, and a member of the Cook County Board of Commissioners
- Michael Kleen, folklorist, publisher, and social commentator
- Tyler Ladendorf, second baseman with Oakland Athletics
- Matteo Lane, stand-up comedian
- Damian Las, soccer player
- Jill Morgenthaler, US Army colonel; politician; Homeland Security adviser in Illinois; lived in Des Plaines
- Marty Moylan, an Illinois State Representative who served as Mayor of Des Plaines until 2013
- Pelican, a post-metal band.
- Robert Reed, actor (The Brady Bunch, 1969–1974); grew up in Des Plaines
- Jacky Rosen, United States Senator from Nevada (2019–present). She was raised in Des Plaines until her family moved to Arlington Heights, Illinois, when she was in high school.
- Rick Zombo, defenseman with the Detroit Red Wings, St. Louis Blues, and Boston Bruins; born in Des Plaines

== In popular culture ==
The majority of the hit 1985 film The Breakfast Club was filmed at the now-defunct Maine North High School located in unincorporated Des Plaines.

The 100 Gecs tree used in the album cover of the 100 Gecs album 1000 Gecs is located in Des Plaines.
