= Willows Academy =

- Academia Salices

Location
- 1015 Rose Avenue; 42°2′20.1″N 87°53′54.8″W; Des Plaines, Illinois 60016; United States

Information
- Type: Private, All Women
- Motto: Veritatem Facientes in Caritate (Proclaiming the truth in love. Ephesians 4: 15)
- Principal: Katie Stangel
- Chaplain: Fr. Pete Arrigada
- Grades: 6–12
- Colors: Blue and White
- Fight song: "Eagles soar, eagles soar, fight to win, beat the foe, up the score, we are blue and white, we will always fight, eagles soar, eagles soar!"
- Mascot: Penelope the Eagle
- Team name: Eagles
- Accreditation: American Independent Schools Association
- Newspaper: The Eaglette, formerly Beyond the Clock
- Tuition: $17,600 (high school), $12,400 (middle school)
- Affiliation: Opus Dei
- Website: www.willowsacademy.org

Willows Academy is an all-girls private school in Des Plaines, Illinois, United States, with its religious education under the direction of Opus Dei. The school is divided into the Middle School (6–8) and High School (9–12). The original school was located on Vernon Avenue in Glencoe, IL. The second location was in Niles, IL.

The school is a member of the Illinois High School Association and the Independent Schools' League. The academy was named one of the best 50 Catholic secondary schools in the nation in 2008 and is on the 2008 Catholic High School Honor Roll.

== History ==
The school was founded in 1974 by a group of parents and educators in the Chicago area.

== Athletics ==
Willows Academy has four sports that compete under IHSA regulations in the Class 1A division. The Willows offers a variety of athletics to girls in all grades.

The Willows is associated with the Independent Schools League (ISL) and competes in inter-league volleyball, cross country, basketball, softball and soccer.

Middle School Athletics: Volleyball, Cross County, Basketball, Soccer, Softball

High School Athletics: Volleyball, Cross Country, Tennis, Basketball, Soccer, Softball, Track and Field
