= Benjamin L. Cleaves =

American politician (1835–1883)

Coroner of Cook County
- In office 1869 – November 1870
- Preceded by: William Wagner
- Succeeded by: John Stephens

Sheriff of Cook County
- In office April 1870 – November 1870
- Preceded by: Gustav Fischer
- Succeeded by: Timothy Bradley

Personal details
- Born: June 25, 1835 Portland, Maine, U.S.
- Died: March 8, 1883 (aged 47) Chicago, Illinois, U.S.

Benjamin L. Cleaves (June 25, 1835 – March 8, 1883) was an American politician who briefly served as both the Coroner of Cook County and ex officio Sheriff of Cook County. He assumed the office of Sheriff after his predecessor, Gustav Fischer, absconded in December 1869, leaving behind his family and a number of disgruntled creditors.

Cleaves was a police sergeant in Chicago before the beginning of the American Civil War. He enlisted in the 1st Illinois Artillery, serving as a private in Battery A. He fought in multiple battles, including the Battle of Shiloh and the Siege of Vicksburg.

Discharged from the Union Army in 1864, Cleaves returned to Chicago. On July 4, 1867, Cleaves' right arm was accidentally blown off by a cannon during an Independence Day celebration. He ran for Coroner of Cook County in 1868 and won the election in November. He resigned a position as a police substation manager to fill the coroner's office.

Cleaves drowned in the Chicago River on March 8, 1883.
