= Des Plaines History Center =

American non-profit organization

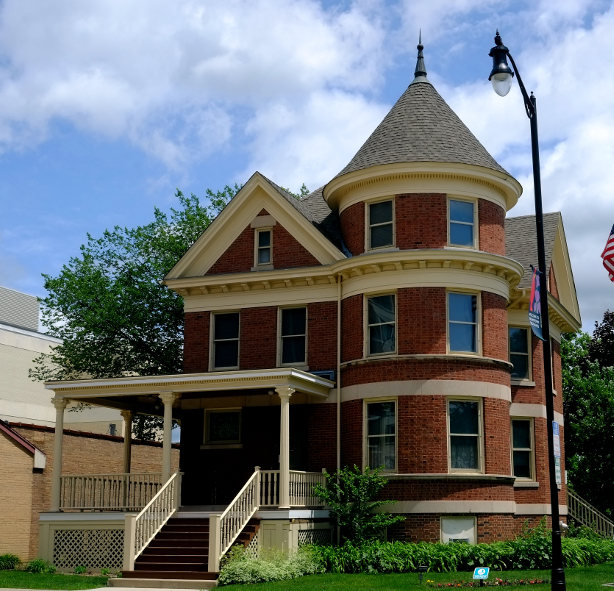
The Kinder House at the Des Plaines History Center

The Des Plaines History Center is located in Des Plaines, Illinois, and serves as a non-profit organization that collects donated artifacts and documents that are accessible to the public through research facilities, exhibits, and public programs. The Des Plaines History Center contains an archival collection, and also includes the Kinder House Museum.

== History ==
The first and earliest Des Plaines Historical Society was founded in 1935. They published a few of their own newsletters with an ambition to inform and write about the history of Des Plaines. Unfortunately, most of this material has been lost, and the first historical society was later disbanded. Around thirty years later in 1967, a new Historical Society was founded under the same name. A few years later, they made the Kinder House the building in which they collected and preserved artifacts, as well as displaying exhibits to the public.

The Des Plaines Savings and Loan Association built a building at 781 Pearson Street. It was later used as a place for different employments, including a dental office and a beauty salon. In 2002, with limited room to hold the collections and a will to further interest people in the history of Des Plaines, the History Center acquired the Des Plaines Savings and Loan Association’s edifice, and is today known as the “Visitor Center.” Here, people can view exhibits, become a member of the society, participate in programs, and even buy from the museum's gift shop.

== Kinder House ==
Benjamin F. Kinder, owner of a hardware store, built a house in 1907. The Kinder family lived here until the 1960s, and the house was already viewed as a historical building of Des Plaines by 1969. The original location of the house was at 777 Lee Street, but was moved to its present location at 789 Pearson Street in 1978. The significance of the Kinder House comes from its past inhabitants and architectural style. Benjamin Kinder was the owner of one of the city’s longest-standing businesses, and his son George served as Des Plaines’ third mayor. The Kinder House is referenced to the term Queen Anne which was a popular style in the late 19th and early 20th centuries’ architecture. These homes contain bay windows, asymmetrical facades, gables, etc. The Kinder House particularly possesses features such as the wrap-around porch and a round three-story corner tower. Since the Kinder House did not have as much ornamentation as other homes of the Queen Anne style, it was viewed as an example of a late, modified style of the Queen Anne. Upon moving the home to its present location, the structure of the Kinder House was left nearly the same as it was built with an exception to the exterior porches. The brickwork, woodwork, windows, cabinets, and floor plans remain intact from the Kinder household. Now, the Kinder House serves as a museum, where touring is available on appointment.

== Public programs ==
The Des Plaines Historical Society is an ambitious organization seeking to involve community people and businesses in special events, to discover the roots and origin of their city. The society was successful in creating a newsletter called, “The Cobweb,” creating a Des Plaines History Center Blog, providing membership, and providing public programs for both adults and children in the Des Plaines History Center.

In the Des Plaines History Center, book discussion groups meet every two months to discuss a history book. Nearly each month, Coffee Talks are hosted as well. Here, adults may participate in meeting an author of a book mentioned in the book discussion groups, talk about an exhibit being hosted, or chat about a historical event brought to attention by the historical society. Also, several times per year, a program called Historic Adventures is run by two volunteer coordinators. Groups of interested people take field trips to local historic places to learn about the past of not only Des Plaines, but neighboring cities and places as well.

There are also programs specifically for kids in elementary school. School Days Off takes place on select days off for District 62, where kids are invited to get involved in arts and crafts or learn about historical lifestyles, such as family life, wars, and famous buildings. A particular program called Afternoon Adventures, brings kids to the museum to learn about living in Des Plaines during the 19th and 20th centuries.

The History Center also hosts events on federal and local holidays, including Chinese New Year, Des Plaines Spring Fun Fair, the Fourth of July, the Des Plaines Summer Fling, Des Plaines Fall Fest, Halloween Hoopla/Día de los Muertos, and the winter holidays.

== Exhibits ==
Along with the Kinder House, the Des Plaines History Center offers a regular schedule of temporary exhibits. The most recent was entitled: “Deco in Des Plaines: An International Style in Everyday Life.” This exhibit portrayed the fashions, decorations, and architecture of Des Plaines in the 1920s and 1930s. The exhibit displayed photographs, clothing, and common household items that showed qualities of the early 1900s.

== Collections ==
The Des Plaines History Center has collected countless items throughout several decades. It obtained over 31,000 objects and documents.
