= Canute R. Matson =

American lawyer (1843–1903)

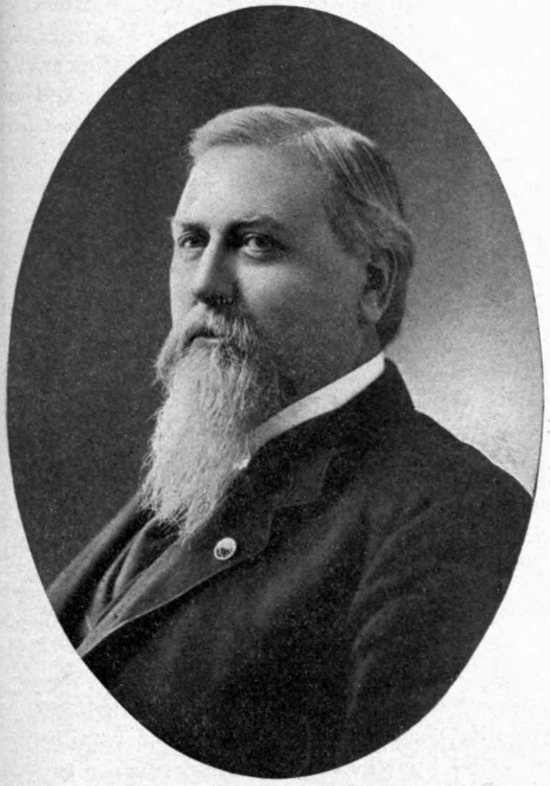

Sheriff of Cook County
- In office 1886–1890
- Preceded by: Seth Hanchett
- Succeeded by: James H. Gilbert

Cook County Coroner
- In office 1880–1882
- Preceded by: Orrin L. Mann
- Succeeded by: N.B. Boyden

Personal details
- Born: Canute Rognald Matson; March 9, 1843 Voss, Norway
- Died: January 12, 1903 (aged 59) Chicago, Illinois, United States
- Party: Republican

Canute Rognald Matson (April 9, 1843 – January 12, 1903) became Cook County Sheriff in the aftermath of the 1886 Haymarket Square Riot in Chicago.

== Background ==
Knut Rognald Matson was born on the Opkvitne farm at Voss Municipality in Søndre Bergenhus county, Norway.

== Political career ==
In 1882, at the Cook County Republican convention, Seth Hanchett won the Republican nomination for Cook County sheriff over Matson, who was vying for the position. Hanchett would go on to win the general election.

During May 1886, while Matson was Deputy Sheriff of Cook County, the Haymarket Riot resulted in the death of several policemen. A number of arrests were made and charges were brought against eight men who were incarcerated in the Cook County Jail supervised by Matson. Later in 1886, he succeeded Seth Hanchett as Sheriff of Cook County.

He was a delegate from Illinois to 1888 Republican National Convention.
