= Des Plaines Methodist Camp Ground =

Historic district in Illinois, United States

- U.S. National Register of Historic Places
- U.S. Historic district
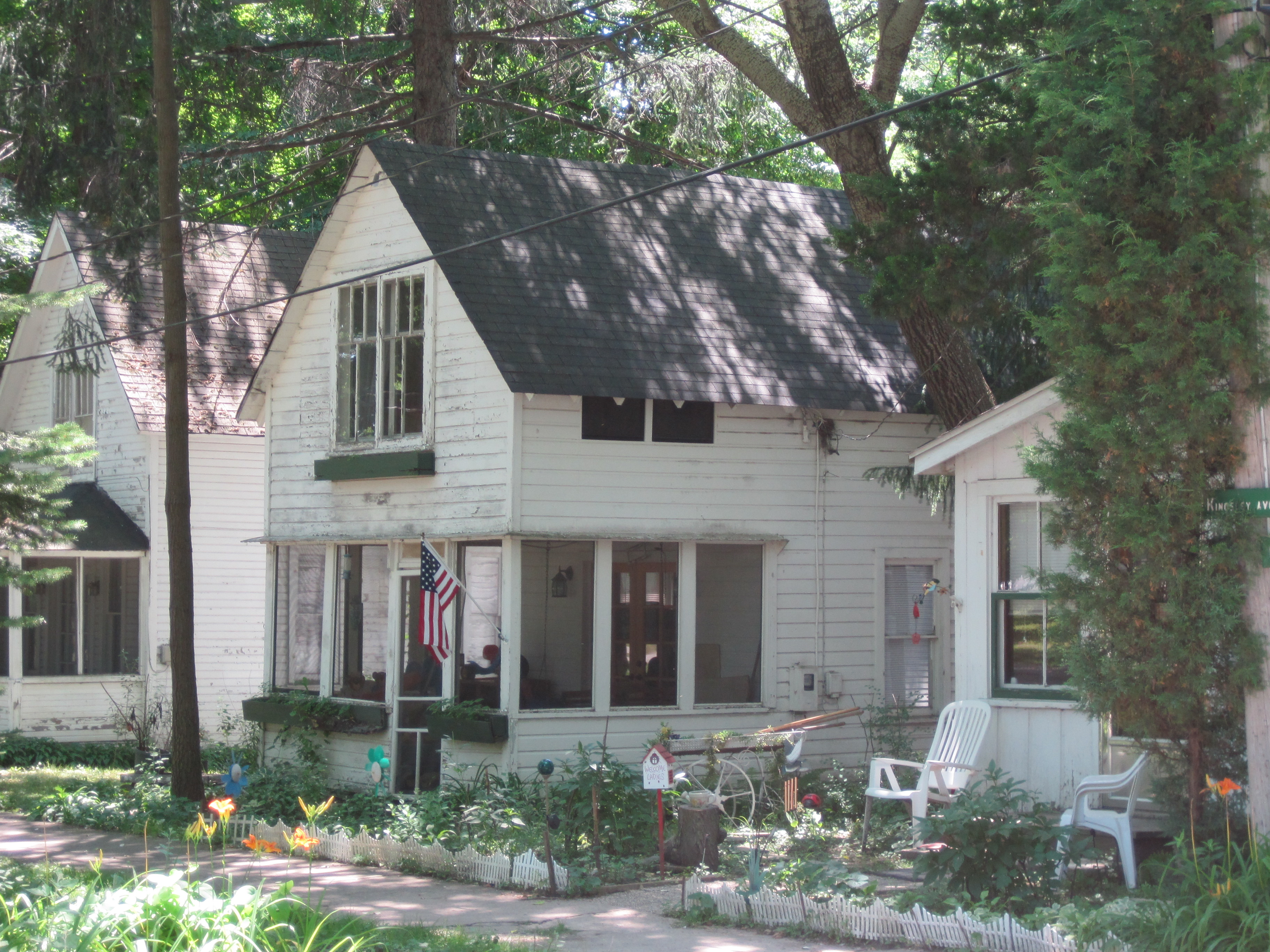

- Location within Illinois Location within the United States
- Location: 1900 E Algonquin Road, Des Plaines, Illinois
- Area: 35 acres (14 ha)
- Built: 1860/1865
- Architect: Fugard and Thielbar
- Architectural style: Late Victorian, Camp Meeting Cottages
- NRHP reference No.: 05000429
- Added to NRHP: May 22, 2005

Des Plaines Methodist Camp Ground is a historic Methodist church camp at 1250 Campground Road in Des Plaines, Illinois, USA.

The annual camp meeting was established in 1860 by a group of Methodist ministers and businessmen, including the future war hero and Illinois Governor John L. Beveridge, on the scenic land of Squire Socrates Rand along the Des Plaines River. At the end of the US Civil War in 1865 approximately 25 equally scenic acres downstream (in what some deem to be the lowest geographical point in the Midwest) were purchased from Squire Rand with donations. Upon these grounds the meetings have been held annually without interruption. The Chicago District Camp Ground Association was granted a charter in 1867 and continues to be led by an elected Board of Trustees.

Chosen for its proximity to Chicago (about 16 miles), Squire Rand's properties bordered both a C&NW train line and a road that served travelers from the college town of Evanston, Illinois, home to Northwestern University then and now. This location was chosen to bring Midwesterners together to express their Christian faith outdoors.

Each summer in the early years devout Methodists staked out the groves to create a tent city, including boardwalks with signposts. A large clearing served as the main sanctuary where a platform speaker's stand served as stage for the ministers and choirs. Upwards of 10,000 people filled the groves for the large meetings. A train depot was eventually built to add a stop to the train lines from Chicago to save people from the mile-long walk from downtown Des Plaines. The ticket booth still stands off Campground Road, which runs parallel to the CNW train line.

By the mid 1860s, devoted participants had tired of pitching tents. They began building temporary cottages meant to stand for 5–10 years. Many still stand today. Most of the current 100 cottages were built between 1870 and 1930 in a uniform late Victorian architecture style as found on Martha's Vineyard.

Several important meeting houses were built for the many ongoing gatherings. In 1903 the American Tabernacle was built based on the architectural principles of the Eiffel Tower, rendering it devoid of support pillars that might obstruct a view of the stage. Later named the Waldorf Tabernacle (after Bishop Ernest Lynn Waldorf), its circular shape mimics the original tents and other similar tabernacles built for similar Chautauqua meetings throughout the United States. Cottages built around the circle are among the oldest surviving. All cottages are built on paths that lead to at least one of the many tabernacles.

In 1906 the current Wesley Tabernacle was built as the new Swedish Tabernacle. A small, round Norwegian Tabernacle that could be seen from Algonquin Road caved in from heavy snows in the late 1990s. In the early decades of camp meeting, groups of Swedes, Germans, Norwegians and other ethnicities still spoke the mother tongue, creating a mild segregation which faded with time and assimilation.

Famous frequenters to the campground included D. L. Moody, Frances E. Willard, Billy Sunday, Mahalia Jackson and other Christian celebrities of local and international acclaim.

Camp meeting met uninterrupted from 1860 through the early 2000s, at which time the nature of camp meeting was renamed and reformatted. It still includes ongoing Sunday worship services and summer events. Residents continue to own and rent cottages during the months between May and October, with one cottage designated for a year-round caretaker.

In the early years, minor floods came no more than every seven years in the spring, creating very little inconvenience to campers. Due to excessive urban build-up in the outlying swamp tributaries to the Des Plaines River, the camp is subject to more and more floods each year, rising to levels that put some two-story cottages underwater to the rafters.

The camp was added to the National Register of Historic Places in 2005.
