= Des Plaines Public Library =

Public library in Des Plaines, Illinois, US

- 42°2′26″N 87°53′14″W
- Location: 1501 Ellinwood Street, Des Plaines, Illinois, USA
- Established: April 1905

Collection
- Size: 307,061

Access and use
- Circulation: 666,541
- Members: 35,000

Other information
- Public transit access: Metra's Union Pacific Northwest line—the Des Plaines stop is directly in front of (north of) the Library. Six Pace bus lines also stop at the Metra station or across Miner Street from the station: 208, 209, 226, 230, 234, 250.
- Website: www.dppl.org

Des Plaines Public Library is a public library serving the city of Des Plaines, Illinois. It is located at 1501 Ellinwood Street, in Des Plaines, Illinois.

== History ==
The construction of a library in Des Plaines was first proposed in 1896, but was defeated by a vote of 142 to 50. In 1904, a subscription library called the Tabard Inn was established in F.C. Walton's drugstore on Ellinwood Street in Des Plaines, Illinois, with F.C. Walton himself paying for most of the service, and in April 1905, another proposition to establish a Free Public Library finally carried by a majority vote. Prior to approval of the library proposition, Dr. Clarence A. Earle corresponded with philanthropist Andrew Carnegie asking him to fund the building of a library, resulting in a $5,000.00 construction grant. The first Library Board meeting was held on May 2, 1906, in the Village Hall located at the corner of Ellinwood and Lee Streets in Des Plaines, Illinois.

The first Des Plaines Public Library building was constructed on the corner of Miner Street and Graceland Avenue, and was dedicated on October 5, 1907. Mrs. Sarah Weeks was the first librarian, receiving a salary of $10 per month and remaining in the position until 1915. The library's initial collection consisted of 725 books, and business hours were Tuesday and Saturday from 3 to 5 and 7 to 9 p.m.

In 1936, the city council announced a plan to construct a new municipal building on the library site. The project received financing through the WPA. During construction of the new city hall and municipal building, the library took up residence on the first floor of the former Des Plaines State Bank.

The new Municipal Building was dedicated on June 29, 1937. The building housed the library in the west wing, City Hall in the center, and a fire station in the east wing. The library featured 7,000 books and 1,500 feet (460 m) of shelving. The modern equipment included slant-top tables for the children, indirect lighting, and angled racks to display periodicals. Special features included an office for the librarian and headquarters for the Girl Scouts of the USA. In 1951 a children's room was opened in the basement.

In 1957, ground was broken for a new 16,000-square-foot (1,500 m^{2}) library at the corner of Thacker Street and Graceland Avenue. The Colonial Williamsburg-style building was dedicated on November 2, 1958. A small addition to the library was built in 1970 to house the bookmobile and provide additional staff office space. Construction of another addition, this one being 20,700 square feet (1,920 m^{2}), completed in 1974 resulting in a near doubling of the size of the library. On June 19, 1969, the first library bookmobile began biweekly service to each of the city's neighborhoods, in an effort to meet the needs of the expanding population.

In 1990, the bookmobile was replaced by a new Mobile Library. The Mobile Library made over forty stops in its two-week rotation. In addition to neighborhood stops, it visited preschools, elementary schools and senior centers.

In May 1997, Library Board President John Burke met with Mayor Paul Jung to discuss the possibility of a new library becoming an anchor for the downtown redevelopment project. The City Council, the Library Board of Trustees, the Economic Development Commission, and the developer spent the next 18 months working out the details of making the new library a reality. Ground was broken for the new library on April 15, 1999. The four story, 82,000-square-foot (7,600 m^{2}) library building was designed by Lohan and Associates and constructed by Leopardo Construction. The approximate dimensions of the building are 152’-4" feet wide, 150’-8" feet deep, and 68 feet (21 m) tall. The north face of the building features aluminum accent panels in aged or patina copper with relief work representing open books. Within the bands, "Des Plaines Library" is spelled out in binary code. The new library opened on August 14, 2000.

The library building contains major artworks by Fred Nagelbach, Pae White, Robert Jessup, Michael Hayden and Kristina Lucas, and Joe Walters, funded by donations from community residents and organizations.

The Des Plaines Public Library celebrated its Centennial anniversary in the year 2007, with a number of special events, promotions and exhibits. The library loans over one million items to library patrons and receives over 500,000 visits annually. The library's collections hold over 360,000 items at any one time. The library also offers downloadable books, music, films, magazines and comics to its cardholders.

The Friends of the Des Plaines Public Library organization was founded in 1964. Their regular book sales fund many public programs and special library projects. In 2004, the Friends donated a bronze sculpture of young Abraham Lincoln to the library. This sculpture was originally designed by Guido Rebechini in the 1930s.

Mobile library service was retired in January 2012. In 2014, the Youth Services department began a three-year project to create an expanded early literacy center for families of small children on the second floor. The architect for this project was Product Architecture and Design. In 2015, the library began a renovation of multiple spaces throughout the building, working with Lohan Anderson, Troop Contracting and Thomas Interior Systems. The library will spend $2.4 million of reserve funds to create new instruction, programming, teen, and other public spaces in the building.

== Current operation ==
The current Des Plaines Public Library is located at:

1501 Ellinwood Street
Des Plaines, IL 60016

Library hours are: 9 am to 9 pm—Monday through Friday, 9 am to 5 pm—Saturday, 1 to 5 pm—Sunday.

The Des Plaines Library has approximately 35,000 cardholders and circulated 666,541 physical and e-materials in 2021.
