= Orrin L. Mann =

American politician

Orrin Lorentna Mann
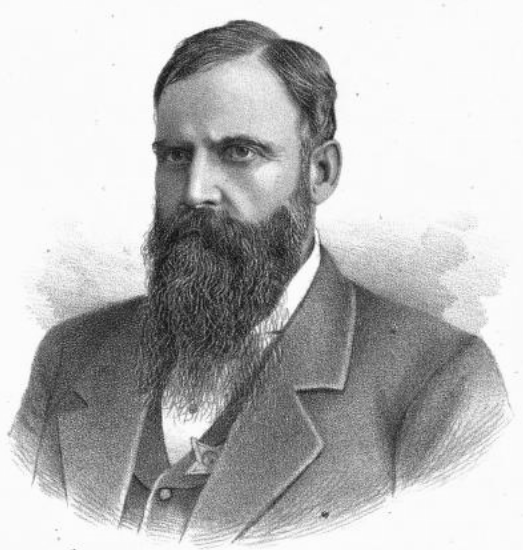

Cook County Sheriff
- In office 1880–1882
- Preceded by: John Hoffman
- Succeeded by: Seth Hanchett

Cook County Coroner
- In office 1878–1880
- Preceded by: Emil Dietzsch
- Succeeded by: Canute R. Matson

Member of the Illinois House of Representatives
- In office 1874–1876

Collector of Internal Revenue for the First District of Illinois
- In office June 26, 1866 – June 18, 1868
- Appointed by: Andrew Johnson
- Preceded by: George Schneider
- Succeeded by: John M. Corse

Personal details
- Born: November 25, 1833 Chardon, Ohio, US
- Died: December 13, 1908 (aged 75) Oak Park, Illinois, US
- Resting place: Rosehill Cemetery; Chicago, Illinois, US
- Education: University of Michigan

Military service
- Allegiance: United States of America; Union
- Branch/service: United States Army
- Years of service: 1861–1865
- Rank: Lieutenant Colonel; Bvt. Brigadier General
- Unit: 39th Illinois Infantry Regiment
- Commands: 1st Brigade, 1st Division, XXIV Corps
- Battles/wars: American Civil War: First Battle of Kernstown; Fort Wagner; Battle of Drewry's Bluff

Orrin Lorentna Mann (November 25, 1833 – December 13, 1908) was an American soldier and politician who served as an officer in the Union Army during the American Civil War. Born in Ohio, Mann struggled to find gainful employment in his early years and made two abortive attempts to gain a university education. While in Chicago, Illinois, Mann raised a regiment, the 39th Illinois Volunteer Infantry Regiment, which deployed in late 1861. Mann led the unit through the First Battle of Kernstown and Siege of Fort Wagner before sustaining an injury while leading at the Battle of Drewry's Bluff. During this latter engagement, Mann was promoted to brigadier general. He spent most of the rest of the war as the Provost Marshal of Norfolk, Virginia. After the war, Mann held a series of political offices in Illinois including as a member of the Illinois House of Representatives (1874–1876) and Cook County Sheriff (1880–1882).

== Biography ==
Orrin Lorentna Mann was born in Chardon, Ohio, on November 25, 1833. Two of his grandfathers served in the Revolutionary War. Mann helped on the family farm until he was twenty years old. At that age, Mann decided to learn a trade to better support himself. After a year apprenticing as a blacksmith in Ann Arbor, Michigan, Mann suffered an injury that forced him to abandon the study. Living in the same city as the University of Michigan, Mann decided to turn his attention to academics. He studied at Albion College for two years, but was forced to leave due to his lack of resources.

Mann then turned his attention west, moving to Chicago, Illinois, in 1853. A private school allowed him to study until his was able to secure the resources to the University of Michigan. He left in his junior year due to poor health, returning to Chicago in 1861. He sought a trade, but with the outbreak of the Civil War, Mann decided instead to raise a regiment for the Union Army. His regiment became the 39th Illinois Volunteer Infantry Regiment and Mann was given the rank of captain. However, Illinois had already met its troop quota and could not deploy units without Congressional approval. Mann petitioned President Abraham Lincoln to deploy the regiment, and the unit finally saw action after the First Battle of Bull Run. Mann was promoted to Major of his "Yates Phalanx", nicknamed after Governor of Illinois Richard Yates.

The 39th was tasked with guarding the Baltimore and Ohio Railroad. On January 2, 1862, the company met Major General Stonewall Jackson's Valley District Army (15,000 soldiers), but managed to retreat after a skirmish. Mann's decision making during the retreat earned him a promotion to lieutenant colonel. He served on the staff of General Alpheus S. Williams until leaving to join his regiment at the First Battle of Kernstown. The unit then moved to South Carolina and the 39th took part in the Siege of Fort Wagner; Mann sent the announcement of its capture to General Quincy Adams Gillmore.

Mann spent the next winter in Chicago Union Army recruiting office; recruits were sent to fill the ranks of the 39th. In 1864 the regiment was reassigned to the Army of the James under Colonel Thomas O. Osborn. Mann assumed Osborn's duties after he was injured at the Battle of Drewry's Bluff. The 39th made an advance against a Confederate defensive position and captured a brigadier general. For his actions, Mann himself was brevetted brigadier general.

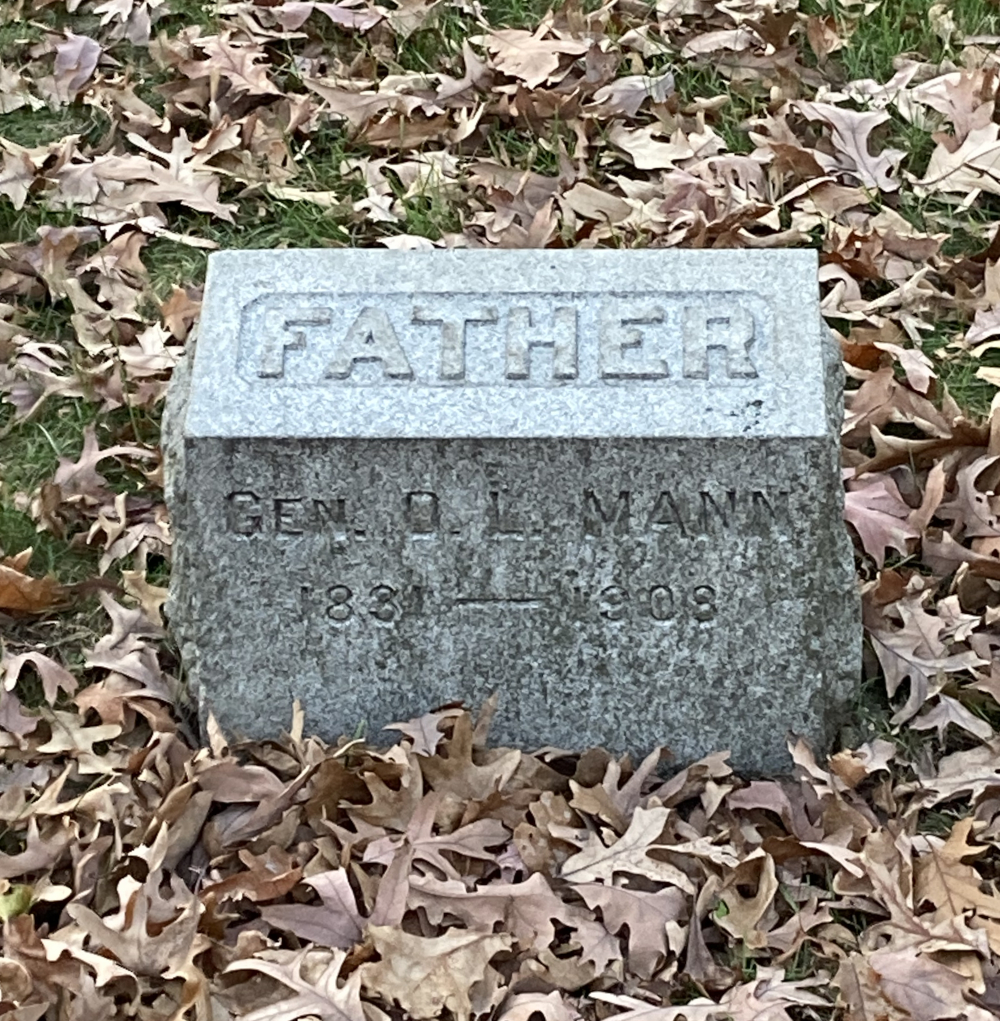
Mann's grave at Rosehill Cemetery

A gunshot wound to his leg sustained at Drewry's Bluff kept Mann hospitalized until autumn. Upon his return to action, he was named Provost Marshal of the District of Eastern Virginia. Mann was responsible for the administration of the city of Norfolk, Virginia, and the Norfolk Military Prison. After the Union captured Richmond, Virginia, state military rule was abolished. For his work in Norfolk, Mann was promoted to a full colonel (although he did not officially accept the position) and he was ordered to return to his command of the 39th. However, after anarchy engulfed in the city in the following weeks, Major General Alfred Terry reassigned Mann to Norfolk with four regiments at his command.

Mann and the 39th were mustered out of service on December 16, 1865. Upon his return, he was named Collector of Internal Revenue for the First District of Illinois. He also became involved with brickmaking. Mann served one term in the Illinois House of Representatives as a Republican from 1874 to 1876. He served as Cook County Coroner from 1878 to 1880, then as Cook County Sheriff from 1880 to 1882. He died in Oak Park, Illinois, on December 13, 1908, and was buried in Chicago in Rosehill Cemetery.

Preceded by George Schneider	Collector of Internal Revenue for the 1st District of Illinois; 1866–1868	Succeeded by John M. Corse
