= Des Plaines crater =

Impact crater in the United States

Coordinates: 42°3′N 87°52′W

- Location within the United States Location within Illinois
- Location: Illinois, Des Plaines, Illinois, USA

Impact crater structure
- Diameter: 8 kilometres (5.0 mi)
- Age: <280 Ma
- Exposed: No
- Drilled: Yes

The Des Plaines crater or Des Plaines disturbance is recognized as an impact crater in Cook County, Illinois, United States. It is located beneath the eastern part of the city of Des Plaines, which is a suburb of Chicago.

The Des Plaines crater is 5.5 miles (8.9 km) in diameter and covers an area of approximately 25 square miles (65 km^{2}). The age of the crater is unknown but is thought to be between 280 million years and 2 million years (Permian or younger). The crater is buried beneath 75 to 200 feet (23–60 m) of glacial till and can only be seen as a series of faults and deformations in well logs and seismic surveys. Faulting in the structure has produced as much as 600 feet (180 m) of vertical displacement. Subsurface strata of Cambrian through Pennsylvanian age has been faulted and tilted by the event. The anomalous area was first noted by water well drillers in 1893, who noted an absence of water in a 1,600-foot (490 m) deep well. Prior to being recognized as an impact structure, the feature was referred to as a cryptoexplosion structure or cryptovolcanic structure, as were several others in the Midwestern United States. The upfaulted central portion and the presence of shatter cone structures support the impact origin.
