= 39th Illinois Infantry Regiment =

39th Regiment Illinois Volunteer Infantry "Yates' Phalanx"
- Illinois state flag
- Active: 1861–1865
- Country: United States
- Allegiance: Union
- Branch: Infantry
- Engagements: Battle of Kernstown; Siege of Fort Wagner; Bermuda Hundred Campaign; Battle of Drewry's Bluff; Siege of Petersburg; Appomattox Campaign

The 39th Regiment Illinois Volunteer Infantry, nicknamed "Yates' Phalanx," was an infantry regiment that served in the Union Army during the American Civil War.

== Service ==
The 39th Illinois Infantry was organized at Chicago, Illinois, and was mustered into service on October 11, 1861, for a three-year term. The regiment was mustered out on December 6, 1865.

== Adjutant General's Report ==
The organization of this regiment was commenced as soon as the news of the firing on Fort Sumter reached Chicago.

General T. O. Osborn was one of its contemplated field officers, and labored zealously to get it accepted under the first call for troops, but did not accomplish his object. The state having filled its quota without this regiment, efforts were made to get it accepted into the State service of Missouri, but without success. The regiment had already assumed the name of His Excellency, the governor of Illinois, and was known as the "Yates Phalanx". Governor Yates manifested an earnest desire to see it brought into the service, and sent General O. L. Mann (then known as Captain) to Washington, with strong commendatory letters to the president and secretary of war, urging the acceptance of the regiment, which at this time had over 800 men on the rolls.

The regiment was accepted on the day succeeding the first Bull Run disaster, and Austin Light, of Chicago, was appointed colonel; and under his direction the organization was completed, and left Camp Mather, Chicago, on the morning of October 13, 1861. The day previous to the departure, a beautiful stand of colors was presented to the regiment by Miss Helen Arion, daughter of Colonel Arion. It had also won a handsome flag at a prize drill, under the auspices of the Illinois Agricultural Society, then in session at Chicago.

On leaving Chicago, the regiment reported to Brigadier General Curtis, at Camp Benton, St. Louis, Missouri.

October 29, the regiment received orders to proceed to Williamsport, Maryland, where it was fully armed and equipped. December 11, it pressed on to Hancock, Maryland, at which point it crossed the Potomac River, and was distributed in detachments along the Baltimore and Ohio Railroad, to assist in guarding that important line of transit.

January 3, 1862, the advance of a rebel force 15,000 strong, under command of "Stonewall" Jackson, attacked Companies D, I and K, in the command of Major Mann, near Bath, Virginia, and, after a brisk little fight, were repulsed; then, with two pieces of artillery, and a liberal display of strategy and courage, the enemy was held in check for nearly twenty-four hours. Company G, under command of Captain Slaughter, was also attacked at Great Cacapon Bridge, but repulsed the enemy with considerable loss. A heavy force was approaching, and this Company, not being able to ford the Potomac, retreated up the railroad to Cumberland, Maryland. Colonel Osborn, with the remaining portion of the regiment, was simultaneously attacked at Alpine Station. Companies C and F, in command of Captain Munn, drew into ambush about five hundred (500) of Ashby's Cavalry, and, after killing and wounding 30, routed them. The regiment finally forded the Potomac, sustaining no serious loss, except in the matter of camp and garrison equipage, and took up a new position on the Maryland shore.

Cumberland was at this period, threatened, and the Thirty-ninth was ordered to make a forced march of forty (40) miles, over terrible roads, which was accomplished in the short space of eighteen hours. From Cumberland the regiment was ordered to New Creek, Virginia, to guard a bridge, and was here assigned to the First Brigade of General Lander's division, and was soon ordered to Patterson's Creek, below Cumberland. At this period the regiment suffered seriously from sickness, occasioned by constant exposure and excessive duty. The weather was intensely cold, and cattle cars were the only quarters to be had for the command. But the men endured these hardships for over two months with scarcely a murmur, notwithstanding their comrades were almost daily dying around them. These days and weeks will ever be remembered as being more terrible than were those in which the enemy was confronted on the battle-field. From Patterson's Creek the Thirty-ninth to the advance, protecting the workmen in repairing the Baltimore and Ohio Railroad to Martinsburg. The regiment, from Martinsburg, participated in a reconnaissance to Strasburg, and, on its return, took part in the brilliant fight at Winchester, March 23, 1862, that resulted in the utter defeat of "Stonewall" Jackson's forces. The regiment suffered but little during the engagement, owing to its position, which was the extreme left. The ensuing day it took the advance in pursuing the enemy down the Shenandoah Valley, as far as New Market, where it was detached and sent into the Luray Valley, to protect bridges over the South Branch of the Shenandoah River.

Major S. W. Munn, in command of four companies, met a small cavalry force at Columbia Bridge, and, after a brisk skirmish, dislodged the enemy, putting out the fire which they had applied to the structure, and capturing thirty (30) prisoners.

The Thirty-ninth left the Valley the 1st of May 1862, with Shield's division, and making a continued march of one hundred and fifty (150) miles, reported to General McDowell at Fredericksburg. After one day's rest, the news of General Bank's defeat in the Valley arrived, and the regiment was ordered back to the Valley, making forced marches over a distance of one hundred and eighty miles. After a few days' rest, the regiment was ordered to Alexandria, Virginia, and immediately embarked on transports for the James River, and reached Harrison's Landing in time to take part in the closing scenes of General McClellan's seven days fight and seven nights retreat. While at Harrison's Landing, the regiment was kept at the front, on picket duty, and had a series of unimportant skirmishes, until about the middle of August, when it participated in the second Malvern Hill fight, but without material injury. From this point a number of officers and men were sent away sick.

The regiment was here assigned to the First Brigade, Peck's division, Keyes' Corps, and retreated with the army to Fort Monroe. September 1, it was sent to Suffolk, Virginia, where it remained for the space of three months, fortifying the place, and making frequent expeditions to the Blackwater, where heavy skirmishes frequently occurred. On one occasion it participated in the capture of two pieces of artillery and forty prisoners.

At Suffolk, about the 1st of December, Major S. W. Munn resigned, on account of ill health, and returned home.

On the 23, January 1863, the regiment broke camp, and marched a distance of seventy-five miles, to the Chowan River, where it took transports, and reported to General Foster, at Newbern, North Carolina. Colonel T. O. Osborn was her placed in command of the First Brigade, O. S. Ferry's Division of Foster's Corps. A beautiful flag was here presented to the regiment, from His Excellency, Governor Yates, being his portrait, and which was carried through all the subsequent battles of the Thirty-ninth.

On January 20, 1863, the regiment again embarked, accompanying General Foster's expedition to Hilton Head, South Carolina. It remained in camp on St. Helena Island, South Carolina, for several weeks, where a opportunity for drill and discipline was taken advantage of. An experienced inspecting officer here paid the Thirty-ninth a flattering compliment, by pronouncing it the best drilled and the best equipped Regiment in the division.

The 1st of April, the regiment took part in General Hunter's expedition against Charleston, and, after landing on Folly Island, took a prominent part in the erection of batteries with which Morris Island was taken.

The regiment was next ordered on to Morris Island, where it was assigned to General Alfred H. Terry's division, and again worked zealously and long in the trenches, parallels and forts which resulted in the final capture of Fort Wagner. A day or two previous to the fall of this fort, Colonel Osborn was temporarily disabled by the premature discharge of a heavy piece of ordnance. The regiment formed the advance of their Brigade, temporarily commanded by Lieutenant Colonel Mann, and occupied the trenches on the night that it was discovered the fort was being evacuated. As soon as this fact was known, Thirty-ninth entered the fort, captured the enemy's rear-guard, cut several fuses were laid with the design to blow up the structure on the approach of Union troops, and planted the Regimental colors on the parapet some two hours before the time appointed for the general charge.

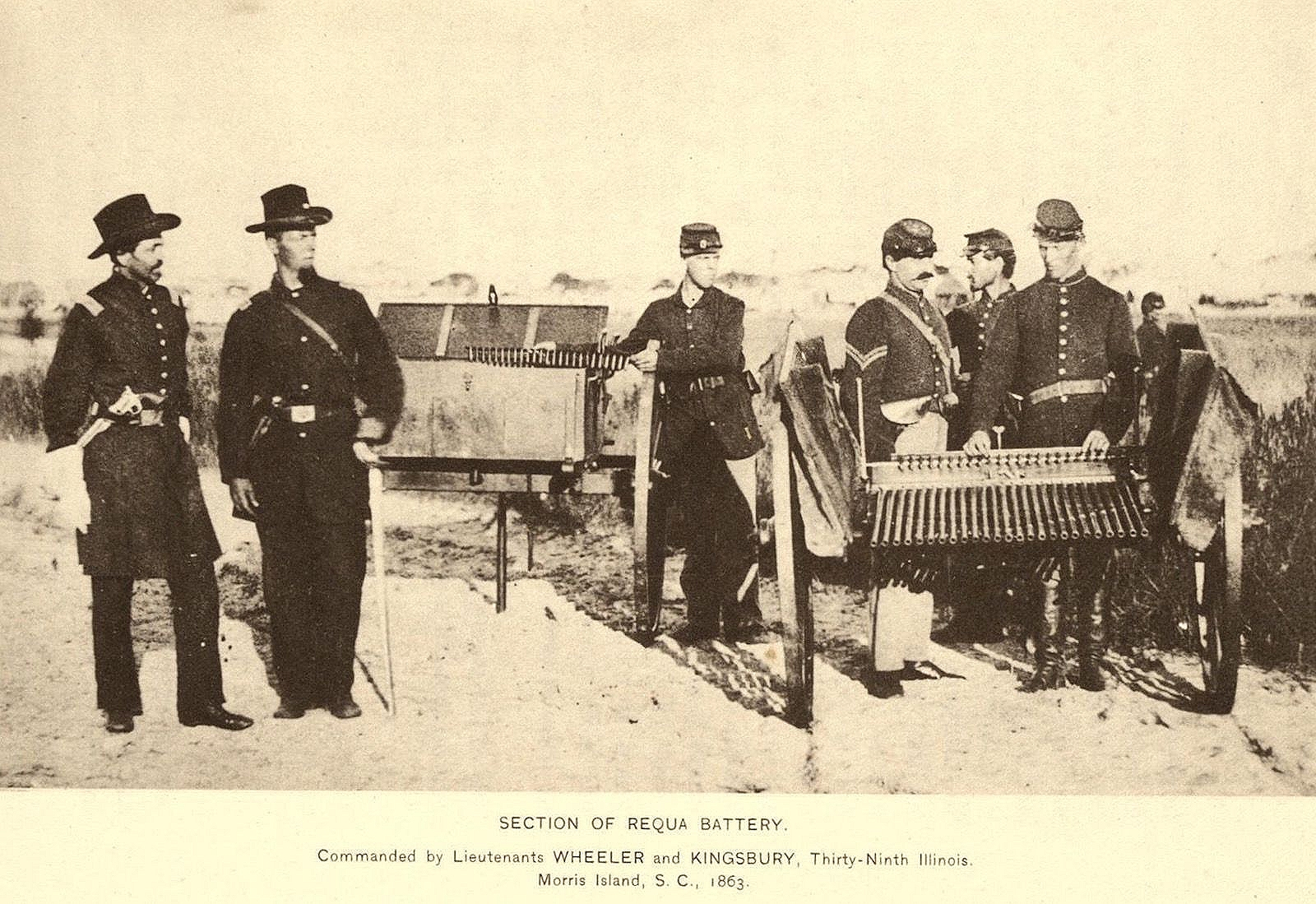
The 39th Illinois at Morris Island, S.C., with a Billinghurst Requa Battery gun

== Companies and county of origins ==
Company A - Will and Cook Counties
Company B - McLean County
Company C - Livingston and Cook Counties
Company D - Ogle and DeWitt Counties
Company E - Will and Cook Counties
Company F - Cook and Lake Counties
Company G - Cook and Will Counties
Company H - Cook County
Company I - DeWitt and Boone Counties
Company K - LaSalle, McLean, and Cook Counties

== Total strength and casualties ==
The regiment suffered 12 officers and 129 enlisted men who were killed in action or who died of their wounds and 2 officers and 130 enlisted men who died of disease, for a total of 273 fatalities

== Members ==
The regiment's commanders were:

- Colonel Austin Light - dismissed on November 25, 1861
- Colonel Thomas O. Osborn - promoted to brigadier general on May 11, 1865
- Lieutenant Colonel Orrin L. Mann - mustered out with the regiment

Two men earned the Medal of Honor while serving with the regiment. Private Henry M. Hardenbergh of Company G received the medal posthumously for his actions at the Second Battle of Deep Bottom on August 16, 1864, and Corporal Abner P. Allen of Company K was awarded the medal for his service as a color bearer at the Third Battle of Petersburg on April 2, 1865.

== See also ==
- Illinois in the American Civil War
- List of Illinois Civil War Units
- Lamon's Brigade
