= Abner P. Allen =

United States Army Medal of Honor recipient (1839–1905)

- Abner P. Allen, Medal of Honor recipient
- Born: October 9, 1839; Woodford County, Illinois, U.S.
- Died: August 22, 1905 (aged 65)
- Military career
- Allegiance: United States of America; Union
- Branch: United States Army; Union Army
- Service years: 1864–1865
- Rank: Corporal
- Unit: 39th Illinois Volunteer Infantry Regiment
- Conflicts: American Civil War
- Awards: Medal of Honor

Abner P. Allen (October 9, 1839 – August 22, 1905) was an American soldier who received the Medal of Honor for valor during the American Civil War.

== Biography ==
Allen was born in Woodford County, Illinois. He joined the 39th Illinois infantry Regiment from Bloomington, Illinois, in January 1864, and mustered out with his regiment on December 6, 1865.

By the time the 39th was involved in the Siege of Petersburg, Virginia, Allen was a corporal in Company K. When the regiment (as part of the XXIV Corps under Major General John Gibbon) was assaulting Fort Gregg on April 2, 1865, under heavy fire, he was at the front as a color bearer.

At the surrender ceremony at Appomattox Courthouse a week later, Allen was given the honor of carrying Illinois' flag. He later traveled to Washington, D.C., with General Gibbon and 76 captured Confederate colors. He received his medal there from Secretary of War Edwin Stanton.

Allen died in 1905 and is buried in Centerburg Cemetery, Centerburg, Ohio.

== Medal of Honor citation ==
Rank and organization: Corporal, Company K, 39th Illinois Infantry. Place and date: At Petersburg, Virginia, April 2, 1865. Entered service at: Bloomington, Illinois. Birth: Woodford County, Illinois. Date of issue: May 12, 1865.

Citation:

Gallantry as color bearer in the assault on Fort Gregg.

== See also ==
- List of American Civil War Medal of Honor recipients: A–F
