= John E. Traeger =

American politician (1859–1946)

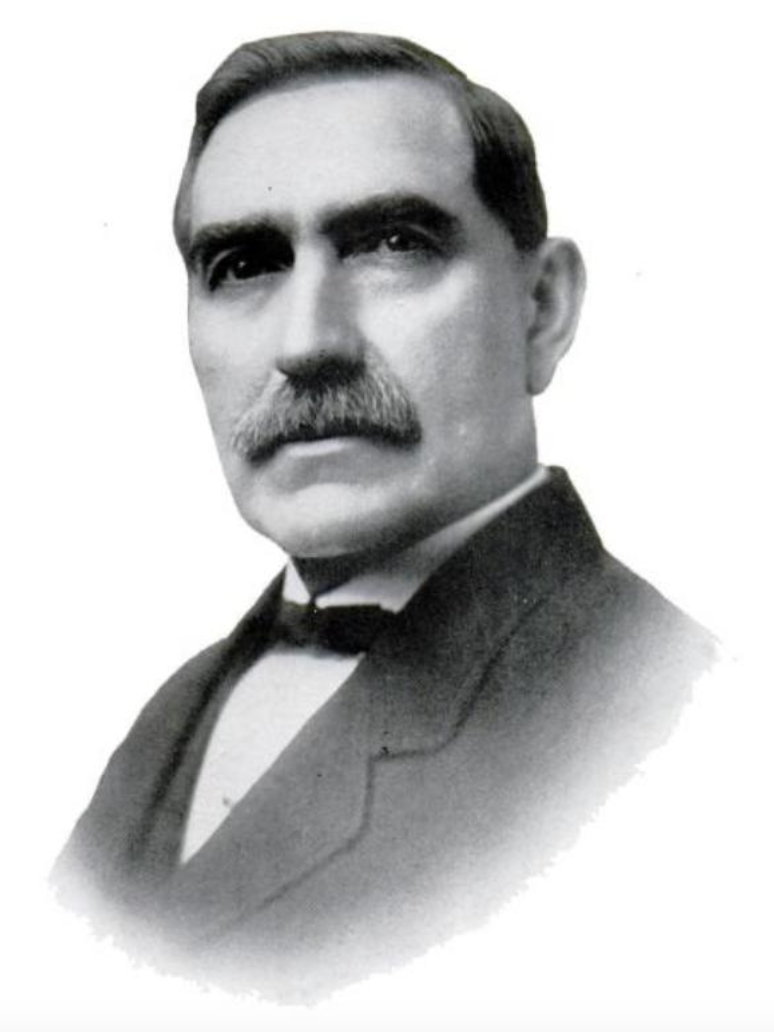
- Traeger in 1920

Cook County Sheriff
- In office December 3, 1928 – December 1930
- Preceded by: Charles E. Graydon
- Succeeded by: William D. Meyering
- In office December 1914 – December 1918
- Preceded by: Michael Zimmer
- Succeeded by: Charles W. Peters

Chicago City Comptroller
- In office April 1911 – December 1914
- Preceded by: Walter W. Wilson
- Succeeded by: Michael Zimmer

Chicago City Treasurer
- In office April 1907 – April 1911
- Preceded by: Fred W. Blocki
- Succeeded by: Isaac N. Powell

Chicago City Collector
- In office June 1905 – March 1907
- Preceded by: Edward M. Lahiff
- Succeeded by: Ernest J. Magerstadt

Cook County Coroner
- In office December 1900 – December 1904
- Preceded by: George Berz
- Succeeded by: Peter M. Hoffman

Lake, Illinois Town Collector
- In office 1897–1899

Personal details
- Born: November 13, 1859
- Died: October 16, 1946 (aged 86) Chicago, Illinois, US
- Political party: Democratic

John Edward Traeger (November 13, 1859 – October 16, 1946) was an American politician who served as Cook County Sheriff, Cook County Coroner, and Chicago City Treasurer. He also served as Chicago city comptroller, Chicago city collector, Lake, Illinois city collector, and as a member of the Cook County Jury Commission.

== Early life ==
Traeger was born November 13, 1859, and was educated in Chicago Public Schools. In 1884, he got married. Beginning in the late 1880s, Traeger began residing on Chicago's South Side, later becoming employed in the pork meatpacking business. In 1904, he became vice president of the newly organized Stockmen's Trust and Savings Bank, a job that he would hold for decades.

== Politics ==
Being elected in 1897 and reelected in 1898 and 1899, Traeger served as the town collector for Lake Township, Cook County, Illinois, from 1897 through 1899.

In 1900, with the backing of Carter Harrison IV and Robert E. Burke, Traeger was nominated by the Democratic Party for the Cook County coroner election. He was the only Democrat to win election to a countywide office that year. He took office in December 1900.

On December 30, 1903, the county saw great tragedy when the Iroquois Theatre caught fire, killing more than 600 people. Traeger arrived at the theater soon after the fire had started, and would work throughout the following night to remove deceased and injured victims from the building. As coroner, he was responsible for the inquest into the fire. The day after the fire, Traeger empaneled a jury. The formal inquest was launched January 7, 1904, being held in the chambers of the Chicago City Council. It lasted 29 days. Traeger played a role in the introduction of safety measures such as steel curtains for theaters and a role mandating that fire escape doors must be unlocked.

Other deadly disasters that occurred in Cook County during his tenure as coroner included the St. Luke's Sanitarium fire and the 1904 Doremus train wreck.

In 1904, Traeger was nominated for reelection as treasurer. His Republican opponent was Peter M. Hoffman, who was a very popular politician. Traeger lost the 1904 election to Hoffman by a broad 60,000 margin.

In June 1905, Mayor Edward Fitzsimmons Dunne appointed Trager as Chicago city collector. Traeger held this position through March 1907.

During his tenure, he unsuccessfully sought the Democratic nomination for Cook County sheriff in 1906. Instead, James J. Gray received the nomination at the Democratic Party's county convention.

In April 1907, Traeger was elected Chicago city treasurer. He was the only Democratic nominee to win a citywide office in that year's Chicago municipal elections. Traeger, one of the county's most popular German American figures, was seen as benefiting from the support of the same German American electorate that overwhelmingly supported Republican Fred A. Busse in the coinciding mayoral election. Notably, after the 1907 municipal elections, the offices of mayor, city treasurer, county coroner, and county sheriff all became held by German Americans. Trager's Republican opponent in the 1908 treasurer election had been considered a weak candidate.

The Chicago Tribune would later credit him as being the first Chicago city treasurer, "to collect interest for the order to benefit of the various pension funds".

In the 1911 Chicago mayoral election, Trager backed Carter Harrison IV in his successful Democratic primary election challenge to the incumbent Dunne.

After Harrison became mayor again, having won the 1911 mayoral general election, he appointed Traeger as Chicago city comptroller.

Traeger considered either running for mayor in 1915, or for Cook County Treasurer in 1914. He instead, successfully, ran for Cook County Sheriff as the Democratic nominee.

Trager left office as Sheriff in 1918, but he would return to that office ten years later. In the interim period, he remained involved in government and politics. Traeger was a delegate to the 1920 Illinois constitutional convention. In 1923, mayor William Emmett Dever appointed Traeger to Chicago's zoning appeal board. He retained this position until his 1928 election to another term as sheriff.

In 1928, Traeger won the special election for Cook County sheriff. He won the Democratic nomination, running unopposed in the primary. In the general election, he defeated Republican nominee George H. Weideling. This made Traeger the first person to be elected to two terms as Cook County sheriff.

Trager took his oath of office on November 28, 1928, but did not formally take office until 10:30 on December 3, 1928.

After taking office, he hired his son John Ernest Traeger as assistant sheriff.

Traeger encountered a scandal when Cook County judges, including John P. McGoorty, advised him against continuing with patronage hires he had been undertaking, replacing county jail employees with inexperienced political hires. He left office in December 1930.

Traeger was appointed to fill a vacancy on the Cook County Jury Commission, taking office on January 25, 1935. He was immediately made chairman of the committee. He would serve four terms, holding the office until his death. At the end of his tenure, he was the oldest individual serving as a Cook County official.

== Personal life and death ==
Traeger's son, John Ernest Traeger, served 18 years as a member of the Cook County Board of Commissioners, as well two years on the Cook County Board of Assessors, Cook County assistant sheriff (during Traeger's second term as Cook County Sheriff), and a stint as chief deputy clerk of the Cook County Superior Court.

On October 3, 1946, while boarding a Halsted Street streetcar at 55th street, Traeger fell, suffering lacerations to his scalp. He received treatment at Chicago's Evangelical Hospital, and was released from the hospital. However, his condition worsened, and he would die there on October 16, 1946, aged 88.
