= John Stephens (Illinois politician) =

American politician

Coroner of Cook County
- In office 1870–1874
- Preceded by: Benjamin L. Cleaves
- Succeeded by: Emil Dietzsch

Personal details
- Born: September 16, 1840 Albany, New York
- Spouse: Emma Morton (m. 1871–1883) (her death)

John Stephens (June 25, 1835 – unknown) was an American politician who was twice elected as Coroner of Cook County on the Republican ticket. Born to a German American family in Albany, New York, Stephens moved to Chicago with his family when he was four years of age. Prior to his political career, he served in the Chicago Fire Department and as a Sergeant in the Union Army.

In November 1877, Stephens was elected clerk of the Criminal Court of Cook County.
