= Prairie Wolf Slough =

Protected area in Illinois, United States

Coordinates: 42°11′41″N 87°51′12″W

The Prairie Wolf Slough, officially known as Prairie Wolf Forest Preserve, is a forest preserve in Deerfield, Illinois, just north of Deerfield High School. The name refers to the Native American name of early Deerfield and Jefferson Park pioneer John Kinzie Clark which was nonimoa, or prairie wolf in English. The preserve is 431 acres (1.7 km^{2}) and contains 2 miles (3 km) of trails. Since 1994, the slough has been routinely burned to allow for more native plants and animals to inhabit it and to prevent overgrowth. The land was purchased by the government in the 1970s and today is used by the nearby high school and surrounding corporate offices as a place for recreation.

LeAnn Spencer of the Chicago Tribune described the slough as "an important 20-acre wetlands-restoration project" in 1995. In 1998, there was a volunteer cleanup effort at the slough as part of the annual Chicago River Rescue Day, sponsored by the Friends of the Chicago River. The same year, a pedestrian and cycling path was approved to connect the slough to Deerfield High School, which had opened by 2000. The preserve also has a dog park.
