= Peter M. Hoffman =

American politician (died 1948)

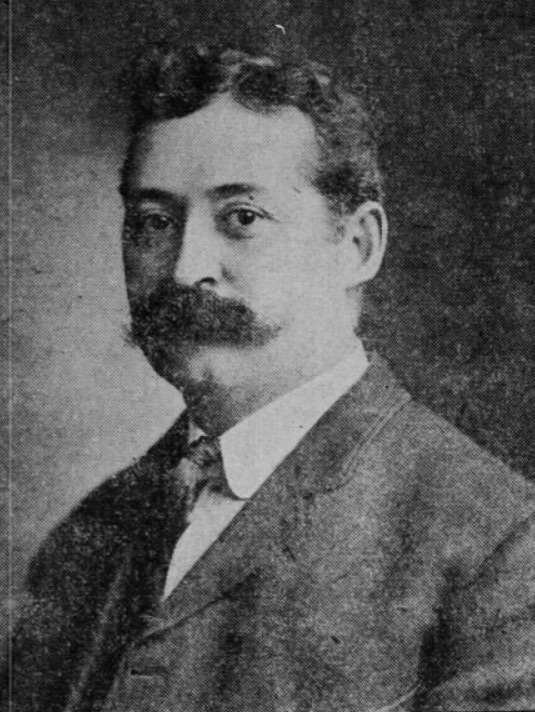
- Hoffman circa 1904

Cook County Sheriff
- In office December 1922 – December 26, 1926
- Preceded by: Charles W. Peters
- Succeeded by: Charles E. Graydon

Cook County Coroner
- In office December 1904 – December 1922
- Preceded by: John E. Traeger
- Succeeded by: Oscar Wolff

Member of the Cook County Board of Commissioners from Suburban Cook County
- In office December 1898 – December 1904

Personal details
- Born: Des Plaines, Illinois
- Died: July 30, 1948 (aged 85) Evanston, Illinois
- Party: Republican

Peter M. Hoffman was an American politician who served as Cook County Sheriff, Cook County Coroner, and as a member of the Cook County Board of Commissioners. His political career ended after a corruption scandal arose during his term as Cook County Sheriff. He was a member of the Republican Party.

== Early life ==
Hoffman was born in Des Plaines, Illinois, where he would continue to live during his adulthood.

== Career ==
Hoffman worked as a grocer and a railroad clerk. He was the chief clerk of the Chicago and North Western Railway.

He served as president of the Village of Desplaines Board of Trustees.

=== Cook County Commissioner ===
Elected in 1898, and reelected in both 1900 and 1902, Hoffman served as a Republican member of the Cook County Board of Commissioners, elected from suburban Cook County.

=== Cook County Coroner ===
In 1904, Hoffman was elected Cook County Coroner as a Republican, and was reelected in 1908, 1912, 1916, and 1920.

As coroner, he established the county's first "chemical laboratory", and appointed experienced pathologists and chemists. He was aggressive at prosecuting certain types of homicide, centering his political image on fighting to guard the innocent. Hoffman would even resort to stacking inquest juries in order to increase the likelihood of particular suspects being charged with homicide.

In the aftermath of the Eastland disaster, Hoffman convened a jury within hours to help to determine accountability for the deaths. He also secured the Second Regiment Armory to use a central morgue for the victims of the disaster.

He resigned the office of Cook County coroner in 1922 to assume the position of Cook County sheriff.

=== Cook County Sheriff ===
In 1922, Hoffman was elected Cook County sheriff, having run on a "reform" platform. He pledged to "clean up" the administration of the Cook County Jail.

Hoffman retained Wesley Westbrook as the warden of Cook County Jail. Westbrook had been hired by Hoffman's predecessor, Charles W. Peters.

A major scandal arose when it came out that Hoffman had been giving special privileged to Valley Gang prohibition gangsters Terry Druggan and Frankie Lake while they were prisoners at Cook County Jail. Relating to this, Hoffman and his jail warden, Westbrook, were charged with contempt of court by James H. Wilkerson, and Hoffman spent 30 days in jail and was fined $2,500 while Westbrook spent four months in jail. After several appeals attempts failed, Hoffman spent prison time while in office as Sheriff.

In 1925, after the scandal involving the favoritism to mobsters in the Cook County Jail had already broke, Hoffman appointed George H. Weideling as the new warden of the jail. Weideling would resign after eight months after Judge John P. McGoorty, in his investigation of the jail's conditions, opined that, despite Weideling being honest, there was a "deplorable lack of morale and a breakdown of discipline in the institution".

Hoffman remained in office after his term would have normally expired in early December 1926 due to the fact that his elected successor, Patrick J. Carr, died before he could take office (the law stated that a sheriff served until his successor qualified to take office). Hoffman would resign in late December 1926, effective on December 26.

=== Post-political career ===
Hoffman worked on the construction service of the Forest Preserve District of Cook County, a job he left in 1932. Before retiring in his later years, he ran an automobile sales agency.

== Death ==
Hoffman died July 30, 1948, at Saint Francis Hospital of Evanston in Evanston, Illinois. at the age of 85
