= Susan Regis =

Chef and restaurateur

Susan Regis is a chef and restaurateur in the Boston area. She is a New Hampshire native.

== Career ==
Regis's first culinary job was at the restaurant Seasons in the Bostonian Hotel. When Lydia Shire opened Biba, she was there as sous-chef for four years. While at Biba, Regis was named Best Chef in the Northeast, 1998 by James Beard. She went on to work at Upstairs On the Square in Harvard Square. With René Becker, she opened Shepard, also in Cambridge, Massachusetts. She was nominated for two more James Beard Best Chef Northeast awards.

Regis also worked with Shire at the Los Angeles Four Seasons Hotel in the 1980s.

She appeared on a 2017 episode of Simply Ming.

Regis, speaking of Shepard, has said, "If it weren’t for Julia Child, we wouldn’t be here."
