= Henry M. Hardenbergh =

- Born: c. 1843; Noble County, Indiana
- Died: August 28, 1864; Petersburg, Virginia
- Burial place: Poplar Grove National Cemetery, Petersburg VA
- Military career
- Allegiance: United States of America
- Branch: United States Army
- Service years: 1861-1864
- Rank: Private[Lt USCT (Commission not received)]
- Unit: 39th Illinois Veteran Volunteer Infantry
- Conflicts: Civil War: Jackson's Valley Campaign; Second Battle of Deep Bottom; Siege of Petersburg
- Awards: Medal of Honor

Henry M. Hardenbergh was a veteran of the American Civil War and a recipient of the Medal of Honor.

== Biography ==
Hardenbergh was born in Noble County, Indiana. He later moved to Tinley Park, Illinois and worked at a store. Little else is known about Hardenbergh's early life.

Hardenbergh joined the Union army on August 15, 1861. He was tasked with manning the requa, a primitive type of rapid fire artillery. In 1862, he fought against soldiers under the command of Confederate General "Stonewall" Jackson during Jackson's Valley Campaign. In 1863, he participated in the Siege of Charleston. In January 1864, Hardenbergh's enlistment ended, although he reenlisted following a brief furlough home.

== Second Battle of Deep Bottom ==
On August 16, 1864, Hardenbergh and the 39th Illinois Veteran Volunteer Infantry took part in a 200-yard charge on Confederate fortifications in Henrico County, Virginia. Hardenbergh, who was carrying his regiments colors, but continued advancing after passing the flag onto another soldier. After breaching the Confederate fortifications, Hardenberg engaged in hand-to-hand combat with the color bearer of the 10th Alabama Infantry. He was left severely injured, but he successfully captured the flag.

Following the battle, Hardenbergh presented the captured flag to Union General David B. Birney. Birney recommended Hardenbergh for the Medal of Honor and a lieutenant's commission in the 36th U.S. Colored Troops.

== Citation ==
Capture of flag. He was wounded in the shoulder during this action. He was killed in action at Petersburg on 28 August 1864.

== Death ==
Hardenbergh was killed by a Confederate sniper on August 28, 1864, while on picket duty during the Siege of Petersburg. He never received his officer's commission, and his Medal of Honor was awarded posthumously. He now rests at Poplar Grove Cemetery near Petersburg, Virginia.

== Legacy ==
On August 16, 1995, a marker was erected by Bremen Township near Richmond, Virginia, near where Hardenbergh fought during the Second Battle of Deep Bottom. The marker was placed to commemorate Hardenbergh.

== See also ==
- Jackson's Valley Campaign
- Second Battle of Deep Bottom
- Siege of Petersburg
