= John Kinzie Clark =

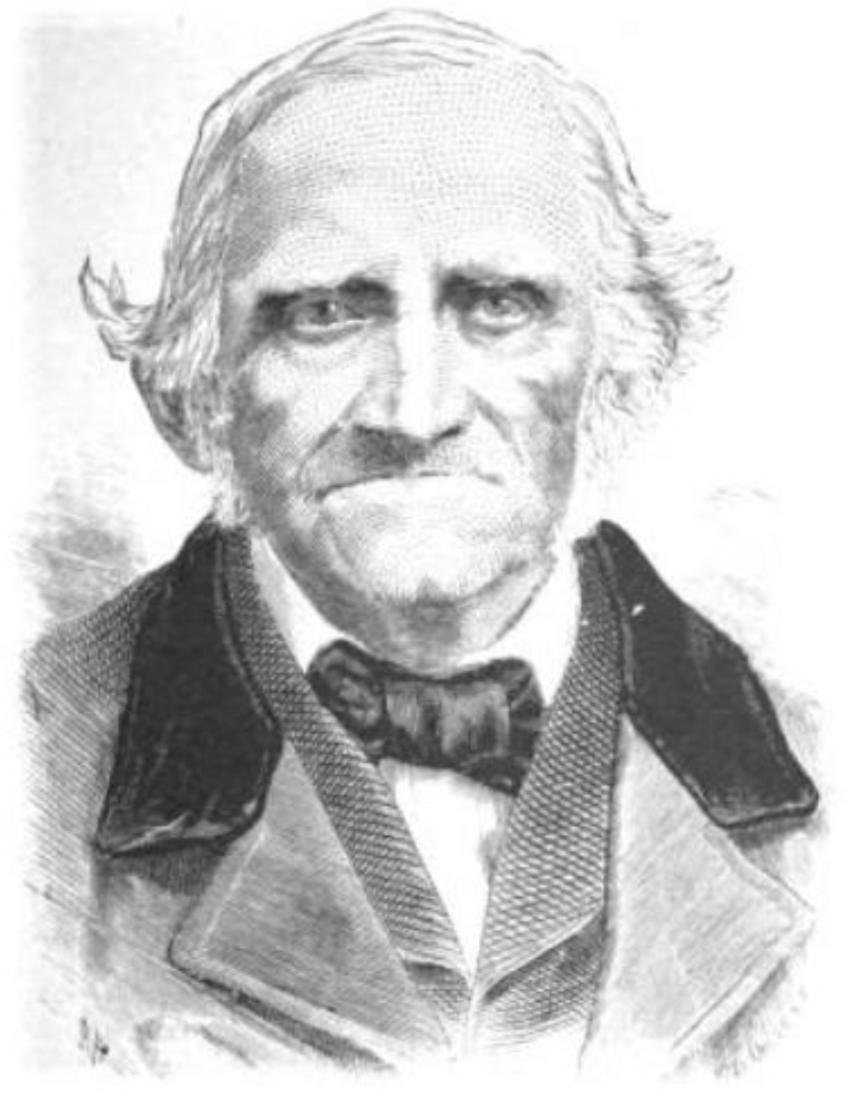

Coroner of Cook County
- In office 1831–1832
- Preceded by: Office established
- Succeeded by: Elijah Wentworth

Personal details
- Born: 1792
- Died: September 19, 1865 (aged 72–73) Deerfield, Illinois, US
- Resting place: Deerfield Cemetery

John Kinzie Clark (1792–1865) was a trader, trapper and a prominent early settler in the Chicago area.

== Biography ==
Clark's grave at Deerfield Cemetery

Clark was raised by Native Americans, who called him Nonimoa or Prairie Wolf. Clark first arrived at Fort Dearborn in 1818. In 1830, Clark settled in the vicinity of today's Jefferson Park area where he built a log cabin on the prairie. Hired to carry mail by horseback between Chicago and Milwaukee, he would make stops in Deerfield with provisions for early settlers there. Clark eventually moved to Deerfield.

In April 1831, he was appointed the first coroner of Cook County. He held this post until August 1832.

He died in Deerfield on September 19, 1865, and was buried at Deerfield Cemetery.

== Legacy ==
Prairie Wolf Slough, a forest preserve in Deerfield, just north of Deerfield High School is named for Clark using his Native American name.

According to New York Times science writer William K. Stevens, Clark was the first owner of a part of Somme Woods in Northbrook. He sold that property to John Frederick Werhane in 1853. The site was farmed by the Werhane family until it was acquired as a forest preserve in the 1930s. It is currently known for its prairie, savanna, and woodland restoration, as featured in Stevens' book.
