= William Wagner (physician) =

German-American physician & revolutionary

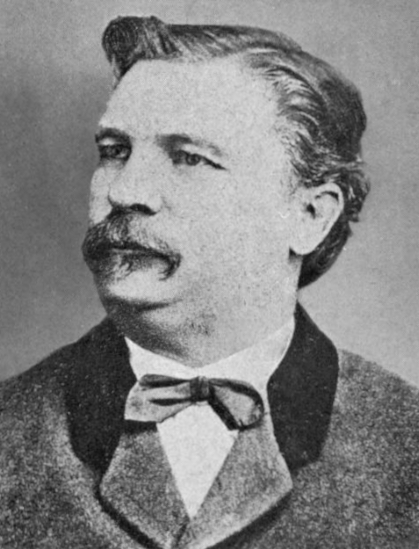

Coroner of Cook County
- In office 1864–1869
- Preceded by: Orsemus Morrison
- Succeeded by: Benjamin L. Cleaves

Personal details
- Born: February 10, 1825 Mingolsheim, Grand Duchy of Baden, German Confederation
- Died: July 5, 1872 (aged 47) Chicago, Illinois, United States
- Resting place: Graceland Cemetery
- Party: Republican
- Spouse: Matilda Brentano
- Children: 4
- Education: University of Würzburg

Military service
- Allegiance: United States of America; Union
- Branch/service: United States Army; Union Army
- Years of service: 1861–1863
- Rank: Major
- Unit: 24th Illinois Infantry Regiment
- Battles/wars: American Civil War

William Wagner (1825–1872) was a German American physician and revolutionary who was active in 19th century Chicago politics.

== Biography ==
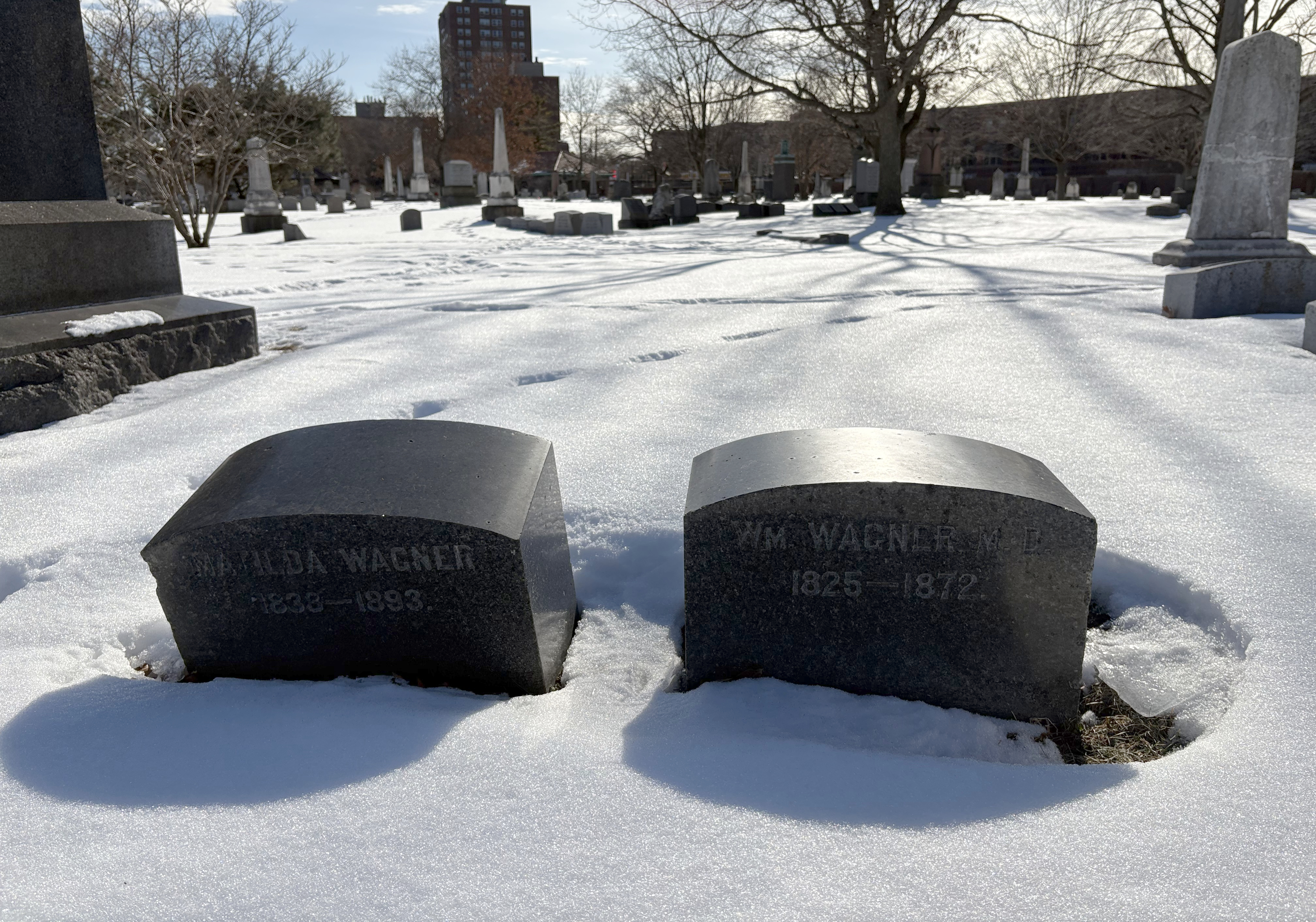
Wagner's grave at Graceland Cemetery

Wagner was born on Kislau Castle in Mingolsheim, where his father was Quartermaster for the Baden Corps of Invalids stationed there. He later grew up in Karlsruhe, with his father being a Registrator, and was educated at the University of Heidelberg before participating in the 1848 Revolution in Baden alongside compatriots Carl Schurz and Franz Sigel. He finished his studies at the University of Würzburg in the Kingdom of Bavaria and emigrated to the United States. Wagner settled in Chicago in 1849, where he established a medical practice. He was appointed City Doctor by Mayor John Charles Haines in 1859 and served as a Major and surgeon in the 24th Illinois Infantry Regiment from 1861 to 1863. In 1864 he was elected Coroner of Cook County on the Republican ticket and reelected in 1865. He was one of the organizers of the Cook County Hospital in 1866 and was appointed a member of the Board of Health in 1867. He married Matilda Brentano, adopted stepdaughter of Illinois Congressman and fellow Forty-Eighter Lorenz Brentano.

He died in Chicago on July 5, 1872, and was buried at Graceland Cemetery.
