= John Hoffman (Illinois politician) =

American politician

Sheriff of Cook County
- In office 1878–1880
- Preceded by: Charles Kern
- Succeeded by: Orrin L. Mann

Personal details
- Born: February 19, 1835 Grand Duchy of Hesse and by Rhine
- Died: December 18, 1893 (aged 58) Chicago, Illinois
- Party: Republican

Military service
- Allegiance: United States of America; Union
- Branch/service: United States Army; Union Army
- Years of service: 1861–1865
- Rank: Major
- Battles/wars: American Civil War

John Hoffman (February 19, 1835 – December 18, 1893) was a German American politician in Chicago who served as the Republican Sheriff of Cook County from 1878 to 1880. An immigrant from Hesse Darmstadt and a veteran of the American Civil War, Hoffman returned to Chicago following his military service and engaged in business, including the ownership of a livery stable in the city. He was a member of the Chicago Board of Trade and active in Republican political circles. Hoffman was elected Sheriff by a margin of 4,000 votes and served a single term before Republicans lost the 1879 elections.
