= Charles Kern =

American politician

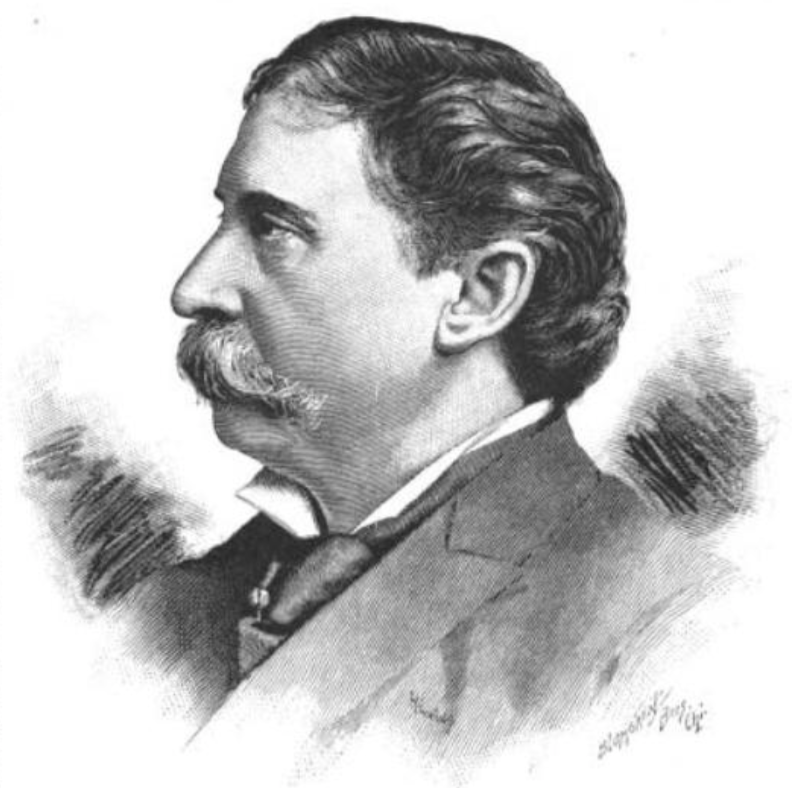

Sheriff of Cook County
- In office 1872–1878
- Preceded by: Timothy Bradley
- Succeeded by: John Hoffman

Personal details
- Born: March 18, 1831 Otterbach, Kingdom of Bavaria
- Died: January 25, 1896 (aged 64)
- Party: Democratic
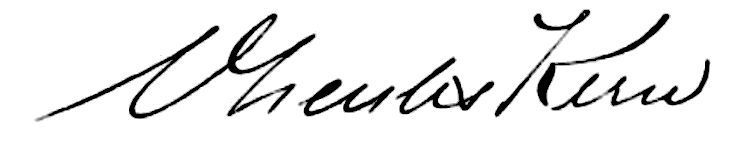
- Signature

Charles Kern (April 18, 1831 – January 25, 1896) was a Democratic politician in Chicago who served as the Sheriff of Cook County from 1872 to 1878.

== Biography ==
Born in Rhenish Bavaria, Kern immigrated to the United States and worked in the hotel industry. He was unexpectedly elected Sheriff of the heavily Republican Vigo County, Indiana in 1862 on the Democratic ticket, and held office until 1864. He then briefly relocated to Cincinnati, where he managed the Galt House Hotel until he moved to Chicago in 1865 to open a restaurant. Active in Chicago politics, he was the unanimously chosen Democratic nominee for Cook County Sheriff in 1868, 1870, 1872, and 1876 elections, the last two of which he won. He served two terms as Sheriff before losing in the 1878 election. He served as President of the Cook County Democratic Club, the Illinois State Sportsmen's Association, the Prairie Shooting Club, and the Audubon Club. Kern's tenure as Cook County Sheriff was marked by allegations of corruption, and he was said to have arranged to cut the per diem cost of food per prisoner by ten cents and pocketed the difference. Kern was never indicted for corruption, however.
