= John P. Hoffmann =

American sociologist

John P. Hoffmann (born May 2, 1962) is a professor of Sociology and Associate Dean in the College of Family, Home, and Social Sciences at Brigham Young University, where he joined the faculty in 1999.

== Education and research ==
He completed his undergraduate studies at James Madison University in his native Virginia, where he majored in Political Science. He went on to receive an MPH from the Rollins School of Public Health at Emory University and a PhD in Criminal Justice from University at Albany, SUNY. According to his faculty biography at Brigham Young, his research focuses on "the etiology and consequences of drug use, theories of delinquency, mental health problems, and the influence of religious affiliation and practices on behaviors and attitudes."

== Books ==
- Japanese Saints: Mormons in the Land of the Rising Sun. Lexington Books (2007)
- Revisiting Thomas F. O’Dea’s The Mormons: Contemporary Perspectives. University of Utah Press (2008)
- Delinquency Theories: Appraisals and Applications. Routledge (2011)
- Linear Regression Models: Applications in R. Chapman & Hall (2022)
