= Cook County Medical Examiner =

Position of county coroner for Cook County, Illinois

The Cook County Medical Examiner is the coroner of Cook County, Illinois. Occupants are credential medical examiners, appointed by president of the Cook County Board of Commissioners, subject to confirmation by the Cook County Board of Commissioners. The office was created in 1976, replacing the previous office of Cook County Coroner.

The office of Cook County Coroner existed from 1831 to 1976, and from 1836 was an elected position. County voters, in 1972, elected to replace the office of coroner with the current office of medical examiner.

== Former position of Cook County Coroner ==
Cook County Coroner
- Inaugural holder: John Kinzie Clark
- Formation: April 1831
- Final holder: Andrew J. Toman
- Abolished: December 6, 1976

The Cook County Coroner was the coroner of Cook County, Illinois until the position was abolished in 1976. The office of existed as an elected position from the early history of Cook County's government until its abolition in 1976.

The first Coroner of Cook County was John Kinzie Clark, who was appointed in April 1831. The first elected coroner, Orsemus Morrison, assumed office in 1836.

From the inception, the coroner's office was a department riddled with patronage and corruption. Ernst Schmidt, elected in 1862, resigned due to protest of interference with his job in January 1864. In its later years, occupants of the office and their inquest jurors often acted a rubber-stamp to the findings of the police and prosecutors.

In 1972, Cook County voters strongly voted by referendum in favor of eliminating the elected position of county coroner, replacing it with an appointed medical examiner. Several notable incidents which took place in the 1960s spurred this This was the last time that voters in Cook County would vote on whether to eliminate an office until 2016, when they voted to eliminate the office of Cook County Recorder of Deeds and merge its duties into the Cook County Clerk's office. The office was eliminated on December 6, 1976. It was replaced by the appointed position of Cook County Medical Examiner.

=== List of Cook County Coroners ===
Clerk	Term in office	Party	Notes	Cite
John Kinzie Clark	1831–1832			
Elijah Wentworth	1832–1834			
Ashbel Steele	1836–1838			
Orsemus Morrison	1836–1838	Democratic	First elected Coroner	
John K. Boyer	1838–1840			
Edward Murphy	1840–1844		Elected in 1840 and 1842	
Orson Smith	1844–1846			
Patrick Kelley	1846–1848			
Nicholas Burdell	1848–1852		Elected in 1848 and 1850	
Austin Hines	1852–1854			
James S. Beach	1854–1856		Simultaneously ex officio Sheriff of Cook County, April 1855 – November 1856	
George P. Hansen	1856–1858			
William James	1858–1862		Elected in 1858 and 1860	
Ernst Schmidt	1862–1864		Resigned in January 1864	
William Wagner	1864–1869	Republican	Elected in 1864 and 1865	
Benjamin L. Cleaves	1869–1870		Simultaneously ex officio Sheriff of Cook County, April 1870 – November 1870	
John Stephens	1870–1874	Republican	Elected in 1870 and 1872	
Emil Dietzsch	1874–1878	Republican	Elected in 1874 and 1876	
Orrin L. Mann	1878–1880	Republican	Elected in 1878	
Canute R. Matson	1880–1882	Republican	Elected in 1880	
N.B. Boyden	1882–1885	Democratic		
Henry L. Hertz	1885–1892	Republican	Elected in 1884, 1886, 1888, 1890	
James McHale	1892−1896	Democratic (switched to People's Party while in office)	Elected in 1892; defeated for reelection in 1896	
George Berz	1896–1900	Republican	Elected in 1896; defeated for reelection in 1900	
John E. Traeger	1900–1904	Democratic	Elected in 1904; defeated for reelection in 1904	
Peter M. Hoffman	1904–1922	Republican	Elected in 1904, 1908, 1912, 1916, and 1920; resigned to assume office as Cook County sheriff	
Oscar Wolff	December 4, 1922–December 1928	Republican	Appointed by Cook County Board of Commissioners on December 4, 1922; elected in 1923 and 1924	
Herman Bundesen	December 1928–November 18, 1931	Democratic	Elected in 1928; resigned to become Chicago City Health Commissioner	
Frank J. Walsh	November 18, 1931 – February 12, 1940	Democratic	Appointed by Cook County Board of Commissioners on November 18, 1931; elected in 1932 and 1938; died in office	
A. L. Brodie	February 14, 1940–December 1952	Democratic	Appointed by Cook County Board of Commissioners on February 14, 1940; elected in 1940, 1944, and 1948	
Walter McCarron	December 1952–December 1960	Republican	Elected in 1952 and 1958; defeated for reelection in 1960	
Andrew J. Toman	December 1960–December 1, 1976	Democratic		

== Cook County Medical Examiner (since 1976) ==
The medical examiner and medical examiner's office took over the duties of the coroner and coroner's duty in 1976. The occupant of the office is a credentialed medical examiner. The office is appointed, rather than elected, with the president of the Cook County Board of Commissioners nominating appointees, and the Cook County Board of Commissioners confirming them.

By the turn of the 21st century, the medical examiner's office was tasked with investigating roughly 5,000 deaths annually.

The medical examiner's office is located on the West Side of Chicago.

=== List of Cook County Medical Examiners ===
Medical Examiner	Term in office	Appointed by	Cite
Robert J. Stein	1976–1993	George Dunne	
Edmund Donoghue	1993–2006	Richard Phelan	
Nancy Jones	2007–2012	Todd Stroger	
Stephen Cina	2012–2016	Toni Preckwinkle	
Ponni Arunkumar	2016–	Toni Preckwinkle	
