= Robert Jessup =

American painter (born 1952)

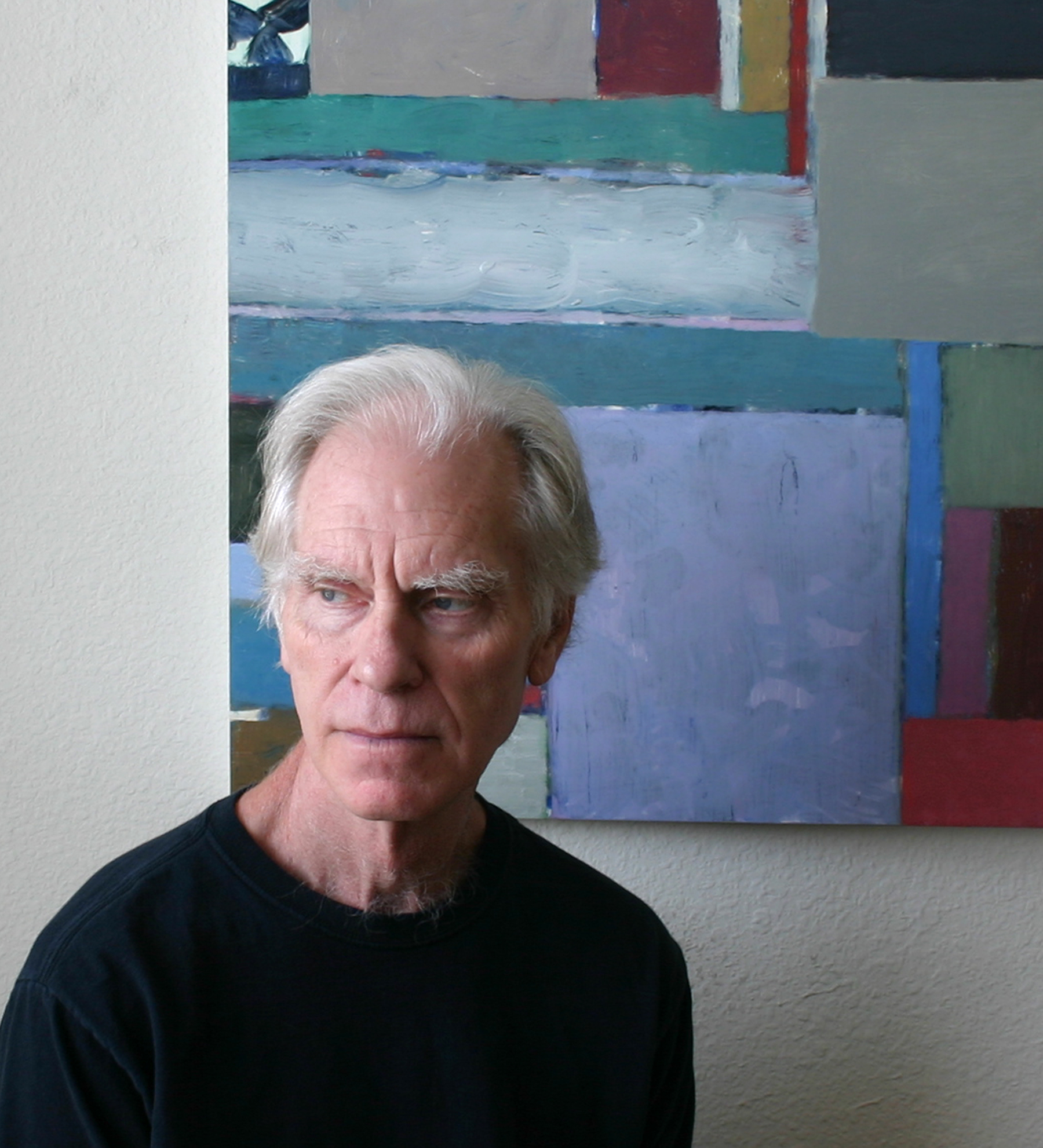
- Born: July 18, 1952 (age 74); Moscow, Idaho, U.S.
- Known for: Painting, drawing
- Children: Christopher Jessup (musician)

Robert Jessup (born July 18, 1952) is an American painter. Creating abstract works since 2011, he painted figuratively for most of his career, particularly large triptychs.

== Biography ==
Jessup was born on July 18, 1952, in Moscow, Idaho, to Clifford and Alvina Jessup and was raised in Seattle, Washington. He received his BFA in painting from the University of Washington in 1975 and his MFA in painting from the University of Iowa in 1979. He has had professorships at Ohio State University, Georgia State University, Cornell University, the Hartford Art School and the University of North Texas.

== Works ==
=== Figurative (1971–2004) ===
Although Jessup occasionally created in other styles this period is predominantly stylized and representational. The paintings tended to be large triptychs roughly 15 feet wide by 6 feet tall. The entire surface of each painting tended to be heavily textured like a choppy sea when viewed up close.

=== Transitional (2005–2010) ===
Already an established artist, Jessup, then in his mid-fifties, and his wife Faith travelled to Europe for a month in 2008. They travelled to Madrid, Brussels and Florence. Jessup said baroque paintings he saw in the Prado in Spain influenced him the most. He returned “with a desire to be more aggressive, more ambitious, more visionary, and take more chances.” Paintings during this time were described as strange and sometimes unsettling.

=== Abstract (2011–present) ===
Jessup “exchanged ferocious depiction for ferocious plasticity” and started painting completely in the abstract style. He started working “with a 10-inch palette knife, making huge sweeping gestures, pushing the paint this way and that, scraping it off and hurling it back on.”

== Selected exhibitions ==
- The Amarillo Museum of Art, Amarillo, Texas
- Besharat Gallery, Atlanta, Georgia
- Conduit Gallery, Dallas, Texas
- Fay Gold Gallery, Atlanta, Georgia
- Schomburg Gallery, Santa Monica, California
- Virginia Museum of Fine Arts, Richmond, Virginia

== Personal life ==
Jessup is married to the painter Faith Scott Jessup, whom he met while both were at Cornell. They raised two children, Molly and Christopher. He has one sibling, an older brother, Richard Jessup, a retired lawyer.

== Collections ==
His drawings and paintings are in the collections of the Metropolitan Museum of Art (New York), the Brooklyn Museum of Art, the High Museum of Art, and the Dallas Museum of Art.
