= Cook County Sheriff =

Sheriff of Cook County, Illinois

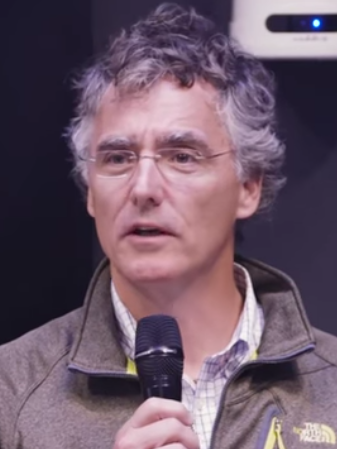
- Incumbent; Tom Dart since December 2006
- Term length: 4 years
- Inaugural holder: John H. Kinzie
- Formation: 1831

The Cook County Sheriff is the sheriff of Cook County, Illinois, heading the Cook County Sheriff's Office.

== Office description ==
Terms are currently four-years in length.

== Officeholders ==
Sherriff	Term in office	Party	Notes	Cite
John H. Kinzie	1831–1832		Appointed by governor John Reynolds	
Stephen R. Forbes	1832–1834		Cook County's first elected sheriff	
Silas W. Sherman	1834–1838	Democratic		
Isaac R. Gavin	1838–1840	Independent Democrat		
Ashbel Steele	1840–1842			
Samuel J. Lowe	1842–1846			
Isaac Cook	1846–1850			
William L. Church	1850–1852			
Cyrus Bradley	1852–1854			
James Andrew	1854–1855			
James Beach	1855–1856 (acting)			
John L. Wilson	1856–1858			
John Gray	1859–1860			
Anton C. Hesing	1860–1862	Republican		
David Hammond	1862–1864			
John A. Nelson	1864–1866			
John Lourie Beveridge	1866–1868	Republican		
Gustav Fischer	1868–1870		Absconded in 1869	
Benjamin L. Cleaves	1870		Simultaneously ex officio Cook County Coroner	
Timothy Bradley	1870–1872			
Charles Kern	1872–1878	Democratic		
John Hoffman	1878–1880	Republican		
Orrin L. Mann	1880–1882	Republican	Elected in 1880	
Seth Hanchett	1882–1886	Republican		
Canute R. Matson	1886–1890	Republican		
James H. Gilbert	1890–1894			
James Pease	1894–1898	Republican		
Ernest Magerstadt	1899–1902	Republican		
Thomas E. Barrett	1902–1906	Democratic		
Christopher Strassheim	1906–1910	Republican		
Michael Zimmer	1910–1914	Democratic		
John E. Traeger	1914–1918	Democratic		
Charles W. Peters	1918–1922	Republican		
Peter M. Hoffman	December 1922–December 26, 1926	Republican		
Charles E. Graydon	December 29, 1926–December 1928			
John E. Traeger	December 3, 1928–December 1930	Democratic	Had previously served as sheriff	
William D. Meyering	1930–1934	Democratic		
John Toman	1934–1938			
Thomas J. O'Brien	1938–1942	Democratic		
A. L. Brodie	1942–1943			
Michael F. Mulcahy				
Elmer Michael Walsh	1946-1950	Republican	Elected in 1946	
John E. Babb	1950–1954	Republican		
Joseph D. Lohman	1954–1958	Democrat		
Frank G. Sain	1958-1962	Democrat		
Richard B. Ogilvie	1962–1966	Republican		
Joseph I. Woods	1966–1970	Republican		
Richard Elrod	1970–1986	Democratic		
James E. O'Grady	1986–1990	Republican	Elected in 1986; lost reelection in 1990	
Michael F. Sheahan	1990–2006	Democratic	Elected in 1990, 1994, 1998, 2002	
Tom Dart	2006–present	Democratic	Elected in 2006, 2010, 2014, 2018, 2022	

== Election results ==
Cook County Sheriff general elections
Year	Winning candidate	Party	Vote (pct)	Opponent	Party	Vote (pct)	Opponent	Party	Vote (pct)	Opponent	Party	Vote (pct)	Opponent	Party	Vote (pct)	Opponent	Party	Vote (pct)
1832... 1898	[data missing]																	
1902	Thomas E. Barrett	Democratic	141,822 ( %)	Daniel D. Healy	Republican	135,036 ( %)	James P. Larsen	Social Democratic	13,134 ( %)	Henry Sale	Socialist Labor	5,973 ( %)	Joseph P. Tracy	Prohibition	4,480 (1.32%)	Thomas Donegan	Single Tax	908 ( %)
1906	Christopher Strassheim	Republican	131,608 ( %)	Harry J. Gibbons	Democratic	93,836 ( %)	James J. Gray	Independent League	49,296 ( %)	26,055	Socialist	26,055 ( %)	S. A. Wilson	Prohibition	3,735 (%)	John Fitzpatrick	Progressive Alliance	1,400 ( %)
1910	Michael Zimmer	Democratic	165,445 ( %)	Frank A. Volger	Republican	145,598	William Van Bodegraven	Socialist	27,588 ( %)	O. F. Sarber	Prohibition	5,038 (%)						
1914	John E. Traeger	Democratic	166,335 ( %)	George K. Schmidt	Republican	112,502	Frederick S. Oliver	Progressive	50,117 ( %)	Bernard McMahon	Socialist	23,319 ( %)	George W. Hoover	Prohibition	1,229 (%)			
1918	Charles W. Peters	Republican	177,912 ( %)	Anton Cermak	Democratic	174,829 (%)	Adolf Dreifuss	Socialist	19,572 ( %)									
1922... 1982	[data missing]																	
1986	James E. O'Grady	Democratic	706,659 (51.12%)	Richard J. Elrod	Democratic	673,233 (48.79%)												
1990	Michael F. Sheahan	Democratic	719,489 (55.41%)	James E. O'Grady	Republican	369,631 (28.47%)	Tommy Brewer	Harold Washington Party	191,101 (14.72%)	William M. Piechuch, Sr.	Illinois Solidarity	18,318 (1.41%)						
1994	Michael F. Sheahan	Democratic		John D. Tourtelot	Republican		William A. Brown	Harold Washington Party		William J. Benson	Populist							
1998	Michael F. Sheahan	Democratic	903,053 (71.11%)	LeRoy Martin	Republican	366,867 (28.89%)												
2002	Michael F. Sheahan	Democratic	984,348 (76.88%)	Ronald Swick	Republican	296,062 (23.12%)												
2006	Tom Dart	Democratic	942,113 (74.70%)	Peter Garza	Republican	319,011 (25.30%)												
2010	Tom Dart	Democratic	1,041,696 (77.26%)	Frederick Collins	Republican	257,682 (19.11%)	Marshall P. Lewis	Green	48,930 (3.63%)									
2014	Tom Dart	Democratic	1,055,783 (100%)															
2018	Tom Dart	Democratic	1,455,825 (100%)															
2022	Tom Dart	Democratic	1,041,525 (74.21%)	Lupe Aguirre	Republican	321,252 (22.89%)	Brad Sandefur	Libertarian	40,752 (2.90%)									
