= Tony Maws =

American chef and restaurateur (born 1970)

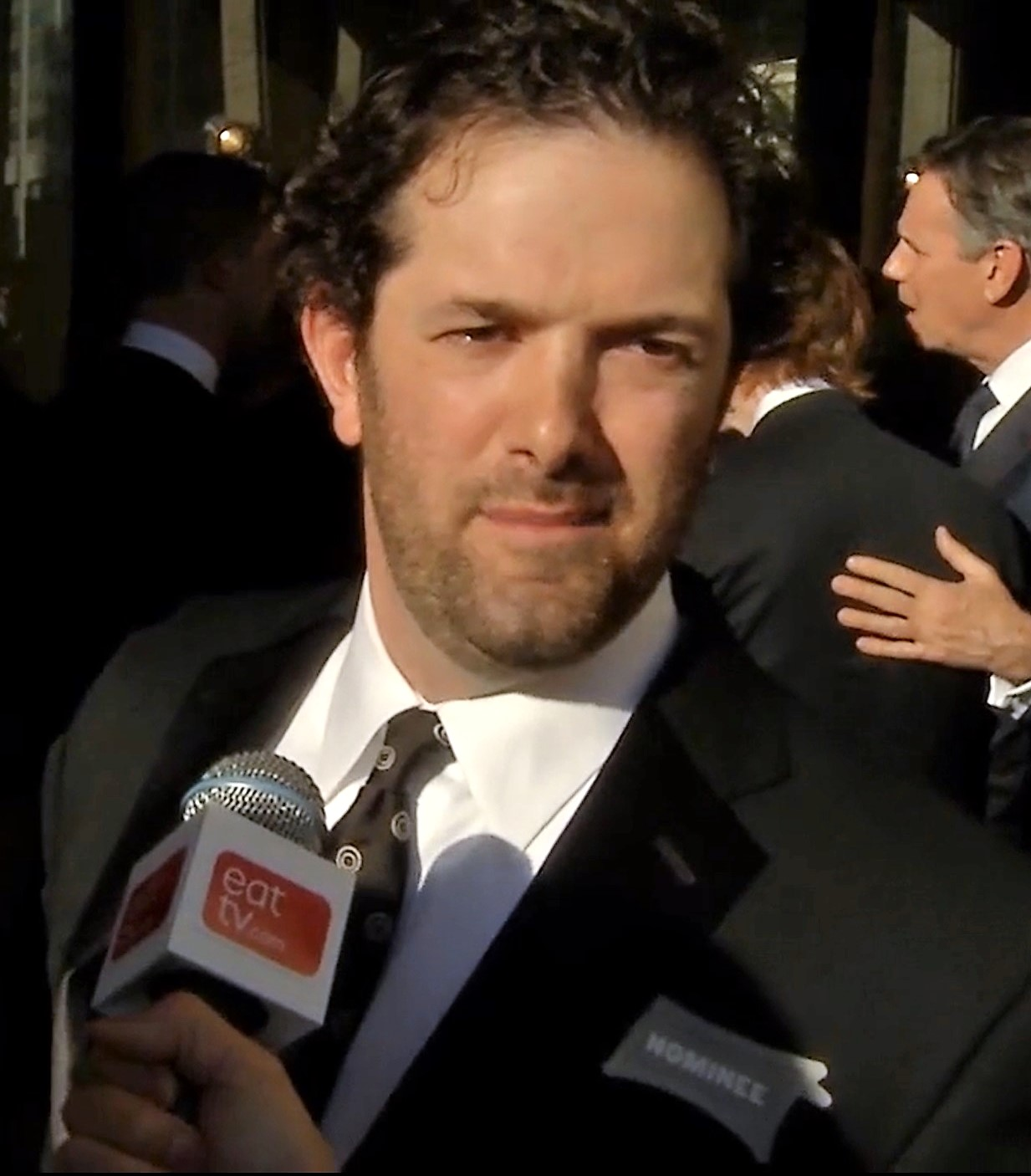
Maws at the James Beard Foundation Awards 2011

Tony Maws (born 1970) is an American chef and restaurateur. Maws was the chef/owner of the former Craigie on Main (once called Craigie Street Bistrot) in Cambridge, Massachusetts.

== Early years ==
Raised in Newton, Massachusetts, Tony Maws attended the Belmont Hill School, graduating in 1988. After graduating from the University of Michigan with a BA in Psychology and uncertain what he wanted to do, Maws traveled to Europe for a year and upon returning to New England quickly got a job as a waiter in Martha's Vineyard. While working as a waiter Maws wrote to chefs around the U.S. and was hired by Chris Schlesinger to work at the original East Coast Grill.

== Craigie on Main ==
In 2003, Maws opened Craigie Street Bistrot in Cambridge, Massachusetts, winning several awards and recognitions. In late 2008 Maws moved Craigie Street Bistrot to a larger venue on Main Street in Cambridge, adding a bar and an open kitchen. He also renamed it Craigie on Main. Craigie on Main closed in the fall of 2021.

=== Awards ===
James Beard Foundation Award - Best Chef Northeast, May, 2011

James Beard Award Finalist - Best Chef Northeast, March, 2010

James Beard Award Finalist - Best Chef Northeast, March, 2009

"Best Chef," Boston Magazine (Best of Boston), 2008

"Best New Chefs Hall of Fame," Food & Wine Magazine, 2008

"Best Chef," "Best French Restaurant" and "Best Pasta Dream Meal" (Gnocchi Parisienne), Boston Magazine (Best of Boston), 2006

"One of America’s 10 Best New Chefs" (Tony Maws), Food & Wine, 2005

Boston’s "top rising chef" (Tony Maws), Stuff@Night, 2004

"Best up-and-coming chef," Boston Magazine (Best of Boston), 2003
