= East Coast Grill =

Defunct restaurant in Cambridge, Massachusetts

- Interactive map of East Coast Grill

Restaurant information
- Established: 1985
- Closed: 2017
- Previous owner: Chris Schlesinger
- Location: 1271 Cambridge Street, Cambridge, Middlesex, Massachusetts, 02139, United States
- Coordinates: 42°22′26.71″N 71°5′47.67″W

East Coast Grill & Raw Bar, commonly known as East Coast Grill, was a seafood and barbecue restaurant in the Inman Square neighborhood of Cambridge, Massachusetts. It was opened by Chris Schlesinger in 1985. The restaurant was famous for their annual Hell Night which focused on super-spicy foods.

The restaurant was sold in 2012 to James Lozano, executive chef Jason Herd, and general manager Robin Greenspan. It closed permanently in 2017. The staff at the restaurant included Andy Husbands and Tony Maws

== Legacy ==
The restaurant was important for Boston's dining scene, according to one review, the dining scene in the city was “fancy, pricey and …a tad stodgy … (but East Coast Grill) managed to change the course of Boston’s dining future.”

== Television ==
The restaurant was featured on Season 1, episode 8 of Man v. Food. It was also featured in his show Amazing Eats and on season 12 of Food Paradise.

== Hell Night ==
Schlesinger called Hell Night a “Boston institution.”. In 2011, an ambulance had to be called for a diner who passed out from the food. People who participated had to sign a Liability waiver.

== See also ==
- List of defunct restaurants of the United States
- List of seafood restaurants
