= Food Paradise season 12 =

Food Paradise
- Season 12
- No. of episodes: 13

Release
- Original network: Travel Channel
- Original release: August 27 – November 12, 2017

Season chronology
- ← Previous; Season 11 Next → Season 13

The twelfth season of Food Paradise, an American food reality television series narrated by Jess Blaze Snider on the Travel Channel, premiered on August 27, 2017. First-run episodes of the series aired in the United States on the Travel Channel on Mondays at 10:00 p.m. EDT. The season contained 13 episodes and concluded airing on November 12, 2017.

Food Paradise features the best places to find various cuisines at food locations across America. Each episode focuses on a certain type of restaurant, such as "Diners", "Bars", "Drive-Thrus" or "Breakfast" places that people go to find a certain food specialty.

== Episodes ==
- Note: These episodes aired from August 27, 2017 November 12, 2017.

=== Big Easy Eats ===
Restaurant	Location	Specialty(s)
Galliano Southern Casual Dining	Warehouse District, New Orleans, Louisiana	"LaPlace" – thick-cut pork chop stuffed with andouille sausage (brined in saltwater, dark beer, brown sugar, cane syrup, bay leaves, and creole mustard), seasoned with olive oil and creole seasoning, seared on a char-grill, bone crowned with onion rings and served on top of creole 'dressing' (cornbread stuffing made with celerly, onion, bell peppers, garlic, creole seasoning, chicken stock, ham-hock stock and a whole ham hock) and a side of red beans, drizzled with 'tiger sauce' (a sweet and sour sauce). "Crawfish Pasta Monica" – fresh fettuccine tossed in a cream sauce (made with local crawfish tails, sautéed onions, garlic, white wine and heavy cream, and braised trinity of onions, celery, and green peppers), creole seasoning, parsley, and grated Parmesan cheese, served with mozzarella cheese-topped toasted garlic butter French bread.
Maison	Frenchmen Street, New Orleans	"Cochon de Lait Po'boy" – pork butt (seasoned with creole spices, carrots, onions, celery, and ginger beer), baked in oven, pulled, and tossed in homemade barbecue sauce (made with ketchup, creole mustard, brown sugar, apple cider vinegar, liquid smoke, and honey), topped with jalapeño coleslaw, served on toasted French bread with sweet potato fries.
Elizabeth's Restaurant	Bywater, New Orleans	'Real Food Done Real Good': "Sweet Potato and Duck Hash on a Cornbread Waffle" – hash (made with sweet potato chunks, confit duck leg meat, scallions, creole seasoning, and diced red, yellow and green bell peppers) a top a cornbread waffle (made with white flour, cornmeal, corn flour, baking powder, and sugar), topped with pepper jelly (made from habaneros, jalapenos, sugar, and liquid pectin). "Brandy Milk Punch" – brandy and milk shaken and served in a short glass with a sprinkle of cinnamon. "Bananas Foster stuffed French Toast" – French toast (la pain perdu or 'lost bread'—day-old French rolls dipped in eggs and milk) stuffed with bananas foster and cream cheese filling (banana slices sautéed in butter, brown sugar, rum and Grand Marnier), garnished with sliced bananas and powdered sugar.
Neyow's Creole Café	Mid-City, New Orleans	"Fried Chicken & Red Beans" – chicken pieces (rubbed with salt and pepper, dipped in egg-wash of egg, water and ice, dredged in flour), deep-fried in grease, served with a side of red beans (made with red beans, ham hocks, smoked sausage, butter, onions, celery and green bell peppers), topped with raw white onions. "Neyow’s Gumbo" – fresh shrimp stewed in a seafood stock (made with seasoned ham, smoked sausage, bay leaves, roux, browning sauce, and filé—sassafras seasoning), topped with white rice.
Hansen's Sno-Bliz	Tchoupitoulas Street, Uptown, New Orleans	Making Sno-balls since 1939 (created sno-bliz custom shaved ice machine): "Senior Atomic Sno-Ball" – fine shaved ice powder topped with cream of nectar (made with simple syrup, cream and secret nectar), crushed pineapple, marshmallow fluff, vanilla ice cream and a cherry on top, garnished with a cocktail umbrella.
Middendorf's Seafood Restaurant	Manchac, Louisiana	'Home of the original world-famous thin fried catfish': "Thin Fried Catfish" – local lake-fresh catfish (sliced thin, marinated in salt brine, battered in cornmeal, corn flour, salt and water), deep-fried and served with classic hush puppies (made with flour, baking powder, cornmeal, salt and cayenne pepper, diced onion and green onions), scooped into small balls and deep-fried; fish drizzled with hot sauce. "Barbecued Oysters" – fresh-caught oysters on the half-shell, broiled and topped with homemade secret barbecue sauce.
Beachbum Berry's Latitude 29	French Quarter, New Orleans	Tiki Bar serving 1960s-style tiki cocktails: "Snake Versus Mongoose" – two drinks in one (the snake is Latitude 29’s “King Cobra”—gin, cherry brandy, pomegranate syrup, allspice liqueur, served inside a cocktail glass encased in shaved ice; the mongoose is made with rum, bourbon, bitters and fruit juices), served inside a tiki bowl. "Sambal and grits" – local shrimp marinated in Indonesian sambal chili sauce, and grilled, served atop grits and gravy (made with Portuguese ground sausage, flour, heavy cream, and miso), garnished with homemade bacon marmalade and fresh basil.
Café Giovanni Creole Italian	French Quarter, New Orleans	"Pasta Jambalaya" – penne pasta tossed in a sauce (made from trinity of onion, celery and green peppers, diced tasso and andouille sausages, chicken thigh meat, local shrimp, vermouth, marinara sauce, brown sauce, fresh rosemary, Cajun blackening spices, Worcestershire sauce and lots of butter).

=== Route 66 ===
Restaurant	Location	Specialty(s)
The Berghoff Restaurant	Chicago, Illinois	Established in 1898, one of the oldest restaurants in the city: "Classic Reuben Sandwich" – five-ounces of sliced-thin corned beef topped with Swiss cheese, sauerkraut (made with sautéed chunks of Applewood-smoked bacon and caraway seeds, de-glaze with house lager), and homemade Thousand Island dressing in between freshly baked and panini-pressed caraway seed rye bread, served with potato chips and a dill pickle.
Missouri Hick Bar-B-Q	Cuba, Missouri	"St. Louis Style Pork Ribs" – a whole 2 1/2 pound rack of spare ribs (rubbed with cumin, paprika, sugar, chili powder, black pepper and salt), slow-smoked with cherrywood for 4 hours, sliced and slathered with original barbecue sauce 'sweet n' smoky' (made with ketchup, molasses, brown sugar, onion, garlic powder, cayenne pepper and their signature smoked IPA beer). "Ory's Spud" – a 1 1/4 pound baked potato topped with smoky beer baked beans, pulled pork, two kinds of shredded cheese, bacon bits, chives, special seasoning and a cherry pepper.
Woody's Wood-Fire Pizza Bar & Oven	Joplin, Missouri	"The Mutha’" – par-baked crust topped with tomato sauce, shredded mozzarella cheese, Canadian bacon, Italian & American style ground sausage, beef meatballs, mushrooms, onions, olives, roasted garlic, red & bell green peppers, pepperoni, and four cheeses: mozzarella, provolone, Asiago and parmesan, cooked in a custom built wood fire brick oven with red and white oak. "Greek Chicken Pizza" – topped with Alfredo sauce, fresh spinach, garlic, grilled chicken and artichoke hearts, gorgonzola, feta and quad blend of cheese.
Tucker's Onion Burgers	Oklahoma City, Oklahoma	"Mother Tucker Burger" – triple-decker onion burger made with locally sourced beef patties, seasoned with kosher salt and black pepper, grilled on the flattop, fresh thinly sliced grilled Spanish yellow onions smashed into the patties, and topped with six slices of American cheese, grilled jalapeños, shredded lettuce, tomatoes, ketchup and yellow mustard on a toasted bun, served with fries. "The Cobb Burger" – onion-smashed beef patty topped with a special sauce (made with blue cheese, bacon, mayonnaise, lemon juice, black pepper and green onions), two slices of fried green tomatoes, avocado, and cheddar cheese on a toasted bun.
Yellow City Street Food	Amarillo, Texas	"French Chick" – fried chicken breast (dipped in buttermilk, eggs, and sriracha, dry-dredged in panko crumbs, Cajun spice and ancho chili)), topped with melted white cheddar and drizzled with a honey-sriracha glaze, served between two slices of French toast (thin-sliced brioche bread in a batter of eggs, cinnamon, sugar, salt and mocha-almond infused balsamic vinaigrette, garnished with powdered sugar. "Animal Fries" – thick-cut fries topped with house-made remoulade sauce (made with mayo, sriracha, garlic and special blend of spring onions, pickles and soy sauce), and bacon-caramelized red onion marmalade.
Sazon New World Cuisine	Santa Fe, New Mexico	"New Mexican Lamb Molé" – bone-in lamb chops sautéed with oil, salt and pepper, finished in oven and topped with a molé (made from roasted pecans and pinon nuts, apricots, dried chili peppers, chicken consommé, sautéed in butter in a cazuela (Mexican clay pot), served with mashed butternut squash and microgreens. "Shrimp Enchilada" – shrimp tossed in a sauce (made with sautéed onions, poblano peppers, zucchini blossoms, and cream), blended and layered between two flour tortillas.
66 Diner	Sycamore, Albuquerque, New Mexico	"The Pile Up" – deep-fried potato chunks, topped with bacon, shredded cheddar cheese, jalapeños, two over-easy eggs, green chili sauce (made with chopped roasted green chili, onions, tomatoes, seasoned salt, granulated garlic, sage, cumin, thyme, black pepper, and roux), and drizzled with red chili sauce. "Pink Cadillac Milkshake" – locally made strawberry ice cream, crushed chocolate & cream cookies, and milk, blended and topped with whipped cream and a cherry.
The Albright	Santa Monica Pier, Santa Monica, California	"Spicy Seafood Soup" – clams, mussels, calamari, shrimp, langoustine, and cod fish sautéed with zucchini, yellow squash, and tomatoes in a seafood broth (made with onions, tomatoes, carrots, celery, jalapeños, bird's eye chili, lobster shells, guajillo chili paste), finished off with cilantro and jalapeños. "Fish and Chips" – three pieces of local cod fish (dipped in flour and beer batter from local ale), deep-fried and served with homemade coleslaw and fries sprinkled with Old Bay seasoning.

=== BBQ Bragging Rights ===
Restaurant	Location	Specialty(s)
Pinkerton's Barbecue	Houston, Texas	"Prime Brisket" – prime beef brisket (rubbed with black pepper and salt), smoked low and slow for 18 hours, wrapped in butcher paper after 12 hours, and smoked for 6 more hours with post oak wood, sliced and served with white bread, mashed potatoes and coleslaw. "Beef Ribs" – 2 pounds of beef ribs (rubbed with salt, pepper and secret spices), smoked for 12 hours, sliced and served with dirty rice and pickles.
Slab Real Dope BBQ & Beer	Austin, Texas	“SLAB (Slow, Low and Banging)”: "El Jeffe" – beef brisket (rubbed with salt and pepper), smoked low and slow for 14 hours over pecan and oak wood, chopped and topped with ‘liquid gold’ queso (American white cheese, green chilies and whole milk), and ‘backyard barbecue’ red sauce (made with ketchup, vinegar, Worcestershire sauce, yellow mustard and secret spices), corn chips and jalapenos, served on a toasted jalapeno-cheddar bun. "The Donk" – (named after an old car called a 'donk', riding high on 24's): slow-smoked pulled pork with red sauce, mustard slaw, chopped brisket, pickled, onions, jalapenos, rib meat in a vinegar-based Carolina sauce, and smoked chicken with Alabama white sauce and a hot link, queso and corn chips, on a toasted jalapeno bun.
Rodney Scott's Whole Hog BBQ	Charleston, South Carolina	"Whole Hog Barbecue Plate" – whole pig roasted on an open-fire pit low and slow smoked for 12 hours with oak and hickory wood, seasoned with salt, red pepper flakes and secret spices, slathered with special vinegar-based sauce, pulled and served with a side of collard green with pork, crispy pork skins, a side of vinegar sauce, and white bread. "Whole Hog Sandwich" – large scoop of pulled pork with vinegar sauce on a tasted bun.
Cook's BBQ	Lexington, North Carolina	"Chopped Barbecue Pork Plate" – pork shoulder (rubbed with kosher salt) smoked low and slow with hickory wood for 11 hours, pulled and finely chopped topped with a sweet-tomato-based sauce (made with crushed red pepper flakes, salt, vinegar, chili powder, and ketchup), and served with fries, homemade red slaw and deep-fried hush puppies. "Chopped Barbecue Sandwich" – chopped pork topped with red slaw on a toasted bun, served with deep-fried okra.
Q39 Wood-Fried Grill & BBQ	Kansas City, Missouri	"Award Winning Spare Ribs" – pork spare ribs (rubbed with dried brown sugar, garlic salt, paprika, mustard powder, black pepper, chili powder and cumin), smoked for 2 hours with hickory, then wrapped in foil with apple juice, back in smoker for an hour, char-grilled with oak wood and slathered with homemade barbecue sauce, served with coleslaw and cornbread. "Burnt-End Burger" – grinded in-house half chuck, half brisket beef patty, seasoned with steak seasoning, char-grilled, topped with smoked beef brisket sliced burn ends, spicy pickle slaw (made with shredded cabbage, red onions, pickles, jalapeños marinated in pickle juice), served on a toasted bun.
The Bar-B-Q Shop	Memphis, Tennessee	"Pork Dry Rub Ribs" – whole rack of St. Louis-cut pork ribs (dry rubbed with chili powder, garlic, paprika and salt), smoked with hickory for 3 1/2 hours, and seasoned, served with Texas toast, baked beans and coleslaw. "Barbecue Spaghetti" – spaghetti topped with pulled pork shoulder (smoked for 12 hours) and tossed in homemade secret barbecue sauce with baked beans.
Saw's BBQ	Homewood, Alabama	"Smoked Chicken Plate" – half chicken (rubbed with garlic, salt, sugar, onion powder, cayenne, black pepper and paprika) slow-smoked on an open fire pit with green hickory wood, drizzled with Alabama white barbecue sauce (made with mayonnaise, white vinegar, signature barbecue sauce, ground pepper and salt), served with dill pickles, collard greens and mac and cheese and two slices of white bread. "Smoked Chicken Sandwich" – 1/3 pound of smoked chicken breast topped with kosher pickles, house-made white sauce on a toasted bun, served with a slice of watermelon.
D.B.A. Barbecue	Atlanta, Georgia	"Smoked Wings" – jumbo chicken wings (marinated in an apple-based brine for 24 hours, rubbed with 'red rub' consisting of mustard powder, paprika, cayenne pepper, cumin and brown sugar), smoked low and slow for two hours then deep-fried, and served with a white dipping sauce and celery.

=== Blue Plate Special ===
Restaurant	Location	Specialty(s)
24 Diner	Austin, Texas	"Texas-Style No Bean Chili" – 'a big bowl of red': chuck roast and beef brisket (seasoned with salt and pepper), pan-seared, diced, roasted in the oven, and cooked slow and low in a pot with beef fat, onions, roasted poblano, serrano and jalapeno chilies, crushed tomatoes, beer, dark chili powder, and smoked paprika, topped with shredded cheese, diced red onions, jalapenos, and green onions, served in a bowl with a piece of homemade cornbread. "Pork Belly Sandwich" – pork belly (rubbed with sugar and an 8-spice seasoning), smoked, sliced into thin-cut strips and deep-fried, served on a fresh-baked aioli-slathered toasted lobster roll topped with Asian slaw (made with red cabbage, cucumbers and vinegar).
Skylark Fine Diner & Lounge	Edison, New Jersey	"Korean Bulgogi Pork Chop" – 14-ounce center-thick-cut, bone-in pork chop, roasted in oven then sautéed with bulgogi (“meat on fire”) sauce (made with soy sauce, sesame oil, sugar, ginger, chili-garlic spice, and brown sugar), served with and kimchi basmati rice and steamed broccoli.
Cassell's Hamburgers	Koreatown, Los Angeles, California	Established in 1948: "Cassell's Patty Melt" – coarse-grind ground beef patty (seasoned with salt) and grilled on the original crossfire flattop broiler, topped with sliced American cheese (with a two crispy cheese flaps cooked on the flattop that hang off the sandwich), and caramelized onions, served between toasted seeded rye bread. "Breakfast Burger" – beef patty topped avocado with a runny fried egg, served on toasted hash brown buns.
Dove's Luncheonette	Wicker Park, Chicago, Illinois	"Burnt Ends Hash" – beef brisket (secret rub, smoked and then steamed in foil), crispy potatoes (small red potatoes, roasted then fried) tossed in a house-made aioli (made with malt vinegar powder, cheddar cheese powder, chili de arbol, capers and lemon juice), and roasted poblano peppers, topped with two fried eggs, garnished with queso fresco and scallions, and served with a side of Texas toast. "Chile Relleno" – Anaheim pepper (deep-fried, peeled and stuffed with a creamy mix of farmer’s cheese, squash blossoms, epazote, lemon juice, lemon zest and beaten eggs), dipped in tempura batter and deep-fried, served over corn puree, topped with a pickled green bean-tomato salad.
Becky's Diner	Portland, Maine	"Becky's Big Stuffed Lobster" – whole freshly caught Maine lobster, stuffed with a homemade seafood stuffing (made with butter-sautéed haddock fish, scallops and shrimp, mixed with cracker crumbs, mayonnaise, melted butter, Worcestershire sauce, and secret seasonings), roasted in the oven, served with a side of clarified butter. "Fried Clams" – clam strips (battered in all-purpose flour, corn flour, baking powder and salt, and dipped in egg wash), deep-fried and served on top of fries, served with homemade coleslaw, a lemon wedge and tartar sauce.
Steuben's Food Service	Uptown, Denver, Colorado	"Steuben's Fried Chicken" – chicken pieces (brined in buttermilk and Tabasco sauce, dredged in flour seasoned with garlic powder, onion powder, thyme and cayenne), deep-fried, topped with a chicken gravy (flour, butter, chicken stock, milk, salt and pepper), served with mashed potatoes and a homemade buttermilk biscuit. "Traffic Jam (Green Chili Cheese Fries)" – fries smothered with green chili stew (made with chunks of roasted heritage pork, onion, garlic, tomatoes, lime juice, New Mexican green chilies, beef and chicken stock) and sausage gravy, topped with melted cheddar cheese, a fried egg, bacon and green onions.
Bubby's	Tribeca, New York City, New York	"Pan-Roasted Chicken with Mac & Cheese" – half-chicken (brined for 24-hours in fresh garlic, thyme, lemon, bay leaves, peppercorns and sea-salt), oven-roasted with carrots, parsnips, potatoes, turnips, and extra virgin olive oil, then pan-roasted with skin-side down, served with homemade mac and cheese (made with shell pasta in a bacon béchamel with shredded white cheddar and topped with parsley and bacon), served and with a side of gravy. "Strawberry Rhubarb Pie" – fresh rhubarb (mixed with strawberries, sugar, and orange zest), filled in a homemade pie crust, baked and finished with powdered sugar.
Rose's Fine Food	Detroit, Michigan	"Chi-Chi Fried Rice" – cooked jasmine rice (sautéed in butter, olive oil, 'chi-chi' sauce—made with chopped garlic, chili, local maple syrup) topped with a sunny-side-up egg, chi-chi sauce pickled cabbage and sprinkled with bacon bits, spicy kimchi and eatable flowers. "Egg Sandwich" – two locally farmed sunny-side-up eggs topped with two slices of white cheddar cheese, fresh greens tossed in lemon vinaigrette, served between two slices of toasted fresh-baked sourdough bread with garlic aioli with a few pickles on the side.

=== The Meatier The Better ===
Restaurant	Location	Specialty(s)
Ditka's Steakhouse	Chicago, Illinois	Owned by former NFL coach Mike Ditka: "Coach's Meatloaf Stack" – homemade meat loaf (made from prime cuts of New York strip, rib eye and beef chuck roll, mixed with panko breadcrumbs, milk, cognac, onions, eggs and secret spices) topped with a spicy homemade barbecue sauce, baked in the oven and sliced, served stacked topped with skin-on mashed potatoes and crispy onion strings, a top a slice of grilled jalapeno cornbread, garnished with scallions and diced tomatoes. "Pot Roast Nachos" – fresh flour deep-fried tortilla chips covered in melted cheese and topped with shredded pot roast (Angus chuck roll marinated for 24-hours in a 2014 Cabernet from Ditka Vineyards, along with fresh garlic and thyme), roasted in oven for 12 hours), tomatoes, scallions and pickled jalapenos.
Taco Bamba Taqueria	Washington, D.C.	"Torta Bamba" – pork al pastor (in all-night spicy marinade), house-made grilled ground chorizo, chicken & beef milanesas (thin-sliced chicken and beef cutlets dredged in flour, egg-wash and panko crumbs), carne asada, ham and sliced hot dog, topped with pineapple chunks, shredded Monterey jack cheese, avocado, shredded lettuce, tomatoes and jalapeño between a re-fried bean spread with mayo toasted torta bun. "Taco Bamba" – grilled steak, chorizo, guacamole, cheese, chilies, pickled onion, cilantro and crispy pork skin inside two flour tortillas.
Old Major	Denver, Colorado	"Butcher's Pride Pork Chop" – a three-pound thick-cut bone-in pork chop (brined for 24-hours in a bath of kosher salt, brown sugar, thyme, coriander and mustard seed), sealed in a bag with pig lard cooked sous vide for 3-hours, seasoned with salt and pan-seared and basted with lard, sliced, drizzled with demi-glace (made from roasted pork bones) and served on a butcher block on top carrot puree with grilled asparagus and maitake mushrooms. "Nose To Tail" – a pork variety platter feathering grill pork belly, pork ribs (confit and smoked), green garlic Italian sausage, deep-fried pig ears with tater tots, and a mix carrots, parsnips, pea leaves (sautéed in butter), drizzled with demi-glace.
Butchertown Hall	Germantown, Nashville, Tennessee	"Beef Brisket Sandwich" – Texas Hill country-style Angus beef brisket (seasoned with salt and pepper), smoked with white oak for 12 hours, sliced topped with homemade barbecue sauce (made with ketchup, molasses, sriracha, and ground coffee), house-made pickles and onions, piled high on a toasted bun. "Trinity" – a half-rack of pork ribs (dry-rubbed with Tex-Mex seasoning and brown sugar), a half-pound of beef brisket and house-made smoked knockwurst sausage (a combo of pork and beef braised in stout beer with grill apples, finished on the char-grill), served on butcher paper with in-house flour tortilla and pickles and onions with barbecue sauce on the side.
Bubba's Texas Burger Shack	Houston, Texas	Home of the Buffalo Burger: "Buffalo Vegas Burger" – World Food Competition (held in Las Vegas) Award-winning buffalo burger: South Dakota ground buffalo meat patty, seasoned secret spices, grilled on flattop, topped with melted cheese, bacon, avocado, a fried egg, lettuce, tomato and house-made habanero sauce, served on a toasted bun. "Buffalo Chili Cheeseburger" – buffalo patty topped buffalo chili (made with ten pounds of ground buffalo meat mixed with diced onions, yellow, orange & green bell pepper, jalapenos, grilled on the flattop, then dried ancho chilies and tomatoes are added and stewed with beer), shredded with Monterey Jack cheese, lettuce, tomatoes and pickles on a toasted bun.
Coletta's Italian Restaurant	Memphis, Tennessee	Open since 1923: "Barbecued Pizza" – a 60-year recipe of freshly made dough covered with house-made barbecue sauce (made with tomatoes, cloves and vinegar), shredded mozzarella cheese, cooked in a pizza oven and topped with 1 1/2 pounds of house-smoked pulled pork shoulder, and drizzled with more barbecue sauce.
Deadwood Legends Steakhouse @ Silverado Franklin Hotel and Casino	Deadwood, South Dakota	"Famous Prime Rib" – a 32-ounce bone-in prime rib, (certified Angus beef prime rib, dry-aged for 28 days), wet-rubbed with veal demi-glace, dry-rubbed with salt & pepper), oven-roasted for 4 1/2 hours to a medium rare, sliced and served with a baked potato with butter and sour cream and sautéed green beans. "Buffalo Rib Eye" – locally raised buffalo bone-in rib eye (dry-age for 15–20 days), seasoned with salt and pepper, seared and buttered on a hot grill, served with their famous potatoes au gratin and seasonal vegetables.
Ben’s Best Gourmet Delicatessen	Rego Park, Queens	"Ben’s Very Best Super Spectacular" – a five meat fiesta featuring 21-day aged pastrami and corned beef (beef brisket that's pickled in spices and dry-aged), spicy garlic salami, sliced roast beef and sliced slow-roasted turkey, topped with roasted red peppers, lettuce and tomatoes layered between a soft Italian bread and a piece of seeded rye bread in the middle, held together with two large skewers, served with kosher pickles. "Rego Bark" – 100-year-old recipe: grilled hot dog, sliced in middle, stuffed with mandarin oranges, rolled in pastrami, and drizzled with spicy mustard in a toasted bun.

=== Fully Loaded ===
Restaurant	Location	Specialty(s)
The Local Post	Allandale, Austin, Texas	"Can of Nachos" – 10-pounds of nachos stacked inside a large can, poured out tableside: deep-fried tostada chips layered with beef chili (made with ground brisket and chuck, onions, peppers, chili spices, and Bloody Revolution smoked habanero sauce), topped with bacon bites, green onions and shredded cheese, baked in oven and drizzled with homemade queso (made from whole milk, American cheese, diced & juiced jalapenos, and diced red & green bell peppers). "Mexicano Chimichanga" – flour tortilla stuffed with ground beef (mixed with onions, garlic, celery, jalapenos, diced tomatoes, Worcestershire sauce, crushed red pepper flakes, cumin, dried Mexican oregano, salt, pepper and chicken stock), picadillo, shredded cheese, grilled onions and peppers), rolled and deep-fried, topped with smoky chipotle cream sauce, pico de gallo, queso fresco and jalapenos.
Sobelman's Pub & Grill	Milwaukee, Wisconsin	"The Big S.O.B. Burger" – three 1/3 pound 80/20 steak patties, grilled on the flattop, stacked and layered with 9 slices of local cheddar, Swiss and American cheese, chopped onions, jalapeños, and bacon on a toasted brioche bun. "Chicken-Fried Beast" – 80 ounce Bloody Mary cocktail topped with skewers of a 3 1/2-pound fried chicken (coated in flour and deep-fried), beer-battered deep-fried cheese curds with bits of bacon, 'baconados' (a deep-fried jalapeño cheese ball wrapped in bacon), a 'bourbonado' (grilled chicken wrapped in bacon smothered in bourbon sauce), and cheeseburger sliders, shrimp, and garnished with pickled veggies.
The Hangout Restaurant & Beach Bar	Seal Beach, California	"Double Bypass Burger" – two char-grilled 8 ounce beef patties topped with four slices of American cheese, and bacon, topped with three ladles of house-made beef chili, shredded lettuce, red onions, tomatoes and a fried egg, all layered between grilled cheese sandwich buns. "Bacon Egg Mac and Cheese Burger" – a thick grilled beef patty topped with cheese, bacon, corkscrew mac & cheese, lettuce, tomato, and a sunny-side-up egg on a toasted bun.
Nini's Deli	West Town, Chicago, Illinois	"Ropa Vieja Burrito" – flour tortilla stuffed with slow-cooked shredded beef (sirloin pressure cooked with tomatoes sauce, salt, pepper, and adobo), eggs & cheese omelet, chipotle mayo aioli, jalapeños, rice and beans, rolled and toasted in panini press. "Steak Sandwich" – thin-sliced steak (cooked in mojo sauce) layered with sautéed onions, an egg & cheese omelet, chipotle mayo, on toasted French bread.
Illegal Food	Atlanta, Georgia	"Okonomiyaki Fried" – hand-cut fries topped with garlic Japanese mayo (mixed with mirin, maggi, grated garlic and dashi—Japanese soup stock), Southeastern Asian spice sauce (made with sriracha, Korean gochujang paste, rice wine vinegar and homemade habanero powder), Okonomiyaki sauce (like a sweet Worcestershire sauce), black & white sesame seeds, pickled ginger, green onions, shredded nori, and bonito flakes, served in a massive bowl with chopsticks. "O.D.B. Burger" – one pound beef patty grilled on flattop, topped with house-cured bacon, cheese, and sunny-side-up egg in between two maple-mayo glazed donuts.
The Olde San Francisco Creamery Co.	Walnut Creek, California	"Warm and Toasty Brownie Sundae" – two scoops of O.M.G. ice cream (chocolate ice cream with a peanut butter swirl and peanut butter filled cookies) on top a warm and toasty chocolate chip brownie (made with sugar, butter, cocoa powder, ground instant coffee, vanilla, eggs and flour), a scoop of vanilla ice cream, topped with hot fudge, real whipped cream, rainbow sprinkles and a cherry. "The Kitchen Sink" – three chopped up bananas, 8 softball-sized scoops of your choice of ice cream (examples are: Moose Tracks—vanilla ice cream with fudge and peanut butter cups; Ube ice cream—Filipino purple taro root; chocolate chip ice cream, mango ice cream, mint chocolate chip and rainbow sherbet), layered with hot fudge, mini peanut butter cups, cookie crumbles, whipped cream, sprinkles, caramel sauce, nuts, chocolate chips, and cherries, served in a mini kitchen sink shaped bowl. (Kitchen Sink Challenge: If you eat the whole thing by yourself, it’s worth a free year of ice cream).
Double Wide	East Village, New York City, New York	Southern Comfort Food: "Short Rib Fritos Pie" – short rib chili (made with seared thin-sliced short rib meat, sautéed onions, jalapeno peppers, cumin, garlic powder, onion powder, smoked paprika, tomato sauce), topped with corn chips and shredded white cheddar cheese, garnished with avocado, sour cream scallions, and fresh & pickled jalapenos. "Buffalo Chicken Tots" – tater tots topped with buffalo chicken (chicken tenders marinated for 48 hours in homemade buffalo sauce, dredged in flour and deep-fried), gorgonzola and white cheddar cheese, drizzled with ranch dressing and scallions.
The Stillery	Nashville, Tennessee	Fine Shine & Good Eats: "Hot Chicken Mac and Cheese" – homemade mac and cheese (made with cavatappi corkscrew pasta, heavy cream, milk, sour cream, sharp cheddar and American cheese), topped with breadcrumbs, cooked in the oven, covered with hot chicken (boneless chicken breast double dredged in seasoned flour, deep-fried and smothered in hot chicken sauce), garnished with chives and served in a personal cast-iron skillet.

=== Meltdown ===
Restaurant	Location	Specialty(s)
Comet Café	Milwaukee, Wisconsin	"Customized Mac and Cheese" – classic mac and cheese (made with elbow pasta, heavy cream American cheese slices, butter, and shredded cheddar) you can add an optional bacon, beef, chili, honey-baked ham, peas, and tuna salad, served in a large bowl. "Tuna Mac Casserole" – mac and cheese with tuna salad (made with chunks of cooked tuna, dill, fresh parsley, capers, salt, white pepper, giardiniera pepper oil, yellow mustard and lemon), topped with shredded cheddar cheese.
EVO Pizzeria	Charleston, South Carolina	"Four Cheese Calzone" – hand-tossed pizza dough stuffed with house-made mozzarella cheese (cheese curds stretched in saltwater), sliced provolone, whole-milk ricotta, grated Parmesan cheese, and tomato sauce), cooked in a wood-fire oven. "Pork Trifecta" – hand-tossed dough topped with homemade tomato sauce, ground sausage, bacon, salami, fresh mozzarella and Parmesan cheese, garnished with sea salt and black pepper.
La Gloria	San Antonio, Texas	Street Food of Mexico: "Queso Molcajete" – fresh tomato salsa (made with blended caramelized white onion, chopped garlic, ripe Roma tomatoes, tomatillos, toasted Mexican cinnamon and chili de arbol, oregano and water) topped with shredded queso Oaxaqueno and aged Manchego cheese, served in a 500-degree traditional Mexican volcanic stone bowl with a side of totopos (stone-ground corn chips). "Quesadilla Deshebrada" – hot shredded beef (marinated in ancho adobo—dried poblano peppers, onions, oregano, piloncillo shavings—a raw spiced sugar cane, salt, and orange juice) stuffed with manchego and oaxaqueno cheeses into a house-made corn tortilla, grilled on the flattop with toasted cheese edges.
Grillcheezerie	Ann Arbor, Michigan	"S'Mac and Cheese" – Sandwich Mac and Cheese: (a béchamel of butter, flour, milk, shredded aged cheddar, gruyere, asiago cheeses, and elbow pasta; baked in the oven) in between two grilled cheese sandwiches (with four slices of American cheese). "Wing’in It" – buffalo chicken (chicken breasts roasted in the oven with oil, lemon juice and oregano), coated in homemade buffalo sauce in between a grilled cheese sandwich (with mozzarella and blue cheese on locally baked white bread), layered with potato chips.
Raclette	Lower Manhattan, New York City, New York	Alpine melted cheese: "Raclette Melted Swiss" – roasted potatoes, charcuterie, pickles and pearl onions, topped with a half a wheel of melted Swiss cheese, served tableside. "The New York" – half-pound of filet mignon (marinated for 24 hours in extra virgin olive oil, fresh garlic, shallots, and rosemary), seared in a pan of butter to a medium rare, served with a trio of sautéed mushrooms, asparagus, and roasted potatoes, topped with Alpine Swiss cheese right off the raw-wheel raclette melted under a quartz heating lamp from Switzerland.
Cheesetique	Del Ray Alexandria, Virginia	"Cheesetique Cheese Steak" – flank steak (marinated for 24 hours in a blend of garlic, red onions, Worcestershire sauce, olive oil and soy sauce), seared in a pan, chilled, sliced, finished off with more marinade, topped with sliced of melted Taleggio cheese, served on toasted ciabatta bread spread with lemon-garlic aioli.
Fondue Stube	Chicago, Illinois	The Melting Room: "Classic Swiss Cheese Fondue" – Wisconsin Swiss cheese and Switzerland Gruyere cheese cooked in a fondue pot until melted with garlic powder, white pepper, nutmeg, Chablis dry white wine; finished off with Kirschwasser (cherry brandy mixed with cornstarch), served tableside with slices of granny smith apples, various raw vegetables and a basket of warm bread cubes. "Belgium Dark Chocolate Fondue" – Belgium dark chocolate chips melted in a fondue with heavy cream, topped with a flambé of 151 rum, served fresh fruit and pound cake.
The Shepherd and the Knucklehead Pub & Steakhouse	Hoboken, New Jersey	"Chef's Pork Poutine" – hand-cut fries seasoned with salt and pepper, topped with shredded mozzarella and cheddar cheese, pork chunks seared on the flattop with carrots, onions and celery, (spiced with salt, pepper and onion powder, finished off with cinnamon, rosemary, water, red wine and brown sugar and roasted in the oven), garnished with green onions. "Bavarian Pretzel" – a giant Bavarian soft pretzel grazed with garlic butter and coarse salt, topped with a homemade cheese sauce (made with heavy cream, mozzarella and cheddar), garnished with scallions.

=== Scary Good ===
Restaurant	Location	Specialty(s)
Ghostbar at the Whitney	Detroit, Michigan	Restaurant located in the Turn of the Century haunted mansion once owned by David Whitney Jr., a lumber baron. "Absinthe Flamed Australian Lamb Chops" – Twin double-boned lamb chops marinated in olive oil, pink peppercorns, kosher salt, lemon zest, rosemary, black pepper and garlic, seared in a pan, then in oven, served on top of saffron risotto, (Arborio rice sautéed in shallots, garlic, saffron, white wine, saffron stock, whole butter, chives, salt and pepper), topped with a shot of absinthe and set aflame. "The Witching Hour" – Valentine White Blossom Vodka, Limoncello liqueur, a sugar cube, and a lemon slice, shaken and strained in a sugar-rimmed martini glass, topped with St. George raspberry liqueur and dry ice.
Rockafellas	Salem, Massachusetts	Hosts Halloween dance parties. The restaurant is haunted by the Woman in Blue (in a blue dress), believed to be Rebecca Nurse, an accused witch that was hanged in the Salem Witch Trials of 1692. She used to work here when it was a department store and go to the upstairs church (she dated the minister): "Baked Bacon Mac n' Cheese" – penne pasta topped with smoked bacon rendered in heavy cream, parmesan, Monetary Jack and farmhouse cheddar cheeses and parsley, baked golden brown with a seasoned panko crumb topping, served in a mini cast-iron skillet. "Lady in Blue" – Captain Morgan Spiced Rum, Don Q Coconut Rum, Blue Curaçao and pineapple juice, served in a short cocktail glass, garnished with an orange wedge and a cherry. "Candy Corntini" – Pinnacle Whipped Cream Vodka, pineapple juice, and grenadine, served in a short glass, topped with whipped cream and candy corn.
Muriel's Jackson Square Bistro	French Quarter, New Orleans, Louisiana	Haunted by previous owner, Pierre Antoine, who lost the house in a card game in 1814. He came back and hanged himself in one of the rooms. He has his own table downstairs with a daily glass of wine. "Muriel's Bayoubaisse" – a twist on a bouillabaisse: seafood meatballs (made with pureed Gulf shrimp, redfish, parsley, thyme, shallots, salt, pepper, heavy cream and egg whites) in a creole broth (made from onions, toasted fennel seeds, tomato paste, shrimp stock and vermouth; andouille sausage, fresh Gulf shrimp, and mussels are added, along with orzo pasta and garlic), topped with jumbo lump crabmeat sautéed with butter and green onions, garnished with micro greens. "Vampire's Kiss" – vodka, cranberry juice and jelly, lemon juice, balsamic vinegar and sugar water, shaken and strained in chilled martini glass.
Old Town Pizza	Portland, Oregon	The haunted Shanghai tunnels run right under the restaurant, where kidnappings took place. Nina is their resident ghost. "Moscow Ghoul" – vodka, ginger beer and Campari, served over ice, finished with fresh lime juice and garnished with a cherry. "Ghost Pie" – specialty pizza topped with homemade Alfredo sauce (made with garlic, butter, heavy cream, Parmesan, black pepper, nutmeg and basil), mozzarella, chicken (marinated in Old Town Pilsner), red onions, roasted red peppers, mushrooms and minced garlic. "Dragon Lady Pie" – hand-tossed pizza topped with marinara, sun-dried tomatoes, mozzarella, mushrooms, onions, artichoke hearts and capers.
The Catacombs at Bube's Brewery	Mount Joy, Pennsylvania	Catacombs run underneath the restaurant. In the late 1800s, Alois Bube's family used the catacombs to chill beer from their brewery. And some say they still do! One of their most popular ghosts is a young woman in a long dress seen in the shadows. "Bube's Duck Breast" – seared and sliced duck breast topped with a strawberry-horseradish glaze (made with fresh horseradish, strawberry jelly and water), served with rainbow string beans sautéed in duck fat and rice pilaf, and garnished with chives. "Flaming Bloody Alien Brain Hemorrhage" – peach schnapps, Baileys Irish Cream, blue curacao, and grenadine, topped off with an over-proof rum, served in a shot glass and set aflame. "Paranormal Gnocchi" – homemade gnocchi (made with potatoes, egg yolk, flour and salt) poached and chilled in water, then sautéed to a golden brown with Kalamata olives, capers, yellow and red cherry tomatoes, feta cheese and chives.
Scampo and Alibi Bar + Lounge @ The Liberty Hotel	Boston, Massachusetts	Bar is housed in the city's former drunk tank or the Jail of Suffolk County (est. October 20, 1848), which once held the Boston Strangler. "Pumpkin Ravioli with Roast Pork" – sugar pumpkin ravioli (made with roasted pumpkin, salt, pepper butter, maple sugar, mustard-cured pears, ricotta, melted butter and amaretto cookie crumbs) served with roast pork with crackling skin (from a slurry of salt, vinegar and baking soda) in a marinade (made of lemongrass, chilies, lemon zest and rendered pork fat). "Painkiller" – rum, pineapple juice, grenadine, shaken and strained in a skull glass.
Saloon No. 10 @ Deadwood Social Club Restaurant	Deadwood, South Dakota	This haunted bar is where Wild Bill Hickok was shot in the back while playing cards in 1876. "No. 10's Beef Wellington" – seared beef tenderloin wrapped in a puff pastry and stuffed with a portobello Marsala sauce (made with chopped portobello mushrooms, red wine, and dried herbs), baked in oven and topped with an onion bordelaise (made with red wine and beef demi-glace), served with a side of bourbon sweet potatoes and roasted carrots and zucchini. "Wild Boar Bundles" – jumbo wontons (filled with sautéed ground wild boar and bacon in extra virgin olive oil, red onion, carrots, celery, tomato paste, red wine, vegetable stock and milk, mixed with smoked gouda cheese), scooped into egg roll wrappers and deep-fried, place under a white wine tomato basil reduction, garnished with Parmesan.
Jekyll & Hyde Club	Greenwich Village, New York City, New York	Halloween-themed dinner theater. "Boneless Short Ribs" – seared boneless short ribs, (braised for three hours with carrots, celery, tomato paste, beef broth, herbs and red wine), served with cheesy polenta and sautéed broccoli rabe. "Good and Evil" – vodka, apple, melon liquor, and pineapple juice, served in a hurricane glass and garnished with an orange slice and a cherry. "Death by Chocolate" – chocolate cake, chocolate pudding and toffee layered in a large glass, topped with homemade whipped cream and chocolate syrup.

=== Shore Bets ===
Restaurant	Location	Specialty(s)
Rockin' Tacos Grill & Tequila Bar	Okaloosa County, Florida	"Blackened Shrimp Burrito" – Gulf shrimp (seasoned with house blend of Cajun spices), sautéed until blackened, rolled inside a house-made grilled flour tortilla with yellow rice, 'drunken' pinto beans (cooked with a shot of tequila), homemade white wine queso (made with sautéed onions, garlic, chardonnay wine, and white American cheese), topped with hot sauce, more queso, shredded cheddar cheese, and diced red jalapeños, served on a sizzling hot plate with a lime wedge. "Gator Tacos" – alligator meat (marinated in buttermilk, dredged in seasoned flour, deep-fried and seasoned with Cajun spices) inside two flour tortillas filled with broccoli slaw, drizzled with chipotle aioli, green onions and a lime.
The Crab Shack	Tybee Island, Georgia	Where the elite eat in their bare feet!: "Captain Crab's Sampler Platter" – Low country boil cooked in secret seasoned boiling water, consisting of boiled blue-lipped mussels, Louisiana crawfish, Alaskan snow crab legs, red rock crab, white shrimp, boiled red potatoes, and smoked sausage, all seasoned with house spice and served on a foiled crab basket lid with whole sweet corn-on-the cob, lemon wedges and melted butter on the side.
The Deck on Laguna Beach	Laguna Beach, California	"Cali Cooler" – jalapeños, fresh mint leaves, cucumbers (muddled together), cucumber gin and lime sour, shaken and served over ice in a short cocktail glass, topped off with ginger beer and garnished with mint and a cucumber slice. "Laguna Cioppino" – seared red snapper, crab legs, scallops, wings clams, local mussels (cooked separately with white wine) and added to the cioppino (made with sautéed celery, garlic and onions in olive oil, lemon zest, fish stock, basil, San Marzano tomatoes, heirloom tomato concasse (a tomato that's been peeled, seeded, and chopped), garnished with fennel and served in a bowl with toasted garlic bread.
Portland Lobster Co.	Portland, Maine	"Lobster Mac and Cheese" – mac and cheese (made with twisted gemelli pasta in heavy cream infused with lobster shells, strained, thinned-out with milk, roux—butter, eggs, flour, and lobster roe, and three kinds of cheese, Gruyere, Asiago and white cheddar, along with sea salt, black pepper, sweet paprika, cayenne, and white wine; mixed with lobster meat (sautéed in butter, herbs and onions), topped with breadcrumbs, baked in the oven and served with a lobster claw on top. "Lobster Stew" – bisque (made with sautéed onions, celery, garlic, butter, anchovies, lobster meat, sherry, parsley, flour, and lobster stock, finished with half & half and diced potatoes), served in a hollowed-out bread bowl.
The Spot	Galveston, Texas	"Sweet and Spicy Burger" – flattop grilled beef patty topped with melted shredded smoked chipotle Gouda cheese, homemade bacon jam (made with butter, onions, bacon, brown sugar, red wine vinegar and cayenne pepper) and hand-breaded deep-fried jalapeños, a drizzled of sweet barbecue sauce, served on a bed of shredded lettuce on a toasted bun. "Spot Dog" – an 8-ince half-pound kosher frank is split-open and grilled, topped with homemade no-bean beef chili (made with ground beef, tomato paste, tomato puree, diced onions and jalapeños, cumin, cayenne pepper, kosher salt, white pepper, garlic, beef broth and dark chili powder), grated cheddar cheese on a toasted bun, served with waffle fries.
Clam & Chowder House Restaurant at Salivar’s Dock	Montauk, New York	"Bigeye Tuna Steak" – 200-pound fresh caught tuna, sliced into a bigeye tuna steak, (seasoned with salt and pepper and seared in a hot pan to rare in middle), served with black sticky rice (forbidden black rice), edamame hummus (blended edamame, ginger, cilantro, cucumber, cumin, vinegar, lemon, sugar and kombu) and mango sauce on the side. "Sushi Pizza" – a crispy corn tortilla topped with fresh guacamole (made with avocados, lime, garlic, diced tomatoes, red onions, cilantro, and wasabi), thinly sliced sashimi bigeye tuna loin, drizzled with spicy mayo and pink peppercorns.
Marination Ma Kai	Seattle, Washington	Marinated foods at the sea from Hawaii: "Spam Slider" – seared teriyaki sauced SPAM topped with grilled kalua-pork (traditional braised Hawaiian pulled pork butt cooked in a pan lined with banana leaves, ginger, bay leaves and cloves of garlic and topped with liquid smoke and sea salt, braised in oven for five hours), signature slaw (made with green cabbage, carrots, green onions, and cilantro, mixed with pickled ginger vinaigrette) on a ‘Nunya sauce’ (nunya-business secret sauce) slathered sweet roll. "Loco Moco" – steamed white rice topped with an all-beef patty, gravy (made with soy sauce, Worcestershire sauce, onions, garlic, secret spices, bay leaves, local beer and ginger), two fried sunny-side-up eggs and green onions.
Salute! On the Beach	Key West, Florida	"Ditalini and Cheese" –mac and cheese (made with short ditalini pasta, milk, heavy cream, sea salt, fresh ground pepper, a roux of butter and flour, aged Asiago, sharp white cheddar and American cheeses), baked in the salamander and topped with local pink shrimp (sautéed scampi-style in a hot pan with garlic, salt and pepper, butter, lemon juice, and white wine, and shallots). "Antipasti Sandwich" – sliced hard salami, prosciutto Parma, fresh mozzarella, tomatoes, roasted peppers, red onions and mixed baby greens, drizzled with balsamic glaze on an extra virgin olive oil slathered freshly baked multi-grain bread.

=== Happy Hour ===
Restaurant	Location	Specialty(s)
Salty Sow	Austin, Texas	Happy Hour Special Menu: "Honey Rosemary Dipped Fried Chicken" – chicken is dredged in corn starch and 13 secret ingredients, dipped in buttermilk and whole milk, doubled fried and dunked in a honey bath (of local honey, fresh rosemary and water), served on top of "neckbone gravy" (made with seared chicken neckbones, chopped onions, carrots and celery, water, a mirepoix & roux of butter, salt, pepper, thyme, and bay leaf), and a homemade buttermilk biscuit. "Rosemary's Piglet" – pomegranate juice, simple syrup and champagne poured over one giant rosemary ice cube served in a short cocktail glass. "Candied Pork Belly" – pork belly rubbed in a savory and sweet secret spice rub called "pig candy", roasted in oven for 3 hours, served with collard greens cooked with ham hocks and house-made bacon, and topped with a balsamic soy glaze.
Murphy's Pub & Grill	Rapid City, South Dakota	Downstairs is a prohibition-era speakeasy. "Buffalo Meatloaf Sandwich" – meatloaf (made with ground buffalo, pork and beef, secret spices, panko crumbs, an egg, and Worcester sauce), stuffed with red-wine sautéed button mushrooms, covered in bacon, baked in oven, sliced and seared in a pan, topped with a bourbon ketchup sauce (made from ketchup, mustard, pepper, apple cider vinegar, molasses, brown sugar and a shot of house bourbon), heirloom tomatoes, mixed greens and fried onion strings on a toasted sourdough bun, served with a side of mashed potatoes and asparagus. "Pear Sidecar" – peach moonshine, pear vodka, lemon, lime and orange juice, brown sugar simple syrup, strained in a martini glass, garnished with a lemon wheel and dried rose petals.
Evel Pie	Las Vegas, Nevada	Happy Hour: Large Pizza & Pitcher of Beer for $20. "Hog Heaven Pizza" – hand-slapped pizza dough topped with Memphis-style barbecue sauce, whole bulbs of oregano, pure pecorino Romano cheese, shredded mozzarella and fontina chesses, slices of smoked mozzarella, house-made pulled pork, "man-candy" bacon (made with maple syrup, brown sugar and two kinds of chili flakes) and red onions, drizzled with olive oil. "Rattlesnake Pizza" – (tribute to Evel Knievel's Snake River Canyon jump) topped with tomato sauce, grande mozzarella (a blend of high butterfat cheese and skim milk cheese), caramelized Vidalia onions, peppadew peppers, and Montana rattlesnake meat blended with pork into a sausage.
Bottlefork Bar and Kitchen	River North, Chicago Illinois	"Ground Bacon Burger" – grass-fed ground beef mixed with ground bacon, grilled on a flattop with salt and pepper, topped with vermillion bleu cheese (an aged cheddar with bleu cheese veins in it), shoestring potatoes, shredded lettuce, diced tomatoes, mixed beer mustard (made with brown mustard seeds, brown sugar, turmeric, shallots, white wine, red onions, sherry vinegar, and local IPA beer), mayonnaise and homemade balsamic ketchup, served on a butter-toasted brioche bun, speared with a house-made dill pickle. "Look Out Below!" – pineapple vinegar, fresh lime and passion fruit juices, French bitters and two types of rum, finished off with Angostura coconut foam, served in a tall cocktail glass.
A.J.'s Seafood & Oyster Bar	Destin, Florida	"American Spirit Roll" – USDA prime filet mignon, chargrilled to medium rare, jumbo lump crab knuckles, avocado, jicama, and creamy aioli rolled in rice on two sheets of nori, wrapped in prosciutto, topped with eel sauce (sweetened with tupelo honey) and microgreens, garnished with a bamboo leaf and a side of wasabi. "A.J.'s House Fish Sandwich" – fresh mahi-mahi seasoned with a mix of Old Bay, Florida Bay, garlic and paprika, covered with an herb blend of Romano cheese, broiled and topped with remoulade, lettuce, tomatoes, pickles, on a butter-toasted brioche bun and served with a side house-cut fried onion rings.
La Contenta	Lower East Side, New York City, New York	"Fish Taco's" – freshwater catfish, (marinated in lime zest and three kinds of chili peppers), coated in tempura batter, and deep-fried, topped with homemade coleslaw (made with cabbage, salt, chili powder, fresh squeezed lime and orange juice), pico de gallo, chipotle aioli, serrano sauce, sour cream, and avocado salsa, on butter-grilled corn tortillas. "Queso Fundido" – a blend of goat cheese, cheddar, pepper jack and Oaxacan cheeses, roasted pablano peppers, placed in a cast-iron skillet and melted in the oven, drizzled with salsa verde, served with a side of grilled tortillas for dipping.
Cole's French Dip Sandwiches	Los Angeles, California	Founded in 1908, originators of the "French Dip". "The Big Dipper" – special cut of roast beef rubbed in signature rub (kosher salt, minced garlic, thyme, rosemary, black pepper and olive oil), slow-cooked in oven for 12 hours, sliced thin and dipped in beef au jus, topped with pepper jack cheese on a toasted hybrid French baguette, French roll with a side of au jus for dipping. "Old Fashioned" – sugar cube, bitters, soda water, muddled, whiskey is added over a big ice cube, garnished with circus zest around the glass rim and a real maraschino cherry.
The Lion's Share	San Diego, California	Happy Hour Menu (4pm-6pm): "Wild Boar Poutine" – Kennebec potato fries, topped with browned wild boar sausage (sautéed with butter flour, Worcestershire sauce, sherry vinegar, pepper sauce, and milk) and melted cheddar, garnished with fried sage. "True Blood Cocktail" – mint-infused pims, house-made raspberry syrup, lemon juice, garnished with mint, served in a short cocktail glass. "Antelope Sliders" – three grilled ground antelope patties topped with onion marmalade (red onions sautéed in cabernet wine, port wine, red wine vinegar, and fresh herbs), Gouda cheese and house-made mustard aioli on toasted mini buns.

=== Spicy ===
Restaurant	Location	Specialty(s)
Pepperfire Hot Chicken	Nashville, Tennessee	"AppleJack" –Deep-fried grilled cheese sandwich (slices of pepper jack cheese between two slices of mayo-slathered Tennessee toast, dipped in egg-wash and panko crumbs; deep-fried) topped with hot chicken (chicken tenders dipped in egg-wash and seasoned flour, deep-fried and covered in 'Double X' secret hot sauce) covered in hot apples, served in a basket with collard greens, fried okra and crinkle fries.
Hopdoddy Burger Bar	Austin, Texas	"Ghostland Burgatory" – an angus beef patty (mixture of chuck and brisket), grilled on the flattop and topped with two slices of ghost chili pepper jack cheese, homemade ghost chili sauce (made from ghost chili peppers, scorpion chili, Carolina reaper chili, jalapeño, serrano, and habanero chilies blended with onions, garlic and tomato puree), lettuce, tomatoes and sliced chilies on a chipotle mayo toasted bun. (You need to sign a waiver to eat one!) "El Diablo" – an angus beef patty topped with pepper jack cheese, caramelized onions and salsa roja (made with jalapeños, serranos and chipotle puree) on a toasted bun.
East Coast Grill	Cambridge, Massachusetts	"Hellacious Sausage Bomb" – house-made sausage (made with pork shoulder, Scotch bonnet peppers, and spicy spices; cased and wood-smoked), char-grilled and topped with ‘inner beauty’ hot sauce (made with Scotch bonnets, yellow mustard, fruit juices, sugar, and traditional Caribbean spices), sautéed onions and peppers, served on a toasted sweet potato roll with fries and pickles. "Jerk Wings From Hell" – chicken wings (coated in a 24-hour Jerk marinade made with Scotch bonnets, ginger, scallions, garlic, nutmeg, allspice and thyme), smoked for two hours and char-grilled, tossed in inner beauty hot sauce, served with guava-banana ketchup (made with Jerk rub, onions, guava, tomatoes, pineapple, and bananas).
Wing King	Las Vegas, Nevada	"Chicken Wings with Hell Sauce" – deep-fried free-range jumbo chicken wings covered in ‘Hell Sauce’ (made with Trinidad Scorpion peppers, Carolina Reaper peppers, ghost peppers, salt, cayenne, vinegar, and 9 million Scoville-unit extract—volcanic Hawaii pumice). "Pork Wings" – four deep-fried 4-ounce pork wings covered in a spicy strawberry cheesecake sauce (made with strawberry preserves, cayenne, cinnamon, vanilla yogurt, and 9 million Scoville extract).
Allan's Authentic Mexican Restaurant	Portland, Oregon	"Camarones Alla Diablo" – boiled butterfly shrimp with bell peppers, mushrooms, and habaneros, sautéed in butter with parsley and cumin), topped with 'salsa universal' (made with California guajillo peppers, onions, garlic, bay leaves and secret spices). "El Diablo Burrito" – flour tortilla stuffed with strip steak (marinade in oil, salt and pepper), sautéed pequin, Morita, dried peppers, beans, cheese and salsa universal, covered in a spicy sauce (made with jalapeños, serranos, habaneros, and ghost peppers), garnished with jalapeño horns. (If you finished this in 10 minutes, you get a free T-shirt. Finish it in a new record time; you get the free shirt, a hand-blown flame glass trophy and regular burritos for a whole year!)
Brick Lane Curry House	East Village, New York City, New York	"Shrimp Vindaloo" – tiger prawns cooked in a red curry puree (made with Kashmiri chili, coriander seeds, cumin seeds, fennel seeds, peppercorns, cloves, star anise, cinnamon, cardamom, bay leaves, ginger, garlic, and white vinegar). "Chicken Phaal" – chicken breasts in a spicy sauce (made with ginger, garlic, red pepper flakes, dry red chilies, fresh green chilies, vindaloo paste, habaneros, Carolina reaper chili puree).
Big G's Pizza by the Slice	Chicago, Illinois	"Dance with El Diablo" – hand-tossed dough topped with spicy marinara (made with ground tomatoes, pizza sauce, and secret Mexican hot sauce), shredded mozzarella cheese, spicy chicken (marinated with secret hot sauce), chilies toreadoes (or grilled jalapeños and habaneros, sliced and tossed with oil, salt and lemon juice), shredded Havarti cheese, and a drizzle of 'diablo sauce' (made with chipotle peppers, mayonnaise, charred jalapeños, red and white vinegar, salt and garlic powder). "Spicy Gamez" – a pizza and quesadilla mash-up: cornmeal pizza dough topped with mozzarella cheese, crème fraiche, buffalo chicken chunks, covered with more dough, seasoned with cracked black pepper and oregano, baked in the oven, topped with Wisconsin cheddar cheese.
Georgia Boys BBQ	Longmont, Colorado	"Barbecued Pork Tacos with Ghost Sauce" – three flour tortillas stuffed with hand-pulled apple and hickory smoked pork butt, topped with cilantro-lime slaw (made with shredded cabbage, radicchio, chopped cilantro, cumin, ancho chili powder, lime juice, apple cider vinegar, and thinly sliced red onions), drizzled with avocado ranch and ‘ghost sauce’ (made with Fresno, serrano, Anaheim and habanero chilies, ghost chili powder, Chimayo and habanero chili powders, ketchup, apple cider vinegar and apple juice).

=== Hotel Hot Spots ===
Restaurant	Location	Specialty(s)
Appalachian Bistro @ Dancing Bear Lodge	Townsend, Tennessee	"Pork Osso Buco" – braised pork shank (rubbed with cayenne, chipotle and smoked paprika, seared in ‘meat butter’ with purple carrots, red onions and green herbs, deglazed with a shot of Tennessee bourbon), served with collard greens (sautéed in orange juice, salt, pepper, ginger and peanuts), and 'dirty rice' (made with wild rice, ham bits, sausage, onions and spicy tomato paste). "Country Fried Hen" – half a hen (brined in sweet tea, lemon and bay leaves, dredged in seasoned flour, dipped in buttermilk, and coated in cornflakes, deep-fried), served on a bed of potato salad (made with sweet potatoes, cream cheese, red onions, and scrambled eggs), topped with veggies from the garden.
King’s Highway Diner & Lounge @ Ace Hotel & Swim Club	Palm Springs, California	"Cemita Las Palmas" – Mexican torta (club sandwich): Jidori chicken breasts (battered in Mexican spices and dipped in buttermilk, deep-fried), topped with citrus salad (made from mixed green, herbs and Meyer lemons), re-fried beans, guacamole, chipotle peppers, and shredded Oaxaca cheese, served on a lemon-mayo slathered sesame seed bun. "Orange Carnitas Tacos" – pork (cured in cinnamon sticks, thyme, salt, pepper, and orange juice; grilled on the flattop), topped with pinto beans, and cactus salsa, served on two corn tortillas.
1886 Café & Bakery @ Driskill Hotel	Austin, Texas	"Hangover Burger" – Wagyu beef patty (seasoned with salt and pepper; char-grilled), topped with shredded smoked cheddar cheese, buttered hash browns, two slices of thick-cut candied bacon (coated in sugar and spices), and a sunny-side-up fried egg, served on a toasted brioche bun. "Croque Madame" – grilled ham topped with melted Gruyere cheese on brioche toast, smothered in mornay sauce (made with heavy cream, shredded pepper Jack cheese and Gruyere cheese), topped with a fried egg and garnished with micro greens.
Tonga Room @ Fairmont Hotel	San Francisco, California	A tiki bar designed in the 1940s with a pool in the middle with rain and lighting: "Dungeness Chili Crab" – a whole local Dungeness crab (cracked and quartered, dredged in egg-wash and seasoned flour; quick-fried in soybean oil), topped with a sweet & spicy chili sauce (made from sautéed fresh garlic, ginger, green onions, diced bell peppers, ketchup, chili sauce, an egg, and sambal; de-glazed with Shaoxing Chinese wine). "Rainmaker" – three different kinds of rum, pineapple juice, orange juice, lemon juice, and liqueurs, served in a massive tiki punch bowl, garnished with orange slices, a skewer of black cherries and cocktail umbrellas. "Char Siu Ribs" – half a rack of pork ribs (traditional Chinese barbecue char = fork, siu = pork), (marinated for 36 hours, in sugar, cinnamon, ginger, Korean kam chow powder, soy sauce, hoisin sauce, chu sing, sesame oil, an egg and wine), baked for 2 hours in oven, topped with black & white sesame seed and served with plum sauce.
Southernmost Beach Café @ Southernmost Beach Resort	Key West, Florida	"Drunken Scallops" – four jumbo sea scallops (seasoned with salt &pepper, sautéed in duck fat), topped with 'drunken sauce' (made from duck fat, garlic, shallots, Applewood-smoked bacon bits, seasonal cider beer, butter, heavy cream and Parmesan cheese), served with Yukon gold mashed potatoes (made with Yukon gold potatoes mashed with Maine lobster claws), garnished with green onions. "Key Lime Pie Margarita" – key lime liqueur, key lime tequila, triple sec, and sour mix, served over ice in a graham cracker crust rimmed tall cocktail glass, garnished with a lime slice.
The Surf Lodge Restaurant @ The Surf Lodge	Montauk, New York	"Sea Urchin Linguine" – boiled linguine pasta topped with buttered whole sea urchin in a sauce (made with dashi—Japanese cooking stock, kombu—dried kelp, bonito flakes, toasted green nori powder, French cream butter, chopped sea urchin, soy sauce, sesame oil and sweet rice wine), garnished with local crab meat and micro daikon radish.
The Attic @ Salish Lodge & Spa	Snoqualmie, Washington	Great Northern Hotel from Twin Peaks: "Northwest Style Cheesesteak" – tri-tip (seasoned with herbs from the garden, char-grilled to medium-rare and thinly sliced, sautéed with vegetables and melted shredded smoked white cheddar cheese), topped with grilled onions and peppers, drizzled with crème fraîche (made with horseradish and whole-grain mustard), served on a toasted roll, garnished with parsley, served with potato chips. "Dale Cooper" – dry honey cider made with honey from their own apiary. "Hawaiian Pizza" – hand-tossed dough topped with tomato sauce, whole-milk mozzarella, fresh pineapple chunks, artisan ham, and shaved Parmesan-Reggiano cheese, and basil, drizzled with honey, cooked in a wood-fire oven.
La Plazuela @ La Fonda on the Plaza	Santa Fe, New Mexico	"Green Chili Meatloaf" – meatloaf (made with ground beef and ground pork, white raisins, eggs, herbs and breadcrumbs, sautéed onions, green chilies, and pinons—pine nuts), formed into a loaf, baked in oven, and sliced, topped with a glaze (made from ketchup, adobe sauce, brown sugar and cumin), served on top of a zesty tomato sauce, roasted garlic buttermilk mashed potatoes, and grilled asparagus.

=== Open 24 Hours ===
Restaurant	Location	Specialty(s)
Marina Variety Store Restaurant	Charleston, South Carolina	"Country Style Benedict" – country-fried steak (battered in egg-wash and seasoned flour; deep-fried), topped with country gravy (made from butter, flour, cream, five-pepper spice blend, crushed black pepper, and ground sausage), and poached eggs, served on white toast. "Bloody Mary" – a local brew of small-batch vodka, tomato squeezing, garnished with a strip of peppered-bacon, okra, green olives and shrimp. "Crab Stuffed Fried Green Tomato, Shrimp & Grits" – two sliced green tomatoes (smashed with homemade crab cakes, double-dredged in egg-wash and seasoned flour; deep-fried), served with local shrimp (sautéed in butter and house seasoning), and a scoop of house-made grits.
UrbanBelly	Chicago, Illinois	"Phat Noodles" – Thai lemongrass chicken (ground chicken thigh meat sautéed in oil with lemon grass, garlic, ginger, Napa cabbage, curry powder, fish sauce, sweet chili, and kaffir lime), Korean beef (made with thinly sliced rib-eye beef marinated in a blend of brown sugar, kiwi, Asian pears, garlic, onions, soy sauce, and sesame oil; sautéed in sesame oil with shredded carrots and bean sprouts), and pork belly on top of noodles (thin rice noodles sautéed with eggs, kimchi, curry and arugula), topped with fresh pineapple, served in a bowl garnished with scallions. "Beef and Cheddar Dumplings" – ground beef and cheese (mixed with spices, ketchup and Dijon mustard), stuffed into six pieces of wonton wrapper and deep-fried, served a special sauce (made with mustard and horseradish), garnished with pickled red onions.
Seoul Taco (Food Truck)	St. Louis, Missouri	"Spicy Pork Taco" – thinly sliced premium pork belly (marinated for 24 hours in red chili flakes, Korean gochujang sauce, sugar, ginger, sesame oil, soy sauce and Soju—Korean wine), grilled on the flattop and topped with mixed greens and secret 'Seoul Sauce', sesame seeds and green onions, on two toasted flour tortillas. "Bulgogi Quesadilla" – Korean marinated grilled steak layered between two grilled flour tortillas with melted shredded cheddar cheese, topped with Seoul Sauce and wasabi sour cream.
Appaloosa Grill	Denver, Colorado	"Mac n' Bison Sausage" – homemade mac and cheese (made with 'rooster comb' pasta in a cheese sauce of butter, flour, sweet onions, white wine, milk, cream, slow-roasted garlic, four cheeses: shredded cheddar, cream cheese, fontina and parmesan, and topped with pancetta and breadcrumbs; baked in a ramekin) and served with grilled bison sausage (a mixture of bison and pork with Pueblo green chilies and chipotle peppers), garnished with a side of stone-ground mustard and house-made pickles, served on a natural wood butcher block. "Chile Rellano Roll" – roasted Pueblo chilies (stuffed with a mix of chili powder, cumin and shredded white cheese; then rolled into a wonton wrapper; deep-fried), topped with green chile (made with smoked tomatillos and onions), drizzled with cilantro sour cream, more cheese and pico de gallo.
The Sunset Beach Bar & Restaurant	Malibu, California	"Seafood Risotto" – risotto (made with imported Arborio rice, calamari, white Mexican shrimp, sautéed in olive oil, fresh garlic, parsley, vino, basil, diced tomatoes and vegetable stock), topped with a seared Maine driver scallop, Manila clams and Prince Edward Island mussels. "Chicken Milanese" – pounded thinly sliced chicken breasts (coated in flour, egg-wash and panko crumbs; pan-fried) and served with fresh wild arugula, and heirloom tomatoes (tossed with olive oil, salt and pepper).
Palomino	San Francisco, California	"Almond-Crusted Limoncello Cake" – house-made limoncello cake (made from sugar, butter, vanilla, lemon juice, lemon zest, flour milk, and meringue; caked rolled in limoncello syrup and slivered toasted almonds), topped with cream cheese frosting, served on top of lemon curd with a scoop of blueberry gelato, garnished with fresh blueberries.
Freedom Beat American Tastes & Tunes @ Downtown Grand Hotel	Las Vegas, Nevada	"Loaded Fries" – hand-cut Idaho potato fries tossed in salt and parsley, topped with pulled pork butt and Texas-cut chopped beef brisket (rubbed with brown sugar, salt, pepper, granulated garlic, dried mustard and Spanish paprika; smoked for 16 hours) with cheddar cheese sauce (made with two-pounds of shredded Wisconsin cheddar cheese, heavy cream, and butter), house-made barbecue sauce (made with apple cider vinegar, spices and apple juice) and green onions. "Hanky Panky" – gin, mixed with sweet vermouth and fernet bitters, served in an orange peel rim-kissed glass.
The Beehive Café	Bristol, Rhode Island	"Rosemary Biscuit" – two homemade rosemary biscuits, toasted in butter on the flattop and covered in a cheese sauce (made from garlic butter, heavy cream, local ricotta, shredded mozzarella, cheddar cheese and Romano cheese), served with grilled heirloom tomatoes, micro-greens and two poached eggs, garnished with fresh parsley. "Banana Bread French Toast" – thick-slices of house-made banana bread (soaked in a French brandy batter), toasted in butter, topped with powdered sugar, cinnamon, fresh strawberries, sliced bananas, and whipped cream, drizzled with Vermont maple syrup.
