= Food Paradise season 11 =

Food Paradise
- Season 11
- No. of episodes: 15

Release
- Original network: Travel Channel
- Original release: May 21 – August 20, 2017

Season chronology
- ← Previous; Season 10 Next → Season 12

The eleventh season of Food Paradise, an American food reality television series narrated by Jess Blaze Snider (formally Mason Pettit) on the Travel Channel, premiered on May 21, 2017. First-run episodes of the series aired in the United States on the Travel Channel on Mondays at 10:00 p.m. EDT. The season contained 15 episodes and concluded airing on August 20, 2017.

Food Paradise features the best places to find various cuisines at food locations across America. Each episode focuses on a certain type of restaurant, such as "Diners", "Bars", "Drive-Thrus" or "Breakfast" places that people go to find a certain food specialty.

== Episodes ==
- Note: These episodes aired from May 21 – August 20, 2017.

=== Lay It on Thick ===
Restaurant	Location	Specialty(s)
Dos Chinos Latin Asian Grub @ 4th Street Market	Santa Ana, California	Secret Menu Item: "The Lobster Elote" – deep-fried whole lobster, split in half, topped with garlic aioli (infused with fish sauce), shredded Monterrey jack cheese, elote (sweet grilled corn), baked in the oven and garnished with deep-fried dehydrated shallots and deep-fried scallions, and sprinkled with cayenne pepper, cilantro and lime juice. Award-winning: "Irvine Shrimp Taco" – deep-fried battered shrimp layered with shredded purple cabbage, topped with a sauce (made from mayo, duce de leche, and Vietnamese fish sauce), sprinkled with chili & lime chopped walnuts, raw chopped white onions and minced cilantro on a double flour tortilla.
Isles Bun & Coffee	Minneapolis, Minnesota	"Isles' Cinnamon Bun" – massive cinnamon bun made with buttermilk dough layered with butter, cinnamon, rolled up, sliced and baked in oven, topped with vanilla cream cheese frosting (made with butter, cream cheese, powdered sugar and vanilla), served with a side of extra frosting. "Carmel Pecan Sticky Buns" – the same cinnamon bun coated in sweet, crunchy pecans, and layered with liquefied caramel sauce.
Crisp	Chicago, Illinois	Korean-style chicken wings: "Jay’s Crisp Barbecue Wings" – brined for 24 hours in salt, sugar, secret spices and water, battered in buttermilk and double-fried in a pressure-fryer and then an open fryer, tossed in gochujang (a Korean sauce made with soy sauce and sesame oil and secret spices), and sprinkled with sesame seeds.
Emmy Squared	Williamsburg, Brooklyn, New York	"Margherita Pizza" – Detroit-inspired square pan pizza cooked in rectangle pans: a pound of dough topped with shredded mozzarella cheese, homemade tomato sauce laid out in stripes, grated pecorino, baked in a conveyor belt oven, garnished with burrata cheese, fresh basil and a drizzle of olive oil. "Le Big Matt Burger" – thin gourmet beef patties sprinkled with salt and grilled on a flattop, stacked, topped with white American cheese slices, mizuna, and pickles, slathered with house special 'Sammy Sauce' (made with Indonesian sambal and aioli), on a butter-toasted pretzel bun.
The Bang Candy Company	Nashville, Tennessee	"Rose Cardamom S'mores" – marshmallows (made with special syrup, gelatin and water, flavored with cardamom, beet juice, vanilla extract, and rose water), laid out on a sheet pan, baked and covered in powder sugar and cornstarch, cut into inch squares, toasted and sandwiched between two homemade shortbread cookies sandwich spread with liquefied, tempered dark chocolate. "Maple Bacon Bourbon Marshmallows" – homemade bourbon marshmallows half-coated with dark chocolate and topped with candy bacon.
Burro Cheese Kitchen	Austin, Texas	"The Waylon and Willie" – (named after country music greats Waylon Jennings and Willie Nelson): a gourmet grilled cheese sandwich two slices of sourdough bread layered with 'crack sauce' ( made with blended with eight strips of bacon, jalapeños, cream cheese, plain unsweetened yogurt, and grade A maple syrup), rosemary-caramelized onions, diced pepperoncini and aged shredded cheddar and gouda cheese that's melted with a torch, and grilled in a panini press. "Burnin' Mac" – grilled cheese stuffed with homemade spicy 'muchacho mac & cheese' topped with aged cheddar and provolone on panini-pressed bread with habanero hot sauce.
Hat Yai	Portland, Oregon	Southern Thai soul food: "Melayu Style Curry" – a rich and thick sauce that starts with a curry paste made from an array of spices (smashed the old-fashioned way in a mortar and pestle: flake salt, dried chilies, lemongrass, galangal, cilantro stems, garlic, shallots, and shrimp paste and secret spices), cooked with coconut cream, fish sauce, and sugar, poured in a bowl and served with fried chicken (brined in Thai spices and double-fired) and hand-rolled roti (a flaky, flat fry bread made with butter and sweet condensed milk).
Rise n°2	Houston, Texas	"Jambon et Gruyére" – a savory soufflé (ham and cheese), a Mornay sauce (a classic French cheese sauce made from gruyere, Parmesan, nutmeg, salt, pepper, 40 egg yolks, Italian-style ham and egg whites), baked in a high-tech oven, and served in a ramekin lined with butter and grated Parmesan. "Chocolate Soufflé" – made with milk chocolate, cocoa powder, pastry cream and egg whites, accompanied by chocolate anglais.

=== Handheld Happiness ===
Restaurant	Location	Specialty(s)
Hattie B's	Nashville, Tennessee	Hot Fried Chicken
Hubcap Grill	Houston, Texas	Sticky Sliders
Hola Arepa	Minneapolis, Minnesota	Shredded Beef with Plantain Arepa, Slow Roasted Pork Arepa
The Angry Crab	Chicago, Illinois	"Cajun Seafood" – served in a bag.
Valentina's Tex Mex BBQ	Austin, Texas	Smoked Brisket Tacos, Real Deal Holyfield
The Loop	Little Saigon, Orange County, Westminster, California	Loop Shaped Churros
Sticky's Finger Joint	Hell's Kitchen, Manhattan, New York City	Chicken Fingers
Pokpok	Portland, Oregon	Fish Sauce Wings, Thai Style Baby Rack Ribs

=== Carb Overload ===
Restaurant	Location	Specialty(s)
Burnt Crumbs @ Lot 579 Gourmet Market	Huntington Beach, California	"Spaghetti Grilled Cheese" – spaghetti topped with tomato sauce (made with tomatoes, whole basil, and ground black angus beef) mixed with shredded mozzarella cheese, placed on a tray and baked in oven, cut into squares and tucked into a grilled cheese (made with two slices of mozzarella) on butter-toasted sourdough bread.
Jinny's Pizzeria @ 4th Street Market	Santa Ana, California	"Spaghetti and Meatball Pizza" – 18-inch stretched dough with a garlic herb oil (garlic, bay leaves, lemon peels, chili flakes and basil) crust, topped with tomato sauce mixed with spaghetti, homemade meatballs (made with ground beef, bread, buttermilk, eggs, olive oil, parsley and Parmesan cheese), and mozzarella cheese, garnished with fresh basil and Parmesan cheese.
Gnarly Knots Pretzel Co.	Winfield, Illinois	"Chocolate Chip Cookie Dough Stuffed Pretzel" – dough (made with flour, sugar, water, salt, yeast and butter), stuffed with cookie dough (mixed with chocolate chips and homemade twice-baked salty pretzel chips), twisted into a pretzel shape, placed into a food-grade lye bath, salted and baked in the oven to a golden brown. "Birthday Cake Stuffed Pretzel" – a jumbo soft pretzel stuffed with a vanilla confetti cake (mixed with freshly made vanilla frosting), baked and topped with chocolate frosting and rainbow sprinkles.
Blue Star Donuts	Pearl District, Portland, Oregon	"Sweet Potato Fritter" – brioche dough (made with flour, yeast, salt, sugar, eggs, milk and butter—Grand Marnier orange liquor and ground mace is added), chopped into small chunks, combined with shredded and pureed sweet potatoes, brown sugar, and a five-spice mix (fennel, black pepper, star anise, cinnamon, and cloves), shaped into fritters and deep-fried, topped with a brown butter glaze (brown butter base sweetened with jumbo marshmallows, heavy cream, and powdered sugar) and garnished with mini marshmallows. "Bacon Bourbon Breakfast Fritter" – fritter dough (combined with maple-candied bacon crumbles, shredded and mashed Yukon potatoes, and five spice), deep-fried and topped with maple bourbon glaze (made with powdered sugar, bourbon, maple syrup, and water).
Jacob's Pickles	Upper West Side, New York City, New York	"Buffalo Chicken Mac and Cheese" – penne pasta poured onto a sauce of cheddar, American and pecorino cheeses (mixed with butter, flour and heavy cream), combined with shredded cheddar and mozzarella, and signature spicy buffalo sauce (made with distilled vinegar and arbol chilies), chunks of double-breaded buttermilk chicken breasts, baked in the oven and served in a personal cast-iron skillet. "Chicken and Pancakes" – double breaded southern-fried chicken breasts piled high onto two big buttermilk pancakes (made with buttermilk, eggs, flour, sugar, baking powder and salt), topped with clover honey and sprinkled with crispy bacon bits.
Eggy's Diner	Minneapolis, Minnesota	"Crunchy French Toast" – thick-cut slices of challah bread spread with peanut butter, dredged in a French toast mix (brown sugar, cinnamon, vanilla extract, heavy cream and eggs), rolled in corn flakes, browned on a griddle, and topped with cinnamon-sugar bananas, strawberries, chocolate hazelnut spread and powdered sugar. "Cinnamon Roll Pancakes" – two pancakes swirled in cinnamon, sugar and chopped pecans while on the griddle, spread with mascarpone brown sugar-cinnamon filling, rolled, cut and served standing up and sprinkled with more chopped pecans and cinnamon-sugar.
The Flipside	12th South, Nashville, Tennessee	21 varieties of "Jack's Best Chicken" – Deep-fried chicken culets named after owner's son Jack. 6-ounce chicken breast, pounded thin. Seasoned with salt, pepper, garlic and onion powder, dunked in egg wash, and dredged in thick coating of Italian breadcrumbs, deep-fried in a cast-iron skillet. "Mac Daddy" – Jack's chicken topped with homemade chili (made with ground beef, garlic, onion, seasoned with garlic powder, onion powder, chili powder, and cumin, pureed tomatoes and tomato paste, local IPA beer, dark chocolate, and kidney beans) and mac & cheese (made with cubes of American cheddar and Monterey Jack cheese is mixed with whole milk, blended with pasta shells), served with a side of fries. "The Scooter" – Jack's chicken topped with their tater tot nacho appetizer (tater tots mixed with chunks of avocado, diced tomatoes, and pickled jalapeños, drizzled with warm cheese sauce and a squirt of buffalo sauce.
Wholy Bagel	Austin, Texas	"Everything Bagels" – bagels made from (high-gluten flour, yeast, malt, warm water, and salt), shaped into bagel forms, boiled in hot water for 30 seconds, topped with dehydrated onions, garlic, salt and poppy seeds, then baked in oven. "Pork Roll Egg and Cheese Breakfast Bagel" – an everything bagel with Taylor Ham or pork roll, one organic egg over easy, and covered with melted cheese. "Texas Loaded" – cream cheese (mixed with cayenne, paprika, salt, pepper, green onions, cheddar cheese and bacon bits) smeared on an everything bagel.

=== Donut Shop ===
Restaurant	Location	Specialty(s)
Glam Doll Donuts	Eat Street, Minneapolis, Minnesota	"Hot Chick Chicken and Waffles Donut" – deep-fried potato doughnuts, dipped in a sweet maple glaze, smashed with a waffle iron, and topped with chicken thighs (seasoned with cayenne pepper and floured with potato flakes), deep-fried and drizzled with more sweet maple glaze. "Glam Slammy Donut Sammie" – two slices of thick bacon, scrambled eggs and a slice of American cheese on a glazed doughnut.
Broad Street Dough Co.	Ocean Township, New Jersey	"Antonia" – triple-tiered rainbow cake doughnuts (red, white and green food colorings), deep-fried and layered with cannoli filling (with chocolate chips), topped with house-made milk chocolate, a drizzle of crushed cannoli shells and powdered sugar. "Cookie Monster" – a blue cake doughnut covered in warm vanilla glaze, topped with crumbled chocolate cream cookies, raw cookie dough, and drizzled with milk chocolate and white chocolate.
Five Daughters Bakery	Nashville, Tennessee	"100 Layer Popcorn Caramel Croissant Doughnut" – 135 layers of croissant-style dough and sheets of butter, hand-cut, deep-fried and topped with a popcorn glaze (made from popped popcorn, drizzled with melted butter, salt, warm milk, strained and water and sugar are added), drizzled with caramel and garnished with popped sorghum seeds (baby popcorn).
Hugs & Donuts	Houston, Texas	"Brisket Donut Sandwich" – 12-pound smoked beef brisket (with special spice rub, mustard and pickle juice) from local pitmaster, Willow’s Texas BBQ, sliced, topped with onions, pickles and served on a deep-fried glazed jalapeño cheddar donut buns. "Roast Turkey Doughnut Sandwich" – thin slices of oven roast turkey and prosciutto, topped with arugula, tomatoes, pickled onions, fig jam (made with a blend of figs, vanilla and sugar), melted brie cheese on a black pepper-Parmesan doughnut bun.
Firecakes Donuts	Chicago, Illinois	Known for their Buttermilk Old-Fashioned Doughnuts: "Peach Cobbler Ice Cream Doughnut Sandwich" – a deep-fried wildflower honey-glazed yeast rectangle doughnut covered with sweet cobbler crust (made from crumbled old fashioned doughnuts, almond praline crumble and candied almonds), surrounding a homemade bar of peach puree ice cream, and finished with a drizzle of bourbon caramel.
180 Xurros & Xocolata	Portland, Oregon	"Xurros" – homemade Churros (Spanish-style fried dough made with imported flour from Spain, mixed with hot water and salt), shaped into thin, long ridges, dusted with cinnamon-sugar and served with sweet dipping sauces. "Chocolate Covered Xurros" – dipped in a semi-sweet chocolate and sprinkled with flake sea salt. "Xurro Relleno" – bite-sized churros stuffed with crema catalana (creamy custard made with fresh vanilla beans, lemon and orange zest), dipped in sugar and torched into a sugary shell, served with a side of chocolate sauce.
Baker Miller	Chicago, Illinois	Home of Doughboys (a baked doughnut with sweet roll dough that's baked in a muffin tin, dipped in butter and rolled in sugar): "French Onion Soup Doughboy" – a sourdough doughboy, dunked in melted butter, rolled in a blend of Asiago and Parmesan cheeses, stuffed with caramelized onion filling (made with cooked down sweet onions and gruyere cheese), and topped with melted smoked gruyere. "Cookies and Cream Doughboy" – a butter-soaked doughboy rolled in crushed chocolate cream cookies, stuffed with vanilla bean cream cheese frosting and drizzled with melted white chocolate.
Gourdough's Public House	Austin, Texas	"Ron Burgundy Doughnut Burger" – a 1/3-pound all-beef grilled patty, topped with two slices of American cheese, crispy bacon, a runny fried egg, tomatoes, cilantro, spicy guacamole and mayo, served on two savory yeast deep-fried doughnuts (insider tip: you can ask for glazed doughnuts). "Dirty South" – ½-pound cube steak, dredged in flour and secret spices, chicken-fried, topped with a fried mashed potato pancake, smothered in white gravy and cranberry habanero jam, sprinkled with parsley, and served on top of a doughnut.

=== Keepin' It Retro ===
Restaurant	Location	Specialty(s)
Cori's Dog House	Nashville, Tennessee	38 choices of hot dog inspired by destinations across the country: Eat your way through all 38 stops across the USA on Cori's map and get your picture on the Wall of Wieners. "Tennessee Dog" – 7-inch 1/5 of a pound all-beef hotdog, grilled on the flattop with a split down the middle, topped with yellow mustard, neon-green relish, Cincinnati-style beef chili (made with chocolate and cinnamon), homemade slaw (made with shredded cabbage and carrots, raw red onions, dried cranberries, mayonnaise, sugar, apple cider vinegar and Australian chipotle spice) and chopped raw white onions, on a butter-toasted New England–style split top bun. "Memphis Dog" – grilled hotdog topped with barbecue sauce, chopped bacon, two scoops of signature coleslaw, and grilled onions on a butter-toasted bun.
Brooklyn Farmacy & Soda Fountain	Brooklyn, New York	"99 Problems Sundae" – two scoops of chocolate ice cream topped with a hand-churned vanilla milkshake drizzled with homemade chocolate shell sauce (made from coconut oil and chocolate chips) and homemade whipped cream, sprinkled with chocolate dust and garnished with a cherry, served on top of a warm brownie (made with butter, chocolate, brown sugar, flour, eggs and vanilla paste). "Downside Up" – a scoop of toffee-crunch ice cream topped with pineapple compote, another scoop, and a deconstructed upside down pineapple cake (warm vanilla cake covered in warm caramel sauce) topped with whipped cream and a cherry.
Kenny & Ziggy's Delicatessen Restaurant	Houston, Texas	"The Zellagabetsky" – ("The Sandwich That’s Bigger Than Its Name") – an eight-decker on special rye bread cut, layered with corned beef, pastrami, salami, turkey, roast beef, tongue, Swiss cheese, coleslaw, Russian dressing, and red sweet peppers. (Challenge: If one person can finish this 3 1/2 pound sandwich without help, they will throw in a piece of cheese cake for free!)
Louie Mueller Barbecue	Taylor, Texas	"Beef Brisket" – 60-year-old recipe: pounded beef brisket rubbed with cracked black pepper and iodized salt, slow-smoked for 16–18 hours with local wood, sliced and served two ways; the flat (a lean section) and the point (a marbled, fatty end), served on butcher paper. "Beef Ribs" – salt & pepper rubbed, smoked for 10 hours; one portion serves 3 to 4 people.
Hi-Lo Diner	Minneapolis, Minnesota	"High Tops" – a fluffy puff of deep-fried doughnut-like dough (mix between focaccia, pizza dough and doughnut dough) topped with savory and sweet concoctions. "Gary Cooper High Top" – topped with fried chicken (chicken tenders in a brine of 12 hours in buttermilk, seasoned with salt, sugar, crushed red chili flakes, rosemary and habaneros), dredged in seasoned flour, buttermilk, and cornflakes (seasoned with ground pepper, kosher salt, cayenne pepper, and garlic powder), deep-fried and served on glazed high top dough topped with maple syrup, country gravy and micro greens.
Duke's Drive-In	Bridgeview, Illinois	Since 1975: "Italian Beef Sandwich"– braised and brown beef (cooked in water with salt, pepper and oregano), trimmed, sliced paper-thin, simmered in its own beef juice gravy, topped with sautéed green sweet peppers and jardinière (made with chopped green bell peppers and spices; marinated in oil), served on a French-style Italian roll; served dipped or dry.
The Original Pancake House	Portland, Oregon	Established in 1953: "Dutch Baby" – a soufflé-style Dutch pancake. "Apple Pancake" – hand-sliced Granny Smith apples (cooked in clarified butter, cinnamon and sugar), topped with their German pancake batter (made from eggs, heavy cream, water, sugar, flour, salt and secret ingredients), slowly baked in the oven and served flipped out of the pan with apples on top.
Watson's Original Soda Fountain & Café	Orange, California	Established in 1899: "Patty Melt" – grilled Angus ground beef patty topped with "Pharmacy Sauce" (made with ketchup, mayonnaise, yellow onion, green relish, red wine vinegar, Worcestershire sauce, salt and sugar), sautéed mushrooms, caramelized onions, and four slices of Swiss cheese, served on thick-sliced butter-toasted seeded rye bread, finished off on a panini press.

=== Hey Butter Butter ===
Restaurant	Location	Specialty(s)
Saltie Girl	Boston, Massachusetts	10-Pound Butter Ball (served during bread service); "Hot Lobster Roll" – butter three ways: lobster claw and tail meat soaked in warm melted butter in a buttered toasted brioche roll, topped with beurre blanc sauce (made with white wine, butter and cream), dusted with dehydrated lobster roe and served with homemade potato chips. "Lobster Waffle" – deep-fried lobster topped with a spicy maple syrup on top a house-made buttermilk waffle (made with 4-pounds of corn butter, corn puree, salt and honey), topped with more corn butter on a base of lobster sauce.
Mochi Lab	Honolulu, Hawaii	Butter mochi (dessert made with sweet rice flour, eggs, evaporated milk, coconut milk, vanilla, shredded coconut and melted butter); "Purple Sweet Potato Butter Mochi" – pureed purple sweet potatoes, blended with butter, sugar, eggs, evaporated milk, and vanilla, surrounded by signature batter of butter mocha and baked in cupcake form. "Bacon Caramel Butter Mochi" – made with three different kinds of butter: traditional butter mocha batter; brown butter; and nature's butter—bacon fat, filled with a caramel custard, topped with caramel sauce and crispy chopped bacon.
Willa Jean	New Orleans, Louisiana	Cornbread – butter four different ways: corn flour and regular flour are mixed with buttermilk, brown sugar, leavening agents, eggs, local honey, and melted butter, poured into loaf pans and baked, melted butter is brushed on top and a pad of stick butter is placed on top, cut and served warm with a dollop of whipped butter with cane syrup on the side. "Barbecue Shrimp Toast" – a pound of local shrimp in a Cajun-style barbecue sauce made with a stick of butter, served on top of grilled sourdough bread spread with burrata (a creamy mozzarella cheese), and topped with sliced radishes, and microgreens.
Buffalo & Bergen	Union Market, Washington, D.C.	"The Slammer" – eggs scrambled in butter with American cheese, and slices of bacon served in between a homemade round knish stuffed with potato, onion, and butter, topped with a garlic knot-inspired secret sauce called "Turnpike" made with two blocks of melted butter, chopped garlic and parsley. "In Your Face" – pan-fired rounds of sliced soppressata in butter, a fried egg, fresh mozzarella, served in between a legit New York bagel, spread with pesto and a pad of butter.
Buttercream Bakeshop	Washington, D.C.	"Cinnascone" – a cinnamon roll and a scone; made with flour, baking powder, sugar, and nine-pounds of butter, spread in a sheet tray, filled with a layer of cinnamon, dark brown sugar, buttermilk and eggs, blow-torched, rolled, cut and baked, topped with a cinnamon sugar glaze.
Peaches Shrimp & Crab	Brooklyn, New York	"Blue Crab Spaghetti" – jumbo lump crab meat served over spaghetti alla chitarra topped with a butter sauce made with confit tomatoes, sliced Fresno red chili peppers, whipped garlic puree (garlic cloves cooked down in olive oil), and butter, garnished with lemon zest and Parmesan cheese, finished with toasted breadcrumbs, and chopped parsley. "The Jim Cade Boil" – named after the uncle of one of the restaurant's owners; a towering pot of snow crab legs, clams, tiger shrimp, mussels, red potatoes, corn on the cob steamed in shellfish broth made with cream, garlic puree and five-pounds of melted butter and seasoned with chili and lemon.
Callie's Hot Little Biscuit	Atlanta, Georgia	"Country Ham Biscuit" – chopped country ham served on a cheddar cheese buttermilk biscuit (made with flour, a pound of butter, cream cheese, sharp cheddar cheese from New York, and buttermilk), rolled out and stamped, topped with salted butter and baked, spread with a mustard butter made with Dijon mustard and salted butter, smothered in a melted butter bath. "Peach Shortcake Biscuit" – biscuit made with whole milk, double butter, vanilla, filled with macerated peaches, and topped with a peach puree, and sprinkled with turbinado sugar.
Neighbor Bakehouse	Dogpatch District, San Francisco, California	"Bostock" – French toast with croissant dough made with two kilos of butter, folded into a sheeter, topped with cinnamon sugar, baked and dipped with vanilla syrup and coated frangipane (almond cream and pastry cream infused with vanilla), garnished with sliver of almonds macerated vanilla syrup, and pearl sugar, baked again and topped with powdered sugar. "Ham and Cheese Morning Bun" – stroked of sesame, sunflower and poppy seeds are rolled into croissant dough, wrapped with grain mustard, smoked ham and gruyere cheese and baked.

=== Noodle Nirvana ===
Restaurant	Location	Specialty(s)
M.Y. China	San Francisco, California	Owned by Martin Yan: "Longevity Noodle Soup" – 20–30 meters long green noodles (dough made with flour, salt and spinach juice), boiled in water until al dente, served in a large bowl in a broth with shitake, snow and wood ear mushrooms, carrots, and tofu, topped with a special chili sauce, and sprinkled with fried onions and shallots. "Wild Boar Scissor-Cut Noodles" – short flour noodles (dough cut with scissors) stir-fried with strips of seasoned wild boar, bean sprouts, shredded carrots, scallions, mushrooms and fresh garlic, and tossed with sweet soy sauce.
Spaghetti Incident	New York City, New York	Home of the spaghetti on-the-go (served in a paper cone): "Bucatini Amatriciana" – al dente bucatini pasta with thick chunks of pancetta (sautéed with olive oil and garlic) and topped with tomato sauce imported from Salerno, Italy (made with san Marzano tomatoes), sprinkled with fresh grated Parmesan and chopped parsley. "Salchicha Y Broccoli Rabe" – spaghetti with sweet Italian sausage (sautéed in olive oil, garlic, red pepper flakes, broccoli rabe, and white wine), sprinkled with Parmesan and cracked black pepper.
Mopho	New Orleans, Louisiana	Cajun-meets-Asian Cuisine: "Gulf Shrimp with Tapioca Noodles and Turmeric Curry" – tapioca noodles (made with fine-ground durum flour, tapioca flour, alkaline powder, eggs and water), sautéed Gulf shrimp, (tossed in a sauce of spicy curry paste, ground turmeric, cilantro and mint). "Redeye Ramen" – thin ramen noodles infused with coffee (tossed with bacon chunks (sautéed with fresh garlic and diced shallots) and topped with redeye gravy (made from pork stock, shrimp base, ground coffee, and lemon grass), garnished with chopped mint.
Storico Fresco Alimentari E Ristorante	Atlanta, Georgia	"Chitarra Arrabbiata" – square-shaped chitarra noodles (made from a flour different kinds of flour, a dozen eggs, and olive oil), boiled in salted water and tossed in a spicy sauce (made with tomatoes and fresh soft buffalo mozzarella), sprinkled with fresh Parmesan. "Lasagna Bolognese" – green lasagna noodles (made with spinach juice), layered with béchamel, Bolognese of ground veal, beef and pork, and a sprinkle of Grana Padano cheese.
Komodo	Venice, California	"Dangerously Good Food": "Phorrito" – pho (Vietnamese comfort noodle soup) wrapped in a burrito: thinly sliced ribeye (poached in homemade pho broth), vermicelli rice noodles, sautéed jalapeños, onions, and minced garlic, chili sauce, hoisin sauce, cilantro, scallions, bean sprouts, and Thai basil leaves, wrapped in a large flour tortilla. "Ramen Burrito" – thin ramen egg noodles (tossed in shallot oil, deep-fried garlic, and onion and garlic powder), topped with deep-fried sweet Chinese sausage, fried shallots, green onions, and a fried sunny-side-up egg, wrapped in a flour tortilla.
G.C.D.C. Grilled Cheese Bar	Washington, D.C.	"Carolina Barbecue Grill Cheese" – elbow noodles (tossed in a homemade cream sauce—garlic-based, and seven types of cheeses; ranging from mild to sharp cheddar), topped with another four-cheese blend and breadcrumbs, baked in oven, layered with pulled pork topped with Carolina and Texas-style barbecue sauce, bacon crumbles and pickled jalapeños between two slices of butter-toasted sourdough bread.
Rino's Place	East Boston, Massachusetts	"Seafood Cannelloni" – two rolled-up homemade lasagna noodles stuffed with seafood stuffing (fresh lobster, scallops and shrimp, mixed with ricotta cheese), coated with a plum tomato sauce, baked in the oven, topped with a yellow bell pepper sauce (made with yellow bell pepper, onions and liquid garlic) and drizzled with a house-made basil olive oil, garnished with Pecorino Romano Parmesan cheese.
The Pig & The Lady	Chinatown, Honolulu, Hawaii	"Hawaiian Prawns and Chorizo" – Italian pappardelle pasta (wide noodles) tossed with spicy ground chorizo and four jumbo prawns (sautéed in olive oil, shallots, minced onions, garlic, clam juice, saffron broth, shrimp butter, manila clams), topped with sliced scallions. "Softshell Crab Cha Ca" – locally caught softshell crabs (soaked in a traditional Vietnamese turmeric blend), dipped in froathy egg whites, rolled in flour, and deep-fried, served with thin vermicelli rice noodles, topped with roasted peanuts, fried shallots, picked veggies, fresh herbs and finished tableside with mantong bak sauce (made with hints of pineapple, lime, ginger, and shrimp).

=== Wild & Wacky ===
Restaurant	Location	Specialty(s)
Burn Co. Barbeque	Tulsa, Oklahoma	"The Fatty" – a hot link sausage rolled in a layer of ground pork breakfast sausage and a layer of spicy ground pork sausage wrapped in a bacon lattice to make a 12-pound loaf, smoked for 2 hours, sliced thick and drizzled with barbecue sauce, served on a toasted bun.
Sabuku Sushi	San Diego, California	"I Bacon Your Pardon Roll" – spicy crab, seared scallops, deep-fried bacon, and asparagus, rolled in nori and seasoned sticky rice, topped with Chilean sea bass and torched tilapia, house-made bacon-garlic aioli (made with mayo, bacon crumbles, togarashi—a peppery spice blend, mirin—a sweet wine sauce, two kinds of hot sauces and minced garlic), and sweet mandarin sauce, garnished with candied garlic, tempura bits, scallions, sriracha and black sesame seeds.
Bone Lick BBQ	Atlanta, Georgia	"Hangover Muff" – slow-smoked pulled "porkgasmic" pork butt, cured and 12-hour house-smoked bacon, ham, a sausage patty, two slices of white American cheese and a fried egg on buttered-toasted English muffins.
Lunchbox Laboratory	Seattle, Washington	"The Dork Burger" – pork + duck = dork: a gourmet burger patty mixed with sesame-ginger glazed roasted duck and pork butt seasoned with salt & pepper topped with jack cheese, caramelized onions and garlic mayo spread on a toasted brioche bun.
The Bazaar	Beverly Hills, California	Owned by Chef José Andrés: "Reconstructive Olives" – the juice of two different kinds of olives are blended in calcium chloride, then dropped into a solution of sodium alginate, turns into an orb and marinated in olive oil and herbs. "The Floating Island" – a big ball of liquid nitrogen-frozen coconut mouse, served with foie gras cotton candy lollipops.
Pizza Brain	Philadelphia, Pennsylvania	"Backyard Barbecue Pizza" – large thin-crust pizza dough topped with baked beans, shredded cheddar cheese, hot dog chunks, baked in the oven, layered with purple cabbage coleslaw, garnished with potato chips, and drizzled with yellow mustard.
Strip House	Planet Hollywood, Las Vegas, Nevada	"Tomahawk Ribeye with Bleu Cheese Crust" – 50-ounce 40-day aged tomahawk-cut long bone-in Imperial Wagyu ribeye, topped with olive oil, salt, and cracked black pepper, broiled, and coated with a coat of cold-smoked bleu cheese, sliced tableside.
Party Fowl	Nashville, Tennessee	"Beer Butt Chicken" – a whole chicken (brined for 24 hours in sweet tea, lemon juice, teriyaki sauce, fresh garlic, thyme and secret spices), perched on a can of beer, smoked and showered with more beer. "Brunch for Two" – a Bloody Mary cocktail garnished with two deep-fried whole Cornish game hens (coated with special "poultrygeist" sauce), Scotch Eggs, avocados with an olive in the core; all speared on sticks.
Sarge's Deli	New York City, New York	"The Monster" – thin slices of house-cured corned beef, homemade pastrami and roast beef, fresh roast turkey breast, and mild Jewish beef salami, topped with lettuce, tomatoes, Russian dressing and house-made coleslaw on a loaf of black-seed rye bread.
Torchy's Tacos	Austin, Texas	"Ace of Spades" – butter-seared jalapeño sausage, smoked beef brisket, a fried egg, topped with creamy queso, sour cream and "Diablo Sauce" (made with vegetable oil, diced onions, garlic, habanero peppers, tomato sauce, vinegar, and salt, and garnished with cilantro), wrapped in a flour tortilla.
The Twisted Spoke	Chicago, Illinois	"Flaming Wings" – deep-fried chicken wings in a lemon sauce (made with butter, oregano, chili flakes, garlic, pepper, lemon zest, and lemon juice), then bourbon is poured over and its set on fire, served in a cast-iron pan. "Breakfast of Champions" – a cocktail with heavy cream, bourbon, Irish cream, topped with Captain Crunch cereal and whipped cream.
The Ice Cream Store	Rehoboth Beach, Delaware	"Scorpion Sting" – ice cream made by Woodside Farm Creamery: African vanilla ice cream, strawberries, several hot sauces, cayenne pepper powder, served in a cone, and garnished with an eatable scorpion on top.
Unicorn	Seattle, Washington	"The Unicorn Dog" – a butter-battered corn dog (made with brown sugar, and corn niblets), split down the middle and filled with house-made sriracha cream cheese and caramelized onions (sautéed with half-pound of butter, salt, pepper and a whole pitcher of beer), garnished with scallions.
House of Nanking	Chinatown, San Francisco, California	"Noodle Tower" – three-stories of crispy fried noodles, layered with beef, chicken, shrimp, onions, peppers, stir-fried in a spicy chili sauce, garnished with fresh tomatoes.
Vandalay Industries @ State Fair of Texas	Fair Park, Dallas, Texas	"Chicken-Fried Lobster Tail" – whole 7-ounce lobster tail (brined for five hours in a mixture of salt, sugar, lemon juice and secret spices), double-dredged in egg and flour mix, deep-fried and topped with champagne gravy (made with Champagne, garlic, lemon juice, chicken stock, flour, milk, butter and Cajun spices), served with fries and "Texas caviar" or corn relish (corn, kidney beans, and pico de gallo).
The Vortex Bar & Grill	Little Five Points, Atlanta, Georgia	"Quadrupole Coronary Bypass" – 32-ounces of pure sirloin (four ¼-pound patties on flattop and two ½-pounders on the grill), 27 slices of bacon, 28 slices of American cheese, four fried eggs, grilled onions, and eight slices of Texas toast—all stacked together with mayo and 12-inch skewers, served with 20 ounces of tatter tots and fries, and 16 ounces of 'cheese-cheesy goo', garnished with bacon crumbles, served in a large bowl.

=== Food on Fire ===
Restaurant	Location	Specialty(s)
King + Duke	Atlanta, Georgia	"Every Season of Every Year: "King Ribeye" – 2.2-pounds of ribeye seasoned with salt, pepper and garlic oil (from roasted whole garlic cloves), cooked over massive campfire grill with a mixture of hickory, white oak and fruit wood, finished in the smoke box, sliced, and served with smoked bone marrow, grilled sourdough, and grilled whole roasted garlic with a side of bordelaise (deep red wine flavor sauce).
Jitlada Southern Thai Cuisine	Sunset Boulevard, Los Angeles, California	"Jungle Curry" –jumbo Thai tiger prawns on the half-shell, (stir-fired with eggplant, green beans, lime leaves, red peppers, jalapeños and green peppercorns in a Thai chili paste (made with stone ground spices: garlic, onions, secret spices, and Thai bird's eye chilies), served in a large bowl. "Thai Beef Salad" – sliced tri-tip beef (marinated in soy sauce and stir-fried), tossed with cucumbers, red onions, tomatoes, and homemade Nam Prik Pao (Thai red chili paste made with fried garlic, fried onions and fried bird's eye chilies).
Antico Napoletana Pizza	Atlanta, Georgia	"The Diavola" – three-day rested homemade dough, topped with grated fresh mozzarella, tomato sauce (made with imported San Marzano D.O.P. tomatoes), sliced Italian piccante salami, Calabrian peperonicino (Italian roasted red peppers), chili oil, and sliced buffalo mozzarella, baked in a high-heat wood-burning oven.
Hometown Bar-B-Que	Red Hook, Brooklyn, New York	"5 Day Fire Grilled Oaxacan Chicken" – chicken pieces (in a 36-hour brine, then marinated for 3 days in a Oaxacan spice blend—chipotle, garlic, salt, sugar, red onions, cilantro, lemon and lime juices), cooked with white oak on an all-wood fired Argentinian asado grill, finished in the oven for 20 minutes and char-grilled again, topped with salsa verde and pickled onions.
Boston Burger Company	Boston, Massachusetts	"Pigferno Burger" – an Angus beef patty grilled on flattop, topped with white cheddar cheese, braised spicy pulled pork butt, piled high with five sriracha beer-battered onion rings drizzled with homemade habanero barbecue sauce (made with blended jalapeños, habaneros, ketchup, yellow mustard, secret spices, molasses, brown sugar, apple cider vinegar, and Worcestershire sauce), and habanero salsa (made with onions, tomatoes, habaneros, jalapeños, lime juice, salt, pepper and cilantro) served on a butter-toasted bun, loaded with sriracha mayo. "Boneless Pterodactyl Wings" – deep-fried chicken tenders coated with teriyaki sauce, habanero salsa, jalapeño and chunks of pineapple, served with a side of sriracha blue cheese.
Wayne Jacob's Smokehouse Restaurant	LaPlace, Louisiana	"Smoked Andouille" – andouille sausage for 24 hours smoked in their backyard smokehouse with a 75-year-old recipe, smoked with local oak wood. "Red Beans and Rice" – (made with a roux of flour and oil, scallions, white onions, andouille, tasso (smoked spicy pork), red beans, water, chicken base, minced garlic, and Worcestershire sauce), served with a scoop of rice on top, a whole char-grilled smoked andouille and a piece of French bread.
Mike's Huli Chicken	Kaneohe, Oahu, Hawaii	Food truck with a garden setting: "Huli Chicken" – whole chicken (brined for 24-hours in Hawaiian salt and secret spices), cooked on a rotisserie rack with local Kiawe wood, served plate lunch style with white rice, mashed potatoes, macaroni salad and pineapple.
RoliRoti Rotisserie & Catering	San Francisco, California	Food truck located in the Bay Area at farmers' markets: "Porchetta Sandwich" – porchetta (Berkshire pork rubbed with lemon zest, garlic, fennel seeds, salt, marjoram, rosemary, lemon juice and pinot grigio), rolled up and cooked on the rotisserie for 4-hours with crispy skin, sliced, topped with crispy skin pieces, onion marmalade, aurgula, and sea salt, served on a toasted ciabatta bread.

=== Brain Freeze ===
Restaurant	Location	Specialty(s)
CottonHi	Los Angeles, California	100% Organic Cotton Candy & Fresh Soft Serve (milk, chocolate and mint): "Rock’n Pop Sundae" – salted caramel soft serve ice cream topped with chocolate sauce, caramel sauce, caramel popcorn, cereal marshmallows, and cotton candy. "Berry Shortcake Sundae" – milk soft serve topped with real berry sauce (made with fresh raspberries, blackberries and blueberries), crushed graham cracker crumbs, berries, powdered sugar and a giant mound of strawberry flavored cotton candy. "Tiramisu Sundae" – chocolate soft served topped with coffee-mascarpone sauce, chocolate shavings, cocoa powder, a lady finger cookie and coffee cotton candy, served with an injection of more coffee.
Volcano Shakes	Honolulu, Oahu, Hawaii	"Haleakala" – Named after Maui's largest volcano known for red sunsets: a red velvet milkshake (made with red velvet cake ice cream and whole milk), topped with real whipped cream, one large red velvet cupcake, one small red velvet cupcake and a slice of red velvet Swiss roll, served in a chocolate syrup coated, vanilla frosting rimmed glass with red velvet cake cookie crumbs. "St. Helen's Cookie Blast" – Named after Washington's mountain: a yin yang of chocolate and vanilla milkshake, topped with whipped cream, chocolate sauce, three chocolate chip cookies, cookie crumbles, and an entire chocolate chip ice cream sandwich, served in a chocolate frosting rimmed glass with crumbled chocolate chip cookies.
La New Yorkina	West Village, New York City, New York	"Canela-Cajeta Paleta" – paleta is a Mexican-style ice pop: cinnamon ice cream (made with milk, cream, sugar, and canela—Mexican cinnamon), poured into a square ice pop mold, frozen in a liquid bath, stuffed with a cajeta center (Mexican goat's milk caramel made with goat's milk, cinnamon and vanilla beans). "Napoleon Paleta" – a secret ice cream base of chocolate (from Oaxaca), layered with a strawberry base (strawberries mixed with vanilla beans from local farmer's market) and a vanilla base (vanilla beans from Veracuz).
Kremo Ice Cream	Atlanta, Georgia	Thailand rolled ice cream: "Strawberry Cheesecake" –strawberries, graham crackers smashed on an ice pan machine, flavored with a lemon juice base (made from lemon zest and cream cheese) rolled into ice cream, topped with chopped mangoes, strawberries, chocolate sauce and rainbow sprinkles, served in a homemade waffle bowl. "The Kremo Bun" – Belgium dark chocolate rolled inside a panini-pressed soft glazed doughnut, and topped with cookies and cream crumbles, coconuts flakes and caramel sauce.
The Creole Creamery	New Orleans, Louisiana	"Tchoupitoulas Sundae" – Named after a local long street: eight scoops of New Orleans-inspired ice cream flavors; 'The Green Fairy' (made with absinthe, sharp dark chocolate and candied orange peel), 'Mango Unchained' (made with mangos, sweet-spicy whiskey and cayenne pepper and local honey), 'Creole Cream Cheese' (a local favorite), 'Magnolia Flower', 'Black & Gold Crunch' (named after the New Orleans Saints), 'French Vanilla' (with ground chicory root, chocolate sandwich cookies, and chocolate chips), 'Lavender Honey', 'Café Au Lait' (flavored with coffee and ground chicory), and 'Pink Nectar Sherbet' (made with almonds and vanilla beans); topped with chocolate sauce, butterscotch sauce, crushed chocolate chip cookies, gummy bears, whipped cream, rainbow sprinkles, wafers, and cherries, served in a massive glass bowl. "Tchoupitoulas Challenge" – finish a whole bowl by yourself and earn your name on a plaque on the wall of fame.
F.K.: Frozen Kuhsterd	San Francisco, California	Frozen custard bars (food truck): "S'more Bar" – a vanilla frozen custard bar, dipped in milk chocolate, fused with a graham cracker shell, slathered in homemade marshmallow cream, and torched. "Strawberry Shortcake Bar" – a cookie butter frozen custard bar, dipped in white chocolate, pressed into shortbread crumble, and finished off with freeze-dried strawberry powder. "Marley Treat" – a chocolate frozen custard bar, dipped in white chocolate, smothered in red velvet cake crumbs, covered in a rainbow of tiny macarons and finished with a white chocolate drizzle.
SnoCream Company	Annandale, Virginia	Inside a food bus called the 'Sno Bus', serving Taiwanese snow cream (a hybrid of ice cream and shaved ice: "Strawberry Snow" – strawberry snocream (made with fresh strawberries pureed with sugar, salt, vanilla extract, milk and heavy cream), frozen into a cylinder of ice ready for the shaving machine, shaved into a large cup and topped with corn flakes, a drizzle of condensed milk and rainbow sprinkles.
Emack and Bolio's	Boston, Massachusetts	Owned by rock n' roll lawyer Bob Rook: "Twisted Dee-Light" – invented by Dee Snider of Twisted Sister: chocolate ice cream with fudge chunks and chocolate chips. "Deep Purple Chip" – named after Glenn Hughes from Deep Purple: black raspberry ice cream with white and dark chocolate chips. "World Famous Original Flavored Cones" – created by E&B in 1980: waffle cones lined with different cereals (like Fruity Pebbles or puffed rice cereal treats), chocolates, candies, and ringed in melted marshmallow and. "Get Toasted Marsh-Mellow Cone" – a homemade cone topped with giant scoop of Cosmic Crunch (vanilla ice cream with chocolate chips, nuts, toffee and cookie pieces) and torched marshmallow fluff. "Midnight Munchies Sundae" – scoops of Serious Chocolate Addiction topped with hot fudge sauce, chocolate whipped cream, a drizzle of hot fudge, chocolate hearts and a chocolate peace sign, served in a plastic cup. "Ice Cream Pizza" – a sundae in a slice: a brownie crust topped with vanilla ice cream, a drizzle of hot fudge and marshmallow, milk, dark and white chocolate hearts, stars & moon rainbow sprinkles and a chocolate peace sign.

=== Egg-Streme Eats ===
Restaurant	Location	Specialty(s)
Koko Head Café	Honolulu, Oahu, Hawaii	All-day brunch: "Ohayou Egg Skillet" – two sunny-side-up eggs, caramelized onions, marinated mushrooms, and heritage Duroc pork, topped with ohayou sauce (made with a roux of butter, flour, and milk; Parmesan cheese, and hondashi—powdered Japanese fish stock), covered with grated Parmesan, baked in the oven, and garnished with aonori—dried green seaweed, bubu arare—micro rice crackers and katsuobushi—dried bonito (tuna loin) flakes, served in a hot cast-iron skillet. "Volcano Eggs" – two eggs in a skillet filled with fresh okra, green beans, tomatoes, and spicy Portuguese sausage, topped with a sauce (made from onions, garlic, ginger, red jalapeños, crushed red pepper chili flakes, tomato sauce, and honey), covered with Vermont white cheddar cheese, drizzled with chili oil, scallions, and crispy rice pellets.
Knead & Co. Pasta Bar + Market	Grand Central Market, Los Angeles, California	They offer an egg on every pasta dish: "Egg Raviolo" – an oversized egg ravioli (made with egg dough—about 5-pounds of egg yolks, kneaded, sheeted and cut), filled with a mixture of Parmesan, ricotta, Parmigano-Rigiano cheeses, and roasted kale, placed onto the pasta sheet and topped with an egg yolk, sealed and sliced apart, boiled and topped with a peperonata sauce (made with stewed peppers, tomatoes, onions, herbs, basil and butter), and garnished with grated Parmesan, oil and mint. "Bucatini Cacao e Pepe" – bucatini pasta topped with a sauce (made with vegetable stock, butter, pecorino cheese, and cracked black pepper), topped with a whole fried egg.
Ledlow	Los Angeles, California	Eggs from free-range organic chickens on a local farm: "Scotch Egg Burger" – a soft-boiled 9-minute egg, wrapped in a house-made spicy sausage patty, dredged in flour, eggs and panko breadcrumbs, deep-fried, topped with a slice of melted cheddar cheese, lettuce, onions, and dill served on a roll with garlic aioli and peppercorn mustard, served with hand-cut fries.
Carrollton Market	New Orleans, Louisiana	Bayou Brunch: "Biscuits and Debris" – two rounds of butter-toasted 'Yankee cornbread' (cornbread with sugar in it), topped with two poached eggs, boneless shredded beef short ribs (in its own beef jus), and finished off with homemade Hollandaise (beaten egg yolks, white wine reduction, and butter, spiced with hot sauce and cayenne). "Bruch Poutine" – thin-cut French fries layered with melted cheddar cheese curds, and topped with chorizo gravy and two fried eggs, garnished with green onions.
Egg Shop	Nolita, New York City, New York	"Hot Chicks" – fiery fried chicken (chicken in a 24-hour brine of sugar, salt and chili flakes, then a buttermilk and cayenne mixture, double dredged in flour and spicy buttermilk), deep-fried and topped with an over-easy egg, cilantro, and spicy carrot-jalapeño slaw (made with carrots, green jalapeños, cucumber sugar, sesame seeds and champagne vinegar) and a runny yellow yolks, served on a toasted roll slathered with spicy mayo. "Bacon Egg & Cheese Sandwich" – Black Forest bacon, a farm-fresh broken yolk sunny-side-up egg, topped with tomato jam (made with slow-cooked tomatoes, jalapeños, and maple syrup), pickled jalapeños, melted shredded Vermont white cheddar, served on a toasted bun.
Pizzeria Orso	Falls Church, Virginia	Neapolitan pizza with a French twist: "Uovo Fritto Pizza" – (Fried Eggs Pizza) sourdough pizza dough topped with Italian pecorino cheese, buffalo mozzarella, sliced fingerling potatoes, cured bacon, and an entire egg, cooked in a wood-fire burning oven imported from Naples, Italy made with volcanic rock, and finished off with two fried runny eggs. "Orso Calzone" – pizza dough stuffed with ricotta, pecorino, and mozzarella cheese, spicy salami, folded, sealed and poked with a hole to let topping seep in: San Marzano tomato sauce, and an egg yolk in the hole, baked in the oven and served hot.
Pacific Puffs	San Francisco, California	Handcrafted cream puffs: "Peanut Butter Stuffed Puff" – pate a choux dough—a French pastry dough used to make eclairs (made with water, flour, salt, butter, and 64 eggs in one batch of 300 for just the dough), baked in the oven and stuffed with pastry cream (flour, milk, sugar, butter, eight eggs, vanilla, smooth peanut butter and whipped cream), and dipped in a warm chocolate glaze, sprinkled with crushed peanuts.
Cutty's	Brookline, Massachusetts	Burch on a bun: "Benedict'wich" – a Best of Boston scrambled egg patty (made with blended eggs, salt, cold butter, cooked in a special griddle with heat and steam), topped hot slices of cured ham, and served on a toasted English muffin spread with firm Hollansaise (made with brown butter, white vinegar, chili sauce and eggs). "Chorizo-Egg Sandwich" – egg patty topped with house-made spicy chorizo fresh mozzarella, and cilantro on a toasted black pepper brioche bun with mayo.

=== Destination Dining ===
Restaurant	Location	Specialty(s)
DiMillos on the Water Restaurant	Portland, Maine	"Surf & Turf" – whole streamed Maine lobster loaded with homemade stuffing (made with panko crumbs, sherry and green peppers), and a bacon-wrapped filet mignon drizzled with demi-glace.
South Beach Bar & Grille	Ocean Beach, San Diego, California	"Baja Fish Taco" – tempura-battered deep-fried Alaskan pollock topped with melted cheddar cheese, shredded purple baggage and salsa fresca, drizzled with buttermilk ranch white sauce on a flour tortilla.
Duke's Barefoot Bar and Restaurant	Honolulu, Hawaii	"Kimo's Original Hula Pie" – vanilla-macadamia ice cream with cold fudge layered on a chocolate cookie crust, topped with real whipped cream, hot fudge and chopped macadamia nuts.
Salvation Taco	Midtown, New York City, New York	"Pibil Carnitas Taco" – shredded pork shoulder (marinated in pibil sauce made with lime juice, orange juice, annatto, cloves, oregano, and black pepper), covered in pork fat and slow-cooked in oven, topped with spicy avocado salsa (made with blended cilantro, avocado, tomatillos, serrano peppers, onion, garlic and salt) on a flour tortilla.
The Fort	Morrison, Colorado	"Buffalo Ribeye Steak" – a 12-ounce buffalo ribeye steak (rubbed with granulated garlic, salt, pepper and sugar), char-grilled on an open-flame, and served with homemade pork-potatoes and green beans.
The Flying Harpoon	Gulf Shores, Alabama	"Crawfish Cornbread" – cornbread mix (made from three-pounds of Louisiana crawfish, yellow corn flour, salt, baking soda, a dozen eggs, sweet cream corn, onion, jalapeños, red & green peppers, cheddar and Monterey jack cheeses, garlic, and cayenne), topped with a poached egg.
El Pub Restaurant	Little Havana, Miami Beach, Florida	"Cuban Sandwich" – sliced pork shoulder (roasted in mojo sauce made with sour orange juice and garlic), ham, Swiss cheese, pickles and mustard on buttered and pressed Cuban bread, topped with potato sticks.
Joe’s Kansas City Bar-B-Que	Kansas City, Kansas	"St. Louis–Style Pork Ribs" – whole rack of spare ribs, rubbed with secret spices, slow-smoked with Missouri white oak, and served with toast, pickled and a side of homemade barbecue sauce.
Idle Hour	Los Angeles, California	Barrel-shaped restaurant: "Sloppy Joe" – ground beef and ground pork (browned with San Marzano tomatoes, onions, jalapeño peppers, bourbon, chili pepper, cumin, and ketchup) topped with aged white cheddar on a toasted brioche bun.
Cabana Grill at MGM Grand	Las Vegas, Nevada	"Lobster Nachos" – tortilla chips topped grilled lobster tail meat, cheese sauce (shredded and cubed cheddar, pepper jack cheese, salt, pepper, jalapeño, chipotle and adobe), fresh guacamole (made with avocado, tomatoes, onions, cilantro, and lemon juice), roasted peppers and sour cream.
Talula's Table	Kennett Square, Pennsylvania	"Smoked Pea and Prosciutto Ravioli", "Alaskan Salmon and Foie Gras" – wild Alaskan salmon served with buttered-seared foie gras, cooked sous vide in its own juices, served in a local mushroom sauce. "Red Nation Lake Walleye" – seared and served with polenta and pumpkin seed green salsa.
Ms. P's Electric Cock	Austin, Texas	"Ms. P's Fried Chicken" – 3-piece chicken (breast, thigh and leg) wet dredged in spicy buttermilk, dried dredged in seasoned flour, deep-fried in peanut oil, served with a sweet roll and garnished with pickled jalapeños.

=== Chow Down Meat Town ===
Restaurant	Location	Specialty(s)
Boneheads Wing Bar	Warwick, Rhode Island	"Wrong Side of the Road" – Winner at the National Chicken Wing Festival: chicken wings deep-fried in canola oil, covered in a honey-sriracha sauce (made with sriracha hot sauce, brown sugar and honey). "Cinnamon Chicken Wings" – coated in cinnamon-sugar and drizzled with vanilla frosting.
Lewis Barbecue	Charleston, South Carolina	"El Sancho Loco" – shredded pork shoulder and whole packer-cut sliced beef brisket, seasoned with yellow mustard, pickle juice, coarse black pepper and kosher salt, slow-smoked for 18-hours with local white oak, layered with smoked hot link sausage (made with beef heart, kidney and brisket stuffed inside a hog gut casing), topped with barbecue sauce (vinegar, ketchup and mustard), pickled red onion, and hatch green chili barbecue sauce, served on a toasted bun.
Poulet Galore Rotisserie	South Lake Union, Seattle, Washington	"Fried Chicken Sandwich" – whole chicken (brine and air-dried for 24-hours), cooked on a rotisserie for 45 minutes, bone-out chicken thigh, rolled into a patty, soaked in buttermilk (with dill, chive, paprika and garlic), breaded in cornmeal and flour (spiced with onion powder and paprika), deep-fried and topped with purple cabbage parsley slaw, homemade relish, chicken skins, and lemon-pepper aioli on a toasted ciabatta bread.
Rehab Burger Therapy	Scottsdale, Arizona	"The Porkster" – a 10-ounce 'rehab' sirloin and brisket patty, char-grilled, topped with habanero-pineapple barbecue-sauced pulled pork (marinated in apple-cider vinegar, salt and pepper), and two slices of cheddar cheese, on a butter-toasted brioche bun. "Philly Cheeseburger" – beef patty topped 6-ounces of shave ribeye meat, two slices of provolone cheese, grilled peppers & onions, and cheese sauce on a butter-toasted pretzel roll.
The Golden Fleece Restaurant	Greektown, Detroit, Michigan	"Gyro" – homemade ground lamb meat cooked on a round stick rotisserie, sliced and served in a warm pita bread with shredded lettuce, onions, tomatoes and tzatziki sauce.
Roaming Buffalo Bar-B-Que	Denver, Colorado	"Bison Ribs" – whole rack of bison ribs (rubbed with yellow mustard, chili powder, paprika, cumin, garlic powder, onion powder, salt and pepper), smoked with pecan and white oak pellets for five-hours, served with baked beans and cornbread.
Southern Hot Chicken & Sandwiches	St. Louis, Missouri	"Hot Fried Chicken" – chicken pieces marinated, rubbed in garlic, cayenne, habanero, salt and sugar, and dredged in seasoned chicken flour (self-rising cake flour with secret seasonings), deep-fried and soaked in habanero chili oil and 'magic spice' rub, served on top of toast with pickles. "Chicken-Fried Steak" – 6-ounce tenderized round steak, dredged in chicken flour, beaten eggs and buttermilk, pan-fried in butter on the flattop, and smothered chicken gravy, garnished with chives.
Heavy Seas Alehouse	Baltimore, Maryland	"The Big Clipper" – half-pound of grilled sliced steak, topped with jalapeño bacon, house-smoked cheese, caramelized onions (reduced with balsamic vinegar and house-brewed beer), lettuce, tomatoes, and a full order of fries, sriracha mayonnaise served in between a whole loaf of crusty bread. "Turkey Leg" – massive turkey leg rubbed with jerk seasoning, smoked, baked and deep-fried, topped with a salty-sweet teriyaki sauce, garnished with an orange slice and scallions on a bed of arugula.

=== Worth The Wait ===
Restaurant	Location	Specialty(s)
Mrs. White's Golden Rule Café	Phoenix, Arizona	Famous Fried Chicken & Pork Chops: "Chicken-Fried Steak" – tenderized cube steak, dipped in egg wash, (seasoned with salt, pepper and garlic, and secret spices), floured, deep-fried and smothered with secret-recipe chicken gravy, served with homemade mac & cheese (made with elbow macaroni, pepper, garlic and milk, shredded jack and cheddar), and green beans. "Fried Pork Chops" – thin-cut pork chops, dredged in seasoned flour and deep-fried.
PV Donuts	Providence, Rhode Island	Brioche Doughnuts: "Coffee Milk Doughnut" – brioche dough (made from four, eggs, butter), rolled and shaped into doughnuts, deep-fried, dipped into a coffee-milk glaze (made with coffee syrup) and crushed espresso beans. "Cereal Milk Doughnut" – brioche doughnut dipped in a glaze of sugar and milk (steeped in ‘'Fruity Pebbles'’ cereal overnight) and covered in fresh fruity cereal pieces.
Union Woodshop	Clarkston, Michigan	"Woodshop Pizza" – hand-stretched fermented pizza dough, topped with Memphis-style barbecue sauce, shredded muenster, mozzarella, and pecorino Romano cheeses, chopped beef brisket (rubbed with salt, pepper, paprika, garlic, and secret spices, smoked for 15 hours), pulled pork butt, and smoked chicken (rubbed with brown sugar), and diced red onions, cooked in a wood-fire pizza oven.
Denver Biscuit Company	City Park, Denver, Colorado	"DBC Club" – freshly made hot biscuits (made with flour, water and frozen butter), layered with a deep-fried chicken breast (dredged in dried tomato, dried mushroom, and cayenne pepper, dipped in buttermilk and hot sauce), two slices of melted cheddar cheese, thick-cut bacon, lettuce, tomatoes and a spicy chipotle ranch sauce. "The Dahlia" – biscuit French toast (day-old biscuits, split-open, dipped in batter of egg yolks, milk cinnamon and nutmeg), grilled on flattop and layered with a sausage patty, a fried egg and homemade apple butter, covered in maple syrup.
Blue Moon Café	Federal Hill, Baltimore, Maryland	"Cereal Encrusted French Toast" – three thick-cut slices of egg bread (dredged in egg batter and crushed corn flakes), grilled on the flattop, stacked and topped with sliced bananas, whipped cream, strawberries, blackberries, blueberries and apple slices, dusted with powdered sugar and cinnamon. "Frito Pie French Toast" – three slices of corn chip-encrusted French toast topped with salsa verde, shredded cheese, crumbled chorizo, shredded lettuce, black beans, sour cream, salsa roja, and extra corn chips.
Bogarts Smoke-House	Soulard, St. Louis, Missouri	"Apricot Glazed Pork Ribs" – long-back ribs (rubbed with 'gold dust': lemon-pepper, coriander, cumin, garlic, paprika, and cayenne, then brown sugar), smoked for 2 1/2 hours, wet rubbed with brown sugar-water mixture, glazed with apricot preserve-simple syrup mix, torched to caramelize glaze, sliced and served. "Smoked Pastrami Sandwich" – smoked pastrami, sliced and served on pumpernickel rye bread.
Ma'ono Fried Chicken and Whiskey	Seattle, Washington	Hawaiian-inspired cooking: "Grandma’s Fried Chicken" – (order a couple days ahead of time) chicken pieces (brined, drained and soaked in buttermilk overnight, dipped in egg wash, dredged in soy sauce powder, toasted kombu seaweed powder, and shiitake powder), doubled deep-fried and seasoned with ma’ono umami seasoning (made with toasted seaweed, toasted shiitake mushroom, and onido, tomato powder), served with white rice, house-made one-week kimchi and chili sauce for dipping.
Hominy Grill	Charleston, South Carolina	"The Nasty Biscuit" – homemade biscuit sandwich (made with flour, milk and three different kinds of fat: vegetable shortening, butter and lard), cut into rounds and baked in oven, topped with Southern-fried chicken breast, grated Vermont sharp cheddar cheese, and house-made sausage gravy.

=== Bigger Is Better ===
Restaurant	Location	Specialty(s)
The Hungry Monkey	Newport, Rhode Island	Monkey Bread Stuffed French Toast, King Kong 15 Egg Omelet
Mama's on the Hill	St. Louis, Missouri	Mega Meatball Plate
Mudgie's Deli	Detroit, Michigan	"Gutty" – a 6 Pound Deli Sandwich, Forget About It
Charleston Burger Company	Charleston, South Carolina	Killer Beehive Burger, The Big Hurt
Brat Haus	Scottsdale, Arizona	German Style Pretzels, Beer Cheese Fondue, Das Brats
Virgilio's Pizzeria and Wine Bar	Littleton, Colorado	"Hugilio" – a 28-inch pizza, Molto Carne Calzone
Dong Thap Noodles	Seattle, Washington	Pha
Blue Agave	Baltimore, Maryland	El Toro Grande Burrito, Bloody Mary
