= Chris Schlesinger =

Boston-based chef and restaurateur

Chris Schlesinger is a Boston-based chef and restaurateur.

== Background ==
Born in Virginia, Schlesinger graduated from The Culinary Institute of America in 1977. The nephew of historian Arthur M. Schlesinger, Jr., he started at Northeastern University but dropped out. Early jobs after graduating from CIA include being the chef at the Sakonnet Golf Club in Rhode Island.

== Restaurants ==
- East Coast Grill: Schlesinger opened the restaurant in 1986 in Inman Square, Cambridge. In mid-2012, he sold the business to executive chef Jason Heard, general manager Robin Greenspan, and former line cook James Lozano. The restaurant closed on January 23, 2016.
- Jake and Earl's Dixie BBQ: Opened 1989 in Cambridge and Waltham, since closed.
- The Blue Room: Opened 1990 in Kendall Square, with Stan Frankenthaler.
- Back Eddy: Opened 1999 in Westport, MA, overlooking the Westport River.
- The Automatic: Together with Dave Cagle, The Automatic opened in Kendall Square in May 2016. The restaurant then closed in 2020.

== Awards and honors ==
In 1996, Schlesinger won the James Beard Foundation Award for Best Chef of the Northeast. He has appeared on the WGBH-TV show A Moveable Feast With Fine Cooking. He was featured on the PBS show (episode 102) of How to Cook Everything: Bittman Takes On America's Chefs.

== Bibliography ==
Along with John "Doc" Willoughby, he has written five cookbooks: the James Beard Cookbook Award winner, The Thrill of the Grill (Morrow, 1990); Salsas, Sambals, Chutneys, and Chowchows (Morrow, 1993); Big Flavors of the Hot Sun (Morrow, 1994); Lettuce in Your Kitchen (Morrow, 1996); and License to Grill (Morrow, 1997). They also have a monthly feature in The New York Times, and have written numerous articles for magazines such as GQ and Food & Wine. Chris is also a Contributing Editor for Saveur magazine.
