= Cassie Piuma =

Chef and restaurateur

Cassie Piuma is an American chef and restaurateur, at Sarma, a restaurant in Somerville, Massachusetts that she owns with Ana Sortun. Her husband, Matthew Piuma, whom she met in college, is also a co-owner.

== Biography ==
Growing up in Duxbury, Massachusetts, Piuma intended on a career in medicine. Instead of attending the University of Vermont, she went to Johnson & Wales University, graduating with a degree in culinary arts. While at school, she cooked at Providence restaurant Al Forno. She later moved to Boston and worked for Barbara Lynch at The Butcher Shop and Frank McClelland’s Sel de La Terre.

Piuma also worked for Sortun at Oleana in Cambridge, Massachusetts, eventually becoming Chef de Cuisine. In 2013, they opened Sarma.

== Awards and honors ==
Piuma has been nominated multiple times for the James Beard Foundation Award Best chef in the Northeast category (2015, 2016, 2017, 2019, 2020 and 2022). Boston (magazine), in 2020, named her Best Chef, General Excellence, in Boston, In 2014, she was named Best Chef in the Up and Coming category.
