= Top Chef Masters season 2 =

Top Chef Masters
- Season 2
- No. of tasks: 19
- No. of contestants: 22
- Winner: Marcus Samuelsson
- No. of episodes: 10

Release
- Original network: Bravo
- Original release: April 7 – June 9, 2010

Additional information
- Filming dates: November 2009 – December 2009

Season chronology
- ← Previous; Season 1 Next → Season 3

The second season of the American reality competition show Top Chef Masters was announced on October 22, 2009. In addition, it was announced that Gail Simmons would be added as a critic. The season premiered on April 7, 2010 with 22 chefs competing against each other in weekly challenges. In the season finale that premiered on June 9, 2010, Marcus Samuelsson was crowned Top Chef Master.

== Critics ==
- Kelly Choi (Host)
- Gael Greene (Critic)
- James Oseland (Critic)
- Jay Rayner (Critic)
- Gail Simmons (Critic)

== Master Contestants ==
22 chefs competed in Top Chef Masters. In elimination order the contestants were:

=== Preliminary rounds ===
==== Episode 1 ====
- Govind Armstrong — 8 oz Burger Bar (Los Angeles, Calif.)
- Jimmy Bradley — The Red Cat (New York, N.Y.)
- Jerry Traunfeld — Poppy (Seattle, Wash.)
- Ana Sortun — Oleana (Cambridge, Mass.)
- Tony Mantuano – Spiaggia (Chicago, Ill.)
- Susan Feniger – Street (Los Angeles, Calif.)

==== Episode 2 ====
- David Burke — David Burke Townhouse (New York, N.Y.)
- Thierry Rautureau — Rover's (Seattle, Wash.)
- Monica Pope — t'afia (Houston, Texas)
- Marcus Samuelsson—Red Rooster (New York, N.Y.)
- Carmen Gonzalez – Chef Consultant (New York, N.Y.)

==== Episode 3 ====
- Mark Peel — The Tar Pit (Los Angeles, Calif.)
- Ludo Lefebvre — Ludo Bites (Los Angeles, Calif.)
- Graham Elliot — Graham Elliot Restaurant (Chicago, Ill.)
- Wylie Dufresne — wd~50 (New York, N.Y.)
- Jonathan Waxman – Barbuto (New York, N.Y.)

==== Episode 4 ====
- Debbie Gold — The American Restaurant (Kansas City, Mo.)
- Rick Tramonto — TRU (Chicago, Ill.)
- Maria Hines — Tilth & Golden Beetle (Seattle, Wash.)
- Susur Lee — Lee, Lee Kitchen, Kid Lee, Luckee (Toronto Canada)
- Jody Adams — Porto (Boston, MA)

=== Champions' round ===
- Carmen González — Chef Consultant (New York, N.Y.)
- Jody Adams — Rialto Restaurant (Cambridge, Mass.)
- Tony Mantuano — Spiaggia (Chicago, Ill.)
- Susan Feniger — Street (Los Angeles, Calif.)
- Jonathan Waxman — Barbuto (New York, N.Y.)
- Rick Moonen — RM Seafood (Las Vegas, Nev.)
- Susur Lee — Madeline's (Toronto, Canada)

=== Top Chef Master ===
- Marcus Samuelsson — Aquavit (New York, N.Y.)

== Masters' progress ==
=== Preliminary rounds ===
Episode	Winner(s)	2nd Place	3rd Place	4th Place	5th Place	6th Place
1	Susan Feniger; Tony Mantuano; 16½ Stars		Jerry Traunfeld; Ana Sortun; 15 Stars		Govind Armstrong; Jimmy Bradley; 12½ Stars	
2	Carmen Gonzalez; 15½ stars	Marcus Samuelsson; 14½ stars	Monica Pope; 13 stars	Thierry Rautureau; 11 stars	David Burke; 10 stars	
3	Jonathan Waxman; 18½ stars	Rick Moonen; 16 stars	Wylie Dufresne; 14½ stars	Graham Elliot Bowles; 13½ stars	Ludo Lefebvre; 11 stars	Mark Peel; 9½ stars
4	Susur Lee; 19½ stars	Jody Adams; 14½ stars	Maria Hines; 13½ stars	Rick Tramonto; 13 stars	Debbie Gold; 10½ stars	

(QF WIN) The team or chef won that episode's Quickfire challenge.
(HS WIN) The chef won a High Stakes Quickfire and won a guaranteed spot in the champions' round.

Note: The chefs who received first and/or second place in the preliminary rounds move onto the champions' round.

== Champions' round ==
Episodes	5	6	7	8	9	Finale	Cumulative Winnings
Quickfire; Winner	Rick; Jonathan; Susan; Jody	Rick	Susan	Rick	Marcus	None	
Marcus	LOW	LOW	HIGH	HIGH	WIN	WINNER	$115,000
Susur	IN	WIN	HIGH	LOW	HIGH	RUNNER-UP^{1}	$20,000
Rick	IN	HIGH	LOW	WIN	LOW	RUNNER-UP^{1}	$22,500
Jonathan	HIGH	LOW	LOW	LOW	OUT		$17,500
Susan	IN	IN	WIN	OUT			$32,500
Tony	IN	IN	OUT				$15,000
Jody	WIN	OUT					$17,500
Carmen	OUT						$10,000

^1 Susur Lee and Rick Moonen tied for second with 17 stars each.

(WINNER) The chef won the season and was crowned Top Chef: Master.
(RUNNER-UP) The chef was a runner-up for the season.
(WIN) The chef won that episode's elimination challenge.
(HIGH) The chef had one of the highest scores, but was not named the winner.
(IN) The chef was declared safe and wasn't eliminated, moved on in champions' round.
(LOW) The chef had one of the lowest scores, but was not eliminated.
(OUT) The chef lost that week's challenge and was eliminated.

== Episodes ==
In each episode, the chefs compete to win money for their charity. The Elimination Round winners are awarded cash donations ($10,000) for their charities. For each of the first four episodes, five or six chefs compete out of the twenty-two and two chefs of their group move forward to the Champions Round. Episode format: Each episode consists of a Quickfire and an Elimination challenge. The Quickfire is a short, simple challenge that can vary from cooking, tasting or a food-related task (e.g., peeling a certain amount of apples to certain quality standard in a limited amount of time). The Elimination challenge is a more complex challenge which usually requires cooking a meal for many people with certain requirements. The chefs are scored based on how well they execute in the Elimination and Quickfire challenges. Scoring: Unlike Season 1, where the Quickfire was scored on a scale of one to five stars, there are no stars won during the Quickfire, and instead, the winner(s) of the Quickfire will receive $5,000 for their charity or charities. The Elimination challenge is scored on a scale of one to 20 stars (five stars given by the tasters, and fifteen given by the three critics). A chef can thus win a maximum of 20 stars. The two chefs with the most stars at the end of the Elimination challenge are considered the winners and move on to the Champions Round. The eight total winners then meet up for the final weeks when one person will be eliminated in each episode until the finale where one winner is crowned Top Chef Master. The winning chef receives $100,000 for his or her designated charity.

=== Episode 1: First Date Dinner ===
Ana Sortun, Govind Armstrong, Jerry Traunfeld, Jimmy Bradley, Susan Feniger, and Tony Mantuano are the first group of chefs competing for two spots in the Champions Round.

- Quickfire Challenge: In teams of two, the Masters are challenged to create a dish using ingredients from a gas station in Chinatown.
  - Anna Sortun and Jerry Traunfeld (Crispy Rice Cake with "Clamesco" Sauce)
  - Govind Armstrong and Jimmy Bradley (Cheetos Macaroni with Grilled Slim Jims and Tomato Soup)
  - Susan Feniger and Tony Mantuano (Maple Bread Pudding with Caramelized Bananas)
    - WINNERS: Susan Feniger and Tony Mantuano
- Elimination Challenge: Love is in the air as the Masters (still in their teams) are challenged to evoke their sensual side using known aphrodisiac ingredients in the creation of a sumptuous meal to suit couples on a first date.
  - Anna Sortun and Jerry Traunfeld (Duck Leg in Vermicelli with Orange Blossom Smoked Cinnamon Almonds; Lavender Duck Breast with Red Cabbage, Pomegranate and Beets)
  - Govind Armstrong and Jimmy Bradley (Roast Lamb with Cauliflower Couscous & Pomegranate Reduction; Seared Lamb Carpaccio with Baby Arugula and Herb Salad)
  - Susan Feniger and Tony Mantuano (Black Pepper Shrimp and Scallop; Homemade Pasta with Cheese, Mushrooms and Truffles)
    - WINNERS: Susan Feniger and Tony Mantuano (16½ Stars)
    - ELIMINATED:
      - Ana Sortun and Jerry Traunfeld (15 Stars)
      - Govind Armstrong and Jimmy Bradley (12½ Stars)

=== Episode 2: It's My Party ===
Carmen Gonzalez, David Burke, Marcus Samuelsson, Monica Pope, and Thierry Rautureau are the second group of chefs competing for two spots in the Champions Round.

- Quickfire Challenge: The chefs must put a twist on the classic grilled cheese sandwich.
  - Carmen Gonzalez (Italian Baguette with Manchego, Garlic, Cilantro and Lime)
  - David Burke (Triple Cream Cheese with Prosciutto, Almonds, Tomato and Rosemary)
  - Marcus Samuelsson (Grilled Gruyere and Cheddar with Gazpacho and Salad)
  - Monica Pope (Feta Cheese on Raisin Nut Bread with Basil, Cilantro and Mint Salad)
  - Thierry Rautureau (Grilled Taleggio and Goat Cheese with Olives, Harissa and a Pear, Pine Nut, and Baby Arugula Salad)
    - WINNER: Monica Pope
- Elimination Challenge: The chefs must create a "soul food" inspired dish for Mekhi Phifer's birthday party.
  - Carmen Gonzalez (Oyster and Hot Sausage Stew with Cilantro)
  - David Burke (Sweet Potato Custard with Green Beans, Corn and Crab BBQ, Pickled Watermelon Rind and Hush Puppies)
  - Marcus Samuelsson (BBQ Chicken with Mac & Cheese and Collard Greens)
  - Monica Pope (Shrimp and Grits, Mac and Cheese Style with Smokin' Okra, Pickled Green Beans and Tomato Jam)
  - Thierry Rautureau (Moroccan Spiced Pork Shoulder, Farro, Roasted Cauliflower, and Brussels Sprout Slaw)
    - WINNERS: Carmen Gonzalez (15½ stars) and Marcus Samuelsson (14½ stars)
    - ELIMINATED:
      - Monica Pope (13 stars)
      - Thierry Rautureau (11 stars)
      - David Burke (10 stars)

=== Episode 3: Pub Food ===
Season 1 Veterans Graham Elliot Bowles, Jonathan Waxman, Ludo Lefevbre, Mark Peel, Rick Moonen, and Wylie Dufresne are the third group of chefs competing for two spots in the Champions Round.

- Quickfire Challenge: The chefs must create a dish to pair with a Stolichnaya Vodka cocktail.
  - Graham Elliot Bowles (Crudo of Black Cod with Edamame and Red Onion Salad) (paired with Coriander Mule)
  - Jonathan Waxman (Pork Tenderloin and Poblano Stuffed Shrimp with Avocado Butter) (paired with Lemongrass Mojito)
  - Ludo Lefebvre (Roasted Pork Chop with Rosemary, Thyme, and Garlic) (paired with Nutmeg Applik Mojito)
  - Mark Peel (Mussel Custard with Kaffir Lime and Figs) (paired with Ginger Figgle)
  - Rick Moonen (Cream Biscuit Berry Shortcake) (paired with Forest Fruits)
  - Wylie Dufresne (Arctic Char with Lentils, Bacon, Crispy Potatoes, and Lemon Yogurt) (paired with Russian Tea Room)
    - WINNER: Jonathan Waxman
- Elimination Challenge: The chefs are challenged to create an upscale version of traditional pub food.
  - Graham Elliot Bowles (Roasted Beef Tenderloin, Chanterelle Puree, and Bacon-Kidney Vinaigrette) – Steak and Kidney Pie
  - Jonathan Waxman (Lamb, Mashed Potatoes, and Parmesan Cheese) – Shepherd's Pie
  - Ludo Lefebvre (Beef Tenderloin, Potatoes Confit, Roasted Peanuts with Miso, and Guinness Caramel) – Irish Stew
  - Mark Peel (Seafood Sausage, Onion Sauce with Lobster Broth, and Mustard Greens) – Toad in a Hole
  - Rick Moonen (Chicken Fried Sable, Lemon Confit Tartar Sauce, Twice Fried Potatoes, and Fennel Slaw) – Fish & Chips
  - Wylie Dufresne (Bangers, Smoked Mashed Potatoes, Onion Jus, and Snow Peas) – Bangers & Mash
    - WINNERS: Jonathan Waxman (18½ stars) and Rick Moonen (16 stars)
    - ELIMINATED:
      - Wylie Dufresne (14½ stars)
      - Graham Elliot Bowles (13½ stars)
      - Ludo Lefebvre (11 stars)
      - Mark Peel (9½ stars)

=== Episode 4: Cast and Crew Meal ===
Debbie Gold, Jody Adams, Maria Hines, Rick Tramonto, and Susur Lee are the fourth and final group of chefs competing for two spots in the Champions Round.

- Quickfire Challenge: The chefs must create a perfectly styled fruit plate presentation. In addition, this Quickfire was a High Stakes Quickfire, so the winner of this Quickfire was guaranteed a spot in the Champion's Round, regardless of how that chef did in the Elimination Challenge.
  - Debbie Gold (Pecan Tempura Stuffed Fig with Persimmon and Tangerine) – 3½ stars
  - Jody Adams (Fig and Walnut Tart with Pomegranate Syrup and Zabaglione) – 4 stars
  - Maria Hines (Northwest Trio: Apple Soup, Grilled Fig, and Berries with Berry Mousse) – 3 stars
  - Rick Tramonto (Herb and Fruit Shooters) – 3½ stars
  - Susur Lee ("East Meets West" Fruit Plate with Blackberry "Ravioli" and Thai Basil) – 2½ stars
    - WINNER: Jody Adams
- Elimination Challenge: The chefs must create and modernize a "family meal" for the cast and crew of Modern Family.
  - Debbie Gold (Glazed Pork Loin with Apple Butter and Winter Squash Slaw)
  - Jody Adams (Braised Chicken Thighs with Mushrooms, Semolina Gnocchi, and Herb Salad)
  - Maria Hines (Sockeye Salmon, Paprika Potatoes, Almond Slivers, and Almond Milk)
  - Rick Tramonto (Truffled White Beans with Escarole and Grilled Sausage)
  - Susur Lee (Roast Chicken and Farce Curry, Polenta and Grits, Tomato Jam, and Chili Mint Chutney)
    - WINNERS: Susur Lee (19½ stars) and Jody Adams (14½ stars)
    - ELIMINATED:
      - Maria Hines (13½ stars)
      - Rick Tramonto (13 stars)
      - Debbie Gold (10½ stars)

=== Episode 5: Wedding Wars ===
- Quickfire Challenge: The chefs are required to team up four to four and compete in a tag-team cook-off, with Jay Rayner serving as judge. First, the chefs pick a pot with a colored apron inside. Next, the teams are to decide what order they would cook in, but they are not allowed to communicate with each other in regards to the components of their dish and the chefs will wear blindfolds until they are tagged to start cooking. The teams have 40 minutes total (10 minutes individually) to alternate execution of the dish. The winning quickfire team will split $10,000 amongst their charities ($2,500 each). The winners will also receive a second advantage for the Elimination Challenge. The teams cooked in the following respective order:
  - Red Team: Susur Lee, Tony Mantuano, Marcus Samuelsson, Carmen Gonzalez (Pan Seared Sea Bass and Prosciutto with a Truffle Spiced Shellfish Broth) – 4 stars
  - Blue Team: Susan Feniger, Jody Adams, Rick Moonen, Jonathan Waxman (Mussel and Scallop Stew with Orange and Fennel) – 4½ stars
    - WINNERS: Blue Team; Won $10,000 to split amongst each other.
- Elimination Challenge: The teams are challenged to Season 4's most grueling challenge, "Wedding Wars". In the teams used for the Quickfire, the chefs must cater a 150-guest wedding. Each team will prepare a different menu, one team responsible for meeting the bride's requests, while the other for the groom. Each team is also required to create their own wedding cake, one meeting the bride's requests, and one for the groom's requests. The Blue Team, as the winners of the Quickfire, decide to cater for the bride, and decide to stay away from the groom's limited palate. The wedding is to take place the next day, and the teams are given 45 minutes to discuss and plan the menu with the bride or groom, $5000 to shop at both a large food warehouse and Whole Foods Market, and 6 hours of preparation time in the Top Chef kitchen followed by 6 additional hours to cook at the banquet.
- Red Team
  - Appetizers: Lobster Roll with Asian Pear (Samuelsson); Honey Mustard Cured Tuna (Samuelsson); Jumbo Lump Crab cake with Avocado Relish (Gonzalez)
  - Main Dishes: Flaming Ouzo Shrimp (Mantuano); Au Gratin Potatoes (Mantuano); Pasta with Fire-Roasted Tomatoes, Capers, and Feta (Mantuano); Roasted Corn Salsa (Gonzalez); Roast Beef Tenderloin with Grilled Onion Ragout and Pomegranate Sauce (Samuelsson)
  - Wedding Cake: French Wedding Cake: Croquembouche (Lee)
  - Desserts: Upside Down Raisin Pudding with Butterscotch Sauce (Lee); Chocolate Profiterole and Whipped Cream (Lee); Carrot Cake (Lee)
- Blue Team
  - Appetizers: Potatoes Bhajia with Mint Cilantro Sauce and Tamarind Date Chutney (Feniger); Red Pepper Pancakes with Smoked Salmon, Caviar, and Lemon Zest (Waxman); Pancetta and Melted Raclette Tart (Adams)
  - Main Dishes: Dijon Rack of Lamb with Rosemary, Farro, and Autumn Vegetables (Adams); Roast Chicken with Tarragon Velouté and Cauliflower Purée (Waxman); "Seafood Mixed Grill": Opah, Coho Salmon, and Swordfish on Sweet and Sour Eggplant (Moonen)
  - Wedding Cake: Egyptian Semolina Cake with Berries and Cream (Feniger)
  - Dessert: Bananas Foster with Candied Pecans and Rum Caramel Sauce (Adams)
    - WINNING TEAM: Blue Team
    - INDIVIDUAL WINNER: Jody Adams
    - ELIMINATED: Carmen Gonzalez (11 stars)

=== Episode 6: Scary Surf and Turf ===
- Quickfire Challenge: Each chef must create a dish inspired by a character from The Simpsons.
  - Susan Feniger (Millet Crispy Treats with Peanut Butter Chips, Donuts, and Mexican Hot Chocolate) (Moe) – 4 stars
  - Tony Mantuano (Fried Bacon Honey Pizza Dough with Boozy Coffee) (Chief Wiggum) – 3 stars
  - Marcus Samuelsson (Tomato Soup with Rice, Chickpeas, Chutney, Melon, and Nuts) (Apu) – 4 stars
  - Jonathan Waxman (Spaghetti Bambino with Grilled Tomato, Ham, and Cheese Sandwich) (Bart) – 4 stars
  - Rick Moonen (Shrimp "Sloppy D'oh!" with Truffle Chips and Beer) (Homer) – 4½ stars
  - Jody Adams (Cracked Wheat Salad with Goat's Milk Ricotta, Barbecued Beets, and Baked Kale Chips) (Lisa) – 4 stars
  - Susur Lee (Purple Potatoes, Pan Roasted Pork Chop, and Glazed Grapes with Mustard Sauce) (Marge) – 3½ stars
    - WINNER: Rick Moonen
- Elimination Challenge: The chefs are asked to create a "surf and turf" dish using exotic proteins, such as geoduck, monkfish liver, sea cucumber, jumbo squid, goat leg, duck tongue, black chicken, and kangaroo. This elimination challenge was originally used in season 3.
  - Susan Feniger (Marinated Sea Cucumber, Fried Sea Cucumber, and Kangaroo with Juniper Sauce) – Top 4
  - Tony Mantuano (Crostino with Calamari in Zimino, Braised Goat Sauce, and Goat Cheese Ravioli) – Top 4
  - Marcus Samuelsson (Geoduck and Kangaroo Sausage, Geoduck with Couscous, and Geoduck and Kangaroo Tartare) – 11½ stars
  - Jonathan Waxman (Giant Squid Fritto Misto, Fried Duck Tongue, and Fideo with Duck Tongue) – 11 stars
  - Rick Moonen (Poached Black Chicken Mousse and Roulade, Monkfish Liver Torchon, and Buttered Leeks) – 16½ stars
  - Jody Adams (Sicilian Spiced Roast Goat, Geoduck and Chickpea Chowder, and Homemade Harissa) – 10½ stars
  - Susur Lee (Poached Monkfish Liver, Black Chicken, Black Chicken Velouté, and Black Chicken with Monkfish Liver) – 19 stars
    - WINNER: Susur Lee (19 stars)
    - ELIMINATED: Jody Adams (10½ stars)

=== Episode 7: Tailgating ===
- Quickfire Challenge: Each chef must create a dish using leg proteins.
  - Susan Feniger (Cumin-Cilantro Chicken with Pickled Tomatoes on Quinoa and Raisin Pilaf) – 4½ stars
  - Tony Mantuano (Warm Crab and Potato Salad with Three Types of Coriander) – 3½ stars
  - Marcus Samuelsson (Confit of Frog Legs with Curry Broth and Crab Rice) – 3 stars
  - Jonathan Waxman (Capellini with King Crab Leg, Jalapeños, and Mint) – 3½ stars
  - Rick Moonen (Egg in a Hole with Roasted Octopus Leg and Bérnaise Sauce) – 3 stars
  - Susur Lee (Indochine Roasted Leg of Lamb with Lamb Meatballs, Pine Nuts, and Dry Cherry Sauce) – 4 stars
    - WINNER: Susan Feniger
- Elimination Challenge: The contestants are asked to create dishes for a tailgating party at a University of Southern California football game. The chefs are given preparation time both at the Top Chef kitchen and at the field, prior to serving, on grills. This elimination challenge was originally used in season 4.
  - Susan Feniger (Skirt Steak Tacos with Black Bean and Corn Salsa and Roasted Pepper Salsas) – 16 stars
  - Tony Mantuano (Grilled Pizza with Mozzarella, Tomatoes, Romano, Arugula, and Prosciutto) – 10 stars
  - Marcus Samuelsson (Grilled Chicken and Shrimp Soup with Grilled Vegetable Couscous and a Burger) – 14½ stars
  - Jonathan Waxman (New York Steak Tacos with Grilled Vegetables and Bordelaise Sauce) – 10½ stars
  - Rick Moonen (Chermoula Grilled Chicken with Baba Ganoush and Spicy Slaw on Pita Bread) – 13½ stars
  - Susur Lee (Korean Style Skirt Steak with Roasted Cauliflower and Austrian Dumplings) – 15 stars
    - WINNER: Susan Feniger (16 stars)
    - ELIMINATED: Tony Mantuano (10 stars)

=== Episode 8: Food of the Gods ===
- Quickfire Challenge: The five remaining chefs compete in a game of "Identify That Ingredient" which was originally used in season 5. The chefs pick pots to determine their opponent for round one. Since there are an odd number of chefs, one chef receives a pass to round two. Each pair is given 15 seconds to taste a specific sauce and each chef in the pair must then bid on the number of ingredients they think they can correctly name. Bids pass back and forth until one chef challenges the other to match the last placed bid. If a complete list of correct ingredients is given, the challenged chef moves on to the next round. Naming any incorrect ingredient ends the round and the challenger moves on. The round one opponents are Marcus Samuelsson vs. Susur Lee and Susan Feniger vs. Rick Moonen, with Jonathan Waxman receiving the pass to round two.
  - Round One: Blended Chasseur
    - Winners: Jonathan (free pass), Rick, Susur
  - The final two rounds were in a spelling bee-style format. The remaining chefs must name a correct ingredient until a chef has named an incorrect ingredient.
  - Round Two: Thai Green Curry
    - Winners: Rick, Susur
  - Round Three: Lobster Sauce
    - WINNER: Rick Moonen
- Elimination Challenge: The chefs are challenged to create dishes inspired by a Greek god. First, the chefs draw knives with names of various Greek gods. Chefs are told they will be making tasting portions for fifty diners and will have four hours to complete their dishes.
  - Susan Feniger (Toast with Coconut Jam and Sweet Butter, Fried Egg with White Pepper and Dark Soy) (Aphrodite) – 10½ stars
  - Marcus Samuelsson (Cured Beef and Salmon with Apple Broth and Oyster Foam) (Ares) – 15½ stars
  - Jonathan Waxman (Seared Scallops, Romesco Sauce, Cherry Tomatoes, String Beans, and Celery Purée) (Poseidon) – 12½ stars
  - Rick Moonen (Spice Crusted Swordfish, Crimson Potatoes, Daikon, Radishes, and Parsnips) (Hades) – 18 stars
  - Susur Lee (Roasted Pork Loin in Chinese Wine and Croquette with Feta and Santorini Olives) (Dionysus) – 15 stars
    - WINNER: Rick Moonen (18 stars)
    - ELIMINATED: Susan Feniger (10½ stars)

=== Episode 9: Improv ===
- Quickfire Challenge: The four remaining chefs are given 45 minutes to create a dish from a recipe included in a cookbook of one of the other chefs. Halfway through their cooking time, the chefs are told to convert their dishes into soups while still retaining the original recipe's integrity. A variation of this Quickfire Challenge was originally used in season 5.
  - Marcus Samuelsson (Chicken Soup with Crispy Tortilla Chips and Avocado Goat Cheese Guacamole) – 4½ stars
  - Jonathan Waxman (Chicken Thai Curry Soup with Thai Basil) – 3 stars
  - Rick Moonen (Scallop, Mussel & Pancetta Asian Style Cioppino) – 3½ stars
  - Susur Lee (Tunisian Fish Soup with Olives, Capers, White Wine, Cumin and Coriander Seeds) – 4 stars
    - WINNER: Marcus Samuelsson
- Elimination Challenge: The chefs attend a performance of the improvisational comedy troupe, The Groundlings. During the performance, the actors obtained combinations of a color, emotion, and ingredient from the audience. The chefs must create a meal encompassing these traits. A variation of this Elimination Challenge was originally used in season 4.
  - Marcus Samuelsson (Violet, Pleasure, Salmon) (Confit of Salmon with Caviar, Shrimp and Sake) – 17½ stars
  - Jonathan Waxman (Burnt Sienna, Depression, Avocado) (Mesquite Grilled Chicken Breast, French Fries, Yams and Avocado with Grapefruit) – 11½ stars
  - Rick Moonen (Red, Anger, Bacon) (Pork Loin with Poached Oysters, Bacon and Spicy Kim Chee with Maudite Beer) – 13½ stars
  - Susur Lee (Chocolate, Lust, Peanut Butter) (Chocolate Mousse Infused with Coriander and a Caramel Peanut Butter Mousse and a Chocolate Crumble) – 17 stars
    - WINNER: Marcus Samuelsson (17½ stars)
    - ELIMINATED: Jonathan Waxman (11½ stars)

=== Episode 10: Finale ===
- Final Challenge: In the last challenge of the season, the three remaining chefs are tasked with preparing a three-course meal that is their biography. The first course is their first cooking memory. The second course is the meal that inspired them to become a chef. The third course is what defines them as a chef. There are two twists in this episode. First, the diners include the finalists from the first season of Top Chef Masters, Rick Bayless, Michael Chiarello, and Hubert Keller, as well as Tom Colicchio, the head judge from Top Chef. Second, the sous chefs from each of the contestants' restaurants are brought in to help the respective chefs.
  - Marcus Samuelsson:
    - Smoked Char with Sweet Horseradish and Shellfish Broth with Apples, Celery Root and Mashed Root Vegetables
    - Salt-cured Duck with Foie Gras Flan, Sour Tomato Jam and Aged Balsamic
    - Berbere-flavored Hamachi Meatball, Porcini Couscous and Sea Urchin Froth
  - Rick Moonen:
    - Hamachi and Live Sea Scallop Crudo with Glazed Kusshi Oyster and American Sturgeon Caviar
    - Pork Belly with Poached Egg, Sardinian Gnocchi with Parmesan and White Truffle and Turnip
    - Venison with Espresso Salt and Pear Butter, Stuffed Cipollini Onions, Shiitake Mushrooms & Brussels Sprouts and Natural Jus with Red Wine Reduction
  - Susur Lee:
    - Steamed Scallop with Cantonese Black Bean Sauce and Shrimp and Crab Croquette with Chili Sauce
    - Tuna with Wasabi Mousse, Charred Sea Bream, and Artichoke, Asparagus and Daikon Salad with Ginger Flower
    - Lamb Thailandaise with Chiang Mai Sausage, Green Curry and Polenta
- WINNER: Marcus Samuelsson (17½ stars)
- RUNNERS-UP:
  - Susur Lee (17 stars)
  - Rick Moonen (17 stars)
