= 550 Madison Avenue =

Office skyscraper in Manhattan, New York

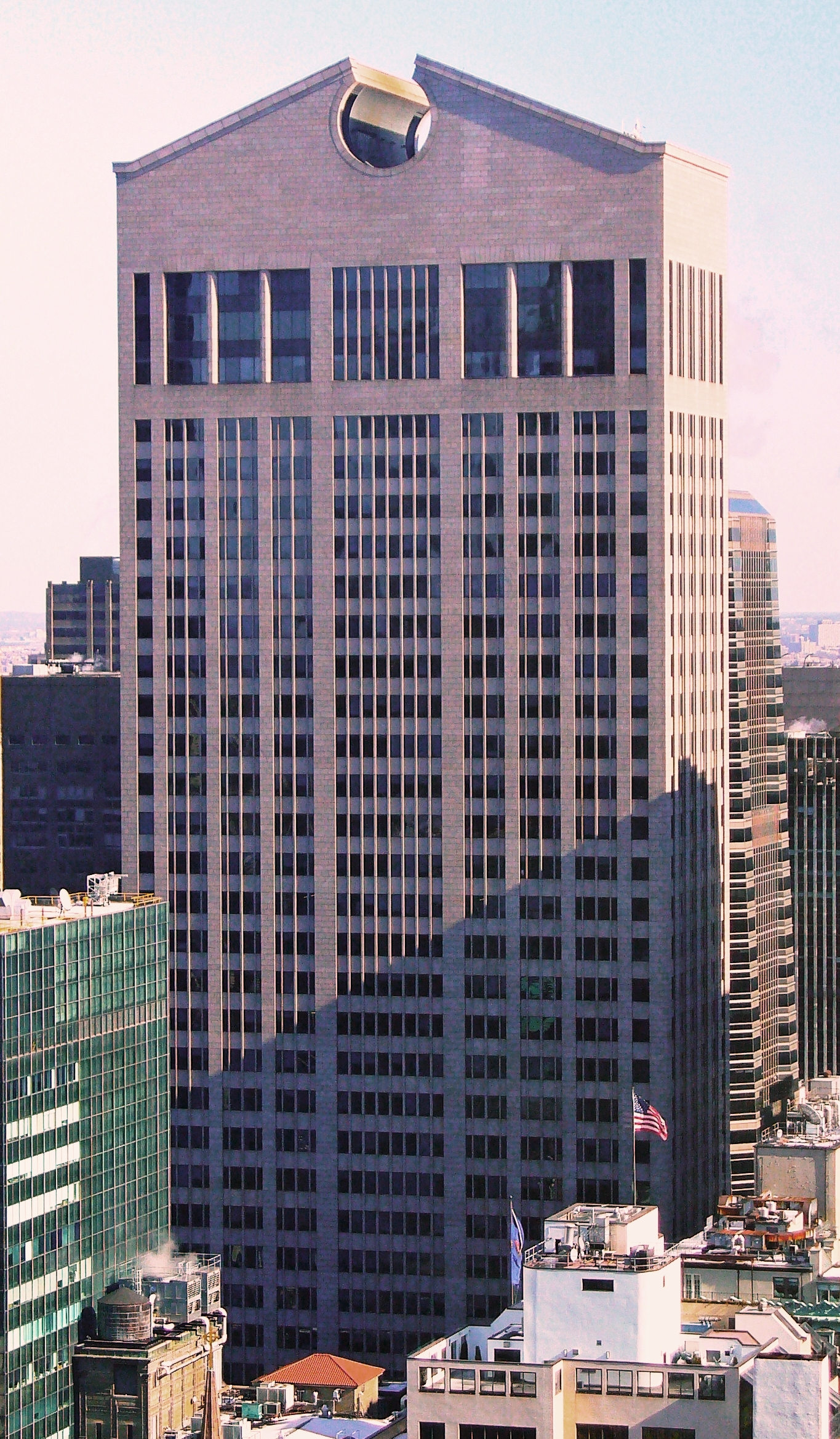
- Seen in 2007
- Alternative names: 550 Madison; AT&T Building; Sony Plaza; Sony Tower

General information
- Type: Office
- Architectural style: Postmodern
- Location: Manhattan, New York, United States
- Coordinates: 40°45′41″N 73°58′24″W
- Construction started: November 1978; 48 years ago
- Topped-out: November 18, 1981; 45 years ago
- Completed: 1984
- Opening: July 29, 1983; 43 years ago
- Cost: $200 million
- Owner: Olayan Group (Olayan America)

Height
- Roof: 647 ft (197 m)

Technical details
- Floor count: 37
- Floor area: 685,125 ft^{2} (63,650.2 m^{2})

Design and construction
- Architects: Philip Johnson and John Burgee (main architects); Simmons Architects (associate architect)
- Developer: AT&T Corp.
- Structural engineer: Leslie E. Robertson Associates; Cosentini Associates
- Main contractor: William Crow Construction, HRH Construction

New York City Landmark
- Designated: July 31, 2018
- Reference no.: 2600

550 Madison Avenue (also 550 Madison; formerly known as the Sony Tower, Sony Plaza, and AT&T Building) is a postmodern–style skyscraper on Madison Avenue between 55th and 56th Streets in the Midtown Manhattan neighborhood of New York City, New York, U.S. Designed by Philip Johnson and John Burgee with associate architect Simmons Architects, the building is a 647-foot-tall (197-meter), 37-story office tower with a facade made of pink granite. It was completed in 1984 as the headquarters of AT&T Corp. and later became the American headquarters of Sony. A four-story granite annex to the west was demolished and replaced with a shorter annex in the early 2020s.

A large entrance arch at the base of the building faces east toward Madison Avenue, flanked by arcades with smaller flat arches. A pedestrian atrium, running through the middle of the city block between 55th and 56th Streets, was also included in the design; a plaza was built in its place in the 2020s. The presence of the atrium enabled the building to rise higher without the use of setbacks because of a provision in the city's zoning codes. The ground-level lobby is surrounded by retail spaces, originally a public arcade. The office stories are accessed from a sky lobby above the base. There is a broken pediment with a circular opening atop the building. Opinion of 550 Madison Avenue has been mixed ever since its design was first announced in March 1978.

The AT&T Building at 550 Madison Avenue was intended to replace 195 Broadway, the company's previous headquarters in Lower Manhattan. Following the breakup of the Bell System in 1982, near the building's completion, AT&T spun off its subsidiary companies. As a result, AT&T never occupied the entire building as it had originally intended. Sony leased the building in 1991, substantially renovated the base and interior, and acquired the structure from AT&T in 2002. Sony sold the building to the Chetrit Group in 2013 and leased back its offices there, moving out after three years. The Olayan Group purchased 550 Madison Avenue in 2016 with plans to renovate it, and the New York City Landmarks Preservation Commission designated the building's exterior as a landmark in 2018. Olayan renovated the building in the late 2010s and early 2020s.

== Site ==
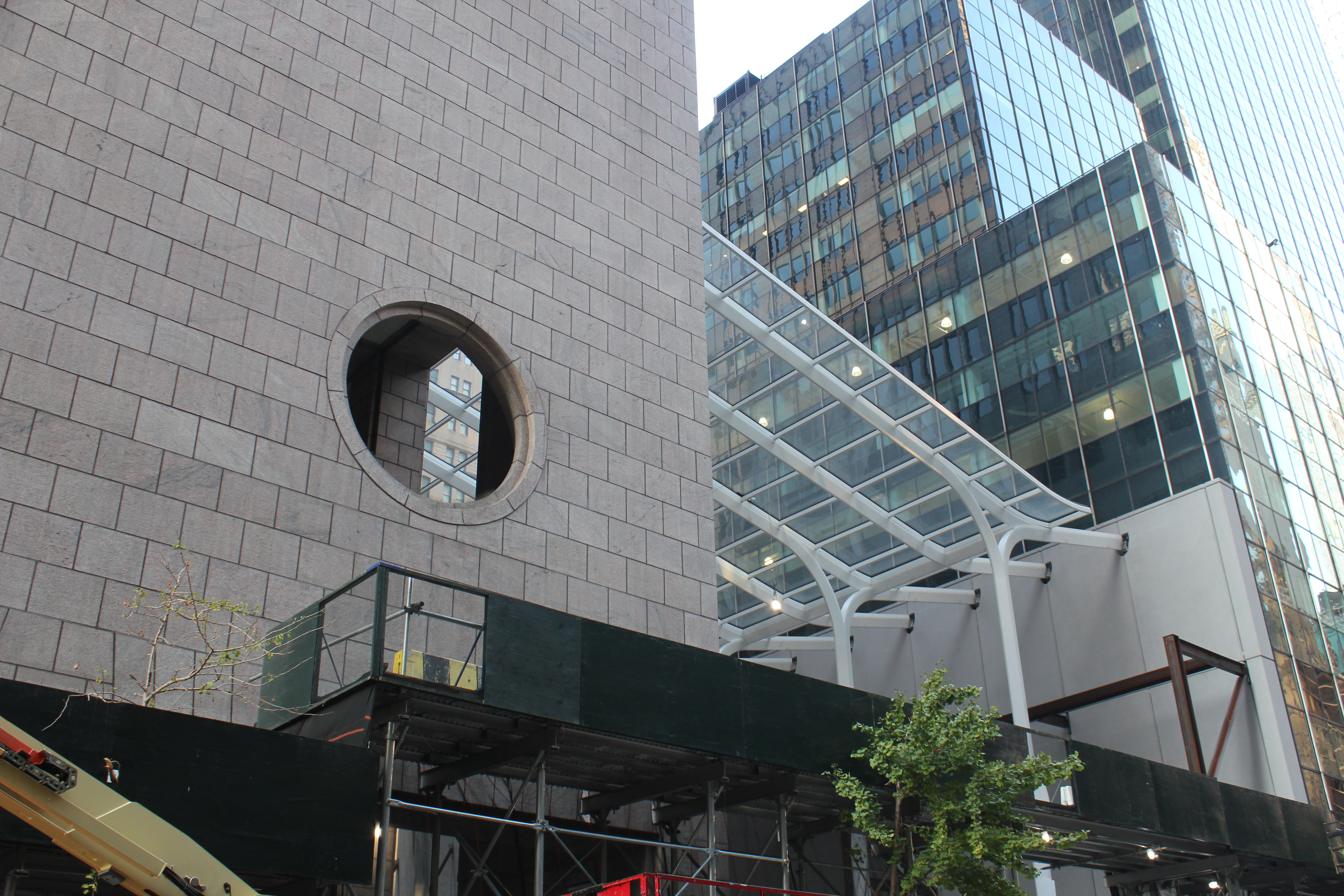
Looking west from 56th Street, with the atrium at center

550 Madison Avenue is in the Midtown Manhattan neighborhood of New York City. The rectangular land lot is bounded by Madison Avenue to the east, 56th Street to the north, and 55th Street to the south. The lot covers approximately 36,800 square feet (3,420 m^{2}), with a frontage of 200 feet (61 m) on Madison Avenue and 189 feet (58 m) on both 55th and 56th Streets. The building is on the same city block as the Corning Glass Building to the west. Other nearby buildings include St. Regis New York and 689 Fifth Avenue to the southwest, the Minnie E. Young House to the south, the New York Friars Club and Park Avenue Tower to the east, 432 Park Avenue to the northeast, 590 Madison Avenue to the north, and Trump Tower and the Tiffany & Co. flagship store to the northwest.

The site was occupied by a stream before being developed in the 1800s. The AT&T Building directly replaced fifteen smaller structures, including several four- and five-story residences dating from the late 19th century, which were converted into commercial stores in the mid-20th century. This stretch of Madison Avenue in Midtown was a prominent retail corridor during the 20th century, but new office buildings were developed on the avenue in the two decades after World War II ended. The site at 550 Madison Avenue was described by New York magazine as "unusually human" compared to Midtown's other office developments due to the neighborhood's relatively low height.

== Architecture ==
550 Madison Avenue was designed by Philip Johnson and John Burgee of Johnson/Burgee Architects. Johnson had been an influential figure in modernist architecture during the late 20th century, having helped design the Seagram Building nearby in the 1950s, but he reverted to more classical motifs for 550 Madison Avenue's design. The building was among Johnson and Burgee's most influential works and, according to the New York City Landmarks Preservation Commission (LPC), is sometimes described as the world's first postmodern–style skyscraper. Alan Ritchie of Johnson/Burgee was named as design manager, while Simmons Architects was the associate architect.

Engineers and contractors involved in the building's construction included structural engineer Leslie E. Robertson of Robertson & Fowler Associates; associate engineer Leroy Callender; foundation engineer Mueser, Rutledge, Johnston & DeSimone; mechanical engineer Cosentini Associates; and interior designer ISD Inc. Frank Briscoe was the construction manager, while William Crow Construction and HRH Construction were the general contractors. 550 Madison Avenue's developer, telecommunications firm AT&T Corp., had requested that the building use material obtained exclusively from the United States.

=== Form ===
The primary portion of the building is the 37-story office tower along Madison Avenue, on the eastern section of the land lot. The tower is 647 feet (197 m) tall, as measured from sidewalk level to the highest point of the tower's broken pediment. There are no setbacks. Unlike other postmodernist structures with irregular ground-level plans, 550 Madison Avenue was designed as a rectangle at ground level, similar to older International Style buildings. The tower stories have a footprint measuring 200 by 90 feet (61 by 27 m). (Note: The New York City Landmarks Preservation Commission describes the tower stories as measuring 200 by 100 feet (61 by 30 m), but also describes the 55th and 56th Street elevations as measuring 90 feet (27 m) wide.)

There was also a three- and four-story annex at the western end of the site. At the time of 550 Madison Avenue's construction, there was a lease on the adjacent Corning Glass Building that limited the height of any structures near that building to 60 feet (18 m) in height. This restriction included the westernmost lots of the AT&T site, so the roof of the annex was exactly 60 feet tall. Following an early-2020s renovation, the annex was demolished and replaced with a single-story annex.

=== Facade ===
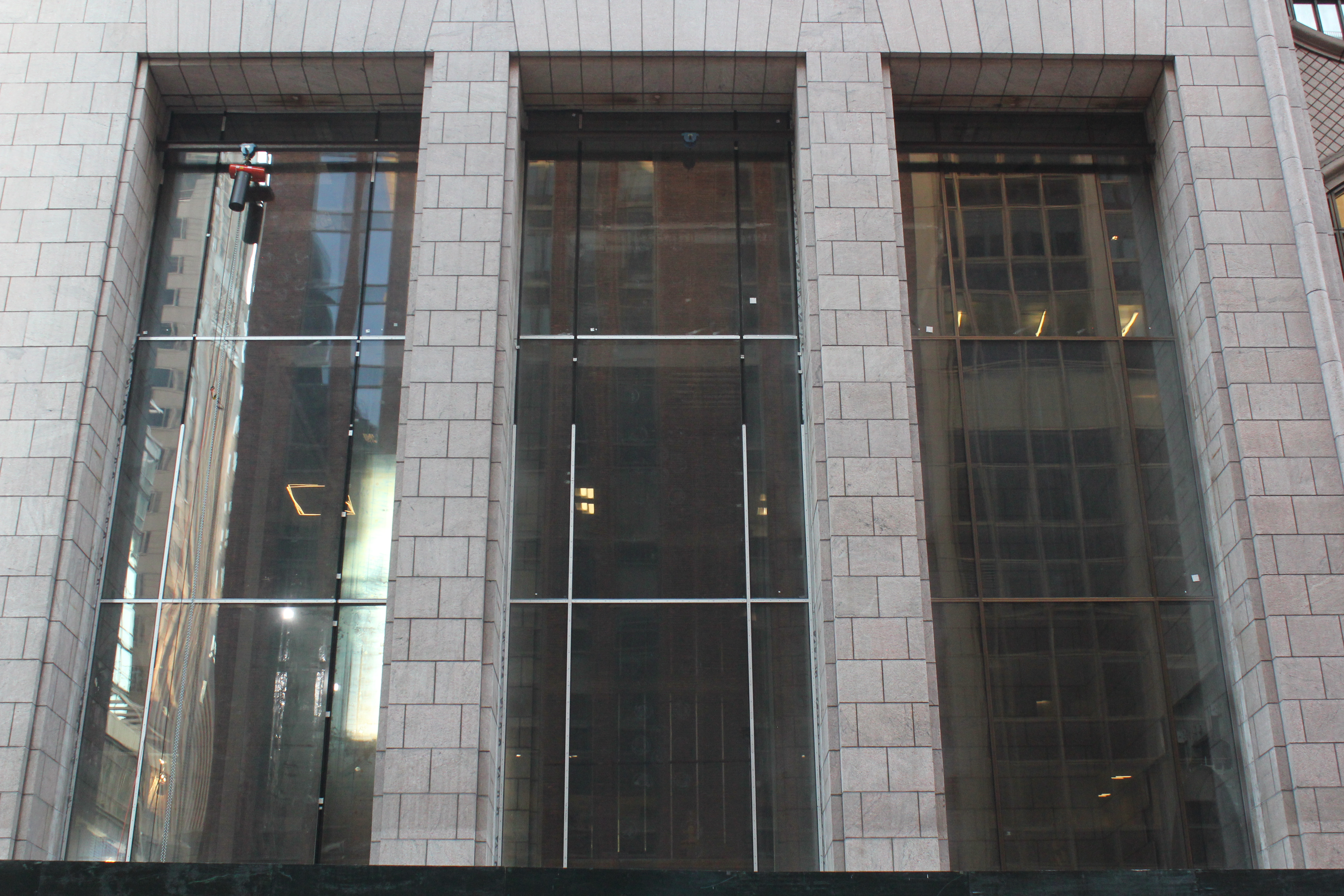
Tall rectangular windows on the lower section of the facade along Madison Avenue

550 Madison's articulation is inspired by that of classical buildings, with three horizontal sections similar to the components of a column: a base, shaft, and capital. The facade is clad with 60,000 pieces of roughly textured pink Stony Creek granite, weighing up to 7,000 pounds (3,200 kg) each, supplied by Castellucci & Sons from its Connecticut quarry. More than 13,000 short tons (12,000 long tons; 12,000 t) of granite is used, representing over 160,000 cubic feet (4,500 m^{3}) of the material. The stonework cost $25 million in total and required an additional 6,000 short tons (5,400 long tons; 5,400 t) of steel to support it. Varying reasons are given for the use of granite. Johnson considered pink granite as "simply the best" type of stone, and Ritchie said the Stony Creek pink granite had "more character" than granite from other sources. Burgee said the pink color was chosen to contrast with 590 Madison Avenue, the gray-green granite structure built simultaneously by IBM to the north.

The granite facade helped to reduce energy consumption compared to the glass curtain walls used on many of the city's contemporary skyscrapers. In 2020, during the building's renovation, it received an "A" grade on a citywide energy-efficiency ranking system. About one-third of the facade is clad in glass. When the plans were announced in 1978, Johnson claimed that the glass on the facade would make 550 Madison Avenue the city's "most energy-efficient structure". The windows are recessed into granite surrounds that are up to 10 inches (250 mm) deep. The architects had wanted deeper windows, but the high cost of the granite made this infeasible. Additionally, the round mullions of the original design were given a more rectangular shape, and the window arrangement was dictated by the interior use. The building also includes more than 1,000 pieces of brass manufactured by the Chicago Extruded Metals Company.

==== Base ====
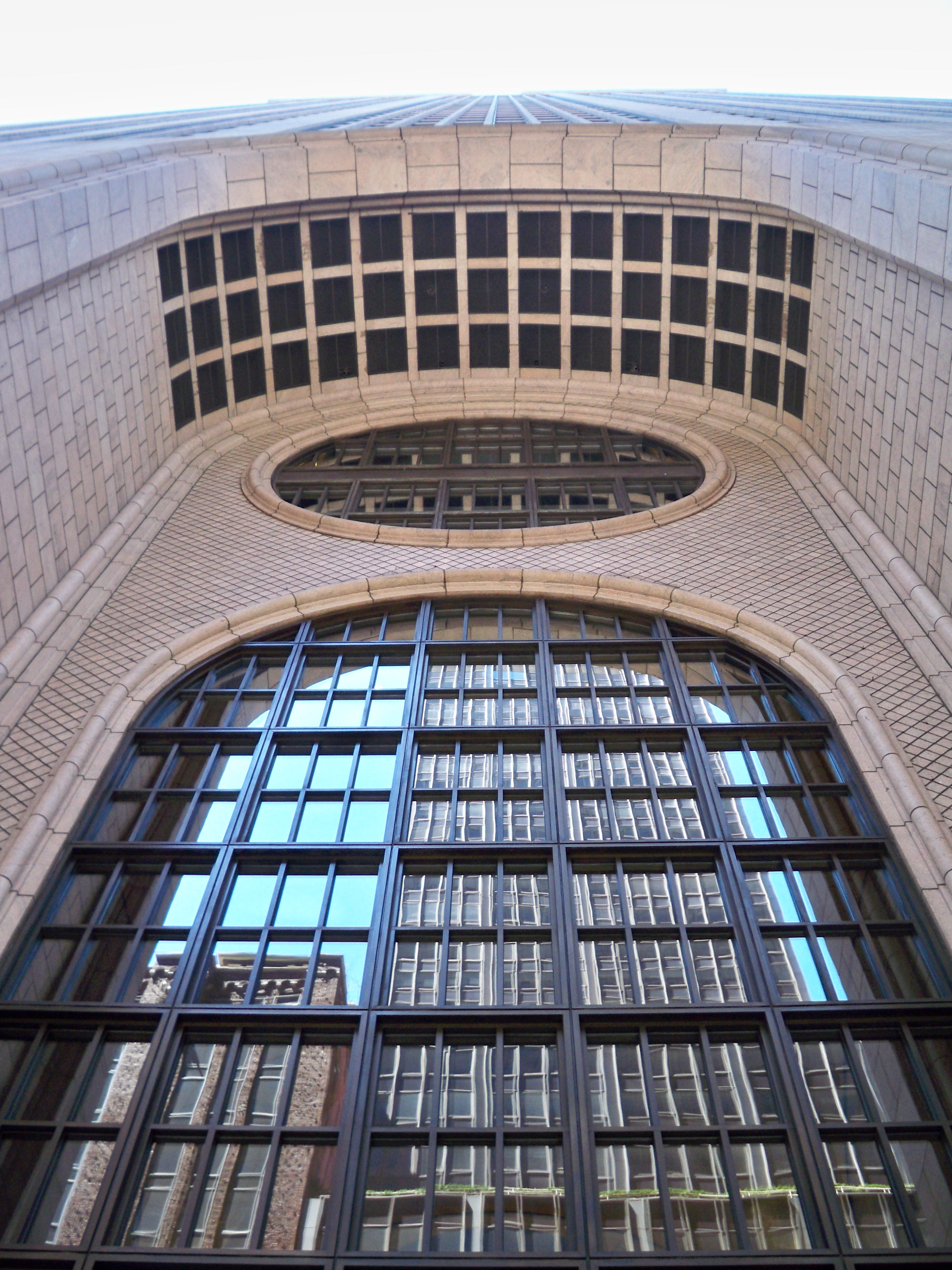
Main entrance

The main entrance on Madison Avenue consists of an archway measuring 116 feet (35 m) high. The arch is 50 feet (15 m) wide and recessed 20 feet (6.1 m) from the rest of the facade. Within the archway is a 70-foot (21 m) arched window, topped by a circular oculus with a 20-foot (6.1 m) radius. Both windows have glazed glass panels and vertical and horizontal bronze mullions. These windows are surrounded by stonework with rhombus tiles. The side walls of the arch have smaller round arches and rectangular stonework, while the top of the arch contains recessed rectangular lights. According to architectural writer Paul Goldberger, the arch may have been influenced by the Basilica of Sant'Andrea, Mantua. AT&T said the arch was supposed to make the building appear dominant and give it "a sense of dignity". To the left and right of the main entrance arch are three 60-foot-tall (18 m) rectangular openings. Each of these openings is 20 feet (6.1 m) wide, with voussoirs at their tops.

Originally, 550 Madison Avenue had an open-air arcade north and south of the central archway, extending west to the public atrium behind the building. The arcade, conceived as a 100-foot-high space, was downsized to 60 feet "for reasons of scale". (Note: The arcade height is also cited as 65 feet.) The presence of the arcade allowed for what Johnson described as "a more monumental building" with more floor area. There are 45 granite columns within the arcade, weighing 50 short tons (45 long tons; 45 t) apiece. The granite columns, which encase the building's steel frame, are designed to resemble load-bearing columns; they use thicker stone to represent solidity, and they have notches to represent depth. There was no retail space on the Madison Avenue front because, according to critic Nory Miller, "AT&T didn't want a front door sandwiched between a drug store and a lingerie shop." After the AT&T Building's opening, the arcade gained a reputation for being inhospitable, dark, and windy. Following a renovation in the 1990s, the arcade was enclosed with recessed display windows with grids of bronze mullions. When the windows were replaced in the early 2020s, transparent mullions were added.

At the extreme ends on Madison Avenue are single-story flat arches surmounted by flagpoles. These lead to recessed passages along 55th and 56th Streets, which act as an extension of the sidewalks on these streets. There are multicolored granite pavement tiles within these passages. The 55th and 56th Street elevations of the facade contain flat arches measuring 16 feet (4.9 m) tall, supported by granite-clad piers at regular intervals. Just above each flat arch is a circular opening with canted profiles, atop which are four vertically aligned rectangular openings. The circular openings were carved in false perspective, making the arcades on either side appear deeper than they actually were.

The granite wall of the original annex on 55th Street was windowless and had three garage doors. The granite wall on 56th Street had a tall window bay, a garage door, and a cornice.

==== Shaft ====
On all elevations of the facade, the intermediate stories are divided vertically into several bays, each of which has one single-pane window on each floor. The Madison Avenue (eastern) and western elevations of the facade are identical to each other, as are the 55th and 56th Street elevations. The western and eastern elevations are divided into nine bays each. The center bay is eight windows wide, with three sets of four windows on either side, as well as a wide single window at the extreme north and south ends. Granite spandrel panels separate the windows on different stories, except at the executive offices in the top three stories, which contained bays with glazed curtain walls. The northern and southern elevations are divided into six bays each, separated by granite piers. There are joints, or gaps, where the panels meet. The panels are further divided by shallower false joints, which resemble the real joints.

The granite panels are typically 2 or 5 inches (51 or 127 mm) thick, while the mullions are 6 or 10 inches (150 or 250 mm) square. The granite panels are extremely heavy, with many panels weighing over 1 short ton (0.89 long tons; 0.91 t), so they could not be hung onto the steel frame as with typical skyscrapers. Leslie Robertson determined that each granite panel had to be anchored individually to the steel frame, and the mounting apparatus had to be strong enough to support the weight of two panels.

==== Pediment ====
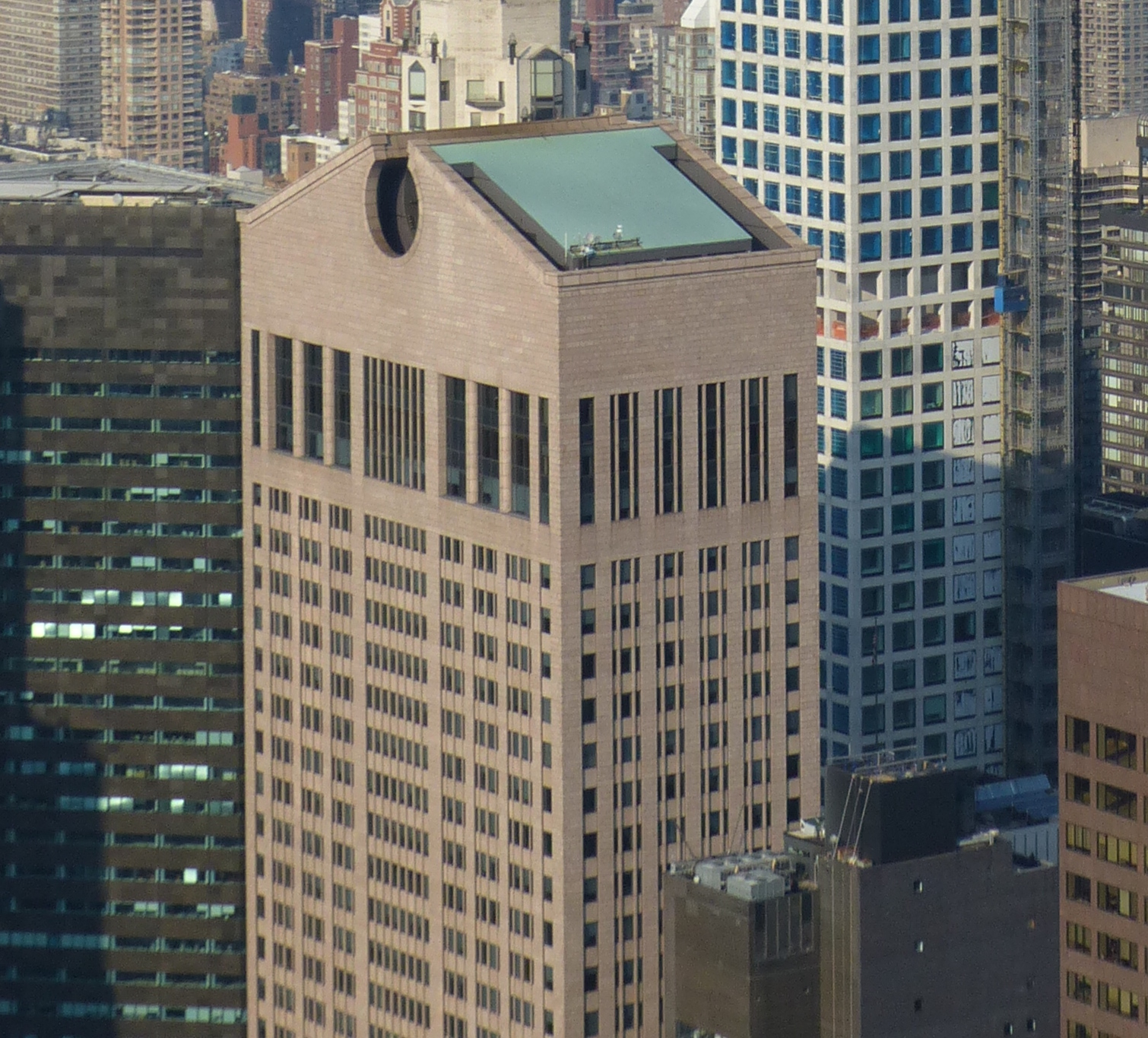
Pediment as seen in 2015

At the roof is a broken pediment, consisting of a gable that faces west toward Fifth Avenue and east of the Madison Avenue. The center of the pediment features a circular opening that extends the width of the roof. The opening measures 34 feet (10 m) across. Within the opening are ribbed slats, which contain vents for the building's HVAC system; according to Johnson, the vents were supposed to create steam puffs when there was a certain amount of moisture in the air. The remainder of the gable is trimmed with a stone coping. The granite slabs are suspended from a steel parapet, and the tops of the pediment flare horizontally outward.

The pediment, inspired by classical designs, was included to unify the symmetrical elevations of the facade. Johnson may have also been inspired by his dissatisfaction with the Citigroup Center's sloped roof, visible from his own office in the Seagram Building. Johnson/Burgee wanted to make the roof recognizable upon the skyline, and they decided upon a pediment because it was well suited for the narrow tower. During the design process, Johnson/Burgee had considered various ornamental designs before deciding on the circular notch. One of the previous buildings on the site, the Delman Building at 558 Madison Avenue, had a similar broken pediment, although Johnson denied claims it influenced 550 Madison Avenue's rooftop. Instead, Johnson claimed to have been inspired by Al-Khazneh in the Jordanian city of Petra. Observers likened the pediment to Baroque or Ancient Roman architecture, and they compared the steam puffs and night lighting to the work of Étienne-Louis Boullée. The pediment's design also drew comparisons to Chippendale furniture.

=== Features ===
550 Madison Avenue has a gross floor area of 685,125 square feet (63,650.2 m^{2}). The superstructure is composed of steel tubes, except at the base, where shear walls connect the sky lobby and foundation. The steel beams were constructed by Bethlehem Steel. The colonnade at the base was insufficient to protect against wind shearing. As a result, the core of the tower contains two concrete and steel "shear tubes", each measuring 25 by 31 feet (7.6 by 9.4 m). In addition to its 37 above-ground stories, the building is designed with three basements. One of these basement levels contained a 45-spot parking garage, originally meant for AT&T board members. There were also vehicular elevators for delivery trucks.

==== Lobbies ====
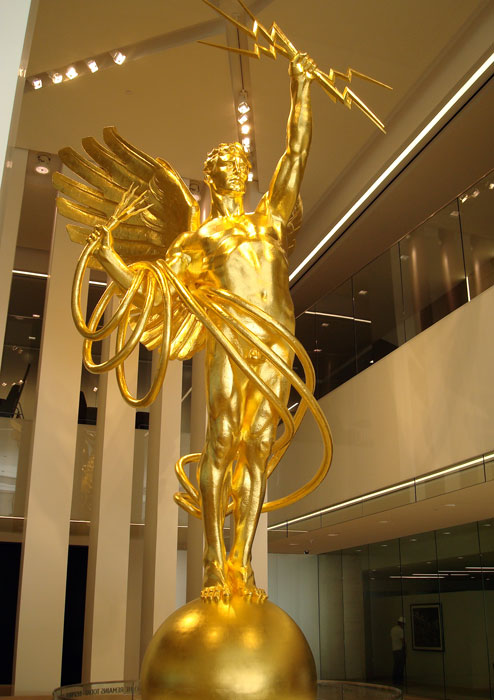
Spirit of Communication stood inside the main lobby from 1983 to 1992.

The building's main lobby is just inside the large arch on Madison Avenue. The lobby measures 50 by 50 feet (15 by 15 m) and originally contained a black-and-white marble floor and granite walls. The floor pattern was inspired by the designs of British architect Edwin Lutyens. The lobby's ceiling was a groin vault, and one wall of the main lobby contained an arcade with Byzantine-inspired column capitals. There were oculi on either end of the lobby and an elevator lobby with bronze elevator doors behind the Byzantine columns. After a 2020s renovation, the lobby was redesigned with large windows at its western end, as well as decorative materials like terrazzo, leather, and bronze mesh. The terrazzo floors incorporate some of the original marble flooring. The lowest portions of the lobby wall are decorated with the mesh, while the rest of the walls are covered in white marble. Solid Sky, a 20,000-pound (9,100-kilogram) spherical blue sculpture by Alicja Kwade, hangs in the lobby.

Spirit of Communication (also Golden Boy), a 20,000-pound (9,100-kilogram) bronze statue, was moved to 550 Madison Avenue's main lobby in 1983. Created by Evelyn Beatrice Longman in 1916, it had stood atop AT&T's previous headquarters at 195 Broadway. Johnson had suggested relocating Spirit of Communication to 550 Madison Avenue after AT&T CEO John D. deButts had suggested commissioning Isamu Noguchi to create a sculpture specifically for the building. Spirit of Communication depicts a 24-foot-tall (7.3 m) winged male figure on top of a globe, wrapped by cables, clutching bolts of electricity in his left hand. The statue was repainted in gold leaf when it was moved to 550 Madison Avenue. The statue was placed on a pedestal inside the lobby, with the circular window atop the main entrance arch seeming to form a halo above the statue. It was moved to AT&T's Basking Ridge, New Jersey, facility in 1992.

From the main lobby, elevators led to a sky lobby on the seventh floor, 77 feet (23 m) above ground level. The building's security checkpoints were originally in the sky lobby, which was accessible only to AT&T employees. The sky lobby was clad with veined Breccia Strazzema marble, with circular apertures, posts, and lintels made of the material; it was otherwise sparsely decorated. Between 1992 and 1994, after multimedia conglomerate Sony acquired the building, Dorothea Rockburne was hired to paint two abstract frescoes, and Gwathmey Siegel redesigned the lobby with wooden paneling and black glass. The frescoes, titled "Northern Sky" and "Southern Sky", measure 30 by 30 feet (9.1 by 9.1 m) and consist of red and yellow patterns with spheres. When the building was renovated in the 2020s, the Rockwell Group converted the sky lobby into an amenity space. The amenity spaces include a central lounge flanked by Rockburne's paintings, as well as four conference rooms, a small cafe, library, hearth room, pool room, screening room, and fitness center.

==== Atrium and annex ====
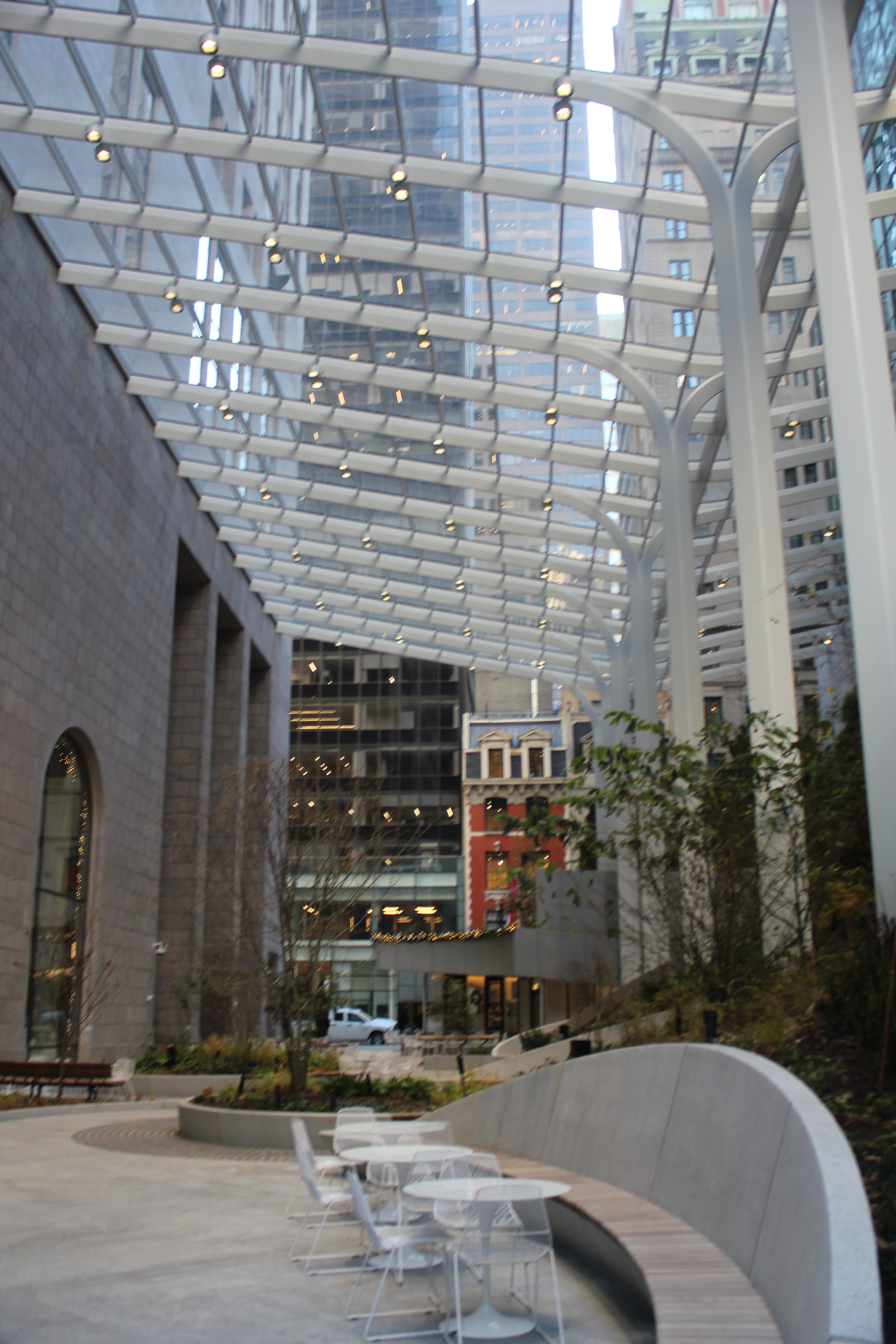
550 Madison Garden, seen in 2022

Between the annex to the west and the main tower to the east was an atrium measuring 40 feet (12 m) wide by 100 feet (30 m) tall. The public atrium between the annex and the tower was originally covered by a metal and glass roof, the ceiling of which was a half-barrel vault (shaped as a quarter-circle). The atrium directly faced that of the IBM Building at 590 Madison Avenue, and the presence of 550 Madison Avenue's atrium allowed additional floor area in the building. According to Burgee, he wanted the atrium to have a distinct identity from the office tower. The atrium, designed as an open-air pedestrian pathway, was enclosed in the 1990s when Sony moved to the building. A large television screen was installed with this renovation.

In the early 2020s, a new garden called 550 Madison Garden was constructed within the atrium. The garden contains shrubs, trees, bulbs, and perennial plants and is split into several sections. The space is open every day between 7 a.m. and 11 p.m. It is covered by a 70-foot-tall (21 m) metal-and-glass canopy, which collects 93,000 US gallons (350,000 L) of rainwater every year. The garden's greenery extends onto the roof of the rebuilt annex to the west. The atrium also includes a waterfall, seating areas, and circular floor pavers that demarcate various parts of the space; the seats can accommodate up to 260 people. The design details include poetry inscribed on the pavers, as well as a "steam pit" that is heated during the winter. As planned, the 550 Madison Garden also has bicycle racks, cafe, and restrooms.

The parking garage and truck elevators were in the annex, with a ramp to the garage from 56th Street and the elevators from 55th Street. The annex had its own lobby near 56th Street. There was also retail space within the original annex, facing the western wall of the atrium. Infoquest, an AT&T technology exhibit, was initially housed in the annex; it opened in 1986 (Note: For more information about Infoquest, see: AT&T InfoQuest Center Brochure. AT&T. 1986.) and operated until about 1993. The annex became the Sony Wonder Technology Lab museum in 1994; it was open on Tuesdays through Saturdays, and Sony described the free exhibits as a "technology and entertainment museum for all ages".

==== Office spaces ====
The fifth through thirty-third stories have offices. 550 Madison Avenue's height is equivalent to that of a 60-story building with 8-foot (2.4 m) ceilings, but the building has higher ceilings and thus fewer stories. At 550 Madison Avenue, ceilings were typically 10 feet (3.0 m) high, and executive suites had ceilings of 12 feet (3.7 m). At the time, computer hardware required taller ceilings than was usual. As originally designed, the acoustic ceiling panels had air conditioning vents and minimal ceiling lighting, as each worker's desk had task lighting. In addition to offices, the building included a two-story auditorium at the fifth and sixth stories, as well as a CCTV studio at the eighth story.

The office stories were generally less ornately decorated than the lobbies, but the executive offices on the thirty-third and thirty-fourth floors had elaborate wood paneling. AT&T had requested that the highest-quality materials be used, although escalating costs during construction led to the substitution of cheaper material in some places. The acoustic ceilings were manufactured by the Industrial Acoustics Company, which fabricated 325,000 square feet (30,200 m^{2}) of perforated steel panels clad with vinyl. In addition, AT&T bought $5.5 million worth of honey-colored Burmese teak furnishings such as paneling, trim, and doors from L. Vaughn Company, which hired 75 workers to supply the rare wood. The decorative materials used in the building included Burmese teak document cabinets, Turkish onyx elevator panels, Chinese silk in the employee dining room, and Italian leather in the executive dining room. Italian marble was used for the executive staircases.

After Sony moved into the building in 1992, Gwathmey Siegel renovated the interior with additional staircases, as well as doors topped with glass panels. The offices were refitted with sound systems and Sony videocassette recorder systems. The spaces were generally more flexible than under AT&T's occupancy, as they were meant to accommodate record and movie production. A conference center for Sony was also installed on the twenty-eighth floor. The AT&T executive offices on the thirty-fifth floor were retained, and an executives' dining club called the Sony Club was opened within the space.

== History ==
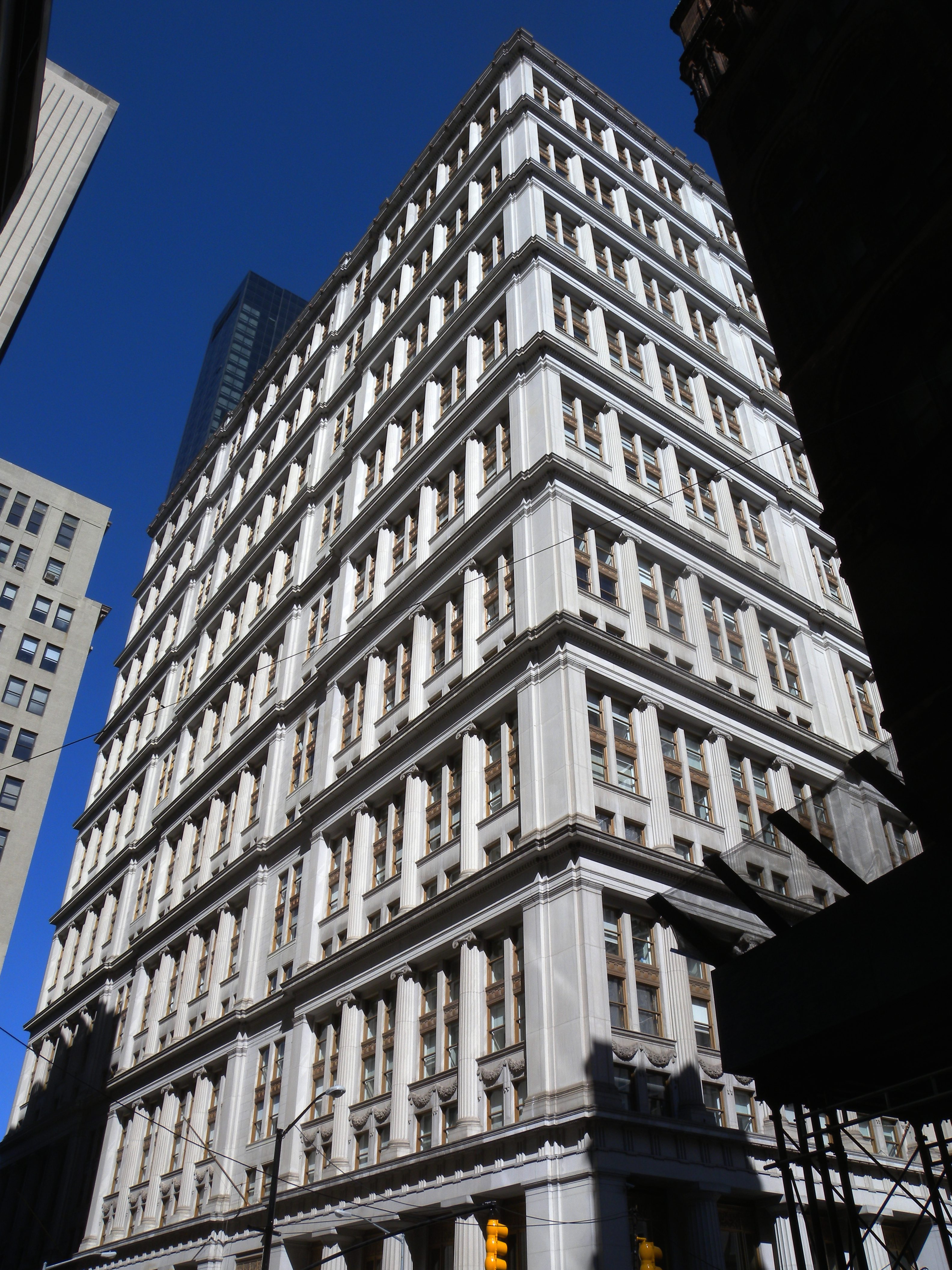
AT&T's previous headquarters at 195 Broadway

AT&T was established in 1885 and had been headquartered at 195 Broadway in Lower Manhattan since 1916. In the subsequent decades, AT&T became the world's largest telephone company, and maintenance costs on its headquarters increased. With its continued growth, AT&T acquired land for a new facility in Basking Ridge, New Jersey, in 1970, although the company denied that it was fleeing to the suburbs. John D. deButts, who became AT&T's CEO in 1972, also wished to construct a new Midtown headquarters as a monument to the company and to boost his own name recognition. The 195 Broadway headquarters had a capacity of only 2,000 workers, but AT&T had 5,800 headquarters workers by the mid-1970s, most of them in New Jersey.

=== Development ===
==== Site acquisition ====
AT&T began looking for a Midtown site in the early 1970s, hiring James D. Landauer Associates to assist with site selection. It wished to build a site near Grand Central Terminal but eschewed Park Avenue as being too prominent. The western blockfront of Madison Avenue between 56th and 57th Streets was being acquired by IBM, which refused to give up its lot to AT&T. On the block immediately to the south, Stanley Stahl had paid $12 million since 1970 for a lot of 23,000 square feet (2,100 m^{2}). On Stahl's block, AT&T acquired seven buildings in late 1974, followed by two adjacent buildings to the west in 1975, the latter of which were acquired in anticipation of AT&T being allowed to construct extra space. Stanley W. Smith, president of the 195 Broadway Corporation, paid Stahl $18 million for his assemblage in October 1975. The land value appreciated significantly in the following years; by 1982, Stahl's plot alone was worth $70 million.

To save time and limit inflation-related costs, AT&T awarded some construction contracts before certain design details were finalized. Demolition permits for the site had been approved by 1976, but, because of subsequent delays, a park or a temporary taxpayer building were considered for the site. The Alpine Wrecking Corporation was hired to dismantle the existing structures. The company removed non-load-bearing walls, salvaged recyclable materials, demolished the structures' upper stories by hand, and finally used machinery to destroy the lower stories. The two buildings nearest the Corning Glass Building were temporarily preserved to allow that building's fire code rating to be retained.

==== Planning and design ====
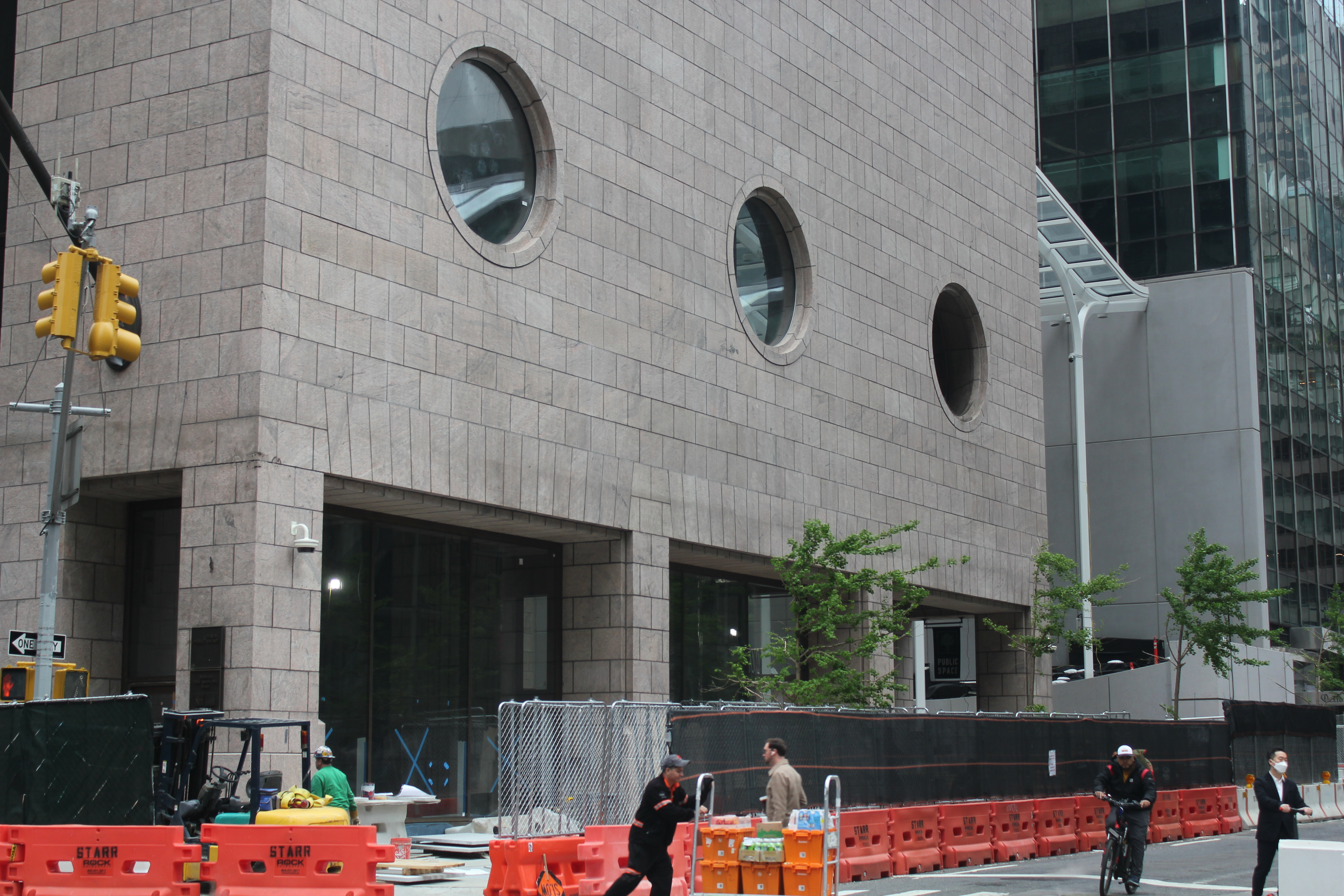
Bullseye windows on 56th Street

Around 1975 or 1977, a committee of three AT&T officials and three officials from Smith's offices mailed questionnaires to twenty-five architects or design firms which the executives deemed "highly qualified". Thirteen of the recipients responded. Johnson and Burgee recalled that they set aside the questionnaire until AT&T called them two weeks afterward; according to Burgee, they initially thought the questionnaire was for a completely different structure that they had previously designed in Chicago. Smith visited eight candidates and picked three finalists: Johnson/Burgee, Roche-Dinkeloo, and Hellmuth, Obata & Kassabaum. The three finalists were to give presentations to the committee and high-ranking officials. Johnson and Burgee did not prepare an elaborate presentation, instead presenting photographs of their past work. The partners brought along one picture each of the Seagram Building and Pennzoil Place, relying mainly on their expertise and wit to impress AT&T officials, who later recalled that "there was no close second" candidate. Smith subsequently stated that Johnson/Burgee had been open to different design ideas.

On June 17, 1977, the day after the presentations, The New York Times reported that AT&T had hired Johnson/Burgee to design a 37-story headquarters on the site. Johnson said he wanted the new headquarters to be a "landmark" representing the company. The Wall Street Journal reported shortly afterward that Johnson was conducting a feasibility study for the headquarters. AT&T mandated that Johnson/Burgee select an associate architect as per the provisions of the Equal Employment Opportunity Act of 1972. Harry Simmons Jr., head of a small African American firm, was selected out of seven interviewees from a field of 28 candidates. Simmons's firm was tasked with designing twenty percent of the overall architectural detail.

According to design manager Alan Ritchie, DeButts explained "what he wanted in broad terms" but gave wide latitude to the final design. DeButts wanted the structure's design to be at least as influential as that of the Seagram Building, without copying its design. Johnson and Burgee looked to various structures, such as early New York skyscrapers and the entries to the Tribune Tower design competition, for inspiration. Judith Grinberg created a 7-foot-tall (2.1 m) sketch of the AT&T Building's facade "to interpret [Johnson's] design intent"; the sketch was sold to London's Victoria and Albert Museum in 2010. In addition, Howard W. Swenson created numerous styrofoam models for the building and helped to refine the design details. The New York City Department of Buildings received blueprints for the new headquarters in January 1978. A Times editorial that month praised the AT&T project, as well as the neighboring IBM development at 590 Madison Avenue, as a "declaration of corporate commitment" to New York City, which had then recently rebounded from its fiscal crisis.

AT&T announced its official plans on March 30, 1978, at a conference outside New York City Hall. A rendering of the headquarters was shown on the front page of the next day's Times. The plans called for a 37-story granite tower with a rectangular massing, a lobby raised 60 feet (18 m) above the ground, and a public plaza beside it. Mayor Ed Koch described the project as "a strong vote of confidence" in the city's future, and the news media characterized it as part of a trend of midtown revitalization. AT&T initially expected to begin construction in late 1978 and complete the building by 1982 at an estimated cost of $60 million. (Note: According to The New Yorker, the initial projected cost was $110 million, though it is unclear when this cost estimate was made.) The design, particularly its pediment, received widespread media attention, prompting AT&T to reexamine the plans in detail before deciding to proceed without modifications. In late 1978, the project received several floors' worth of zoning "bonuses" and exemptions from setback regulations, in exchange for public space, a three-story communications museum, and a covered arcade on Madison Avenue. (Note: AT&T was granted permission to add 81,928 square feet (7,611.4 square metres), about four stories, in exchange for the open public space and communications museum. The company was given an additional 43,000 sq ft (4,000 m^{2}), or two stories, for creating a 14,000 sq ft (1,300 m^{2}) covered arcade along Madison Avenue with include seating and retail kiosks.) Johnson decided to use Stony Creek pink granite on the AT&T Building's facade.

==== Construction ====
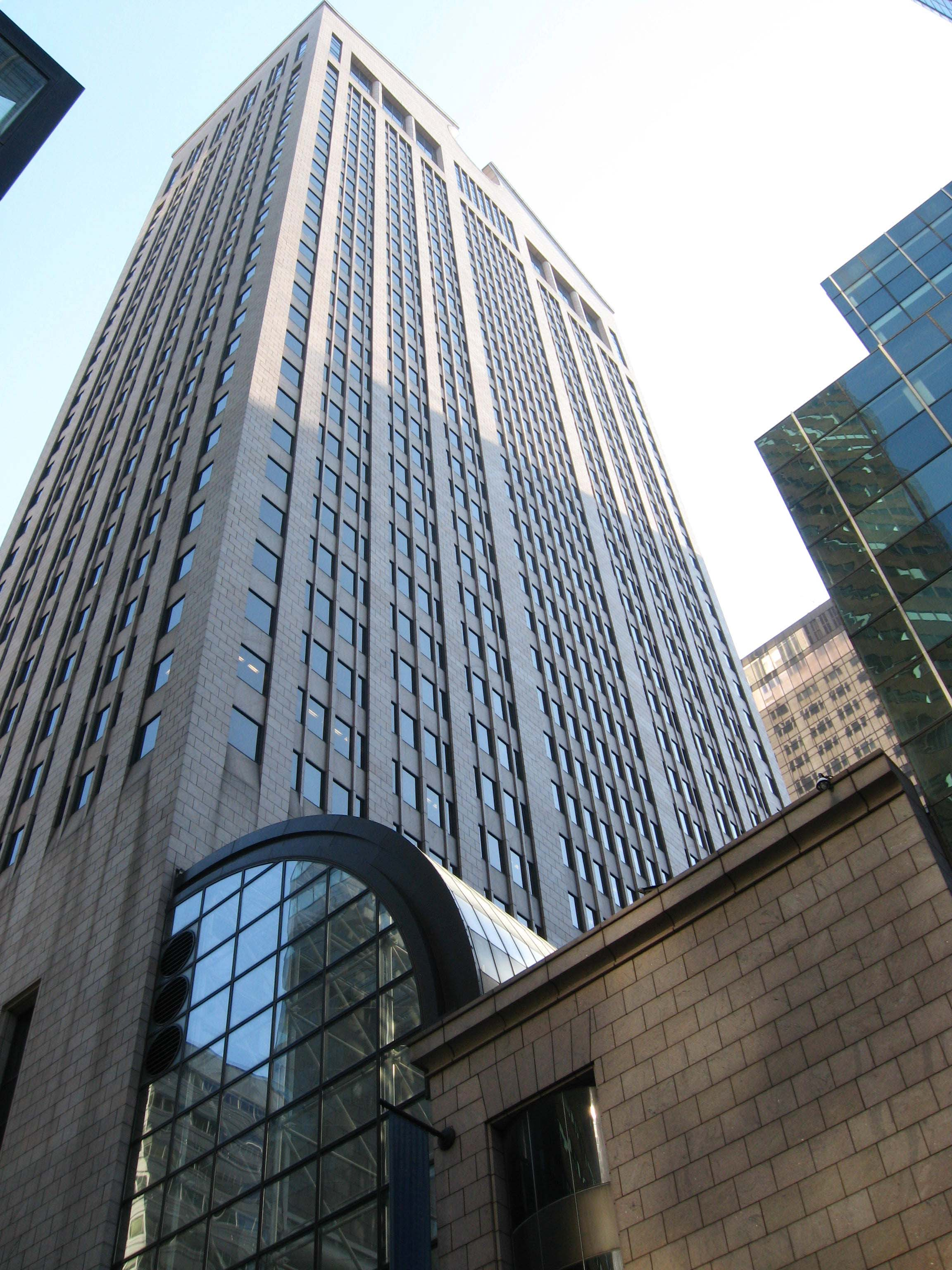
Western elevation of the facade before 2020s renovation

Construction started in December 1978 when workers started excavating foundations; the same month, AT&T received a $20 million tax abatement on the construction cost. The foundation excavation cost $3.1 million and largely consisted of blasting into the underlying bedrock. The detonations used about 50,000 pounds (23,000 kg) of Tovex gel. The underlying rock layer was made of mica schist, the composition of which was unpredictable if detonated, so about 8,000 small blasts were used to excavate the foundation. The resulting hole was 45 to 50 feet (14 to 15 m) deep. Excavations were ongoing in February 1979 when deButts was replaced by Charles L. Brown as AT&T CEO. Brown, who was less enthusiastic about a grand headquarters than deButts had been, sought a review of the project, but construction continued nonetheless. Faced with rising construction costs, the architects had to substitute cheaper materials; for example, granite in the elevator cabs was replaced with wood.

The construction of the superstructure commenced in March 1980. Before installing the steel beams, workers assembled the shear tubes at the building's core, along with the 50-ton granite columns that supported the base. Since the steelwork began above the sky lobby on top of the base, workers climbed through the shear tubes to complete the sky lobby before installed the steel crane. At the same time, the IBM Building was under construction on 56th Street, limiting access there. Shortly after work started, Local 282—the union whose workers were constructing the building—threatened to strike because of claims that black workers were "invading" job sites. This prompted IBM to hire two additional foremen. In December 1980, Paul Goldberger wrote for The New York Times that "the arch is beginning to take shape".

At its peak, the project's three foremen had to balance the requests of about "three dozen powerful prime contractors and 150 subcontractors and suppliers", according to Inc magazine. Workers from more than 70 trades were involved in the construction of the building. The cladding was attached to the steel frame starting in September 1981, several months behind schedule. The workings were so complex that even the facade cladding required the involvement of members of four construction unions. The building topped out on November 18, 1981. Contractors made some mistakes because of the accelerated construction schedule; for instance, electrical ducts had to be carved into the concrete floors after they were built. By late 1982, the work was one year late and $40 million over budget.

=== Completion and early years ===
Throughout nearly the entire development process, AT&T faced an antitrust lawsuit from the United States Department of Justice. The parties reached an agreement in January 1982, with AT&T consenting to divest its Bell System effective January 1, 1984. Shortly after this agreement, AT&T decided to lease out 300,000 sq ft (28,000 m^{2}) on the 7th through 25th floors, comprising nearly half of the building's space. AT&T wanted to rent out the space for as much as $60 per square foot ($650/m^{2}), but few companies were willing to sign a lease. The company had expected to move as many as 1,500 employees into 550 Madison Avenue, but the impending divestiture reduced that figure to 600. In early 1983, AT&T reneged on its rental proposal after city government officials warned company officials that the building's tax exemption could be canceled if AT&T were to receive rental income.

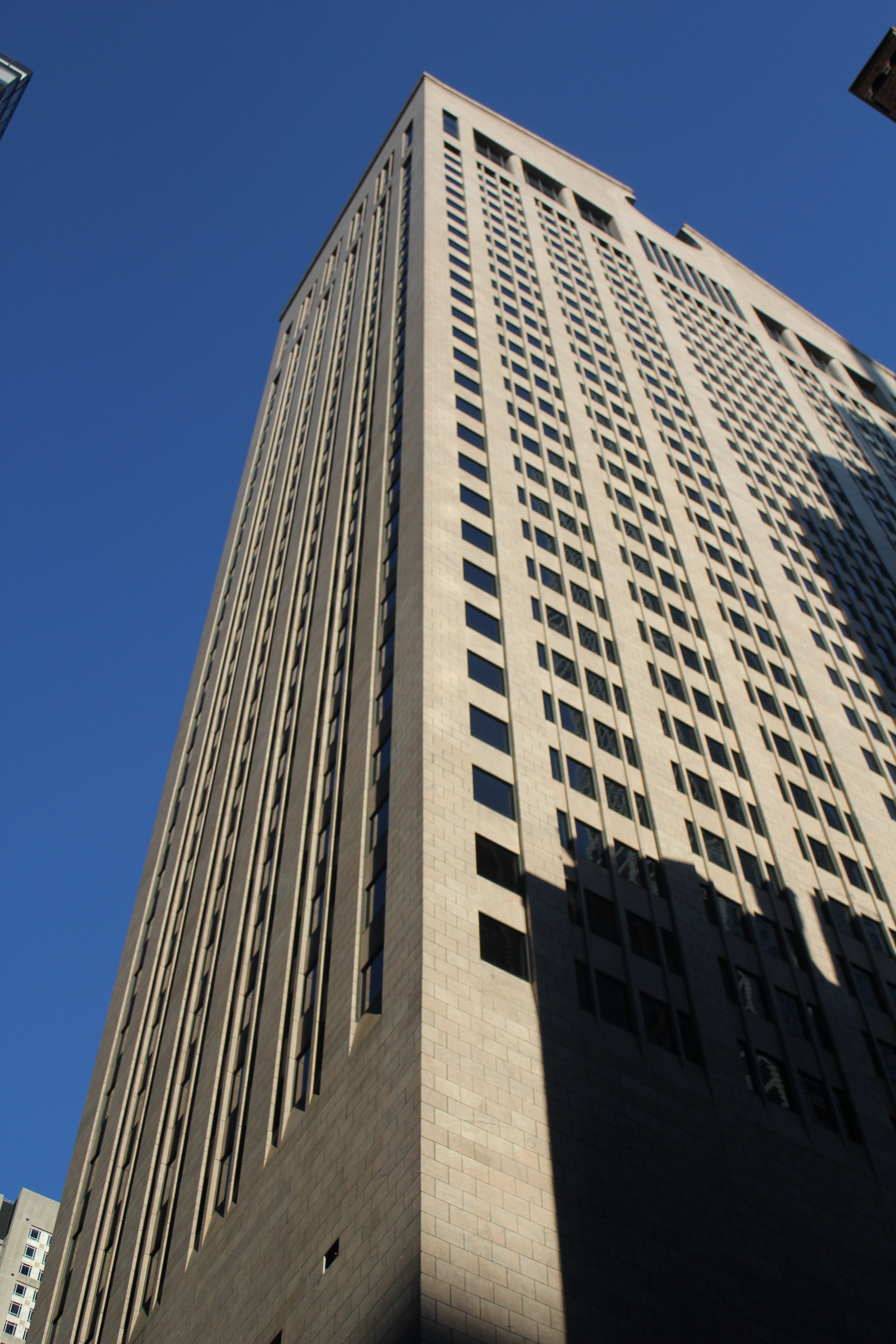
As seen from the corner of Madison Avenue and 55th Street

The first occupants moved to their offices on July 29, 1983, and the Spirit of Communication statue was dedicated two months later, with full occupancy expected by the time of the Bell System divestiture at the end of the year. Only three of the office stories were occupied by late 1983. By January 1984, about 1,200 employees had moved from 195 Broadway to 550 Madison Avenue. That month, AT&T's longtime advertising agency, N. W. Ayer & Son, displayed a large welcome message from its own offices nearby. New York magazine reported in February 1984 that the executive offices were not occupied and that full completion was not expected until that May. The building was completed sometime in 1984 but was overlooked by the media, which instead publicized the divestiture. It ultimately cost $200 million, a rate of about $200 per square foot ($2,200/m^{2}), although New York placed the cost as high as $220 million. Despite the high cost of construction, AT&T never fully occupied 550 Madison Avenue.

In early 1984, AT&T officials said that rather than constructing a museum in the annex for bonus zoning, they planned to use the annex for a showroom. The change of plan came after the Bell divestiture shrank AT&T's planned presence at the building. After the city firmly opposed the move, AT&T agreed to construct a three-story exhibition space within the annex. In exchange, AT&T was granted a $42 million, ten-year tax abatement that August. The museum, which was named Infoquest Center, opened in May 1986. That September, AT&T said it would move up to 1,000 of its 1,300 employees to Basking Ridge, and seek to rent out at least 600,000 square feet of 550 Madison Avenue. The company was reconsidering leasing out its Madison Avenue headquarters by early 1987. After Koch threatened to rescind the entire tax abatement, AT&T agreed to move only 778 employees. The fine-dining restaurant The Quilted Giraffe moved into the building in June 1987.

=== Sony ownership ===
Having substantially decreased in size, AT&T sought to rent 80 percent of the space at 550 Madison Avenue to other companies in January 1991. At the time, AT&T wanted to move most employees to a cheaper space. AT&T had signed a tentative 20-year lease with Sony by that May, although neither company confirmed the rumor at the time. Sony signed a 20-year lease agreement for the entire building that July, including an option to purchase 550 Madison Avenue. AT&T also forfeited $14.5 million of tax abatements to the city government, equivalent to the taxes forgiven since 1987. The refunded tax abatements were used to fund programs at the financially distressed City University of New York for the 1991–1992 academic year. AT&T moved its headquarters to 32 Avenue of the Americas, its long-distance telephone building in Lower Manhattan, and removed the Spirit of Communication statue. With the sale of the building, Burgee commented, "The period of making image buildings for companies appears to be over."

==== Renovation ====
After Sony leased the building, it became known as the Sony Tower. In early 1992, Gwathmey Siegel designed a renovation of the base, with Philip Johnson as consultant. The arcade space was to be converted into retail space; in exchange, the atrium was to be expanded with new planters and public seating. Edwin Schlossberg was hired to design the new storefronts and redesign the annex. Sony expected that 8,727 sq ft (810.8 m^{2}) of the arcade could be converted into stores at a rate of $200 per square foot ($2,200/m^{2}). According to Sony, the arcades were "dark, windy and noisy", and a conversion to commercial space would provide "retail continuity" with the remainder of Madison Avenue.

Johnson was not overly concerned about the closure of the arcade, saying, "It isn't that my ideas have changed. The period has changed." The plan did face some opposition: the original associate architect Harry Simmons Jr. said that a "valued and useful space" would be razed, while Joseph B. Rose of the local Manhattan Community Board 5 said it would create "a dangerous precedent" for converting public plazas to commercial space. Conversely, David W. Dunlap of The New York Times said the changes were "unquestionably an improvement" both aesthetically and functionally. The New York City Planning Commission had to review and approve the proposal. While the plans resulted in a net loss in public space, they also increased the overall zoning bonus. (Note: The building received 3 square feet of additional interior space for every square foot of arcade space, and it received 11 square feet of interior space for every square foot of midblock atrium space. About 10,560 square feet (981 m^{2}) was to be removed from the arcade, so 31,680 square feet (2,943 m^{2}) of interior bonus space was forfeited. About 4,106 square feet (381.5 m^{2}) was to be added to the midblock atrium, so 45,166 square feet (4,196.1 m^{2}) of interior bonus space was added.) The commission approved slightly modified plans in September 1992, which retained small portions of the arcade. Sony bought out the Quilted Giraffe's lease, and the restaurant closed at the end of 1992.

The Sony Tower was renovated between 1992 and 1994. Windows with bronze gridded frames were installed to close off the atrium, which became Sony stores, and the annex was converted into the Sony Wonder technology museum. The annex was completely gutted because, under guidelines set by the Americans with Disabilities Act of 1990, the existing ramps and passageways were too steep. Inside, Dorothea Rockburne was commissioned to paint two fresco murals for the formerly bare sky lobby, and additional staircases, conference centers, and offices were installed on the office stories. Barry Wine, founder of the Quilted Giraffe, was hired as the chef for the building's private dining club.

==== Use ====
The new atrium and retail spaces, known as Sony Plaza, were completed in 1994, and the Sony Wonder museum opened in the annex that May. The company name was prominently displayed in Sony Plaza: its logo was emblazoned on the jackets of the atrium's security guards, and banners with Sony's name were displayed. In its first year, the converted Sony retail space at ground level generated less profit than expected, prompting Sony Plaza Inc. to hire a new general manager in 1995. The atrium was criticized for being inhospitable to the homeless, as private security guards patrolled the space.

Sony leased four stories at 555 Madison Avenue immediately to the east in February 1995. By the following year, Sony was renovating its space within 555 Madison Avenue; the company installed fiber-optic cables under Madison Avenue to connect its two buildings, and it installed microwave communications equipment atop 555 Madison Avenue. Sony had consolidated most of the operations for its Sony Music Entertainment division at the Sony Tower on 550 Madison Avenue, for which The New York Times noted that "such high-profile and elaborate space is appropriate and necessary". This was part of a move to consolidate Sony's United States operations away from the Sony Corporation of America, which had overseen Sony Pictures and Sony Music, and give more control over the United States operations to executives in Japan. The Wall Street Journal described the equipment upgrades as indicative of "a long-term commitment to the area".

In 2002, Sony exercised its option to purchase the building from the cash-strapped AT&T for $236 million, or $315 per square foot ($3,390/m^{2})—a relatively low rate given the building's location in Midtown Manhattan. Two years later, Sony contemplated selling the building once its merger with Bertelsmann was completed. Part of the Sony Wonder museum was renovated in 2008 and reopened the following year. An accumulation of ice dislodged from an upper floor after a February 2010 blizzard, breaking the atrium's glass ceiling and injuring several inside.

=== Chetrit ownership ===
By 2012, Sony sought to sell off the Sony Tower, as the company perceived that the costs of keeping its American headquarters in Midtown were too high. Potential buyers started submitting bids for the Sony Tower in December 2012. Sony received over 20 bids, including from Joseph Sitt's Thor Equities, Mitsui Fudosan, and a partnership led by the Brunei Investment Agency. All of the bids proposed to convert at least part of the space to hotel or condominium use. In January 2013, Sony announced plans to sell the building to Joseph Chetrit's Chetrit Group for $1.1 billion, leasing back its offices there. Shortly afterward, Sony filed eviction proceedings against Joseph Allaham, a longtime tenant and Chetrit's friend, who operated a pizzeria and a restaurant in the base. Allaham ultimately decided to move his restaurant and retain his pizzeria.

The Chetrit Group planned to convert the Sony Tower into a hotel and condominium development; the hotel would be the first in the US operated by the Oetker Collection. Robert A. M. Stern Architects and SLCE Architects drew up plans for a 170-room hotel on the lowest eight floors and 113 apartments above, each with two to five bedrooms. In February 2015, the developers filed a condominium offering that called for 96 residences, which were to be sold at a combined total of $1.8 billion. The offering included what was then considered Manhattan's most expensive residence, a three-story penthouse in the upper stories costing $150 million. Dorothea Rockburne expressed concern that the developers would not adequately preserve two of her frescoes in the sky lobby, which was set to be converted into the hotel's lobby. Sony permanently closed the Sony Wonder Technology Lab in January 2016. Over the following months, Sony moved its headquarters and stores south to 11 Madison Avenue; this left the building mostly empty.

=== Olayan Group ownership ===
==== Sale and initial plans ====
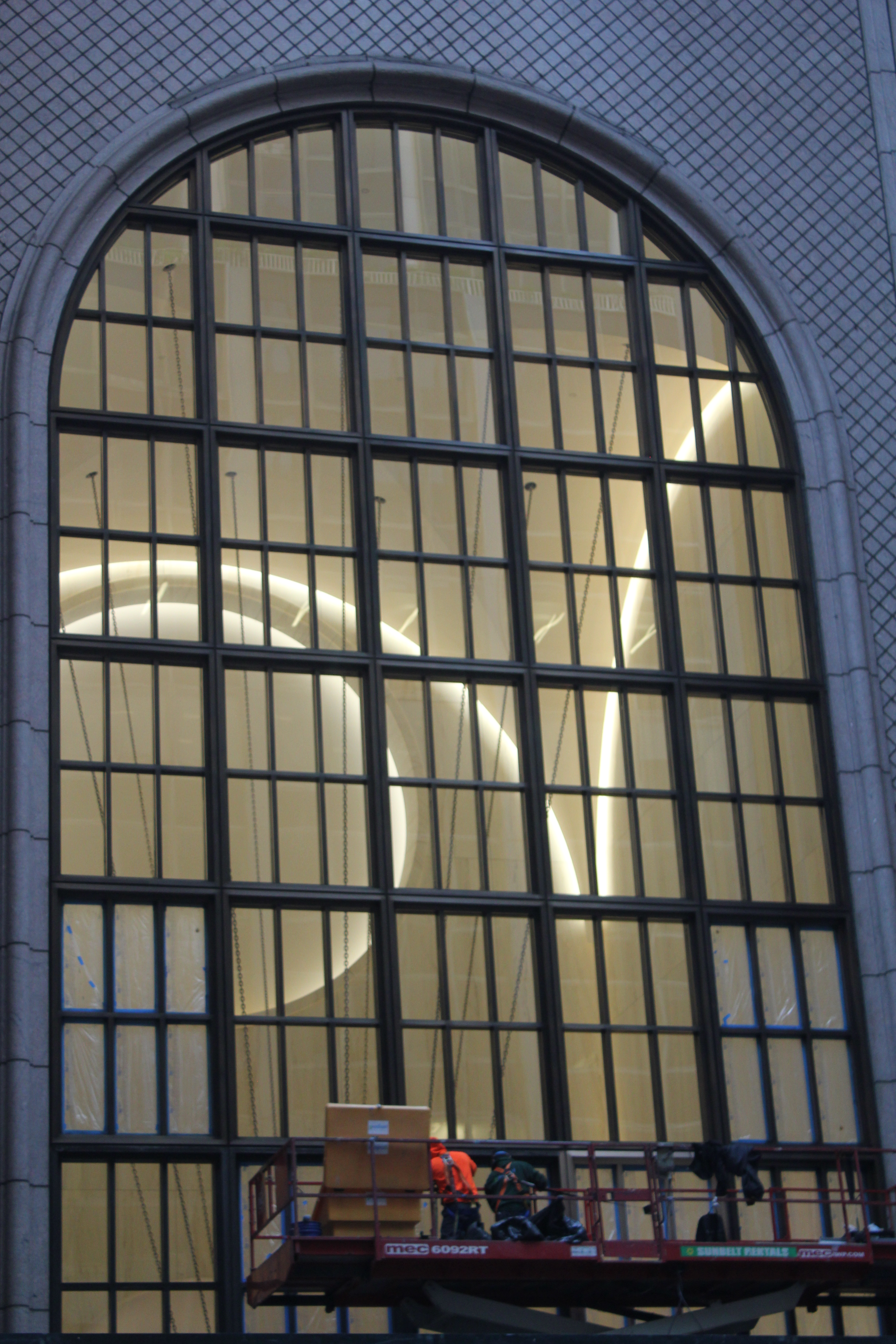
The main entrance as seen in 2021, during the building's renovation

Following a declining real estate market in the 2010s, the Chetrit Group abandoned its condominium conversion plan. Chetrit sold the building to The Olayan Group and the Chelsfield Group in April 2016 for $1.4 billion; the sale was finalized the next month. Olayan obtained majority ownership of the building, while Chelsfield was the minority owner. The owners announced plans to rebrand 550 Madison Avenue and reconfigure the existing space. A group of banks including ING Group, Bank of East Asia, Crédit Agricole, Société Générale, and Natixis provided $570 million in financing to facilitate the redevelopment. The final tenant, Allaham's pizzeria, closed in September 2017.

In late October 2017, Olayan announced plans to renovate the building with designs by Snøhetta, with AAI Architects, P.C. as architect of record. The firm planned to add a glass curtain wall along the base on Madison Avenue, exposing the structural steel. Snøhetta and AAI also planned to demolish the arcade and annex on the western end of the site, replacing it with a garden. The building was not, at the time, protected as a city landmark. Craig Edward Dykers, a cofounder of Snøhetta, said the despite his respect for the original Johnson and Burgee design, he thought the original "fortress-like" base contributed to a lack of "human sensitivity" and that the architecture was not supposed to be treated as a museum piece. The renovation, anticipated to cost $300 million, would allow the building's owner to raise rents to between $115 and $210 per square foot ($1,240 and $2,260/m^{2}), which would be among the city's highest office rent rates.

Architecture critics, architects, and artists voiced their opposition to the plans. Opponents circulated a petition and held a protest that November. Shortly afterward, the LPC voted to calendar the building for consideration as a landmark. Though there were efforts to preserve the interiors, the LPC determined that the lobby's design had changed significantly when Spirit of Communication was removed and the arcades were enclosed, making the space ineligible for interior landmark status. Demolition of the building's original ground floor lobby began in January 2018 and was completed within a month. On July 31, 2018, the LPC voted unanimously to designate the exterior as a New York City landmark; the commission stated that the building was among the "most important postmodernist buildings" worldwide. Filmmaker and cultural heritage activist Nathan Eddy, who petitioned to preserve the original status, described the designation as "an astonishing and marvelous victory".

==== Revised plans and redevelopment ====
After the landmark designation, a revised plan was prepared in December 2018. In the revised plan, the western end of the ground-floor lobby faced the atrium, and Rockburne's frescoes were to be mounted on the sky lobby. The plan preserved the stone base, albeit with changes to the windows. The LPC approved the updated plan in February 2019. Gensler was subsequently hired to take over the ground-floor lobby's renovation, announcing plans for the lobby in October 2019. The original plan to demolish the annex and atrium was also scrapped. In Snøhetta's updated plan, the atrium was to be planted with greenery and connected to 717 Fifth Avenue, and the atrium's roof and the annex were to be replaced. The New York City Planning Commission approved the modified design for the plaza in January 2020.

The Olayan Group's Head of Real Estate Erik Horvat said the renovation would help 550 Madison "compete against Hudson Yards, One Vanderbilt and the best buildings in the city". The new lobby was completed in October 2021, at which point 550 Madison Avenue was 45 percent leased. The Chubb Group leased ten floors the next month, becoming the first confirmed tenant within the renovated building. Other major tenants included luxury fashion retailer Hermès, which leased three stories, and private equity company Clayton, Dubilier & Rice, which leased five stories. The atrium opened in November 2022 with three food stalls. The entire renovation was completed in 2023.

==== Post-redevelopment ====
The renovated building, known alternatively as 550 Madison, could accommodate 2,000 employees, twice as many as before the renovation. The restaurateur Simon Kim signed a lease in January 2023 for three levels of restaurant space, covering 15,000 square feet (1,400 m^{2}); this became the Cote restaurant, which opened in 2026. By May 2025, nearly the entire building had been leased except for the 22nd and 34th floors. The Olayan Group refinanced 550 Madison Avenue in early 2026 with an $800 million loan, at which point it was 96% occupied.

== Impact ==
=== Reception ===
==== Contemporary commentary ====
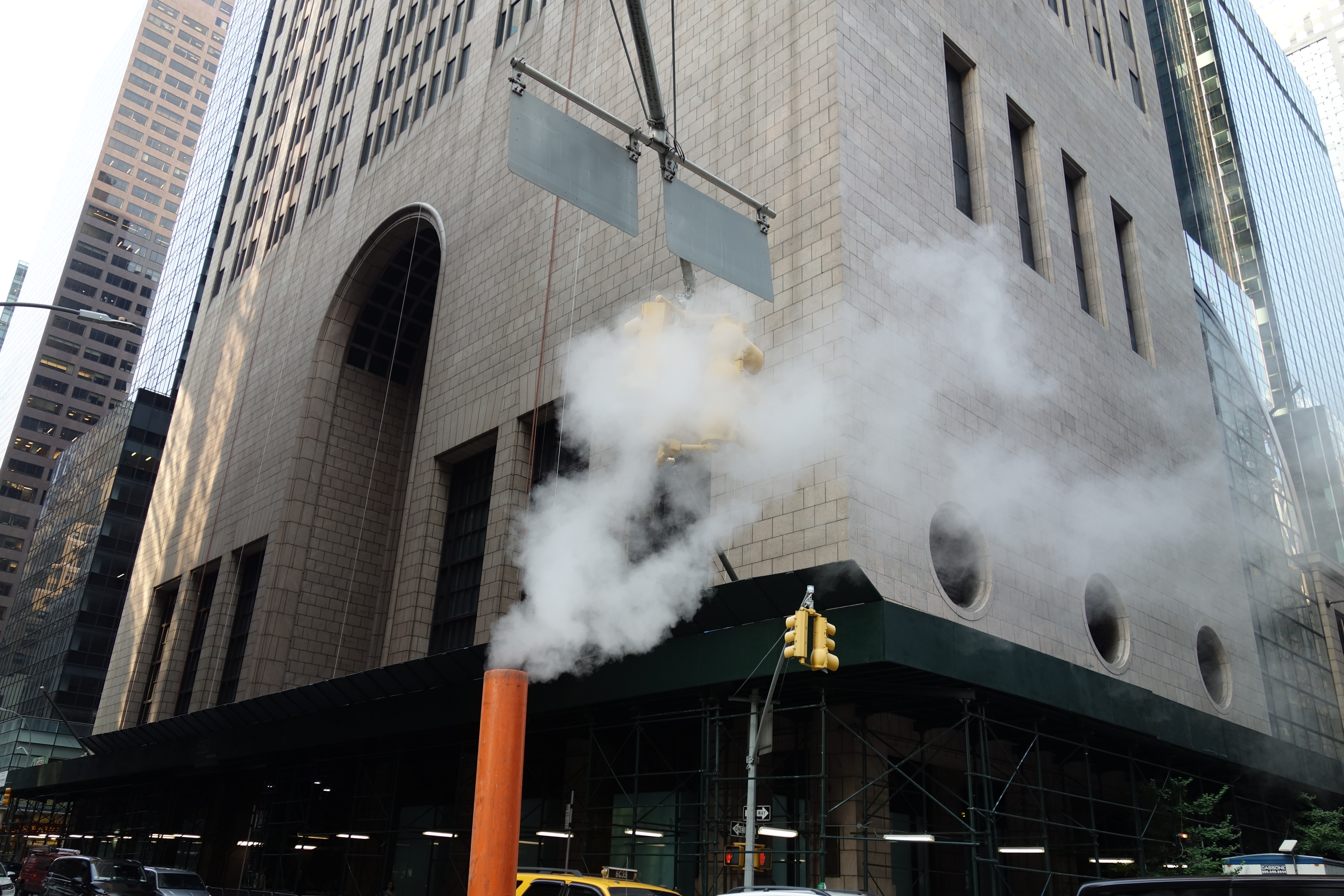
Steam funnel in front of 550 Madison Avenue

The AT&T Building received much publicity from architectural critics from the time plans were announced. Paul Goldberger called it "post-modernism's major monument" but felt that the broken pediment "suggests that a joke is being played with scale that, may not be quite so funny when the building [...] is complete". Ada Louise Huxtable described the design as "a monumental demonstration of quixotic aesthetic intelligence rather than art" and dubbed it 1978's "non-building of the year". Michael Sorkin of The Village Voice dismissively characterized the structure as a "Seagram Building with ears". Architects and members of the public wrote sardonic and disapproving letters about the design. Robert Hughes of Time magazine called it "peculiar rather than radical" but said it gave other designers permission "to build their own monuments of the hybrid" postmodernist style.

Much controversy surrounded the roof's broken pediment. Goldberger was the first person to publicly characterize the pediment as "Chippendale", after the British manufacturer's furniture, but said the term had been first used by Arthur Drexler of the Museum of Modern Art, who did not want to be associated with the nickname. The pediment gained more notice elsewhere. Chicago Tribune architecture critic Paul Gapp wrote that the pediment had "made instant history" and incited "a natural uproar", and the architect Edgar Tafel called it "Philip Johnson's foible". The Atlanta Constitution quoted various architects who said the design "couldn't possibly succeed" and was "a tragedy" if taken seriously. Conversely, The Baltimore Sun expressed optimism that the design would inspire similar structures in Downtown Baltimore. The cynical response to the initial plans led Johnson to publicly defend his plan in 1978, both in a New York Times op-ed and a speech for the American Institute of Architects. Der Scutt, architect of the neighboring Trump Tower, said in 1981 in response to criticism of 550 and 590 Madison Avenue: "I can't find anything oppressively hideous in IBM or AT&T. What is wrong with 'a showcase of superscale' in a city that prides itself as being culturally ecstatic about its skyscrapers?"

When 550 Madison Avenue was nearly finished, Goldberger re-appraised it as an important structure architecturally, though he said the completion "threatened to be something of an anticlimax". Ellen Posner of The Wall Street Journal said "It is not at all surprising that some of the original negative votes have been recast as positive". After the building was completed, it was received much more positively than during its construction. Susan Doubliet wrote for Progressive Architecture that the building was "more pleasure to passers-by than anyone would have predicted", but she also stated that "more was expected" of the disorganized design. Art historian Vincent Scully said 550 Madison Avenue "takes charge of the street" and that the pediment "has the effect of making us wonder why we ever allowed people to build skyscrapers with flat tops". Conversely, in a 1987 New York magazine poll of "more than 100 prominent New Yorkers", 550 Madison Avenue was one of the ten most disliked structures in New York City. Huxtable disliked the lobby, which she called "an oddly awkward and unsatisfactory space, distorted by its overreaching height and narrow dimensions".

==== Retrospective commentary ====
Sony's redesign of the building's atrium and arcades in the 1990s received mixed criticism. Some onlookers praised the openness of the atrium and retail spaces; one visitor interviewed by The New York Times likened the changes to a commercial sponsorship of the plaza, saying, "If Sony wants to maintain the space, they're using the commercials to pay for it." Others disapproved of the many references to Sony, including Ruth Messinger, Manhattan's borough president at the time, who perceived the atrium as "overly commercial". Progressive Architecture characterized the atrium as "not so bad" aesthetically but said that Sony's commercial amenities were not necessarily a sufficient tradeoff for public space.

Snøhetta's proposed renovation in the 2010s drew wide opposition from the architectural field. The architect Denise Scott Brown wrote that the proposal was "neo-modernist scalelessness", the architect Adam Nathaniel Furman regarded the new design as "bully architecture", and the historian Jayne Merkel said the glass base was not "distinctive or memorable" and did not relate to the upper facade. Goldberger regarded the glass base as making the building "top-heavy", saying that stripping the facade would go against the tenets of postmodernism, and the architectural critic Justin Davidson wrote: "Flaying the facade and exposing the steel skeleton would be an act of disdain, not homage." Johnson biographer Mark Lamster regarded the planned design as an unacceptable modification to what he saw as a New York City architectural icon. The critic Alexandra Lange said the proposed glass base was a fleeting design trend in the vein of an Apple Store. Burgee said he would prefer the building's demolition over the glass base, calling the granite a crucial part of the design. By contrast, the art professor Barry Bergdoll welcomed the redesign, saying it would "return some of the stolen public space" that had been lost in previous renovations.

After the 2020s renovation, Davidson wrote that "the link between structure and detail has been snapped. The original lobby and sky lobby are both gone and, with them, Johnson's sense of lugubrious grandeur." Davidson nonetheless praised the renovation as retaining the "building's essential mixture of flamboyance and solemnity". Architectural Record called the ground-floor lobby "a soaring corporate interior for the 21st century". Metropolis magazine said of the redesigned plaza: "Snøhetta has succeeded in doing something far greater than giving one historic building a refresh, providing a promising model for putting the public back into" privately owned public spaces. Robert A. M. Stern and the coauthors of his book New York 2020 wrote in 2025 that the renovation had been Madison Avenue's "most controversial renovation" in the early 21st century, given the building's status as a then-unofficial landmark.

=== Architectural significance ===
With ornamental additions such as the pediment and ground-level arch, the building challenged architectural modernism's demand for stark functionalism and purely efficient design. Wolf Von Eckardt wrote for The Washington Post in 1978, "I believe Johnson may well unite contemporary architecture again and lead it out of both the glass box and the concrete sculpture to a new ecumenic gentility." Similarly, the critic Reyner Banham thought the building had the potential to reshape architecture in New York City and in the postmodern era. The writer Franz Schulze said that the building had been so controversial because it differed from the "Miesian slabs" (namely, rectangular glass towers) popularized by Ludwig Mies van der Rohe in American cities.

Despite the building's mixed reception, the design helped bring publicity to Johnson's architectural practice. Johnson described the building as "a symbolic shift from the flat top" of International Style skyscrapers like the nearby Lever House. In a conversation with LPC researchers, Burgee said he received numerous letters from younger architects who expressed their gratitude that "the previous rules no longer apply". The design also influenced some of Johnson and Burgee's other works during the 1980s. Schulze described 550 Madison Avenue as marking the start of the postmodern phase of Johnson's career. After 550 Madison Avenue was finished, Johnson went on to design structures such as PPG Place in Pittsburgh and the Transco Tower in Houston, and he designed a tombstone for the historian Alfred H. Barr Jr., whose top resembled that of the AT&T Building.

For his design of the AT&T Building, Johnson received the Bronze Medallion from the city government in 1978. Johnson also received the 1978 Gold Medal from the American Institute of Architects, and he was the first architect to receive a Pritzker Architecture Prize in 1979.

== See also ==
- List of New York City Designated Landmarks in Manhattan from 14th to 59th Streets
- List of tallest buildings in New York City
- List of works by Philip Johnson
- Franklin Center (Chicago) – Formerly the AT&T Corporate Center
- Sony Building (Tokyo) – Building in Tokyo, property of Sony
