= Thatcher Wine =

American author

- Born: June 1972 (age 54); New York, United States
- Education: Dartmouth College (AB)
- Occupations: Author, Entrepreneur, Public Speaker
- Relatives: Barry Wine (father)
- Website: thatcherwine.com

Thatcher Wine is an American self-improvement author, book curator, bibliophile, and founder of Juniper Books. He is mostly known for designing and creating visually appealing curated book libraries. The Guardian and Town & Country have referred Wine as a "celebrity bibliophile".

== Biography ==
Thatcher Wine was born to Barry and Susan Wine. His parents were notable restaurateurs and were known for their restaurant The Quilted Giraffe.

Wine started his career with Monitor Company and was involved in various Internet startups in the 1990s. In 1999, he launched his own online customer service company Feedback Direct. After the company closed, he started buying books from estate sales and selling them on eBay.

In 2001, he established his bookselling enterprise as Juniper Books, named out of respect for the longevity of juniper trees, which can live for 500–1,000 years. Thatcher acknowledged Johannes Gutenberg and the history of the printed book going back over 500 years in his Ted Talk The Books We Keep, The Stories We Tell. Wine is CEO of Juniper Books and Juniper Custom and lives near the company's headquarters in Boulder, Colorado.

In the early 2000s, Wine established a business for helping clients curate and decorate their home libraries. Celebrities and interior designers commissioned Wine to fill their shelves including Gwyneth Paltrow, Shonda Rhimes and Philippe Starck. From 2010 onwards, Wine started to design custom book jackets and secured a US patent "dynamic application of a design across multiple product packages” for his invention of printing an image across multiple book spines.

Wine co-authored his first book Love of Books: Designing and Curating a Home Library in 2019. The book is about curating and designing private libraries and it was published by Gibbs Smith. In 2021, Wine's second book The Twelve Monotasks, was published by Little, Brown Spark, an imprint of Little, Brown and Company. The Twelve Monotasks grew out of Wine's experience as an entrepreneur, parent, and cancer survivor (Non-Hodgkin lymphoma). Of the book, Dr. David Perlmutter commented “Thatcher Wine gifts us with the tools to rein in our distractibility, allowing us to more richly participate in all that we do.”

== Books authored ==
- Wine, Thatcher (2019). For the Love of Books: Designing and Curating a Home Library. United Kingdom: Gibbs M. Smith Inc. ISBN 978-1423652151.
- The Twelve Monotasks: Do One Thing At A Time To Do Everything Better. Yellow Kite. 2022. ISBN 978-0316705547.
