= Loren Falsone =

Chef and restaurant owner from the United States

Loren Falsone is a chef and restaurant owner.

== Early life ==
Falsone was born in 1970 in East Setauket, New York and grew up in the Long Island suburbs and studied at Johnson & Wales University where she met future partner and husband, pastry chef Eric Moshier.

After being named a top ten sous chefs by Bertolli Olive Oil, she and her husband Eric Moshier moved to Florida and became Seasons 52’s executive chef.

== Career ==
Since February 2012, Falsone has owned the Windermere, Florida restaurant The Pharmacy with Dominick Tardugno; Falsone credits her eight years working at Al Forno in Rhode Island with Johanne Killeen and George Germon with teaching her much of what she knows.

Falsone has also been an instructor at the Orlando campus of Le Cordon Bleu. Tyler Brassil, her husband and co-owner at The Table - an Orlando Supper Club, also taught with her.

== Honors and awards ==
Food & Wine named her, in 2000, one of the Best New Chefs. Eric Moshier, with whom she worked at Al Forno and later opened Empire Restaurant in Providence, Rhode Island.
