= Meddeb =

Meddeb is a French surname. Notable people with the surname include:

- Abdelwahab Meddeb (1946–2014), French–Tunisian writer, critic and academic
- Hamdi Meddeb (born 1952), Tunisian
- Hind Meddeb (born 1978), French–Tunisian film producer and journalist
- Mohamed Meddeb (born 1981), Tunisian shot putter
- Moncef Meddeb (died 2019), American chef
- Rached Meddeb (born 1940), Tunisian footballer
