= Al Forno =

Coordinates: 41.8173°N 71.4006°W

- Interactive map of Al Forno

Restaurant information
- Established: 1980; 46 years ago
- Location: 577 South Water Street, Providence, Rhode Island, United States
- Website: alforno.com

Al Forno is an Italian restaurant in Providence, Rhode Island, founded by husband and wife Johanne Killeen and George Germon in 1980. They call their food "Cucina Simpatica: Robust Trattoria Cooking".

== Background ==
Killeen and Germon were artists looking for a way to supplement their income when they opened the restaurant. They are known as the birthplace of grilled pizza.

The couple won a James Beard Foundation Award in 1993 for being the best chefs in the Northeast, and Al Forno was named the best casual restaurant in the world in 1994 by the International Herald Tribune.

Their apple tart was featured on The Best Thing I Ever Ate television show. Germon died in 2015.

== Legacy ==
Alumni of their kitchen include Ken Oringer, Loren Falsone, Eric Moshier, and Cassie Piuma.
