= L'Espalier =

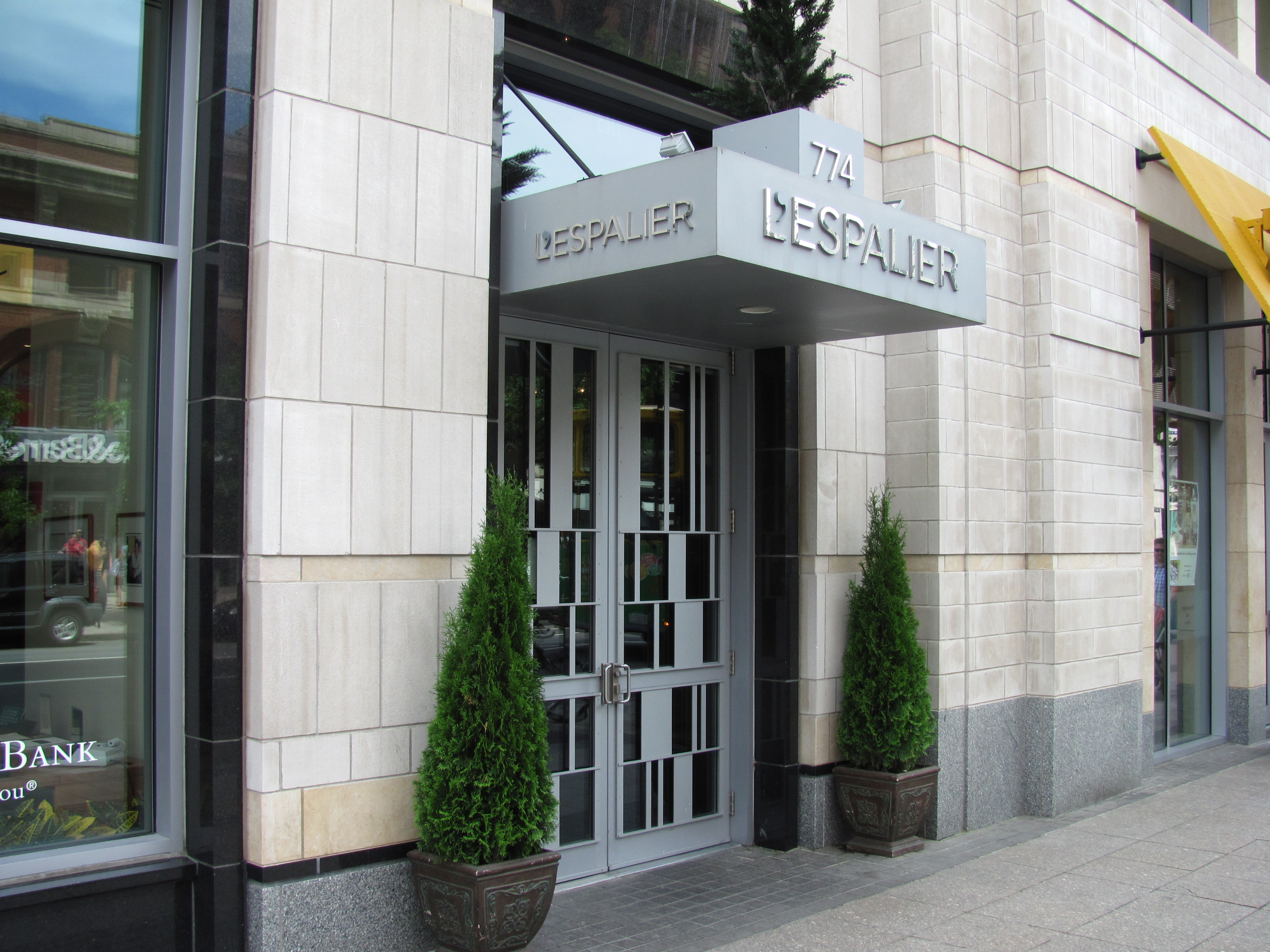
- L'Espalier
- Interactive map of L'Espalier

Restaurant information
- Established: 1978 by Moncef Meddeb
- Owner: Frank McClelland
- Head chef: Frank McClelland
- Food type: Modern New England with French influences and local ingredients
- Dress code: Jacket and tie most comfortable, but not required
- Location: 774 Boylston Street, Boston, Massachusetts, 02199, United States
- Coordinates: 42°20′54″N 71°04′51″W
- Seating capacity: 90+
- Reservations: Reservations suggested
- Other information: Phone: 617 262 3023
- Website: www.lespalier.com

L’Espalier was a French restaurant located in Boston, Massachusetts, in the Back Bay neighborhood, adjacent to the Mandarin Oriental Hotel. The chef and owner of L'Espalier was Frank McClelland, who received a James Beard Foundation Award in 2007 for Best Northeast Chef.

== History ==
Chef Moncef Meddeb opened L'Espalier on Boylston Street between Arlington and Berkeley in 1978. It moved to an 1880s-era brick townhouse on Gloucester Street in 1982 and was purchased by McClelland in 1988. The restaurant moved again into the Mandarin Oriental complex in 2008. It was designed by Martin Vahtra of Projects Design in New York. L'Espalier is known locally as a popular place for marriage proposals and celebrity sightings.

On March 27, 2013 McClelland celebrated their 35th anniversary with a specially designed six course tasting menu including Jonah crab bisque, branzino and rack of lamb.

L'Espalier closed permanently upon the expiration of its lease on December 31, 2018.

== Food ==
L'Espalier served locally grown produce prepared in classically French ways, offering lunch in the afternoon and dinner nightly with tea service on the weekends 1:30 to 3:00 p.m. Patrons could choose from three prix-fixe menu, the seasonal degustation (tasting) menu or the Chef's tasting journey. First courses included almond-dusted veal sweetbreads with morels and wilted baby mustard greens, with main course options such as pan-roasted East Coast halibut and Vermont rabbit.

== Staff ==
- Frank McClelland: Chef/Proprietor
- Logan Foos: Chef de Cuisine
- Louis Risoli: Maitre d’ & Fromager

== Awards and accolades ==
- AAA Five-Diamond Award recipient: 2018, 2017, 2016, 2015, 2014, 2013, 2012, 2011, 2010, 2009, 2008, 2007, 2006, 2005, 2004, 2003, 2002, 2001, 2000
- Mobil Four-Star Award recipient: 2018, 2017, 2016, 2015, 2014, 2013, 2012, 2011, 2010, 2009, 2008, 2007, 2006, 2005, 2004, 2003, 2002, 2001, 2000, 1999, 1998
- Zagat Survey of Boston Restaurants, "#1 Food" Rating:2015, 2006, 2005, 2004, 2003, 2002, 2001, 2000, 1999, 1998
- DiRoNa Award recipient: 2005, 2004, 2003, 2002, 2001, 2000, 1999, 1998

== See also ==
- List of French restaurants
