= Maria Hines =

American chef

- Education: Mesa College
- Culinary career
- Current restaurant(s): Tilth
- Previous restaurant(s): Agrodolce, Golden Beetle
- Television show(s): Top Chef Masters (season 2)
- Award(s) won: 2009 James Beard Foundation Award, Best Chef: Northwest

Maria Hines is a Seattle restaurateur and James Beard Award-winning chef. She's also the co-author of the cook book Peak Nutrition: Smart Fuel for Outdoor Adventure.

== Early life and career ==
Hines was raised in Bowling Green, Ohio and San Diego, California, and she earned a degree in culinary arts from Mesa College. She worked in kitchens across the country and in Europe before becoming executive chef at Earth & Ocean in the W Hotel in Seattle.

== Restaurants ==
In 2005, she was named one of the “Top Ten Best New Chefs in America” by Food & Wine magazine, and she decided to open her own restaurant. The restaurant was named Tilth, and it opened in Wallingford in 2006. Hines worked with Nora Pouillon and Oregon Tilth to have the restaurant certified organic. In 2008, the New York Times recognized Tilth as one of the ten best new restaurants in the country. In 2009, Hines won the James Beard Award for Best Chef: Northwest.

Hines opened two more restaurants: the Golden Beetle in 2011, and Agrodolce in 2012, both certified organic. The Golden Beetle was not financially successful and closed in 2016. In March 2019, Hines announced that she would sell Agrodolce to her executive chef, focusing her efforts on Tilth and on writing a cookbook and developing retail products.

Tilth closed in October 2020 due to the COVID pandemic.

== Television ==
In 2010, Hines won an episode of Iron Chef America, defeating Masaharu Morimoto in a battle of Pacific cod She also competed on an episode of Top Chef Masters, and she appeared on Martha with Martha Stewart.

== Activism ==
Hines was a founder of Seattle restaurant week and is known as a pioneer of organic and Pacific Northwest cuisine. She was a notable proponent of Washington Initiative 522 which would have required labeling of genetically modified food.
