= Ana Sortun =

Boston restaurateur

Oleana “Ana” Sortun is a chef, restaurateur and author in the Boston area.

== Biography ==
Sortun was born in Seattle.

After she graduated from La Varenne Ecole de Cuisine de Paris, she came to Massachusetts to open Moncef Meddeb’s Argo Bistro followed by stints, in the early 1990s, at 8 Holyoke and Casablanca, both in Harvard Square. Her restaurant Oleana opened in 2001.

Her husband, Chris Kurth, owns Siena Farms, in Sudbury, Massachusetts, where they live. The farm is named for their daughter and supplies produce for Oleana.

=== Restaurants ===
In addition to Oleana, she opened Sofra Bakery with a partner Maura Kilpatrick in 2008. Sofra has both a retail store and an "informal Middle Eastern café."

In 2013, she partnered with Chef de Cuisine Cassie Piuma to open a meyhane, Sarma, in Somerville, Massachusetts.

== Honors and awards ==
Sortun received the 2005 James Beard Award for Best Chef in the Northeast.

== Publications ==
- SPICE: Flavors of the Eastern Mediterranean 2006
- Soframiz: Vibrant Middle Eastern Recipes from Sofra Bakery

== TV appearances ==
- Top Chef Masters (season 2)
