= Carmen González (chef) =

Puerto Rican chef

González, Carmen
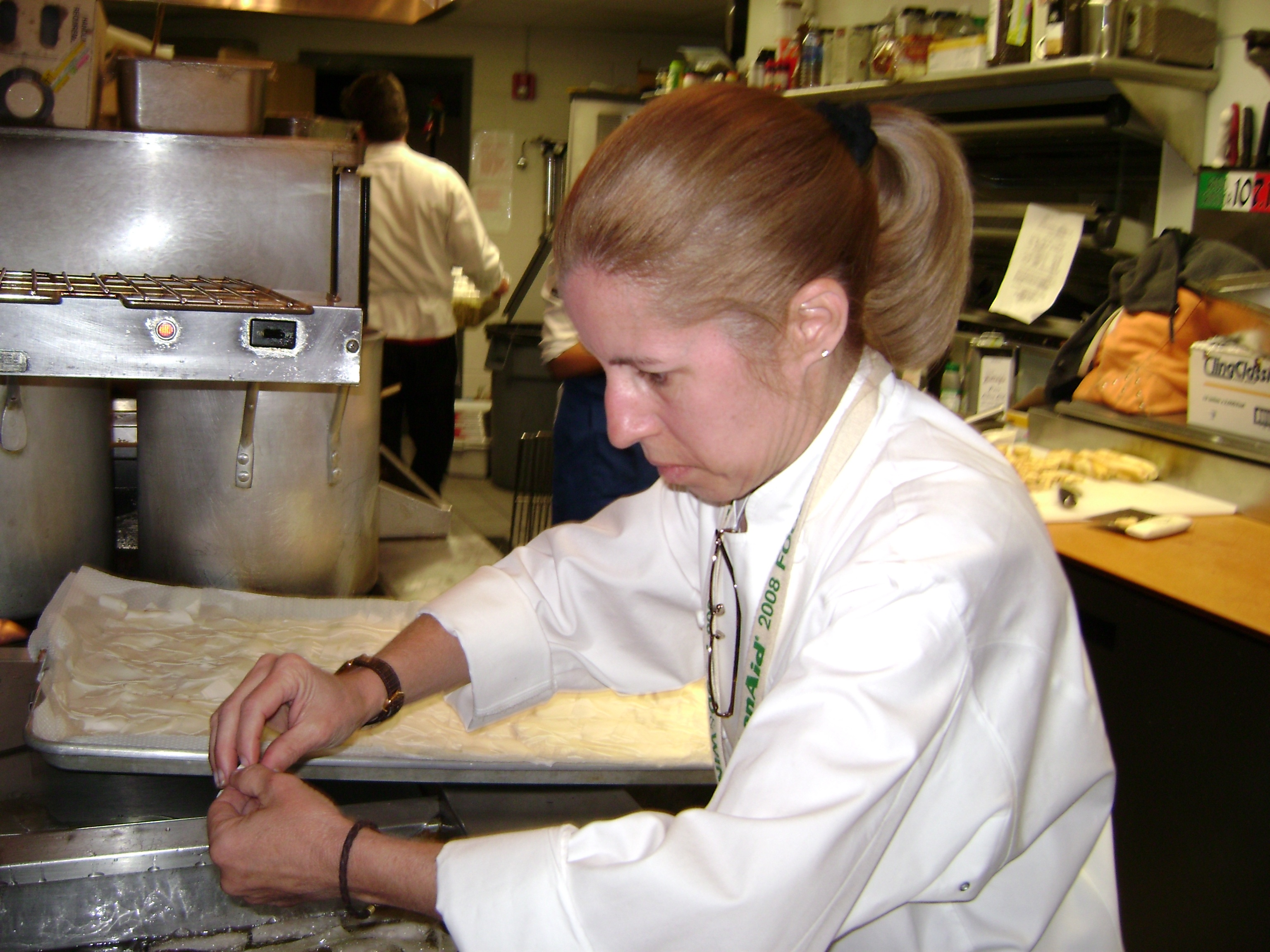
- Carmen González in June 2008
- Born: Aguadilla, Puerto Rico
- Occupation: Chef

Carmen González is a professional chef, restaurateur, and media personality.

González grew up in the Puerto Rican coastal town of Aguadilla before moving on to the New York Restaurant School to pursue a culinary career. She then trained under Chef Barry Wine at The Quilted Giraffe in New York City before opening her own restaurant, Carmen the Restaurant in Coral Gables, Florida.

== Top Chef Masters ==
In the second season of Top Chef Masters (March 2010), González competed against 21 other renowned and established chefs for the coveted title of "Top Chef Master" and a prize to the charity of their choice. In the season premiere, Chef Carmen found herself in a situation that almost forced her to forfeit the competition. However, Chef Carmen managed to improvise on the bad luck and ended up earning the top score, qualifying for the Finals Round. Chef Carmen's charity of choice is the ASPCA

== Restaurants ==
- Carmen the Restaurant, Coral Gables, Florida.
- Carmen at the Danforth, Portland, Maine

== Accolades ==
- April 30 The Miami Dade Count Office of the Mayor: Chef Carmen's Day
- 2008 Boys Town Club: NY Tenacious Women Award
- 2004 Rising Star: Star Chefs
- 2003 Ocean Drive: 8 Best Chefs
- 1999 The House of Representatives: Washington DC: Unsung Heroines of Florida
- 1996
  - Florida Governor Lawton Chiles: Florida Finest Award
  - National Coalition of Hispanic American Women: Woman of the Year 1996
- 1995 South Florida Magazine: Up and Comers of South Florida Award

== Carmen the Restaurant Reviews ==
- "America's Top Restaurants" book, 2004, 2005, 2006 Zagat
- "Four Diamond Award, 2004, 2005, 2006" AAA
- "One of the 50 Best Hispanic Restaurants 2004, 2005, 2006" Hispanic Magazine
- "Award of Excellence 2004, 2005, 2006" Wine Spectator
- "Best Puerto Rican Food 2005" Miami New Times
- "Best Hamburger 2005" Miami New Times
- "Best New Restaurant 2004" Miami New Times
- "One of the Best New Restaurants in America 2003" Esquire Magazine
- "State's "Best New Restaurants" Florida Trend
