= Barry Wine =

Restaurant consultant

Barry Wine is a former restaurateur and current restaurant consultant. Wine's restaurant The Quilted Giraffe, founded with then-wife Susan, was one of the most lauded eateries in the United States for its time. The Quilted Giraffe was first opened in New Paltz, New York, in 1975 and moved to 50th Street in Manhattan, New York City, in 1979. The Quilted Giraffe reopened in 550 Madison Avenue (then the AT&T building) at 55th Street and Madison Avenue in 1987. The restaurant was closed at the end of 1992 when Sony purchased the building and bought out the Wines' lease.

Wine married Elizabeth Wadsworth in 2000. In the second stage of his restaurant career Wine became a consultant. He was hired in 2006 by Tishman Speyer, which managed Rockefeller Center, to handle the transition of the Rainbow Room restaurant at 30 Rockefeller Plaza, which had been previously run by the Cipriani firm. Wine's son is Thatcher Wine, a book curator.
