= Moncef Meddeb =

American chef (died 2019)

Moncef Meddeb (died March 26, 2019) was an American chef and founder of L'Espalier Boston's first Le Cordon Bleu restaurant.

== Biography ==
Meddeb, the son of Tunisian immigrants, grew up in Paris. He emigrated to the United States in the late 1960s. He met Suzanne Owen, a Peace Corps volunteer, while he was in Tunis and working in a bank. They married and moved in with her father in Connecticut. He attended the University of Connecticut before transferring to Harvard College and graduating with a political science degree. His first cooking job was when he was at Harvard, working at the Harvard Square restaurant Casablanca. Another source says his first job was at the adjacent Algiers Cafe as a dishwasher. He later worked as the Main Chef at 7 Central in Manchester by the Sea. He opened L'Espalier in 1978 selling it to Frank McClelland in 1988. He opened the Sandrines restaurant 8 Holyoke in Cambridge and Aigo Bistro in Concord, Massachusetts where he hired Ana Sortun.

== Awards and honors ==
^Who’s Who of Food & Beverage in America, James Beard Foundation 1985
