= The Quilted Giraffe =

Restaurant in New York (open 1975 - 1992)

Coordinates: 40°45′40.5″N 73°58′24.5″W

The Quilted Giraffe was a nouvelle cuisine fine dining establishment in Midtown Manhattan in New York City. The restaurant, founded by Barry Wine and his now ex-wife Susan, was first opened in New Paltz, New York, in 1975 and moved to 50th Street in Manhattan, New York City, in 1979. The Quilted Giraffe reopened in 550 Madison Avenue (then the AT&T Building) at 55th Street and Madison Avenue in 1987. The restaurant closed at the end of 1992 when Sony purchased the building and bought out the Wines' lease. The restaurant was designed by Woodson Rainey, AIA, of McDonough Rainey Architects.

Regulars at the establishment included Warren Beatty, Woody Allen, Adnan Khashoggi, Ivan Boesky, Michael Milken, and John DeLorean and Cristina Ferrare.

The restaurant was awarded four stars by New York Times food critic Marion Burros in 1984 and two additional times by New York Times food critic Bryan Miller.

Among the chefs who worked under Wine at the restaurant and then went on to notable careers are Jan Birnbaum, Carmen González, David Kinch and Tom Colicchio.
