= Johanne Killeen =

American chef, restaurant owner and cookbook author

Johanne Killeen is an American chef, restaurant owner and cookbook author. Together with her husband, the late George Germon, she founded Al Forno Restaurant in Providence, Rhode Island, which is considered the birthplace of flatbread pizza. She is also the author of two cookbooks: Cucina Simpatica: Robust Trattoria Cooking from Al Forno (1991) and On Top of Spaghetti... Macaroni, Linguine, Penne, and Pasta of Every Kind.

Killeen and Germon were both artists, graduates of the Rhode Island School of Design RISD), and looking for a way to supplement their income which led them to open Al Forno in 1980. At the time they came up with the idea, Killeen had been working at a restaurant outside Florence, Italy while George taught at RISD in Rome.

She and her husband appeared on an episode of In Julia's Kitchen with Master Chefs, where they prepared dirty steak with hot Fanny sauce.

== Honors and awards ==
Food & Wine instituted an annual Best New Chef honor in 1988. Killeen Was in the first group and was the only woman in the group chosen. Along with her husband, she won the Best Chef of the Northeast James Beard Award. In 2018, she was a semifinalist for the Outstanding Chef award.
