= Frank McClelland =

Chef and restaurateur

- Born: New Hampshire, U.S.
- Culinary career
- Cooking style: French cuisine
- Current restaurant(s): L'Espalier; Sel de la Terre; Riversbend; La Brasa; Frank
- Award(s) won: James Beard Award (Best Northeast Chef, 2007); AAA Five Diamond Award (17 consecutive years)

Frank McClelland is a chef and restaurateur in the Boston area who received a James Beard Foundation Award in 2007 for Best Northeast Chef.

== Culinary career ==
In 1988, McClelland bought L'Espalier, a fine dining French restaurant in the Back Bay, from Moncef Meddeb (chef) before closing it in 2018. His second restaurant was Sel de la Terre on State Street. In 2016 he opened the Essex, Massachusetts restaurant Riverbend.

While at L’Espalier, he was the founder and CEO of New France which was a holding company for his restaurants.

Along with Daniel Bojorquez with whom he had worked at L’Espalier and Sel de la Terre, he opened La Brasa in Somerville.

The eponymous Frank opened in 2019 in Beverly, Massachusetts.

=== Awards and honors ===
He is the only one in Boston to have earned seventeen consecutive Five Diamond Awards from AAA while at L’Espalier. In 1986, Food & Wine named him of the top 25 new chefs in the US to watch.

== Personal life ==
He grew up in New Hampshire on his grandparents’ farm and has lived in Essex, Massachusetts for more than forty years.
