= Charles L. Brown =

American businessman (1921–2003)

Charles Lee Brown (August 23, 1921 – November 12, 2003) was an American businessman.

== Life and career ==
Charles L. Brown was born on August 23, 1921, in Richmond. His father was a traffic manager, and his mother was a phone operator for AT&T. He studied electrical engineering at the University of Virginia and graduated with a degree in 1943. For a brief time, he served in the U.S. Navy during World War II. Brown married Ann Lee Saunders Brown in 1959.

Brown joined AT&T in 1946. Before becoming president of AT&T in 1977, he served as executive vice president from 1974 and as CEO of Illinois Bell. Between 1979 and 1986, he served as the chief executive officer of AT&T.

In 2003, Brown died aged 82 due to Parkinson's disease.
