= Oleana (restaurant) =

Restaurant in Cambridge, Massachusetts, U.S.

- Interactive map of Oleana

Restaurant information
- Established: 2001
- Owner: Ana Sortun
- Head chef: Ana Sortun
- Pastry chef: Maura Kilpatrick
- Food type: Middle Eastern
- Location: 134 Hampshire Street, Cambridge, Middlesex, Massachusetts, 02139
- Coordinates: 42.3705°N 71.0972°W
- Website: www.oleanarestaurant.com

Oleana is an Inman Square (Cambridge, Massachusetts) fine dining, Middle Eastern restaurant owned by Ana Sortun and opened in 2001. The menu also has Mediterranean influences. Culinary influences on the menu include Spain, Turkey and Armenia.

== Honors and awards ==
- 2022 Boston (magazine) Best Middle Eastern Restaurant
- Executive Chef Sortun and pastry chef Maura Kilpatrick have been nominated for James Beard Foundation Awards Including 2020, Best Pastry Chef and outstanding Chef
