= Mark Ladner =

American chef

Mark Ladner is a Cambridge, Massachusetts based chef and restaurateur, who owns Bar Enza in Harvard Square.

== Biography ==
Ladner was raised in Belmont, Massachusetts.

== Career ==
His first job was at Café Fiorella, also in Harvard Square. After graduating from Johnson & Wales University, he went to work for Todd English at Olives. Ladner worked there with Marc Orfaly and Barbara Lynch. He moved to Manhattan and was executive chef at Del Posto until 2017. While there, he won a James Beard Foundation Award for Best Chef in New York City and two Michelin Stars. The New York Times gave the restaurant a four star review. While in NYC, Ladner also worked for Scott Bryan and Jean-Georges Vongerichten.

At Del Posto, he was known for his 100 layer lasagna.

=== Television ===
From 2003 to 2008, he served as Mario Batali’s sous chef on Iron Chef America alongside Anne Burrell. When he appeared on Beat Bobby Flay, he competed against Flay but Flay won.
