= Food & Wine =

American monthly magazine

- 40th Anniversary Special Edition issue (September 2018)
- Editor in Chief: Hunter Lewis
- Frequency: Monthly
- Total circulation: 947,855 (June 2012)
- Founded: 1978
- Company: People Inc.
- Country: United States
- Based in: Birmingham, Alabama
- Language: English
- Website: foodandwine.com
- ISSN: 0741-9015

Food & Wine is an American monthly magazine published by People Inc.. It was founded in 1978 by Ariane and Michael Batterberry. It features recipes, cooking tips, travel information, restaurant reviews, chefs, wine pairings and seasonal/holiday content and has been credited by The New York Times with introducing the dining public to "Perrier, the purple Peruvian potato and Patagonian toothfish".

The premier event for the magazine is the Food & Wine Classic in Aspen, Colorado. The Classic features wine tasting, cooking demonstrations, and featured speakers as well as a cooking competition. Held annually in June, the event is considered the kickoff to the Aspen summer season and celebrated its 40th anniversary in 2023.

The winner of Top Chef, the reality television cooking competition, is featured in a spread in this magazine.

== History ==
Michael and Ariane Batterberry's early writing work on food included the 1973 book On the Town in New York, From 1776 to the Present, a culinary history of New York City that was republished in 1998 by Routledge in celebration of the book's 25th anniversary. The Batterberrys had first met an arts benefit on the roof of Manhattan's St. Regis Hotel and had not initially been food writers, with Michael working as a journalist and the couple working together as arts editors at Harper's Bazaar. They first conceived of the idea of writing a book about food all over the world after spending a weekend together with best-selling wine writer Hugh Johnson, who later dropped out of the writing project. The original edition of the book was described by The Washington Post as "the authoritative history of dining in the country's culinary capital". The Batterberrys saw "a big changeover at the moment we founded Food and Wine in the late '70s" from a time when "it was the little wife in the kitchen" to a period in which more men developed an interest in cooking.

With Robert and Lindy Kenyon covering the business side and with funding by Hugh Hefner, the Batterberrys started publishing The International Review of Food and Wine in 1978, which had a prototype issue published in Playboy. Later renamed simply Food & Wine, the magazine's mission was to be a more down-to-earth alternative to Gourmet and its "truffled pomposity," with the goal of appealing to both women and men as readers, and early issues featuring articles by such non-traditional food writers as George Plimpton and Wilfrid Sheed. When it was first published, a senior editor of Gourmet magazine scoffed at the new alternative, saying "We don't look at the others as competition. They look at us, try to copy us and fail miserably". By 1980, when it was sold to American Express, the magazine had circulation of 250,000 per issue, evenly split by gender, and as of 2009 it was distributing 900,000 copies a month. The magazine's style of simple meals, diet foods and easy-to-follow cooking instructions set a standard that became the model for a generation of cooking shows and publications. The Batterberrys went on to co-found Food Arts magazine, a publication aimed at restaurants and hotels.

== Editors-in-Chief ==
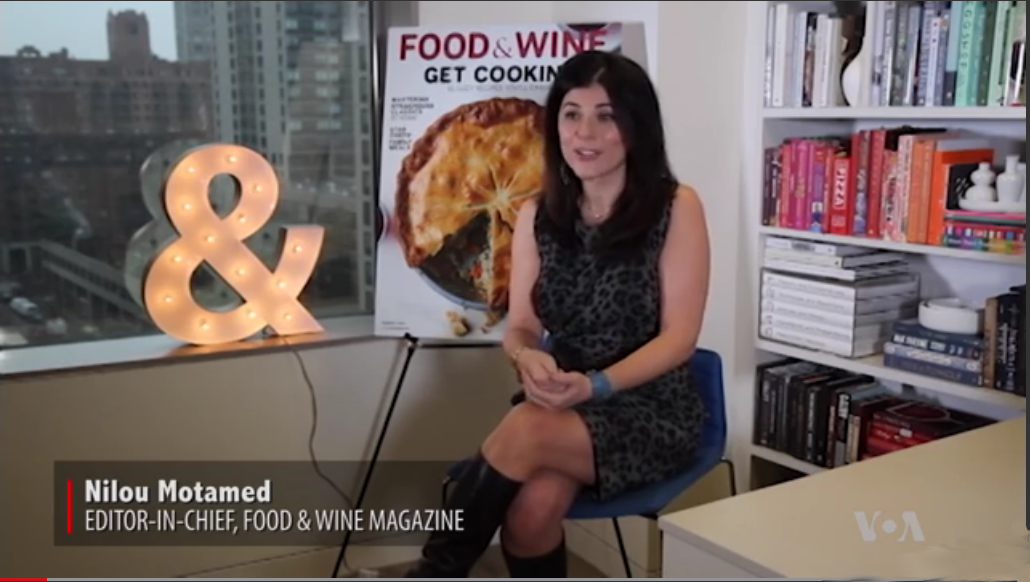
Nilou Motamed in 2017, speaking with the Voice of America about her role with the magazine.

Dana Cowin served as the editor-in-chief of Food & Wine for 21 years. She resigned from the post in late 2015. In February 2016, Nilou Motamed replaced her as editor-in-chief. In June 2017, Hunter Lewis replaced her as editor-in-chief.

== Food & Wine Classic ==
The Food & Wine Classic is an annual event presented by Food & Wine Magazine since 1983. The Classic takes place in Aspen, Colorado in June of each year. The event features wine tasting, cooking demonstrations, and featured speakers as well as a cooking competition.

The event celebrated its 30th anniversary in 2012, featuring singers Cee Lo Green, Elvis Costello, athlete Wes Welker, and chef Bobby Flay.

A trip to the event is offered as part of the grand prize for the winner of the reality television series Top Chef.

On June 19, 2011, QVC did broadcast the Food & Wine Classic live.

== Food & Wine Best New Chefs ==
Since 1988, Food & Wine has published an annual list of the ten best new chefs in America. Among the notable chefs recognized by the magazine are: Thomas Keller (1988), Nobu Matsuhisa (1989), Nancy Silverton (1990), Tom Colicchio (1991), Eric Ripert (1992), Nancy Oakes (1993), Michael Cordúa (1994), Anne Quatrano (1995), Barbara Lynch (1996), Daniel Patterson (1997), Michael Symon (1998), John Besh (1999), Andrew Carmellini (2000), Wylie Dufresne (2001), Grant Achatz (2002), Stuart Brioza (2003), Graham Elliot (2004), Daniel Humm (2005), David Chang (2006), Gabriel Rucker (2007), Ethan Stowell (2008), Linton Hopkins (2009), Roy Choi (2010), and Carlo Mirarchi (2011).

All of the Best New Chefs are listed below by year:

Year	Food & Wine Best New Chefs
1988	Bruce Auden, Daniel Boulud, Frank Brigtsen, Gordon Hamersley, Gordon Naccarato, Hubert Keller, Johanne Killeen and George Germon, Rick Bayless, Robert McGrath, Thomas Keller
1989	Christopher Gross, David Bouley, Debra Ponzek, Gary Danko, Jean Joho, Katsuo Sugiura, Keith Famie, Nobuyuki Matsuhisa, Susan Spicer, Susanna Foo
1990	David Holben and Lori Finkelman, Francesco Martorella and Bruce Lim, José Gutierrez, Mark Militello, Mark Peel and Nancy Silverton, Roberto Donna, Tom Valenti, Todd English
1991	Allen Susser, Gabriel Viti, Jack McDavid, John Farnsworth, Kevin Graham, Kevin Shikami, Lissa Doumani and Hiro Sone, Michael Romano, Tom Colicchio, Tim Anderson
1992	No Best New Chefs list
1993	Ben Barker, Celestino Drago, Don Yamauchi, Hubert Des Marais, Jim Galileo, Jody Adams, Gray Kunz, Larkin Selman, Mike Fennelly, Nancy Oakes
1994	Alessandro Stratta, Charles Wiley, Gerald Hirigoyen, Greg Sonnier, Matthew Kenney, Michael Cordúa, Reed Hearon, Rick Tramonto and Gale Gand, Robbin Haas, Tamara Murphy
1995	Charles Dale, Hallman Woods III, John Neal, John Schenk, Pascal Oudin, Anne Quatrano and Clifford Harrison, Terrance Brennan, Traci Des Jardins
1996	Barbara Lynch, Gilles Epié, Jim Moffat, Lance Dean Velasquez, Maria Helm Sinskey, Matthew Lake, Michael Schlow, Monica Pope, Nick Morfogen, Scott Bryan
1997	Dan Silverman, George W. Brown Jr., Daniel Patterson, John Cochran, Josiah Citrin and Raphael Lunetta, Keith Luce, Kelsie Kerr and Marsha McBride, Sotohiro Kosugi, Tim McKee, Tony Clark
1998	Anne Kearney, Danielle Custer, Guillermo Pernot, Katy Sparks, Laurent Tourondel, Lee Hefter, Michael Symon, Oliver Altherr, Rene Michelena, Trey Foshee
1999	Dale Reitzer, James Mazzio, James McDevitt, John Besh, Marc Vetri, Paul Kahan, Rocco DiSpirito, Ron Siegel, Steve Rosen, Suzanne Goin
2000	Amanda Lydon, Andrea Curto-Randazzo, Andrew Carmellini, Eric Moshier and Loren Falsone, Joseph Wrede, Michael Leviton, Takashi Yagihashi, Ted Cizma, Tim Goodell
2001	Anita Lo, Craig Stoll, E. Michael Reidt, Frank Ruta, Johnathan Sundstrom, Kelly Courtney, Randy Lewis, Sandro Gamba, Will Packwood, Wylie Dufresne
2002	Dan Barber and Mike Anthony, Deborah Knight, Fabio Trabocchi, Grant Achatz, Hugh Acheson, John Harris, Laurent Gras, Mark Sullivan, Suzanne Tracht, Thomas John
2003	Angel Palacios, Bruce Sherman, Bryan Moscatello, Cornelius Gallagher, David Bull, David Myers, Gabriel Kreuther, Nobuo Fukuda, Scott Tycer, Stuart Brioza
2004	Bradford Thompson, Dominique Filoni, Eric Michel Klein, Graham Elliot Bowles, Marc Orfaly, Mat Wolf, Melissa Perello, Rob Evans, Scott Conant, Scott Dolich
2005	Christophe Émé, Colby Garrelts, Eric Ziebold, Lachlan Mackinnon-Patterson, Maria Hines, Seth Bixby Daugherty, Shea Gallante, Tony Maws, Daniel Humm, Tyson Cole
2006	Cathal Armstrong, Christopher Lee, David Chang, Douglas Keane, Jason Wilson, Jonathan Benno, Mary Dumont, Michael Carlson, Pino Maffeo, Stewart Woodman
2007	April Bloomfield, Gabriel Bremer, Gabriel Rucker, Gavin Kaysen, Ian Schnoebelen, Johnny Monis, Matthew Dillon, Paul Virant, Sean O’Brien, Steve Corry
2008	Eric Warnstedt, Ethan Stowell, Gerard Craft, Giuseppe Tentori, Jeremy Fox, Jim Burke, Koren Grieveson, Michael Psilakis, Sue Zemanick, Tim Cushman
2009	Barry Maiden, Bryan Caswell, Christopher Kostow, Jon Shook, Kelly English, Linton Hopkins, Mark Fuller, Naomi Pomeroy, Nate Appleman, Paul Liebrandt, Vinny Dotolo
2010	Alex Seidel, Clayton Miller, James Syhabout, Jason Stratton, John Shields, Jonathon Sawyer, Matthew Lightner, Mike Sheerin, Missy Robbins, Roy Choi
2011	Bryce Gilmore, Carlo Mirarchi, George Mendes, James Lewis, Jamie Bissonnette, Jason Franey, Joshua Skenes, Kevin Willmann, Ricardo Zarate, Stephanie Izard, Viet Pham and Bowman Brown
2012	Corey Lee, Blaine Wetzel, Bryant Ng, Cormac Mahoney, Dan Kluger, Danny Grant, Erik Anderson and Josh Habiger, Jenn Louis, Karen Nicolas, Rich Torrisi and Mario Carbone, Tim Byres
2013	Danny Bowien, Justin Cogley, Matthew Gaudet, Jamie Malone, Chris Shepherd, Jose Enrique, Alex Stupak, Andy Ticer and Michael Hudman, Jason Vincent, Michael Voltaggio, Brendan McGill
2014	Matthew Accarrino, Greg Denton and Gabrielle Quiñónez Denton, Paul Qui, Justin Yu, Eli Kulp, Dave Beran, Ari Taymor, Cara Stadler, Matt McCallister, Joe Ogrodnek and Walker Stern, Carl Thorne-Thomsen
2015	Zoi Antonitsas, Jake Bickelhaupt, Jonathan Brooks, Katie Button, Jim Christiansen, Michael Fojtasek and Grae Nonas, Tim Maslow, Ori Menashe, Carlos Salgado, Bryce Shuman, Cory Bahr
2016	David Barzelay, Kevin Fink, Michael Gulotta, Ravi Kapur, Brad Kilgore, Edouardo Jordan, Iliana Regan, Aaron Silverman, Jeremiah Stone and Fabian von Hauske, Kris Yenbamroong
2017	Angie Mar, Jay Blackinton, Jordan Kahn, Nina Compton, Noah Sandoval, Peter Cho, Sara Kramer and Sarah Hymanson, Yoshi Okai, Val Cantu, Diego Galicia and Rico Torres
2018	Jess Shadbolt and Clare de Boer, Kevin Tien, Katianna Hong, Liz Johnson, Michael Gallina, Kate Williams, Jonathan Yao, Julia Sullivan, Diana Dávila, Brady Williams
2019	Kwame Onwuachi, Misti Norris, Mutsuko Soma, Matthew Kammerer, Nite Yun, Caroline Glover, Paxx Caraballo Moll, Junghyun Park, Brandon Go, Bryan Furman
2020	Nick Bognar, Tavel Bristol-Joseph, Trigg Brown, Camille Cogswell, Eunjo Park, Nivel Patel, Daisy Ryan, Lena Sareini, Donny Sirisavath, Douglass Williams
2021	Matt Horn, Paola Velez, Carlo Lamagna, Thessa Diadem, Fermín Nuñez, Angel Barreto, Ji Hye Kim, Blake Aguillard and Trey Smith, Gaby Maeda, Lucas Sin
2022	Warda Bouguettaya, Damarr Brown, Ana Castro, Calvin Eng, Tim Flores and Genie Kwon, Melissa Miranda, Justin Pichetrungsi, Emily Riddell, Rob Rubba, Caroline Schiff
2023	Amanda Schulman, Edgar Rico, Aisha Ibrahim, Isabel Coss, Steven Pursley, Nando and Valerie Chang, Hannah Ziskin, Ed Szymanski, Eunji Lee, Emmanuel Chavez
2024	LT Smith, Camari Mick and Mary Attea, Karyn Tomlinson, Leina Horii and Brian Lea, Erika Council, Wedchayan "Deau" Arpapornnopparat, Nicole Cabrera Mills, Jonny White and Jalen Heard and Lane Milne, Silver Iocovozzi
2025	Mariela Camancho, Vinnie Cimino, Aretah Ettarh, Kelly Jacques, Steve Joo, Telly Justice, Phila Lorn, Yotaka Martin, Colby Rasavong, Jordan Rubin

== Ownership ==
Food & Wine magazine was purchased from American Express Publishing by Time Inc. on October 1, 2013. Some editorial offices moved to the Time Inc office of Southern Living in Birmingham, Alabama in late 2017, and others remain in New York City. Meredith Corporation acquired Time Inc. in 2018. Dotdash closed on the purchase of Meredith in December 2021 to create the new company Dotdash Meredith, later rebranded as People Inc.

== See also ==
- List of food and drink magazines
