= Pu pu platter =

Tray of American Chinese cuisine

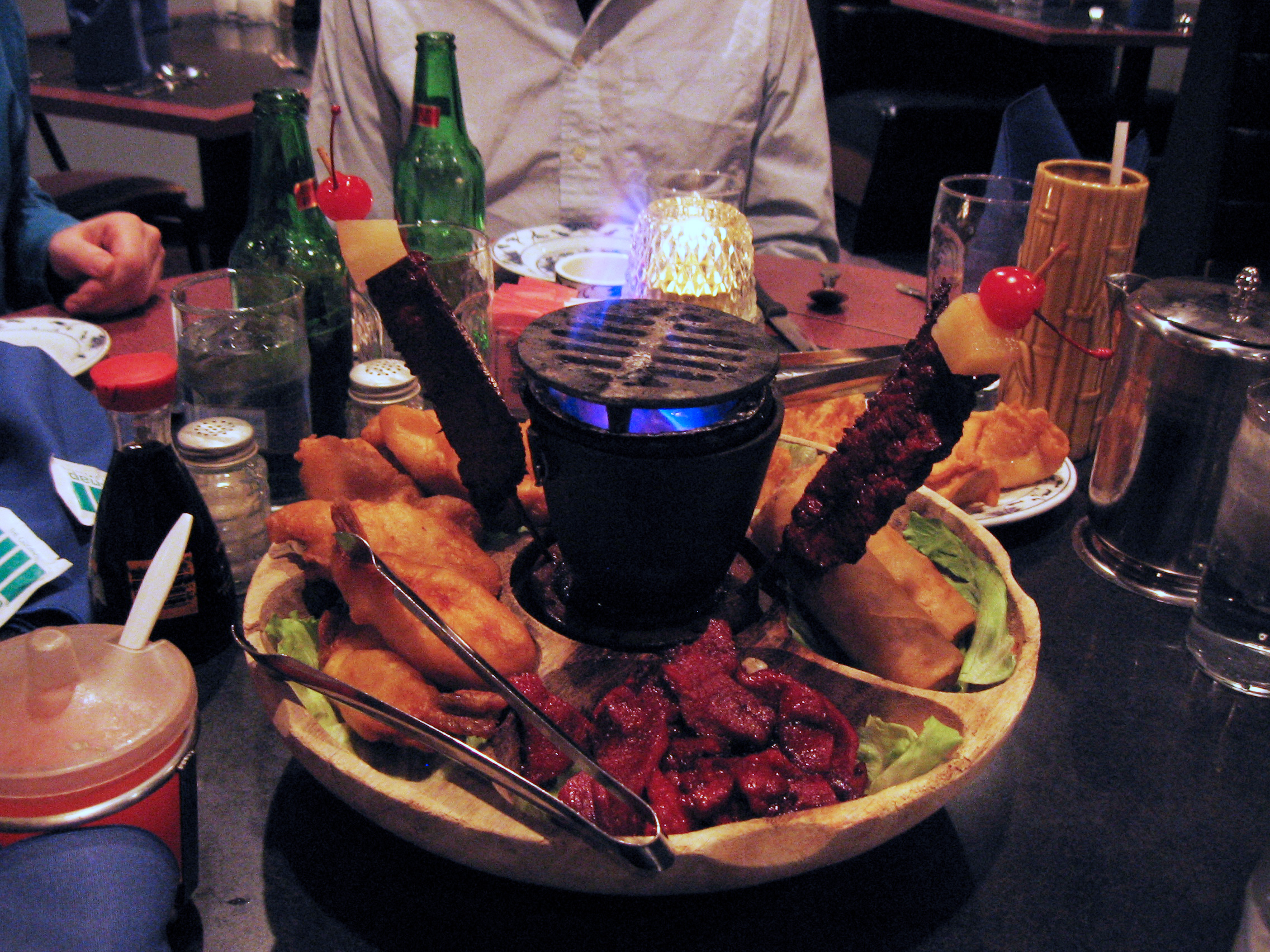
- Course: Hors d'oeuvre
- Main ingredients: Meat and seafood

Pu pu platter
- Traditional Chinese: 寶寶盤
- Simplified Chinese: 宝宝盘
Transcriptions
Standard Mandarin
- Hanyu Pinyin: bǎobǎo pán
- Gwoyeu Romatzyh: baobao parn
- Wade–Giles: pao^{3}-pao^{3} p'an^{2}
- IPA: [pàʊpàʊ pʰǎn]
Yue: Cantonese
- Yale Romanization: bóu-bóu pùhn
- Jyutping: bou2 bou2 pun4
- IPA: [pɔw pɔw˧˥ pʰun˩]

A pu pu platter is a tray of American Chinese or Hawaiian food consisting of an assortment of small meat and seafood appetizers. The Thrillist called the pu-pu platter "an amalgam of Americanized Chinese food, Hawaiian tradition and bar food."

The pu pu platter was probably first introduced to restaurants on the United States mainland by Donn Beach in 1934, and has since become a standard at most Polynesian-themed restaurants, such as Don's and Trader Vic's. However, pu pu platters are currently more closely associated with American Chinese restaurants. The earliest known print reference to a pu pu platter served at a Chinese restaurant is from 1969.

In New England, Italian restaurants have used the term "pu pu platter" to describe an appetizer combination platter since the 1970s.

A typical pu pu platter, as found in American Chinese cuisine, includes appetizers such as egg rolls, spare ribs, chicken wings, chicken fingers, beef teriyaki, skewered beef, fried wontons, fried shrimp, or crab rangoons.

== Hawaiian origin and etymology ==
In the Hawaiian language, pū-pū denotes a relish, appetizer, canapé, or hors d'oeuvre; it originally meant "shell fish', but also referred to small bits of fish, chicken, or banana relish served with kava.

== In Hawaiian cuisine ==
Since the introduction of commercial dining and drinking establishments in Hawaii, pūpū were, and remain, standard fare in island establishments. (Note: Unlike in American Chinese cuisine or mainland Polynesian-themed restaurants (like Trader Vic), the Hawaiian dish is referred to simply as pūpū or pūpūs, without the word platter.) An establishment that serves "heavy pupus" will often have a buffet table with warming trays or warming tables full of chicken, tempura vegetables, shrimp, poke (cubed and seasoned raw fish), small skewers of teriyaki meat or chicken, sushi, and other similar finger foods. An establishment that serves "light pupus" usually will offer only the cold foods such as poke, sushi, and vegetables. Some establishments will serve pūpū to the table.

At Hawaiian bars, restaurants, catered events such as political rallies, and private parties, establishments and hosts are known in "local" circles by the quality of their pupus. Event invitations often will state that "light pupus" or "heavy pupus" will be served so that attendees will know whether they should plan to have a full meal before the event or not.

== In mainland Polynesian cuisine ==
At the height of the tiki bar craze during the late 1950s and early 1960s, the New York Herald Tribune published several articles concerning the opening and the ambiance of one of the first Hawaiian-themed restaurants in New York City, Luau 400, on East 57th Street. At the time of the restaurant's opening in 1957, pu pu platters were considered a part of the luau feast. A typical platter at this establishment would have included baked clams, rumaki, Shrimp Vela (battered fried shrimp with coconut), chicken wings, egg rolls, spare ribs, or Javanese sate (satay) on skewers. The appetizers were served on "a Lazy Susan made of monkey pod wood and equipped with a little stove fired with charcoal briquettes." Recipes for some of the pu pu items were later published in the Herald Tribune in 1960.

Always the showman, Trader Vic included a hibachi grill when presenting a pu pu platter at the table. Others say that the idea could have come from Donn Beach. No one can agree, but everyone else appeared to have copied the idea.

By the twenty-first century, the tiki bars and the flaming pu pu platter had become a dying art. Some tiki bar aficionados have created lists of tiki bars in the United States in which a flaming pu pu can still be found.

At one 21st-century tiki bar, the pu pu platter includes "Samoan deviled eggs, Chinese sausage and stick[y] rice arancini, coconut shrimp and chilies stuffed with pork sausage." As bar food, a pu pu platter at a 21st-century New York City brasserie could include French escargot, grilled cubed tropical fruits (such as pineapple), fried pierogi or American-style barbecued ribs and wings.

== In Italian restaurants ==
Italian restaurants in New England may offer "Italian pu pu platters". Depending on the establishment, the platters may contain only appetizers, such as mozzarella sticks, meatballs, sausages, lasagna sticks, and calamari; or they may contain small portions of different pasta dishes, such as spaghetti, lasagna, manicotti, and ravioli.

== See also ==
- American Chinese cuisine
- Cuisine of Hawaii
- List of hors d'oeuvre
- Anju (food) – Korean term for food eaten with alcohol
- Canapé – Hors d'œuvre
- Dim sum – Chinese cuisine
- Kap klaem – Thai term for food consumed with alcohol
- Meze – Small dish in Middle Eastern and Balkan cuisines
- Pusas – Traditional appetiser or snack eaten with alcohol in Sabah, Malaysia
- Sakana – Japanese snacks, eaten with alcohol
- Siu laap – Chinese regional cuisine from Guangdong
- Tapas – Appetiser or snack in Spanish and international cuisine
- Zakuski – Russian term for appetizers served before meals
