= Mariana Nolasco =

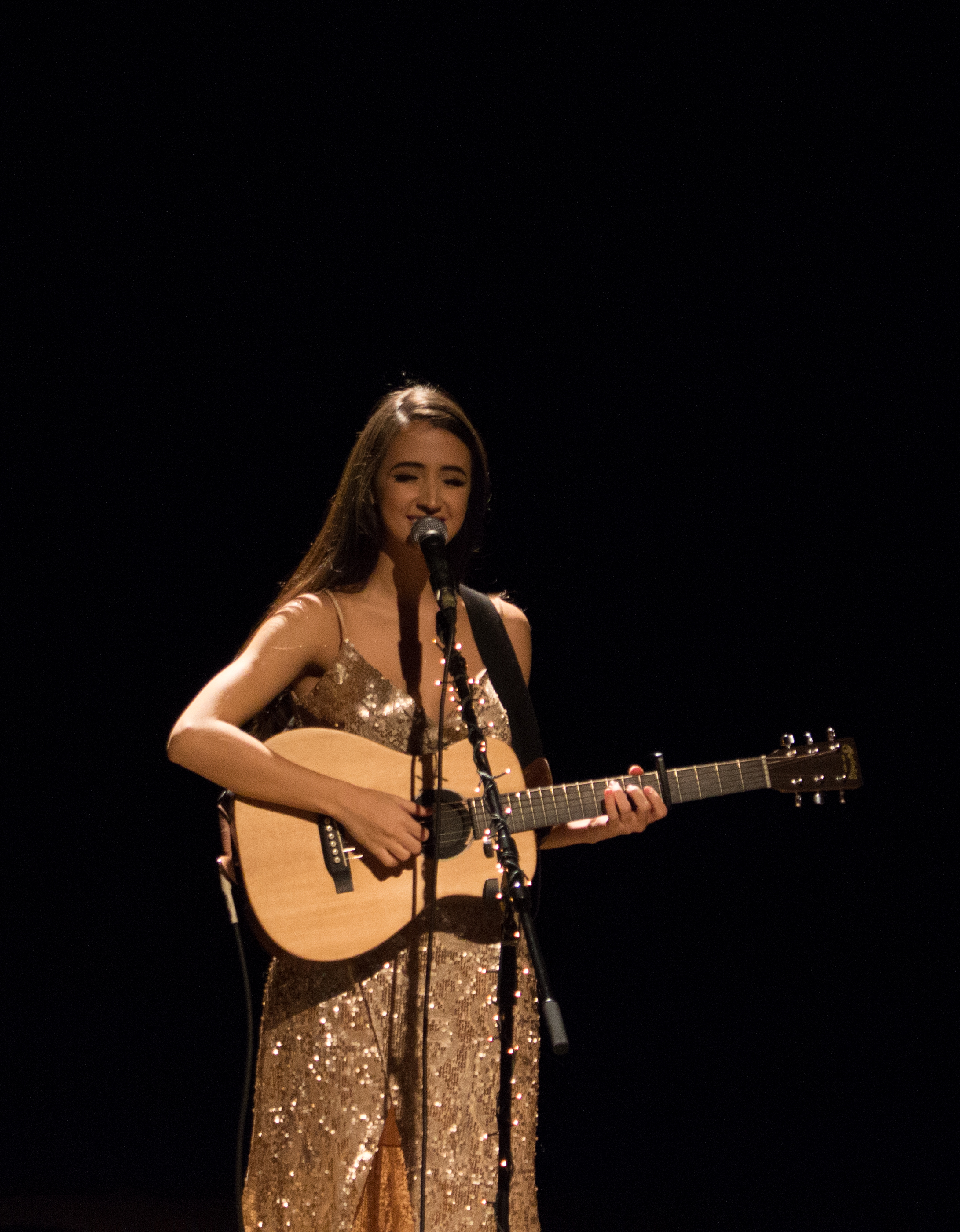

Background information
- Born: February 9, 1998 (age 28); Campinas
- Genres: Pop; MPB
- Years active: 2014–present
- Website: Official website

Mariana Nolasco (born February 9, 1998) is a singer, songwriter, YouTuber, and Brazilian actress.

== Career ==
Nolasco was inspired to play music by her brother. She started learning guitar aged 13 and began uploading videos of her performing music onto Facebook. She achieved widespread popularity in Brazil after the performances on her YouTube channel went viral. She has since collaborated with Boyce Avenue and Jota Quest.

In 2018, she embarked on a mini-tour of Brazil, covering ten states in 25 shows over two months. All gigs sold out.

== Filmography ==
In addition, Mariana participated in the film "Two Brothers" (2004), directed by Luiz Fernando Carvalho, that was released on Rede Globo.

Year	Title	Note
2008	Faça Sua História	episode: "O Sósia"
2008	Two Brothers	
2008	Beleza Pura	
2009	Viver a Vida	
2011	Fina Estampa	
2012	Super Chef Celebrities	
2014	Império	
2015	Tomara Que Caia	episode: "Erra uma Vez"
2015	Vai Que Cola	episode: "A Exdinando"
2015	Totalmente Demais	
2017	Belaventura	

=== Awards and nominations ===
In 2017, she was nominated for the Multishow Brazilian Music Award for Best Web Cover.
