= Rob Rubba =

American chef

Rob Rubba is an American chef. He grew up in New Jersey and his first chef job was in the pastry department of the Mohegan Sun resort and casino in Connecticut. He worked for Todd English in Connecticut, for Gordon Ramsay in New York City, and for Charlie Trotter and Guy Savoy in Las Vegas before opening his own restaurant, Hazel, in Washington, D.C. in 2016.

Hazel was recognized as the Restaurant Association Metropolitan Washington’s New Restaurant of the Year in 2017, and was named to the Michelin Guide's Bib Gourmand list for 2018. Rubba left Hazel in June 2018 after he gave up eating meat.

In 2020, Rubba opened a new restaurant in Washington called Oyster Oyster, with a menu featuring sustainable ingredients, including oyster mushrooms and true oysters, the only animal on the menu. Oyster Oyster was named one of the best new restaurants in America by Esquire. In 2022, the restaurant was awarded a Michelin star.

Rubba was named 2022 Chef of the Year by the Restaurant Association Metropolitan Washington. Later that year, he was recognized by Food & Wine as one of the country's Best New Chefs. In 2023, he won the James Beard Award for Outstanding Chef.
