= Don Yamauchi =

American chef

Don Yamauchi is an American chef whose career has included executive-chef positions at Carlos', Gordon, Le Français, Tribute, and casino restaurants in Detroit. In 1993, Food & Wine named him one of its Best New Chefs.

== Career ==
Yamauchi is a Chicago native of Japanese and Filipino ancestry. After culinary school, he joined Carlos' in Highland Park, Illinois, where he rose from prep cook to executive chef in four years. He later worked at Gordon in Chicago and at Le Français in Wheeling, Illinois. After serving as executive chef at Le Français, Yamauchi and restaurateur Phil Mott became its owners when founder Jean Banchet retired. The restaurant closed in June 2003 amid declining business.

In January 2005, Yamauchi succeeded Takashi Yagihashi as executive chef of Tribute in Farmington Hills, Michigan. He left in September 2007 to oversee Michael Mina's Bourbon Steak and Saltwater restaurants at MGM Grand Detroit. By 2011, he was executive chef at MotorCity Casino Hotel in Detroit. In 2016, he joined Ameristar Casino Resort Spa St. Charles after working at Belterra Park in Cincinnati.

In 2020, Yamauchi and his wife, Cleta, joined Debra and Jeramie Campana in opening 400 Rabbits, a Mexican-fusion restaurant on Sanibel, Florida. The restaurant was destroyed by Hurricane Ian in September 2022. In May 2024, the Yamauchis and a business partner acquired the Fort Collins and Loveland locations of Big City Burrito in Colorado. The following year, the family acquired Cables Pub & Grill in Greeley, Colorado, with plans to rebrand it as Big City Roadhouse.
