= Jake Bickelhaupt =

American chef

Jake Bickelhaupt is an American chef and restaurateur who co-owned and operated the Michelin-starred 42 Grams in Chicago, Illinois, with his then-wife Alexa Welsh, between 2014 and 2017, and Konro in West Palm Beach, Florida, with his current wife Nadia Bickelhaupt, between 2022 and 2025. Following the closure of 42 Grams in 2017, he pleaded guilty to one charge of battery against Welsh, and was again arrested in 2025 on the charge of domestic violence, against Nadia.

== Biography ==
In January 2014, Bickelhaupt opened 42 Grams, a restaurant in Chicago, Illinois, alongside his then-wife and general manager, Alexa Welsh. 42 Grams received two Michelin stars within its first year of operation and was the subject of a 2017 documentary of the same name. Bickelhaupt divorced in January of 2017 and initially planned to continue the restaurant through its lease expiration in November, but on June 4 Bickelhaupt assaulted Welsh, leading a diner to call police. Later that evening, Bickelhaupt tweeted an announcement that the restaurant was closing, effective immediately.

In May 2019, Bickelhaupt opened another restaurant, Stone Flower, also in Chicago. Stone Flower closed following the COVID-19 pandemic. He self-financed a second documentary, 86ed, which was released in 2021 and focused on his efforts to "rebuild his life amid a cloud of cancel culture and online bullying". It did not cover Welsh's version of events.

Since 2020, Bickelhaupt has been married to his wife Nadia; in 2022 they opened Konro restaurant in West Palm Beach, Florida. Konro was a ten-seat tasting menu-only restaurant and offered wine pairings as well as a non-alcoholic pairing. Konro became the only restaurant in the Miami area to earn a Michelin star in April 2025, before closing two months later in the aftermath of Bickelhaupt's arrest. Michelin revoked the star in August.

=== Domestic violence incidents ===
Bickelhaupt was arrested on June 6, 2017 for the attack on Welsh that led to the closure of 42 Grams, and pleaded guilty to charges of simple battery in July. In 86'd he claimed that he had quit earlier that night, gotten drunk, and did not remember the incident. Financial disputes arose related to the restaurant's closing and Bickelhaupt's alleged use of restaurant funds for personal expenses, and Bickelhaupt and Welsh's out-of-court settlement included a non-disparage agreement, which prevents them from publicly saying negative things about one other. In 2018, Bickelhaupt replied to an Eater request for comment: “I was arrested for a single instance of violence. I will be forever regretful for my actions and the harm I caused. I take full responsibilities for my actions and will continue to do so for the rest of my life. There was no excuse for my actions. I have taken steps and found the help I needed to ensure nothing of this sort will ever happen again and I know I am a better person today than I was on that day.”

Seven years later, Bickelhaupt was again arrested for domestic violence on June 2, 2025. He allegedly beat his wife, Nadia, for two hours, causing her to experience a seizure and leaving her with a subdural hematoma. Five days later, the Palm Beach County State Attorney’s Office added charges of witness tampering and violating a domestic violence injunction, claiming that Jake had left voicemails to a shared restaurant number, instructing Nadia on what to tell authorities to facilitate his release from custody. His felony battery charges were upgraded to attempted second-degree murder and false imprisonment on June 11, though the charges of witness tampering were later reduced to misdemeanor violation of pretrial conditions. As of October 2025, Bickelhaupt remained held without bond.

== Awards and recognition ==
Bickelhaupt's restaurant 42 Grams received two Michelin stars in 2014, and Food & Wine named him one of the best new chefs of 2015. In April 2025, his West Palm Beach restaurant, Konro, became the only restaurant in the Miami area to earn a Michelin star, but Michelin revoked the star in August in the aftermath of Bickelhaupt's arrest and the restaurant's subsequent closure.
