= Sarma Melngailis =

American restaurateur (born 1972)

- Born: September 10, 1972 (age 54)
- Citizenship: American, Latvian
- Education: University of Pennsylvania (BS, BA); French Culinary Institute
- Known for: Restaurateur (2001–2015), Fugitive, convicted of fraud (2015–2017)
- Spouse: Anthony Strangis (m. 2012; div. 2018)
- Culinary career
- Cooking style: Vegan, Raw foodism
- Previous restaurants
- Commissary, New York City (2001–2003), * Pure Food and Wine, New York City (2004–2016), * One Lucky Duck Juice and Takeaway, New York City (2007–2015), * One Lucky Duck, Chelsea Market, New York City (2009–2015), * One Lucky Duck Juice and Takeaway, San Antonio, Texas (2014–2016)
- Website: www.sarmaraw.com

Sarma Melngailis (born September 10, 1972) is an American chef, cookbook author, businesswoman and convicted criminal. She was the owner and co-founder of Pure Food and Wine and One Lucky Duck, both vegan raw food restaurants in New York City. Melngailis' restaurant appeared in New York Magazine's Top 100 Restaurants round up, and made it into Forbes' list of All Star New York Eateries for five consecutive years. Both businesses closed in 2016 after staff walked out over unpaid wages. After fleeing New York with husband Anthony Strangis, Melngailis was tracked down in Tennessee and arrested in 2016. She pleaded guilty in 2017 to grand larceny, scheming to defraud, and criminal tax fraud. She admitted stealing over $2 million from investors and employees. She spent nearly four months in jail.

== Early life and education ==
Sarma Melngailis was born September 10, 1972, in the United States, and was raised in Newton, Massachusetts. Melngailis's father John Melngailis was born in Riga, Latvia and was a physicist at Massachusetts Institute of Technology (MIT). Her early interest in food came from her mother, a professional chef. Her parents divorced when she was nine years old.

She attended Newton North High School. Melngailis graduated from the University of Pennsylvania in 1994 with a B.A. degree, and a B.S. degree in economics from the Wharton School.

Melngailis moved to New York City, working at the investment firm Bear Stearns until 1996, then moving to Bain Capital in Boston, working in private equity investment. She returned to New York City in 1998 and joined a high-yield investment fund at CIBC, but soon left to enroll at New York's French Culinary Institute from which she graduated in 1999.

== Career ==
=== Restaurants ===
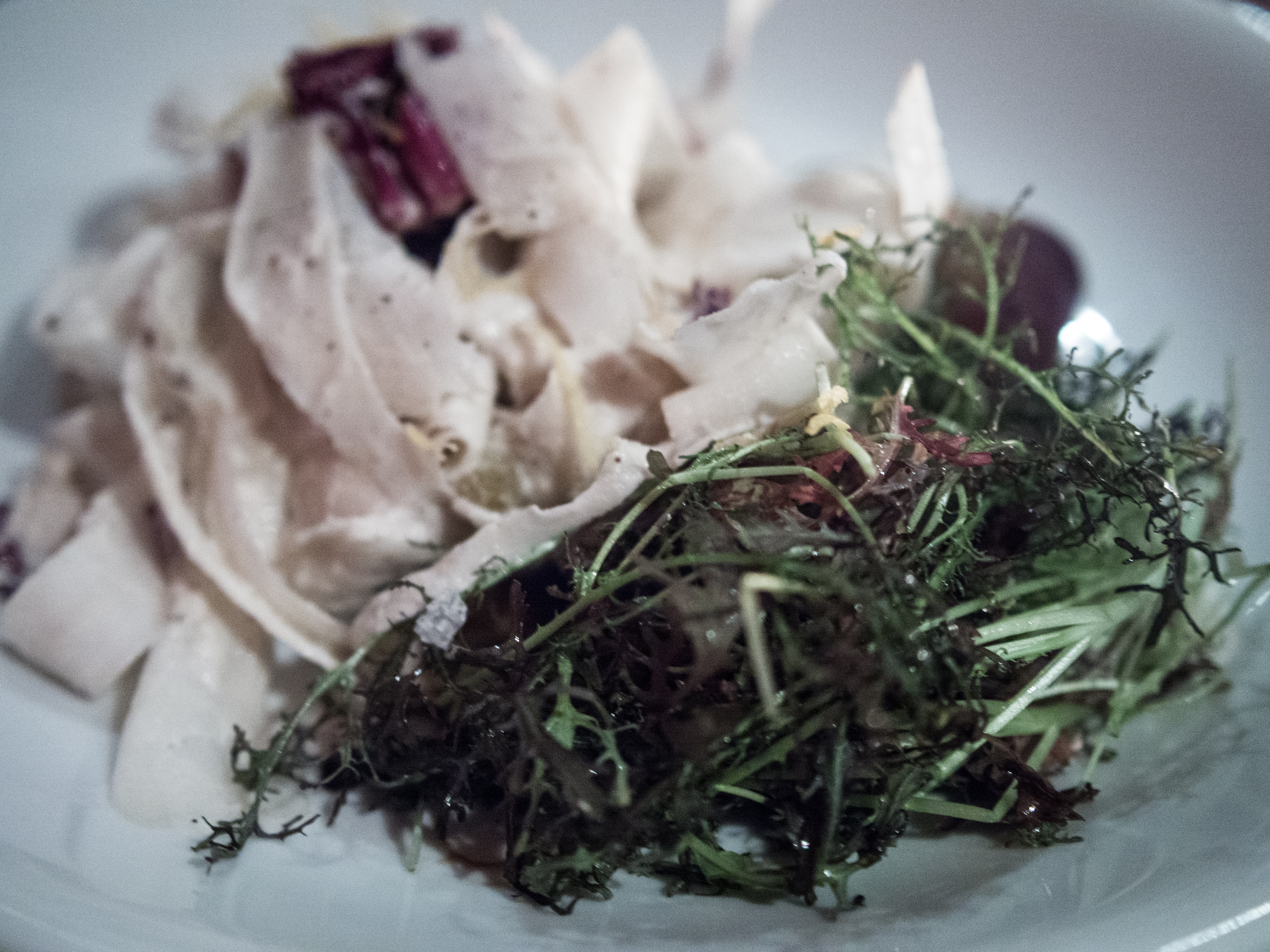
Salsify noodles with radicchio and fresh figs, a dish from Pure Food & Wine in 2013

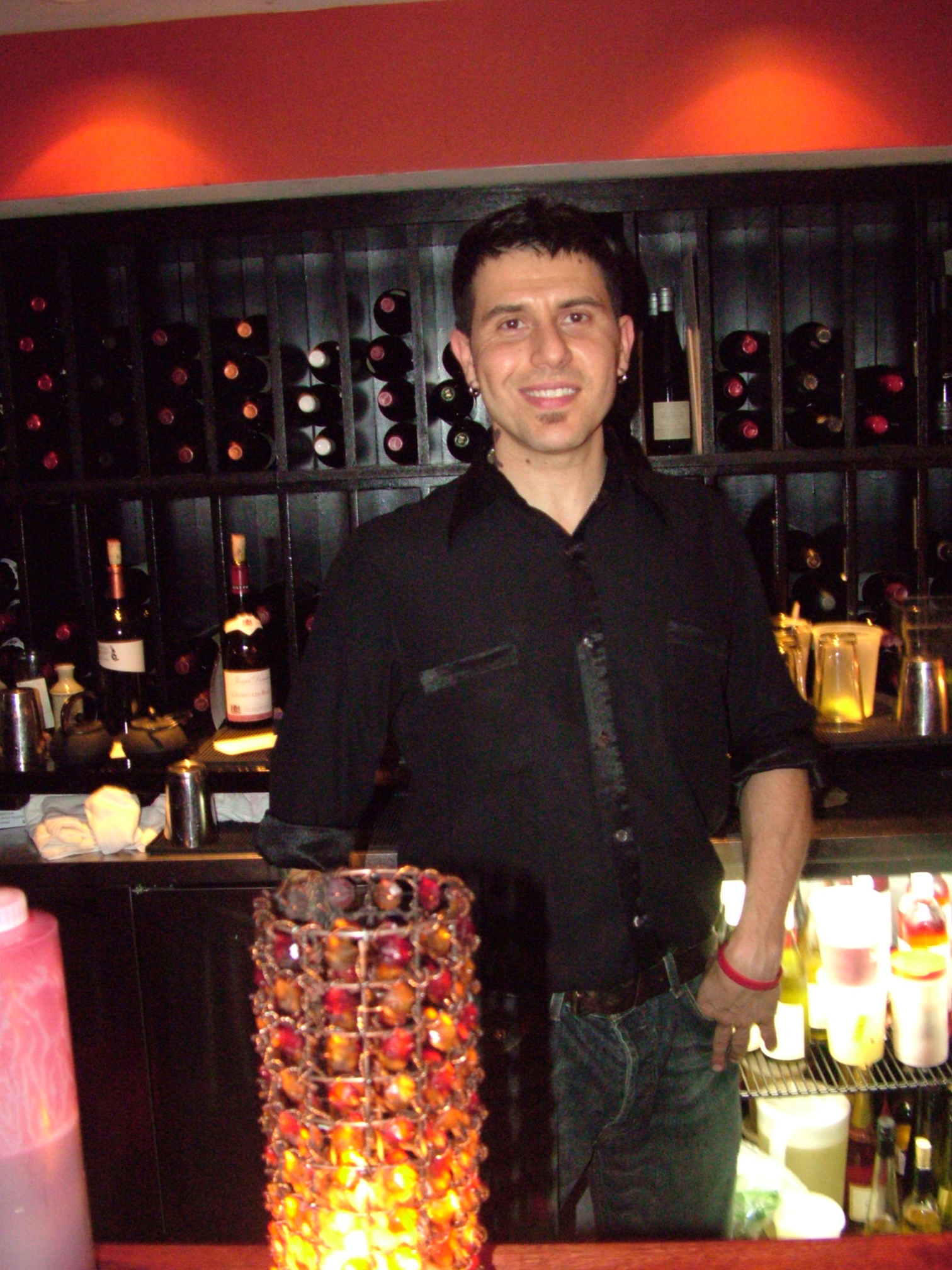
Wine server from Pure Food & Wine in 2013

Together with chef, author, and speaker Matthew Kenney, her then-boyfriend, she opened Commissary in 2001, but it closed in March 2003, after which she consulted for Jeffrey Chodorow's China Grill Management.

In June 2004, Melngailis with Chodorow and Kenney, opened Pure Food and Wine as New York City's first upscale raw food restaurant. Located in Manhattan's Gramercy Park neighborhood, the restaurant was listed twice in New York magazine's "Top 100 Restaurants" and in "The Platt 101" and five years in a row in Forbes magazine's list of "All Star New York Eateries." In 2009, Melngailis believed that Kenney gave inadequate attention to the financial side of the Pure Food and Wine operation; Chodorow, taken by the strength of her business school and financial background, expelled Kenney from the operation and lent Melngailis US$2.1 million to buy the business outright.

The trio opened One Lucky Duck Juice and Takeaway in 2007, a takeaway retail store attached to Pure Food and Wine. The website OneLuckyDuck.com, launched in 2005, was an online store for snacks prepared and packaged from Pure Food and Wine, as well as ingredients, skincare, supplements, books, apparel, and home products, all related to raw and organic living. A second One Lucky Duck location was open in New York City's Chelsea Market from December 2009 through January 2015.

From 2014 until July 2016, One Lucky Duck Juice and Takeaway operated in San Antonio, Texas, the first location outside of New York City.

=== Controversy ===
In January 2015, Pure Food and Wine and One Lucky Duck staff walked out en masse due to Melngailis' failure to pay employees a month's worth of owed wages. This was the second time within a year that a month's worth of wages had been withheld, the first being in July 2014.

Melngailis addressed the walkout and subsequent closure of both restaurants in a blog post posted in February 2015. She apologized for the incident, but later deleted the post. In an interview with Well+Good, Melngailis stated that the delayed wages were due to slim margins caused by debts and expensive ingredients, and that she had also previously missed her own rent payments. During the ordeal, Melngailis provided employees with a different explanation, blaming the situation on changing banks.

In April 2015, Pure Food and Wine, One Lucky Duck, and OneLuckyDuck.com reopened. A majority of staff did not return to the restaurant after its reopening. In July of that year, the staff of both restaurants walked out due to unpaid wages. Both establishments have been permanently shut down. The Pure Food and Wine restaurant closed in spring 2016.

== Arrest and guilty plea ==
On May 12, 2016, it was reported that Melngailis and her then-husband Anthony Strangis were arrested in Sevierville, Tennessee, after he ordered a pizza from Domino's Pizza. The couple were staying in separate hotel rooms. It was reported that "In addition to the fugitive from justice warrants, Strangis was wanted for grand larceny, scheme to defraud and violation of labor law. Melngailis was wanted for grand larceny, criminal tax fraud, scheme to defraud and violation of labor law."

On December 19, 2016, prosecutors offered Melngailis a plea deal in which she would agree to serve one to three years in prison. Melngailis' attorneys were reported by Vanity Fair to be planning a "coercive control" defense. Melngailis pleaded guilty in May 2017 to stealing more than $2,000,000 from investors, and scheming to defraud, as well as criminal tax fraud charges. She received a jail sentence of nearly four months. She filed for divorce from Strangis in May 2018.

The 2022 Netflix documentary series Bad Vegan: Fame. Fraud. Fugitives. details Melngailis' scandals, including her relationship with Strangis and her financial crimes. Melngailis disputes the veracity of the series and its conclusions citing numerous misrepresentations of her story in an attempt to heighten drama, particularly in the show’s final minutes.

== List of restaurants ==
- Commissary, New York City (2001–2003),
- Pure Food and Wine, New York City (2004–2016),
- One Lucky Duck Juice and Takeaway, New York City (2007–2015),
- One Lucky Duck, Chelsea Market, New York City (2009–2015),
- One Lucky Duck Juice and Takeaway, San Antonio, Texas (2014–2016)

== Bibliography ==
- Kenney, Matthew; Melngailis, Sarma (2005). Raw Food for the Real World: 100 Recipes to Get the Glow. Regan Books. ISBN 0060793554.
- Melngailis, Sarma (2009). Living Raw Food: Get the Glow with More Recipes from Pure Food and Wine. New York City, NY: Harper Collins. ISBN 9780061940491.
- The Girl with the Duck Tattoo: A Memoir (Lioncrest Publishing, 2025) ISBN 9781544548982
