= Bad Vegan: Fame. Fraud. Fugitives. =

2022 Netflix docuseries

- Genre: Docu-series
- Directed by: Chris Smith
- Music by: Dan Romer
- Country of origin: United States
- Original language: English
- No. of seasons: 1
- No. of episodes: 4

Production
- Executive producers: Ryann Fraser; Chris Smith; Mark Emms
- Cinematography: Britton Foster; Antonio Rossi
- Editors: Amanda Griffin; Michael Mahaffie
- Running time: 44–61 minutes
- Production companies: Library Films; Eastern Road Films

Original release
- Network: Netflix
- Release: March 16, 2022

Bad Vegan: Fame. Fraud. Fugitives. is a 2022 Netflix docuseries by director Chris Smith. It documents how restaurateur Sarma Melngailis illegally transferred money to her husband so he could pay a deity to bestow immortality upon them.

== Synopsis ==
The series tells the story of Sarma Melngailis, former owner of the New York City vegan restaurant Pure Food and Wine. Melngailis met and married conman Anthony Strangis (who called himself Shane Fox), and she alleged that he coerced her into stealing money from her own restaurant and later going on the run from authorities. The pair were ultimately charged with transferring over $1.6 million from the restaurant into their personal accounts.

== Episodes ==
No.	Title	Directed by	Original release date
1	"Mr. & Mrs. Fox"	Chris Smith	March 16, 2022
2	"Happily Ever After"	Chris Smith	March 16, 2022
3	"No Angels in Hell"	Chris Smith	March 16, 2022
4	"Everything Will Be Fine"	Chris Smith	March 16, 2022

== Reception ==
On review aggregator website Rotten Tomatoes, the limited series holds a 94% approval rating based on 17 critic reviews, with an average rating of 7.4/10. On Metacritic, the series has a score of 72 out of 100, based on 10 critics, indicating "generally favorable reviews".

Lucy Mangan of The Guardian gave the show a rating of 3/5 and described it as "[An] unhurried but fascinating four-part documentary..."

Melngailis herself disputes the veracity of the series and its conclusions, citing numerous misrepresentations of her story in an attempt to heighten drama in ways that impugn her character, particularly in the editing of the show's final minutes.
