= Camille Cogswell =

Pastry and executive chef

Camille Cogswell is a pastry and executive chef.

== Career ==
A 2013 graduate of The Culinary Institute of America at Hyde Park, her first job was at Brooklyn Fair for pastry chef Alex Grunert.

When Cogswell won the James Beard Award and Food & Wine award, she was the executive chef at K'Far and executive pastry chef at Zahav, both in Philadelphia. She joined them in 2015, but was let go by the parent company in 2020.

She owns Walnut Farm Bakery in Marshall, North Carolina.

== Awards and honors ==
Food & Wine named Cogswell as one of the Best New Chefs in 2020. In 2018, she was the James Beard Rising Star Chef of the Year.
