= Veritas (restaurant) =

Defunct restaurant in New York City, U.S.

- Interactive map of Veritas

Restaurant information
- Established: 1999
- Closed: 2013
- Previous owner: Scott Bryan
- Head chef: Scott Bryan
- Location: 43 East 20th Street, New York City, New York, 10003, United States
- Coordinates: 40°44′19.7″N 73°59′18.6″W

Veritas was a restaurant in the Flatiron District of Manhattan in New York City. The restaurant operated from 1999 to 2013, and had received a Michelin star. Veritas was owned and operated by Scott Bryan.

== See also ==
- List of defunct restaurants of the United States
- List of Michelin-starred restaurants in New York City
