= Harbor House (restaurant) =

Restaurant in Elk, Mendocino County, California, U.S.

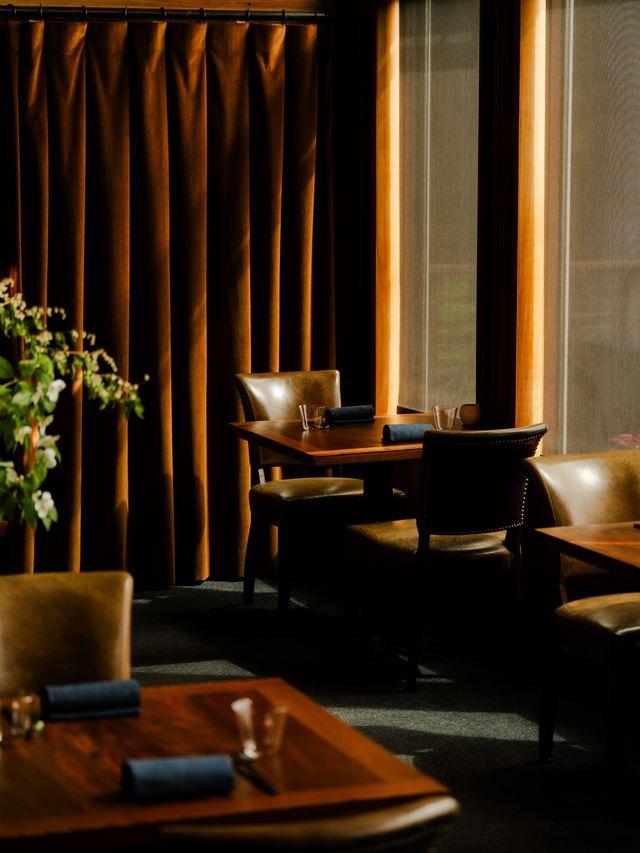
- Interior view of Harbor House restaurant
- Interactive map of Harbor House

Restaurant information
- Chef: Matthew Kammerer
- Food type: Californian
- Rating: (Michelin Guide)
- Location: 5600 CA-1, Elk, California, 95432, United States
- Coordinates: 39°8′8.5″N 123°43′10.5″W
- Seating capacity: 20-seat oceanview-dining room
- Reservations: Required
- Website: .theharborhouseinn.com

Harbor House is a restaurant in Elk, Mendocino County, California, United States. The restaurant serves Californian cuisine and has received two Michelin stars. Matthew Kammerer is the chef.

== See also ==
- List of Michelin-starred restaurants in California
