= Matthew Kenney =

American celebrity chef

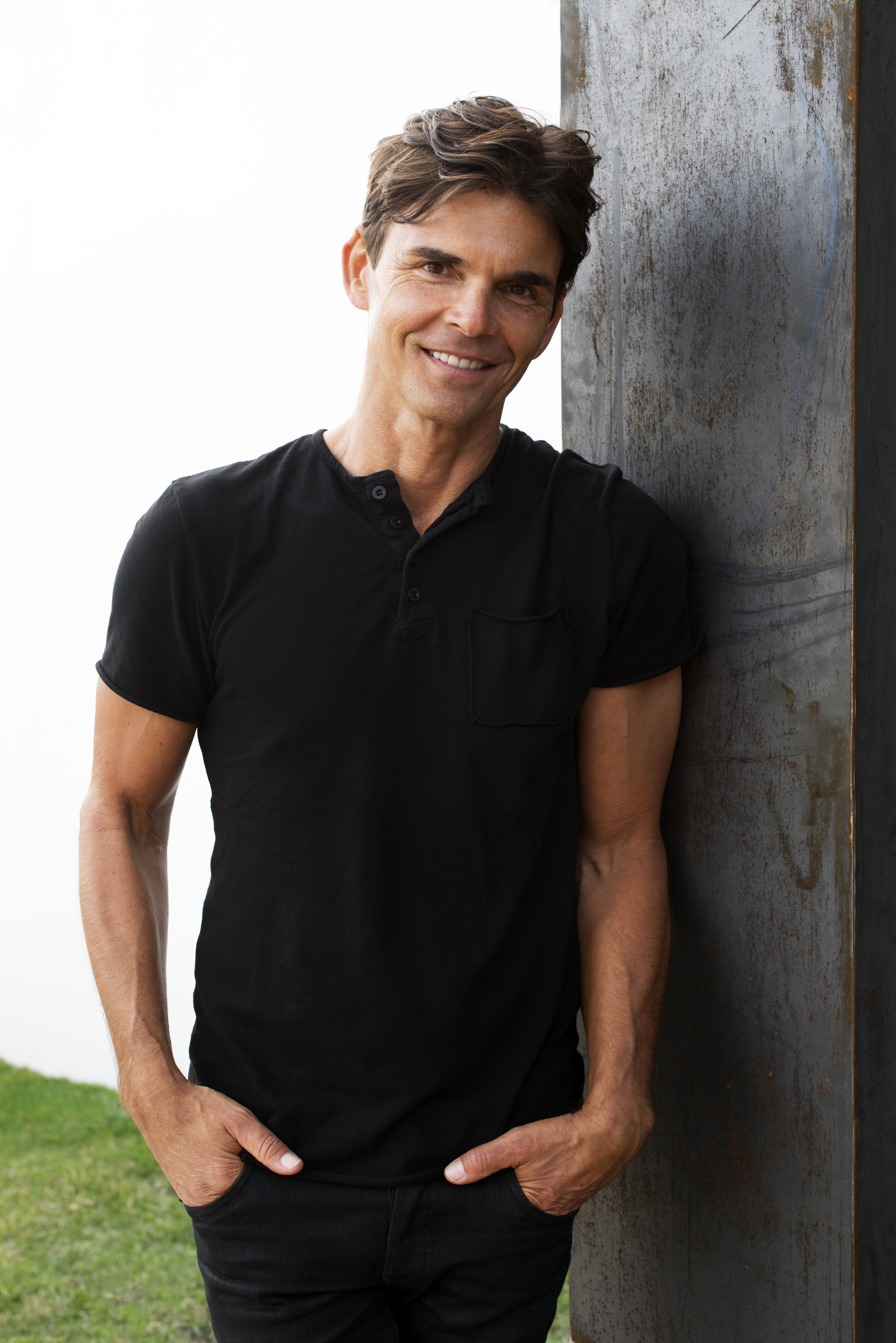
- Kenney in 2016
- Born: Connecticut, U.S.
- Education: University of Maine (BA); International Culinary Center
- Culinary career
- Awards
- Food & Wine (1994)
- Website: matthewkenneycuisine.com

Matthew Kenney is an American celebrity chef, entrepreneur, author, and educator specializing in plant-based cuisine. He is the author of 12 cookbooks, founder of dozens of vegan restaurants, and founder of the companies Matthew Kenney Cuisine and Matthew Kenney Culinary, a plant-based diet education business.

== Early life and education ==
Kenney was born in the U.S. state of Connecticut, and grew up in Searsport, Maine. After graduating from the University of Maine with a degree in political science, he became a chef. He attended the French Culinary Institute, now the International Culinary Center, learning classical culinary techniques. Upon graduating in 1990, he worked at various kitchens in New York City.

== Career ==
Kenney opened his namesake restaurant Matthew's in 1993 in New York City. He became Food & Wine magazine's "1994 Best New Chef". He opened the restaurants Mezze, Monzu Canteen, Commune, and Commissary. Kenney has said the economic slump caused by the September 11 attacks caused his restaurants to close. Between 2021 and 2024, at least 17 of Kenney's restaurants closed.

=== Pure Food and Wine ===
Kenney, partner Sarma Melngailis and investor Jeffrey Chodorow in 2004 opened a vegan restaurant, Pure Food and Wine, in New York City.

Kenney left Pure Food and Wine in 2005, and the owner and manager sued him, alleging he broke his contract.

=== Culinary academy ===
In 2009, Kenney opened his first culinary academy in Oklahoma City. In 2012, he moved the renamed Matthew Kenney Culinary Academy to Santa Monica, California, and relocated his company to Los Angeles. In 2013, he established a campus of the academy in Belfast, Maine. In 2017, he sold the academy to Adam Zucker.

=== Matthew Kenney Cuisine ===
In 2012 Kenney formed Matthew Kenney Cuisine, a Los Angeles-based restaurant lifestyle company offering a variety of plant-based services and products, including hospitality, education, media, products and services. As of 2022, Matthew Kenney Cuisine operates more than 50 active restaurants, in more than 12 countries.

In 2017, he was sued for unpaid rent at the popular Plant Food and Wine in Miami. In December 2017, he faced debt and foreclosure proceedings in Belfast, Maine, on a building that housed his former culinary academy.

In 2019, Matthew Kenney Cuisine opened an all-vegan food hall Plant City in Providence, Rhode Island. In 2019, he launched Ntidote Life nutrition bars with Dr. Amir Marashi.

== Legal issues ==
In 2022, the contents of Kenney's restaurant Sestina were auctioned off by the state of New York for unpaid taxes and the Double Zero in Boston was closed by sheriff deputies because of unpaid rent. His restaurant Plant Pub Fenway was evicted for unpaid rent, also in 2022.

As of 2024, multiple lawsuits that allege fraud, illegal labor practices, harassment, or failing to pay creditors, landlords, and employees, have been filed against Kenney and his companies in at least nine states.

== Restaurants ==
=== Closed ===
- Matthew's, New York City (1993–2001)
- Mezze, New York City (1995–2002)
- Monzu, SoHo, New York City (1997–1999)
- Cafe M, Stanhope Hotel, New York City (1998–)
- Commune, New York City (1999–2003)
- Canteen, SoHo, New York City (1999–2001)
- Commissary, New York City (2001–2003)
- Pure Food and Wine, New York City (2003)
- Free Foods NYC, W. 45th Street, New York City (2007–2014)
- Free Foods NYC, 52nd Street, New York City (?–2009)
- Arata, Belfast, Maine (2015–2016)
- Tamazul, Oklahoma City (2012–2014)
- The Gothic, Belfast, Maine (2013–2016)
- M.A.K.E., Santa Monica, California (2012)
- The White Lotus, Miami, Florida (2014)
- New Deli, Venice, California (2018–2021)
- Althea, Chicago, Illinois (2018–unknown)
- Heirloom, Lower East Side, New York
- Cafe 118, Winter Park, Florida
- XYST, New York City, (2017–unknown)
- Blue/Green juice bars, various locations in New York City and one in Darien, Connecticut
- Sestina, New York City, (2020–2022)
- Liora, Baltimore, Maryland (2021–2023)
- Double Zero, Baltimore, Maryland (2021–2023)
- Double Zero, Venice, California (2019–2023)
- Hungry Angelina, Long Beach, California (2020–2022)
- Plantpub, Boston, MA(2022–2023)
- Essence Cuisine Shoreditch, London (2017–2023)
- Sestina, Culver City, California (2020–2023)
- Plant Food and Wine, Venice, California, (2015–2024)
- Make Out, Culver City, California (2015–2024)
- Oliver's of Montecito, Montecito (2017–2024)
- Baia, Hayes Valley, San Francisco, California (2020–2024)
- Bar Verde/Double Zero, New York City, (2017–2026)

== Awards ==
- 1994: Food & Wine, Best New Chef,

== Published works ==
- Kenney, Matthew; Gugino, Sam (1997). Matthew Kenney's Mediterranean Cooking: Great Flavors for the American Kitchen. San Francisco, CA: Chronicle Books. ISBN 9780811814430.
- Kenney, Matthew; Schwartz, Joan (2003). Big City Cooking: Recipes for a Fast-Paced World. San Francisco, CA: Chronicle Books. ISBN 9780811832229.
- Kenney, Matthew; Melngailis, Sarma (2005). Raw Food for the Real World: 100 Recipes to Get the Glow. Regan Books. ISBN 0060793554.
- Kenney, Matthew (2008). Everyday Raw. Gibbs Smith. ISBN 9781423602071.
- Kenney, Matthew (2009). Entertaining in the Raw. Gibbs Smith. ISBN 9781423609612.
- Kenney, Matthew (2010). Everyday Raw Desserts. Gibbs Smith. ISBN 978-1-4236-0599-7.
- Kenney, Matthew (2011). Everyday Raw Express: Recipes in 30 Minutes or Less. Gibbs Smith. ISBN 9781423618928.
- Kenney, Matthew (2012). Raw Chocolate. Everyday Raw. ISBN 9781423621065.
- Baird, Meredith; Kenney, Matthew (2013). Everyday Raw Detox. Gibbs Smith. ISBN 9781423630166.
- Kenney, Matthew (2013). Everyday Raw Gourmet. Gibbs Smith. ISBN 9781423634805.
- Kenney, Matthew; Baird, Meredith; Winegard, Scott (2014). Plant Food. Everyday Raw. Gibbs Smith. ISBN 9781423630630.
- Kenney, Matthew (2015). Cooked Raw: How One Celebrity Chef Risked Everything to Change the Way We Eat. Workman Publishing. ISBN 9781939629975.
- Kenney, Matthew (2016). The 90-Day Raw Food Diet: The Simple Day-by-Day Way to Improve Health, Heighten Energy, and Get the Glow!. Familius LLC. ISBN 9781942934073.
- Kenney, Matthew (2017). PLANTLAB. Regan Arts. ISBN 9781682450888.
