= Pusas =

Traditional appetiser or snack eaten with alcohol in Sabah, Malaysia

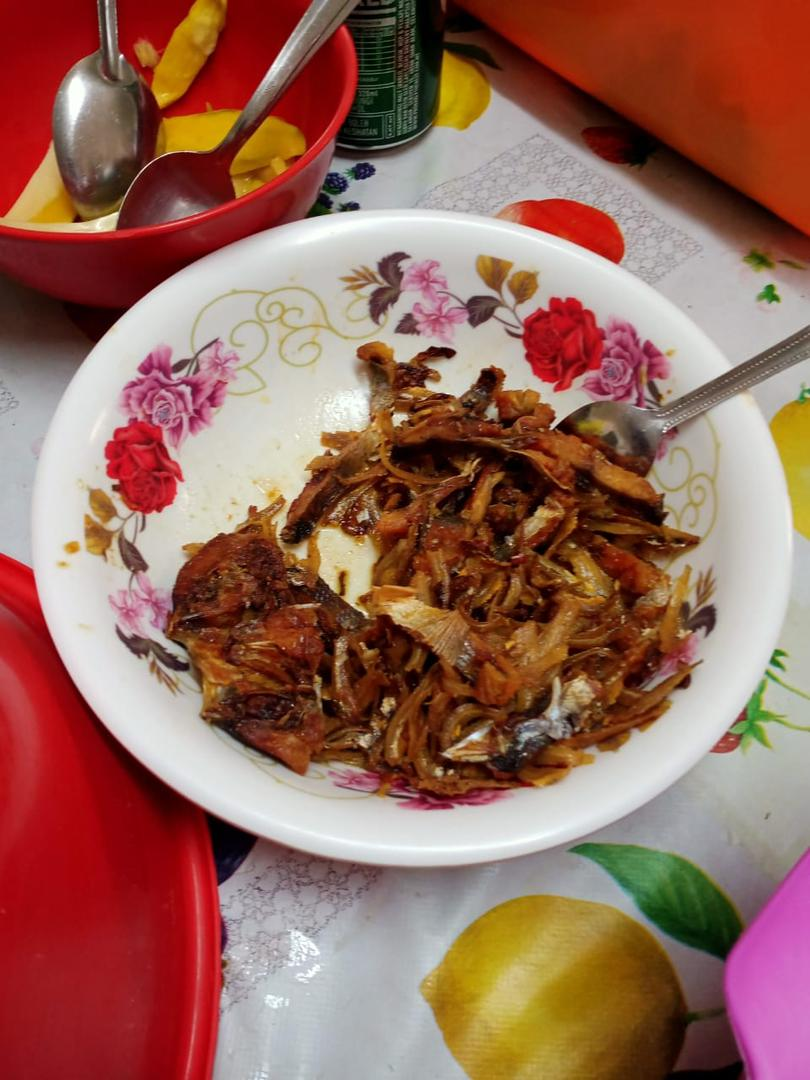
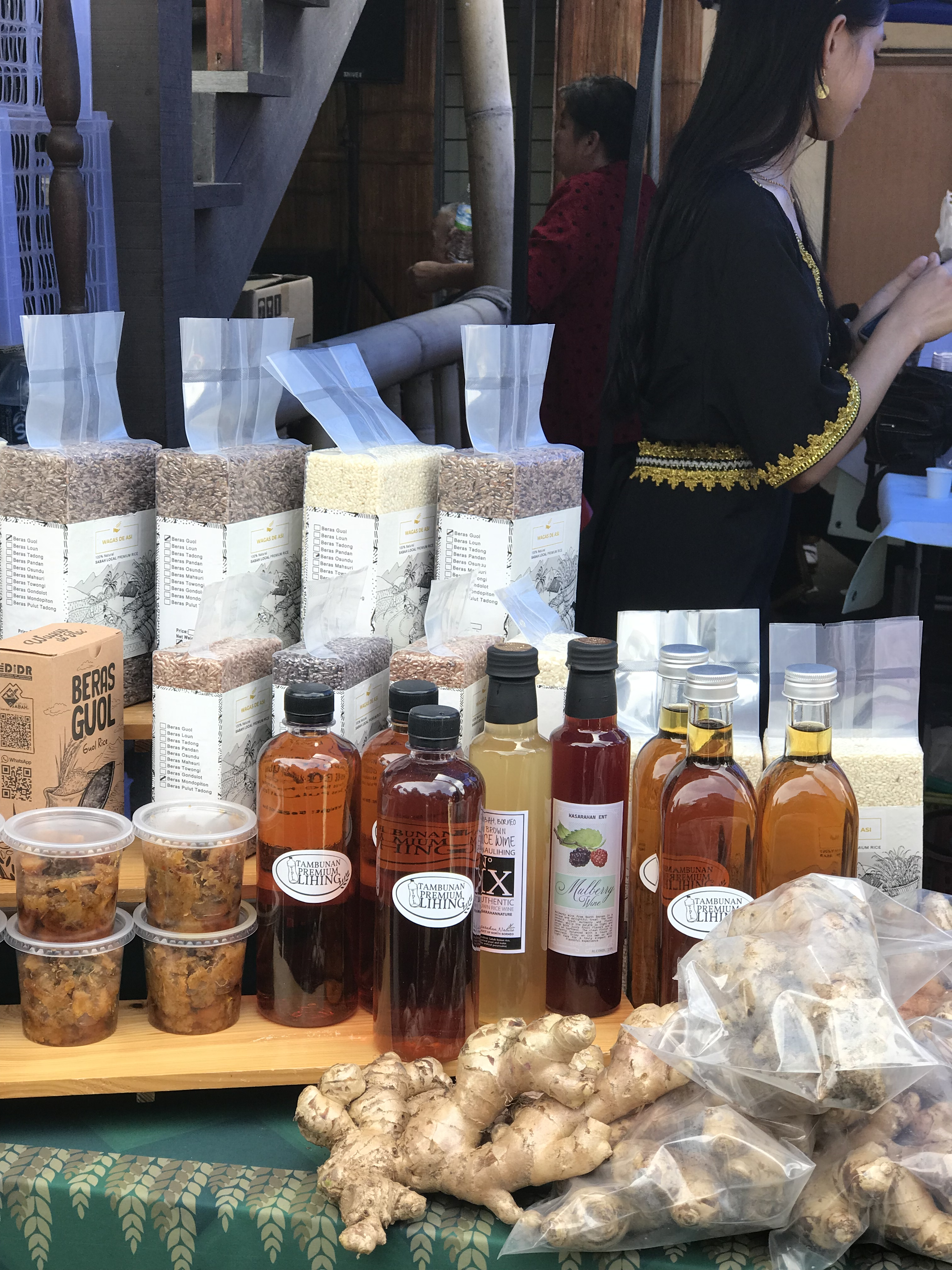
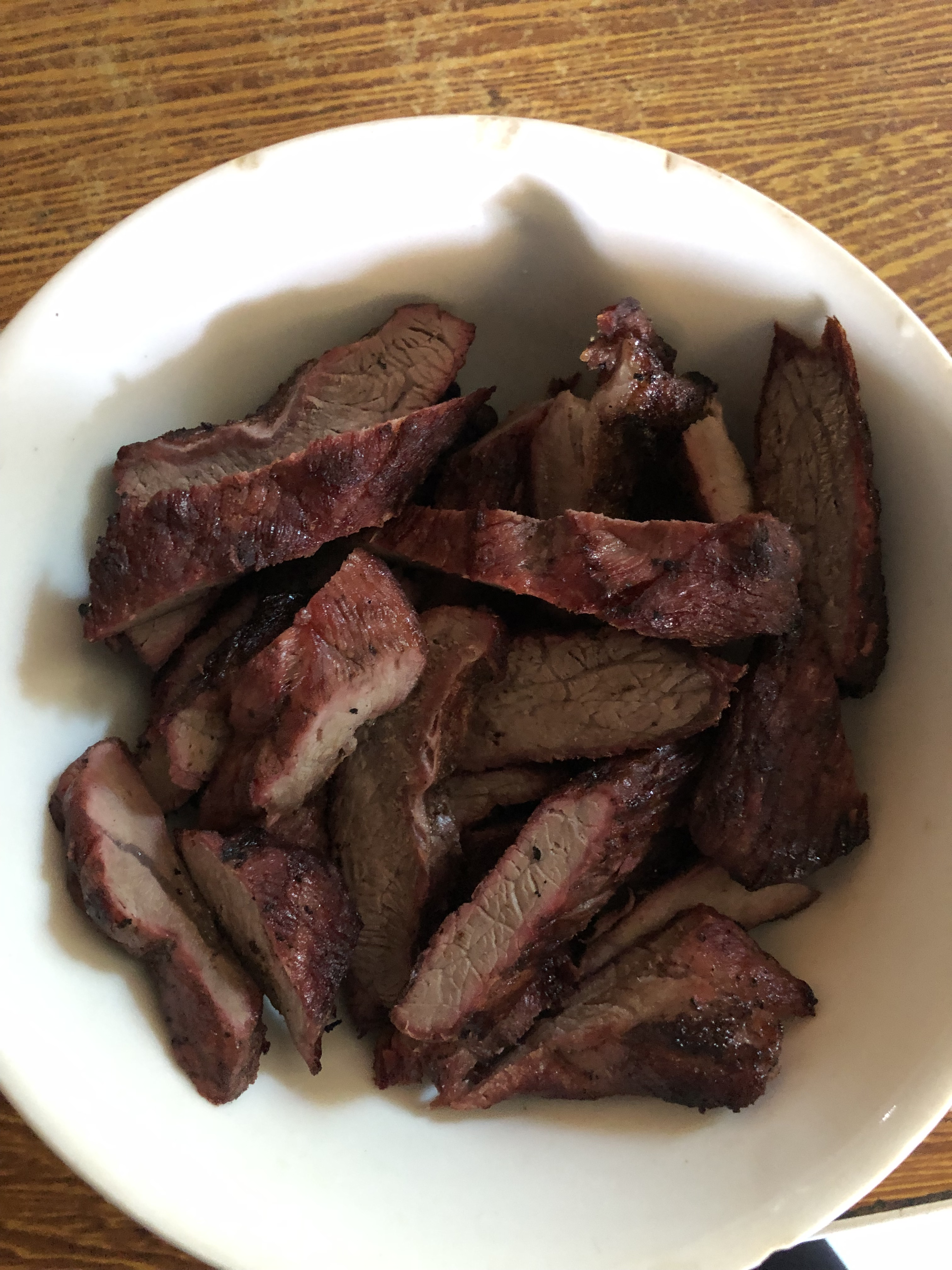
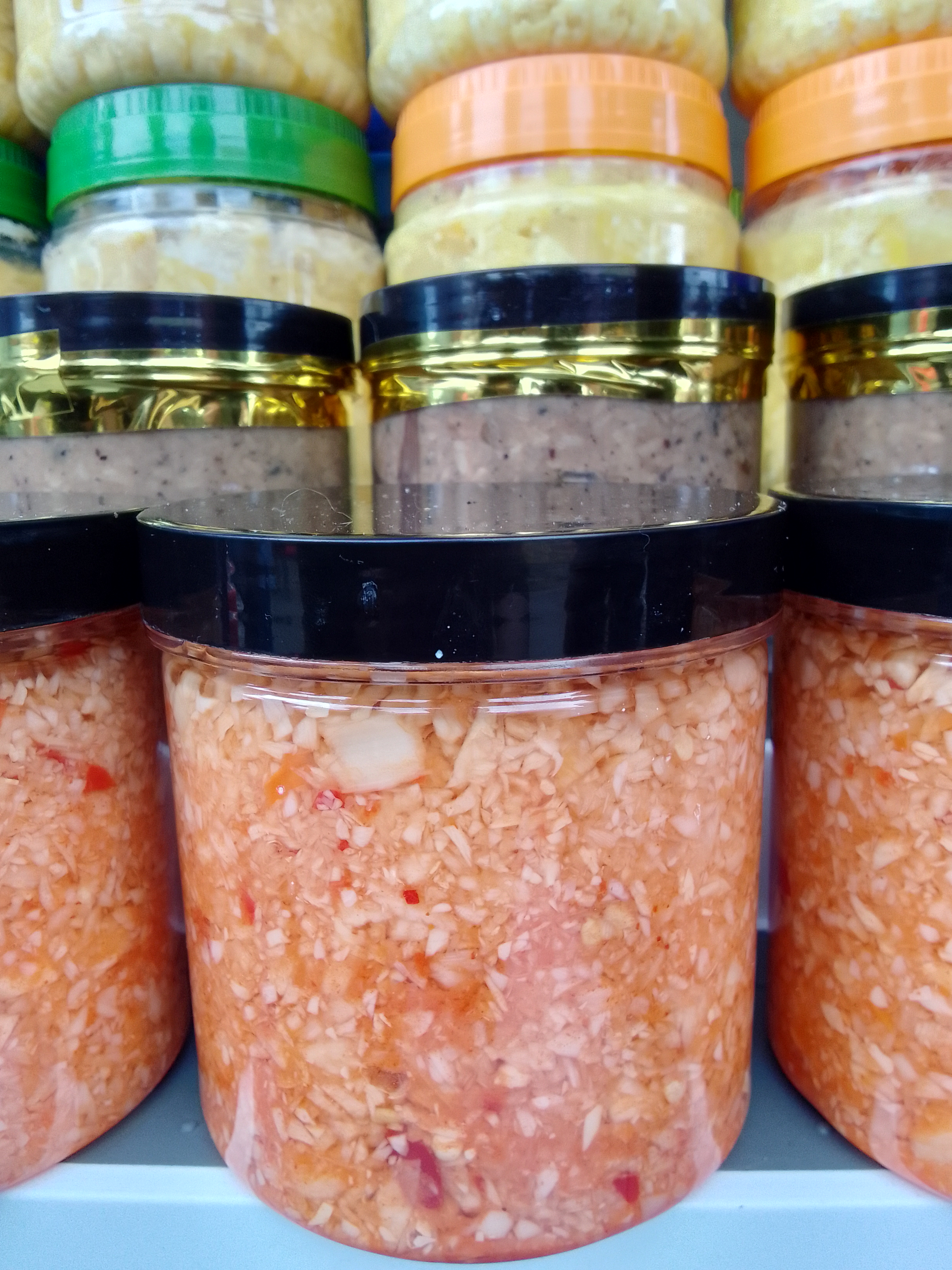
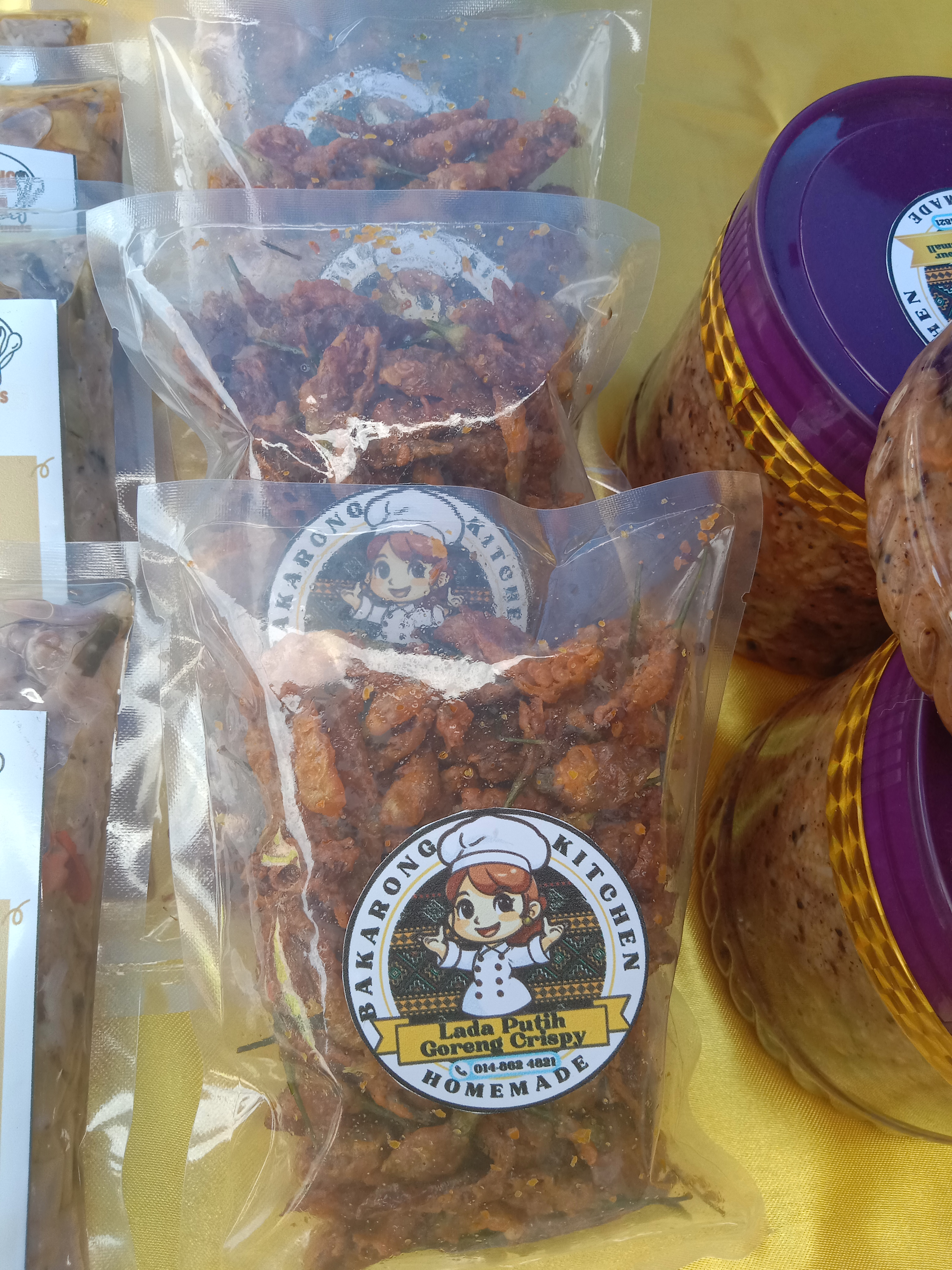
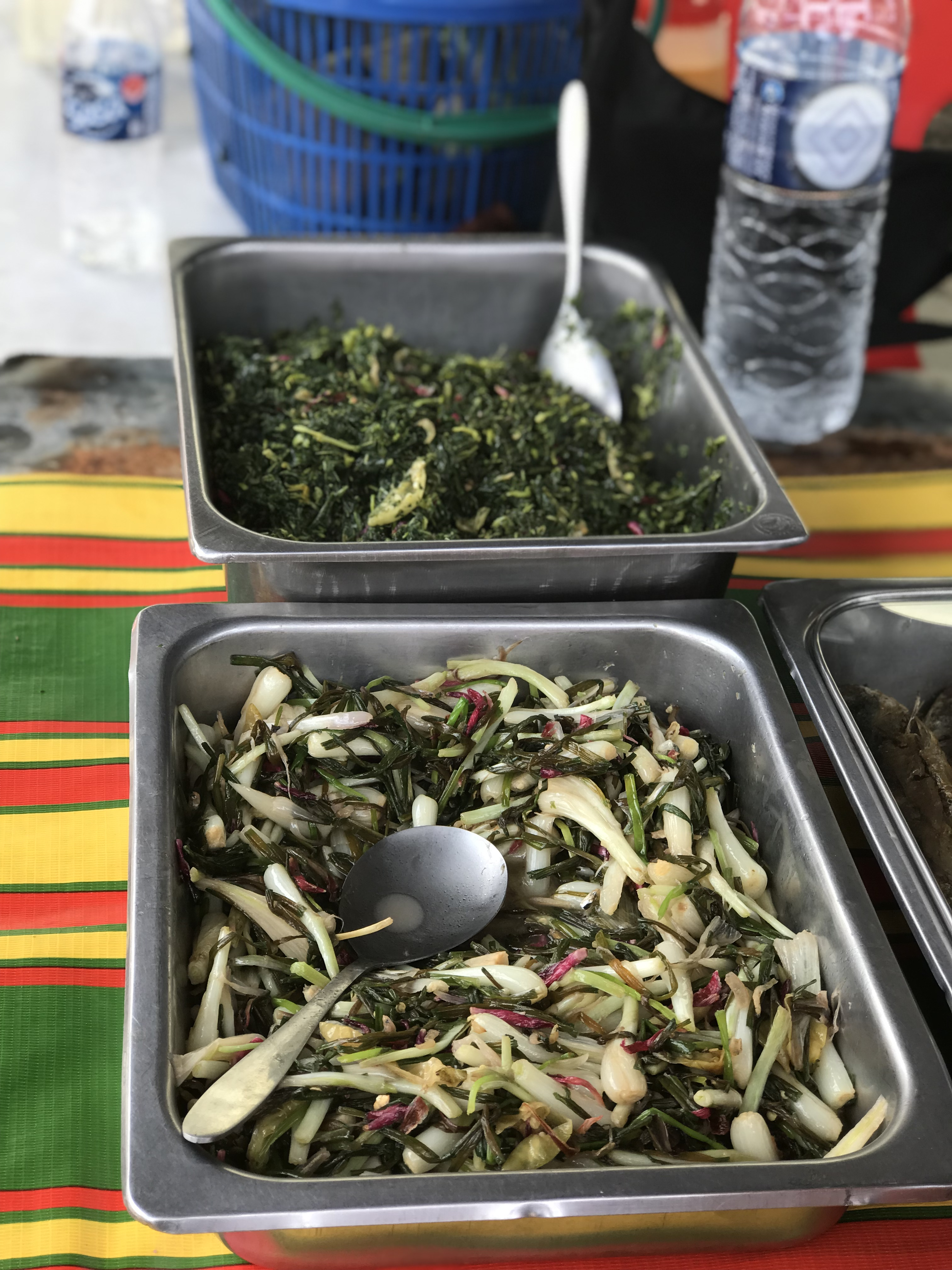
- Various types of pusas in Sabah
- Course: Appetiser or snack
- Place of origin: Malaysia
- Region or state: Sabah
- Created by: Kadazan-Dusun and Rungus
- Serving temperature: Hot or cold
- Main ingredients: Various

Pusas are appetisers or snacks of certain types of food among the Kadazan-Dusun and Rungus in Sabahan cuisine within Malaysia. The Dusunic community within Sabah is known for its certain types of snack foods accompanied by traditional alcoholic drinks such as montoku, lihing, talak, tapai and various commercial beers.

== Etymology ==
It is a local term in the Kadazan-Dusun language referring to a snack or small dish enjoyed with alcoholic beverages, typically consists of grilled food, smoked meat, or finger food.

== Categories of pusas ==
Foods that are classified as pusas usually have a salty, spicy, or sour taste which is to stimulate the appetite while drinking alcoholic beverages. Among the common types of pusas of the Kadazan-Dusun including:

- Tender shoots and meat: Sweet potato shoots cooked with chicken or fish.
- Salted fish: Dried fish fried with onions and chillies.
- Butod (Rhynchophorus vulneratus larvae): Sago worm.
- Sinalau: Pork or other fried crispy smoked meat.
- Tuhau: Forest plants that are sliced and mixed with chillies and vinegar.

== See also ==
- Anju (food) – Korean term for food eaten with alcohol
- Hors d'oeuvre – Small dish served before main meal
- Kap klaem – Thai term for food consumed with alcohol
- Meze – Small dish in Middle Eastern and Balkan cuisines
- Pu pu platter – Tray of American Chinese cuisine
- Sakana – Japanese snacks, eaten with alcohol
- Tapas – Appetiser or snack in Spanish and international cuisine
- Zakuski – Russian term for appetizers served before meals
