= Anne Quatrano =

American chef (born 1959)

- Born: January 31, 1959
- Education: University of Vermont; California Culinary Academy
- Spouse: Clifford Harrison
- Culinary career
- Current restaurant(s): Bacchanalia, Star Provisions, Floataway Café
- Award(s) won: 1995 Food & Wine Best New Chef; 2003 James Beard Award, Best Chef: Southeast
- Website: www.starprovisions.com

Anne Quatrano is a restaurateur in Atlanta, Georgia.

== Early life and career ==
Quatrano was raised in Fairfield, Connecticut, but spent summers on her mother's family farm near Cartersville, Georgia. After graduating from the University of Vermont, Quatrano worked in restaurant management before enrolling at the California Culinary Academy in San Francisco.

In Culinary school, Quatrano was influenced by the California cuisine of the San Francisco Bay Area, and she apprenticed for Judy Rodgers. She also met her husband and business partner, Clifford Harrison, a fellow culinary school student.

After culinary school, Quatrano and Harrison moved to New York City, where they worked together in several restaurants, including Le Petite Ferme, Grolier, and Conrad's Bar & Grill.

== Summerland, Bacchanalia, and Star Provisions ==
In 1992, Quatrano and Harrison moved to Georgia, taking ownership of Quatrano's family farm, named Summerland. In 1993, they opened their own restaurant, Bacchanalia, in the Buckhead district of Atlanta, serving contemporary American cuisine with ingredients from the Summerland farm.

In 1995, Quatrano and Harrison were recognized among Food & Wine magazine's Best New Chefs.

In 1998, Quatrano and Harrison opened a more casual restaurant, Floataway Café, in a former industrial neighborhood of the same name in northeast Atlanta.

In 1999, Bacchanalia moved to a new location in the Westside Provisions District of Atlanta, and Quatrano and Harrison opened an adjacent grocery store, Star Provisions. Bacchanalia and Star Provisions moved to a new building a mile away in 2017.

In 2003, Quatrano and Harrison won the James Beard Award for Best Chef: Southeast.

== Other ventures ==
In 2013, Quatrano published a cookbook, Summerland, with chapters dedicated to seasonal celebrations, from Thanksgiving to engagement tea parties.

Quatrano is a member of the James Beard Foundation Board of Trustees, and in 2018, she was the chair of the James Beard Awards Committee that made changes to the voting process and encouraged voters to consider whether the nominees deserve to be role models.
