= 42 Grams =

Defunct restaurant in Chicago, Illinois, U.S.

- Interactive map of 42 Grams

Restaurant information
- Established: January 10, 2014
- Closed: June 4, 2017
- Owners: Jake Bickelhaupt; Alexa Welsh
- Manager: Alexa Welsh
- Head chef: Jake Bickelhaupt
- Location: 4662 N. Broadway, Chicago, Illinois, 60640, United States
- Coordinates: 41°58′1.2″N 87°39′31.4″W

42 Grams was a restaurant in Chicago, Illinois, United States. Named after the notional weight of a human soul and the contributions of its two (originally married) owners, head chef Jake Bickelhaupt and general manager Alexa Welsh, the restaurant received two Michelin stars after only ten months in operation, and retained this distinction until its closure in 2017.

== History ==
The restaurant opened in January 2014, to near-immediate acclaim. Bickelhaupt and Welsh divorced in January 2017 and initially planned to continue the restaurant through its lease expiration in November, but on June 4, Bickelhaupt assaulted Welsh, leading a diner to call police. Later that evening, Bickelhaupt tweeted an announcement that the restaurant was closing, effective immediately.

== Reception ==
Time Out Chicago rated the restaurant 5 out of 5 stars, less than a month after its opening. Phil Vettel of The Chicago Tribune praised "Bickelhaupt['s] progressive cooking, and Welsh, the host presence who gives voice to each dish her husband sends out." The Michelin Guide awarded it two stars, commending "not only a concept but also an execution that is unique".

=== Documentary ===
After attending a dinner party hosted by Bickelhaupt and Welsh, documentary filmmaker Jack C. Newell was inspired to film Bickelhaupt's food prep and presentation, following the couple as they planned and opened 42 Grams, through its first year, and to its recognition as a Michelin-starred restaurant. The resulting documentary, also titled 42 Grams, was released in January 2018 and earned praise as a "fitting tribute" to the recently closed restaurant, even as it left the implosion of both restaurant and relationships to closing titles.

== See also ==
- List of defunct restaurants of the United States
- List of Michelin-starred restaurants in Chicago
