= Oyster Oyster =

Restaurant in Washington, D.C., U.S.

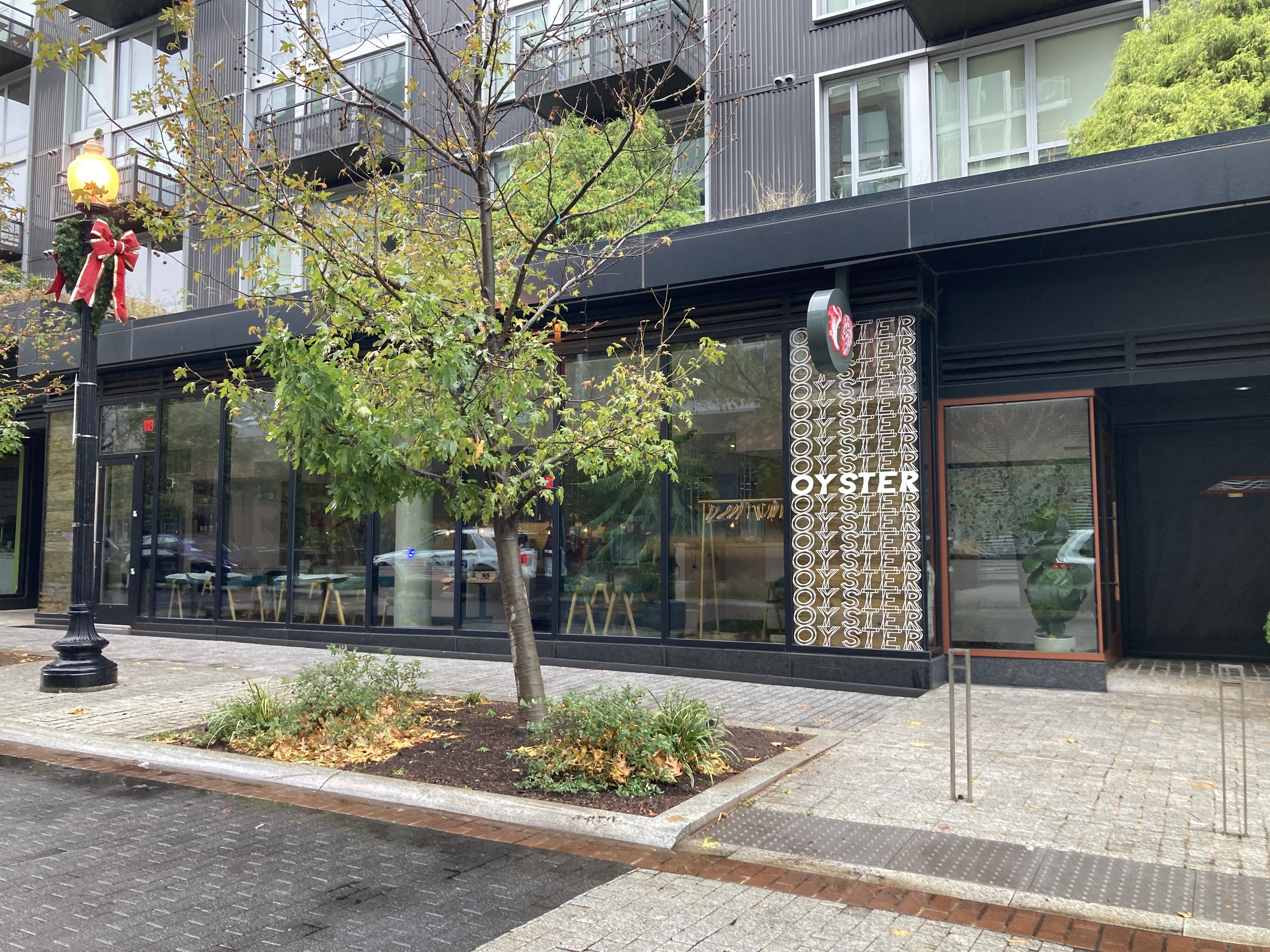
- The restaurant's exterior in 2024
- Interactive map of Oyster Oyster

Restaurant information
- Established: 2020
- Owner: Rob Rubba
- Chef: Rob Rubba
- Food type: American
- Rating: (Michelin Guide)
- Location: 1440 8th Street NW, Washington, D.C., 20001, United States
- Coordinates: 38°54′33.3″N 77°1′23.3″W
- Website: oysteroysterdc.com

Oyster Oyster is a restaurant by chef Rob Rubba, serving plant-based, American cuisine in Shaw, Washington, D.C. The restaurant has received a Michelin star.

== Description ==
The tasting menu has included various mushrooms, oyster dishes, and vegetables.

== Reception ==
The restaurant has received a Michelin star. Rubba received a James Beard Foundation Award in the Outstanding Chef category for his work at Oyster Oyster. In 2023, Eater Washington, D.C. and the Washingtonian included Oyster Oyster in lists of the metropolitan area's 38 "essential" restaurants and 100 "very best" eateries in the city.

In 2024, Oyster Oyster was awarded the Michelin star for another year. In addition, the restaurant received a "Michelin Green Star", a new rating which recognizes the commitment to environmentally-friendly practices.

== See also ==
- List of Michelin starred restaurants in Washington, D.C.
