= Pure Food and Wine =

Vegan restaurant in New York City

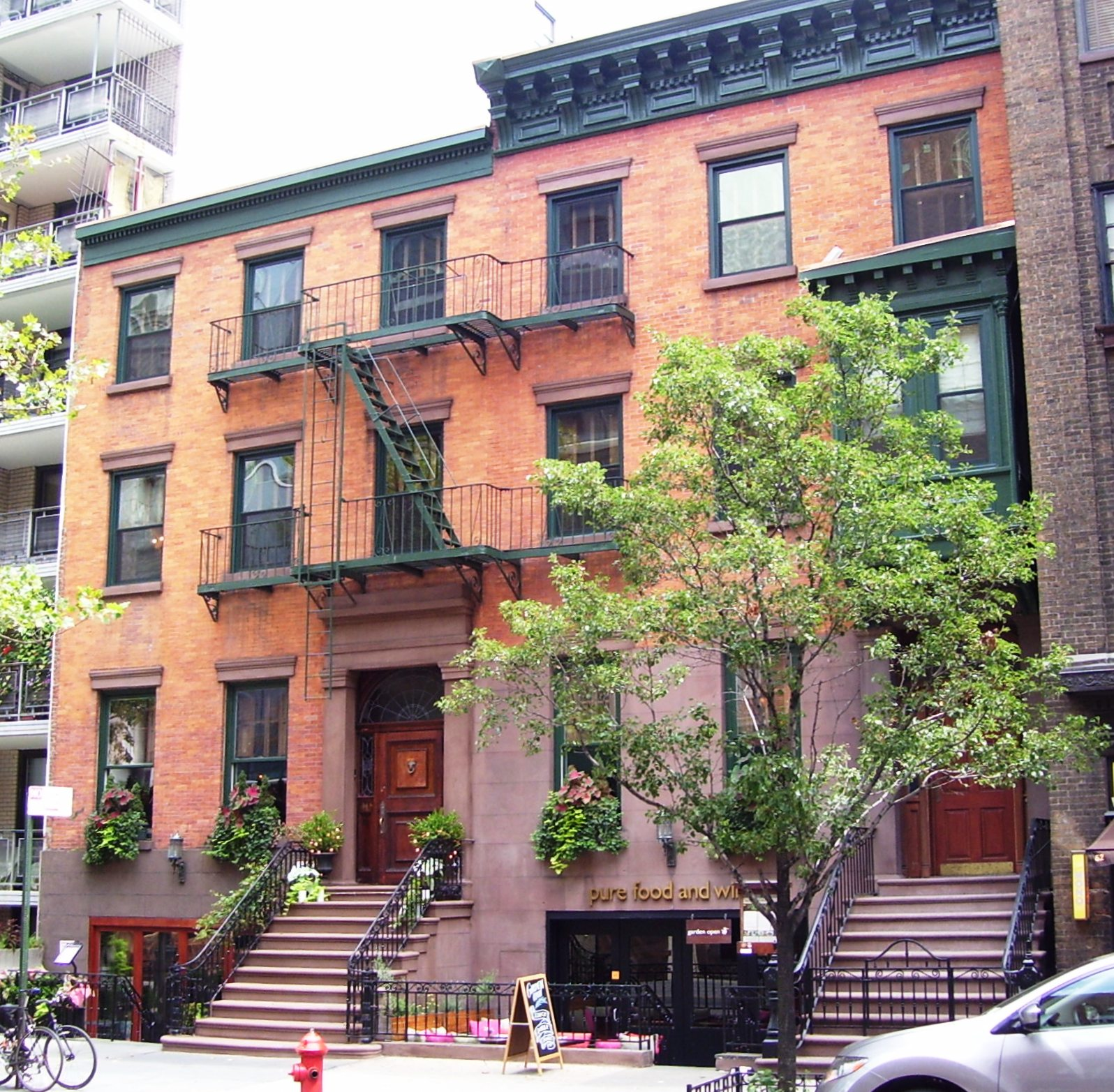
- The restaurant's exterior in 2010
- Interactive map of Pure Food and Wine

Restaurant information
- Established: June 2004
- Closed: 2016
- Owner: Sarma Melngailis
- Chef: Matthew Kenney
- Location: 54 Irving Place, New York, New York, 10003, United States
- Coordinates: 40°44′10″N 73°59′14″W

Pure Food and Wine was a raw food and vegan restaurant co-founded by Sarma Melngailis and chef Matthew Kenney. The restaurant opened in June 2004 at 54 Irving Place in Manhattan. It closed in 2016. It is the subject of the documentary Bad Vegan: Fame. Fraud. Fugitives.

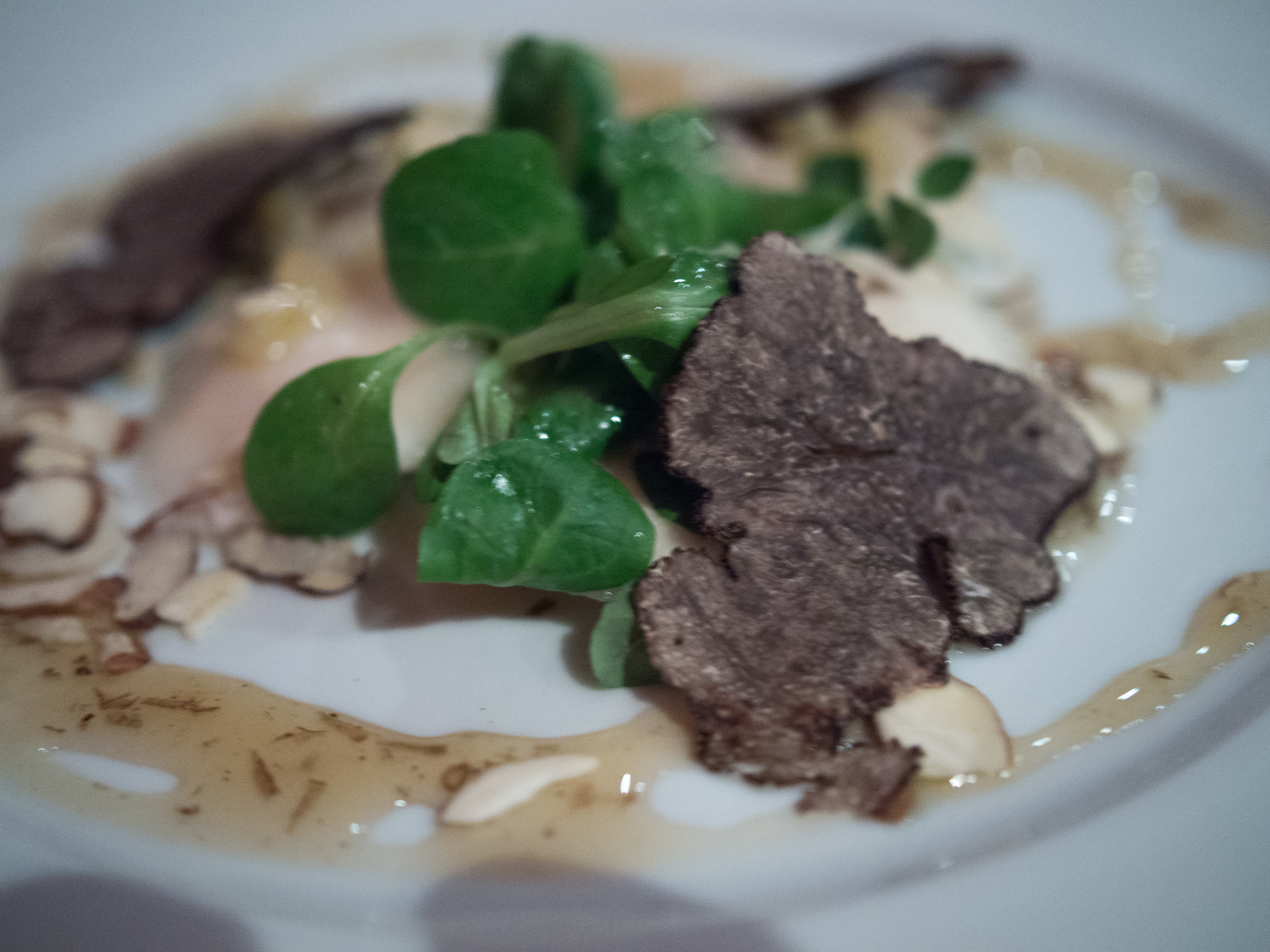
Pear Ravioli

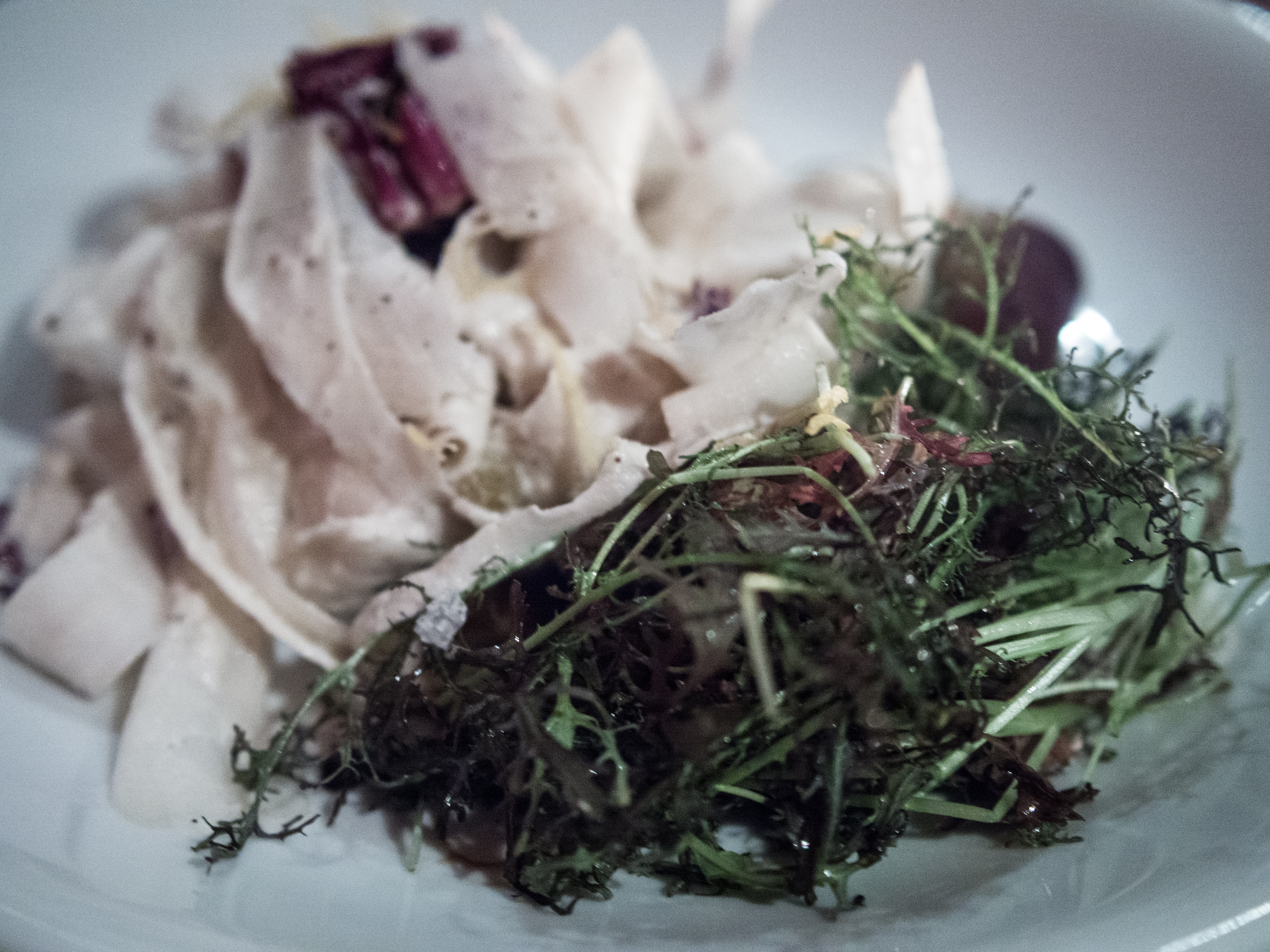
Salsify Noodles with Radicchio and Figs

== See also ==
- List of defunct restaurants of the United States
- List of restaurants in New York City
- List of vegetarian and vegan restaurants
