= Anne Kearney =

American chef

- Born: June 18, 1967; Dayton, Ohio
- Education: Greater Cincinnati Culinary Arts Academy
- Culinary career
- Cooking style: American interpretation of Provencal bistro fare
- Current restaurant(s): Peristyle - New Orleans (Sold in 2004) Rue Dumaine - Dayton (Opened November 2007, closed July 2017) Oak & Ola - Tampa (Opened February 2019)

Anne Kearney is an American chef and restaurateur. In 2002 she won a James Beard Foundation award as "Southeast Regional Best Chef".

With a background at Bistro at the Maison de Ville and Peristyle with John Neal and as line cook and culinary assistant at Emeril Lagasse's Emeril's, she was given the opportunity to purchase Peristyle from Neal's estate in 1995. Kearney's food is an American interpretation of Provençal bistro fare.

== Early life ==
She was born in Ohio. Kearney earned her toque at the Greater Cincinnati Culinary Arts Academy.

== Career ==
Five years after graduation, she moved to New Orleans, where she worked at Mr. B's bistro, then at Bistro at the Maison de Ville hotel under John Neal. In 1991, she followed Neal to Peristyle. After Neal died, the 27-year-old Kearney bought Peristyle from his estate.

Kearney credits her stint as sous-chef at Peristyle for her classic French cooking techniques. She worked for three years with Emeril Lagasse, where she cooked on the line, developed cookbook recipes, and researched and wrote Emeril's television show scripts. Kearney returned to Peristyle as its chef and proprietor shortly after Neal died.

In 2004, Kearney sold Peristyle and moved back to Ohio. She cultivated and worked on Two Small Tomatoes, her all-natural organic garden. During two cold winters, she taught culinary school at Midwest Culinary School (Cincinnati) to stay connected to the food world.

On November 27, 2007, Kearney opened Rue Dumaine in Washington Township, Ohio. Named after the French Quarter Street on which Peristyle had been located. Rue Dumaine won awards and recognition for their food.

In July 2017, following the sale of the property where her restaurant was located, Kearney closed Rue Dumaine to pursue other culinary adventures.

In February 2019, along with four partners, she opened Oak & Ola (founding chef/partner), a "Euro-American" restaurant located in Tampa, Florida. She expanded her love of French ingredients to the surrounding Western European countries of Italy, Germany, Spain, England, Belgium, and beyond.

== Recognition ==
- 2012: James Beard Foundation Award Finalist: Best Chef, Great Lakes Region
- 2011: OpenTable Diners' Choice Awards
- 2010: Zagat "Extraordinary to Perfection"
- 2002: James Beard Foundation Award Winner: Best Chef, Southeast Region
- 2001: James Beard Foundation Award Finalist: Best Chef, Southeast Region
- 1999: James Beard Foundation Award Finalist: Best Chef, Southeast Region
- 1998: Food & Wine pictured Kearney on the cover of its "10 Best New Chefs in America" issue
- 1998: Gourmet included Peristyle among its Top Food in New Orleans selections
- 1997: Nominee for Gallo of Sonoma Rising Star Chef Award
