= Julia Sullivan =

Tennessee chef

Julia Sullivan is a chef and co-owner of Nashville’s Henrietta Red restaurant, along with Strategic Hospitality Group, as well as Judith Tavern in Sewanee, Tennessee.

== Biography ==
Sullivan is a Nashville native who attended University School of Nashville, Tulane University and the Culinary Institute of America.

== Career ==
The Wall Street Journal described Sullivan's food as "at once modern and cozy".

Moving to New York City after graduating from Culinary Institute of America, Sullivan worked for several restaurants such as Per Se (restaurant) where she worked under Thomas Keller, and Blue Hill at Stone Barns. She then moved to Franny's restaurant in New York.

In Nashville, Sullivan opened the restaurant Henrietta Red in the Germantown region after two years of work. Her business partner is Allie Poindexter who also serves as the sommelier. The restaurant is also known for its oysters, and has been profiled in papers such as The New York Times. She also runs The Party Line catering company, which increased its delivery and catering business in March 2020 in response to increased demand due to the COVID-19 pandemic. Later, as the pandemic progressed, Sullivan worked to get her employees funding from the federal grants meant to help workers during the pandemic.

Sullivan was one of the female chefs profiled by Vogue in 2017 in an article about changing the culture of restaurants into friendlier places to work.

== Awards and honors ==
Sullivan was named, by the Robb Report as one of the Best Young Chefs in America. In 2018 she was named one of Food & Wine's Best New Chefs. In 2020 Sullivan was nominated for Best Chef in the southeast by the James Beard Award committee.

Sullivan's restaurant, Henrietta Red, was one of 50 finalists in Bon Appetit's 2017 list of best new restaurants and it made the 2018 list of best new restaurants that is compiled by James Beard.
