= Misti Norris =

American chef

- Born: North Carolina
- Occupations: Chef, restaurateur
- Known for: Food fermentation
- Culinary career
- Current restaurants
- Stepchild; Far Out; Rainbow Cat
- Previous restaurants
- Petra & the Beast
- Award
- James Beard Foundation Taste America

Misti Norris is an American chef and restaurateur based in Dallas, Texas. A James Beard Award winner, she is known for minimizing food waste and innovative dishes.

== Early life and education ==
Norris was born in North Carolina and grew up in Houston, Texas. She describes growing up in a "Cajun home" and recalls being inspired by her grandmother's homemade boudin balls. Norris trained as a gymnast and competed internationally, eventually deciding "it wasn't for her" and got her first job cooking in a retirement home. In college, she studied anatomy and fashion design before going to culinary school.

== Career ==
After college, Norris worked in multiple kitchens throughout the Dallas area. In March of 2018, she opened her first restaurant, Petra & the Beast, repurposing the building of a 1930s gas station. The restaurant was credited for its use of fermented foods and whole-animal butchery. The restaurant later moved to a site in the Lakewood neighborhood of Dallas. Petra & the Beast was named Best New Restaurant by Esquire and included in Bon Appétit’s top 50 restaurants for 2018.

In 2022, Norris opened up the restaurant Stepchild in Dallas, serving French Cajun food as a tribute to her father. After Petra & the Beast closed in late 2024, Norris became culinary director of Far Out, also located in Dallas. PaperCity magazine called her menu offering a "delightful adventure". She also runs a restaurant called Rainbow Cat located within a Dallas bar, described as a permanent pop-up. The magazine Texas Monthly named Rainbow Cat as one of the "ten best new restaurants" in Texas.

== Awards and honors ==
- In 2019, Norris was named a Best New Chef by Food & Wine
- In 2024, Norris was a finalist for Best Chef Texas
- In 2026, Norris was named to the James Beard Foundation Taste America series
