= Matthew Kammerer =

American chef

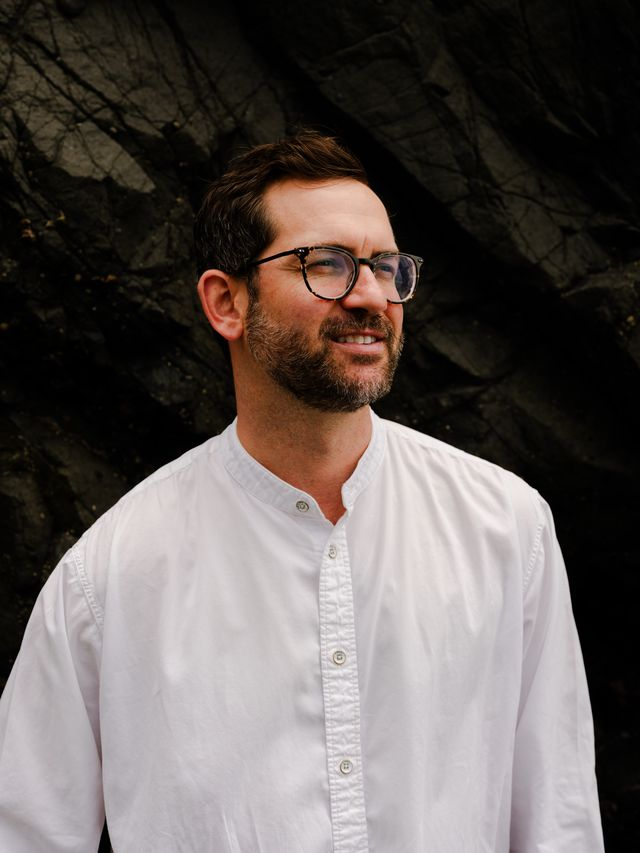
- Culinary career
- Cooking style: Californian cuisine
- Current restaurant: Harbor House Inn
- Award(s) won: 2023 James Beard Awards Semi finalist Best Chef: California 2022 James Beard Awards Semi finalist Best Chef: California 2020 James Beard Awards Semi-Finalist Rising Star Chef of the Year 2020 Michelin Guide California Green Star 2019 Michelin Guide California One Star 2019 Food & Wine Best New Chef 2019 James Beard Awards Semi-Finalist Best Chef of the West

Matthew Kammerer is an American chef and the executive chef of the Harbor House Inn in Elk, California where he has earned two Michelin stars and a Michelin Green Star. In 2019, he was named a Food & Wine Best New Chef, and he has been a multi-time James Beard Award semi-finalist.

== Biography ==
Kammerer grew up in West Long Branch, on the New Jersey shore, where early experiences dining out with his family sparked an interest in food and restaurants. He began working in kitchens as a teenager, starting as a dishwasher and later gaining basic culinary skills as a prep cook. He enrolled at Johnson & Wales University in Rhode Island, where he studied culinary arts.

== Career ==
His early professional experience included positions in Boston and extended training stints in Australia, where he learned garden-to-plate practices. He also worked in Michelin- kitchens RyuGin in Japan and In de Wulf in Belgium, gaining experience in precise technique and seafood preparation. Kammerer subsequently moved to San Francisco, where he worked for three years as Executive Sous Chef at Saison from 2015–2018, then a three-Michelin-star restaurant.

Kammerer later sought a remote coastal location aligned with his interest in hyper-local, nature-centered cuisine. After considering sites in the Pacific Northwest and California, he selected the Mendocino Coast and joined the Harbor House Inn in Elk, California. The historic inn, originally built in 1916, reopened in 2018 with Kammerer serving as executive chef.

Kammerer received one Michelin star in 2019 and subsequently two Michelin stars beginning in 2021. He has also been awarded a Michelin Green Star.

Kammerer has additionally appeared in media features and culinary programs, participating on the Apple TV documentary series Knife Edge: Chasing Michelin Stars.
