= Kris Yenbamroong =

Chef and author (born 1982)

- คริส เย็นบำรุง
- Born: 1982 (age 43–44); Los Angeles, California, United States
- Education: New York University (BFA)
- Spouse: Sarah St. Lifer (m. 2016)

Kris Yenbamroong (Thai: คริส เย็นบำรุง) is a Thai-American chef and cookbook author. Yenbamroong owns the 3 Night + Market restaurants in Los Angeles and 1 in Las Vegas, serving Thai cuisine in the style of kap klaem, the Thai term for "drinking food".

Born and raised in Los Angeles, Yenbamroong studied film at New York University Tisch School of the Arts. He took over his parents' Thai restaurant, Talésai, before opening the first Night + Market on West Hollywood's Sunset Strip in 2010. He was named Food & Wine Magazine's Best New Chef in 2016.

== Restaurants ==
- Night + Market WeHo (Opened 2010)
- Night + Market Song (Opened 2014)
- Night + Market Sahm (Opened 2018)
- Night + Market Vegas (Opened 2021)

== Publications ==
- Night + Market: Delicious Thai Food to Facilitate Drinking and Fun-Having Amongst Friends (2017)
