= Marc Orfaly =

American chef

Marc Orfaly is a Boston based chef, restaurateur and the Culinary Director of the Navy Yard Hospitality Group.

== Personal life ==
Orfaly grew up in Brookline, Massachusetts and is a graduate of Johnson & Wales University.

He comes from an Armenian family. His mother was a pianist, and his father was an audio technician.

He began cooking at the age of 15 to earn some money, but over time, he developed a passion for cooking and developed a professional career in it.

He is married to Kerri Foley, who was co-owner / general manager at Pigalle

== Career ==
=== Early Career & Training ===
- He started his career in Boston by working under the famous chef Todd English at “Olives”.
- In the mid-1990s, he moved to Los Angeles and worked under chefs like Joachim Splichal at Patina, and with Mark Peel & Nancy Silverton at Campanile.
- After gaining huge experience in restaurant work, he returned to Boston in 1999 and worked with chef Barbara Lynch at No. 9 Park.

=== Restaurants founded ===
- In 2001, he opened his first restaurant, Pigalle. It was a Persian-style bistro in Boston’s Theater District.
- He also opened Ran Marco (Italian restaurant in the north end of Boston), and later was consulted on many projects like Peking Tom’s (Asian restaurant), and the Beehive (a music venue restaurant ).
- Later, under Navy Yard Hospitality Group, he was involved in seafood-oriented restaurants like Reelhouse in Boston.

=== Recent & Current Role ===
- As the Culinary Director at Navy Yard Hospitality Group, Orfaly handled multiple restaurants, including Pier 6, Mija, ReelHouse, etc.
- In 2018, He represented Massachusetts in the Great American Seafood Cook-Off and won second place for his “Deconstructed New England Clam Bake.”
- In 2024, he organised events featuring Armenian-influenced cuisine, celebrating his Armenian roots.

== Honors and awards ==
Orfaly was nominated for a James Beard Foundation Award multiple times (Nominee, Best Chefs in America 2005, 2006, 2007, 2008, 2009 and 2010)

Food & Wine named him one of the best new chefs of 2004.

In 2018, He took second place at the great american seafood cook-off.
