= Jason Vincent =

Jason Vincent is American, national award-winning chef and co-owner of the restaurant Giant, located in Chicago, Illinois.

== Early years ==
Vincent grew up in Cleveland, Ohio and first became interested in cooking when he was a dishwasher at a local Italian restaurant. He started cooking at 15 at a pizza restaurant in Cleveland. He attended the Culinary Institute of America. When he graduated, he worked at the Michelin three-starred restaurant Arzak in San Sebastian, Spain.

== Career ==
Leaving Spain, Vincent worked as a line cook at the James Beard Award winner Fore Street restaurant in Portland, Maine. In 2005, he settled in Chicago where he met Jason Hammel, chef-owner of Lula Café. Vincent and Hammel worked together for four years, when Hammel raised the idea of opening another restaurant. Together, they opened Nightwood with a menu that changed daily with fresh ingredients. Under Vincent, Nightwood earned the Michelin Guide's Bib Gourmand Award and was recognized on Bon Appetit magazine's "10 Best Dishes of 2010" list. Vincent left Nightwood in 2014 to spend more time with his family. In 2016, he opened Giant in Logan Square with Ben Lustbader and Josh Perlman. The 1400 square foot restaurant serves American food. The Chicago Tribune rated one of their dishes as part of their list of the best foods of 2016. Zagat listed them in their December 2016 article entitled "Most Important Restaurant Openings of 2016 in 15 U.S. Cities."

== Awards ==
- Cochon 555 National Champion (2012)
- Food & Wine "Best New Chef" (2013)
- Michelin Guide's "Bib Gourmand" Award
- Thrillist Chef of the Year (2016)

== Family life ==
Vincent lives in Logan Square, Chicago with his wife and two daughters.
