= Kap klaem =

Thai term for food consumed with alcohol

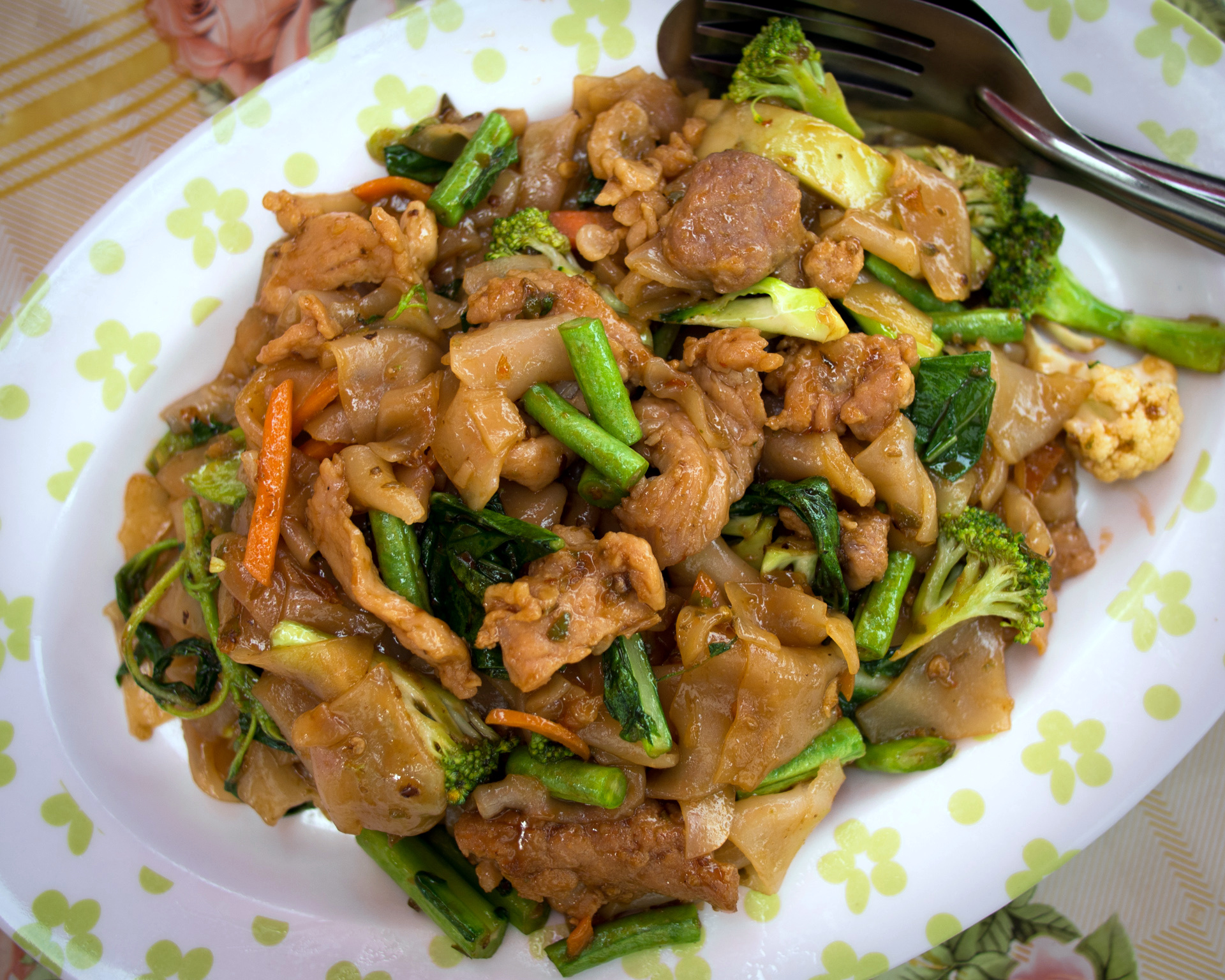
- Drunken noodles, a dish commonly eaten with alcoholic beverages
- Alternative names: Ahan kap klaem, ahan klaem lao
- Course: Snack
- Place of origin: Thailand
- Associated cuisine: Thai

Kap klaem (Thai: กับแกล้ม, pronounced [kàp klɛ̂ːm]), also known as ahan kap klaem (Thai: อาหารกับแกล้ม, [ʔāː.hǎːn kàp klɛ̂ːm]) or ahan klaem lao (Thai: อาหารแกล้มเหล้า, [ʔāː.hǎːn klɛ̂ːm lâw]), is the Thai term for "drinking food": foods commonly eaten while drinking. The term kap klaem can also refer to Thai drinking culture.

== Thai drinking culture ==
In Thailand, drinks are almost always accompanied by food, no matter how simple the food. According to Haaretz, the term kap klaem is also used to refer to the Thai drinking culture in general.

Kap klaem is served in homes, on the street, and in specialty restaurants that open in the late afternoon and are open until very early morning. According to Haaretz, a typical kap klaem eating and drinking session can last three hours.

== Foods ==
Many foods commonly eaten while drinking are also served as snacks or parts of a meal, but some are seldom eaten outside the context of drinking, and these are usually salty, chewy, crunchy, sour, and/or spicy, but generally not heavy or rich. Strong flavors and heavy spicing are typical.

There are few foods specifically defined as drinking foods, and many dishes can be turned into drinking foods by adjusting seasonings and portion sizes. Drinking foods are seldom served with the rice that typically accompanies actual meals in Thailand.

Kap klaem is common throughout Thailand, but the foods typically eaten while drinking vary regionally. According to chef Kris Yenbamroong, the foods typically are “something a group of people can share, which is an important aspect of it". Vogue described the foods as "irresistible food that's somewhere in between a snack and a meal."

Common aahaan kap klaem include lap mu thot, phat khimao (which translates to "drunkard's stir-fry"), thua thot samunphrai, and nam phrik.

== Drinks ==
Lagers such as Singha are popular in Thailand. Beer is typically poured over ice.

Rice whiskeys such as lao khao and ya dong are common distilled liquors. A common cocktail is Whiskey Soda, which is a generic term for any brown liquor mixed with soda water.

According to Andy Ricker, many bars in Thailand are BYOB; customers pay for their mixers and food.

== See also ==
- Anju (food) – Korean term for food eaten with alcohol
- Hors d'oeuvre – Small dish served before main meal
- Meze – Small dish in Middle Eastern and Balkan cuisines
- Pusas – Traditional appetiser or snack eaten with alcohol in Sabah, Malaysia
- Sakana – Japanese snacks, eaten with alcohol
- Tapas – Appetiser or snack in Spanish and international cuisine
