= Scott Bryan =

American chef

- Born: Brookline, Massachusetts
- Occupation: chef
- Known for: 1996 America's Best New Chef from Food & Wine

Scott Bryan is an American chef. He has served as the executive chef of Veritas and Apiary in New York City. Veritas received three stars from The New York Times when Bryan was a chef there. In his 2000 memoir Kitchen Confidential, Anthony Bourdain referred to Bryan as "a cult figure among cooks".

== Early life ==
Bryan was born in Brookline, Massachusetts. He attended Brookline High School. After graduation, he enrolled in Johnson & Wales University's College of Culinary Arts. He dropped out of school to work for Robert Kinkead at Harvest in Cambridge, Massachusetts. After moving to France, he returned to the US and worked at 21 Federal in Nantucket, Massachusetts for a time. He then worked as sous chef under Éric Ripert at Le Bernardin. His first position as executive chef was at Luma in 1994, then a vegetarian restaurant. Bryan reworked the menu to include meat and turned the struggling restaurant around. He then moved to Indigo which he started with business partner Gino Diaferia. After serving as executive chef at Indigo for four years, he and Diaferia opened Veritas in 1999. While at Veritas, Bryan received a three star rating from The New York Times. He finally left Veritas in 2007 to work at 10 Downing Street, but due to delays left the project and became executive chef at Apiary instead. He left Apiary in 2014 and served as executive chef at The Milling Room until January 2018.

== Awards and honors ==
- 1996 America's Best New Chef from Food & Wine
