= Super Chef =

- Directed by: Tropical
- Country of origin: Mauritius
- Original language: French
- No. of seasons: 3

Production
- Running time: 45 minutes
- Production company: Tropical

Original release
- Network: MBC 1
- Release: April 2011

Super Chef is a cookery competition by Tropical in Mauritius broadcast in French. It was created for Mauritians amateurs to encourage emerging talents. It offers creativity within a tried and trusted formula. It first aired on MBC 1 in 2011. Season 3 debuted on 3 October 2014.
