= Takashi Yagihashi =

Japanese chef

Takashi Yagihashi is a Japanese chef, residing in the United States. He specializes in a fusion of French and Asian cuisine.

== Career ==
In 1996, Takashi opened his first restaurant Tribute. The Detroit Free Press gave the restaurant four stars; The New York Times called it "maybe the best restaurant between New York and Chicago and certainly the finest in Detroit." In 2003, he was named the 13th Annual James Beard Foundation Award for Best Chef: Midwest. In 2005, he opened Okada for Steve Wynn in the Wynn Las Vegas, where he created a contemporary Japanese menu influenced by his French training. He has since become a member of the Macy's culinary council and he opened Noodles by Takashi Yagihashi at Macy's in Chicago before opening his namesake restaurant in December 2007. Takashi also owns and operates another Chicago based restaurant, a Japanese-style ramen house called Slurping Turtle which opened in November 2011. In April 2014, he opened another location of Slurping Turtle in Ann Arbor, Michigan. He was featured on an episode of Iron Chef America in the 2012 season, where it was mentioned that he started cooking because he needed money for milk, which he credits that as the start of his cooking career.

Yagahashi appeared on Top Chef Masters (season 4) in 2012, participating in seven rounds, and was featured on the cooking show Great Chefs.

In 2009, he published the book Takashi's Noodles together with Harris Salat.

His namesake restaurant in Chicago closed at the end of the year in 2014. The Chicago restaurant of Slurping Turtle recently closed on May 30, 2019; the Ann Arbor, Michigan restaurant remains opened with a second location open in Columbus, Ohio Yagahashi is no longer affiliated with Slurping Turtle (as of 2018). His newest culinary venture is Pernoi, in Birmingham, Mich., which he opened with Chef Luciano DelSignore in Sep 2019.
