= Todd English =

American celebrity chef

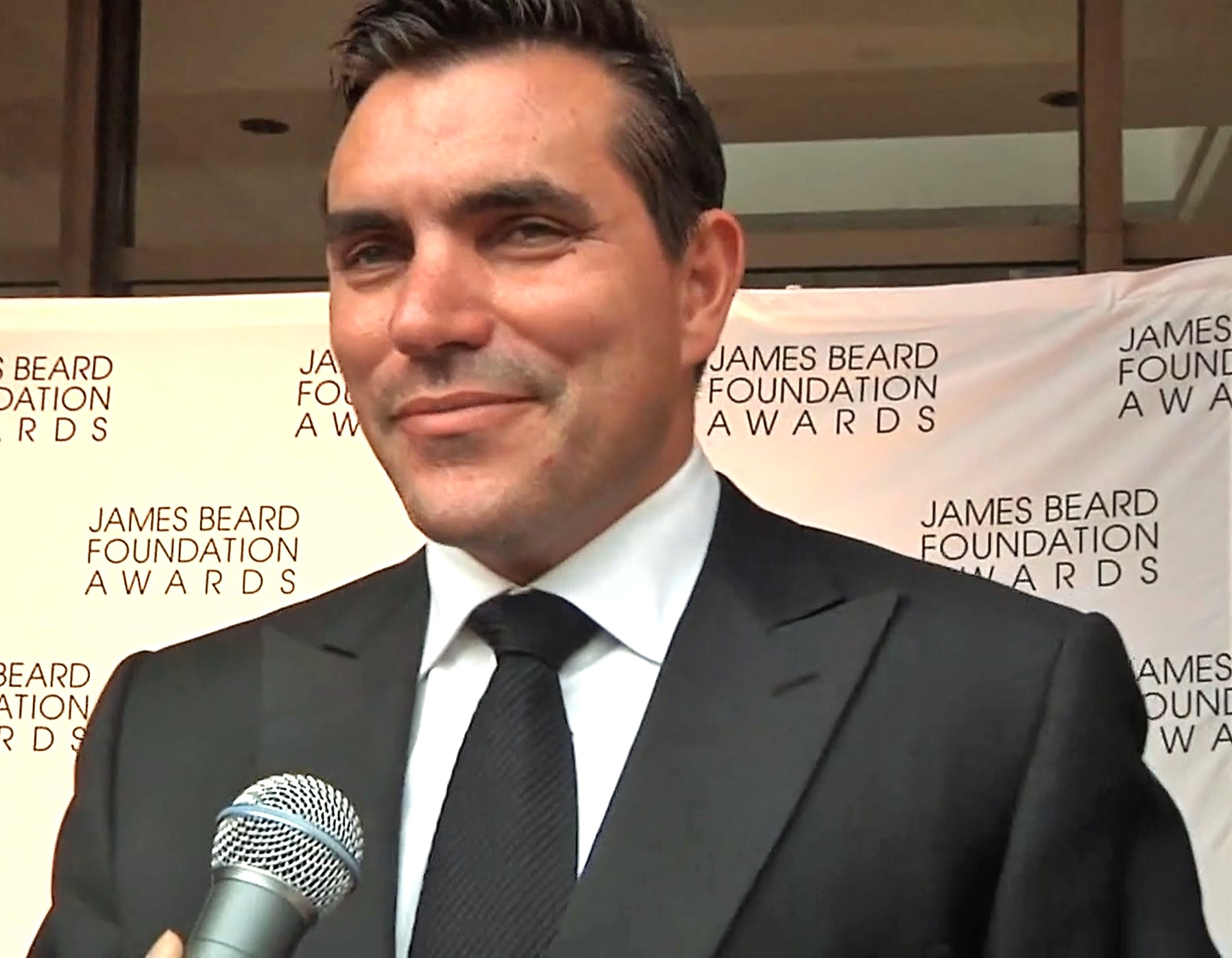
- English interviewed at the James Beard Foundation Awards 2010
- Born: William Todd English; August 29, 1960 (age 66); Amarillo, Texas
- Education: Culinary Institute of America
- Occupations: Restaurateur, celebrity chef, writer
- Spouse: Olivia Disch English (divorced)
- Children: 3

William Todd English (born August 29, 1960) is an American celebrity chef, restaurateur, author, and television personality, based in Boston, Massachusetts. He hosted the TV cooking show, Food Trip with Todd English, on PBS. In 2005 he was a judge on the PBS show Cooking Under Fire.

His life and career received a chapter in Super Chef by Juliette Rossant, who had written previously about English for the Forbes Celebrity 100 list. Todd English also works as lead chef for Delta Air Lines (US).

== Early life and career ==
English was born in Amarillo, Texas, grew up in Sandy Springs, Georgia, and later Branford, Connecticut. He matriculated at Guilford College in North Carolina on a baseball scholarship but quit and entered the Culinary Institute of America in 1978 and graduated in 1982.

He worked under Jean-Jacques Rachou at New York's La Cote Basque, and then moved to Italy to work at several restaurants there. He returned to the United States at age 25 and served as the executive chef of the Italian restaurant Michela's in Cambridge, Massachusetts, for three years, before opening the original Olives restaurant in 1989.

== Personal life ==
English was married to Olivia Disch English, his classmate at the Culinary Institute of America. The couple has since divorced; they have three children. He was engaged to Erica Wang in 2009; however, their wedding was called off.

== Restaurants ==
=== Olives ===
English's first restaurant, Olives, opened in the Charlestown neighborhood of Boston in April 1989. One of his employees, future restaurateur Barbara Lynch, has stated that English physically abused her during her time there. The restaurant's name is a tribute to his then-wife, Olivia. The food is "rustic Mediterranean," with a strong influence from Italian cuisine. The restaurant was named Best New Restaurant by Boston magazine and has been honored as Best Food and Top Table by Gourmet magazine. Olives is known for two signature desserts – a molten chocolate cake and a vanilla bean soufflé – which must be ordered with the main meal. The Health Department has cited Olives for sanitation discrepancies and animal waste hazards.

In October 1998, Olives opened in the Bellagio hotel in Las Vegas; it closed in 2019.

In May 2010, Olives was closed due to damage done by a grease fire. This was the third time the Charlestown eatery was closed due to fire damage since 2001.

In May 2012, the Charlestown Olives reopened.

In June 2013, the Charlestown Olives closed for good.

A second Olives was opened in 2001 at W New York - Union Square in Union Square, New York City, but was closed in 2015.

In February 2013, Olives opened in Mexico City. The remaining Olives are the Atlantis Resort on Paradise Island in Nassau, Bahamas, and the Ritz-Carlton Canal (hotel and resort) in Abu Dhabi.

In 2021, Olives opened in Virgin Hotels Las Vegas.

=== Figs ===
Figs is the name of two pizzerias in the Boston area, one in the Beacon Hill neighborhood and another in Charlestown (now closed). Figs offers authentic Neapolitan-style pizzas with very thin crusts, served on inverted sheet pans, as well as salads and pastas. Figs won the "Hot Concept" award from Nation's Restaurant News magazine.

=== Other restaurants ===
English's other restaurants include:

- The Beast by Todd English, at Area15 in Las Vegas, Nevada
- Bonfire, a steakhouse in Boston and New York
- Todd English, an alternative restaurant aboard the luxury RMS Queen Mary 2, and MS Queen Victoria
- BlueZoo, a restaurant at the Walt Disney World Dolphin Hotel in Orlando, Florida
- Da Campo Osteria, in the Il Lugano Hotel in Fort Lauderdale, Florida, featuring views of the intracoastal waterway
- Todd English, P.U.B in the Aria Casino in Las Vegas, Nevada
- Todd English, P.U.B. in the Uptown Entertainment District in Birmingham, Alabama
- Fig's at The Macys at the Gardens Mall, Palm Beach Gardens, Florida
- Plaza Food Hall at the Plaza Hotel in New York City
- Figs at 29 Fair in Nantucket, Massachusetts
- Tuscany at Mohegan Sun Casino in Uncasville, Connecticut
- Ember Room in New York City
- Taylor Sine's Pool Noodle House
- The Stinger at the Intercontinental Hotel in Times Square, New York
- MXDC, a Mexican restaurant in downtown Washington, D.C.
- The Food Hall, formerly Todd English Food Hall Manila or Food Hall by Todd English, in SM Aura, Taguig City, Manila, Philippines
  - Flatterie
  - The Grill
  - Hook
  - Pound
- The Pepper Club in the downtown Las Vegas Arts District

== Books ==
English has authored or co-authored four cookbooks: The Olives Table, The Figs Table, The Olives Dessert Table, with Sally Sampson, and Cooking in Everyday English, published by Simon & Schuster and Time Home Entertainment Inc.

== Net worth ==
As of 2020, English's net worth was $18.5 million. He was the ninth-highest-earning chef in the world.
