= MasterChef USA =

American competitive cooking show

- Logo
- Presented by: Gary Rhodes
- Country of origin: United States
- Original language: English
- No. of seasons: 2
- No. of episodes: 26

Production
- Executive producer: Elizabeth Brock
- Running time: 30-60 minutes per episode

Original release
- Network: PBS
- Release: April 1, 2000 – June 30, 2001

Related
- MasterChef (American TV series)

MasterChef USA is an American competitive cooking show that aired on PBS from 2000 to 2001. The series was hosted by Gary Rhodes. The series format was based directly on BBC's MasterChef, which used Rhodes as host during 2001. The show had two seasons.

The first season premiered on April 1, 2000 with a total of 13 half-hour-long episodes and 1 hour-long special. 27 contestants arose from the auditions held in each region, in which office manager Nancy Vaziri of Homewood, Illinois won the title of MasterChef 2000.

The second season started on April 7, 2001 with a total of 13 half-hour episodes and 1 hour-long special. Similarly, 27 contestants advanced; wherein business owner Geoffrey Hill of Evanston, Illinois was proclaimed as MasterChef 2001.

== Production ==
Due to the success of the British Broadcasting Corporation cooking show MasterChef, PBS acquired rights to screen and West 175 make an American version of MasterChef.

When it came to finding a chef to present the show, executive producer Elizabeth Brock initially wanted British cook Gary Rhodes for the job. "He is so alive on camera," points out Brock. "And he also has the unique ability to combine true expertise on cooking with his gift of communicating in an entertaining style."

== Summary ==
During the first 9 weeks, twenty-seven cooks from different regions faced-off in a challenge involving their best original two-course menu which must cost less than $60.00 and cook them in only two and a half hours. Nine contestants will be picked to move on to the next round where they will battle against another set of cooks from another region. From there, three will be picked to compete in the finale, where one of them will grab the coveted title for the next MasterChef.

=== Season 1 ===
The first season saw 27 cooks battling for a spot in the semi-final round. A set of three cooks competed in the Southwestern, Southeastern, and Northwestern regions while six cooks competed in a two-part challenge in the Midwestern, Western, and Northeastern divisions. On May 27, 2000, the complete setlist of 27 cooks were revealed. In the end, medical practice office manager Nancy Vaziri of Homewood, Illinois was proclaimed MasterChef 2000, winning herself a trip to CuisinArt Resort and Spa, a $1000 Williams Sonoma gift certificate, a subscription to the International Association of Culinary Professionals and a short-term editorial for Bon Appétit.

Contestant	State	Region	Occupation	Status
Nancy Vaziri	IL	Midwestern	Medical Practice Office Manager	Winner 24 June
Lynne Champion	CA	Western	Bed and Breakfast Owner	Runner-up 24 June
Stephen Both	DE	Northeastern	Painting Contractor	Third 24 June
Gary Wall	TX	Southwestern	Television director	Eliminated 17 June
Jennifer Spencer	GA	Southeastern	Insurance Underwriter	Eliminated 17 June
Bob Hafey	IL	Midwestern	Manufacturing Manager	Eliminated 10 June
Lani Meltzer	CA	Western	Surgical Assistant	Eliminated 10 June
Dana Maxey	NY	Northeastern	Investment Banker	Eliminated 3 June
Scott Stevenson	OR	Northwestern	Realtor	Eliminated 3 June
Lew Sherwood	NY	Northeastern	Advertising Executive	Eliminated 27 May
Pietro Fragale	NY	Northeastern	Hospital Administrator	Eliminated 27 May
Erminia Mack	IL	Midwestern	Homemaker	Eliminated 20 May
Dhont Martial	IL	Midwestern	Surgeon	Eliminated 20 May
James Morgan	AZ	Western	Information Designer	Eliminated 13 May
Michelle Fish	AZ	Western	Scuba Diver	Eliminated 13 May
Kirk Cochran	GA	Southeastern	Firefighter	Eliminated 6 May
Nikki Norman	FL	Southeastern	Community and civic volunteer	Eliminated 6 May
Frances Maxwell	WA	Northwestern	Student	Eliminated 29 April
Melanie Hartley	WA	Northwestern	Nurse	Eliminated 29 April
Richard Russell	VA	Northeastern	U.S. House of Representative Deputy Chief of Staff in Science	Eliminated 22 April
Shanti Jain	NJ	Northeastern	Homemaker	Eliminated 22 April
Renee Evers	NV	Western	Musician	Eliminated 15 April
Richard Kronick	AZ	Western	Graphic designer	Eliminated 15 April
Peter Flores	IL	Midwestern	Paralegal	Eliminated 8 April
Susan Achinapura	IL	Midwestern	Homemaker	Eliminated 8 April
Kay Dalton	TX	Southwestern	Mom	Eliminated 1 April
Richard Winters	TX	Southwestern	Rancher	Eliminated 1 April

Ep# / Show-Ep#	Original Airdate	Episode Title / Event	Ref.
Regional Cook-offs
1/1.1	1 April 2000	Series Premiere: Regional Cook-off 1.1 - 27 amateur chefs from different parts of the country competed in 9 first-round challenges which will minimize the field to 9. In the first cook-off, Skitch Henderson and David Rosengarten judged the cooking of Southwestern cooks Gary, Kay, and Richard W. in a two-course menu challenge. Gary was announced through to the semi-finals, while Kay and Rick are eliminated.	
2/1.2	8 April 2000	Regional Cook-off 1.2 - Midwestern chefs Nancy, Peter, and Susan are judged by George Wallace and Michel Nischan. Nancy was proclaimed the winner, sending Peter and Susan packing.	
3/1.3	15 April 2000	Regional Cook-off 1.3 - Guest judges Robin Leach and Lidia Bastianich criticized Western cooks Lynne, Renee, and Richard K. Lynne won by a clean slate, defeating Renee and Richie.	
4/1.4	22 April 2000	Regional Cook-off 1.4 - Northeast chefs Richard R., Shanti, and Stephen vied in a cookoff watched by Madhur Jaffrey and Carolyn O'Neil. Stephen triumphed, sending Richard and Shanti home.	
5/1.5	29 April 2000	Regional Cook-off 1.5 - Northwestern amateurs Frances, Melanie, and Scott competed in a cookoff for Thierry Rautureau and Claudia Cohen. In the end, Scott went forward while Frances and Melanie walked.	
6/1.6	6 May 2000	Regional Cook-off 1.6 - Southeastern contestants Jennifer, Kirk, and Nikki battled in a challenge judged by Nathalie Dupree and Colman Andrews. Jennifer advanced whereas Kirk and Nikki stayed.	
7/1.7	13 May 2000	Regional Cook-off 1.7 - The second set of Western amateurs (Lani, Michelle, and Morgan) competed to satisfy judges Molly O'Neill and Vincent Schiavelli. Ultimately, Lani saved herself from elimination with Michelle and Morgan.	
8/1.8	20 May 2000	Regional Cook-off 1.8 - Midwestern chefs Bob, Erminia, and Jack fought against each other to win judges George Wallace and Stephan Pyles. The challenge witnessed Erminia and Jack lacking skills compared to Bob, eliminating them.	
9/1.9	27 May 2000	Regional Cook-off 1.9 - The last group of cooks from the Northeast (Dana, Lew, and Pietro) were judged by Jacques Torres and Jock Soto. Dana gained the last spot in the semi-finals while Lew and Pietro departed the competition.	
Semi-Finals
10/1.10	3 June 2000	Semi-Finals 1.1 - Dana, Lynne, and Scott met in a semi-final round with judges Sissy Biggers and Kit Skarstrom. Lynne was the obvious winner, while Dana and Scott lost.	
11/1.11	10 June 2000	Semi-Finals 1.2 - A semi-final round cookoff features Bob, Lani, and Nancy cooking for Sheila Lukins and Claudia Cohen. After a long decision, Nancy was deemed safe. On the other hand, Bob and Lani left the competition.	
12/1.12	17 June 2000	Semi-Finals 1.3 - The last semi-final round saw Gary, Jennifer, and Stephen battling for Joan Nathan and Tanya Wenman Steel. Stephen proved stronger, eliminating Gary and Jennifer.	
Finale
Special 1	22 June 2000	MasterChef USA Special 1 - The special featured a preview of the final-round cook-off. The episode also included interviews with the contestants and season highlights.	
Finale 1	24 June 2000	Grand Finale 1 - The finale saw Lynne, Nancy, and Stephen cooking for Jacques Pepin and Robin Mattson in a three-course meal challenge. Nancy's menu which consisted of Mushroom Pâté in Filo Pastry Baskets atop Field of Greens, Morgh Pollo (Seasoned Pilaf of Roasted Chicken), and Fruit Tart Cheesecake was deemed more impressive, defeating Lynne and Stephen for the title of MasterChef 2000.	

=== Season 2 ===
The second season, like its predecessor, witnessed 27 cooks battling for a spot in the semi-final round. A set of three cooks competed in the Southwestern, Southeastern, and Northwestern regions while six cooks competed in a two-part challenge in the Midwestern, Western, and Northeastern divisions. On June 2, 2001, the complete setlist of 27 cooks were revealed. In the end, small business owner Geoffrey Hill of Evanston, Illinois was announced MasterChef 2001, claiming prizes that included an all-expense-paid two-week stay at Cuisinarts Caribbean resort, Le Creuset cookware, $1000 Williams-Sonoma gift certificate and other cuisine-related prizes.

Contestant	State	Region	Occupation	Status
Geoffrey Hill	IL	Midwestern	Business Owner	Winner 30 June
David Ross	WA	Northwestern	Airline Supervisor	Runner-up 30 June
Lala Cheema	FL	Southeastern	Biology Teacher	Third 30 June
Josie Aaronson-Gelb	CA	Western	Public Relations Officer	Eliminated 23 June
Marion Stevens	CA	Western	Retired	Eliminated 23 June
Cindy Blakeslee	VT	Northeastern	Non-profit Organization Director	Eliminated 16 June
Kyung Chang	NY	Northeastern	Set Designer	Eliminated 16 June
Janet Moore	MI	Midwestern	Retired	Eliminated 9 June
Mary Boyd	TX	Southwestern	Realtor	Eliminated 9 June
Herman Liu	NM	Southwestern	Management Consultant	Eliminated 2 June
Kristen Ritchie	OK	Southwestern	Company Vice President	Eliminated 2 June
Baron Long	CA	Western	Professional Sales Agent	Eliminated 26 May
Martina Thurlow	CA	Western	Attorney	Eliminated 26 May
Charles Sweeney	DC	Northeastern	Corporate Communications Manager	Eliminated 19 May
Joan Churchill	NH	Northeastern	Theatrical Designer	Eliminated 19 May
Camilla Saulsbury	IN	Midwestern	Student	Eliminated 12 May
Robert Whitt	IN	Midwestern	Real Estate Firm President	Eliminated 12 May
Kimberly Davis	FL	Southeastern	Self-employed	Eliminated 5 May
Peter Hyzak	FL	Southeastern	Sales Manager	Eliminated 5 May
Gail Singer	CA	Western	Real Estate Agent	Eliminated 28 April
Heather Rizzoli	CA	Western	Self-employed	Eliminated 28 April
Laura Chavoen	NY	Northeastern	Business Strategist	Eliminated 21 April
Tirso Perez	NY	Northeastern	Restaurateur	Eliminated 21 April
Joseph King	WA	Northwestern	Software Developer	Eliminated 14 April
Kathy Urbano	ID	Northwestern	Counselor	Eliminated 14 April
Kaylan Dutta	MI	Midwestern	Engineer	Eliminated 7 April
Norita Solt	IA	Midwestern	Retired	Eliminated 7 April

Ep# / Show-Ep#	Original Airdate	Episode Title / Event	Ref.
Regional Cook-offs
1/2.1	7 April 2001	Series Premiere: Regional Cook-off 2.1 - Midwestern cooks Geoffrey, Kaylan, and Norita prepared their best gourmet recipes against the clock to try and capture the regional title. With judges Bobby Collins and Susan Feniger on the tasting table, Geoffrey won the first round while Kaylan and Norita were eliminated.	
2/2.2	14 April 2001	Regional Cook-off 2.2 - Northwestern contestants David, Joseph, and Kathy cooked for judges Jerry di Vecchio and Tom Douglas. David was deemed safe and through, sending Joseph and Kathy home.	
3/2.3	21 April 2001	Regional Cook-off 2.3 - Northeastern contestants Cindy, Laura, and Tirso prepared their best dishes to Laurin Sydney and Benjamin Ford. Cindy triumphed, leading to Laura and Tirso's departure.	
4/2.4	28 April 2001	Regional Cook-off 2.4 - Western chefs Gail, Heather, and Marion battled for a spot in the semi-finals. In the end, judges Jacklyn Zeman and Mark Peel announced Marion as the winner, kicking Gail and Heather out of the competition.	
5/2.5	5 May 2001	Regional Cook-off 2.5 - Southeastern cooks Lala, Kimberly, and Peter created their best recipes under the guidance of David Brenner and Mary Sue Milliken. Lala advanced while Kimberly and Peter walked.	
6/2.6	12 May 2001	Regional Cook-off 2.6 - The second set of Midwestern chefs (Camilla, Janet, and Robert) cooked under pressure. Judges Suzanne Rogers and Damian Mandola unanimously picked Janet, removing Camilla and Robert from the contest.	
7/2.7	19 May 2001	Regional Cook-off 2.7 - Northeastern contestants Charles, Joan, and Kyung served up their signature dishes to Tom Bergeron and Richard Kaupp. Kyung successfully granted herself a place in the next round, saying goodbye to Charles and Joan.	
8/2.8	26 May 2001	Regional Cook-off 2.8 - Western chefs Baron, Josie, and Martina presented their culinary skills and knowledge to Bill Nye the Science Guy and Michael Chiarello. Josie went through, whereas Baron and Martina didn't.	
9/2.9	2 June 2001	Regional Cook-off 2.9 - The last group of cooks from the Southwest (Herman, Kristen, and Mary) displayed their abilities to judges Suzanne Sena and Mark Miller. Mary grasps the last spot in the semi-finals, eliminating Herman and Kristen.	
Semi-Finals
10/2.10	9 June 2001	Semi-Finals 2.1 - Geoffrey, Janet, and Mary competed for first place in the finale. Judges Barbara Fairchild and Piero Selvaggio were impressed by Geoffrey, sending Janet and Mary packing.	
11/2.11	16 June 2001	Semi-Finals 2.2 - Cindy, Kyung, and Lala were judged by A. J. Benza and Rick Bayless. Lala prevails, defeating Cindy and Kyung.	
12/2.12	23 June 2001	Semi-Finals 2.3 - The last semi-final round saw David, Josie, and Marion battling for judges Donna Mills and Allyson Thurber. David became the clear winner, while Josie and Marion went home.	
Finale
Special 2	28 June 2001	MasterChef USA Special 2 - The special featured a preview of the final-round cook-off. The episode also included interviews with the contestants and season highlights.	
Finale 1	30 June 2001	Grand Finale 2 - The finale saw David, Geoffrey, and Nancy cooking for B. Smith and MasterChef 2000 Nancy Vaziri in a three-course meal challenge. Lala's menu which consisted of Shami Kabobs with Mango Chutney, Shrimp Curry with Browned Rice and Red Bell Pepper, and Sautéed Squash with Ginger Slices, and Jalabees proved better than David's Dungeness Crab Mosaic with Marjoram Mayonnaise and Pear Chips, Cedar-Planked Halibut with Mashed Potatoes, Garlic Broth and Frizzled Onions, and Toasted Hazelnut Ice Cream with Huckleberry Compote and Geoffrey's Creamy Yellow Pepper Soup Cibreo, Roast King Salmon with Pesto Glaze and Nutty Bundled Green Beans, and Caramelized Pineapple and Coconut Tart, winning him the title of MasterChef 2001.	

== Celebrity judges ==
Every challenge featured a panel of two celebrity judges. Personalities are listed alphabetically:

- Colman Andrews - Regional Cook-off 1.6
- Lidia Bastianich - Regional Cook-off 1.3
- Rick Bayless - Semi-Finals 2.2
- A. J. Benza - Semi-Finals 2.2
- Tom Bergeron - Regional Cook-off 2.7
- Sissy Biggers - Semi-Finals 1.1
- David Brenner - Regional Cook-off 2.5
- Michael Chiarello - Regional Cook-off 2.8
- Claudia Cohen - Regional Cook-off 1.5 and Semi-Finals 1.2
- Bobby Collins - Regional Cook-off 2.1
- Jerry di Vecchio - Regional Cook-off 2.2
- Tom Douglas - Regional Cook-off 2.2
- Nathalie Dupree - Regional Cook-off 1.6
- Barbara Fairchild - Semi-Finals 2.1
- Susan Feniger - Regional Cook-off 2.1
- Benjamin Ford - Regional Cook-off 2.3
- Skitch Henderson - Regional Cook-off 1.1
- Madhur Jaffrey - Regional Cook-off 1.4
- Richard Kaupp - Regional Cook-off 2.7
- Robin Leach - Regional Cook-off 1.3
- Sheila Lukins - Semi-Finals 1.2
- Damian Mandola - Regional Cook-off 2.6
- Robin Mattson - MasterChef USA 1 and Grand Finale 1
- Mark Miller - Regional Cook-off 2.9
- Mary Sue Milliken - Regional Cook-off 2.5
- Donna Mills - Semi-Finals 2.3
- Joan Nathan - Semi-Finals 1.3
- Michel Nischan - Regional Cook-off 1.2
- Bill Nye the Science Guy - Regional Cook-off 2.8
- Carolyn O'Neil - Regional Cook-off 1.4
- Molly O'Neill - Regional Cook-off 1.7
- Mark Peel - Regional Cook-off 2.4
- Jacques Pépin - MasterChef USA Special 1 and Grand Finale 1
- Stephan Pyles - Regional Cook-off 1.8
- Thierry Rautureau - Regional Cook-off 1.5
- Suzanne Rogers - Regional Cook-off 2.6
- David Rosengarten - Regional Cook-off 1.1
- Vincent Schiavelli - Regional Cook-off 1.7
- Piero Selvaggio - Semi-Finals 2.1
- Suzanne Sena - Regional Cook-off 2.9
- B. Smith - Grand Finale 2
- Kit Skarstrom - Semi-Finals 1.1
- Jock Soto - Regional Cook-off 1.9
- Tanya Wenman Steel - Semi-Finals 1.3
- Laurin Sydney - Regional Cook-off 2.3
- Allyson Thurber - Semi-Finals 2.3
- Jacques Torres - Regional Cook-off 1.9
- Nancy Vaziri - Grand Finale 2
- George Wallace - Regional Cook-off 1.2 and Regional Cook-off 1.8
- Jacklyn Zeman - Regional Cook-off 2.4

== Revival ==
On July 27, 2010, Fox premiered the similarly titled cooking show MasterChef among its primetime programs. The show, hosted and judged by British chef Gordon Ramsay and American restaurateurs Joe Bastianich and Graham Elliot, followed the new format of the BBC version.
