= Cumberland Hotel =

Hotel in Westminster, London

Coordinates: 51.51365°N 0.1584°W

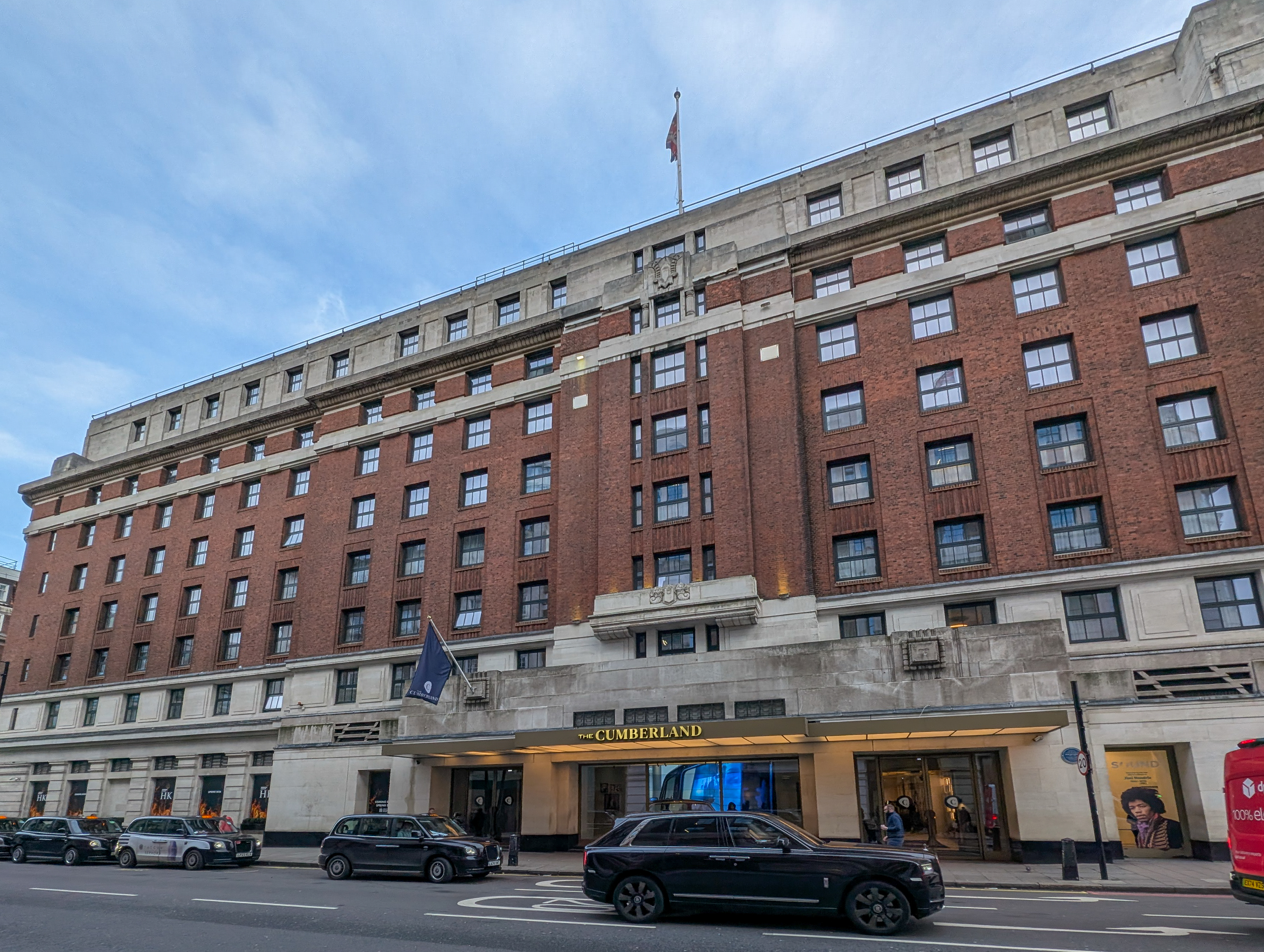
Entrance to the hotel on Great Cumberland Place

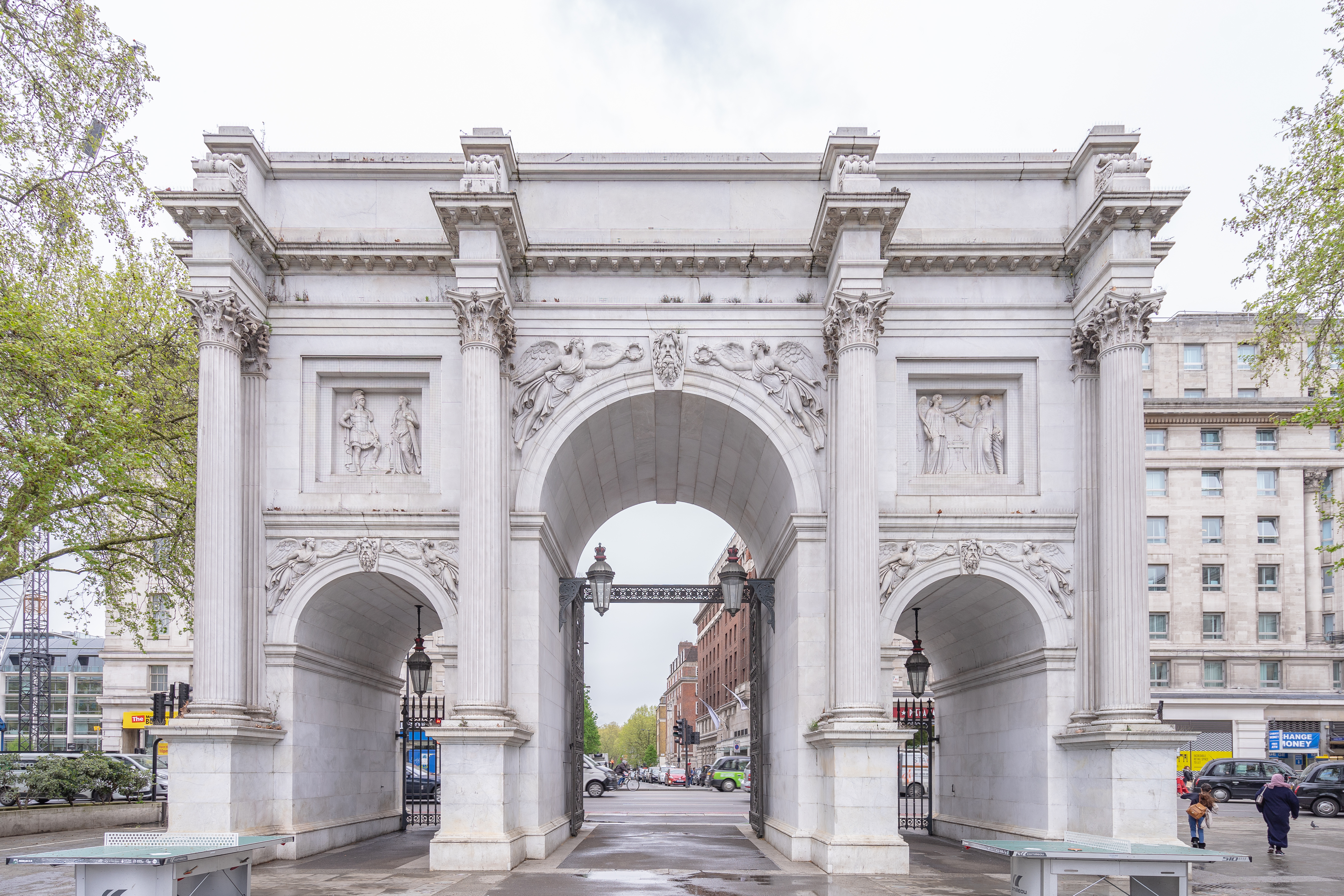
Marble Arch, with parts of the Cumberland Hotel visible through it and behind to the right

The Cumberland Hotel, Marble Arch, also known as the Cumberland, is a historic four-star hotel on Great Cumberland Place and Oxford Street in Westminster, Central London.

When opened in December 1933, with its 1,000 rooms the hotel claimed to be the largest in Europe, and also "the most modern and elaborate in the world".

Taking up a whole block, but with some shops at ground level, the hotel is named for Great Cumberland Place, one of the four streets it lies between, and has its main entrance there.

The way in to Marble Arch tube station is in the middle of the side of the hotel along Oxford Street. Just beyond Marble Arch (pictured) is Speakers' Corner.

In 2024, the Cumberland was given a face-lift and was described as "awash in bright lights and gold fixtures, brash and blingy, but nevertheless spectacular".

== Site ==
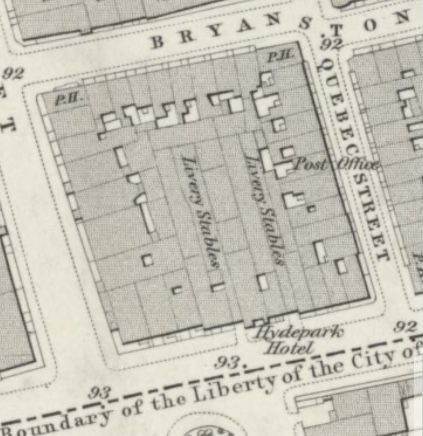
The future site of the hotel as surveyed in 1870

From at least the late 18th century, in the middle of the Oxford Street front of the future hotel site there was an inn or coffee house called the General Wolfe, with livery stables in the yard behind it. By 1818, this had become the Hyde Park Hotel, and the street in front of it was called Hyde Park Place. In 1889, the street was renamed as Marble Arch, and the hotel also took the name.

Before the redevelopment of the 1930s, the site contained about thirty houses, fronting onto four streets, a public house, and the office of the Marble Arch Electric Railway Station. Lying to the north of Oxford Street, it was just within the Borough of St Marylebone, and not that of Westminster.

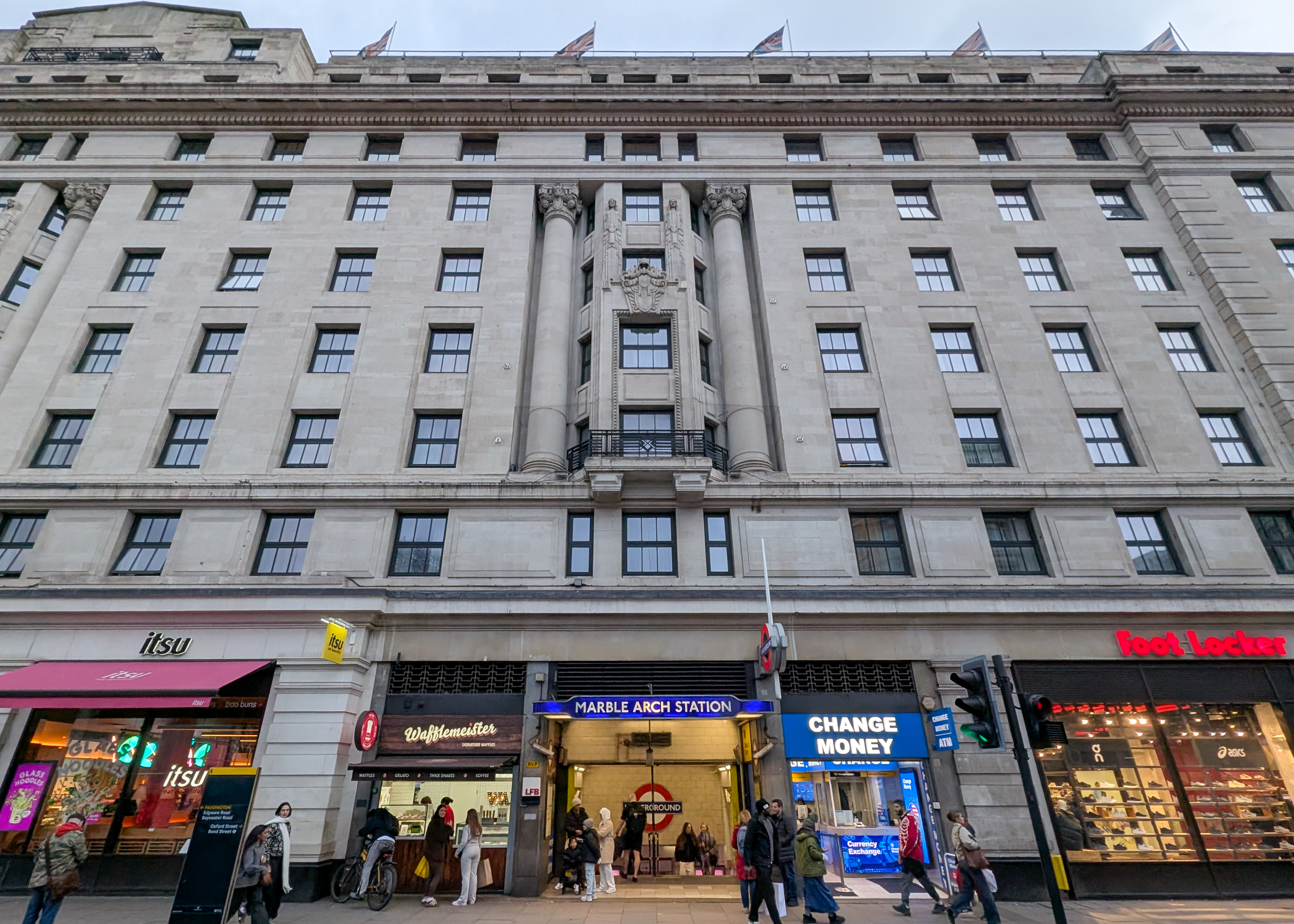
The way into the Marble Arch tube station is in the hotel's Oxford Street frontage, as the station was there first. This is also where the Marble Arch Hotel stood.

In February 1930, a provisional license was granted for the Cumberland Hotel, to be built on the site of the Marble Arch Hotel, Oxford Street, and the Coachmakers Arms, Bryanston Street. The licence of the Marble Arch Hotel was also renewed.

== Construction ==
Site preparation works on land at the western end of Oxford Street, facing Marble Arch and Hyde Park, were already under way in 1928. The digging of a great hole in the ground was begun, and Canadian timber, in lengths of 30 and 35 feet, ten or twelve inches square in thickness, was used for temporary shoring. The intended name of Cumberland Hotel had already been announced.

The building of the hotel began in 1930, and the builders were Holloway Brothers of London. The architect was F. J. Wills FRIBA, who had also designed the Strand Palace Hotel and the Regent Palace Hotel.

The Cumberland Hotel was built on a steel frame and took more than three years to build. The main elevations are in Portland stone on Oxford Street, in brick and Portland stone elsewhere. As built, the hotel has eight storeys above ground level and another seven below it.

In May 1931, a workman died after falling from a gantry, and another man died in August of that year.

The Western Mail noted on completion that "The night scene at the Marble Arch, London, has been considerably changed by the addition of the Cumberland Hotel with its floodlights."

== Fitting out ==
Oliver Percy Bernard designed many of the interiors. There were a thousand bathrooms, all lined with tiles from Jackfield. The hotel boasted a lift which was "the first of a kind which travels at a rate of 500 feet a minute"

It was reported on 4 December 1933 that new carpets from Yorkshire had been bought at a cost of £40,000 (equivalent to £3,586,932 in 2023), and that Wm. Rhodes. Ltd was supplying pillows for the one thousand bedrooms. On 7 December came reports that forty-five tons of Sheffield cutlery had arrived in London for the hotel, and it had received more than 900 "super box spring mattresses" and three thousand down pillows. With the nation still suffering from the Great Depression, the press also noted that there had been "a rush for jobs" at the hotel.

== Opening ==
It was announced on 7 December 1933 that the opening of the new hotel was imminent, and that this would be marked on 11 December by Sir Isidore Salmon, chairman of J. Lyons and Co., the company behind the hotel, who would preside at a luncheon for a large number of invited guests.

On the morning of 11 December, Salmon gave King George V and his wife Queen Mary a private tour of the hotel, lasting an hour. A history of the hotel's site and its development was published, by William Walcot, with a foreword by John Drinkwater. This noted that "the hotel windows would have commanded an excellent view of the executions of Perkin Warbeck, Jack Sheppard, and others on Tyburn gallows.

At the luncheon, a number of toasts were proposed. In one to "the Press", Salmon said that no one understood better than Lyons the value of press advertising; Lord Camrose, owner of many newspapers, replied and called for a review of the licensing laws, noting that "If Messrs Lyons had built this hotel on the south side of Oxford Street, I could have had a drink until eleven o’clock at night."

On 12 December 1933, the day the hotel opened for business, the Daily Express reported that "the majestic Cumberland Hotel... opens its doors to its first guests to-day" and was already famous. The Western Daily Press stated that a staff of some two thousand had been employed to look after guests and that the new hotel "has shown the world that British brains, enterprise and skill have yet to find their match".

A further house-warming took place on the opening day, with Salmon welcoming "a large and influential party of guests". The Leeds Mercury commented drily on the day that "London people will regard the new Cumberland Hotel at the Marble Arch as an acquisition to be proud of, but the clientele will come mainly from the Provinces and overseas." However, the paper reported the next day that more than a thousand people had had lunch at the hotel on its first day, and within half an hour of the doors opening six women were visiting the hairdressing rooms to have work done on their hair.

== Notable events ==
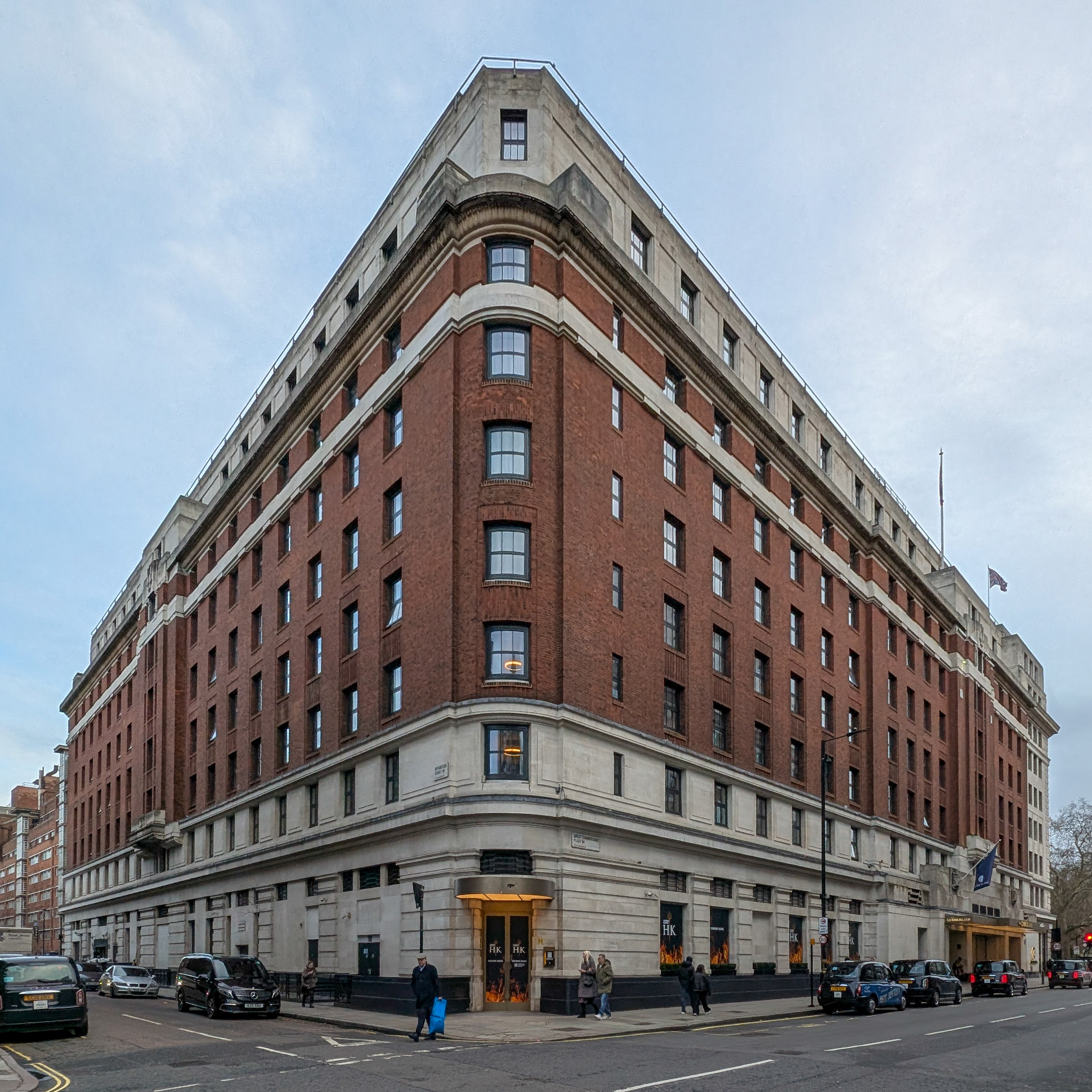
The corner of the hotel where Great Cumberland Place meets Bryanston Street

In May 1940, during the Second World War, Tyler Kent, a clerk at the Embassy of the United States in London who was stealing secret papers, used the hotel for meetings with an agent of German intelligence.

Also in 1940, the artist Paul Nash stayed at the hotel and painted several watercolours.

Alma Cogan was a resident singer at the hotel for two years. In 1949, she was talent-spotted there by Walter Ridley.

On 11 September 1970, Jimi Hendrix gave his last interview in his suite at the Cumberland Hotel. He visited his suite on the day of his death, a week later.

The Supremes planned new choreography for their show in the basement.

Gary Rhodes opened his restaurant Rhodes W1 within the hotel in May 2007.

== See also ==
- List of largest hotels in Europe
