= Louie Gong =

Canadian artist, activist, educator

Louie Gong (born August 8, 1974) is a Canadian American visual artist, activist, public speaker, educator, and entrepreneur. His work focuses on Indigenous and multiracial identity, exploring race and identity through art, and expanding business leadership and capacity for Native artists.

== Early life and education ==
Gong was born in Ruskin, British Columbia and is Native American (Nooksack), Chinese, French and Scottish with Squamish Nation ancestry. He was raised by his grandparents, father and stepmother in Ruskin, B.C. and later in the Nooksack tribal community in Washington State.

Gong graduated from Western Washington University with a master's degree in school counseling and worked as a child and family therapist, first with youth from his own tribal community in the public school system. He later became a school counselor in the North Kitsap School District before moving into higher education at the University of Washington and administration at Muckleshoot Tribal College. Gong founded Eighth Generation in 2006 and has been an independent artist and entrepreneur since 2012.

== Career ==
=== Art ===
Gong is the founder of the company Eighth Generation. The company began as a way for Gong to sell his own art, which merged traditional Coast Salish art and icons from popular culture to make statements about identity. However, he strategically focused on product development and e-commerce rather than working through galleries. In doing so, he established a blueprint for a generations of Native American artists interested in bringing authentic art to mainstream business. He also launched the Inspired Natives Project, with the motto "Inspired Natives, not Native-inspired", in 2014 to model respectful ways of aligning with Native artists, aesthetics, and culture—while building the capacity of emerging Native arts entrepreneurs. His first artist collaboration under the Inspired Natives Project was with Acoma Pueblo artist Michelle Lowden, followed by a collaboration with Anishinaabe artist and organizer Sarah Agaton Howes.. Since 2014, Eighth Generation has collaborated with over 50 Native American artists.

Gong established the Decolonizing Partnerships business model to provide a framework for companies interested in ethical collaboration with Native American artists and Native-owned companies. His 2021 collaboration with Starbucks Reserve was the first project launched under these guidelines.

In 2011, Gong collaborated with Manitobah Mukluks to design the "LG Gatherer", a limited edition boot that sold out of numerous production runs. Louie has also collaborated with Paul Frank Industries on an original design for tote bags, pillows and blankets. In 2012, Gong partnered with the Smithsonian Institution's National Museum of the American Indian (NMAI) to explore issues of identity, community and mixed heritage through "Design Yourself: IAMNMAI" workshops, using his customizable art toy, Mockups. In 2021, Gong collaborated with Starbucks to create a limited edition product line for Starbucks Reserve. In 2022, he collaborated with Brooks Running to launch a Sasquatch-themed trail running shoe and product line. In 2024, he collaborated with the Bruce Lee Foundation to create 2 Bruce Lee-themed murals for Seattle's Chinatown-International District. In 2024, Gong's major public art installation at the Spring District Light Rail Station in Bellevue was revealed. In 2025, he guided the Seattle Sounders through ethical collaboration with local Native-American artists in creation of their 2025 Community Kit Jersey.

Gong sold Eighth Generation to the Snoqualmie Tribe in 2019 and retired from his role as CEO in 2022.

Gong is frequently recognized in inspirational stories. He is also widely regarded as one of the most successful Native American artists in history.

Gong has also exhibited at or had artistic partnerships with the Smithsonian National Museum of the American Indian, American Museum of Natural History, Harvard's Peabody Essex Museum, Portland Art Museum, Seattle Art Museum, the Wing Luke Museum of the Asian Pacific American Experience, and the DePaul Art Museum.

=== Activism ===
Gong has been a key leader in the movement against cultural appropriation since 2007. Through his work at Eighth Generation, consumer education, frequent public speaking and workshops, Gong help kick off an ongoing movement that has transformed an economic environment once dominated by corporate exploitation of cultural art through the use of fake Native art into one where collaboration is expected and Native American artists are respected as entrepreneurs. His work has redirected millions of dollars away from corporations using fake Native art to Native American artists and Native American owned businesses.

Prior to founding Eighth Generation, was a recognized leader in the national activism around what was then called the mixed race movement. This work started in 2003, when Gong began organizing Bone Marrow Donor Registration Drives in collaboration with Mavin Foundation. Gong was board president of the Mavin Foundation, a national non-profit organization that raises awareness about mixed race people and families, from 2007 to 2009. He was a co-developer of the Mixed Heritage Centerduring this time.

Gong's activism about social and political issues affecting Native and mixed race people has been featured in media such as The New York Times, NBC Nightly News and MSNBC.com, Native Peoples Magazine, Native Max Magazine, and the Indian Country Today Media Network.

In 2023, Gong was appointed to the US Senate's Curatorial Advisory Board by Washington Senator Patty Murray.

== Films ==
Gong's merging of art and activism has been the subject of UNRESERVED: the Work of Louie Gong, a Longhouse Media film that screened at film festivals including Festival De Cannes and National Geographic's All Roads Film Festival, and Schuhe Machen Leute, a 2013 documentary produced in Germany.

Gong was commissioned by costume designer Ruth Carter to design blankets for Black Panther: Wakanda Forever. His blankets also appeared in Killers of the Flower Moon, and was worn by Lily Gladstone on the cover of British Vogue during the promotion for the film
