= Serious Pie =

Pizza chain in the Seattle metropolitan area, U.S.

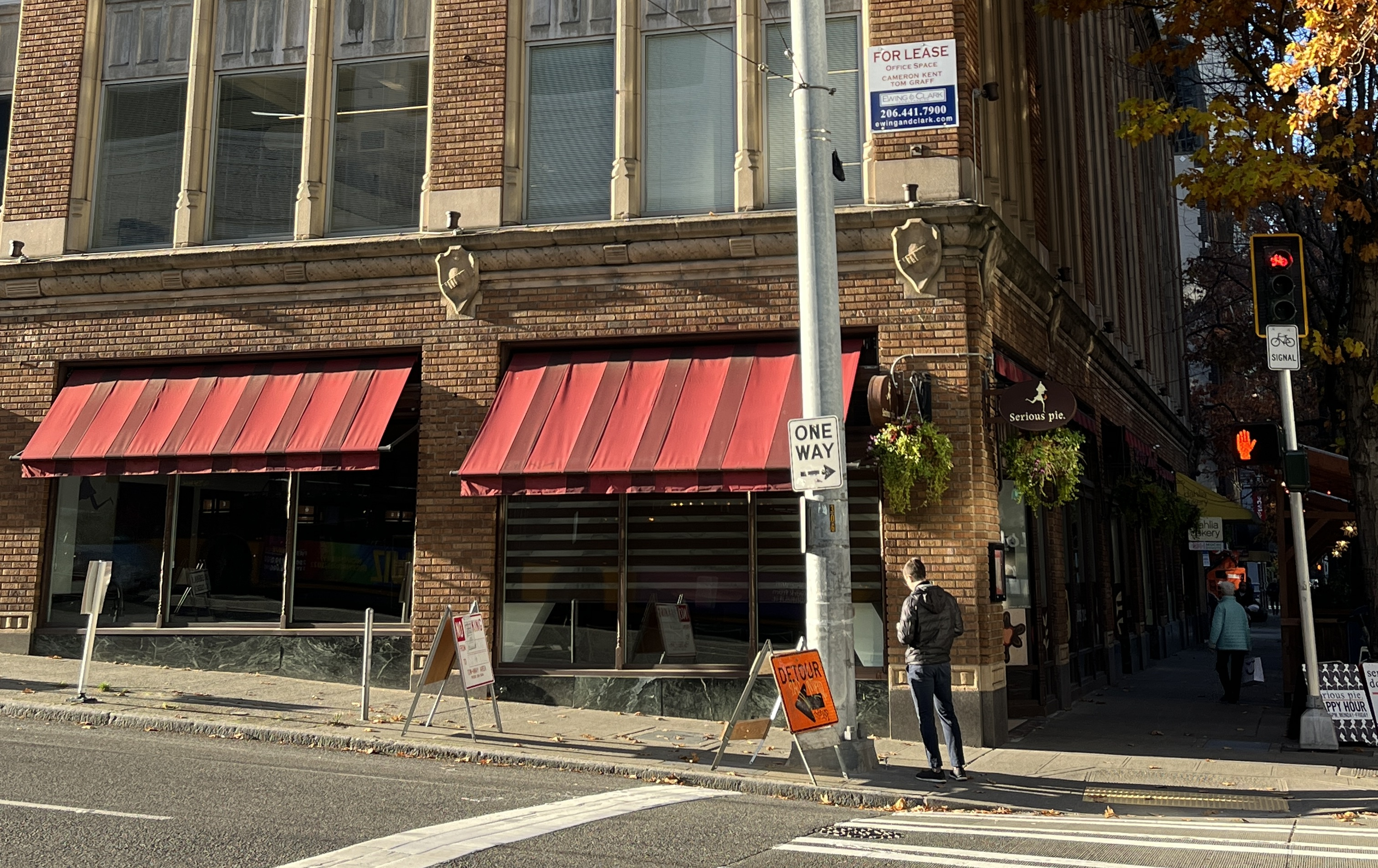
- Exterior of the restaurant in Seattle's Belltown neighborhood, 2022

Restaurant information
- Location: Washington, United States
- Website: seriouspieseattle.com

Serious Pie is a pizzeria with multiple locations in the Seattle metropolitan area, in the U.S. state of Washington. Operated by Tom Douglas, Serious Pie has been described as "arguably [his] most successful brand".

== Description ==
Serious Pie is a pizza chain with multiple locations in the Seattle metropolitan area. In Seattle, the business has operated in the Ballard, Belltown and South Lake Union neighborhoods, and inside the Starbucks Reserve Roastery on Capitol Hill. The Belltown restaurant is attached to Dahlia Bakery in the space which previously housed Douglas' Dahlia Lounge. Serious Pie has also operated in Kirkland's The Village at Totem Lake.

Serious Pie serves thin, wood-fired pizzas. Varieties have included the Yukon Gold Potato Pizza. The business has also used "unconventional" ingredients such as clams, nettles, soft eggs and truffle cheese.

== Reception ==
Donald Olson of Frommer's has rated the downtown Seattle restaurant two out of three stars. The Not for Tourists Guide to Seattle has said the food is "worth the potentially long wait".

== See also ==
- List of pizza chains of the United States
