= B. Smith =

American restaurateur, TV personality (1949–2020)

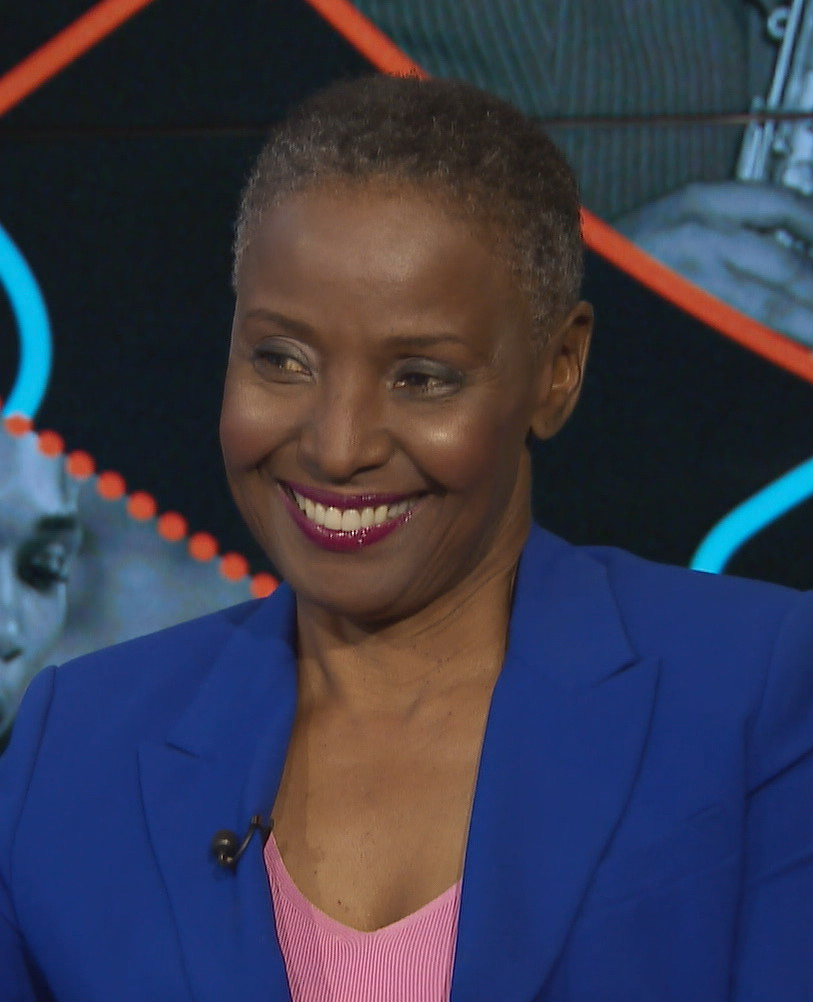
- Smith in 2016
- Born: Barbara Elaine Smith; August 24, 1949; Everson, Pennsylvania, U.S.
- Died: February 22, 2020 (aged 70); Long Island, New York, U.S
- Education: Southmoreland High School
- Occupations: Restaurateur; model; author; television host; businesswoman
- Years active: 1973–2015
- Known for: First African-American model featured on Mademoiselle magazine (1976)
- Spouses: Donald Anderson (m. 1986; div. 1990) Dan Gasby (m. 1992)
- Culinary career
- Cooking style: Global eclectic with Southern influences
- Previous restaurants: B. Smith Union Station; B. Smith Restaurant Row; B. Smith Sag Harbor (Long Island, NY)
- Television show: B. Smith with Style
- Website: bsmith.com

Barbara Elaine Smith (August 24, 1949 – February 22, 2020), professionally known as B. Smith, was an American restaurateur, model, author, businesswoman, and television host.

== Early life and education ==
Smith was born on August 24, 1949, in the Pittsburgh suburb of Everson, Pennsylvania. Her mother, Florence, was a maid and her father, William, a steelworker. Smith was raised in Scottdale, Pennsylvania, and attended Southmoreland High School, graduating in 1967. In high school, the Future Homemakers of America club, while supposedly integrated, refused to let Smith join because of her race; she countered by starting her own homemaking club with herself as president.

== Career ==
=== Modeling, television, and stage ===
In the mid-1960s, Smith began her career in modeling, participating in the Ebony Fashion Fair and later signing with the Wilhelmina Models agency. Smith was the first African-American model to be featured on the cover of Mademoiselle magazine in 1976.

Smith made two appearances on the children's television series Mister Rogers' Neighborhood, once as a model for Queen Sara's wedding dress, and once giving a tour of her restaurant, B. Smith, and making raspberry custard with Fred Rogers and her head chef, Henry. During the episode, she taught child viewers about the importance of washing hands, and shared the excitement of using huge bowls and mixers. She said her dream was to feed people, which began at an early age when she fed her dolls. Her weekly half-hour syndicated television show, B. Smith with Style, debuted in 1997 and also aired weekdays on BTN and Bounce TV. It featured home decor and cooking segments.

Smith appeared as herself on "Prelude to a Kiss", a 1999 episode of the sitcom Sabrina the Teenage Witch, in which Aunt Hilda summons her in order to teach a group of unruly pirates to keep house.

In 2011, Smith accepted a role in the Off-Broadway play Love, Loss, and What I Wore for an April 27 – May 29 run with Conchata Ferrell, AnnaLynne McCord, Anne Meara, and Minka Kelly.

=== Restaurateur and retailer ===
Smith owned multiple restaurants called B. Smith. The first opened in 1986, on Eighth Avenue at 47th Street in New York City, and several years later moved around the corner to Restaurant Row on 46th Street; followed by another one in Sag Harbor, Long Island, New York. She also owned a restaurant in the historic Beaux-Arts Union Station in Washington, D.C.; in September 2013, it was reported that restaurant would close. In 2014, the Sag Harbor restaurant was shuttered, followed by the Manhattan location in January 2015.

Smith's interest in décor and restaurant design led to the development of her first home collection, which debuted at Bed, Bath & Beyond in Spring 2001. She also launched a line of serveware in 2004. In spring 2010, Smith debuted her first furniture collection with the La-Z-Boy company Clayton Marcus.

=== Author ===
B. Smith authored three books concentrating on recipes and presentation: B. Smith's Entertaining and Cooking for Friends (1995), B. Smith's Rituals and Celebrations (1999), and B. Smith Cooks Southern Style (2009). Smith and her husband released Before I Forget in early 2016, detailing their journey following her diagnosis of early-onset Alzheimer's. The book was written with husband Dan Gasby and Vanity Fair contributing editor Michael Shnayerson.

== Personal life ==
Smith married twice. Her first marriage was to former HBO executive Donald "Don" Anderson from 1986 until 1990. Smith began dating Anderson after formally meeting him at her restaurant in late 1986. Smith married Dan Gasby in 1992 at St. Luke's Lutheran Church in Manhattan. Gasby was the executive producer of the Essence Awards and the senior vice president of marketing at Camelot Entertainment Sales Inc. Smith was stepmother of Gasby's daughter, Dana.

Smith lived in Sag Harbor, New York, on Long Island, until she and Dan Gasby moved to nearby East Hampton, in the mid-2010s. She previously lived on Central Park South and had a second apartment she used as an office.

== Illness and death ==
In June 2014, Smith revealed that she had been diagnosed with early-onset Alzheimer's disease, and stated that she was disclosing the information to counter the stigma associated with the disease. In November 2014, Smith's husband reported her missing from Southampton, New York. She was found the next day in a cafe in Midtown Manhattan.

On February 22, 2020, Smith died of early-onset Alzheimer's disease at the age of 70.
