= Dahlia Lounge =

Defunct restaurant in Seattle, Washington, U.S.

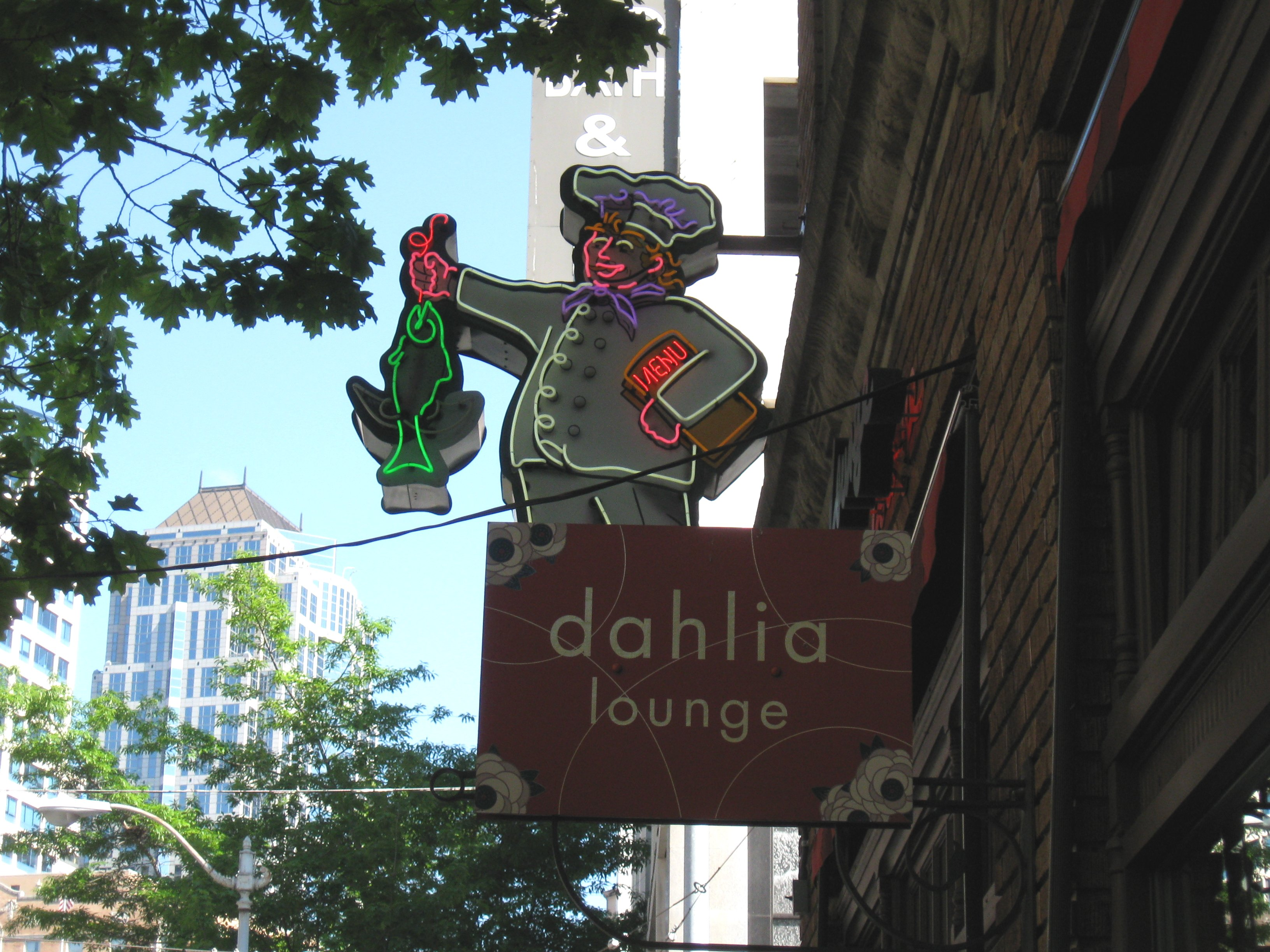
- The restaurant's exterior

Restaurant information
- Location: Seattle, King, Washington, United States
- Coordinates: 47°36′47″N 122°20′25″W

Dahlia Lounge was a restaurant by Tom Douglas in Seattle, in the U.S. state of Washington. The business operated from 1989 to 2021. It was replaced with Serious Pie, another business by Tom Douglas.

Gabe Guarente of Eater Seattle wrote, "Dahlia Lounge was the restaurant that launched Douglas's culinary empire. Its inventive approach to Pacific Northwest fare and mix of global influences marked a touchstone for Seattle's growing downtown dining scene in the 90s, and helped Douglas earn a James Beard Awards in 1994, among other accolades. Menu favorites changed over the decades, but one unforgettable mainstay was the restaurant’s triple coconut cream pie, which remains a Seattle dessert icon."

== See also ==
- List of defunct restaurants of the United States
- List of Pacific Northwest restaurants
