= Rhodes W1 =

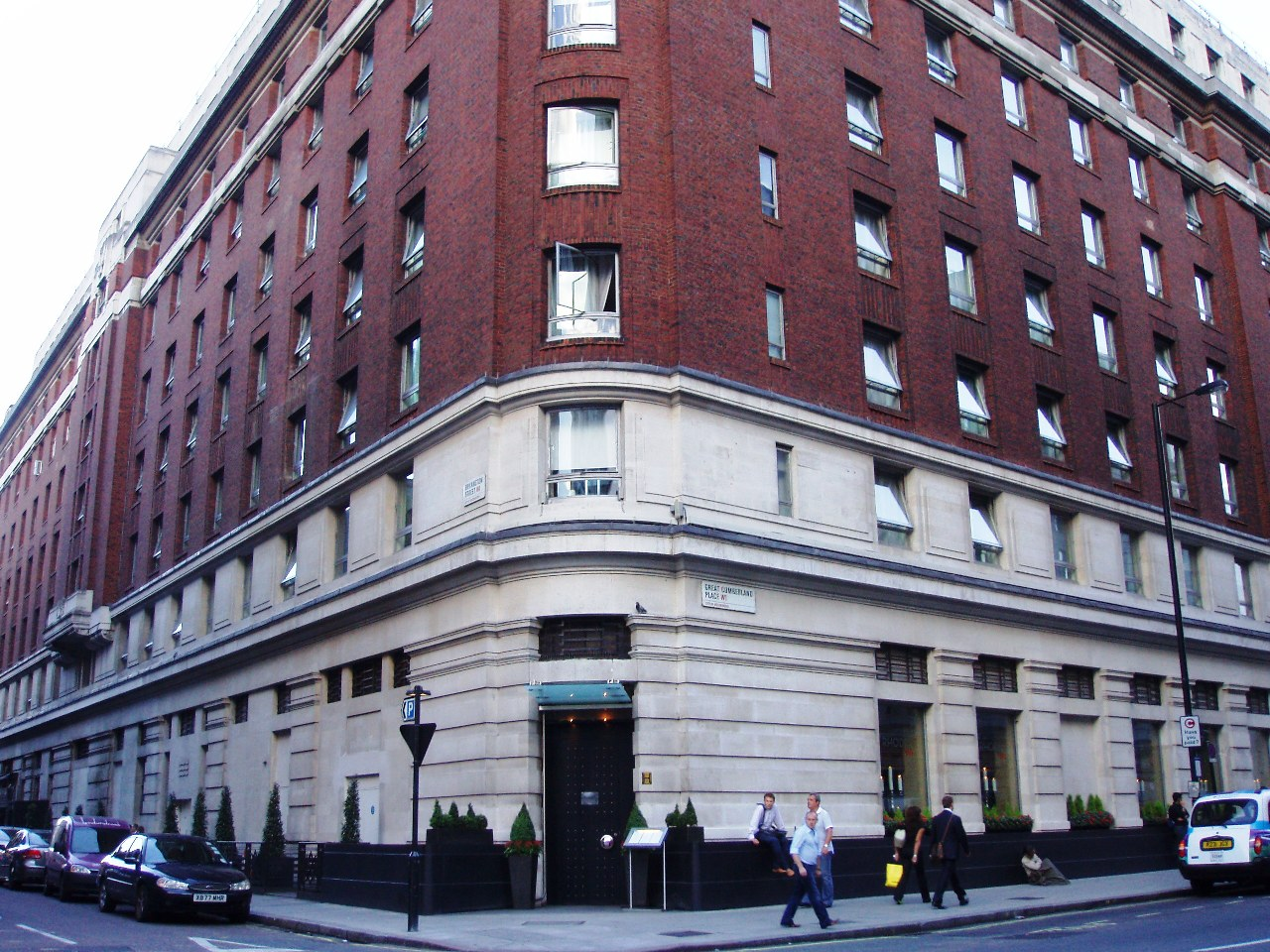
- Rhodes W1 at the Cumberland Hotel, London

- Location within Central London

Restaurant information
- Chef: Gary Rhodes
- Food type: Haute cuisine
- Dress code: Formal
- Rating: (Michelin Guide 2008)
- Location: Marble Arch, London, England
- Coordinates: 51°30′50″N 0°9′32″W
- Seating capacity: 45 covers
- Reservations: Now closed

Rhodes W1 was a restaurant located in London, England. Opened in 2007, it gained a Michelin star within a year of opening in January 2008. It served European cuisine, and was one of two Rhodes restaurants in London to hold a Michelin star. It closed on 28 September 2012.

== Description ==
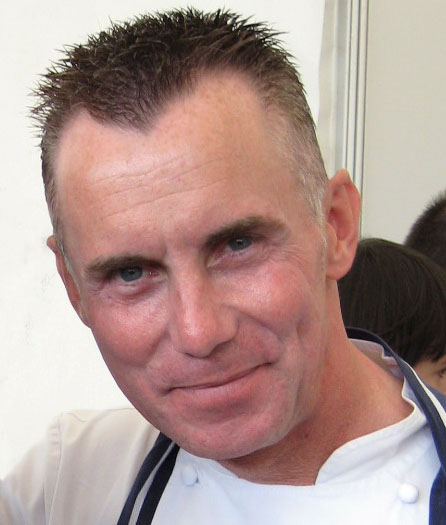
On launch, Gary Rhodes signaled his intention to challenge for Michelin stars with Rhodes W1

Rhodes W1 opened on 18 May 2007, and was located at the ground floor of the Cumberland Hotel (now Great Cumberland Place) at Bryanson Street and Great Cumberland Place in London. It was separate from the similar named Rhodes W1 Brasserie in the same hotel, also now closed. It was a European cuisine restaurant based along the same lines as Rhodes 24, with the other restaurant serving British food. Kelly Hoppen was the designer for the interior of the restaurant.

On launch, Rhodes announced his intention to improve on his five separate single Michelin stars he had previously won, "I really want the Michelin inspectors to come here and recognise that it's more refined than anything I've done in the past." Within a year of opening, it was awarded a Michelin star in January 2008, which it retains to date as one of two Michelin starred restaurants for Gary Rhodes in London.

While Gary Rhodes had promised to be present in the kitchen whenever he could, the head chef on launch was Brian Hughson. Hughson had previously worked with Rhodes at Rhodes in the Square in the late 1990s.

It reopened in Dubai.

== Reception ==
Giles Coren reviewed Rhodes W1 for The Times in 2007, describing the food served as "like a mini-smorgasbord of flavours". While he criticized that many items on the menu carried supplementary charges which brought up the price of the bill, he suggested that it simply made the restaurant more suitable for a celebratory meal. Terry Durack also reviewed the restaurant in 2007, for The Independent; he gave it an overall score of seventeen out of twenty, summing the restaurant up as "Rhodes W1 shows that the chef's chef can bring a lighter, modern, touch to his almost anal brand of food perfectionism. I knew Rhodes was good. I didn't know he was this good." Marina O'Loughlin gave the restaurant three out of five stars while reviewing it for the Metro, while warning people when visiting to avoid the similarly named brasserie. Time Out reviewed the restaurant in 2009, giving it four out of five stars. The review described the service as "flawless" and thought that the restaurant "holds much promise".
