= Dahlia Bakery =

Bakery in Seattle, Washington, U.S.

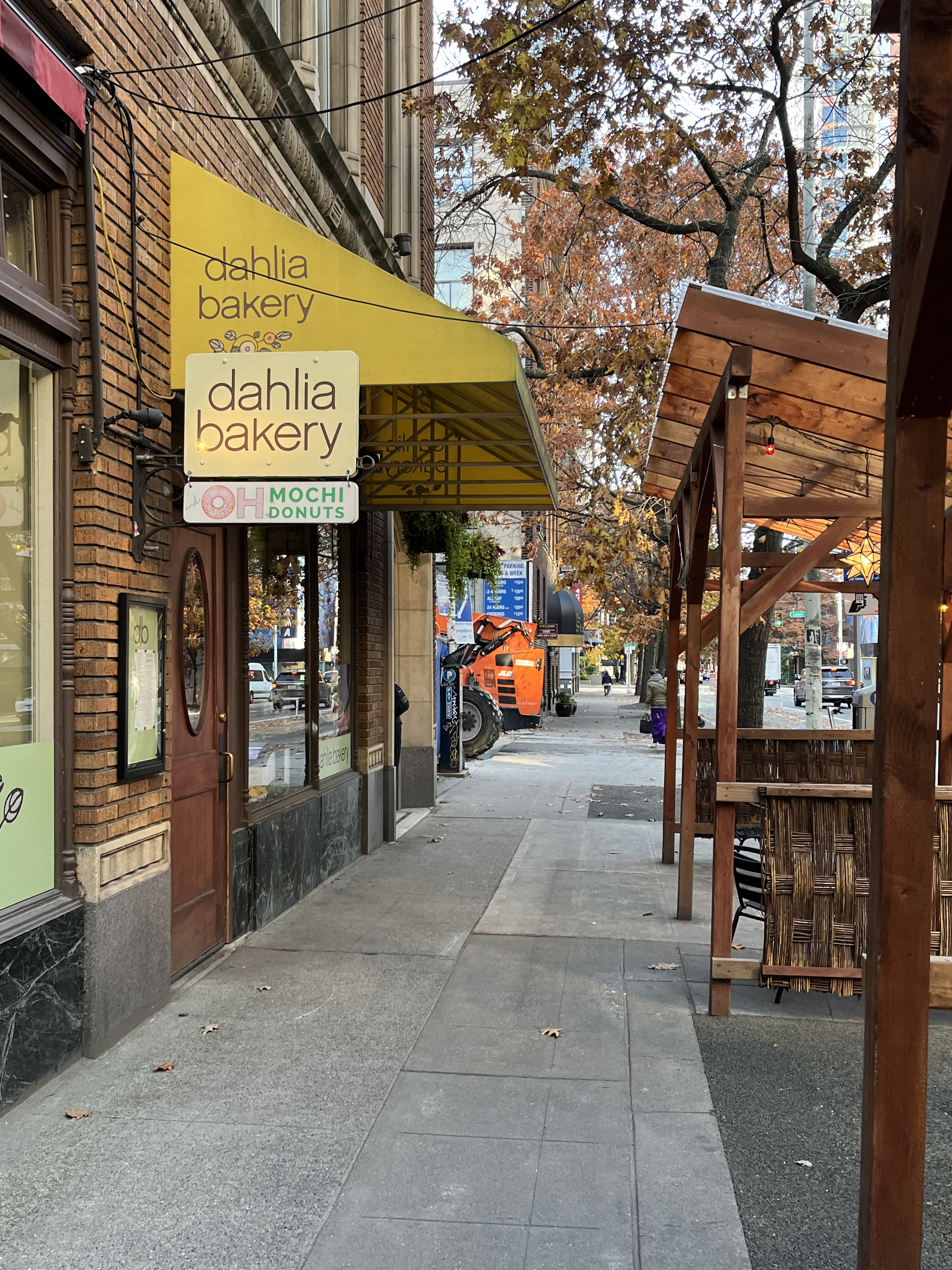
- The bakery's exterior, 2022
- Interactive map of Dahlia Bakery

Restaurant information
- Location: 2001 4th Avenue, Seattle, King, Washington, 98121, United States
- Coordinates: 47°36′47.2″N 122°20′25.8″W

Dahlia Bakery is a pastry shop in Seattle's Belltown neighborhood, in the U.S. state of Washington.

== Description ==
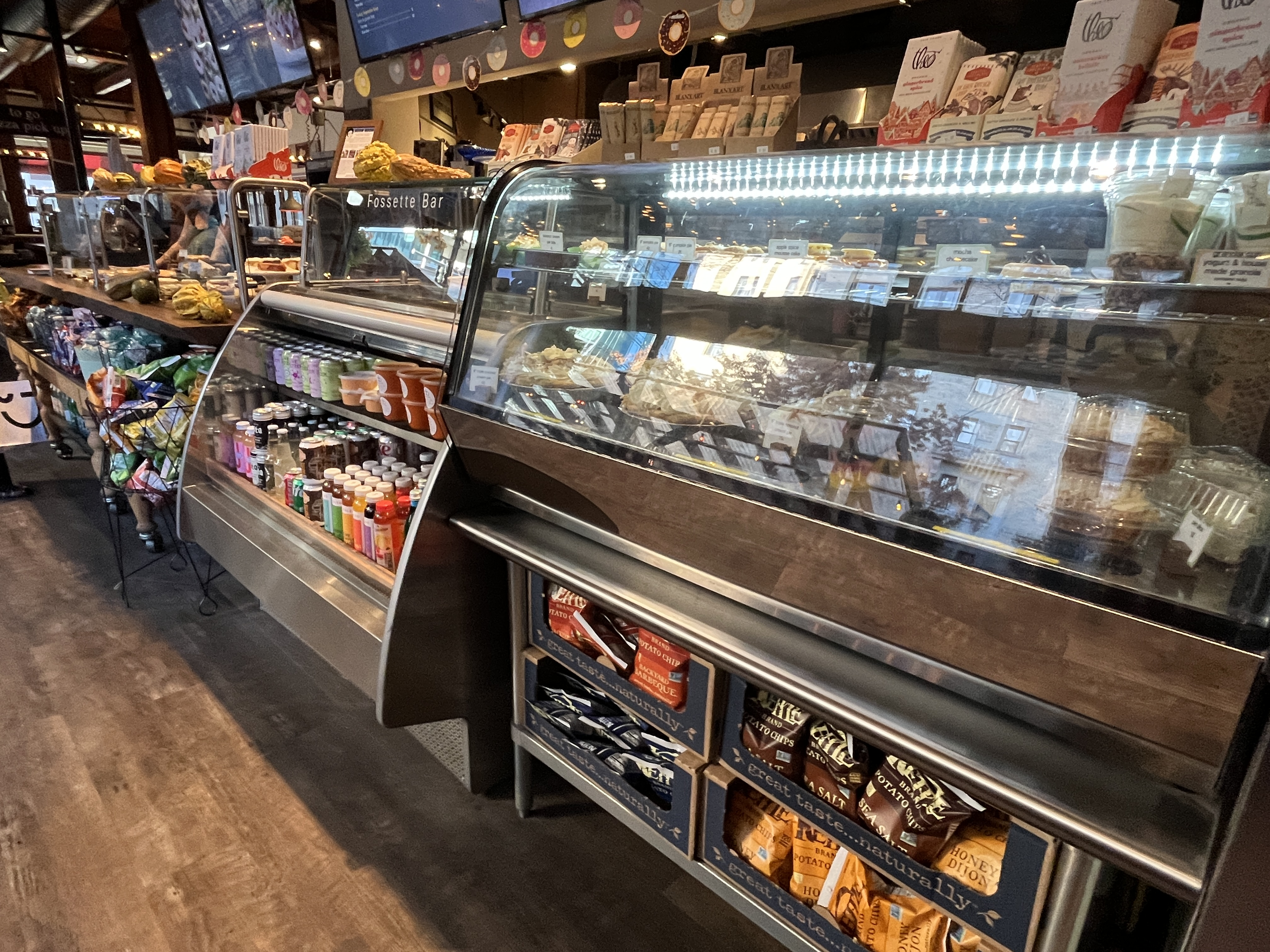
Interior, 2022

Dahlia Bakery is a bakery and pastry shop in Seattle's Belltown neighborhood, operated by Tom Douglas. The business serves bread, sandwiches (including breakfast sandwiches), and pastries for breakfast and lunch. According to the Food Network, "This bakery serves up a triple coconut cream pie that keeps the crowds coming back for more. The pie has coconut in the crust, shredded coconut and coconut milk in the creamy filling, and toasted coconut on top, along with curls of white chocolate. It’s available as a whole 9-inch (230 mm) pie, a baby pie, a slice of pie or a coco pie 'bite.'"

== Reception ==
Adam H. Callaghan of Eater Seattle said the Triple Coconut Cream Pie is "a dessert so famous, President Obama asks for it by name, and seems to have it at every Seattle fundraiser he hosts". The Seattle Post-Intelligencer included the pie in a 2021 list of 26 "iconic Seattle bites". Allecia Vermillion included the business in Seattle Metropolitan's 2022 overview of "exceptional" breakfast sandwiches.

== See also ==
- List of bakeries
