= Loulay (restaurant) =

Defunct restaurant in Seattle, Washington, U.S.

Loulay Kitchen and Bar
- Interactive map of Loulay Kitchen and Bar

Restaurant information
- Established: 2013
- Location: 600 Union St, Seattle, King, Washington, 98101, United States
- Coordinates: 47°36′37.5″N 122°20′0.5″W

Loulay Kitchen and Bar, or simply Loulay, was a restaurant by Thierry Rautureau in Seattle, in the U.S. state of Washington.

== Description ==
The French menu included French onion soup, duck confit sliders, roasted chicken, and braised short ribs.

== History ==
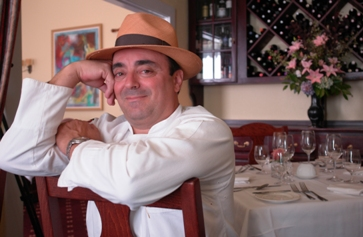
Thierry Rautureau

The restaurant opened in 2013. Loulay closed in March 2020, following the arrival of the COVID-19 pandemic in Seattle, and never reopened. Thierry Rautureau made the closure permanent in August 2021.

== Reception ==
The restaurant was dubbed "Best Restaurant of the year" by Seattle Metropolitan. Thrillist gave it accolades as one of "The 21 best new restaurants in America", and "Seattle's 11 best new restaurants of 2014". Its burger was dubbed "Seattle's 10 best new burgers of 2014".

== See also ==
- List of defunct restaurants of the United States
- List of French restaurants
