= Tracy Rector =

American film producer

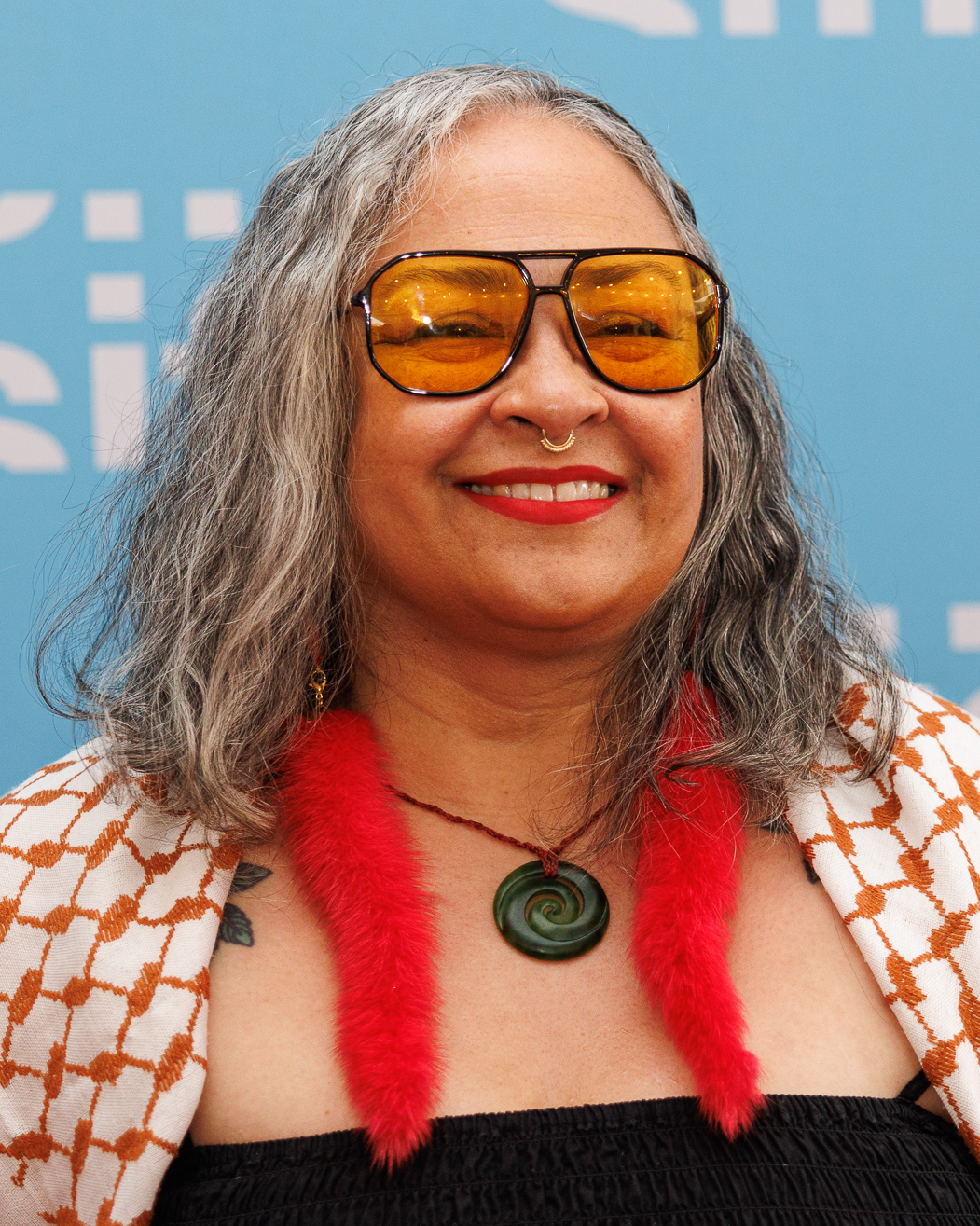
- Rector in 2025
- Born: 1972 (age 53–54)
- Education: Evergreen State College
- Occupations: Film Director, Film Producer, Curator
- Children: 2

Tracy Rector (born 1972) is an American filmmaker, curator, and arts advocate based in Seattle, Washington. She is the executive director and co-founder of Longhouse Media, an Indigenous and POC media arts organization and home of the nationally acclaimed program Native Lens. She has worked as an education consultant at the Seattle Art Museum, as a native naturalist for the Olympic Sculpture Park, and has developed curriculum for IslandWood, an environmental education center.

She served as a Seattle Arts Commissioner and was the 2017 curator of the Seattle Theatre Group's Re:definition Gallery.

== Career ==
Tracy Rector earned her BA in Native American studies and communications from Evergreen State College and her master's degree in education and teacher certification from Antioch University’s First Peoples Program. Her focus was collaborative media and identity exploration with at-risk Native youth. Her first feature project, Teachings of the Tree People: The Work of Bruce Miller, brought oral tradition into a contemporary storytelling format while also identifying how Coast Salish communities wanted to be involved in the filmmaking process. Her second feature-length film was the documentary March Point, a collaboration with Longhouse Media co-founder Annie Silverstein and three young Swinomish filmmakers. This environmental documentary received an All Roads Film Project Seed Grant and was recognized by UNESCO as an example of indigenous grassroots mobilization in response to climate change. Rector's work has been screened at the Cannes Film Festival, imagineNATIVE Film + Media Arts Festival, National Geographic's All Roads Film Project, Toronto International Film Festival, the Seattle Art Museum and in the Smithsonian's Museum of the American Indian, and has been nationally broadcast on the PBS film series Independent Lens.

Rector has served as a curriculum advisor for the Seattle Art Museum, assisting in planning for the museum's expanded Native American wing and the international exhibition S'abadeb—The Gifts: Pacific Coast Salish Art and Artists. She has also worked as a native naturalist for the Olympic Sculpture Park and developed curriculum for IslandWood, an environmental education center in Bainbridge Island, Washington. Rector has 2 sons, Chai and Solomon.

== Selected filmography ==
=== As producer ===
- Teachings of the Tree People (2006)
- Giving Thanks (2007)
- March Point (2008)
- Canoe Pulling: A Lummi Way of Life (2008)
- Bunky Echo Hawk: Profile of a Proactive Artist (2009)
- UNRESERVED: The Work of Louie Gong (2010)
- Dos Almas (2013)
- Ronnie BoDean (2015)
- Maiden of Deception Pass: Guardian of Her Samish People (2015)
- Cedar Box Stories (2017)
- Dawnland (2018)
- Manzanar Diverted (2021)
- Outta the Muck (TBD 2021)
- Sweetheart Deal (2021)

=== As director ===
- Teachings of the Tree People (2006)
- Giving Thanks (2007)
- March Point (2008)
- Bunky Echo Hawk: Profile of a Proactive Artist (2009)
- UNRESERVED: The Work of Louie Gong (2010)
- Samish Canoe Journey (2014)
- Maiden of Deception Pass: Guardian of Her Samish People (2015)
- Ch'aak' S'aagi / Eagle Bone - VR (2016)
- Cedar Box Stories (2017)

== Awards and honors ==
- 2008: Horace Mann Award
- 2008: Best Feature Documentary Award - ImagineNATIVE
- 2009: National Association for Media Literacy for outstanding contributions made in the field of media education
- 2011: Sundance Institute Lab Fellow
- 2014: Tribeca All Access Grantee
- 2016: Best New Digital Media Award - ImagineNATIVE
- 2016: The Stranger Genius Award
- 2017: Firelight Media Impact Producer Fellow
