= Thierry Rautureau =

American celebrity chef (1958/1959 – 2023)

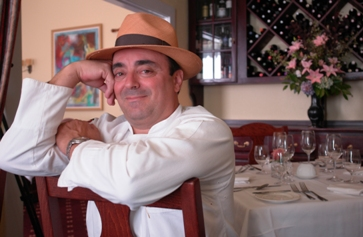
- Born: 1958/1959
- Died: October 29, 2023 (aged 64)
- Occupations: Chef and restaurant owner
- Known for: Contestant on Top Chef Masters: Seasons 2 & 4; Co-Host of “In The Kitchen with Tom and Thierry” with Chef Tom Douglas
- Culinary career
- Previous restaurants
- Loulay Kitchen & Bar; Luc's Restaurant; Rover's Restaurant
- Awardss
- Best Chef in the Pacific Northwest from The James Beard Foundation (1998); Chevalier de l’Ordre Du Mérite Agricole from The French Government (2004)
- Website: thechefinthehat.com (archived from the original on 02 June 2023)

Thierry Rautureau (1958/1959 – October 29, 2023), nicknamed The Chef in the Hat, was a French-American celebrity chef based in Seattle, Washington. He was also the chef and owner of several former restaurants, including Loulay and Luc.

Rautureau apprenticed in Anjou, France, and at twenty moved to the United States to work at several fine restaurants. He became the chef/owner of Rover's Restaurant in 1987, and before closing its doors in 2013 it helped make him one of the most recognizable chefs around Seattle. Rautureau has won various awards including the James Beard Award for Best Chef in the Pacific Northwest in 1998, and has been awarded the Chevalier de l’Ordre Du Mérite Agricole by the French government.

In 2010, Rautureau opened Luc, a French-American café and bar in Madison Valley. This was followed by Loulay Kitchen & Bar in 2013, a French-inspired restaurant that balanced the upscale Rover's with country-style cooking that he enjoyed growing up on the farm in France. Both restaurants closed in 2021, following difficulties with the COVID-19 pandemic, as the chef entered "semi-retirement".

Rautureau cooked for such well-known figures as Hillary Clinton, Francis Ford Coppola, Jackson Browne, and Julia Child.

== Early life ==
Rautureau was raised in the town of Saint-Hilaire-de-Loulay in the Muscadet region of France. His parents were farmers in a small agricultural community where the cows and chickens outnumbered the people. The family cooked only what they grew, thus providing a purely seasonal diet. As the oldest child, Rautureau was given the chore of doing the prep for dinner; and as such he quickly became acquainted with fresh homegrown ingredients at a young age.

== Early career ==
At fourteen, Rautureau started a cooking apprenticeship in Anjou, France and at sixteen went on a Regional Tour de France and trained in the cities of Le Mont Saint Michel in Normandy, Chamonix in the French Alps, and Hendaye in the Pays Basque. At twenty, after six years of traditional French training, Rautureau headed for the United States and took his professional experience to La Fontaine with Jean Claude Poilevey in Chicago. After three years in Chicago, Rautureau moved to Los Angeles where he worked at the Regency Club with Joachim Splichal, and then The Seventh Street Bistro with Laurent Quenioux.

== Restaurants ==
=== Rover's ===
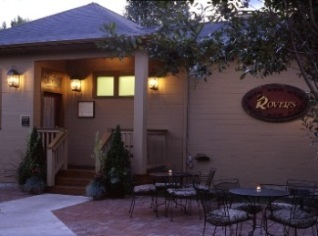
Rover's Restaurant

While visiting Seattle in 1987, Rautureau dined at Rover's and discovered that the restaurant was for sale. He decided to buy the restaurant so that he could express his culinary creativity as the chef/owner while enjoying the Pacific Northwest.

Rautureau said of his cooking philosophy: “it starts with freshness and continues with treating all ingredients with attention.” He identified the cuisine at Rover's as “Northwest contemporary with a French accent.” His cuisine also contained Mediterranean overtones and various Asian elements. Overall his cuisine is aligned with the philosophy of "food as art". Rover's closed its doors on June 23, 2013 as Rautureau prepared for "new opportunities".

=== Luc ===
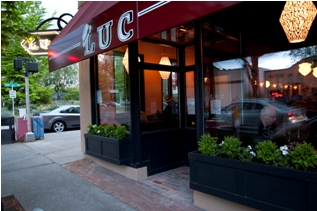
Luc Restaurant

In 2010, Rautureau opened Luc, a casual French-American café and bar named after his late father, Luc Rautureau. Being primarily local, seasonal and sustainable, Luc's food is heavily influenced by the French comfort food Rautureau grew up eating on his parents’ farm.

In order to raise money to open Luc, the established chef pre-sold gift certificates. Interested parties were offered three gift certificates valued at $435, which could be used over the course of three years for $1,000. The names of these "Founding Diners" are now featured in Luc on bronze plaques. The two paintings in the dining room were both artistic interpretations of old Rautureau family photographs, one of Rautureau as a boy and another of his parents as a young couple, which were rendered by a Seattle-based French artist named Isa Darleans.

Luc closed on August 28, 2021, following struggles with the COVID-19 pandemic and what Rautureau described as a "financially unsustainable lease".

=== Loulay ===
After closing Rover's in 2013, Chef Thierry Rautureau opened Loulay Kitchen & Bar in downtown Seattle, at the bottom of the Sheraton Hotel. Named for Chef Thierry Rautureau's hometown of Saint Hilaire de Loulay in France, Loulay served home-style French cuisine influenced by Pacific Northwest ingredients. The restaurant was dubbed "Best Restaurant of the year" by Seattle Met Magazine. Loulay closed in March of 2020, following the arrival of the COVID-19 pandemic in Seattle, and never reopened. Rautureau made the closure permanent in August 2021.

== Television and radio appearances ==
From 2003 to 2010, Rautureau was the co-host of the talk radio show “Seattle Kitchen" with fellow chef Tom Douglas on KIRO 97.3FM. The two chefs conducted interviews with people in the food world, recounted recipes, gave a wine of the week and discussed food in the news.

In 2012, Rautureau and Douglas returned to KIRO Radio with "Seattle Kitchen," heard Saturdays at 2pm and Sundays at 10am on 97.3 FM in Seattle. After a few months of ratings success, the show was extended to two hours.

On television, Rautureau was featured on the Food Network's “Dining Around” and “Ready, Set, Cook!," Ming Tsai's “Simply Ming,” the PBS Series “French Fest," and the Discovery Channel series “Great Chefs from the Great Cities." Rautureau has also been a celebrity chef judge for the PBS series MasterChef USA.

Rautureau's most well-known television appearance is as a contestant on the second season of the Bravo reality series Top Chef Masters. Rautureau competed against Monica Pope (T'afia), Carmen González (Chef Consultant), David Burke (David Burke Townhouse), and the eventual winner of the season, Marcus Samuelsson (Red Rooster, Aquavit) in the second episode entitled "Top Chef Masters Season 2: It's My Party." The challenge for the chefs was to cook a meal inspired by soul food for actor Mekhi Phifer's birthday party. González and Samuelsson advanced, while Pope, Rautureau and Burke were eliminated.

In 2012, Rautureau returned as a contestant on season four of Top Chef Masters. He made it to the fifth round before being eliminated.

In July 2013, Chef Rautureau participated in the making of reality YouTube series, Kitchen Circus. Three home cooks make one course for 45 diners. Chef Thierry Rautureau guides contestants from cooking through service. Will it be Angel, Siri or Beth who makes the diner's favorite course? Celebrity Guests include: Tom Douglas (Seattle Restaurateur), Steve Scher (NPR Radio Host), Marty Riemer (Radio Host). The series had a total of 4 episodes concluded with a finale. Watch all the episodes, here.

TV programming channel KCTS9 produced a behind-the-scenes interview with Chef Thierry Rautureau which was put out on Nov. 3, 2014. Take a look at the full interview.

== Community involvement ==
Rautureau served on the Board of Directors for Food Lifeline, a Western Washington non-profit that provides food to 675,000 people through food banks, hot meal programs, shelters, and more. Rautureau also participated in various other community and charity events and fundraisers, such as the opening of the Dale Turner YMCA in Shoreline, WA. He was also on the board of "Visit Seattle" and "Alliance Française Seattle".

== Personal life and death ==
Rautureau was married to Kathleen Encell-Rautureau, a floral designer who also does arrangements for the restaurants. She was also the impetus for the chef's nickname. It was Kathy who gave Rautureau a fedora for Christmas, which he wore almost unceasingly. One evening, Rautureau entered the dining room at Rover's to speak with a guest without removing his hat. The guest exclaimed: “Look, it’s the Chef in the Hat!" Other guests overheard the comment, and the phrase eventually became his nickname. He trademarked the name the next day and has been recognized worldwide as "the Chef In The Hat".

Thierry Rautureau died on October 29, 2023, after a long battle with an autoimmune disease that affected his lungs. He was 64.

== Awards and recognition ==
From Rautureau opening Rover's in 1987, both the chef and his restaurants received local and national recognition from both press and industry critics. The James Beard Foundation nominated him as one of the "Best Chefs in America" in 1993, 1995, and 1997, before giving him the award in 1998, and he was a semifinalist for the organization's "Outstanding Chef" title in 2008. The French government awarded him the Chevalier de l’Ordre Du Mérite Agricole in 2004. Loulay Kitchen & Bar was named Best New Restaurant of 2014 by Seattle Metropolitan.

=== List of awards ===
==== 1990s ====
- Seattle Magazine: Restaurant of the Year, Readers’ Choice Award (1998)
- The Wine Spectator: Top Fine Dining Restaurant in Seattle (1998)
- Food & Wine: Best French Food in Seattle (September 1998)
- Nations Restaurant News: Fine Dining Hall of Fame Award (1998)
- The James Beard Foundation Awards: Best Chef in the Pacific Northwest (1998)
- Les Maitres Cuisiniers de France (induction) (1998)
- Seattle Magazine: Best Service, Readers’ Choice Award (1999)

==== 2000s ====
- Gourmet: Number One Top Seattle Choice (1996, 1998, 2000)
- Seattle Magazine: Best Overall, Critics’ Choice Award (2000, 2001)
- DiRoNA: Distinguished Dining Ambassador (2002)
- L’Ordre Du Mérite Agricole: Chevalier (2004)
- Washington Wine Restaurant Awards: Best Service (2004)
- Wine Spectator: Best of Award Of Excellence (2003, 2004, 2005)
- DiRoNa: Outstanding Food and Service (1997-2005)
- Top Ten Best: Seattle Magazine 2005
- Washington Wine Restaurant Awards: Best Washington Wine Reserve (2003-2005)
- Wine Spectator: Award Of Excellence (1997-2002, 2008)
- Mobil Travel Guide: Four Stars (1998-2008)
- American Automobile Association: Four Diamond Award (1998-2008)
- Zagat: Best Service in Seattle (2002-2009)
- Zagat: Seattle's Top Food (1993-2009)

==== 2010s ====
- Zagat: The 25 Most Important Restaurants of 2013
- Seattle Met: Best New Restaurant of 2014: Loulay (2014)
- Thrillist: Seattle's 10 best new burgers of 2014
- Thrillist: The 21 best new restaurants in America 2014 (2014)
- Thrillist: Seattle's 11 best new restaurants of 2014 (2014)
