= Longhouse Media =

US non-profit organization

- Formation: January 2005 by Tracy Rector and Annie Silverstein
- Location: Seattle, Washington state, United States
- Staff: 7
- Volunteers: 30
- Website: http://www.longhousemedia.org

Longhouse Media is a Washington state non-profit indigenous media arts organization, based in Seattle. It was established in January 2005 by Executive Director, Tracy Rector and former Artistic Director, Annie Silverstein, with the support of the Swinomish Indian Tribal Community. Longhouse Media supports the use of today's technologies by indigenous people and communities as a tool for self-expression, cultural preservation, and social change. Longhouse Media counts 4 full-time and 3 part-time staff, 30 active volunteers, and 8 board members. Among the founding board members is award-winning author, playwright and poet Sherman Alexie, from the Spokane/Coeur d'Alene Tribes.

== Media arts work ==
Central to Longhouse Media is its commitment to providing youth the skills necessary to tell their own stories through digital media. Its youth media program 'Native Lens' brings digital media training to Native youth in rural and urban settings and teaches filmmaking to Native youth as a form of inquiry, community development, and cultural pride and preservation. Native Lens was the recipient of the 2007 Seattle Mayor's Award. In 2009, the monthly television show Native Lens TV was launched. Since 2005 Longhouse Media has worked with a documented 1500 youth and 31 separate tribes. Productions by Longhouse Media include the feature-length documentary March Point which aired nationally on the award-winning PBS series Independent Lens and the short film UNRESERVED: The Work of Louie Gong about Seattle-based artist and activist Louie Gong.

Each year Longhouse Media partners with the Seattle International Film Festival to organize and host the SuperFly Filmmaking Experience. It also collaborates with the Northwest Film Forum and National Geographic All Roads Film Project to present a monthly film series showcasing emerging talents in indigenous communities. Longhouse Media also supports and participates in the annual Urban Native art exhibit "First Expressions" to challenge common stereotypes and misconceptions through up and coming Pacific Northwest Native and indigenous artists. In 2009 Longhouse Media received the National Association for Media Literacy Education Award. As a young non profit organization, Longhouse Media tries to balance the internal and external challenges it faces. Areas of improvement as identified by a Graduate Consultant Team from Seattle University would be the Board's fundraising strategy, its performance monitoring, and the management of critical events.

== Social justice work ==
In March 2010, a Longhouse Media March Point documentary photo was used in an online extraction ad for Native youth in Ontario, Canada. The service offered to "round up and remove First Nations youth like wild animals, and habitat." Among many to respond, author and poet Sherman Alexie also spoke out, saying, "As much as the world has changed for indigenous people in good ways, there are still many violent and hateful folks out there who seek to harm us, and we must condemn them in print and in action, and we must do this together."
