= Bornfree Technologies Network =

Private television broadcaster from West Nile, Uganda

BTN Television, an acronym for Bornfree Technologies Network, is a television broadcaster on Arua Hill where they moved in 2015, after starting from Anyafio, a suburb of Arua. It is registered by Uganda Communications Commission to broadcast on UHF 23 in West Nile and UHF 61 in Kampala. It was the first television station from Arua and West Nile. It started broadcasts from the northern end of the outer crescent road off Oda Road.

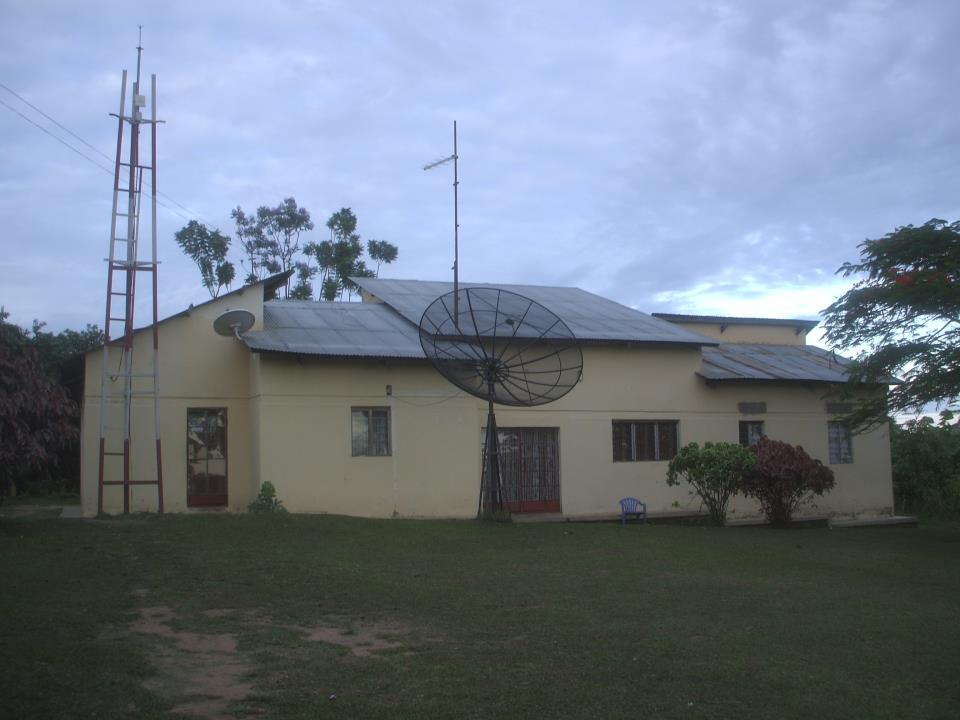
BTN TV and Nile FM studios in Anyafio Village, Arua Hill Division during the 2000s

== History ==
BTN started test broadcasts in 2003, but celebrated 10 years of existence in 2014 alongside its sister radio station - 94.1 Nile FM that was launched in 2004. It is famous for premiering music videos by West Nile artistes who do not get enough airplay on other Ugandan TV stations. English and Lugbara are the most common languages heard on the station.

== Programming ==
BTN TV is a house of music, movies, cartoons, documentaries, local shows and international news courtesy of mainly BBC Television. BTN focusses on TV programs that promote culture, democracy, peace, tolerance, reconciliation, health, agriculture and entrepreneurship. In 2014, locally produced shows included the news bulletins, Early Riser by Mara (Nsangi) - the Sweet Girl, BTN Sports with Aloro (Saidi) plus TOK, Lunch Beat Request by (Amina) Likia (around lunchtime) and Sunset Chat with Rashid and Lillian.
