= Starbucks Reserve Roastery (Seattle) =

Starbucks location in the U.S. state of Washington

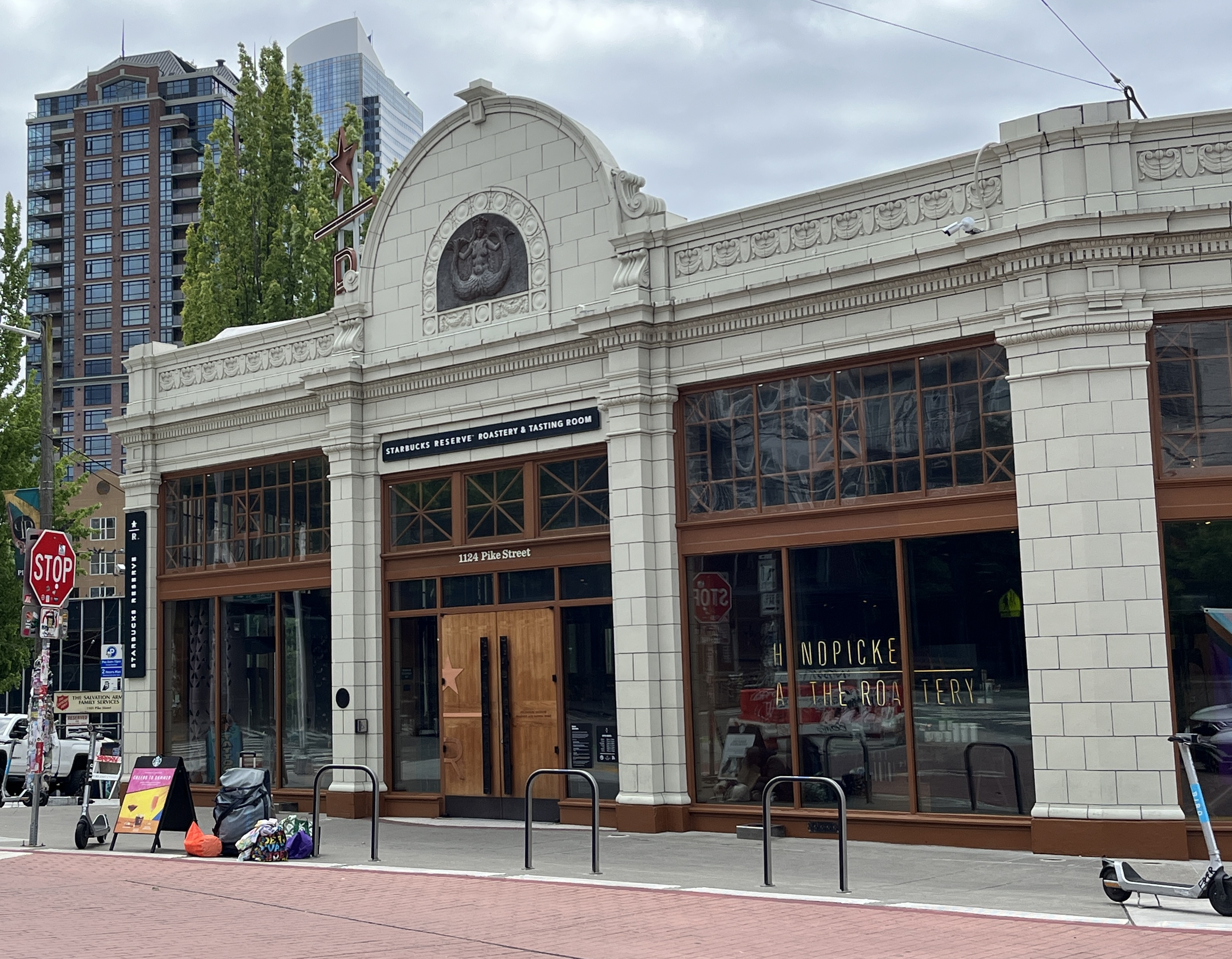
- The roastery's exterior in 2024
- Interactive map of Starbucks Reserve Roastery

Restaurant information
- Closed: September 25, 2025
- Location: 1124 Pike Street, Seattle, Washington, 98101, United States
- Coordinates: 47°36′50.5″N 122°19′41.5″W

The Starbucks Reserve Roastery (or simply the Seattle Roastery) was a Starbucks location in Seattle, in the U.S. state of Washington. Located in the Capitol Hill neighborhood, the operation was part of the company's Starbucks Reserve program. The location was described as Starbucks' "flagship Reserve Roastery", and workers at the site unionized. It featured experimental brewing setups, unique architectural features in this Starbucks, and served as a test and training site for the Reserve beverages. It opened in 2014 and closed permanently in 2025.

== Description ==
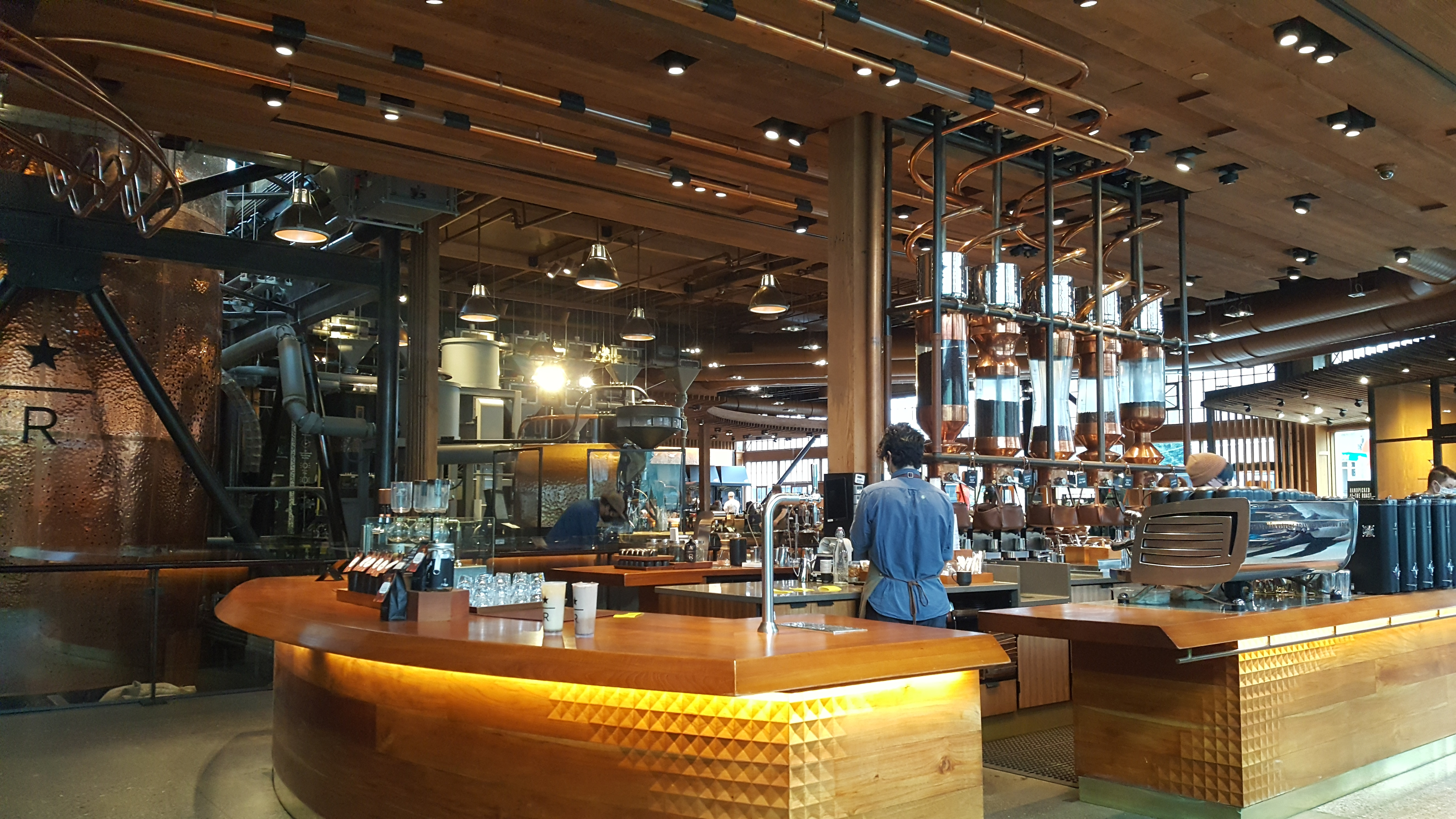
The location's interior, 2022

Thrillist called the roastery an "absolute playground for coffee lovers", offering "an immersive experience in how Starbucks sources, roasts, and crafts their beverages". According to the website, the location had a "library with more than 200 titles on coffee, fresh-baked Italian fare, local Fran's Chocolates and coffee pairings, as well as coffee-inspired cocktails".

The building's design placed a strong emphasis on production openness, allowing the public to see as beans were transported via overhead copper pipes and see massive roasting machinery. The event space was designed to serve as both a manufacturing facility and a tourist destination.

== History ==
The roastery occupied a building originally constructed during the 1920s, in an area historically referred to as "Auto Row" because of the many car dealerships which operated nearby. The site was purchased by Starbucks in 2012, which initiated an extensive renovation to convert the former auto showroom into a working coffee roastery and retail space. Starbucks opened the roastery in December 2014. This building was formerly a showroom for the Packard Motor Car Company, one of numerous luxury automobile dealers in the area at the time. It retains much of its original terra-cotta façade and huge display windows, which were typical of early twentieth-century commercial architecture.

Workers at the site filed for a union election in February 2022. The Seattle-based corporation offered employees transfers to nearby stores when feasible, citing a shift in business priorities and a more comprehensive restructure of its Reserve operations as the cause for the shutdown.

The roastery closed permanently in 2025. The Roastery closure came on the heels of labor activity, including a 2023 strike by local unionized workers; Starbucks officials claimed the closure was not associated with unionization or localized controversy. Reactions in the area were mixed: Some long-time visitors and labor advocates were disappointed the store was closing, while others said it was simply a result of Starbucks business direction. Nearby business owners shared a spectrum of opinions, with some expecting reduced foot traffic because of the closing, and others saying that, for years, the location operated more like a tourist spot than a café for the neighborhood.

== Visitor experience ==
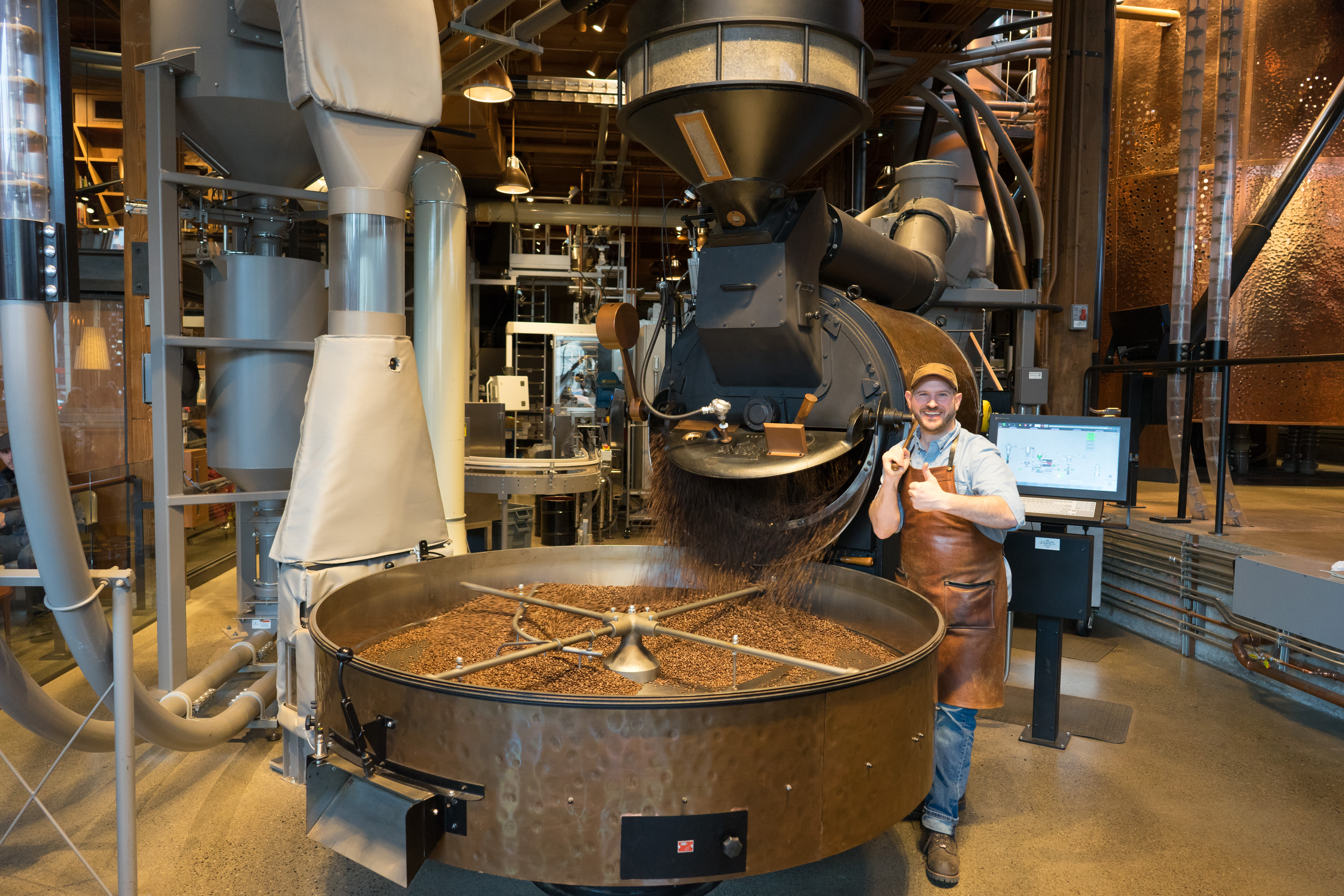
A barista roasts coffee beans at the Seattle Starbucks Reserve Roastery, where guests can see the roasting process.

The Roastery was created as a hybrid between a public tasting area and a functional coffee producing facility. The Roastery was served as a test site for the company's premium retail strategy. Due to its focus on coffee education and product differentiation, this 15,000-square-foot space had several bars and tasting stations rather than a single point of sale.

Architect Tom Kundig's design for Olson Kundig Architects emphasized transparency in craft, with copper pipes connecting roasters and brewing stations and open floor plans allowing customers to see every step of production. Reviewers described the arrangement as blending industrial and artisanal aspects, such as factory-scale machinery and handcrafted furnishings made from salvaged wood.

The Roastery also had the Scooping Bar, where clients could purchase small-lot beans by weight. In 2023, Starbucks Reserve opened an in-house Serious Pie bakery in collaboration with local chef Tom Douglas, enhancing the coffee and gastronomic experience. Over time, the Roastery became a feature of visitors to Seattle's Capitol Hill neighborhood and went on to inspire designs at future Starbucks Reserve locations worldwide.

Starbucks partnered with Ideum, an interactive experience design company, to create an interactive prototype that could illustrate the story of traceability for select Starbucks reserve coffees from the source to your cup. Visitors gained a greater appreciation for the source of the brew and the work done to create their cup of coffee while exploring maps, imagery, video, and coffee details triggered on the screen. The interactive table designed by Ideum used their custom software, Tangible Engine, to allow for augmented coffee tastings and brief educational sessions.

== Menu and product ==
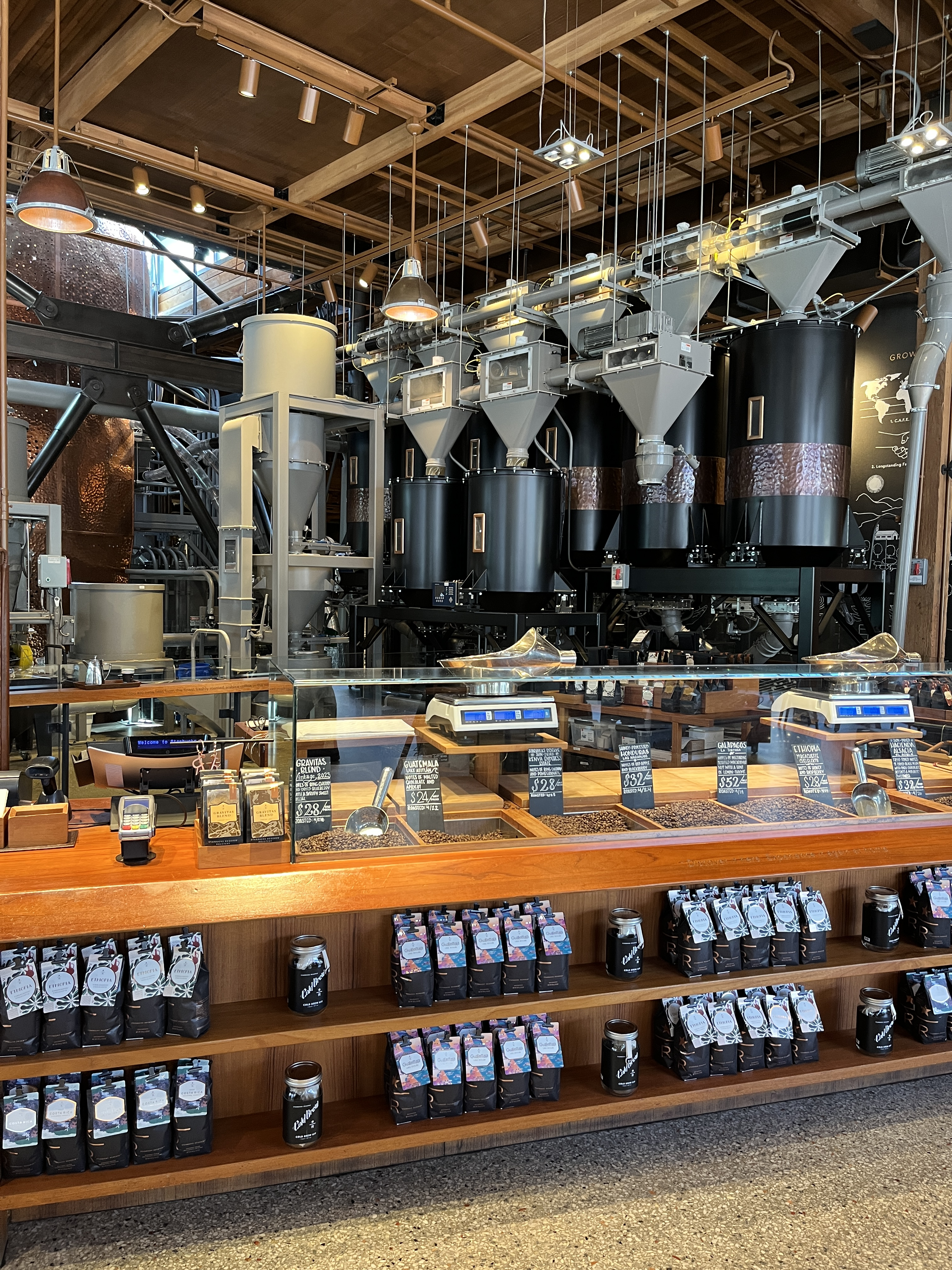
Interior, 2023

From its opening, the Seattle Roastery served as a testing ground for Starbucks’ premium and experimental product ideas, including various brew methods and extended beverage programs not offered in regular stores. The Roastery launched and then refined drinks only available at the Reserve, coffee cocktails in a dedicated Mixology Bar, and food developed in conjunction with in-house bakery partners.

The Roastery was part of the pilot and rollout for Nitro Cold Brew, and industry coverage in 2016–2017 specifically noted the rapid expansion of Nitro following its launch at the Seattle Reserve location, where it became one of the location’s best-selling drinks. The Coffee Experience Bar also tested mocktail-style cold-brew drinks (Emerald City Mule, and Cascara Lemon Sour), further supporting the idea of the Roastery’s product development before making it available in Starbucks’ broader footprint.

Food programs were part of the menu strategy. In the opening week, local chef Tom Douglas’ Serious Pie operated a 10-seat opening inside the roastery, committed to offering pizza and baked goods along with Reserve beverages. In the future, Starbucks extended its premium bakery product line at the Roastery by integrating Princi. Princi utilized the Roastery location to bake food throughout the day in relation to the additional premium experience.
