= Gary Rhodes =

English chef and restaurateur (1960–2019)

Gary Rhodes OBE
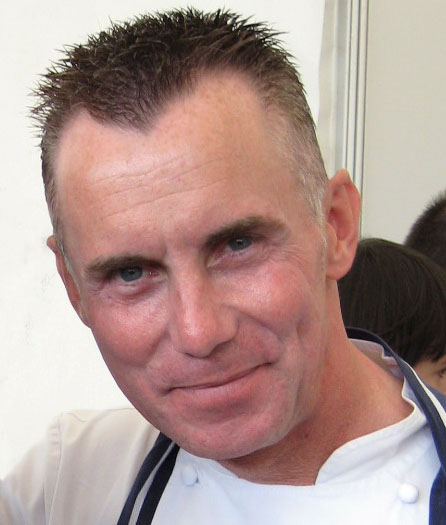
- Rhodes in 2008
- Born: 22 April 1960; London, England
- Died: 26 November 2019 (aged 59); Dubai, United Arab Emirates
- Spouse: Jennie Rhodes (m. 1989)
- Children: 2
- Culinary career
- Cooking style: British cuisine
- Previous restaurants
- Rhodes W1, Dubai; Rhodes Twenty10, Dubai; Rhodes Calabash, Grenada
- Television shows
- Gary Rhodes Autumn into Winter; Gary Rhodes Spring into Summer; Hell's Kitchen; Masterchef USA; MasterChef UK; New British Classics Nov/Dec; Gary's Perfect Christmas; Roald Dahl's Revolting Recipes; Open Rhodes Around Britain; More Rhodes Around Britain; Rhodes Around Britain; Hot Chefs; Rhodes Across India; Rhodes Across China; Rhodes Across the Caribbean
- Website: www.garyrhodes.co.uk

Gary Rhodes (22 April 1960 – 26 November 2019) was an English restaurateur and television chef, known for his love of English cuisine and ingredients and for his distinctive spiked hair style. He fronted shows such as MasterChef, MasterChef USA, Hell's Kitchen, and his own series, Rhodes Around Britain. As well as owning several restaurants, Rhodes had his own line of cookware and bread mixes. Rhodes went on to feature in the ITV1 programme Saturday Cooks, as well as the UKTV Food show Local Food Hero before his sudden death at age 59.

== Early years ==
Rhodes was born in Camberwell, south London, in 1960, to Gordon and Jean (née Ferris) Rhodes. He moved with his family to Gillingham, Kent, where he went to The Howard School in Rainham. He then attended catering college in Thanet where he met his wife Jennie.

== Career ==
Rhodes' first job was at the Amsterdam Hilton Hotel. He was hit by a Ford Transit van in Amsterdam, leaving him with serious injuries. He then toured Europe in various jobs before becoming sous chef at the Reform Club in Pall Mall, and then on to the Michelin-starred Capital Hotel in Knightsbridge, where he worked under Brian Turner. Rhodes became the head chef at the Castle Hotel, Taunton, in Somerset. He retained the hotel's Michelin star at the age of 26. As part of his programme Floyd on Britain & Ireland, Keith Floyd watched Gary make roast oxtail.

In 1990, Rhodes returned to London with his family to become head chef at The Greenhouse restaurant in Mayfair. The menu became known for reviving British classics, including faggots, fishcakes, braised oxtails and bread and butter pudding. He was awarded a Michelin star for The Greenhouse in January 1996. In 1997 he opened his first restaurant, City Rhodes, and in 1998 Rhodes in the Square, both in London with global contract catering company Sodexo. This partnership expanded into the brasseries Rhodes & Co in Manchester, Edinburgh and Crawley.

In 2003, following the closure of the restaurants City Rhodes and Rhodes in the Square, he opened Rhodes Twenty Four in one of London's tallest buildings, Tower 42. Rhodes described his hopes for the restaurant on its launch: "If we never get a Michelin star here, I will be very disappointed, but what I really want is customers." It won a Michelin star in 2005, which it retained as one of Rhodes' two Michelin-starred restaurants in London until its closure in 2014.

Rhodes also owned Arcadian Rhodes on the P&O superliner MS Arcadia, Rhodes W1 at The Cumberland Hotel in London, and Rhodes Calabash at The Calabash Hotel in Grenada. He was also a contributor to the BBC Good Food magazine.

His first TV appearance was at the age of 27, courtesy of TV chef Glynn Christian on Hot Chefs. This led to the BBC series Rhodes Around Britain in 1994 and Gary's Rhodes' Perfect Christmas in 1998. In 1999, Rhodes presented a BBC TV series Gary Rhodes' New British Classics, reintroducing classic British cuisine, and published a book of the same name. For two seasons, in 2000 and 2001, Rhodes hosted the original MasterChef USA on PBS.

Rhodes starred in the television series Rhodes Across India, with apprentices Bushra Akram, Scott Davis and Kalwant Sahota, and, in 2008, Rhodes Across China, which explored Chinese cuisine, with sous chefs Melissa Syers and Teresa Tsang.

Rhodes appeared in a commercial tie-in with Tate & Lyle in the late 1990s, and his recipes endorsed sugar and treacle products accordingly; his name was printed on every Tate & Lyle sugar sachet across the country. Rhodes was associated with a Cooking in Schools campaign with Flora UK and appeared in television adverts for Flora margarine, some of which featured him "driving a van topped with a giant styrofoam crumpet" which were banned.

He was appointed Officer of the Order of the British Empire (OBE) on 17 June 2006. In the same year he competed, representing the South of England, in the BBC's Great British Menu, but lost to Atul Kochhar.

Rhodes appeared on the BBC Two spoof game show Shooting Stars, during which hosts Vic Reeves and Bob Mortimer asked him to "represent fire through the medium of dance". He also competed, with professional partner Karen Hardy, in the sixth series of Strictly Come Dancing which began on 20 September 2008, and finished in 14th place.

In 2011, Rhodes moved to Dubai, United Arab Emirates. He headed Rhodes Mezzanine, later Rhodes W1 Dubai, at the Grosvenor House Hotel, and another restaurant Rhodes Twenty10 at Le Royal Méridien Beach Resort & Spa. In 2013 he opened his first restaurant in Abu Dhabi, Rhodes 44 at The St. Regis Hotel. Rhodes was a supporter of Manchester United.

== Death ==
Rhodes died in Dubai, United Arab Emirates, on 26 November 2019; he was aged 59. Rock Oyster Media and Goldfinch TV said in a statement to the PA news agency that Rhodes had become unwell, while filming, and died shortly thereafter. It was later confirmed by Rhodes' family that his death was a result of a subdural haematoma, normally associated with a head injury.

== Restaurants ==
- Rhodes W1 (formerly Rhodes Mezzanine) – Grosvenor House Hotel, Dubai
- Rhodes Calabash – The Calabash Hotel, Grenada
- Rhodes Twenty10 – Le Royal Méridien Beach Resort & Spa, Dubai
- Rhodes Twenty Four ( Michelin star) – Tower 42, London (closed in 2014)
- Rhodes 44 – The St. Regis Hotel, Abu Dhabi (closed in 2014)
- Rhodes W1 ( Michelin star) – The Cumberland Hotel, London (closed in 2012)
- Rhodes W1 Brasserie – The Cumberland Hotel, London (closed in 2012)
- Arcadian Rhodes – aboard the P&O liner MS Arcadia (replaced in 2011)
- Oriana Rhodes – aboard the P&O liner MS Oriana (replaced in 2011)
- Rhodes South – Christchurch Harbour Hotel, Christchurch (closed in 2010)
- Kings Rhodes – Kings Arms Hotel, Christchurch (closed in 2009)
- Rhodes D7 – Dublin (closed in 2009)
- Rhodes in the Square ( Michelin star) – London (closed in 2003)
- City Rhodes ( Michelin star) – London (closed in 2003)
- Rhodes & Co – Golden Tulip Hotel, Manchester (closed in 2003)
- Rhodes & Co – Jenners Department Store, Edinburgh (closed in 2002)
- Rhodes & Co – Arora Hotel Gatwick, Crawley (closed in 2002 or 2003)
- Rhodes @ the Dome – Plymouth Hoe, Plymouth (involvement ended in 2016)
