= Tom Douglas (chef) =

Restaurateur, chef, author, talk show host

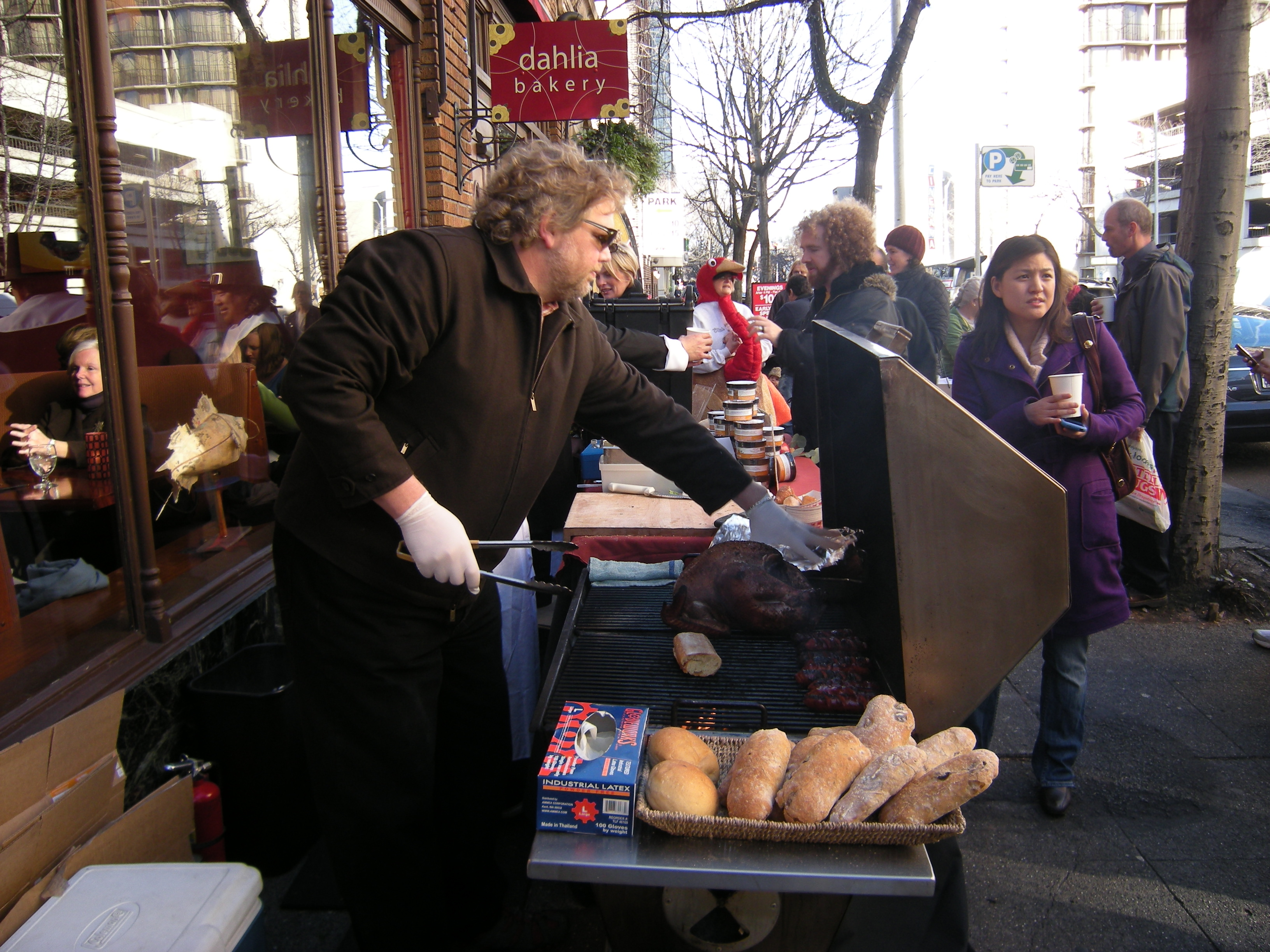
- Douglas at the grill in front of the Dahlia Lounge during a pre-Thanksgiving food giveaway in 2008
- Born: August 2, 1958 (age 67); Wilmington, Delaware, U.S.
- Spouse: Jackie Cross
- Culinary career
- Cooking style: Pacific Rim, Italian, Greek
- Website: tomdouglas.com

Tom Douglas (born August 2, 1958) is an American executive chef, restaurateur, author, and radio talk show host, and winner of the 1994 James Beard Award for Best Northwest Chef. In 2012 he also won the James Beard Award as Best Restaurateur. He is the author of Tom Douglas' Seattle Kitchen, which was named the Best American Cookbook by the James Beard Foundation and KitchenAid, in 2001. In 2005, he appeared on an episode of the Food Network's Iron Chef America, in which he defeated Chef Masaharu Morimoto.

== Early life, family ==
Tom Douglas was born on August 2, 1958, in Wilmington, Delaware. After relocating to Seattle, he started working in a variety of jobs from general construction to serving as a railroad car mechanic. As of 2006, Douglas lives in the Ballard neighborhood in Seattle, Washington, with his wife and business partner, Jackie Cross, and their daughter. Their farm in Prosser provides a variety of produce for use in his restaurants.

== Restaurant career ==
Douglas's first restaurant job was working at the Hotel duPont, where he served as an assistant to the hotel's cook. In 1984, following working in a series of general labor jobs, Douglas began working at a Seattle restaurant, Café Sport. In November 1989, he opened his first restaurant, the Dahlia Lounge. In 1994, he was recognized as the Best Chef in the Northwest by the James Beard Foundation, in a tie with fellow Seattle chef Monique Barbeau.

In February 1995, Douglas and his wife opened Etta's Seafood. The following year, they opened the Palace Kitchen. In 2001, he opened the Dahlia Bakery, to complement the food of Dahlia Lounge.

In July 2004, Douglas opened Lola. In 2006, he opened a pizzeria, known as Serious Pie. The original location, Serious Pie Virginia, is in downtown Seattle, and the second location, Serious Pie and Biscuit, was located in the South Lake Union neighborhood until its closure due to the COVID-19 pandemic.

Douglas was one of the first restaurateurs in Seattle to close due to COVID-19. Work-at-home orders from companies near his restaurants had reduced his sales by up to 90%, and on March 11, he announced that 12 of his 13 restaurants would close until further notice, effective the following Sunday (March 15). Dahlia Bakery remained open to service a contract with a hotel across the street. The move proved prescient, as the Washington governor issued a statewide closure on March 16. Later he revealed that it had cost his restaurant group nearly $3 million to settle payroll, benefits, and other debts for the shutdown, and that it would be "tough" for half of the restaurants to return. Soon after, though, he was able to open a no-contact carry-out pop-up restaurant in the Ballard neighborhood, called "Serious TakeOut".

The extended shutdown led to many closures among Douglas's restaurants. In July 2020, he announced that two closures, of the Brave Horse Tavern and Trattoria Cuoco, would become permanent, as both restaurants were reaching the end of their ten-year leases and the future remained uncertain. Douglas similarly declined to renew the lease for Serious Pie and Biscuit in September, and announcements of Dahlia Lounge's closure followed in March 2021. Dahlia Bakery was reopened in July 2021.

== Radio talk show ==
Douglas co-hosts a weekly food radio show with longtime friend Thierry Rautureau. The show, Seattle Kitchen, regularly focuses on local and national cookbook authors and personalities. The show is broadcast weekly on Saturdays and Sundays on KIRO-FM, 97.3. It is recorded on Tuesday mornings in front of a live audience at the "Hot Stove Society", Tom Douglas's cooking school in Seattle.

== Published works ==
- Douglas, Tom (2000). Tom Douglas' Seattle Kitchen, William Morrow Cookbooks, 288 pages. ISBN 978-0688172428
- Douglas, Tom (2003). Tom's Big Dinners: Big-Time Home Cooking for Family and Friends, William Morrow Cookbooks, 288 pages. ISBN 978-0060515027
- Douglas, Tom; and Shelley Lance (2006). I Love Crab Cakes! 50 Recipes for an American Classic, William Morrow Cookbooks, 160 pages. ISBN 978-0060881962
- Douglas, Tom; and Shelley Lance (2012). The Dahlia Bakery Cookbook, Sweetness in Seattle, William Morrow Cookbooks, 390 pages. ISBN 978-0062183743

== Honors and awards ==
- 1991: James Beard Award for Outstanding Restaurant – Dahlia Lounge (nominee)
- 1992: James Beard Award for Outstanding Restaurant – Dahlia Lounge (nominee)
- 1993: James Beard Award for Outstanding Restaurant – Dahlia Lounge (nominee)
- 1994: James Beard Award for Best Chef: Northwest (winner)
- 1996: James Beard Award for Outstanding New Restaurant – Palace Kitchen (nominee)
- 2001: James Beard Award/KitchenAid Book Award for Tom Douglas' Seattle Kitchen
- 2005: Named Food Network's Iron Chef (defeating Masaharu Morimoto)
- 2006: James Beard Award for Outstanding Restaurant – Dahlia Lounge (nominee)
- 2008: Bon Appétit Magazine Award for Restaurateur of the Year
- 2008: James Beard Award for Outstanding Restaurateur (nominee)
- 2009: James Beard Award for Outstanding Restaurateur (nominee)
- 2010: James Beard Award for Outstanding Restaurateur (nominee)
- 2011: James Beard Award for Outstanding Restaurateur (nominee)
- 2012: James Beard Award for Outstanding Restaurateur (winner)
