= Sine Qua Non (wine) =

California winery

Sine Qua Non (commonly abbreviated as SQN) is a California winery that is known for its limited-production and expensive wines made from blends of Rhône grape varieties. Each release is allocated and directly sold to a mailing list of customers. As of 2018, the wait to join the mailing list was about 9 years. The winery is located in Ventura County and was founded in 1993 by Austrian Manfred Krankl, who emigrated to the US in 1980.

The name of the winery, Sine Qua Non, is a Latin phrase translated as "absolutely indispensable". The wines themselves are given frequently changing names such as Queen of Spades, Twisted & Bent, Imposter McCoy, The Bride, Poker Face, and Red Handed. The bottles are unusually shaped with distinctive labels featuring Manfred Krankl's own artwork.

== History ==
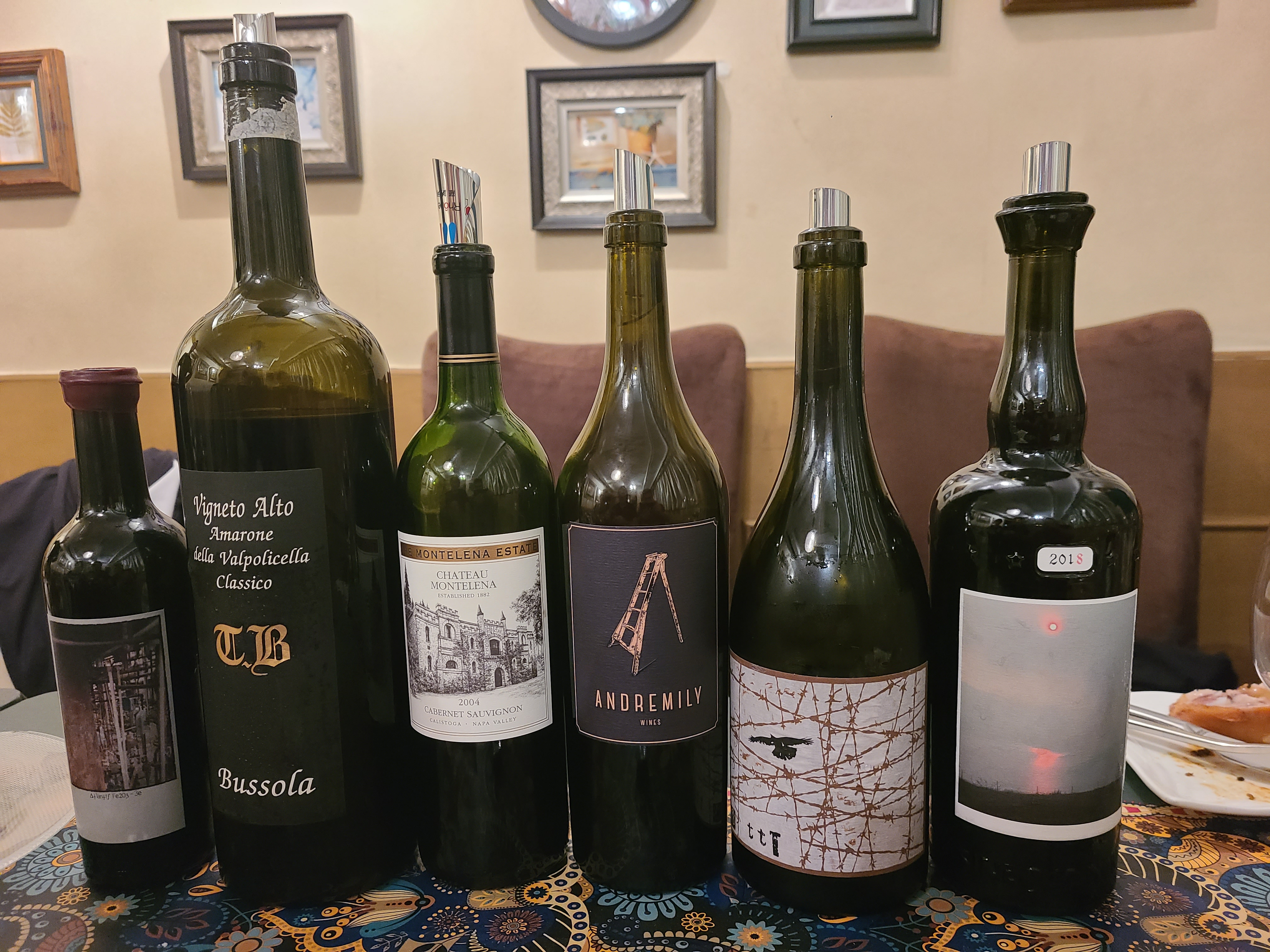
L1: 2005 Roussanne Atlantis Fe2O3~3e, R1: Elevn Confessions Syrah 2018, R2: 2018 The Third Twin Graciano

Founded in 1994 by Manfred Krankl and his wife Elaine, the Krankls began making their own wines in 1994 due to personal interest and with the added benefit of being able, if the wines were good enough, to sell them to the successful Mediterranean-themed Los Angeles restaurant Campanile, which Manfred co-founded and managed. Beginning with several self-described "project wines" made in partnership with John Alban and other vintners, initial production was approximately 100 cases and was done at Alban Vineyards. After several experiments with white varieties, Rhone red varieties and even Pinot noir, the Krankls found their sweet spot in 1994 with a predominantly Syrah-based blend they named Queen of Spades that earned a 95-point rating from Robert Parker. Today, this wine retails at an average price of $5,861 per bottle.

Manfred was also a co-founder of La Brea Bakery. Sale of a portion of his ownership position in LaBrea enabled him to focus on wine-making full-time, at which point total production, diversity of releases, and competency with the full spectrum of Rhone (and other) varieties steadily increased.

Sourcing fruit from a wide variety of growers from year to year, and increasingly from their own vineyards has caused the winery to never make exactly the same wine twice, about which Krankl has said, "People buy Sine Qua Non. They don’t seem to give a toot where it’s from". However, beginning with 2020, 100% of the grapes will come from SQN-owned vineyards.

A tradition at Sine Qua Non has been that each wine has a distinct name, label and bottle style. Each label is designed by Manfred, often with linocut art work of his own creation. However, in 2021, SQN announced that due to the difficulty of registering new names, which has sometimes required renaming a wine before release, there will no longer be unique names for each bottling.

Sine Qua Non's Syrahs were among the first American Syrahs to create significant interest and trading volume in the global wine auction market. From the second quarter of 1999 to early 2008, the value of SQN wines at auctions appreciated by 163% in contrast to the 128% appreciation rate during the same period of other collectible wines listed on the Wine Spectator Auction Index. In 2015, three half bottles of the 2002 Sine Qua Non E° (a rosé, which is not typically a wine type that attracts high prices at auction), sold for a total of $4,200.

Sine Qua Non's first winery, located in an undistinguished warehouse at the back of an industrial facility in North Ventura, has been described by Robert Parker as "a facility that looks like a Mad Max movie set". Over the years, the Krankls have steadily purchased or leased their own terroir with the goal of obtaining total control over the growth and supply of their grapes. They currently manage several vineyards, including an approximately 10-planted-acre plot at their home facility in Oakview, California, just inland from Ventura, California, and another approximately 20-planted-acre plot in the Santa Rita Hills region near Buellton, California. In 2012, a major new winery facility was completed on the Krankl's Oak View, California, lands, and most vinification was relocated there from the initial Ventura winery location.

In collaboration with Austrian winemaker Alois Kracher, Manfred and Elaine Krankl have also produced sweet wines under the label "Mr. K" (after the surnames of the two winemakers). Krankl announced that this program would end with the release of the 2006 vintage due to the untimely death of Kracher.

The red wines have typically included the grape varieties of Syrah, Grenache and Mourvedre. The white wines are typically made from Roussanne, Viognier and Marsanne. Sine Qua Non also produced a Pinot noir for several years, but discontinued that program after the 2005 vintage. In certain vintages, the winery has also released a rosé made predominantly from the Grenache variety.

In the late 2000s, Sine Qua Non began releasing Syrah and Grenache blends with extended barrel aging (EBA). These wines are held in barrel or cask for at least two and sometimes up to six years prior to bottling and release.

The annual production of Sine Qua Non averages 3,500 cases (310 hL), or approximately 140 standard sixty-gallon barrels. It is a quantity the Krankls call the maximum possible given their non-scalable, personal, hands-on tending of the entire winemaking process. This production includes literally each vine and cluster of grapes in all vineyards from which they derive fruit.

In 2007, Manfred and Elaine Krankl started a sister winery named Next of Kyn. These wines are sourced from their Cumulus Vineyard which is planted around their estate in Oakview. Beginning with the 2014 vintage, they also started releasing wines coming from their estate vineyard called The Third Twin, located in Los Alamos. The latter includes a wine made from the Spanish grape Graciano, which is the lowest production bottling they produce (855 bottles in 2017). Next of Kyn and The Third Twin offer wines via separate mailing lists than that of Sine Qua Non.

Beginning in 2010, Manfred Krankl also started collaborating with Clos Saint-Jean’s Maurel brothers, Vincent and Pascal, and oenologist Philippe Cambie to produce a wine named Chimère in France's Chateauneuf du Pape region. The Mourvedre that predominates in this blend comes from the famous la Crau lieu-dit.

== See also ==
- Rhone Rangers
