= Michael McCarty (restaurateur) =

Michael McCarty is a restaurateur who owns Michael's (restaurant) with locations in Manhattan and Santa Monica, California. Michael’s has been the “springboard” for chefs like Jonathan Waxman, Roy Yamaguchi, Mark Peel, Brooke Williamson and Nancy Silverton.

He is considered to be one of the first to promote seasonal California cuisine. Others have said “the father of contemporary California cuisine.”

McCarty was 25 when he opened the Santa Monica location of Michael’s. However, he had worked at places like Ma Maison and L'Ermitage Beverly Hills.
