= Doris & Ed's Seafood Restaurant =

Defunct seafood restaurant in Highlands, New Jersey, U.S.

- Exterior of the restaurant prior to demolition, with Sandy Hook Bay visible to the left
- Former location of Doris & Ed's

Restaurant information
- Established: May 1978; 48 years ago
- Closed: August 2011; 15 years ago
- Food type: Seafood
- Dress code: Business casual
- Location: 348 Shore Drive, Highlands, Monmouth County, New Jersey, 07732, United States
- Coordinates: 40.4085°N 74.0000°W
- Website: dorisandeds.com – via Internet Archive

Doris & Ed's Seafood Restaurant was a seafood restaurant in Highlands, New Jersey, United States. It was the first restaurant in New Jersey to receive any award from the James Beard Foundation when it was named one of "America's Classics" in 1998, the award's inaugural year. The restaurant closed in 2011 after sustaining heavy storm damage from Hurricane Irene.

== Description ==
The interior of the restaurant as seen after a March 2010 remodel. Camel-colored walls and linens replaced a white-on-white palette.

Doris and Ed's was located in a waterfront building at 348 Shore Drive in Highlands, New Jersey, near the Sandy Hook peninsula and one block away from a ferry terminal serving Manhattan. Sheltered by a Highlands hill, the building stood at the back of a parking lot, separated from the shore of Sandy Hook Bay by an undeveloped lot and a narrow spit of sand. Windows in the main dining room faced the parking lot with a distant view of the bay beyond; the Manhattan skyline was visible across the water during sunset and on clear nights.

The dining space accommodated about 90 seats. A full bar with several tables stood by the entrance and a windowed "porch room" offered views of the bay; corridor-like overflow seating was located adjacent to the bar. Saltwater tanks held live lobsters until they were cooked. Decor was sparse and bright; the dining room's white walls were accented in 1990 with sea-foam green linens and curtains, and by 2006 with a white palette that kept attention on the outside skyline. Tables were set in long rows parallel to the windows, close enough that servers had difficulty passing between chairs on full nights. A renovation in 2010 replaced the white color palette with camel-colored walls and new linens.

Expected attire was upscale casual. Some diners wore jackets and ties; shorts, beachwear, and sweatpants were prohibited. Waiting staff wore white shirts, black trousers, and black suspenders.

The restaurant served dinner only, closing Mondays and Tuesdays for most of the year, but opening on Tuesdays in July and August; the restaurant closed entirely for the months of January and February. Reservations were accepted every night except Saturdays in the early 1990s; by 2010, in-season tables on Saturday were being booked a week or more in advance.

== History ==
=== Origins and the Petraseks ===
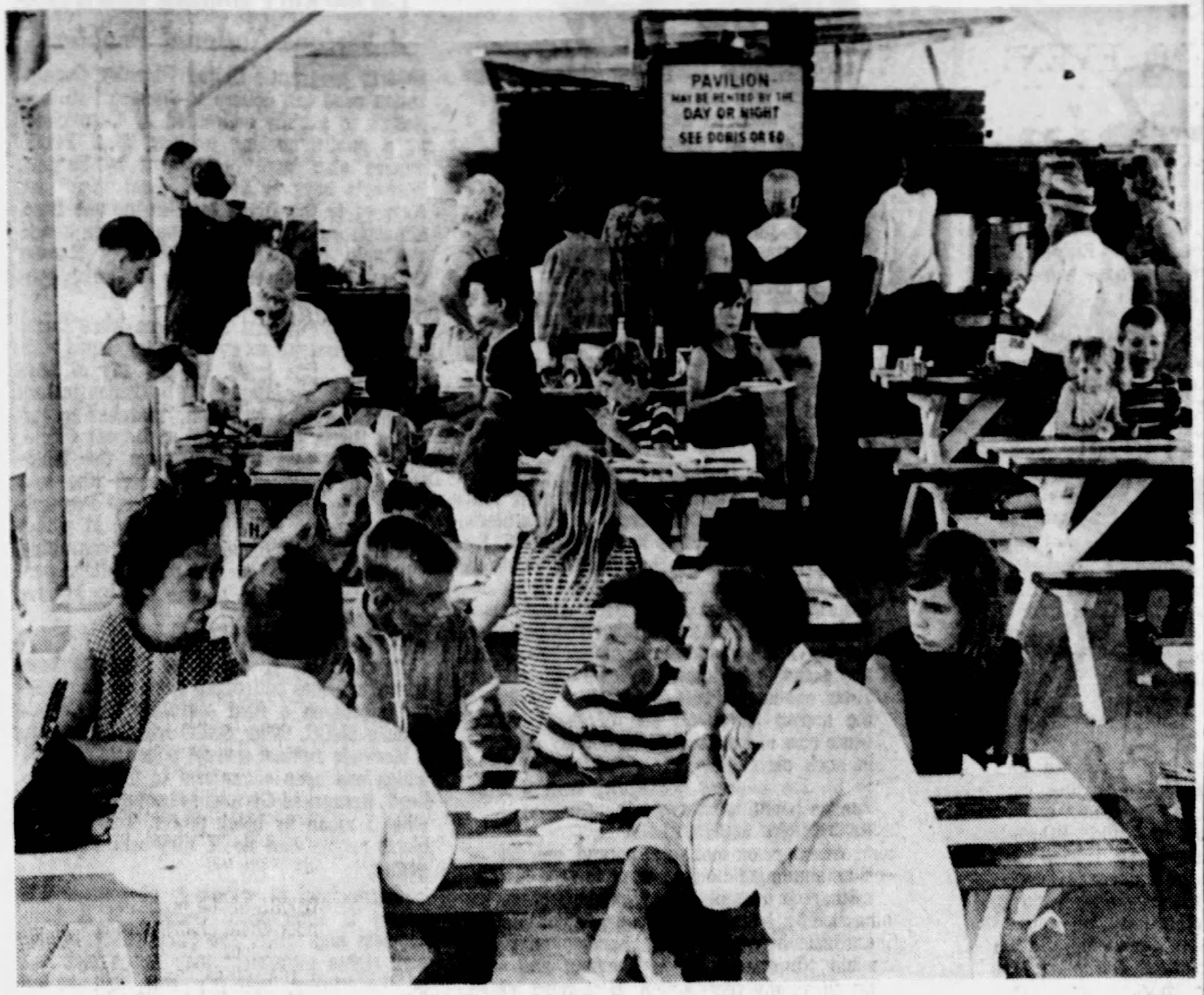
Attendees at the Highlands Community Center Clam Festival eat hot dogs, clams, and corn on the cob under the open-air pavilion at Doris and Ed's, August 1966.

Described as "one of those old, haphazardly built shore-front homes," the restaurant occupied a former nineteenth-century bay-side hotel on a property overlooking Sandy Hook Bay. It was advertised as the Allen House in a Highlands hotel and business directory in October 1911, and later opened as The Sand Bar in July 1937. The property operated as the Sand Bar Hotel and Boat Basin until March 1955, when it was purchased by Petrasek family members from Garfield, New Jersey, doing business as the Montauk Striper Manufacturing Company; the marina was then renamed the Montauk Boat Basin. William Petrasek, who owned and managed the basin, later sold it to his brother, Edward Petrasek, and Edward's wife, Doris Petrasek.

Doris and Edward Petrasek ran a picnic beach, a restaurant, and a boat basin on the property during the 1960s. Doris and Ed's Picnic Beach extended across four hundred feet of waterfront and was set with tables, umbrellas, and charcoal barbecue pits; an open-air pavilion sat about a hundred guests. Doris and Ed's Picnic Beach Bar, later renamed Doris 'N Ed's Seafood Restaurant by late 1965, offered seafood and steak in a "quiet, floral atmosphere," with a cocktail lounge separate from the dining room. Doris Petrasek prepared the restaurant's entire menu, while Edward Petrasek managed the boat basin.

By the early 1970s, the restaurant seated 90 guests, employed 22 staff, and billed itself as the "House of Gourmet Seafood" with Doris and Edward Petrasek cooking to order themselves. The dining room was furnished with plastic flowers, plastic fish, and red-and-white checkered tablecloths. Lobster was one of the restaurant's specialties; diners chose from a large stock of live lobsters kept in two tanks for their meals. The wine list was short, and was described by The New York Times as "adequate, but unimaginative." Rising seafood prices through the early 1970s pressured the business; Edward Petrasek said in 1974 that the cost of fish had almost driven him out of the trade.

Edward Petrasek died on April 2, 1978, aged 65, while still owner and operator of the restaurant. Doris Petrasek sold the business and retired shortly afterwards.

=== Ownership under the Filips ===
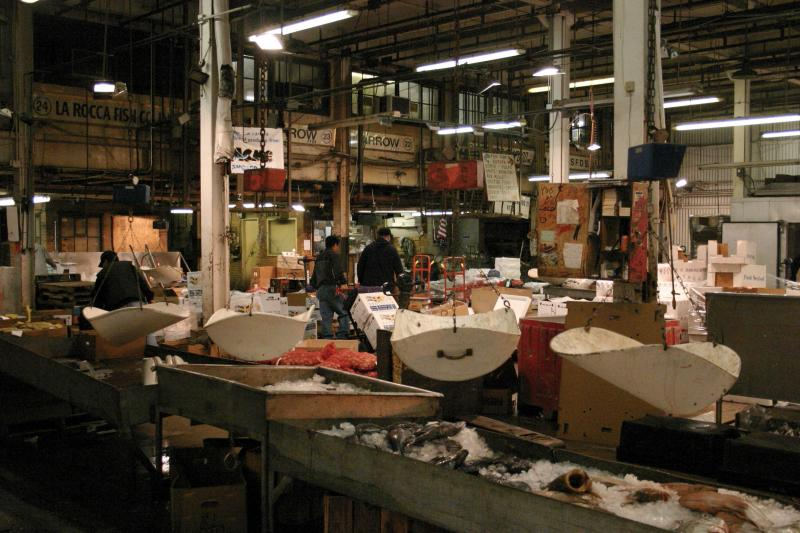
The restaurant sourced fish from the Fulton Fish Market in Manhattan, its old interior seen here.

Jim Filip graduated from Oklahoma State University with a degree in restaurant management before serving in the United States Army during the Vietnam War. He began his hospitality career at the Golden Ox in Kansas City, before spending 10 years with Chef's International, a restaurant chain. Jim and Mary Dee Filip bought the restaurant from Doris Petrasek and reopened it in May 1978, replacing its fish-house decor and checkerboard tablecloths with sea-blue curtains, carpeting, and linens. Although the name was kept for local familiarity, the redecoration drove regulars away; low turnout caused Jim Filip to consider abandoning the restaurant during its first summer.

Finding that suppliers serving northern New Jersey would not deliver to Highlands and little beyond lettuce, broccoli, and carrots south of the Raritan River, Jim Filip began driving to the Fulton Fish Market in Manhattan before dawn to buy fish; he built relationships with vendors until they would extend him credit. Initially knowing nothing about wine, he taught himself. He began recommending wine and food pairings against traditional advice, saying that "pinot noir is better with tuna and salmon than any white wine"; winning customers over, he said, was a long, drawn-out process. To bring together classic and contemporary dishes, Jim Filip divided the menu into two, titling the sections "Shore Yesterday" and "Shore Today", a format still in use at the restaurant's reopening in 2010.

Recognition had arrived slowly. The Daily Register reviewed Doris and Ed's in 1980 and The New York Times in 1982, after which Jim Filip said that customers began to understand what he was doing. Beginning in 1985, the restaurant's wine list won Wine Spectator's "Award of Excellence" every year until it closed. By the late 1980s, Russell Dare joined the restaurant as executive chef; diners waited up to an hour for one of the restaurant's thirty tables by 1989. In its own advertising during the mid-1990s, the restaurant listed a series of awards including Gourmet's 1996 "Top 10 Tables in New Jersey", as well as New Jersey Monthly's "Best Seafood Restaurant in Central Jersey" from 1985 to 1996.

=== National recognition ===
External video
- Jim Filip and Russell Dare prepare and serve Wild Alaskan King Salmon with Pinot Noir sauce.
- https://archive.org/details/RalphRiccardiDorisEds

In 1998, the James Beard Foundation named Doris and Ed's among the first recipients of its "America's Classics" award, making it the first New Jersey restaurant to receive any James Beard award. The award recognized the Mid-Atlantic region, which also included Philadelphia, Baltimore, and Washington, D.C. Andrea Clurfeld, then a restaurant critic for the Asbury Park Press and a member of the foundation's awards committee, wrote that The Washington Post critic Phyllis Richman had been skeptical that a restaurant so distant from a major city could represent the region, but visited Highlands before the ceremony and concluded that it "looks exactly right".

Jim Filip initially mistook the announcement for an April Fool's joke; on a colleague's warning, Jim Filip spent $5,000 (equivalent to $9,880 in 2025) on a new telephone system in anticipation of the response. Clurfeld wrote that the reaction to the award was "thunderous", bringing both longtime supporters and new diners to the restaurant. Jim Filip refurbished the building following the award, telling The New York Times in 2002 that the recognition had validated his view that "while Doris and Ed's is on the New Jersey shore, it is not a shore restaurant". By 2003, Russell Dare and his sous-chef, Mike Waters, were changing the sauces and specials on the "Shore Today" menu every Wednesday, drawing inspiration from the existing menu, the kitchen's available ingredients, and faxes from the restaurant's suppliers.

The restaurant was covered in Gourmet, Bon Appétit, and The New York Times, and appeared on the Food Network series FoodNation with Bobby Flay. Jim Filip served as trustee of the New Jersey Restaurant Association, which named him its "Restaurateur of the Year" in 2004. He later advised the Culinary Education Center of Monmouth County and served on the board of trustees of the Food Bank of Monmouth and Ocean Counties, which honored him with its "Humanitarian of the Year" award.

=== Final years and closure ===
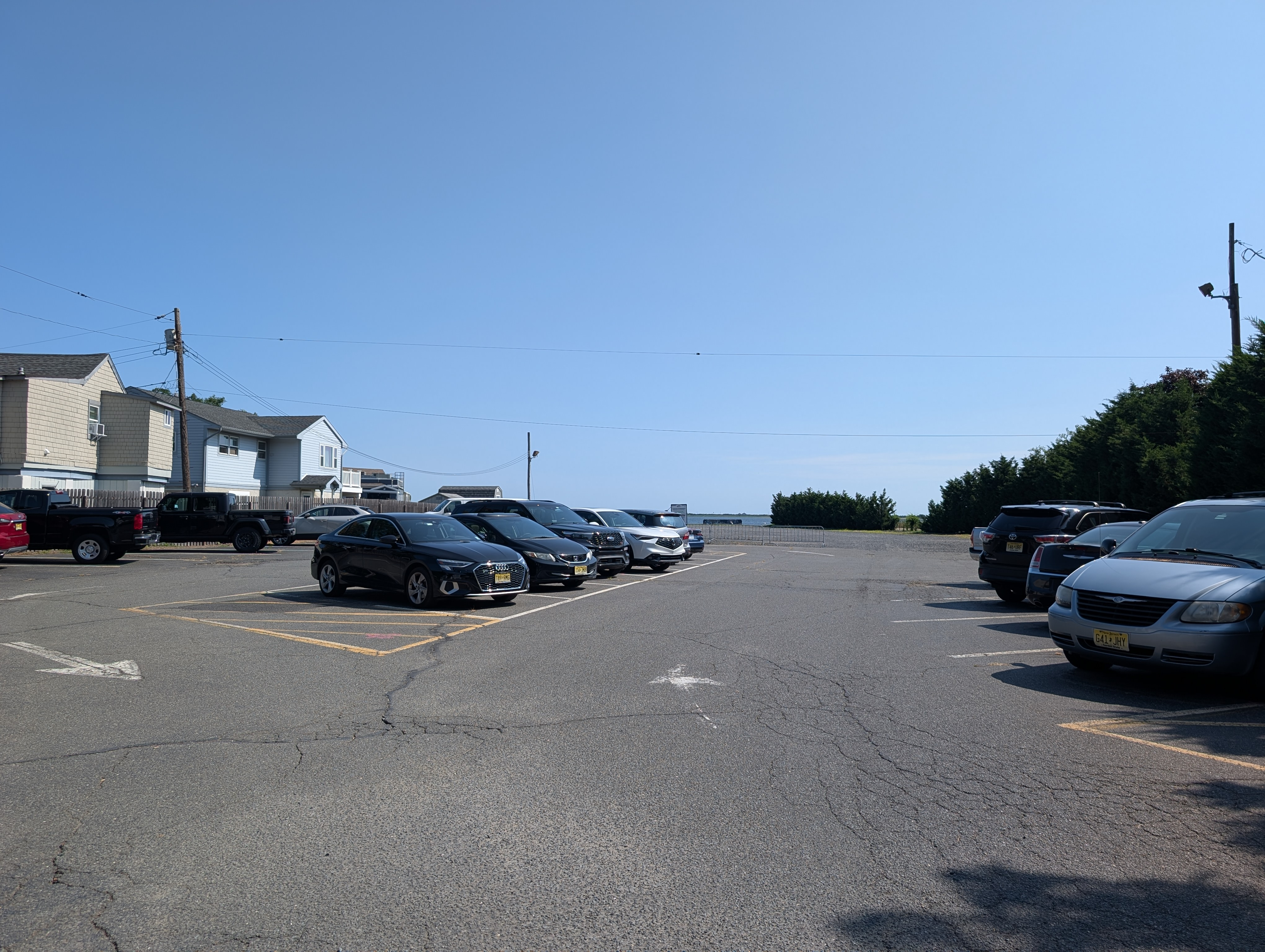
As of 2026, the property is used as a parking lot for Seastreak, a passenger ferry service.

In 2009, judging that the restaurant had developed a reputation for being expensive, Jim Filip spent the off-season creating a three-course prix fixe menu priced at $33, pairing it with a selection of five wines at each of $25, $35, and $45. Jim Filip said that customers had to be given options during the economic climate at the time. The restaurant closed for renovation over the following winter and reopened in May 2010; the restaurant featured newly painted camel-colored walls and a new chef, Thomas Donohoe, who had trained under Thomas Keller at The French Laundry and Jonathan Waxman at Barbuto.

Hurricane Irene struck New Jersey in late August 2011, causing heavy damage to the building; the restaurant closed and did not reopen for the remainder of the season. In October 2011, Jim Filip said that he was still waiting on his insurers, could not begin repairs, and would decide the restaurant's future after the winter. The restaurant was still attempting to reopen when Hurricane Sandy struck New Jersey in October 2012. Hurricane Sandy caused extensive damage across Highlands, destroying several of the borough's restaurants and bars and leaving others beyond repair; New Jersey Monthly reported in May 2013 that the storm appeared to have ended Doris and Ed's prospects of reopening.

The property, still owned by Jim Filip, was vacant as of September 2015. Seastreak, which operates a ferry terminal a block away, acquired the property; by July 2016, the company was offering the site for overnight and overflow parking. A Seastreak representative said in 2017 that the former restaurant site, together with the company's existing lot, gave it sufficient parking to meet demand. Jim Filip died on March 7, 2017, aged 75.

== See also ==
- Bahrs Landing – a Highlands seafood restaurant, established 1919
- Corinne's Place – latest New Jersey "America's Classics"-winning restaurant
- List of defunct restaurants of the United States
- List of restaurants in New Jersey
- List of seafood restaurants
