= Top Chef Masters season 1 =

Top Chef Masters
- Season 1
- No. of tasks: 19
- No. of contestants: 24
- Winner: Rick Bayless
- No. of episodes: 10

Release
- Original network: Bravo
- Original release: June 10 – August 19, 2009

Season chronology
- Next → Season 2

The first season of the American reality competition show Top Chef Masters was broadcast on Bravo. It is a spin-off of Bravo's hit show Top Chef. In the first season, 24 world-renowned chefs competed against each other in weekly challenges. The program took place in Los Angeles. In the season finale that premiered on August 19, 2009, Rick Bayless was crowned Top Chef Master.

== Critics ==
- Kelly Choi (Host)
- Gael Greene (Critic)
- James Oseland (Critic)
- Jay Rayner (Critic) (alternates with Gail Simmons)
- Gail Simmons (Critic) (alternates with Jay Rayner)

== Master Contestants ==
There are 24 chefs competing in Top Chef Masters. In elimination order the contestants are:

=== Preliminary rounds ===
==== Episode 1 ====
- Michael Schlow — Radius Restaurant (Boston, MA)
- Tim Love — The Lonesome Dove Western Bistro (Fort Worth, TX)
- Christopher Lee — Aureole (New York, NY)
- Hubert Keller — Fleur de Lys (San Francisco, CA)

==== Episode 2 ====
- Elizabeth Falkner — citizen cake and Orson (San Francisco, CA)
- Wylie Dufresne — wd~50 (New York, NY)
- Graham Elliot — Graham Elliot (Chicago, IL)
- Suzanne Tracht — jar (Los Angeles, CA)

==== Episode 3 ====
- Cindy Pawlcyn — Mustards Grill (Napa Valley, CA)
- Ludovic Lefebvre — Ludo Bites (Los Angeles, CA)
- Wilo Benet — Pikayo (San Juan, Puerto Rico)
- Rick Bayless — Frontera Grill (Chicago, IL)

==== Episode 4 ====
- John Besh — Restaurant August, Lüke, Domenica and Besh Steak (New Orleans, LA)
- Douglas Rodriguez — Ola (Miami, FL) Alma de Cuba (Philadelphia, PA) Nuela (New York City, NY)
- Mark Peel — Campanile (Los Angeles, CA)
- Anita Lo — Annisa and Rickshaw Dumpling Bar (New York City, NY)

==== Episode 5 ====
- Lachlan Mackinnon-Patterson — Frasca Food & Wine (Boulder, CO)
- Rick Moonen — RM Seafood (Las Vegas, NV)
- Nils Norén — French Culinary Institute (New York City, NY)
- Michael Chiarello — Bottega (Yountville, CA)

==== Episode 6 ====
- Roy Yamaguchi — Roy's Restaurants (Honolulu, HI)
- Michael Cimarusti — Providence (Los Angeles, CA)
- Jonathan Waxman — Barbuto (New York, NY)
- Art Smith — table fifty-two (Chicago, IL) and Art and Soul (Washington, DC)

=== Champions' Round ===
- Suzanne Tracht — Jar (Los Angeles, CA)
- Art Smith — Table Fifty-Two (Chicago, IL)
- Anita Lo — Annisa (New York, NY)
- Hubert Keller — Fleur de Lys (San Francisco, CA)
- Michael Chiarello — Bottega Restaurant (Yountville, CA)
- Rick Bayless — Frontera Grill (Chicago, IL

=== Top Chef Master ===
- Rick Bayless — Frontera Grill (Chicago, IL)

== Masters' Progress ==
=== Preliminary rounds ===
Episode	Winner	Runner-up	3rd Place	4th Place
1	Hubert Keller; 20½ Stars	Christopher Lee; 19 Stars	Tim Love; 14½ Stars	Michael Schlow; 13½ Stars
2	Suzanne Tracht; 22½ Stars	Graham Elliot; 20½ Stars	Wylie Dufresne; 20 Stars	Elizabeth Falkner; 16½ Stars
3	Rick Bayless; 22½ Stars	Wilo Benet; 19½ Stars	Ludo Lefebvre; 16½ Stars	Cindy Pawlcyn; 15½ Stars
4	Anita Lo; 22½ Stars	Mark Peel; 18½ Stars	Douglas Rodriguez; 13 Stars	John Besh; 12 Stars
5	Michael Chiarello; 19½ Stars	Nils Noren; Rick Moonen; 17 Stars^{1}		Lachlan M. Patterson; 15½ Stars
6	Art Smith; 22 Stars	Jonathan Waxman; 20 Stars	Michael Cimarusti; 17½ Stars	Roy Yamaguchi; 15 Stars

(QF WIN) The chef won that episode's Quickfire challenge

^1 Rick Moonen and Nils Norén tied for second with 17 Stars each.

== Champions' Round ==
Episode	7	8	9	Finale	Cumulative Winnings
Quickfire; Winner	Rick; Hubert; Anita	Rick; Michael	Michael	None	
Rick	HIGH	HIGH	HIGH	WINNER	$110,000
Michael	IN	WIN	LOW	RUNNER-UP	$20,000
Hubert	IN	HIGH	WIN	RUNNER-UP	$20,000
Anita	WIN	LOW	OUT		$20,000
Art	LOW	OUT			$10,000
Suzanne	OUT				$10,000

(WINNER) The chef won the season and was crowned Top Chef: Master.
(RUNNER-UP) The chef was a runner-up for the season.
(WIN) The chef won that episode's elimination challenge.
(HIGH) The chef had one of the highest scores, but was not named the winner.
(IN) The chef was declared safe and wasn't eliminated, moved on in Champions' Round.
(LOW) The chef had one of the 2 lowest scores, but was not out.
(OUT) The chef lost that week's challenge and was cut.

== Episodes ==
In each episode, the chefs compete to win money for their charity. The Elimination Round winners are awarded cash donations ($10,000) for their charities. For each of the first six episodes, only four chefs compete out of the twenty-four and one of the four chefs moves forward to the Champions Round. Episode format: Each episode consists of a Quickfire and an Elimination challenge. The Quickfire is a short, simple challenge that can vary from cooking, tasting or a food-related task (e.g., peeling a certain amount of apples to certain quality standard in a limited amount of time). The Elimination challenge is a more complex challenge which usually requires cooking a meal for many people with certain requirements. The chefs are scored based on how well they execute in the Elimination and Quickfire challenges. Scoring: The Quickfire is scored on a scale of one to five stars, and the Elimination challenge is scored on a scale of one to 20 stars (five stars given by the tasters, and fifteen given by the three critics). A chef can thus win a maximum of 25 stars. The chef with the most stars at the end of both challenges is considered the winner and moves on to the Champions Round. The six total winners then meet up for the final four weeks when one person will be eliminated in each episode until the finale where one winner is crowned Top Chef Master. The winning chef receives $100,000 for his or her designated charity.

=== Episode 1: Masters Get Schooled ===
Christopher Lee, Hubert Keller, Michael Schlow, and Tim Love are the first group of chefs competing for one spot in the Champions Round.

- Quickfire Challenge: The chefs are challenged to create a creative and delicious dessert for a group of four Girl Scouts. Results:
  - Christopher Lee (French Toast and Caramelized Banana on a Stick with Maple Syrup Fluff) – 3½ stars
  - Hubert Keller (Chocolate Meringue Mousse, Fruit with Orange Foam and Tiny Surprises) – 5 stars
  - Michael Schlow (Milk Chocolate Cake with Peanut Butter Chocolate Candies and Honey Almond Cream) – 2½ stars
  - Tim Love (Strawberry Three Ways: Chocolate Covered Strawberry, Strawberry Milkshake and Chicken Fried Strawberry) – 3½ stars
    - WINNER: Hubert Keller
- Elimination Challenge: The chefs are challenged to create a three-course meal for the critics and a group of college students using only a microwave, a toaster oven, and a hot plate. They are restricted to a limited pantry and must cook in actual dorm rooms at Pomona College in Claremont, California. Results:
  - Christopher Lee (Red Snapper Ceviche with Citrus Juices, Avocado and Popcorn; Creamy Risotto with Prosciutto, Sage and Parmigiano Reggiano; Pork Chop with Pipérade, Crushed Potatoes, Mâche and Fennel Salad) – 15½ stars
  - Hubert Keller (Fresh Scottish Salmon over Creamy Whole Grain Mustard; Hearty Carrot and Petite Pea Soup with Cinnamon Croutons; Creamy Macaroni and Cheese with Prawns, Mushrooms and Fresh Herbs) – 15½ stars
  - Michael Schlow (Salmon Crudo with Cucumber, Mint, Red Chilies and Kumquat; Cabbage Soup with Smoked Bacon, Fennel and White Beans; Pork a la Apicius with Broccolini and Mushrooms) – 11 stars
  - Tim Love (Scallop Carpaccio with Lime and Chili; Squash and Corn "Pozole"; Skirt Steak and Braised Kale) – 11 stars
    - WINNER: Hubert Keller (20½ stars)
    - ELIMINATED:
      - 2nd: Christopher Lee (19 stars)
      - 3rd: Tim Love (14½ stars)
      - 4th: Michael Schlow (13½ stars)

=== Episode 2: The Lost Supper ===
Elizabeth Falkner, Graham Elliot Bowles, Suzanne Tracht, and Wylie Dufresne are the second group of chefs competing for one spot in the Champions Round.

- Quickfire Challenge: The chefs must create an amuse-bouche using ingredients found in a vending machine. This quickfire was originally used in Top Chef season 2, and season 2 contestants Ilan, Betty, and Michael were brought back to judge the quickfire. Results:
  - Elizabeth Falkner (Braised Beef Jerky with Orange Juice, Lemon and Horseradish Ice Cream) – 3½ stars
  - Graham Elliot Bowles (Tuna Salad with Ginger Orange Bubbles and Beef Jerky Miso Powder) – 4½ stars
  - Suzanne Tracht (Fried Shallot Rings with Microgreen Salad and Dr. Pepper Aioli) – 5 stars
  - Wylie Dufresne (Red Onion and Grilled Cheese Sandwich with Dr. Pepper Reduction) – 3 stars
    - WINNER: Suzanne Tracht
- Elimination Challenge: The chefs must make a meal inspired by the television series Lost. They must only use fresh and preserved ingredients purchased from a Dharma Initiative-themed shopping list, and they cannot use the Top Chef pantry. Results:
  - Elizabeth Falkner (Ancho-Beer Braised Boar Loin, Coffee Scented Poached Board Loin, Yam Papaya Pudding) – 13 stars
  - Graham Elliot Bowles (Maki Roll with Tuna & Dehydrated Pineapple, Tuna Niçoise, Tuna a la Plancha) – 16 stars
  - Suzanne Tracht (Risotto with Uni, Clams & Prawns, Wild Boar with Oyster Beer Sauce, Mango Corn Salad) – 17½ stars
  - Wylie Dufresne (Roasted Chicken with Poached Egg, Beets with Dried Corn, Plantain Purée) – 17 stars
    - WINNER: Suzanne Tracht (22½ stars)
    - ELIMINATED:
      - 2nd: Graham Elliot Bowles (20½ stars)
      - 3rd: Wylie Dufresne (20 stars)
      - 4th: Elizabeth Falkner (16½ stars)

=== Episode 3: Offal Tasty ===
Cindy Pawlcyn, Ludo Lefebvre, Rick Bayless, and Wilo Benet are the third group of chefs competing for one spot in the Champions Round.

- Quickfire Challenge: The chefs are challenged to create themed meals based on the colors red, orange, yellow and green, with each contestant drawing knives to see what color they must work with. Results:
  - Cindy Pawlcyn (Yellow – Yellow Vegetable Curry over Sweet Corn Grits and Fried Corn Tortillas) – 3½ stars
  - Ludo Lefebvre (Red – Steak Tartare with Watermelon, Red Onions, and Red Beet Gazpacho) – 3 stars
  - Rick Bayless (Green – Roasted Vegetables & Mole Verde with Tomatillos, Green Chilies and Pumpkin Seeds over a Banana Leaf) – 4 stars
  - Wilo Benet (Orange – Smoked Salmon Tartare with Coconut Milk and Tomato Paste Sauce) – 4½ stars
    - WINNER: Wilo Benet
- Elimination Challenge: The chefs are challenged to create offal-based street food entrees to be served at Universal Studios Hollywood, drawing to determine which offal from among beef tongue, beef heart, tripe, and pig's ear. Results:
  - Cindy Pawlcyn (tripe – Hot & Spicy Menudo) – 12½ stars
  - Ludo Lefebvre (pig's ear – Pig's Ear Quesadilla with Chorizo, Pinto Bean Pureé and Lime-Mint Aioli) – 13½ stars
  - Rick Bayless (beef tongue – Chorizo, Bacon and Tongue Tacos with Tomatillo Guacamole and Pickled Onions) – 18½ stars
  - Wilo Benet (beef heart – Beef Heart, Ham and Chicken "Tripleta" on Pita Bread with Spicy Mayonnaise) – 15 stars
    - WINNER: Rick Bayless (22½ stars)
    - ELIMINATED:
      - 2nd: Wilo Benet (19½ stars)
      - 3rd: Ludo Lefebvre (16½ stars)
      - 4th: Cindy Pawlcyn (15½ stars)

=== Episode 4: Magic Chefs ===
Anita Lo, Douglas Rodriguez, John Besh, and Mark Peel are the fourth group of chefs competing for one spot in the Champions Round.

- Quickfire Challenge: The chefs are challenged to create an egg dish while using only one hand. Results:
  - Anita Lo (Soft Scrambled Egg with Shiitake and Oyster Sauce) – 5 stars
  - Douglas Rodriguez (Corn Cake Arepas with Scrambled Eggs) – 3 stars
  - John Besh (Slow-cooked Eggs with Asparagus, Dandelion Greens and Mushroom Ragout) – ½ star
  - Mark Peel (Fresh Duck Egg Pasta with Cream Reduction and Cream Mayo) – 2½ stars
    - WINNER: Anita Lo
- Elimination Challenge: The chefs are challenged to create a meal for actor Neil Patrick Harris and a few of his friends, at The Magic Castle. The chefs must use one of the following magic words as the inspiration for their dish: Mystery, Surprise, Spectacle, or Illusion. Results:
  - Anita Lo – Illusion ("Surf or Turf": "Scallop with Caviar") (Seaside Braised Daikon Stuffed with Steak Tartare, Korean Flavors) – 17½ stars
  - Douglas Rodriguez – Spectacle (Oyster Ceviche with Duck Foie Gras and Fig Empanada with Frisee Salad) – 10 stars
  - John Besh – Surprise (Salmon tartare with cauliflower blini; Salmon roe salad with horseradish and creme fraiche sorbet; Tempura-fried lobster wrapped in smoked salmon) – 11½ stars
  - Mark Peel – Mystery (Tai Snapper Roasted in Parchment with a Shrimp, Lobster and Kaffir Lime Glaze) – 16 stars
    - WINNER: Anita Lo (22½ stars)
    - ELIMINATED:
      - 2nd: Mark Peel (18½ stars)
      - 3rd: Douglas Rodriguez (13 stars)
      - 4th: John Besh (12 stars)

=== Episode 5: Miniaturize Me ===
Lachlan MacKinnon-Patterson, Michael Chiarello, Nils Norén and Rick Moonen are the fifth group of chefs competing for one spot in the Champions Round.

- Quickfire Challenge: The chefs are challenged to turn classic junk food items into fine-dining cuisine. The cast of the television series Flipping Out are the diners for this challenge. Results:
  - Lachlan MacKinnon-Patterson (Prosciutto Stufado with Pork Hot Dog) – 3 stars
  - Michael Chiarello (Swordfish Meatballs with Fisherman's Sauce) – 4½ stars
  - Nils Norén (Shrimp with Creamed Corn, Capers and Pickled Cherry Tomatoes) – 3 stars
  - Rick Moonen (None) – 0 stars
    - WINNER: Michael Chiarello
      - NOTE: Rick Moonen did not plate a dish within the time limit. His attempted dish was "Shrimp Moondoggie with Herb Slaw and Mustard Caviar."
- Elimination Challenge: The chefs are challenged to create a mini three-course "meal" of hors d'œuvres for 100 people, without any help whatsoever. The meal must be based on an appetizer, an entree, and a dessert. Results:
  - Lachlan MacKinnon-Patterson ("Frutta Esotica" – Tempura Pineapple Wrapped in Speck; Grilled All-Natural Nebraska Beef Short Ribs; Strawberry Frangipane Tart with Yogurt Semifreddo) – 12½ stars
  - Michael Chiarello (Shaved Brussels Sprouts and Asparagus Salad; Pissed-Off Prawns with Olive Oil; Twenty-Year-Old Balsamic Marinated Strawberries with Goat Milk Basil Gelato and Bittersweet Chocolate Crème Fraiche) – 15 stars
  - Nils Norén (Scallop with Smoked Potato Cream, Apple and Curry; Salmon with Napa Cabbage, Chorizo, Broccoli Puree and Madeira; Chocolate-Goat Cheese Ganache, Cara Cara Orange Gel, Lapsang Cream) – 14 stars
  - Rick Moonen (Opakapaka and Barramundi Ceviche; Brandade of Shrimp and Scallop; Preserved Lemon Custard with Macadamia, Coconut and Pineapple Emulsion) – 17 stars
    - WINNER: Michael Chiarello (19½ stars)
    - ELIMINATED:
      - 2nd: Nils Norén (17 stars)
      - 2nd: Rick Moonen (17 stars)
      - 4th: Lachlan MacKinnon-Patterson (15½ stars)

=== Episode 6: Trick in a Box ===
Art Smith, Jonathan Waxman, Michael Cimarusti and Roy Yamaguchi are the sixth and final group of chefs competing for one spot in the Champions Round.

- Quickfire Challenge: The chefs are challenged to create a dish using items found in only one aisle of the grocery store Whole Foods, with each chef drawing knives to determine their aisle. However, they only have a budget of $20. The diners for this challenge are workers at Whole Foods. Results:
  - Art Smith (Multi-Grain Risotto with Crispy Grain Salad) – 4½ stars
  - Jonathan Waxman (Mint, Lentil and Roasted Red Pepper Salad) – 3½ stars
  - Michael Cimarusti (Chocolate Parfait with Ginger Sauternes Syrup and Sesame Crackers) – 5 stars
  - Roy Yamaguchi (Pasta with Fried Egg and Asian Flavors) – 4 stars
    - WINNER: Michael Cimarusti
- Elimination Challenge: The chefs are challenged to make a meal using ingredients one of their fellow chefs have chosen for them with each chef drawing knives to see who they get paired with. A group of culinary students joined the critics in the judging. Results:
  - Art Smith (Fried Chicken Leg with Smashed White Yams and Apples; Smothered Chicken Thigh with Cheddar Grits; Mango Pie with Sugar Crust) – 17½ stars
  - Jonathan Waxman (Pork Sausage and Chop with Cauliflower Celery Root Pureé, Black Truffle and Mandarin Red Wine Reduction) – 16½ stars
  - Michael Cimarusti (Loin of Lamb with Sunchoke Purée, Broccoli Rabe, Purple Cauliflower and Rosemary Mandarin Lamb Jus) – 12½ stars
  - Roy Yamaguchi (Short Rib Kalbi with Blood Orange Vinaigrette and Mahi Mahi with Yuzu Ginger Essence Sauce, Soy Mirin Broth and Soba Noodle Mixture) – 11 stars
    - WINNER: Art Smith (22 stars)
    - ELIMINATED:
      - 2nd: Jonathan Waxman (20 stars)
      - 3rd: Michael Cimarusti (17½ stars)
      - 4th: Roy Yamaguchi (15 stars)

=== Episode 7: Champions Round Begins ===
- Quickfire Challenge: The chefs are divided into two teams: Team Salt consists of Rick Bayless, Hubert Keller and Anita Lo. Team Pepper consists of Michael Chiarello, Art Smith, and Suzanne Tracht. The teams must slice five onions, dress four chickens, shuck 15 oysters, and separate five eggs and whip the whites so that they hold in an upside-down bowl for five seconds, all in the shortest amount of time.
  - WINNERS: Anita Lo, Hubert Keller and Rick Bayless (5 stars)
  - The losing team (Art Smith, Michael Chiarello and Suzanne Tracht) each got four stars.
- Elimination Challenge: After an informal session where each chef presents the group with their signature dish, each chef must recreate one of the other chef's dishes. The signature dishes are: Hubert Keller's Lobster and Truffle Cappuccino with Corn Madeline; Art Smith's Seared Grouper with Hearts of Palm, Trumpet Mushrooms, and Meyer Lemon; Anita Lo's Seared Scallops with Potato Puree and Bacon, Sea Urchin and Mustard Greens; Michael Chiarello's Fennel Balsamic Quail with Mosto Cotto Mostrada, Sauteed Greens, and Roasted Apples; Suzanne Tracht's Chopped Sirloin with Green Peppercorn sauce and Fried Egg; and Rick Bayless' Rack of Lamb and Black Pasilla Chile with Mission Figs.
  - Anita Lo: Hubert Keller's Corn Chawanmushi, Champagne Gelee and Lobster Biscuit Sandwich – 19 stars
  - Art Smith: Suzanne Tracht's Ground Lamb Scotch Egg, Sweet Potato Fries and Tomato Tart – 11 stars
  - Hubert Keller: Anita Lo's Seared Scallop with Cream of Sea Urchin over Fingerling Mashed Potatoes – 16½ stars
  - Michael Chiarello: Rick Bayless's Rack of Lamb Stuffed with Fig Mostarda, Chickpeas and Fried Rosemary – 14½ stars
  - Rick Bayless: Michael Chiarello's Quail with Parsnip and Prosciutto Stuffing over Wild Greens – 18 stars
  - Suzanne Tracht: Art Smith's Roast Grouper with Gnocchi, Peas, Bacon, and Parsnip – 10½ stars
    - WINNER: Anita Lo (24 stars)
    - ELIMINATED: Suzanne Tracht (14½ stars)

=== Episode 8: Dietary Restrictions ===
- Quickfire Challenge: The chefs are challenged to create a gourmet take on the common hamburger and serve it to chef Sang Yoon, former Top Chef contestant Spike Mendelsohn, and documentary filmmaker Morgan Spurlock.
  - Anita Lo – Cheddar Burger soup with ketchup crouton and onion rings (1½ stars)
  - Art Smith – Hoe Cake burger with coleslaw and fried green tomatillos (3½ stars)
  - Hubert Keller – Beef and Roquefort burger with onions and potatoes (3 stars)
  - Michael Chiarello – Hamburguesa Enorme with truffle potato chips (4 stars)
  - Rick Bayless – Queso Fundido burger with three kinds of Guacamole (4 stars)
    - WINNERS: Michael Chiarello and Rick Bayless
- Elimination Challenge: The chefs have to come up with a five-course meal for actress and musician Zooey Deschanel, who does not eat foods containing gluten or soy and is a vegan, and 20 other people.
  - Anita Lo – Spicy Grilled Eggplant with Lentil Salad and Cashew puree (11½ stars)
  - Art Smith – Strawberry Champagne Soup with Strawberry Rice Ice Cream and Almond Brittle. (9 stars)
  - Hubert Keller – White Gazpacho with Timbale of Avocado and Asparagus and Roasted Beet salad. (16 stars)
  - Michael Chiarello – Quinoa Noodles with Salsa Verde, Gremolata, and dried Heirloom Tomatoes. (18 stars)
  - Rick Bayless – Corn Tamale with Braised Beans, Braised Greens, and Mushrooms. (15 stars)
    - WINNER: Michael Chiarello (22 stars)
    - ELIMINATED: Art Smith (12½ stars)

=== Episode 9: Masters of Disaster ===
- Quickfire Challenge: The chefs are challenged to identify ingredients while blindfolded.
  - Anita Lo – 6 ingredients correctly identified (4 stars)
  - Hubert Keller – 5 ingredients correctly identified (3½ stars)
  - Michael Chiarello – 7 ingredients correctly identified (5 stars)
  - Rick Bayless – 6 ingredients correctly identified (4 stars)
    - WINNER: Michael Chiarello
- Elimination Challenge: Each chef must create a buffet-style meal for 200 guests. Chefs are allowed to choose three past Top Chef contestants as their sous chefs. Two hours before service, the venue is changed from an indoor dining room to an outdoor terrace. One hour later, it is announced that one sous chef per contestant must be dropped; Jamie, Spike, Brian, and Betty are chosen.
  - Anita Lo (teamed with Ilan Hall, Dale Talde, and Jamie Lauren) – Asian buffet with an array of sauces and condiments (13 stars)
  - Hubert Keller (teamed with Antonia Lofaso, Elia Aboumrad, and Spike Mendelsohn) – 18-Dish Buffet (18½ stars)
  - Michael Chiarello (teamed with Fabio Viviani, CJ Jacobsen, and Brian Malarkey) – Rustic Italian Buffet (14½ stars)
  - Rick Bayless (teamed with Richard Blais, Alex Eusebio, and Betty Fraser) – Mexican Food Buffet (17½ stars)
    - WINNER: Hubert Keller (22 stars)
    - ELIMINATED: Anita Lo (17 stars)

=== Episode 10: Finale ===
- Final Challenge: In the challenge, the finalists are tasked with preparing a four-course meal that is their biography. The first course is their first cooking memory. The second course is the meal that encouraged them to become a chef. The third course is the food that represents their first restaurant. And the fourth course represents who they are now, and who they want to become. There are two twists in this episode. First, the diners include the Top Chefs from the previous five seasons (Harold Dieterle, Ilan Hall, Hung Huynh, Stephanie Izard, and Hosea Rosenberg), as well as Padma Lakshmi, Tom Colicchio, and Gail Simmons. Since there was no quick-fire, the diners score counts for 25% of the total. The second twist was a video appeared of the sous chefs of each of the finalists appearing, and wishing them good luck before the sous chefs walked into the kitchen to help their respective bosses.
  - Hubert Keller:
    - "Baeckeoffe": Alsatian Lamb, Beef, Pork and Potato Stew
    - Salmon Soufflé with Royal Osetra Caviar and Riesling Sauce, Choucroute Flan
    - Lamb Chop with Vegetable Mousseline, Blanched Garlic and Vanilla-Merlot Sauce
    - Wagyū Beef Cheeks and Celery Purée with Pinot Noir, Lemongrass and Ginger Sauce
  - Michael Chiarello:
    - Crispy Potato Gnocchi with Black Truffle and Taleggio Fonduta and Ricotta Gnocchi with Old Hen Tomato Sauce
    - Ancient Grain Polenta with Wild Mushroom and Balsamic Rabbit Ragu, Asparagus and Grilled Rabbit Liver
    - Ginger Stuffed Rouget with Mango Salad, Fresh Wasabi and Bottarga
    - Brined Short Ribs with 5 Onion Cavolo Nero and Essence of Smoldering Vines
  - Rick Bayless:
    - Barbequed Quail with Hickory House Sauce, Sour Slaw and Watermelon Salad
    - Seared Ahi Tuna over Oaxacan Black Mole with Braised Chicken, Plantain Tamales, and Grilled Nopales
    - Achiote-Marinated Cochinita Pibil with Sunchoke Purée, Crispy Pigs Feet and Pickled Red Onion
    - Arroz a la Tumbada with Tomato-Jalapeño Broth and Chorizo Air

Rick Bayless won the title of Top Chef Master and the $100,000 to his charity, Frontera Farmer Foundation.

- WINNER: Rick Bayless (18 stars)
- RUNNERS-UP:
  - Michael Chiarello (17 stars)
  - Hubert Keller (16½ stars)
