= Michael's (restaurant) =

Restaurant information
- Established: 1979
- Owner: Michael McCarty
- Food type: California cuisine
- Location: Santa Monica, California, United States
- Other locations: New York City
- Website: michaelssantamonica.com

Michael's is an American restaurant located in Santa Monica, California that was opened in 1979 by restaurateur Michael McCarty.

A second Michael's location was opened at 24 West 55th Street in New York City in 1989.

Alumni of the kitchen include Jonathan Waxman, Mark Peel, Nancy Silverton, Sang Yoon, Roy Yamaguchi, and Brooke Williamson.

In 2024, the restaurant celebrated its 45th anniversary with a charity event which invited some of the restaurant's top chefs to return to cook for an evening. The New York location celebrated its 35th anniversary the same year.

== Legacy ==
The Michelin Guide says: "In Los Angeles, Michael McCarty brought farmer’s-market-driven cuisine to Southern California in 1979 when he opened Michael’s in Santa Monica, which quickly became a celebrity haunt".
