= Alois Kracher =

Austrian winemaker

Alois Kracher Jr. (23 February 1959 – 5 December 2007, in Illmitz) was one of the most successful winemakers of Austria, and was known under the nickname "Luis". The wines from his vineyard Weinlaubenhof Kracher reached a world reputation and high acclaim from international wine critics such as Robert M. Parker, Jr., who awarded 98 points or higher on his famous 100-point scale to several of Kracher's wines. His fame was mainly built on his sweet wines, so called Trockenbeerenauslesen (TBA) of high sweetness and enormous concentration that results from the development of noble rot on the grapes. Local conditions on the shallow Lake Neusiedl, where the Kracher vineyards are situated, are conducive to the development of Botrytis cinerea (the fungus responsible for noble rot).

== Biography ==
Kracher first studied chemistry and worked as a chemist in the pharmaceutical industry. In 1981 he started working part-time as a winemaker in the winery of his father Alois Kracher Senior (born 1929), and from 1986 this became a full-time activity for Alois, with focus on sweet wines. He brought fame to the business with his new style of sweet TBAs. Alois Senior continued to work in the vineyards while Alois Junior was in charge of winemaking and overall management. This first vintage to receive broad acclaim was 1991.

In 2007, Kracher died of pancreatic cancer at the age of 48 in Illmitz, Burgenland, Austria. He was married and had a son, Gerhard Kracher (born 1981), who at the time of Alois' death had been working in the family's wine business for a number of years.

== Awards and acclaim ==
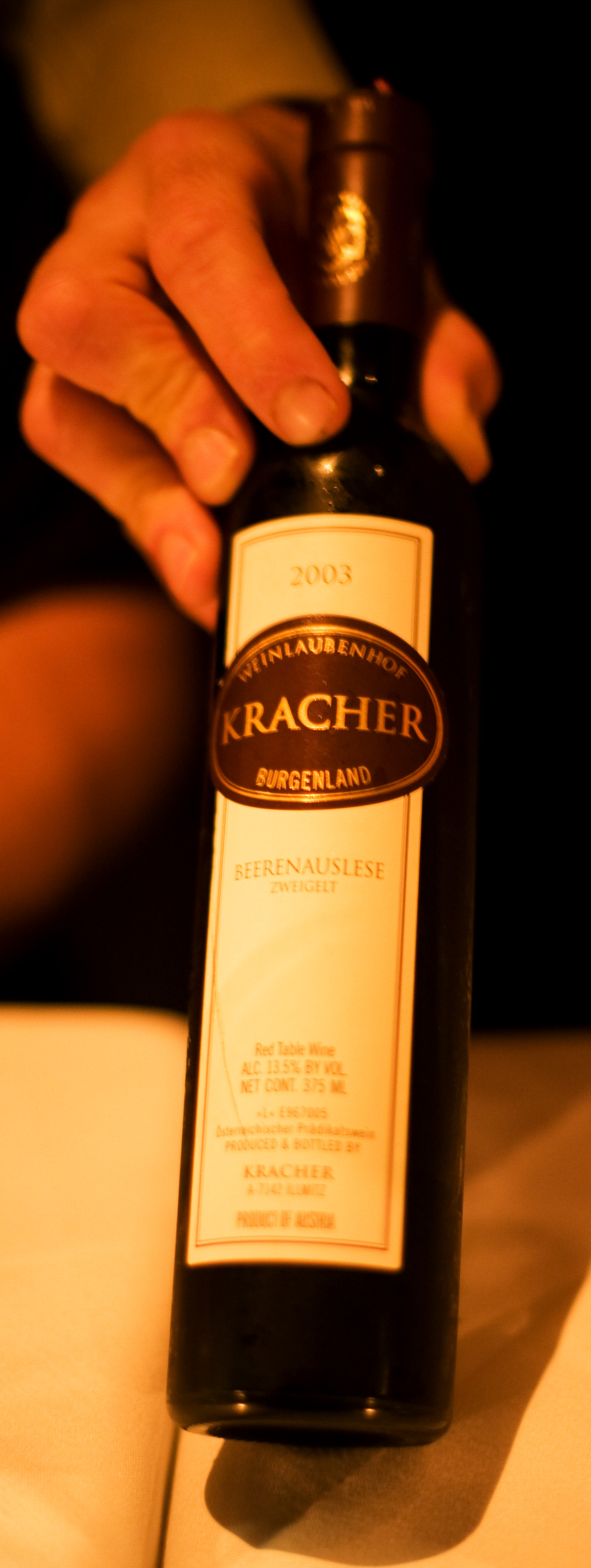
"Kracher" Zweigelt Beerenauslese, 2003

Beginning in 1994, he received numerous awards for his wines. Kracher was the recipient of several prizes from various sources for best Austrian wine or winery of the year, sweet wine maker of the year and such, including "Winemaker of the Year" by the London-based Wine Journal six times. He was also active in California where he and fellow Austrian Manfred Krankl (who runs the Sine Qua Non winery) produced sweet wines under the label Mr. K. During his lifetime, he was the only Austrian winemaker to receive a straight 100-point score by Robert M. Parker's The Wine Advocate, although that score was awarded to a Mr. K wine, the 2004 Mr. K The Strawman, a Vin de Paille from Semillon. With Boston-based Spanish importer Jorge Ordóñez, Kracher created a winery in Málaga, Spain, making dry and sweet muscat wines from old hillside vineyards.
