= Nancy Silverton =

American chef, baker, and author (born 1954)

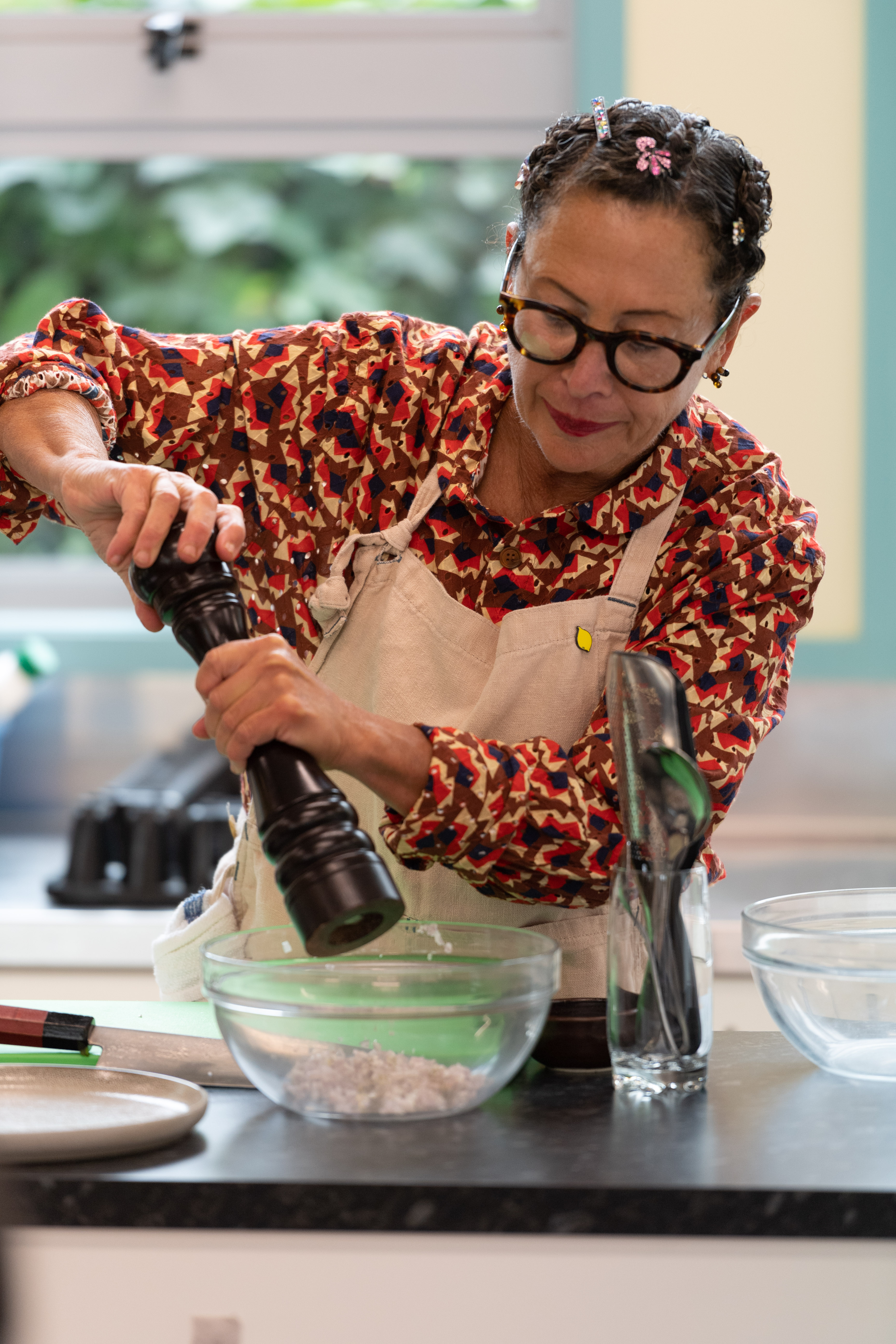
- Silverton at St Mary's College in August 2019
- Born: June 20, 1954 (age 72); Los Angeles, California, U.S.
- Education: Le Cordon Bleu, London; Ecole Lenotre Culinary Institute
- Occupations: Chef; baker; restaurateur; author
- Years active: 1979–present
- Notable work: The Mozza Cookbook; Breads from the LaBrea Bakery
- Spouse: Mark Peel (m. 1984; div. 2007)
- Children: 3
- Culinary career
- Cooking style: California; Italian; New American
- Current restaurants
- Osteria Mozza; Pizzeria Mozza chi SPACCA
- Previous restaurants
- Campanile; Pizzette; The Barish
- Awardss
- Lifetime Achievement Award, James Beard Foundation (2026); Best of Food and Entertaining (1999) Bon Appétit; Pastry Chef of the Year, James Beard Foundation (1990)

Nancy Silverton (born June 20, 1954) is an American chef, baker, restaurateur, and author. The winner of the James Beard Foundation Lifetime Achievement award, she is recognized for her role in popularizing sourdough and artisan breads in the United States.

== Early life and education ==
Silverton grew up in Sherman Oaks and Encino in Southern California's San Fernando Valley. Her mother, Doris, was a writer for the soap opera General Hospital and her father, Larry, was a lawyer. She enrolled at Sonoma State University in Rohnert Park, California as a political science major and decided to become a chef in her freshman year after she had what she later described as an epiphany. "I was cooking in the dorms in a stainless steel kitchen, cooking vegetarian food, and I remember this light bulb went on and I thought, 'Oh wait, this is what I want to do for the rest of my life,' " she said in a September 2013 interview with Food GPS.

Silverton dropped out of Sonoma State in her senior year, opting to train formally as a chef at Le Cordon Bleu in London. In 1979, after her graduation, she returned to Southern California, where she worked with pastry chef Jimmy Brinkeley and chef Jonathan Waxman at Michael's, a restaurant in Santa Monica. Inspired by his creativity, she attended Ecole Lenotre Culinary Institute in Plaisir, France, furthering her studies.

== Career ==
=== Spago, Campanile, LaBrea Bakery ===
Silverton moved to Los Angeles in 1982 and was hired by Wolfgang Puck as Spago's opening pastry chef, and in 1986, she wrote her first cookbook, Desserts.

In 1989, Silverton and her late husband, chef Mark Peel, opened Campanile with Manfred Krankl. Critic Jonathan Gold later wrote, "It is hard to overstate Campanile's contributions to American cooking." Silverton and Peel opened La Brea Bakery in a space which adjoined the main restaurant prior to the opening of Campanile. Silverton served as the head baker at the bakery and the head pastry chef at the restaurant, which was located on La Brea Avenue in the Hancock Park area of Los Angeles.

Silverton had experience baking bread while a pastry chef at Spago, and began to experiment with recipes after she read an article about Acme, an artisan bakery in Berkeley, California. She used the natural yeast from grapes, soaking them for days in flour and water. She shaped the loaves by hand, and let them rise twice over a two-day period. After six months and "hundreds" of attempts to perfect the recipe, she was satisfied.On Thanksgiving in 1990, the line to buy bread stretched around the block and partway down a side street.

Silverton and Peel were well known through their work at Spago and Michael's. It was difficult for customers to get reservations at Campanile due to its popularity, and during their first year, annual sales exceeded $2 million. Silverton baked bread all night, slept briefly, and woke mid-morning to prepare pastries and desserts for the restaurant. Then she would nap again before dinner. In 1991, she won the James Beard Foundation's Outstanding Pastry Chef award. The Los Angeles Times wrote that she had "not only given Los Angeles great bread, but through her work at Campanile, she has virtually redefined what dessert is."

In 1992, she and Krankl went back to the group of investors who had funded Campanile, and built a much larger, fully staffed, commercial bakery. At the same time, they split the bakery into a separate entity. Silverton became less involved with the bakery in 1993, serving mainly as an advisor. In 1996, her second book, Nancy Silverton's Breads from the La Brea Bakery: Recipes for the Connoisseur, was published. In 1997, Silverton appeared on PBS's Baking with Julia featuring Julia Child. Silverton prepared a crème fraîche brioche torte with fresh fruit poached in white wine that moved Child to tears. "It's a dessert to cry over," Child said. "That's a triumph."^{,}

In 1998, Silverton began "Grilled Cheese Night" at Campanile. It became a trend, and Silverton was referred to as the "godmother of grilled cheese sandwiches" on NBC Her book Nancy Silverton's Sandwich Book: The Best Sandwiches Ever--from Thursday Nights at Campanile was published in 2005. In 2001, an Irish investment group, IAWS, purchased La Brea Bakery for a price reported to range from $56 million to $68.5 million. Silverton earned more than $5 million in the sale, and invested with Bernard Madoff; her profits were lost in 2008 with the collapse of his pyramid scheme. In 2005, she and Peel separated; Silverton left Campanile after their divorce in 2007. The restaurant closed in October 2012.

=== Los Angeles restaurants ===
In 2007, Silverton partnered with Joseph Bastianich and his family's restaurant group to open Pizzeria Mozza on the corner of Melrose Ave and Highland Ave in Los Angeles, California. Osteria Mozza, which served traditional Italian cuisine with an emphasis on Californian seasonality, was opened next door. A year after opening, Osteria Mozza received its first Michelin star. Osteria Mozza holds a green Michelin star for its sustainability efforts.

chi SPACCA opened in 2013. It was based on a concept developed from the family-style salumi dinners previously held at Scuola di Pizza, which occupied the same premises. The restaurant established the first in-house “dry cure” program in Los Angeles, aimed at developing Italian charcuterie techniques.

Silverton established Pizzeria Mozza in 2012 in Newport Beach and Pizette in Culver City in 2019. The Newport Beach location closed in October 2024. Pizzette closed in 2023. The Barish, located in the Hollywood Roosevelt Hotel, also closed in 2023.

In November 2025, Silverton opened Max & Helen's, a diner-style restaurant, with long-time collaborator Phil Rosenthal.

=== Nancy's Fancy and Ojai ===
In June 2015, Silverton launched Nancy's Fancy, a line of seven flavors of gelato and sorbetto, sold in supermarkets. Originally based in Chatsworth, the company moved to a 6,000 square foot warehouse in the downtown LA Arts District in 2015.

Silverton was named Culinary Ambassador of the Farmhouse food and event space in Ojai, California in early 2019. She has co-hosted events at the Ojai Valley Inn. She participated in the first ever Ojai Food + Wine Festival.

== Personal life ==
Silverton has been a member of the Macy's Culinary Council since 2003. She is involved in Meals on Wheels programs in Chicago, New York, and Los Angeles.

== Selected awards and distinctions ==
- James Beard Lifetime Achievement Award (2026)
- Eater's TV Chef of the Year (2017)
- Outstanding Chef, James Beard Foundation Award (2014)
- International Star Diamond Award for Outstanding Hospitality (2010)
- RCA Pioneer Award (2003)
- James Beard, nominated for Outstanding Service (2003)
- James Beard, nominated for Outstanding Service (2002)
- James Beard Outstanding Restaurant Award, Campanile (2001)
- IACP Julia Child Cookbook Awards Nominee (1997)
- James Beard, Nominee, Best Cookbook of the Year, Baking (1997)
- Los Angeles Culinary Master of the Year, The 1994 Fine Spirit Wine & Food Tasting Exhibition (1994)
- James Beard "Who's Who in American Cooking" (1990)
- James Beard Best Pastry Chef of the Year (1990)
- Food & Wine Magazine, Best New Chefs (1990)

== Selected appearances ==
In 2017, Silverton was featured on an episode of Chef's Table and she was a guest judge on Sugar Rush in 2018.Silverton appeared in the "New York City" episode of Somebody Feed Phil. She appears often on Top Chef and made an appearance on season seven of MasterChef Junior.She often appears as a judge on Tournament of Champions and appeared on season 11 of MasterChef.She made her debut as a judge on Guy's Grocery Games in July, 2021.

== Bibliography ==
- Desserts; Harper & Row; ISBN 978-0061817700; 1986
- Mark Peel & Nancy Silverton at Home: Two Chefs Cook for Family & Friends; with Mark Peel; Warner Books; ISBN 0446517364. 1994
- Breads from the La Brea Bakery; Villard Books; ISBN 0-679-40907-6; 1996
- The Food of Campanile: Recipes from the Famed Los Angeles Restaurant; with Mark Peel; Villard Books; ISBN 0812992032. 1997
- Nancy Silverton's Pastries from the La Brea Bakery; Villard Books; ISBN 0-375-50193-2; 2000
- Nancy Silverton's Sandwich Book: The Best Sandwiches Ever—from Thursday Nights at Campanile; Knopf; ISBN 0-375-41260-3; 2005
- A Twist of the Wrist: Quick Flavorful Meals with Ingredients from Jars, Cans, Bags, and Boxes; Knopf; ISBN 1400044073; 2007
- The Mozza Cookbook: Recipes from Los Angeles's Favorite Italian Restaurant and Pizzeria; with Matt Molina, Carolynn Carreno and Mario Batali; Knopf; ISBN 0307272842; 2011
- Mozza at Home: More than 150 Crowd-pleasing Recipes for Relaxed, Family-Style Entertaining: A Cookbook; with Carolynn Carreno; Penguin Random House; ISBN 978-0-385-35432-5
- Chi Spacca: A New Approach to American Cooking; with Ryan DeNicola and Carolynn Carreno; Penguin Random House; ISBN 978-0-525-65465-0
- The Cookie That Changed My Life: and More Than 100 Other Classic Cakes, Cookies, Muffins, and Pies That Will Change Yours: A Cookbook; with Carolynn Carreno; Penguin Random House; ISBN 978-0-593-32166-9, 978-0-593-32167-6

== See also ==
Campanile

La Brea Bakery
