= Baby Bistro =

Restaurant in Los Angeles, California, U.S.

- Interactive map of Baby Bistro

Restaurant information
- Food type: American; California
- Location: 1027 Alpine Street, Los Angeles, California, United States
- Coordinates: 34°03′56″N 118°14′49″W
- Website: babybistrola.com

Baby Bistro is a restaurant in Los Angeles, California, United States. It originated as a pop-up restaurant and serves American / California cuisine. It was included in The New York Times's 2025 list of the 50 best restaurants in the U.S.
