= Suzanne Tracht =

American Chef (born 1963)

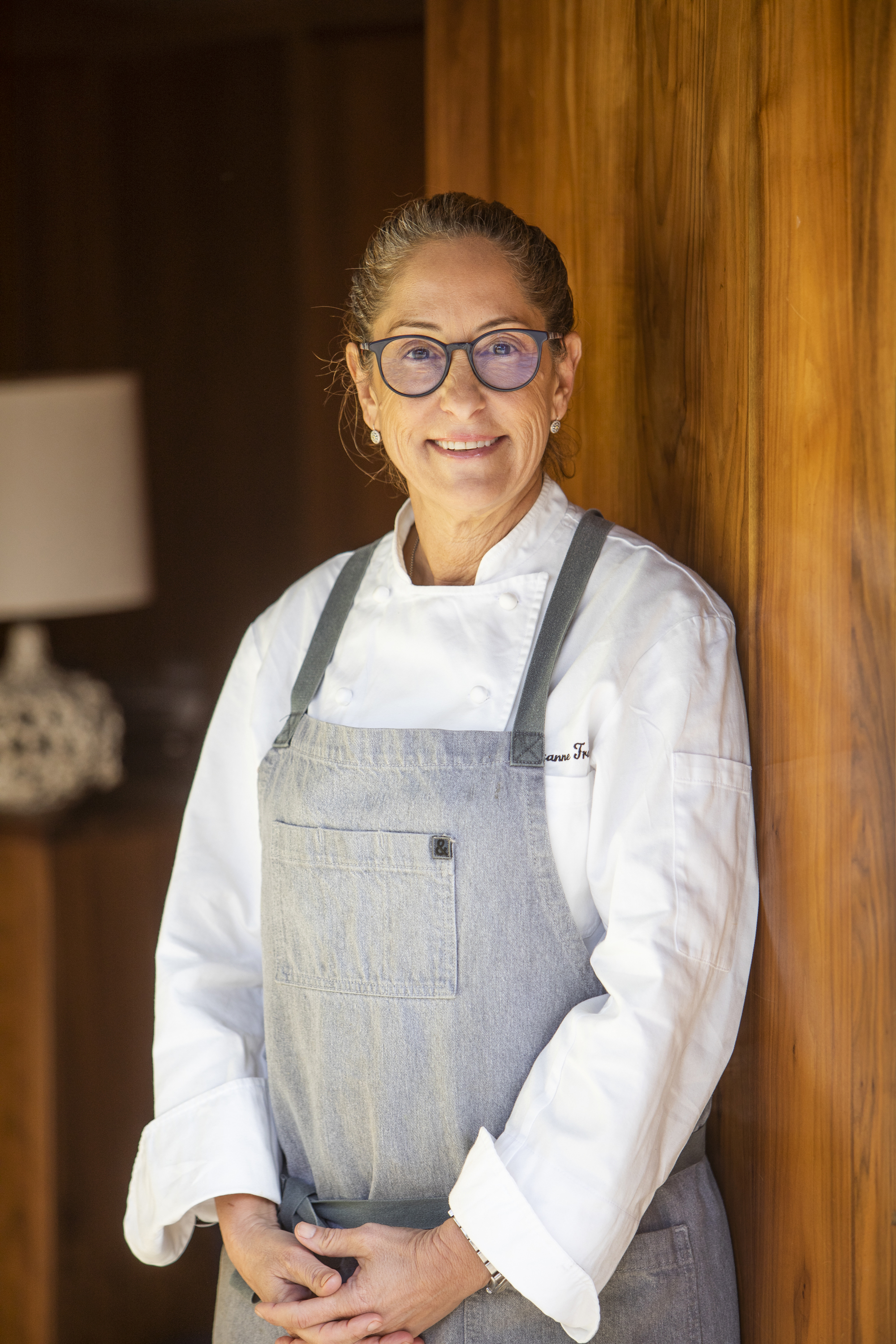
- Born: 1963 (age 61–62)
- Culinary career
- Current restaurant(s): Jar
- Previous restaurant(s): Tracht's
- Television show(s): Top Chef Masters
- Award(s) won: Best New Chef 2002 Nation's Restaurant News's Fine Dining Hall of Fame.[3] 2009m Chef of the Year Angeleno magazine

Suzanne Tracht (born 1963) is an American chef. In 2002, Food & Wine named her to their Best New Chefs. She has appeared as a guest on many shows, such as Hell's Kitchen, Top Chef Masters, Today, Entertainment Tonight, and many more. She has won many awards and honors for her cooking, specifically her signature braising.

== Early life ==
Tracht was born and raised in 1963, in Phoenix, Arizona. At 19, she began a three-year apprenticeship at the Arizona Biltmore Hotel under chef Siegbert Wendler, which is where she began cooking professionally.

== Career ==
After her apprenticeship under Wendler ended, Tracht worked at the Westin Century Plaza and then the Hotel Bel-Air, where she worked with George Morrone. In 1991, She moved to Beverly Hills, California to become the sous chef of Noa Noa, a Cal-Asian fusion restaurant.

In 1992, Tracht worked at a restaurant in Southern California named Campanile where she became chef de cuisine, working with Nancy Silverton and Mark Peel. Tracht has said that working at Campanile was one of the most valuable and experiences in her culinary career. In 1996, Tracht then opened a Cal-Asian fusion restaurant named Jozu, as executive chef. During her time at Jozu, she worked with Preech Narkthong, who would become her chef de cuisine when she opened her first restaurant. Tracht's work at Jozu helped her gain popularity and following. In its first year open, Jozu was placed at number two in for “L.A.’s Best New Restaurants” list in the Los Angeles magazine’s annual restaurant issue.

In 2001, Tracht opened steakhouse restaurant Jar, an acronym for "just another restaurant", in Los Angeles's Beverly Grove neighborhood with Peel. The Wall Street Journal described it as "a modern take on a classic, 1940s-style chop house". It is known for its pot roast and char siu pork. Jar has been among Los Angeles’ top 75 restaurants list named in the magazine for many consecutive years.

In 2007 Tracht opened Tracht's in Long Beach. She closed it after a few years. Today, Tracht is recognized as one of the top female chefs in the United States.

== Reception and awards ==
According to the Wall Street Journal, Tracht "has become nationally known for her pot roast", which has been on the menu continuously since Jar and Tracht's opened. In 2014, Jonathan Gold said, "She should be winning national awards, but she is content with making a great wedge salad and the best pot roast in town." In 2022 Time Out called Jar "a dining institution" in Los Angeles.

In 2002, after she opened Jar, Food & Wine named her one of their Best New Chefs. In 2007 she was inducted into Nation's Restaurant News's Fine Dining Hall of Fame.

In 2003, 2005, and 2009, Tracht participated in Fortune magazine’s Most Powerful Women Summit. In 2009, Tracht was named Chef of the Year by high-end luxury magazine Angeleno. That same year, Tracht was honored at the 2009 Women in Food James Beard Foundation Awards gala in New York. She has been a featured chef in multiple occasions: she was a featured chef at the 2010 World Equestrian Games in Kentucky, as well as a host chef for Argentina444.

== Philanthropy ==
Tracht has supported local food resource center SOVA and Project Angel Food, which delivers meals to people with serious illness.

== Personal life ==
Tracht has two children.
