= Nancy's Fancy =

American brand of gelato and sorbet

- Founded: June 2015
- Headquarters: Los Angeles, California, United States
- Area served: United States
- Key people: Nancy Silverton
- Products: Ice Cream
- Number of employees: 50
- Website: Official Website

Nancy's Fancy is a small batch American gelato and sorbetto company. Based in Los Angeles, CA, the line was founded in 2015 by James Beard Foundation Award winner Nancy Silverton.

Nancy's Fancy uses ingredients from local markets to produce 15 flavors of gelato and sorbetto in pints. The company's production facility is located in a 6,000 square foot warehouse in the Arts District of Downtown, Los Angeles.
