= Osteria Mozza =

Restaurants in Los Angeles, California, Washington DC, and Singapore

- Interactive map of Osteria Mozza

Restaurant information
- Established: 2007; 19 years ago
- Head chef: Nancy Silverton
- Food type: Italian
- Rating: (Michelin Guide)
- Location: 6602 Melrose Avenue, Hollywood, California, 90038, United States
- Coordinates: 34°5′0″N 118°20′19.7″W
- Other locations: 3276 M St NW, Georgetown, Washington, District of Columbia, 20007, United States Mozza Baja California Sur
- Website: osteriamozza.com, osteriamozzadc.com

Osteria Mozza is a Michelin-starred Italian restaurant in Hollywood, California, with additional locations in Singapore and Washington, D.C.

In 2007, Nancy Silverton partnered with New York chef Mario Batali and his frequent collaborator Joseph Bastianich to open an Italian restaurant, Osteria Mozza. Reminiscent of the evolution of La Brea Bakery, a pizzeria, Pizzeria Mozza, opened in an adjoining space prior to the opening of the main restaurant.

Osteria Mozza later opened restaurants in Newport Beach, California (Pizzeria Mozza, closed in October 2024), Singapore, and most recently Georgetown in partnership with restauranteur Stephen Starr, inside of historic Georgetown Market built in 1865. Mozza also opened in Baja California Sur on Costa Palmas Property in 2021.

The original Mozza location has since grown to include Mozza2Go and a third restaurant, Chi Spacca, which focuses on meats.

== Reception ==
The Los Angeles Times gave it a four-star review, and The New York Times called it a "serious and impressive restaurant." It was nominated as Best New Restaurant by the James Beard Foundation the year it opened, and was awarded a Michelin star in 2008. Osteria Mozza maintained its Michelin star in the 2025 Michelin Guide for California.

Although the restaurant's entire menu was widely praised, Silverton's interpretation of antipasti as a Mozzarella bar won particular recognition, with Zagat's noting that she had "perfected the art of cheese."

== See also ==
- List of Italian restaurants
- List of Michelin-starred restaurants in California
- Pizzeria Mozza
