= Supermarket Superstar =

American cooking competition television series

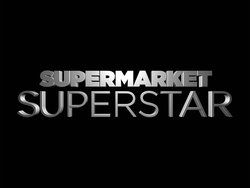
- Genre: Cooking; Baking
- Presented by: Stacy Keibler
- Judges: Chris Cornyn; Debbi Fields; Michael Chiarello
- Country of origin: United States
- Original language: English
- No. of seasons: 1
- No. of episodes: 10

Production
- Executive producers: Aaron Saidman; Barbara Schneeweiss; Bob Weinstein; Eli Holzman; Gena McCarthy; Harvey Weinstein; Meryl Poster; Michael Chiarello; Rhett Bachner; Rob Sharenow; Stephen H. Schwartz; Stephen Lambert
- Running time: 42 minutes
- Production companies: B17 Entertainment; Studio Lambert; The Weinstein Company

Original release
- Network: Lifetime
- Release: July 22 – September 26, 2013

Supermarket Superstar is an American cooking reality competition television series that aired from July to September 2013 on Lifetime. Produced by Eli Holzman, Rhett Bachner, Michael Chiarello and Bob and Harvey Weinstein, it was hosted by Stacy Keibler. In each episode, three aspiring food entrepreneurs competed for a chance to win $10,000 in cash and consultation services valued at $100,000 from DINE Marketing and Mattson. In the final episode, three previous winners competed for a chance to have their products introduced and sold in The Great Atlantic & Pacific Tea Company (A&P) family of supermarkets. The panel of judges ("mentors") was Debbi Fields of Mrs. Fields Bakeries, Chris Cornyn of DINE and Chiarello.

== Format ==
Three contestants each present a product to the mentors in the product-pitch segment. After receiving an evaluation from the mentors, they modify the product in the test kitchen (taking into consideration price, taste, nutrition and shelf life) in the recipe-revamp segment. The contestants have 90 minutes to make changes. In the kitchen, they receive more advice and criticism from Chiarello and research-and-development expert Andrew Hunter. The finished product is presented to a focus group, who eat and discuss it with Fields before filling out a survey in the focus-test segment. After the focus group's comments are reviewed, Chirarello announces which dish was rated highest and which contestant is eliminated. The remaining two contestants then work on the logo and packaging of their products with graphic designers from 99designs and mentoring from Chris Cornyn of DINE Marketing in the brand-development segment. The products and designs are presented to "the supermarket buyer", A&P Supermarkets operating partner Tom Dahlen. Dahlen is joined in his office by the mentors and Keibler, who give him their opinion before the contestants return and he announces the winner. In the final episode, Dahlen is joined by A&P president and CEO Sam Martin to pick the winner.

== Episodes ==
No.	Title	Original release date	Prod. code	U.S. viewers (millions)
1	"Cakes"	July 22, 2013	109	0.44
Competing in this episode are: Sean Allen, a longshoreman from Redondo CA (alcohol-infused cupcakes), Latrice Pace from Atlanta GA, a gospel singer (peach cobbler cupcakes) and Melissa Randall from Glendale CA, a children's party entertainer and founder of Baking with Melissa (butterscotch chocolate chip cookie cupcakes). Focus Group: newlyweds. Focus Group chooses: Latrice. Focus Group eliminates: Sean. Winner: Latrice.
2	"Global Cuisine"	July 29, 2013	105	0.23
Competing in this episode are: Ksenia a Russian immigrant (piroshski) from El Segundo, CA, Dominic food truck owner of Don Chow Tacos from Los Angeles, (kung pao chicken wraped in a tamale masa ) and Liza a cook with a family recipe (homestyle Portuguese linguica soup) from Douglasville, GA. Focus Group: food bloggers. Focus Group eliminates: Ksenia. Winner: Dominic.
3	"Natural Foods"	August 8, 2013	103	0.63
Competing in this episode are Hannah, a schoolteacher from Santa Cruz CA on a mission for her son with a neurological disorder (cream filled cookie/brownie sandwich), Hoda, a food truck entrepreneur from Hoboken NJ (healthy apple pie-ish dish), and John, a businessman from Canyon CA with a passion for eating bugs (protein/energy bar with crickets). Focus Group: personal trainers. Focus Group winner: Hannah. Focus Group eliminates: Hoda. Winner: Hannah.
4	"Baked Goods"	August 15, 2013	107	0.75
Competing in this episode are: Tekisha from Indianapolis, IN (frozen lemon cheesecake butter cookie sandwich), Megan a PR worker from Beverly Hills, CA (peaches and cream praline bread), and injured stuntman Tony from Santa Monica, CA (savory scones with bacon). Focus Group: bakers. Focus Group eliminates: Megan. Winner: Tekisha.
5	"Spreads & Dips"	August 22, 2013	102	0.57
Competing in this episode are: Jackie from Los Angeles, who runs a website devoted to cooking and baking with beer (beer and bacon jam); Patricia, an empty nester from Kingston Jamaica now living in Boston and working as a caterer (sweet heat pepper jelly); and Alex a vegan college health counselor and author (avocado-based dip). Focus Group: party planners. Focus Group eliminates: Alex. Winner: Patricia.
6	"Sauces"	August 29, 2013	104	0.64
Competing in this episode are Jen from Nashville, TN who lost her business in the recession (versatile tomato-based red sauce), Avesta a single mom from Columbus, OH (mac n cheese sauce) and Christine, a pin-up model from Studio City, CA (jalapeño sauce). Focus group: culinary students. Winner: Jen.
7	"Snacks"	September 5, 2013	101	0.72
Competing in this episode are Tracey a chef from Atlanta, GA (snack plate of veggie crackers, herb chicken, roasted chick peas and chocolate dipped apricots), Nikki, who has a shop that sells crisped rice sweets (crisped rice sweet snack), and Ben, a movie grip from Los Angeles (dough wrapped fried chicken and gravy). Focus Group: college kids. Focus Group winner: Nikki. Focus Group eliminates: Tracey. Winner: Ben.
8	"Barbeque"	September 12, 2013	106	0.54
Competing in this episode are Adam, a debt collector from Wake Forest, NC, Xiomara, a widow with four kids from Temecula, CA and Torchy from Los Angeles. All three are presenting a barbecue sauce, although Xiomara has two versions. Focus Group: diehard football tailgaters. Focus Group winner: Adam. Focus Group sends home: Torchy. Winner: Xiomara.
9	"Dinner Entrees"	September 19, 2013	108	0.82
Competing in this episode are Monica from Spotsylvania, VA who has a 150-year-old recipe once served at her family's restaurant (crab pie), Heather, a fitness instructor and single mom from San Antonio, TX (whole wheat noodle bowl with vegetables and beef), and Carlos, a food truck operator from Freehold, NJ (beef empanada). Focus Group: working parents. Focus Group winner: Carlos. Focus Group eliminates: Heather. Winner: Carlos.
10	"The Finale"	September 26, 2013	110	N/A
Each of the mentors names two winners they are considering as their selection for the finale. For Fields it is Jen and Carlos. For Chiarello it is Latrice and Dominic. And for Cornyn it is Tekisha and Hannah. They end up choosing Jen, Dominic and Tekisha. The finalists present samples of their product at an A&P supermarket, where their product can also be purchased. Customers also fill out a survey form on the products. Jen is eliminated after having the lowest sales. The two remaining contestants then prepare a variation on their recipe (Tekisha does a chocolate version and Dominic a pork version) as a potential follow-on product. They present their products to A&P CEO Sam Martin, as well as Tom Dahlen. Dahlen and Martin pick Tekisha's frozen cheesecake cookie sandwich – the Smoogy – as the show winner and it is announced that it is now available in select A&P stores.

== Reception ==
David Hinckley gave the show two stars out of five, calling the mentors' advice instructive but wondering if most viewers would come away wondering if a slice of Sean's cake would cause their guests to put lampshades on their heads. In a Media Life Magazine review, Tom Conroy wrote after its premiere that the show was "worth a taste" and called the mentors' comments insightful. He disliked the amount of detail about the contestants' personal lives and found the series' title misleading, conjuring up an image of shoppers stuffing supermarket baskets.

Gwen Ihnat of the A.V. Club graded Supermarket Superstar C+ after the first episode, writing that it would have been interesting to discuss only two of the four issues in the test kitchen (nutrition and shelf life) and wishing that the supermarket buyer would explain what makes a consumer choose one product over another. According to Ihnat, there were too many reality-show cliches such as "This is my only shot".
