= Michael Schlow =

American restaurateur (born c. 1964)

Michael Schlow (born c. 1964, Brooklyn) is an American chef and restaurateur. Partnered with restaurateur Christopher Myers, the pair launched Boston restaurants Radius, Via Matta, and Tico. He was a master contestant on the first episode of Top Chef Masters. In 2018, his roster of restaurants was reported as 12 establishments, largely located Boston and Washington, D.C.

== Life ==
Schlow was born in Brooklyn, then was raised in Somerville, New Jersey, where he graduated from high school. His parents are Ned and Judy Cohn. He gave up a baseball scholarship to attend the Academy of Culinary Arts at Atlantic Cape Community College in New Jersey.

In 2012 he married Andover restaurateur Adrienne Pappadopoulos in May 2012.

== Career ==
Schlow began his career in New York City, and then Long Island, before moving to Boston. He relocated to Boston in 1995 to re-open Boston restaurateur Christopher Myers' Café Louis. Three years later, he and Myers opened Radius, followed by Via Matta, then Tico, now defunct. After 13 years, Schlow replaced Via Matta with the Doretta Taverna and Raw Bar. He has also helmed six Washington, DC-area restaurants, now defunct.

Schlow has appeared as a guest on The Tonight Show with Jimmy Fallon, Good Morning America, Today, CBS This Morning, Nightline, the Rachael Ray Show, and Food Network.

He opened Pine at the Hanover Inn, overlooking the Dartmouth College Green, in New Hampshire, in 2013. In Washington, DC, Schlow opened a second Tico's in 2014, launched The Riggsby at the Carlyle Hotel, in 2015, then Alta Strada trattoria, in March 2016, and So Casolare Italian restaurant, that May, at the Glover Park Hotel. By 2019, Schlow had opened a second Alta Strada and the Nama sushi restaurant in DC.

In partnership with Clint Mansour and hotelier Kenny Koza; Schlow opened Japanese-inspired Adachi restaurant at the Ford-Peabody Mansion in the Detroit suburb of Birmingham, in August 2018. He launched Pan-Asian family restaurant Zao Jun, in neighboring Bloomfield, in May 2019. That year, Schlow also opened his first fast-casual Italian eatery, Prima, in Bethseda, Maryland.

In 2024, he opened Seamark Seafood & Cocktails at the Encore Boston Harbor with partner, Sean Christie's Las Vegas-based Carver Road Hospitality. Schlow departed the restaurant in August of 2025, and in February of the following year employees voted to unionize.

In early 2026, he committed to opening a new restaurant at the Royal Sonesta Washington DC Dupont Circle hotel.

== Bibliography ==
- It’s About Time, Great Recipes for Everyday Life (2005)

== Awards and honors ==
- James Beard Foundation Award, Best Chef, Northeast, 2000
- Radius was named “Best New Restaurant” by Food & Wine
- Radius ranked “Best Restaurant” and “Best Power Lunch” by Boston Magazine
- Radius named one of the “25 Best American Restaurants” by Gourmet
- Via Matta was named one of the “Best New Restaurants in America by Gourmet and Esquire magazines
- Great Bay opened in 2003 and that same year was voted “Best Seafood Restaurant in Boston” by Boston Magazine, with co-owner Schlow as executive chef
