= Pizzeria Mozza =

Restaurant in Los Angeles, California, U.S.

- Interactive map of Pizzeria Mozza

Restaurant information
- Established: 2006
- Food type: Italian
- Location: 641 N. Highland Ave., Los Angeles, California, 90036, United States
- Coordinates: 34°04′59″N 118°20′20″W

Pizzeria Mozza is a pizzeria in Los Angeles, California. The restaurant opened in 2006. Owners have included Mario Batali, Joe Bastianich, and Nancy Silverton.

== See also ==
- Osteria Mozza
