= Michael Chiarello =

American chef (1962–2023)

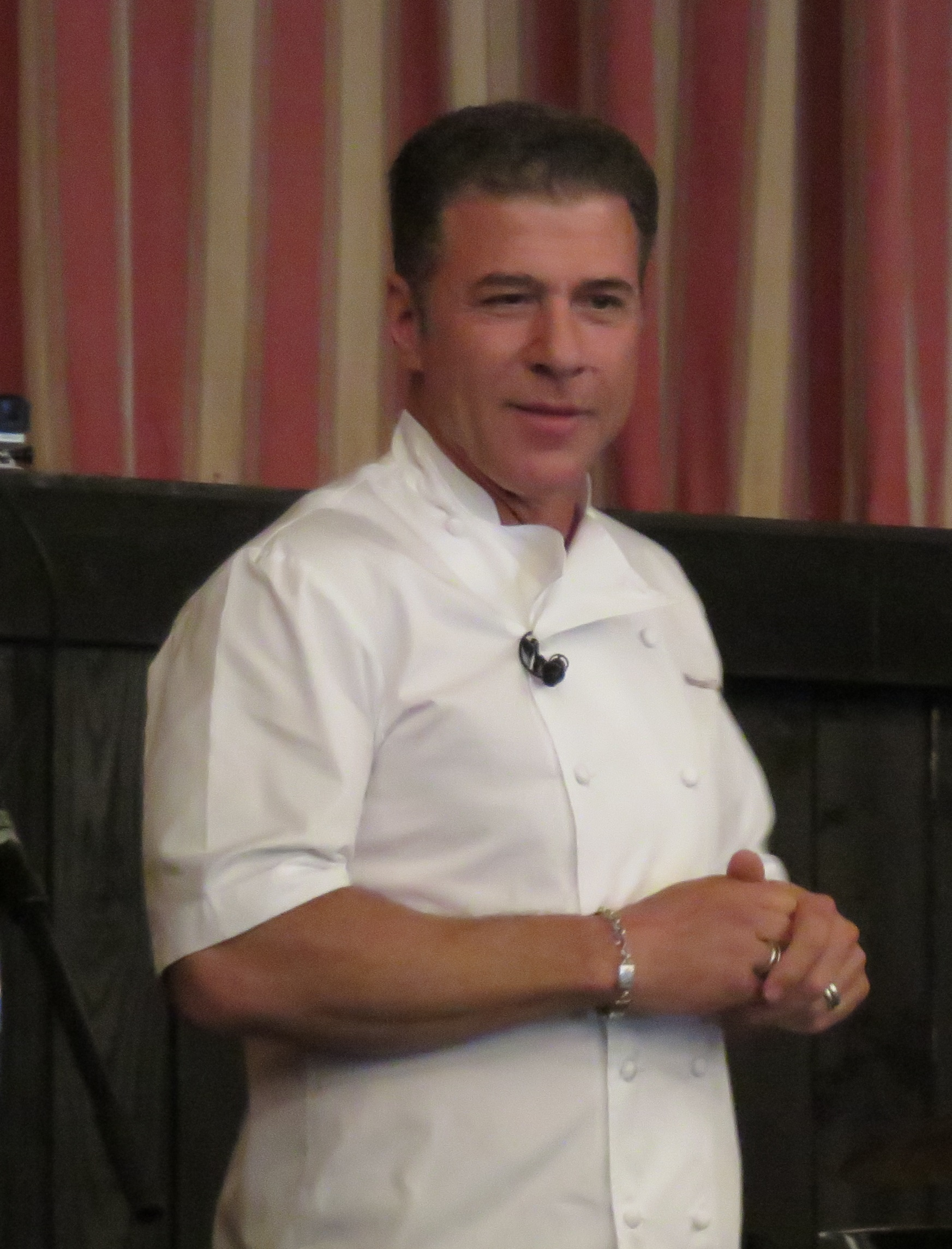
- Chiarello in 2015
- Born: January 26, 1962; Red Bluff, California, U.S.
- Died: October 6, 2023 (aged 61); Napa, California, U.S.
- Education: Florida International University, Culinary Institute of America
- Spouse(s): Ines Bartel (divorced), Eileen Marie Gordon (m. 2003–2019; separated)
- Children: 4
- Culinary career
- Cooking style: Californian, Italian
- Previous restaurants: Coqueta, San Francisco, California (2013–?); Coqueta, Yountville, California; Bottega Restaurant, Yountville, California (2008–20??); Ottimo; Tra Vigne, St. Helena, California (1987–2001)
- Television shows: NapaStyle (2004); Supermarket Superstar (2013)
- Award won: Daytime Emmy Award (2003)
- Website: http://michaelchiarello.com/

Michael Dominic Chiarello (January 26, 1962 – October 6, 2023) was an American celebrity chef, restaurateur, and businessperson, who was known for Italian-influenced California cuisine. He hosted the cooking TV shows Easy Entertaining with Michael Chiarello on Food Network and NapaStyle on Fine Living Network. He was the owner of a tapas restaurant named Coqueta and an Italian restaurant named Bottega and has locations in Napa Valley, California and San Francisco, California. He was a competitor on the fourth season of The Next Iron Chef.

== Early life and career ==
Michael Dominic Chiarello was born on January 26, 1962, in Red Bluff, California, to an Italian-American family. He began cooking with his family at a young age.

After graduating in 1982 from the Culinary Institute of America in Hyde Park, New York, he studied hospitality management at Florida International University, and received his bachelor's degree in 1984.

== Career ==
The next year, he opened the Grand Bay Hotel in Coconut Grove, Florida, and Toby's Bar and Grill. He was honored as 1985's Chef of the Year by Food & Wine Magazine. Later in the 1980s, Chiarello moved back to his home state of California, making his home in the Napa Valley. One of his first endeavors was to be a chef at The Heritage Restaurant in Turlock, which failed and went bankrupt.

He opened the Tra Vigne restaurant in 1987, creating a menu influenced by the cuisine of his family's native Calabria and rife with local seasonal ingredients. He remained at Tra Vigne until 2001.

He has since served as executive chef in numerous American restaurants, including Caffe Museo in San Francisco; Ajax Tavern and Bump's in Aspen, Colorado; and Bistecca Italian Steakhouse in Scottsdale, Arizona.

In the 1990s, Chiarello launched a line of flavored oils named Consorzio. Chiarello owned a winery called Chiarello Family Vineyards, located in Yountville, California. Chiarello also owned NapaStyle in Yountville, California, which sold a selection of exclusive drinkware, serverware, and designer tabletop pieces, which closed on January 4, 2016.

== Media career ==
His first cooking show, Season by Season, debuted on PBS in 2001. He hosted two more series for PBS, Michael Chiarello's Napa and Michael Chiarello's Napa: Casual Cooking, over the next two years before moving to the Food Network to host Easy Entertaining in 2003, which won an Emmy.

In 2004, his show NapaStyle premiered on the Food Network's sister network Fine Living Network.

In 2009, Chiarello was a contestant on Top Chef Masters, winning his preliminary round and advancing to the championship round, placing second to winner Rick Bayless.

In 2011, Chiarello appeared in the Visit California promotional film aimed at boosting tourism from the UK.

== Sexual harassment allegations ==
In March 2016, two former employees of Coqueta filed two lawsuits against Chiarello and his restaurant group Gruppo Chiarello, alleging sexual harassment and labor law violations. In 2017, the sexual harassment lawsuit was settled for an undisclosed amount.

== Personal life ==
His first marriage to Ines Bartel ended in divorce. He had three daughters from the first marriage, Margaux, Felicia and Giana. In 2003, Chiarello married Eileen Marie Gordon, with whom he had one son, Aidan, born in 2005. In 2019, Chiarello filed for divorce from Gordon; however, the paperwork was not finalized at the time of his death in 2023.

== Death ==
Chiarello died on October 6, 2023 in Napa, at the age of 61, after being hospitalized for an allergic reaction that led to anaphylaxis.

== Cookbooks ==
- Chiarello, Michael (1996). Michael Chiarello's Flavored Oils and Vinegars: 100 Recipes for Cooking with Infused Oils and Vinegars. Chronicle Book. ISBN 9780811808729.
- Chiarello, Michael (1999). The Tra Vigne Cookbook: Seasons in the California Wine Country. Chronicle Books.
- Chiarello, Michael (2001). Napa Stories Wine Journal. Stewart, Tabori & Chang. ISBN 9781584791317.
- Chiarello, Michael; Fletcher, Janet (2001). Napa Stories: Profiles, Reflections, and Recipes from the Napa Valley. Harry N. Abrams. ISBN 9781584791164.
- Chiarello, Michael; Fletcher, Janet (2002). Michael Chiarello's Casual Cooking: Wine Country Recipes for Family and Friends. Chronicle Books. ISBN 9780811833837.
- Chiarello, Michael (2005). At Home with Michael Chiarello: Easy Entertaining Recipes, Ideas, Inspiration. Chronicle Books. ISBN 9780811840484.
- Chiarello, Michael (2010). Bottega: Bold Italian Flavors from the Heart of California's Wine Country. Chronicle Books.
- Chiarello, Michael; Sansone, Claudia; Krueger Spivack, Ann (2013). Michael Chiarello's Live Fire: 125 Recipes for Cooking Outdoors. Chronicle Books. ISBN 9781452127347.

== Filmography ==
=== TV series ===
- 2000, Season by Season, PBS
- 2001, Michael Chiarello's Napa, PBS
- 2002, Michael Chiarello's Napa: Casual Cooking, PBS
- 2003, Easy Entertaining with Michael Chiarello (10 seasons)
- 2004, NapaStyle
- 2009, Top Chef Masters; lost to Rick Bayless
- 2011, The Next Iron Chef; lost to Geoffrey Zakarian
- 2013, Supermarket Superstar
