= Alban Vineyards =

- Location: Edna Valley, USA
- Coordinates: 35°11′04.6″N 120°33′12.3″W
- Appellation: Edna Valley AVA
- Founded: 1989
- Key people: John Alban, winemaker
- Cases/yr: 5,000
- Known for: Lorraine Vineyard; Reva Vineyard Syrah; Seymour's Vineyard Syrah; Pandora
- Varietals: Syrah, Grenache, Roussanne, Viognier, Mourvèdre
- Other products: dessert wine
- Distribution: limited
- Website: www.albanvineyards.com

Alban Vineyards is a California wine estate producing various Rhône style blends and varietal wines. The winery is located in Edna Valley, near Arroyo Grande in the southern corner of San Luis Obispo County.

== History ==
John Alban attended Vassar College and graduated in 1983 and completed his Master's Degree in oenology at UC Davis. He apprenticed in France and was trained by Jacques Raynaud of Château Rayas.

Starting in 1985, John Alban planted grapes for other people until he bought an estate in 1989. With a focus on creating wines made from Rhône Valley varietals, Alban came to be a pioneer of the Rhone Rangers movement, and is considered one of the most influential American Rhone producers.

On beginning to grow Viognier, Alban stated "I almost single-handedly doubled the world's acreage," referring to a time when its cultivation was reduced to 50 acres (20 ha) in two areas of the Rhône Valley, Condrieu and Château-Grillet. Alban's work, along with that of Josh Jensen of Calera Wine Company in San Benito County, helped to significantly expand plantings of Viognier in California at a time when the variety was near extinction.

== Production ==
Within a 250-acre (100 ha) area, the vineyard area extends 60 acres (24 ha), planted with varieties Syrah, Viognier and Roussanne. Among the wines produced are the Lorraine Vineyard, Reva Vineyard Syrah, Seymour's Vineyard Syrah, and Pandora, a blend of Grenache and Syrah. There has also been produced a dessert wine with ca. 5% botrytis grapes and aged in 50% new oak, named Rotten Luck.
