= Barbuto (restaurant) =

Restaurant in New York City, U.S.

- Interactive map of Barbuto

Restaurant information
- Established: 2004
- Owner: Jonathan Waxman
- Food type: Italian
- Location: 113 Horatio Street, Manhattan, New York, New York, 10014
- Coordinates: 40°44′20″N 74°0′33.5″W
- Website: www.barbutonyc.com

Barbuto is an Italian restaurant owned by Jonathan Waxman located in the West Village of Manhattan, New York City, on Washington Street. The original location closed after 15 years when it lost its lease in 2019. They reopened in the autumn of 2021 at 113 Horatio Street. The new location actually opened in February 2020 but three weeks later they were forced to shut down due to the COVID-19 pandemic.

The restaurant originally opened in February 2004 and their signature dish is roast chicken with salsa verde.

== Awards and honors ==
Waxman won a James Beard Award for Best Chef NYC in 2016 based on his work at Barbuto.

New York Magazine has called it a “pioneering farm-to-table-y Italian restaurant.“
