= Manfred Krankl =

Manfred Krankl is an Austrian-born winemaker and the founder, alongside his wife Elaine, of the California winery Sine Qua Non. Established in 1993, the winery is renowned for its limited-production wines crafted from blends of Rhône grape varieties. Sine Qua Non is characterized by its innovative, non-repetitive wine styles and its status as a highly sought-after "cult" wine producer due to the extreme difficulty in obtaining its bottles. Krankl moved to the United States in 1980 prior to starting his winery.

== See also ==
- Rhone Rangers
