= La Brea Bakery =

Bakery company based in Los Angeles, US

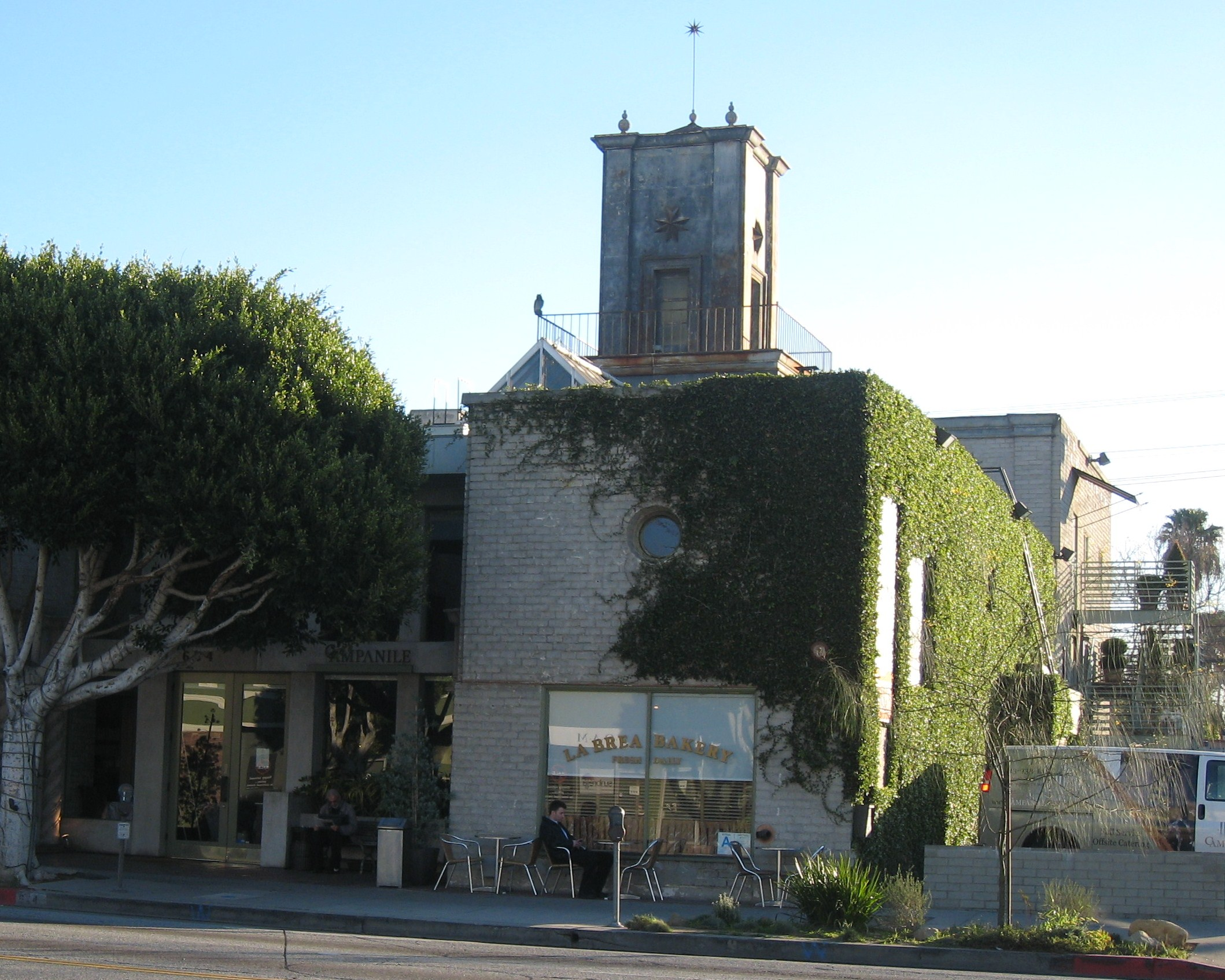
- The original La Brea Bakery location in Los Angeles, which closed in 2012
- Founded: Los Angeles, California; January 1989; 37 years ago
- Founders: Nancy Silverton and Mark Peel
- Owner: Aspire Bakeries
- Website: labreabakery.com

La Brea Bakery is an industrial baking company started in Los Angeles, California. Since opening its flagship store on 624 S La Brea Avenue in 1989—six months earlier than Campanile, the restaurant it was built to serve—La Brea has opened two much larger bakeries in Van Nuys, California, and Swedesboro, New Jersey, to serve wholesale clients. La Brea Bakery is one of the largest sellers of artisan bread in the US. In 2001, La Brea was acquired by Aryzta AG. In 2021, Aryzta sold its interest in La Brea Bakery and its other North American brands (Aryzta North America) to Lindsay Goldberg. In May 2021, Aryzta North America was renamed to Aspire Bakeries.

== History ==
Founders Nancy Silverton and Mark Peel had originally wanted to open a restaurant that offered fresh-baked bread. At the time, Silverton was working at Wolfgang Puck's Spago. However, she found that "unless you were really set up for it, it wasn't very profitable to make your own bread. You need to have a dedicated space and you need to do wholesale to make money at it." Originally just a small storefront, in 1998 the business raised US$10 million for a new production plant in Van Nuys and became the largest artisanal bakery in the United States. The facility prepares par-baked bread, dough that has been 80% baked and then quick-frozen for baking later. La Brea breads are widely available throughout Southern California and are sold in many supermarkets.

In October 2008, La Brea Bakery was chosen to open a new restaurant at Los Angeles International Airport.

In November 2012, the Campanile Restaurant and the adjoining original flagship La Brea Bakery retail store closed. In January 2013, a new La Brea Bakery and Cafe opened one block away, in a converted florist's shop.

In 2014, for the company's 25th anniversary, the logo and packaging was redesigned. The burgundy logo with a capital "B" was replaced by a lowercase "b" on a bright red background. The flagship location also underwent a design renovation.

In January 2023, La Brea Bakery announced it would close its retail bakery locations in Downtown Disney and the original bakery located on La Brea Ave.

== See also ==
- History of California bread
