= Mark Peel (chef) =

American chef (1954–2021)

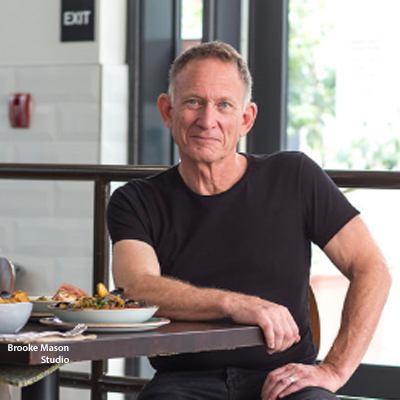
- Born: November 19, 1954; Los Angeles, California
- Died: June 20, 2021 (aged 66); Los Angeles, California
- Education: B.S., Hotel and Restaurant Management, Cal Poly Pomona
- Notable work: New Classic Family Dinners; The Food of Campanile: Recipes from the Famed Los Angeles Restaurant (with Nancy Silverton); Mark Peel & Nancy Silverton at Home: Two Chefs Cook for Family & Friends; The Gamble House Cookbook
- Spouses: Reine River (m. 1979; div. 1982) Nancy Silverton (m. 1984; div. 2004) Daphne Brogdon (m. 2005)
- Children: 5
- Culinary career
- Cooking style: California
- Previous restaurants: Prawn Coastal; Campanile; The Tar Pit; La Brea Bakery
- Awards won: Outstanding Restaurant, James Beard Foundation (2001); Chef of the Year, California Restaurant Association (2001); Best New Chefs, Food & Wine Magazine (1990)
- Website: chefmarkpeel.com

Mark Peel (November 19, 1954 – June 20, 2021) was an American chef and restaurateur in California. Campanile, a restaurant owned by Peel and his former wife Nancy Silverton, won a James Beard Foundation Award in 2001. Peel specialized in California cuisine and was a pioneer of the farm-to-table concept.

== Career ==
In October 1975, Peel began as an apprentice under Wolfgang Puck at Ma Maison. In 1978, Peel did an estage stint in France at La Tour d'Argent, Potel et Chabot, and Moulin de Mougins. When Michael's opened in 1979 in Santa Monica, he became sous chef, first under Ken Frank and then under Jonathan Waxman. In 1980, Peel moved to Alice Waters' Chez Panisse to make pastries, then assumed the role of chef de cuisine at the original Spago in 1981.

In 1989, Peel co-founded Los Angeles’ Campanile restaurant with Nancy Silverton, his wife at that time. "The storied restaurant, with its distinctly American approach using top-quality farmers' market ingredients, helped set the tone for Los Angeles dining in the 1990s," wrote Betty Hallock. For more than two decades Peel served as Executive Chef at Campanile, where food critic Jonathan Gold observed that "... Peel is still the most exacting grill chef in the country, a master who plays his smoldering logs the way that Pinchas Zukerman does a Stradivarius." Campanile closed in 2012. To provide the breads they needed, Peel and Silverton also co-founded La Brea Bakery, which opened five months before Campanile restaurant launched. La Brea Bakery was sold in 2001 and is now a worldwide company. Peel's Tar Pit, a cocktail lounge, and Point, a deli, also closed in 2012.

The Los Angeles Times said, “For more than 20 years, Campanile has played an important role in shaping the cuisine of Southern California and beyond, not just through its menu but also through the many graduates of its kitchen.” Several of his mentees went on to create restaurants of their own.

Peel authored three cookbooks (two with ex-wife Nancy Silverton). His cookbook, New Classic Family Dinners, written with Martha Rose Shulman was selected as one of the Top Ten Cookbooks of 2009 by Amazon and one of the Top 25 Cookbooks of 2009 by Food & Wine. Though Peel was known for his Mediterranean fare, the book is a collection of his favorite traditional American cuisine recipes.

Peel appeared twice as a contestant on Top Chef Masters, twice as a judge on Top Chef in 2009 and 2010, and on several iterations of Hell's Kitchen, Knife Fight, and Kitchen Nightmares. On occasion, he joined programs on the Food Network, Hallmark Channel, and other television outlets to demonstrate food preparation.

Peel's most recent venture was Prawn Coastal, a casual broth-based seafood concept located in Grand Central Market in Los Angeles. Prawn Coastal was initially launched as Bomba in 2015, and was re-branded in 2017. Prawn closed in March 2022.

In 2013, Peel was profiled in a New York Times article about the long-term effects of being a chef. His long career as a chef had taken a significant physical toll. The article states “Those 41 years in the kitchen have brought him considerable fame: Campanile won the James Beard award as outstanding restaurant in the United States in 2001. They have also brought him carpal tunnel syndrome in both wrists and thoracic outlet syndrome in his shoulders, resulting from repetitive stirring, fine knife movements and heavy lifting.”

== Philanthropy ==
While at Spago, Peel helped to organize the first three Food & Wine Festival fundraisers for St Vincent's Meals on Wheels and continued to be a consistent supporter of St. Vincent's efforts. During the Writer's Strike in late 2007 to early 2008, Peel created a “Writer’s Soup Kitchen” every Wednesday at Campanile to offer discounted meals to his customers who were affected by the strike.

Peel's community involvement also included active fundraising for culinary scholarships, for schools in Los Angeles and for political campaigns. His service to the community was recognized by the Los Angeles Police Department.

== Awards and honors ==
Campanile Restaurant and Peel have received numerous awards, including:

- The "Los Angeles Culinary Master of the Year"
- 2012 Honored by the Los Angeles City Council for contributions to the LA food scene and charitable work.
- 2005 California Restaurant Association, Chef of the Year
- 2004 International Star Diamond Award for Outstanding Hospitality
- 2001 The James Beard Foundation Outstanding Restaurant Award
- 1997 DiRoNA, Distinguished Restaurant of North America
- 1996 Nation's Restaurant News Fine Dining Award
- 1995 Southern California Restaurant Writers, Restaurateur of the Year & Restaurant of the Year
- 1990 Food & Wine, Best New Chefs

== Personal life ==
Peel was born in Los Angeles on November 19, 1954. From 1979 to 1982, Peel was married to the artist Reine River. From 1984 to 2004 Peel was married to Nancy Silverton, with whom he had three children. Peel married comedian Daphne Brogdon in 2005. They separated in 2019 but remained married until his death. They had two children.

Peel lost money in the Madoff investment scandal through Stanley Chais, who collected "feeder funds" for Bernie Madoff.

Peel died at the age of 66 on June 20, 2021, in Los Angeles, nine days after having been diagnosed with an aggressive form of germ cell cancer.

== See also ==
- List of American restaurateurs
- American cuisine
- California cuisine
