= Jonathan Waxman =

American chef (born 1950)

- Born: 1950 (age 75–76)
- Education: University of Nevada, Reno
- Culinary career
- Cooking style: California; Italian
- Current restaurant(s): Barbuto Jams Restaurant Brezza Cucina Adele's Waxman's
- Television shows: MasterChef; Guy's Grocery Games

Jonathan Waxman (born 1950) is an American chef. He is credited with being one of the first chefs to bring the California cuisine movement to New York, fusing techniques from French cuisine with local ingredients.

== Biography ==
Born in 1950, Waxman grew up near Berkeley, California. After graduating from the University of Nevada, Reno, he found work playing in bands at casinos and later with a rock band named "Lynx".

Waxman eventually gave up his career as a trombonist to study at La Varenne cooking school in France. In 1979, he and restaurateur Michael McCarty opened Michael's Restaurant in an old mansion near the Santa Monica beach; the groundbreaking cuisine attracted diners from all over America. Five years later, he opened Jams Restaurant on East 79th Street in New York; the chance to dine with what New York magazine called "an elder statesman of the new California cooking" made Jams the most sought after dining sensation of the season. His work at Jams made him a celebrity chef; "whoever said chefs in the 80's were like rock-and-roll stars", said one reviewer, "had Jonathan in mind." Among other restaurants created by Waxman are Bud's, Hulot's, Jams of London, and Table 29. He was named in Esquire magazine's list of most influential Americans.

As of 2025, Waxman is the chef-owner of Barbuto, a casual, rustic Italian restaurant in New York City's West Village; Jams in New York City's Midtown; and Park Tavern restaurant in San Francisco. He has previously opened Brezza Cucina in Atlanta's Ponce City Market, Adele's in Nashville, and Waxman's at Ghirardelli Square in San Francisco. According to New York Magazine, Barbuto's food is "rustic Italian," and the mood is "casually hip." His cookbook published by Simon & Schuster was released in 2011.

In 2018, Waxman served as a guest judge on season nine of MasterChef, and was introduced as the mentor of Aarón Sanchez. In 2021, he again appeared as a guest judge for the show on season eleven.

== Top Chef: Masters ==
In 2010, Waxman was a contestant on Bravo's Top Chef: Masters. He was eliminated in the penultimate episode, placing fourth out of eighteen competitors. James Oseland, one of the main judges for season two of Top Chef: Masters, has been quoted as saying, "I think he is one of the country's greatest chefs."

== Personal life ==
Waxman lives in Manhattan with his wife Sally and three children.
