= California cuisine =

Food from the US state

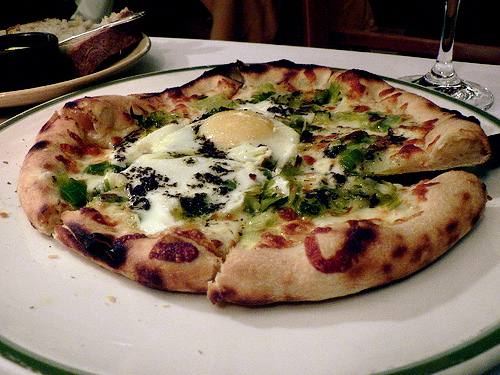
California-style pizza at Chez Panisse in Berkeley

California cuisine is a food movement that originated in Northern California, in the United States. The cuisine focuses on dishes that use local and sustainable ingredients, with attention to seasonality.

The food is historically chef-driven; Alice Waters's restaurant Chez Panisse is an iconic example. Dishes and meals low in saturated fats and high in fresh vegetables and fruits with lean meats and seafood from the California coast often define the style.

The term "California cuisine" arose as a result of culinary movements in the last decades of the 20th century and is not to be confused with the traditional foods of California. California fusion cuisine has been influenced by French, American, Italian, Mexican, and Chinese culinary styles, among other food cultures.

== History ==
One of the first proponents of using fresh, locally available foods was Helen Evans Brown, who published Helen Brown's West Coast Cookbook in 1952. She advocated using fruits and spices available in one's neighborhood, forgoing poor grocery store substitutes, as well as fresh seafood, caught locally. The book received wide acclaim and became the "template" for what is now thought of as California cuisine.

Alice Waters, who opened the restaurant Chez Panisse in 1971 in Berkeley, has contributed significantly to the concept of California cuisine.

At about the same time, in Yountville in the Napa Valley, Sally Schmitt began serving single-menu monthly dinners that emphasized local ingredients, continuing the concept when she and her husband Don opened the French Laundry in 1978.

In Los Angeles, Wolfgang Puck was also an early pioneer of California cuisine, starting with his work at Patrick Terrail's Ma Maison and later with Ed LaDou on California-style pizza at Spago and Asian fusion at Chinois on Main.

Mark Peel, who worked for both Waters and Puck, went on to co-found La Brea Bakery and Campanile Restaurant with his then-wife Nancy Silverton. As executive chef, he mentored other up-and-coming chefs.

Daniel Patterson, a modern proponent of the style, emphasizes vegetables and foraged foods while maintaining the traditional emphasis on local ingredients and presentation.

== See also ==
- New American cuisine
