= Spago =

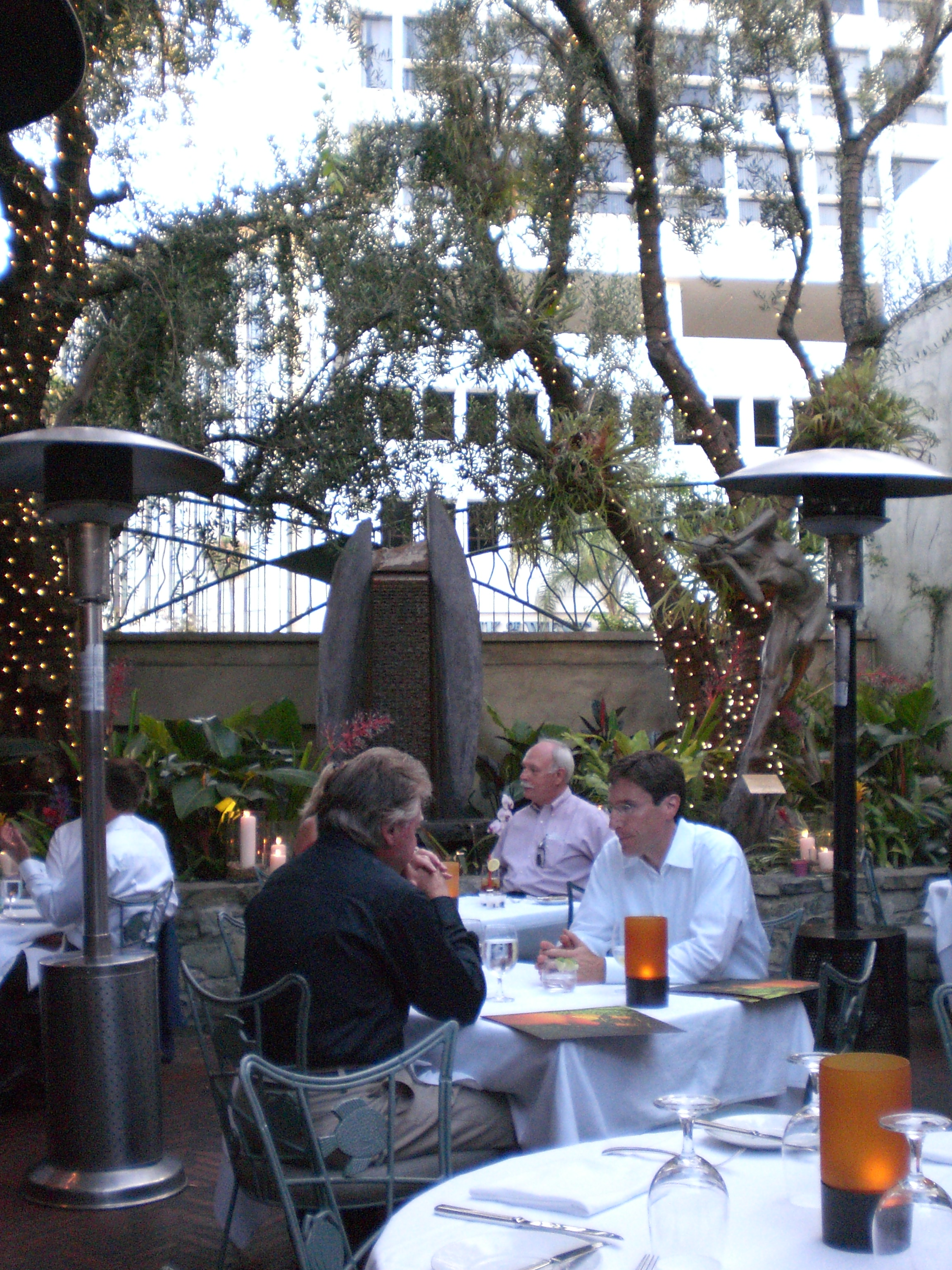
- Spago courtyard
- Interactive map of Spago

Restaurant information
- Established: 1982
- Owner: Wolfgang Puck
- Chef: Wolfgang Puck
- Food type: California
- Location: 176 N Canon Dr, Beverly Hills, California, U.S.
- Coordinates: 34°4′3.3″N 118°23′51.6″W
- Other locations: Las Vegas, Maui, Istanbul, Singapore
- Website: wolfgangpuck.com/restaurants/spago-beverly-hills/

Spago is Wolfgang Puck's flagship restaurant chain worldwide, known for serving California cuisine. Spago is Puck's first restaurant venture.

== Name and history ==
The word "spago" is Italian for "string" or "twine". The plural would be "spaghi," which is the beginning of "spaghetti", and suggests that pasta is on the menu.

The first Spago location opened in 1982, on the Sunset Strip in West Hollywood, California, with Mark Peel as chef de cuisine under Puck. The second Spago restaurant opened at The Forum Shops at Caesars Palace, on the Las Vegas Strip in 1992. It relocated to Bellagio Las Vegas in spring 2018. In 1997, Wolfgang Puck opened a third location on Canon Drive in Beverly Hills. In 1998, a Spago location opened in Palo Alto which was closed in 2007.

The original Spago Hollywood remained open until 2001 when Wolfgang Puck and his partners determined renovating the original 1920s-era house would be too costly. They let their lease on the location expire.

In 2001, a location was opened at the Four Seasons Resort Maui, in Hawaii. In 2007, a location opened at the Ritz-Carlton Bachelor Gulch, in Avon, Colorado (which closed in 2016).

Shaved black truffle atop pasta at Spago in Las Vegas, Nevada.

Spago opened its first location outside of the United States in Mexico City in the mid-1990s, which closed a few years later. It later opened a restaurant in Istanbul, Turkey, at the St. Regis Hotel in 2015. Other international locations include one in Singapore at the rooftop complex of Marina Bay Sands.

== Awards and honorable recognitions ==
- In 2008 and 2009, Spago was awarded two Michelin stars
- Since 2010, Spago has received the Wine Spectator Grand Award
- In 2013, Zagat named Spago the most iconic restaurant in the city of Los Angeles
