= Top Chef: Miami =

Season 3 of American television series

- Season 3
- Hosted by: Padma Lakshmi
- Judges: Tom Colicchio; Gail Simmons; Ted Allen
- No. of contestants: 15
- Winner: Hung Huynh
- Runners-up: Dale Levitski; Casey Thompson
- Location: Miami, Florida
- Finals venue: Aspen, Colorado
- Fan Favorite: Casey Thompson
- No. of episodes: 17

Release
- Original network: Bravo
- Original release: June 13 – October 10, 2007

Season chronology
- ← Previous; Los Angeles Next → Chicago

Top Chef: Miami is the third season of the American reality television series Top Chef. It was first filmed in Miami, Florida, before concluding in Aspen, Colorado. The season was Emmy nominated for Outstanding Reality Competition Series, and garnered the Emmy Award for Best Editing in the category. Season 3 premiered on June 13, 2007 and ended on October 10, 2007. Padma Lakshmi returned with Tom Colicchio, Gail Simmons, and new judge Ted Allen, who switched off with Simmons throughout the season. Top Chef: San Francisco contestant Lee Anne Wong was brought in as a food consultant and assisted in planning the challenges. Production took place in April and May 2007 in Miami Beach, Florida, with production activity centered at the Fontainebleau Hotel. The winning recipe from each week's episode of Season 3 was featured on Bravo's Top Chef website and prepared by Lee Anne Wong in a web series called The Wong Way to Cook. In the season finale, Hung Huynh was declared the winner over runners-up Dale Levitski and Casey Thompson. Thompson was voted Fan Favorite.

== Contestants ==
Fifteen chefs competed in Top Chef: Miami.

Name	Hometown	Current residence (Note: The contestants' city and state of residence during time of filming.)	Age
Lia Bardeen	Tacoma, Washington	Brooklyn, New York	28
Camille Becerra	Elizabeth, New Jersey	Brooklyn, New York	34
Sandee Birdsong	St. Simons Island, Georgia	Miami Beach, Florida	39
Clay Bowen	Columbus, Mississippi	Santa Barbara, California	28
Micah Edelstein	Bridgewater, Massachusetts	Boca Raton, Florida	33
Hung Huynh	Pittsfield, Massachusetts	Las Vegas, Nevada	29
Chris "CJ" Jacobson	El Toro, California	Venice, California	31
Howie Kleinberg	Miami, Florida		31
Dale Levitski	Chicago, Illinois		34
Sara Mair	Kingston, Jamaica	Miami, Florida	34
Brian Malarkey	Bend, Oregon	San Diego, California	34
Sara Nguyen	Santa Monica, California	Chicago, Illinois	25
Joey Paulino	Long Island, New York	New York, New York	29
Casey Thompson	Cedar Hill, Texas	Dallas, Texas	29
Tre Wilcox	Duncanville, Texas	Cedar Hill, Texas	30

Dale Levitski, Casey Thompson, and Tre Wilcox returned to compete in Top Chef: All-Stars. Chris "CJ" Jacobson returned for Top Chef: Seattle, and later competed in Top Chef Duels. Thompson returned again for Top Chef: Charleston. Brian Malarkey returned for Top Chef: All-Stars L.A. Sandee Birdsong became the supervisor for Top Chef's culinary production team from the seventh season onwards.

== Contestant progress ==
Episode #		1	2	3	4	5	7	8	9^{3}	10	11	12	13	14	15
Quickfire Challenge Winner(s)		Micah	Hung	Brian	Casey	Joey	Casey	Dale^{2}	CJ^{1}	Dale^{1} Howie^{1} Hung^{1} Sara M.^{1}	Brian^{1}	Hung^{1}	Hung^{1}	Casey^{1}	N/A
Contestant		Elimination Challenge results													
1	Hung	HIGH	IN	IN	HIGH	LOW	LOW	HIGH	IN	HIGH	LOW	HIGH	WIN	IN	WINNER
2	Dale	LOW	IN	HIGH	LOW	IN	HIGH	IN^{2}	IN	HIGH	LOW	HIGH	LOW	WIN	RUNNER-UP
2	Casey	IN	IN	IN	LOW	LOW	HIGH	LOW	IN	LOW	WIN	WIN	HIGH	IN	RUNNER-UP
4	Brian	LOW	WIN	LOW	HIGH	IN	IN	HIGH	IN	LOW	LOW	LOW	HIGH	OUT	
5	Sara M.	IN	IN	LOW	LOW	IN	LOW	HIGH	IN	WIN	HIGH	LOW	OUT		
6	CJ	IN	IN	LOW	IN	IN	WIN	LOW	IN	LOW	HIGH	OUT			
7	Howie	LOW	LOW	WIN	LOW	WIN	LOW	LOW	IN	HIGH	OUT				
8	Tre	WIN	LOW	IN	IN	IN	WIN	WIN	IN	OUT					
9	Sara N.	IN	HIGH	IN	IN	LOW	IN	OUT							
10	Joey	IN	LOW	IN	LOW	HIGH	OUT								
11	Lia	IN	IN	LOW	WIN	OUT									
12	Camille	IN	IN	IN	OUT										
13	Micah	IN	HIGH	OUT											
14	Sandee	IN	OUT												
15	Clay	OUT													

^Note 1: The chef(s) did not receive immunity for winning the Quickfire Challenge.
^Note 2: As a reward for winning the Quickfire Challenge, Dale was allowed to sit out the Elimination Challenge.
^Note 3: There were no eliminations in Episode 9.

(WINNER) The chef won the season and was crowned "Top Chef".
(RUNNER-UP) The chef was a runner-up for the season.
(WIN) The chef won the Elimination Challenge.
(HIGH) The chef was selected as one of the top entries in the Elimination Challenge, but did not win.
(IN) The chef was not selected as one of the top or bottom entries in the Elimination Challenge and was safe.
(LOW) The chef was selected as one of the bottom entries in the Elimination Challenge, but was not eliminated.
(OUT) The chef lost the Elimination Challenge.

== Episodes ==
No. overall	No. in season	Title	Original release date
26	0	"4-Star All-Stars"	June 6, 2007
On June 6, 2007, as part of the buildup for Season 3, Bravo aired a special charity episode called "4-Star All-Stars", which awarded $20,000 to the charity of the winning team's choice. The show brought together Season 1 contestants Harold Dieterle, Tiffani Faison, Dave Martin, and Stephen Asprinio, and Season 2 contestants Ilan Hall, Marcel Vigneron, Sam Talbot, and Elia Aboumrad. The show format was kept the same, starting with a Quickfire Challenge (cook 2 eggs in 10 minutes, with one hand behind their back) that determined the team captains, followed by an Elimination Challenge (produce a four course meal using scallops, lobster, duck & Kobe beef). The show was filmed in Miami, Florida, the setting for the upcoming season. The winning Season 1 competitors, captained by Stephen Asprinio, donated their winnings to Susan G. Komen for the Cure.
27	1	"First Impressions"	June 13, 2007
Quickfire Challenge: The chefs are surprised at their introductory party at Miami's Casa Casuarina, also known as the Versace Mansion. when they're required to create an amuse-bouche within 10 minutes, using only the existing appetizer food and primarily plastic utensils from the event. The winner received immunity from elimination.: Winner: Micah ("Tuscan Sushi Revisited": Italian Ham with Fig Jam, Prosciutto & Balsamic Dressing); Elimination Challenge: The chefs were asked to create a "surf and turf" dish in two hours using exotic proteins, such as ostrich, buffalo, abalone, alligator, snake, black chicken, geoduck, and eel. The winner received a collection of books by Anthony Bourdain.: Winner: Tre (Roasted Ostrich Filet with Heirloom Tomato Risotto & Abalone Reduction Sauce); Eliminated: Clay (Pan Seared Wild Boar Chop & Cornbread Dressing with Scorpion Fish)
28	2	"Sunny Delights"	June 20, 2007
Quickfire Challenge: The chefs created dishes featuring Florida citrus, including oranges, lemons, key limes, grapefruit, tangeloes, and blood oranges, with Florida fine dining pioneer and cookbook author chef Norman Van Aken as the guest judge. The winner received immunity from elimination.: Winner: Hung (Slow Roasted Sea Bass, Citrus Crumble Watercress & Radish Salad); Elimination Challenge: The chefs needed to create an upscale barbecue dish. They were given two hours to prep and two hours the following day to cook on a barbecue grill on location at a barbecue party.: Winner: Brian (Scallops, Shrimp & Seabass Sausage with Ginger Slaw & Chili Glaze); Eliminated: Sandee (Vanilla Poached Lobster, Pancetta Wrapped Date & Truffle Slaw)
29	3	"Family Favorites"	June 27, 2007
Quickfire Challenge: The chefs had to "catch and cook" a shellfish dish in 30 minutes after using nets to retrieve scallops, crawfish, and conch out of a fish tank. The winner received immunity from elimination.: Winner: Brian ("3 Rivers": Wine, Butter, Garlic, Chives with Clams, Scallops, Mussels & Crawfish; Oyster Mignonette); Elimination Challenge: The chefs were asked to update traditional "family favorites", such as tuna casserole, stuffed cabbage, and chicken and dumplings, by creating a healthier, more modern version with reduced cholesterol for members of an Elks club. The winner received three books from guest judge, chef Alfred Portale, and an invitation to spend a week at the Gotham Bar and Grill working with Portale and his staff.: Winner: Howie (Fennel Crusted Pork Chops with Three Apple Fennel Salad & Sultana Raisin Emulsion); Eliminated: Micah (Italian Style Meatloaf with Smashed Garlic Potato & Roasted Pepper Sauces)
30	4	"Cooking By Numbers"	July 11, 2007
Quickfire Challenge: The contestants were challenged to create an appetizer to pair with Bombay Sapphire mixed drinks; the specific drink was selected by random draw. The winner received immunity from elimination.: Winner: Casey (French Toast Baguette with Pecan Crusted Foie Gras, Raspberry Sauce & Strawberry Gin Rickey); Elimination Challenge: In teams of three, the contestants prepared a tasting menu of four courses, each consisting of trios around a central ingredient. The contestants divided themselves up into teams, and selected the main ingredient for each course and the order of the courses. The meal was served to the judges and members of Confrérie de la Chaîne des Rôtisseurs at Barton G. The Restaurant, owned by one of the diners, Barton G. Weiss.: First Course (Shrimp Trio): Hung, Brian, Lia; Second Course (Tuna Trio): Casey, Howie, Joey; Third Course (Beef Trio): CJ, Tre, Sara N.; Fourth Course (Pineapple Trio): Dale, Sara M., Camille; Winner: Lia (Olive Oil Poached Shrimp with Avocado, Cucumber, Lime & Grilled Pepper Salad); Eliminated: Camille (Pineapple Upside Down Cake with Ginger Sabayon)
31	5	"Latin Lunch"	July 18, 2007
Quickfire Challenge: The contestants were asked to create any dish starting with a pre-made pie crust, using additional ingredients from the Top Chef pantry. The winner received immunity from elimination.: Winner: Joey (Trio of Tarts: Berry Cream with Balsamic Vinegar, Roasted Mango Purée with Rum, Warm Apple Compote); Elimination Challenge: The contestants prepared a classical Latin lunch course to be served to the cast and crew of the Telemundo telenovela Dame Chocolate. They had $150 to spend on groceries and initially had three hours to prep. However, on the day of the lunch, the chefs were told that they only had 90 minutes to complete their meals and pack them for service. The winner received a bottle of Argentine wine from guest judge DUO restaurant co-owner Maria Frumkin.: Winner: Howie (Braised Pork Shoulder with Yucca Sour Orange Mojo); Eliminated: Lia (Smoked Rainbow Trout with Polenta Cake)
32	6	"Watch What Happens Special"	July 25, 2007
33	7	"Freezer Burn"	August 1, 2007
Quickfire Challenge: The contestants were challenged to the culinary equivalent of a spelling bee, and had to identify foods by either taste or appearance. The winner received immunity from elimination.: Winner: Casey; Elimination Challenge: The contestants were randomly paired up to create Bertolli-inspired Mediterranean entrées that would be frozen overnight. The food was served to shoppers the next day in the style of pre-packaged frozen dinners. They were given $100 to shop at Fresh Market to buy enough food to make 15 full courses and sampling dishes, two hours to prepare prior to freezing, and another hour after freezing before serving their meals. Each member of the winning team received two tickets to Italy. Rocco DiSpirito guest judges.: Team 1: Hung, Joey; Team 2: Howie, Sara M.; Team 3: Brian, Sara N.; Team 4: CJ, Tre; Team 5: Casey, Dale; Winners: Tre, CJ (Black Truffle & Parmesan Linguini, Kale, Tomato Confit & Grilled Chicken); Eliminated: Joey (Tri-Colored Fusilli with Garlic & Sun-Dried Tomato Sauce & Chicken)
34	8	"Guilty Pleasures"	August 8, 2007
Quickfire Challenge: The chefs were given 45 minutes to prepare ingredients to be mixed into Cold Stone Creamery ice cream just prior to serving. The winner received immunity from elimination and dined with restaurateur Govind Armstrong at Table 8.: Winner: Dale ( Flambéed Peaches with Candied Pecans and Cobbler Topping); Elimination Challenge: The chefs were initially told they had the night off to enjoy Miami nightlife. They discovered later that they would be cooking outdoors for patrons at the Nikki Beach night club. The eight chefs drew knives to divide into two teams of four, with Quickfire winner Dale getting the night off. Each team was given a catering truck to use as a mobile kitchen, 30 minutes and $300 to shop, and two hours to prepare a number of "late-night" bar food dishes. The winner received a first-edition copy of Armstrong's book and a platinum card good for entry into all Club Nikki locations.: Black Team: Brian, Hung, Sara M., Tre; Orange Team: Casey, CJ, Howie, Sara N.; Winner: Tre (Bacon Wrapped Shrimp, Cheese Grits with Tomato Chipotle Butter); Eliminated: Sara N. (Beef Sliders with Caramelized Onions & Plantain Chips)
35	9	"Restaurant Wars"	August 15, 2007
Quickfire Challenge: The chefs were given 30 minutes to prepare a burger, as inspired by Red Robin's line of "Adventuresome" Burgers. The winner received an advantage for the upcoming Elimination Challenge. From this point on, immunity was no longer awarded to the winner of a Quickfire Challenge.: Winner: CJ (Scallop Mousse & Shrimp Burger with Tangerine); Elimination Challenge: The chefs divided into two teams, and each one was responsible for taking an empty space and opening an operating restaurant out of it in 24 hours. The teams had $2,500 and 45 minutes to purchase décor items, and $500 and 30 minutes to shop for food items at The Fresh Market. Each restaurant was connected to the Top Chef kitchens; thus, teams shared the kitchen space. CJ, as the winner of the Quickfire, was able to select the members of his team. The teams were unaware prior to the challenge that Andrea Strong, author of the food blog "The Strong Buzz", would also be dining in each restaurant and commenting on décor, service, and food, with her comments partially influencing the judging decisions. Daniel Boulud guest judges.: Restaurant April: Brian (FOH), Casey, CJ, Tre (EC); Amuse-bouche: Bluepoint Oyster with Ginger & Watermelon Granita; First Course: Seared Sea Scallop on Corn & Black Truffle Custard; Second Course: Seared Grouper with Shellfish, Basil Pistou & Artichoke Hearts; Third Course: Wild Mushroom and Gorgonzola Crusted Beef Tenderloin on Smoked Fingerling Potatoes; Dessert: Mango Lemongrass & Sake Sorbet, Tarte Tatin with Brandy Sauce & Crème Anglaise; The Garage: Dale (FOH), Howie, Hung, Sara M. (EC); First Course: Tuna Tartare with Egg Vinaigrette, Niҫoise Olive Purée & Herb Salad; Second Course: Wild Mushroom Risotto with Foie Gras & Black Truffles; Third Course: Braised Lamb Shank with Sunchoke Potatoes & Baby Vegetables; Dessert: Sweet Crêpes with Dark Chocolate and Orange Grand Marnier Sauce; Winner: None (Note: No team won the Elimination Challenge, since the judges felt that both teams' respective successes in their restaurants were canceled out by the relative mis-steps. However, the judges decided not to send anyone home this round, opting for a redo of the challenge the next day, where someone would be eliminated afterwards.)
36	10	"Second Helping"	August 22, 2007
Quickfire Challenge: Continuing with the same teams from the previous week, both teams competed to be the first to complete four mise en place tasks in relay. The winning team received the help of Season 1 contestant and sommelier Stephen Asprinio for pairing wine with their courses during the Elimination Challenge, along with an extra $200 to spend on wine.: Restaurant April: Brian, Casey, CJ, Tre; The Garage: Dale, Howie, Hung, Sara M.; Winner: The Garage; Elimination Challenge: Each team reopened its restaurant, using input from the previous challenge, along with the assistance of Christopher Ciccone, who appeared as a diner in the previous episode, for interior decoration. The teams were allowed to change anything else they wanted with their restaurant, including its name. Each team prepared two different options for three of the four courses. They were given four hours of preparation time before both restaurants opened. Head judge Tom Colicchio was present in the kitchen during the preparation time and into the serving period. The winner received a fully stocked pantry from Town & Country. Geoffrey Zakarian guest judges.: Restaurant April: Brian (FOH), Casey, CJ, Tre (EC); First Course: Seared Sea Scallop on Corn & Black Truffle Custard; Wild King Salmon with Macadamia Nut Pesto & Grapefruit; Second Course: Chilled Carrot & Ginger Soup; Lobster Salad with Arugula & Caramelized Cauliflower; Third Course: Monkfish with Mascarpone Potatoes; Beef Tenderloin with Smoked Potatoes; Dessert: Apple & Brioche Bread Pudding with Cinnamon & Brandy Anglaise; Quatre: Dale (FOH), Howie, Hung, Sara M. (EC); First Course: Tuna Tartare with Egg Vinaigrette; Poussin with Mint Gnocchi, Sweet Pea Purée, Carrots & Hazelnuts; Second Course: Halibut with Grapes & Braised Leeks; Lamb with White Beans & Haricot Verts; Dessert: Panna Cotta with Fresh Berries; Crêpe with Orange & Grand Marnier Sauce; Winner: Sara M.; Eliminated: Tre
37	11	"Chef Overboard"	September 5, 2007
Quickfire Challenge: The chefs drew numbered knives corresponding to an aisle in a supermarket. Each chef had 20 minutes to create a dish using only $10 worth of products from that aisle, in addition to a limited selection of items from the Top Chef pantry. The winner received the ability to choose the team leader for the Elimination Challenge.: Winner: Brian (Canned Meat Aisle: Spam, Corned Beef Hash & Fried Egg with Onions & Balsamic Reduction); Elimination Challenge: Working as a team, the chefs catered a party for fashion designer Esteban Cortázar and 60 guests aboard the yacht Venetian Lady chartered by the Pure Nightclub. The entire team had a total of $350 to spend for supplies, and had two hours of preparation time on board the yacht prior to service. The winner received a 17-inch Apple MacBook Pro laptop computer. Dana Cowin and Michael Schwartz guest judge.: Winner: Casey (Beef Carpaccio with Watercress & Fried Caper, Shiitake Broth); Eliminated: Howie (Asparagus and Prosciutto "Cigars" with Parmesan Cheese)
38	12	"Snacks on a Plane"	September 12, 2007
Quickfire Challenge: The chefs were awakened in their penthouse by Padma Lakshmi and had 20 minutes to serve her breakfast using only a butane burner, a Breville blender, and a selection of ingredients brought over from the Top Chef pantry. The winner received an early copy of Lakshmi's new cookbook Tangy, Tart, Hot and Sweet and was first to choose a protein for the Elimination Challenge.: Winner: Hung (Steak & Eggs with Papaya; Banana & Grand Marnier Shake); Elimination Challenge: The contestants flew to Newark Liberty International Airport and, using the Continental Airlines kitchen at Newark Airport, prepared a meal for first class. The meal had to be reheated and served aboard a Boeing 777 in a hangar to 14 Continental flight attendants and the judges. The winner received two Continental business first class tickets to any Continental destination worldwide. Anthony Bourdain and Jimmy Canora guest judge.: Winner: Casey (Veal Medallions with Crimini & Apple Brandy, Cauliflower Gratin with Gruyère); Eliminated: CJ (Seared Halibut & Toasted Farro with Mint Oil; Roasted Broccolini with Breadcrumbs)
39	13	"Manhattan Project"	September 19, 2007
Quickfire Challenge: The chefs dined at Le Cirque on a classic dish of sea bass wrapped in thinly sliced Russet potatoes over leeks. They then had 25 minutes to recreate the dish as closely as possible to the original. This challenge was judged by Sirio Maccioni, owner of Le Cirque and the co-creator of the dish. The winner earned an extra 30 minutes of cooking time for the Elimination Challenge and the opportunity to serve the elimination judges first.: Winner: Hung; Elimination Challenge: At the French Culinary Institute, the chefs created dishes highlighting what are said to be the three hardest French cuisine ingredients to be creative with: onion, chicken, and potato. The chefs had a $200 budget to shop at the Union Square Greenmarket and two hours to cook (except Hung, who had an extra 30 minutes). The dishes were served to a panel of FCI deans consisting of André Soltner, Nils Norén, Jacques Torres, Alain Sailhac, Cesare Casella, and Dorothy Hamilton. The four dishes judged as the best would advance to the Top Chef finale in Aspen, Colorado.: Winner: Hung (Sous-Vide Chicken, Crisp Chicken Skin, Pommes Dauphine, Salad); Eliminated: Sara M. (Fricassee Chicken with Potato & Couscous Risotto, Confit of Onions)
40	14	"Finale, Part 1"	September 26, 2007
Quickfire Challenge: The chefs were each given a fresh trout from the Fryingpan River Valley area of Aspen, Colorado, along with a frying pan, camping stove, and several basic pantry ingredients. They then had 20 minutes to create an original dish to impress guest judge Eric Ripert, executive chef of Le Bernardin restaurant in New York City.: Winner: Casey (Trout Filet with Crisped Skin, Grapes, Tomatoes & Summer Corn); Elimination Challenge: At the Moon Run Ranch, the chefs catered the annual dinner for the Snowmass Rodeo Riders, using supplies already in place for the event's original caterers. Once the chefs arrived in the kitchens, the protein was revealed: elk. Each chef had three hours to create their own menu of dishes, and an hour for service. As the winner of the Quickfire Challenge, Casey was the only chef who would be able to use the items she brought from home in the Elimination Challenge. All others had to use what was provided.: Winner: Dale (Spiced Elk Loin, Huckleberry & Blackberry Sauce, Cauliflower & Fingerling Potatoes); Eliminated: Brian ( Whiskey-Braised Elk Shank, Potato Purée, Pancetta, Corn & Asparagus Relish)
41	15	"Finale, Part 2"	October 3, 2007
Elimination Challenge: The chefs took a ski lift to the Aspen Mountain Club, with an elevation of 11,200 feet. Their instructions for the final challenge were simple: "cook us the best meal you've ever cooked in your life." They were shown a large, diverse array of proteins and produce and were given 35 minutes to plan a three-course menu. Their final meal was served head-to-head rather than back-to-back; each chef's course was presented at the same time as their competitors. The chefs then drew knives to see which celebrity sous-chef they would be paired with for the three-hour prep period on the first day. Hung was paired with celebrity chef and author Rocco DiSpirito. Casey was paired with chef Michelle Bernstein. Dale was matched with chef and restaurateur Todd English. On the second day, the chefs were given two hours to complete their dishes before service. With an hour left, however, they were told that that had to add a fourth course to their menus. It could be composed of any ingredient available in the kitchen, and be served at any point in the meal. Eliminated contestants CJ, Howie, and Sara M. were randomly paired through knife drawing with Dale, Casey, and Hung, respectively, as sous-chefs to assist in the fourth course preparation. The four judges were joined at the dining table by the three celebrity sous-chefs and the most recently eliminated contestant, Brian. This episode marked the first, and only, time that the winner of Top Chef was announced live following the pre-taped portion of the show, at a live event in Chicago.: Casey: First Course: Cinnamon Scented Scallop with Celery & Foie Gras with Apple; Second Course: Poached Prawn with Rice Cake in Lobster Mushroom Broth; Third Course: Crispy Pork Belly over Pea Shoots with a Roasted Peach and Crème Fraîche; Fourth Course: Seared Sirloin with Potatoes, Mushrooms, Ruby Chard & Parsley Purée; Dale: First Course: Foie Gras Mousse with Peach Ras El Hanout Gastrique & Arugula; Second Course: Seared Scallop with Purslane Grapes & Sweet Corn; Third Course: Lobster, Corn, Mushrooms & Gnocchi in Curry Jus; Fourth Course: Poached Lamb with Eggplant Purée, Tomatoes & Squash; Hung: First Course: "Fish & Chips": Hamachi, Potatoes, Olive Oil & Tomato Vinaigrette; Second Course: Shrimp with Palm Sugar, Cucumber Salad & Coconut Foam; Third Course: Sous-Vide Duck with Mushroom Ragout & Truffle Sauce; Fourth Course: Molten Chocolate Cakes with Raspberry Coulis, Vanilla Creme Fraîche, & Nougatine Tuiles; Winner: Hung; Runners-up: Dale, Casey
42	16	"Reunion"	October 10, 2007
