= Top Chef: Chicago =

Season 4 of American television series

- Season 4
- Hosted by: Padma Lakshmi
- Judges: Tom Colicchio; Gail Simmons; Ted Allen
- No. of contestants: 16
- Winner: Stephanie Izard
- Runners-up: Lisa Fernandes; Richard Blais
- Location: Chicago, Illinois
- Finals venue: San Juan, Puerto Rico
- Fan Favorite: Stephanie Izard
- No. of episodes: 16

Release
- Original network: Bravo
- Original release: March 12 – June 18, 2008

Season chronology
- ← Previous; Miami Next → New York

Top Chef: Chicago is the fourth season of the American reality television series Top Chef. It was first filmed in Chicago, Illinois before concluding in San Juan, Puerto Rico. The season premiered on Bravo on March 12, 2008, and ended on June 18, 2008. In the season finale, Stephanie Izard was declared the winner over runners-up Lisa Fernandes and Richard Blais. Izard was also voted Fan Favorite.

== Contestants ==
Sixteen chefs competed in Top Chef: Chicago.

Name	Hometown	Current Residence (Note: The contestants' city and state of residence during time of filming.)	Age
Zoi Antonitsas	Seattle, Washington	San Francisco, California	30
Jennifer Biesty	Brooklyn, New York	San Francisco, California	35
Richard Blais	Uniondale, New York	Atlanta, Georgia	35
Valerie Bolon	Chicago, Illinois		32
Nikki Cascone	New York, New York		35
Andrew D'Ambrosi	Fort Lauderdale, Florida	New York, New York	30
Lisa Fernandes	Toronto, Ontario	New York, New York	27
Erik Hopfinger	Chappaqua, New York	San Francisco, California	38
Stephanie Izard	Stamford, Connecticut	Chicago, Illinois	31
Antonia Lofaso	Los Angeles, California		31
Spike Mendelsohn	Clearwater Beach, Florida	Washington, D.C.	27
Nimma Osman	Peachtree City, Georgia	Atlanta, Georgia	26
Mark Simmons	Invercargill, New Zealand	New York, New York	29
Ryan Scott	Los Banos, California	San Francisco, California	28
Dale Talde	Chicago, Illinois	New York, New York	29
Manuel Trevino	Laredo, Texas	New York, New York	33

Richard Blais, Antonia Lofaso, Spike Mendelsohn, and Dale Talde returned to compete in Top Chef: All-Stars. Blais, Lofaso, Talde and Stephanie Izard later competed in Top Chef Duels. Lisa Fernandes returned for Top Chef: All-Stars L.A.

== Contestant progress ==
Episode #		1^{2}	2	3	4	5	6	7	8	9	10	11	12	13	14
Quickfire Challenge Winner(s)		Richard^{2} Mark^{2} Jennifer^{2} Antonia^{2} Spike^{2} Dale^{2} Ryan^{2} Erik^{2}	Mark	Richard	Dale	Antonia	Jennifer	Richard	Antonia	Andrew^{1} Antonia^{1} Richard^{1} Stephanie^{1}	Spike^{1}	Antonia^{1}	Spike^{1}	Stephanie^{1}	N/A
Contestant		Elimination Challenge Results													
1	Stephanie	WIN	LOW	WIN	HIGH	HIGH	HIGH	LOW	LOW	WIN	HIGH	WIN	WIN	HIGH	WINNER
2	Lisa	IN	HIGH	IN	HIGH	WIN	IN	LOW	LOW	LOW	LOW	LOW	LOW	LOW	RUNNER-UP
2	Richard	HIGH	IN	IN	WIN	LOW	IN	WIN	IN	WIN^{3}	IN	HIGH	HIGH	WIN	RUNNER-UP
4	Antonia	HIGH	LOW	HIGH	LOW	LOW	HIGH	LOW	WIN	HIGH	IN	HIGH	HIGH	OUT	
5	Spike	IN	LOW	LOW	LOW	LOW	IN	HIGH	IN	LOW	LOW	LOW	OUT		
6	Dale	IN	LOW	LOW	HIGH	HIGH	WIN	WIN	IN	LOW	WIN	OUT			
7	Andrew	IN	WIN	LOW	HIGH	LOW	IN	HIGH	HIGH	HIGH	OUT				
8	Nikki	HIGH	LOW	IN	IN	IN	LOW	IN	HIGH	OUT					
9	Mark	LOW	HIGH	IN	IN	LOW	LOW	IN	OUT						
10	Jennifer	IN	HIGH	LOW	IN	IN	IN	OUT							
11	Ryan	LOW	IN	LOW	IN	IN	OUT								
12	Zoi	IN	HIGH	LOW	LOW	OUT									
13	Manuel	IN	HIGH	IN	OUT										
14	Erik	LOW	IN	OUT											
15	Valerie	IN	OUT												
16	Nimma	OUT													

^Note 1: The chef(s) did not receive immunity for winning the Quickfire Challenge.
^Note 2: Episode 1's Quickfire Challenge resulted in the 16 contestants being split into two groups of 8: the winners and losers. No immunity was given to the winners. This was done for the purpose of the head-to-head cook-off in the Elimination Challenge.
^Note 3: Richard was originally awarded the win by the judges. Although he gave the win to Stephanie, and she shared the prize, he is considered the sole winner of the challenge, according to the Bravo website.

(WINNER) The chef won the season and was crowned "Top Chef".
(RUNNER-UP) The chef was a runner-up for the season.
(WIN) The chef won the Elimination Challenge.
(HIGH) The chef was selected as one of the top entries in the Elimination Challenge but did not win.
(IN) The chef was not selected as one of the top or bottom entries in the Elimination Challenge and was safe.
(LOW) The chef was selected as one of the bottom entries in the Elimination Challenge but was not eliminated.
(OUT) The chef lost the Elimination Challenge.

== Episodes ==
No. overall	No. in season	Title	Original release date
43	0	"Top Chef Holiday Special"	December 6, 2007
On December 6, 2007, a special holiday-themed episode was aired, bringing selected chefs from the first three seasons back for a chance to win a prize of $20,000. Padma Lakshmi presided as host, with judges Ted Allen, Tom Colicchio, and Gail Simmons joined by guest judge Eric Ripert. The following chefs participated: Tiffani Faison and Stephen Asprinio (Season 1); Marcel Vigneron, Betty Fraser, and Josie Smith-Malave (Season 2); and Chris "CJ" Jacobsen, Tre Wilcox, and Sandee Birdsong (Season 3). The special was shot in Chicago, Illinois. The first 2 eliminated chefs were Sandee and Stephen. The second 2 eliminated chefs were Betty and Josie. The third 2 eliminated chefs were Marcel and CJ. In the end, Tiffani defeated Tre to receive the $20,000 prize, after cooking one final course to break the tie.
44	1	"Anything You Can Cook, I Can Cook Better"	March 12, 2008
Quickfire Challenge: The chefs had to create a signature deep dish pizza and serve it to Rocco DiSpirito and Padma Lakshmi. Immunity from elimination was not awarded to the winners. Instead, the teams were separated into two groups, based on their performances, for the upcoming Elimination Challenge.: Winners: Antonia, Dale, Erik, Jennifer, Mark, Richard, Ryan, Spike; Losers: Andrew, Lisa, Manuel, Nikki, Nimma, Stephanie, Valerie, Zoi; Elimination Challenge: The winners of the Quickfire cooked head-to-head against the losers, using one dish from a list of classic dishes. The winners drew numbered knives and chose one of the losers as their opponent. The opponent then selected which dish the pair would each prepare. Both dishes were served to the judges simultaneously, with decisions to follow immediately. Anthony Bourdain guest judges. The name of the winning chef for each dish is indicated below in italics.: Duck à l'orange: Mark vs. Stephanie; Crab Cakes: Richard vs. Andrew; Lasagna: Jennifer vs. Nikki; Shrimp Scampi: Antonia vs. Nimma; Eggs Benedict: Spike vs. Lisa; Steak au Poivre: Dale vs. Manuel; Chicken Piccata: Ryan vs. Valerie; Soufflé: Erik vs. Zoi; Winner: Stephanie (Duck Breast with Mushrooms, Bok Choy & Duck Spring Rolls with Orange-Soy Glaze); Eliminated: Nimma (Shrimp Scampi with Cauliflower Scramble)
45	2	"Zoo Food"	March 19, 2008
Quickfire Challenge: Each chef created a dish using no more than five ingredients (excluding pantry freebies salt, pepper, sugar, olive oil and canola oil), either purchased at Chicago's Green City Market or drawn from the Top Chef pantry; they had 30 minutes cooking time. The winner received immunity from elimination.: Winner: Mark (Sirloin Steak, Turnips, Mushrooms, Peaches, Butter); Elimination Challenge: Five teams of three were selected by drawing knives, each assigned a specific animal: bear, gorilla, lion, penguin, or vulture. The teams prepared a series of appetizers based on their animal's diet for 200 guests at the Lincoln Park Zoo. They were given 30 minutes and $500 to shop at the Whole Foods Market, three hours to prep in the Top Chef kitchen, and one hour to set up on-site. Wylie Dufresne guest judges.: Team Bear: Dale, Nikki, Spike; Team Gorilla: Antonia, Stephanie, Valerie; Team Lion: Erik, Richard, Ryan; Team Penguin: Andrew, Jennifer, Lisa; Team Vulture: Manuel, Mark, Zoi; Winner: Andrew (Squid Ceviche with Soy-Balsamic Tapioca; Yuzu-Mint Gelée "Glacier"); Eliminated: Valerie (Black Olive Blini with Fennel Mascarpone, Rutabaga & Beets)
46	3	"Block Party"	March 26, 2008
Quickfire Challenge: Each chef had to create an upscale taco. In addition to receiving immunity, the winner's dish was put on the menu of Rick Bayless' restaurant Topolobampo.: Winner: Richard (Jicama Tortillas with Avocado, Papaya & Cilantro Stems); Elimination Challenge: Divided into two teams of seven, the chefs catered a Chicago neighborhood's annual block party. The teams were required only to use ingredients they could get from the block's residents.: Blue Team: Antonia, Lisa, Manuel, Mark, Nikki, Richard, Stephanie; Red Team: Andrew, Dale, Erik, Jennifer, Ryan, Spike, Zoi; Winner: Stephanie (Mixed Fruit Crumble with Cinnamon Sugar Wontons); Eliminated: Erik (Corn dogs with Pomegranate Ketchup & Spicy Mustard)
47	4	"Film Food"	April 2, 2008
Quickfire Challenge: Each chef created a vegetable platter using the various vegetables provided and the items from the entire Top Chef pantry. The chefs had to utilize at least three culinary techniques in their dishes. The winner received immunity from elimination.: Winner: Dale (Daikon Marinated in Tobanjan, Tournée of Avocado & Cucumber); Elimination Challenge: The chefs drew knives to pair up into six teams of two. As the winner of the Quickfire, Dale could choose which pair to join to form a group of three. Then, they created a 6-course meal; the chefs' favorite films inspired each dish. The guest judges at the dinner included film critic Richard Roeper, chef Daniel Boulud, and actress Aisha Tyler.: First Course (Willy Wonka & the Chocolate Factory): Andrew, Dale, Richard; Second Course (Good Morning, Vietnam): Manuel, Spike; Third Course (Il Postino): Jennifer, Nikki; Fourth Course (A Christmas Story): Mark, Ryan; Fifth Course (Talk to Her): Antonia, Zoi; Sixth Course (Top Secret!): Lisa, Stephanie; Winner: Richard (Smoked Salmon with Faux Caviar, Tapioca Pearls, & White Chocolate Wasabi Sauce); Eliminated: Manuel (Summer Roll with Black Vermicelli, Green Apple, Chilean Sea Bass & Swiss Chard)
48	5	"The Elements"	April 9, 2008
Quickfire Challenge: The chefs participated in a comparison taste test. For every comparison, each chef was blindfolded and tasted two variations of a certain food, one of which was of a lesser quality than the other. The chefs were scored for each high-end ingredient they correctly identified. The winner received immunity from elimination. Chef Ming Tsai guest judges.: Winner: Antonia; Elimination Challenge: The chefs were split into four groups of three, based on the classical elements: earth, water, fire, and air. Each team had to create a first course based on their assigned element for 80 diners at Chicago's Celebrity Chef-Meals on Wheels Fundraiser, held at the old Marshall Field & Co. Building. Survey cards were filled out by the patrons of the dinner that evening and used as part of the judging process. The winner received a five-day trip for two to Italy.: Team Air: Jennifer, Nikki, Ryan; Team Earth: Antonia, Spike, Zoi; Team Fire: Dale, Lisa, Stephanie; Team Water: Andrew, Mark, Richard; Winner: Lisa (Grilled Shrimp with Pickled Chili Salad, Deviled Aioli & Miso-Smoked Bacon); Eliminated: Zoi (Beef Carpaccio with Mushroom Salad & Sunchoke Aioli)
49	6	"Tailgating"	April 16, 2008
Quickfire Challenge: Each contestant was allowed to taste three beers from several different brands before selecting one. Each contestant was then challenged to create a dish that paired well with their beer choice. The winner received immunity from elimination. Chicago chef Koren Grieveson from the restaurant Avec guest judged the challenge.: Winner: Jennifer (Land Shark Lager; Shrimp & Scallop Beignets with Fennel, Avocado & Pepper Pureés); Elimination Challenge: The contestants were asked to create meals for a tailgating party at Soldier Field prior to a Chicago Bears football game (Week 6 game versus the Minnesota Vikings). The chefs were given preparation time at the Top Chef kitchen and at the field, before serving, on grills. The top and bottom three dishes were selected from the crowd participating in the tailgating party, including former Bears players Richard Dent, Gale Sayers and William "The Refrigerator" Perry. The final decision of the winner and eliminated chef was left to the judges. The winner received a Weber Summit 650 Gas Grill and a Chicago Bears jersey labeled "Top Chef". Chef Paul Kahan guest judges.: Winner: Dale (Baby Back Ribs Marinated in Tandoori, Potato Salad with Raisins & Mango); Eliminated: Ryan (Bread Salad and Marinated Chicken, Poached Pear & Brandy Cocoa)
50	7	"Improv"	April 23, 2008
Quickfire Challenge: The chefs made desserts for the judges. In addition to receiving immunity from elimination, the winner had their Quickfire recipe placed in the Top Chef cookbook.: Winner: Richard (Banana Scallops with Banana Guacamole & Chocolate Ice Cream); Elimination Challenge: The chefs attended a performance of the improvisational comedy troupe, The Second City. During the performance, the Second City actors obtained various combinations of colors, emotions, and ingredients from the audience, creating five descriptions for meals that the chefs had to prepare. The chefs freely split into teams and selected the order for the courses. They discovered they could not use electric mixers or food processors during the challenge since they had been removed from the Top Chef kitchen. While cooking, the chefs also found out that, while an elaborate table was set up in the kitchen, they would serve their meals at the Top Chef house. They only had 20 minutes to move to the house following this announcement. Each member of the winning team received $2,500 worth of Calphalon kitchenware. Pastry chef Johnny Iuzzini guest judges.: First Course (Yellow, Love, Vanilla): Andrew, Spike; Second Course (Orange, Turned-On, Asparagus): Jennifer, Stephanie; Third Course (Green, Perplexed, Tofu): Dale, Richard; Fourth Course (Magenta, Drunk, Polish Sausage): Antonia, Lisa; Fifth Course (Purple, Depressed, Bacon): Mark, Nikki; Winners: Dale, Richard (Tofu Steak Marinated in Beef Fat with Green Curry); Eliminated: Jennifer (Ménage à trois of Orange with Goat Cheese, Asparagus, Salad & Olive Tapenade)
51	8	"Common Threads"	April 30, 2008
Quickfire Challenge: Each chef had to create an entrée in only 15 minutes, using Uncle Ben's Microwaveable Ready Rice as a primary ingredient. The winner received immunity from elimination.: Winner: Antonia (Rice Salad with Skirt Steak, Arugula, Red Onions & Cherry Tomatoes); Elimination Challenge: The contestants were told to make a healthy, simple, and flavorful meal for a family of four, using only $10. Meal preparation would take place at the Washburn Culinary Institute. At the institute, each chef was paired with a child from the Common Threads program who participated in preparing the dish and was also responsible for explaining the dish to fellow children from the program during the tasting. chef, cookbook author and restaurateur Art Smith, founder of the Common Threads program, was the episode's guest judge.: Winner: Antonia (Chicken & Vegetable Stir-Fry with Whole Wheat Noodles); Eliminated: Mark (Vegetable Curry, Cinnamon Rice & Cucumber Salad)
52	9	"Wedding Wars"	May 7, 2008
Quickfire Challenge: The chefs drew knives to split into two teams of four. The chefs competed in a mise en place relay race in these teams. One person from each team had to perform a basic kitchen task, such as supreming oranges and filleting fish, and then receive approval from Tom Colicchio before the next person on their team could begin the next task. The first team to complete all the tasks won. From this point on, the winners of the Quickfire Challenge no longer received immunity from elimination.: Team Fork: Andrew, Antonia, Richard, Stephanie; Team Spoon: Dale, Lisa, Nikki, Spike; Winner: Team Fork; Elimination Challenge: Instead of the typical "Restaurant Wars" challenge, the teams were challenged to "Wedding Wars". In the same teams used for the Quickfire, the chefs catered a 250-guest wedding (125 guests to be served per team) for a couple who owned a restaurant and wedding facility. Each team prepared a different menu; one team was responsible for meeting the bride's requests, while the other was for the groom. Team Fork, as the winner of the Quickfire, decided to cater for the bride. The teams were given 30 minutes to discuss the menu with the bride or groom, 30 minutes to plan, $3,000 to shop at a large food warehouse and $2,000 at Whole Foods Market, and 14 hours (through the night) of preparation time in the Top Chef kitchen, followed by additional preparation time at the banquet. Chicago-based pastry chef, cookbook author, and television personality Gale Gand appeared as a guest judge. The winner received a $2,000 gift certificate to Crate & Barrel.: Winner: Richard^{3}; Eliminated: Nikki
53	10	"Serve and Protect"	May 14, 2008
Quickfire Challenge: The chefs were given 45 minutes to create a modern take on a salad using fresh produce and items from the Top Chef pantry. Top Chef: Los Angeles finalist Sam Talbot guest judges.: Winner: Spike ("Sensual Beef Salad" with Pineapple, Radish, Cucumber & Skirt Steak); Elimination Challenge: The chefs were challenged to create a healthy, delicious, and filling box lunch meal for the members of the Chicago Police Academy. The meal had to contain at least one ingredient from each of the following categories: whole grain, lean protein, fruits, and vegetables. Any final preparation steps (such as microwaving) had to be completed by the diners. As the Quickfire winner, Spike was given ten additional minutes to shop and his first choice of each of the four required ingredients, which the other chefs, consequently, were not permitted to use. He chose bread, chicken, tomato, and lettuce as his exclusive ingredients. The winner received a bottle of wine from a Napa Valley winery and a trip to their vineyards.: Winner: Dale (Lemongrass Bison Cabbage Wrap with Brown Rice & Herb Salad); Eliminated: Andrew (Salmon Roll with Parsnip-Pine Nut "Rice" & Pickled Ginger Wasabi)
54	11	"Restaurant Wars"	May 21, 2008
Quickfire Challenge: Taking turns, each chef spent the same amount of time operating the egg station during the busy breakfast hours at Lou Mitchell's Restaurant and Bakery. The chef's performance would be judged by both Tom Colicchio and the restaurant's owner, Heleen Thanas, based on who she'd be most likely to hire.: Winner: Antonia; Elimination Challenge: For the standard "Restaurant Wars" challenge, the chefs had to open up a restaurant in teams of three for a dinner service, consisting of three courses with two selections each for approximately 35 guests the next day. The winner would be judged based on both the normal judges and comment cards filled out by the patrons. Each team had $1,500 to spend on food and $5,000 from Pier 1 Imports for decor. Antonia could select her teammates for the challenge as the Quickfire winner. One chef from each team was required to assist in front-of-house duties along with additional waitstaff. Midway through the challenge, each team's executive chef was allowed to select one additional assisting chef from the four most recently eliminated chefs: Andrew, Jennifer, Mark, and Nikki. Antonia chose Nikki and Dale chose Jennifer. The winner received a trip for two to Barcelona, Spain, including a guided wine tour. Chefs Anthony Bourdain and José Andrés guest judge.: Warehouse Kitchen: Antonia (EC), Richard, Stephanie (FOH); First Course: Beet Salad with Goat Cheese & Ras el hanout Spices; Linguine & Clams with Sausage & Horseradish Crème Fraîche; Second Course: Trout with Cauliflower; Lamb Loin & Braised Lamb Shank; Third Course: Gorgonzola Cheesecake with Sweet Potato Purée & Concord Grape Sauce; Banana "Scallops" with Banana Guacamole and Chocolate Ice Cream; Mai Buddha: Dale (EC), Lisa, Spike (FOH); First Course: Spicy Coconut Shrimp Laksa; Pork & Pickled Plum Pot Stickers; Second Course: Braised Short Ribs with Pickled Red Cabbage & Apple Basil Salad; Butterscotch Miso Scallops, Spicy Eggplant & Pickled Long Beans; Third Course: Halo-halo with Cantaloupe, Coconut, Kiwi, Avocado & Candied Nuts; Mango Sticky Rice with Toasted Coconut; Winner: Stephanie; Eliminated: Dale
55	12	"High Steaks"	May 28, 2008
Quickfire Challenge: At a meat packing warehouse, each chef was given twenty minutes to butcher and clean seven "tomahawk chops" from an aged side of beef. Then, at the Top Chef kitchen, they were given an additional thirty minutes to prepare two of the chops to the guest judge's preference: medium-rare.: Winner: Spike; Elimination Challenge: Each chef had to create an appetizer and entrée, in addition to working the line at Rick Tramonto's Steak & Seafood restaurant. As the Quickfire winner, Spike was able to select two proteins for his dishes, preventing the other chefs from using those proteins. He chose frozen scallops for his appetizer and tomahawk chops for his entrée. The winner received a cookbook by Rick Tramonto and a suite of GE Monogram appliances. Previous Top Chef winners Harold Dieterle, Ilan Hall, and Hung Huynh are in attendance.: Richard: (Hamachi with Crispy Sweetbreads, Radish, Avocado & Yuzu; Beef Fillet, Potato Puree, Turnips & Pickled Brussels Sprouts); Antonia: (Mushroom and Artichoke Salad, Poached Egg, Bacon Vinaigrette; Bone-In Ribeye with Fennel & Cipollinis, Shallot and Potato Gratin); Stephanie: (Sweetbreads with Golden Raisins, Fennel & Pine Nuts; Beef Tenderloin with Wild Mushrooms & Apple Sauce); Spike: (Seared Scallops with Hearts of Palm & Oyster Mushrooms; Tomahawk Chop, Sweet Potato Purée, Brussels Sprouts & Cipollinis); Lisa: (Grilled and Chilled Prawns, Lemon Zest & Tomato Salad, Crostini; N.Y. Strip Steak, Apple Caramel Sauce & Peanut Butter Mashed Potatoes); Winner: Stephanie; Eliminated: Spike
56	13	"Puerto Rico"	June 4, 2008
Quickfire Challenge: Six months after the previous episode in Chicago, the chefs arrived in San Juan, Puerto Rico. Each chef had to make frituras (fritters) using plantains as the primary ingredient.: Winner: Stephanie (Tostones with Seared Tuna; Pork & Shrimp Fritter with Brown Butter, Lime & Basil Sauce); Elimination Challenge: The chefs were asked to prepare three dishes each for a reception held at La Fortaleza, the official residence of the governor of Puerto Rico. Each chef was given a pig to butcher and had to use at least two different parts of it in two of their dishes. The last four previously eliminated chefs were returned as sous chefs to assist the competitors. As the Quickfire winner, Stephanie selected which sous chef would work with each contestant. She assigned Spike to Richard, Nikki to Antonia, Andrew to Lisa, and Dale to herself. While the chefs butchered the pig, the sous chefs shopped for ingredients at a local market. Then, the chefs had two hours of prep time the day before the reception, followed by five hours of cooking time just before the reception. The winner received a 2009 Toyota Corolla S. Wilo Benet guest judge, and First Lady of Puerto Rico Luisa Acevedo Vilá is in attendance.: Winner: Richard (Fresh Ham with Local Beans; Pressure Cooked Pork Belly with Pickled Watermelon; Pork Ribs with Malta and Soy Glaze; BBQ Pork Shoulder with Braised Greens & Mango); Eliminated: Antonia (Honey Pork Belly with Pickled Sweet Pepper Salad; Curried Pork with Pumpkin & Yuca; Pigeon Peas with Pork Sausage)
57	14	"Finale"	June 11, 2008
Elimination Challenge: For their final challenge, each chef was asked to create a four-course meal for nine guests, consisting of a fish course, a poultry course, a red meat course, and a dessert, in that order. Before they started to cook, the chefs had to select one of three famous New York chefs to act as their sous chef for the challenge. Additionally, each famous chef came paired with an array of proteins for the contestant to use in their first three dishes. The order for picking the sous chefs and proteins was determined by the number of previous elimination round wins, with ties broken by knife pulling. Stephanie chose celebrity chef, author, and restaurateur Eric Ripert, of Le Bernardin. Richard chose chef and restaurateur Dan Barber of Blue Hill at Stone Barns. Lisa chose April Bloomfield, also a chef and restaurateur, from The Spotted Pig. On the second and final day of cooking, the chefs had to finish the meal preparation alone.: Lisa: First Course: Grilled Prawns with Chili Basil Sauce & Crab, Homemade Potato Chips; Second Course: Tom Kha Gai Soup with Dumpling; Third Course: Wagyū Beef with Chayote & Cucumber Salad, Hot Sauce & Garlic Chips; Dessert: Black Thai Rice Pudding with Lime & Mango Crème, Taro & Coconut; Richard: First Course: Scallop with Mango & Pineapple Vinegar; Second Course: Guinea Hen, Chicken Egg, Foie Gras & Spring Vegetables; Third Course: Pickled Radishes, Mirin Broth & Pork Belly; Dessert: Banana "Scallop" with Bacon Ice Cream; Stephanie: First Course: Red Snapper, Truffled Clam & Asparagus Broth, Asparagus Salad; Second Course: Quail Breast over Lobster Ravioli with Mango-Lobster Sauce & Quail Egg; Third Course: Lamb with Maitake Mushrooms, Braised Pistachios, Blackberry & Olive Tapénade; Dessert: Ricotta Poundcake with Tropical Fruit & Banana Crème; Winner: Stephanie; Runners-up: Lisa, Richard
58	15	"Reunion"	June 18, 2008
