= Tiffani Faison =

American celebrity chef and restaurateur

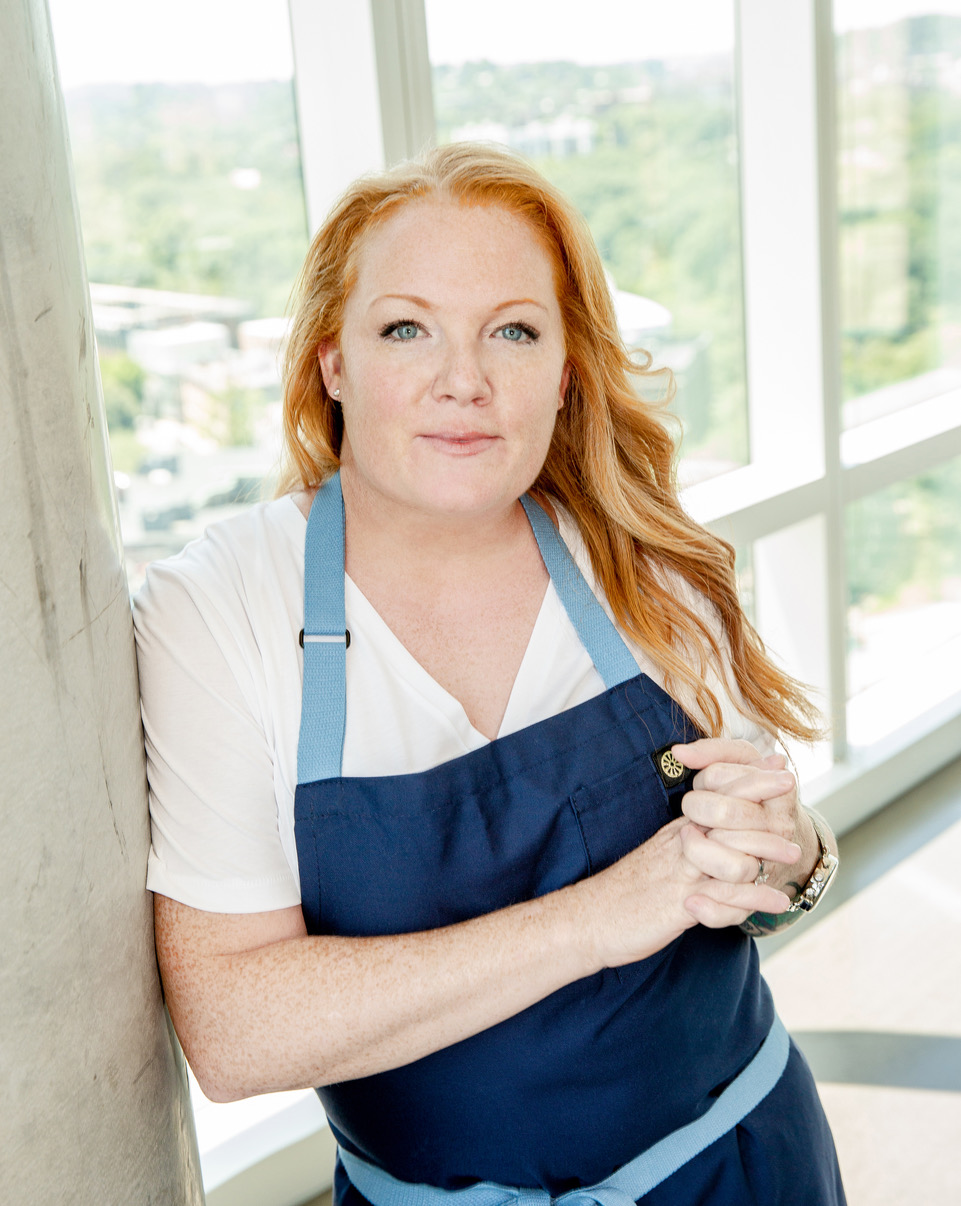
- Tiffani Faison, Top Chef All-Stars
- Born: Bremerhaven, Germany
- Culinary career
- Current restaurants
- Sweet Cheeks Q, Boston (2011–present) Fool's Errand, Boston (2018–present) Bubble Bath, Boston (2022–present) Tenderoni's, Boston (2022–present) Dive Bar, Boston (2022–present)
- Previous restaurants
- Tiger Mama, Boston (2015–2021); Orfano, Boston (2019–2022); Tenderoni's Fenway, Boston (2022–2024)
- Television shows
- Top Chef: San Francisco; Top Chef: All-Stars; Top Chef Duels; Chopped; Tournament of Champions

Tiffani Faison is an American celebrity chef and restaurateur. She is based in Boston, has served as a judge on Food Network's television series Chopped, and is a four-time James Beard Award Finalist for Best Chef: Northeast (2018, 2019, 2020, 2022). She was the winner of Season 3 of Tournament of Champions and was named Boston's Best Chef by Boston Magazine in 2022. She was one of two finalists on the first season of Bravo's reality show Top Chef, where she finished second to Harold Dieterle.

Her company, Big Heart Hospitality has owned the following restaurants: Sweet Cheeks Q, Orfano, Fool's Errand, Bubble Bath, Tenderoni's, Dive Bar, and Tiger Mama.

== Early career ==
Just prior to appearing on Top Chef, Faison was employed as chef de partie under Daniel Boulud at his signature, Michelin Star restaurant in the Wynn Las Vegas and also worked at Tao Asian Bistro at The Venetian in the same city.

After the airing of the final episode of Top Chef in May 2006, Faison took a summer position cooking at the Straight Wharf restaurant in Nantucket, Massachusetts, working under chefs Amanda Lydon and Gabriel Frasca. In 2007, she was executive chef at Todd English’s brasserie, Riche, in New Orleans, Louisiana. In May 2007, Faison cohosted a Greek Isles culinary cruise for Olivia, a lesbian lifestyle and travel services company. Faison returned to Boston, and was Executive Chef at Michela Larson’s Rocca Kitchen & Bar, a popular neighborhood space on Friday nights, until it closed in December 2010.

== Television appearances ==
Faison first rose to culinary fame when she placed runner-up in the first Season of Top Chef. She then took part in a single episode cooking competition called 4 Star All Stars which pitted four Top Chef season one contestants (Stephen Asprinio, Dieterle, Faison and David Martin) against four season two contestants (Elia Aboumrad, Ilan Hall, Sam Talbot and Marcel Vigneron). Faison's team scored the winning menu and received a $20,000 donation to the Susan G. Komen for the Cure charity. This episode aired on Bravo on June 6, 2007.

Faison also participated in the Top Chef Holiday Special that aired on December 7, 2007, winning the $20,000 prize. Faison returned as a contestant on season 8 of Top Chef and was eliminated in the sixth episode. Faison finished runner-up in the Top Chef Duels 2014 competition. As of 2020, Faison is a judge on Chopped and participated as the judge to beat on one of the beat the judge episodes. She also made it to the finals of Chopped: Grudge Match, placing second to Marcus Samuelsson.

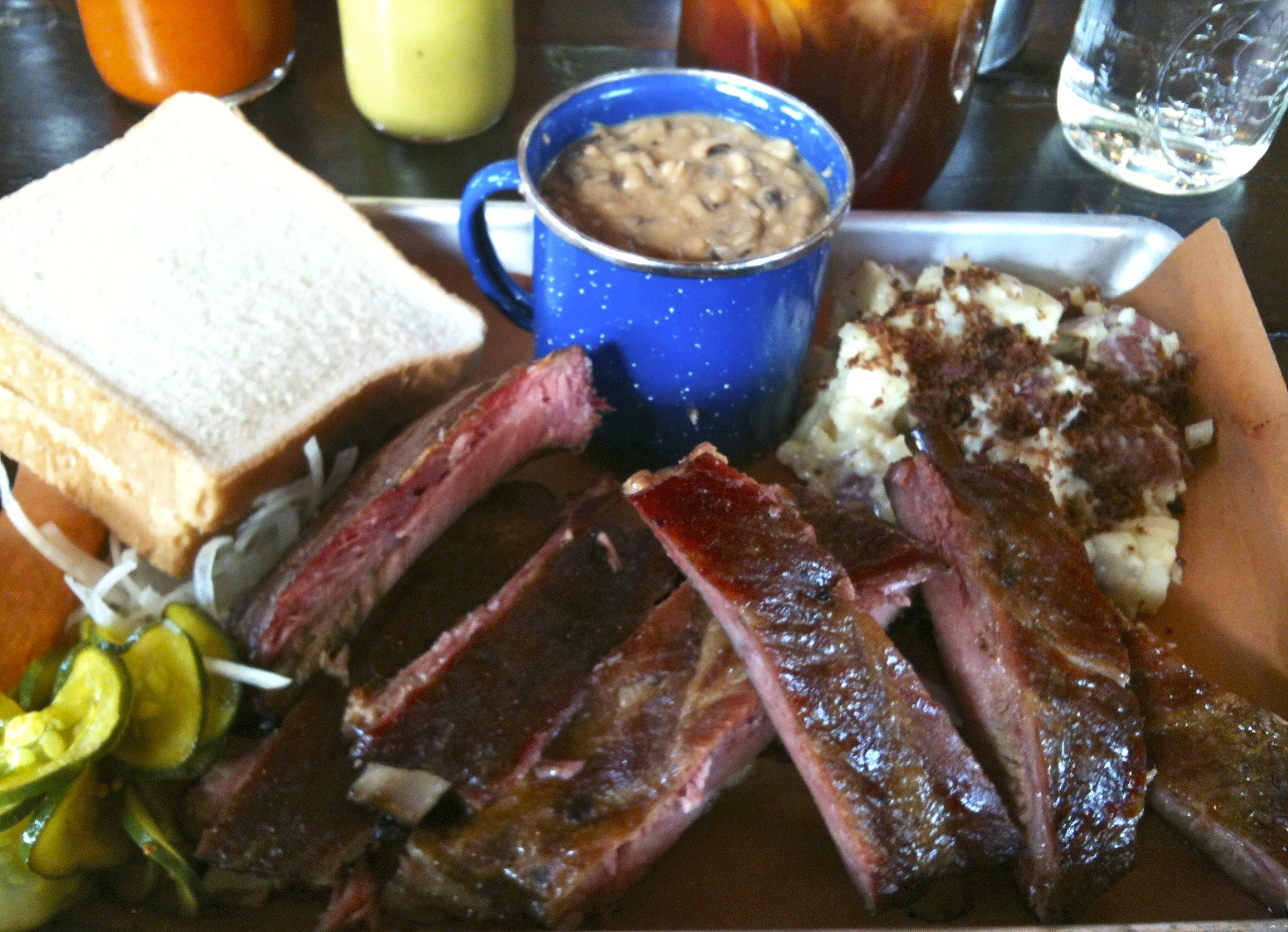
Sweet Cheeks Q in 2012

In 2021, Faison competed in Food Network's Tournament of Champions, and in 2022, Faison returned to compete and win Tournament of Champions, Season 3, as well as serve as a judge on Chopped: Casino Royale. Tiffani Faison won Tournament of Champions 3, defeating Brooke Williamson in the finale.

Faison has also been a culinary guest on such national television shows as NBC TODAY, CBS: This Morning and America's Test Kitchen.

== Chef and restaurateur ==
Faison is currently the owner and head chef of Sweet Cheeks Q, a Texas-style barbecue restaurant in Boston's Fenway District. Opened in late 2011, Sweet Cheeks Q was her first restaurant. Sweet Cheeks Q has been named as Boston's Best Barbecue by local and national media, and Forbes wrote that its "biscuits were the best in the world."

In December 2015, she opened her acclaimed restaurant, Tiger Mama in Fenway, focusing on Southeast Asian cuisine. Faison closed Tiger Mama in late October 2021 to focus on a new restaurant located in the same space in Fenway. Tenderoni's, a pizza parlor concept, opened there in November 2022. It was shuttered permanently in June 2024.

In February 2018, Faison opened up her third Fenway restaurant, the "Adult Snack Bar" Fool's Errand. Her venture Orfano, which serves Italian-American cuisine, opened in August 2019 and received a three star review from The Boston Globe. It later closed in June 2022. In 2022, Faison opened Tenderoni's, Dive Bar, and Bubble Bath within High Street Place, a new food hall in Downtown Boston.

== Restaurants ==
=== Active ===
- Sweet Cheeks Q (2011–present), Boston, Massachusetts
- Fool's Errand (February 2018–present), Boston, Massachusetts
- Bubble Bath (March 2022–present), inside High Street Place, Boston, Massachusetts
- Tenderoni's (March 2022–present), inside High Street Place, Boston, Massachusetts
- Dive Bar (March 2022–present), inside High Street Place, Boston, Massachusetts
- Bubble Bath Back Bay (August 2025–present), inside CitizenM Hotel, Boston, Massachusetts

=== Closed ===
- Tiger Mama (December 2015–October 2021), Boston, Massachusetts
- Orfano (August 2019–June 2022), Boston, Massachusetts
- Tenderoni's Fenway (November 2022–June 2024), Boston, Massachusetts

== Personal life ==
She was born in Bremerhaven, Germany, to American parents, where her father was stationed in the United States military. The family moved around several times during her childhood and by the time she was in high school, settled in Santa Rosa, California. She was married but split from her wife in 2019. Faison formerly identified as bisexual, but as of 2019 identifies as lesbian.

=== Associations ===
In high school, Faison began volunteering for HIV/AIDS organizations. Faison currently serves on the Board of Directors for Women Chefs & Restaurateurs as well as on The Boston Alliance of Lesbian Gay Bisexual Transgender Queer Youth.

In September 2019, she was appointed to The Commonwealth of Massachusetts’ Restaurant Promotion Commission for her commitment to the state's restaurant business.

== Awards and accolades ==
- James Beard Foundation, Nominee, Best Chef: Northeast (2022)
- James Beard Foundation, Nominee, Best Chef: Northeast (2020)
- James Beard Foundation, Nominee, Best Chef: Northeast (2019)
- James Beard Foundation, Nominee, Best Chef: Northeast (2018)
- Boston Magazine, Best Chef: Boston (2016)
