= Top Chef: All-Stars =

Season 8 of American television series

- Season 8
- Hosted by: Padma Lakshmi
- Judges: Tom Colicchio; Gail Simmons; Anthony Bourdain
- No. of contestants: 18
- Winner: Richard Blais
- Runner-up: Mike Isabella
- Location: New York City, New York
- Finals venue: The Bahamas
- Fan Favorite: Carla Hall
- No. of episodes: 17

Release
- Original network: Bravo
- Original release: December 1, 2010 – April 6, 2011

Season chronology
- ← Previous; D.C. Next → Texas

Top Chef: All-Stars is the eighth season of the American reality television series Top Chef. The season was first filmed in New York City before concluding in The Bahamas. All-Stars consisted of chefs from the previous seven seasons who did not win the title of Top Chef. It premiered on December 1, 2010, and concluded on April 6, 2011. The cast was announced during the Top Chef: D.C. reunion special on September 22, 2010. The prize money awarded to the winner of the season was US$200,000. In the season finale, Top Chef: Chicago runner-up Richard Blais was declared the winner over Top Chef: Las Vegas contestant Mike Isabella. Top Chef: New York runner-up Carla Hall was voted Fan Favorite.

== Contestants ==
Eighteen past Top Chef contestants competed in Top Chef: All-Stars.

Name	Hometown	Current Residence (Note: The contestants' city and state of residence during time of filming.)	Age	Season	Original Placement
Elia Aboumrad	Mexico City, Mexico	Los Angeles, California	27	Season 2	4th
Stephen Asprinio	West Palm Beach, Florida	New York, New York	29	Season 1	5th
Richard Blais	Uniondale, New York	Atlanta, Georgia	38	Season 4	Runner-up
Jennifer Carroll	Philadelphia, Pennsylvania		35	Season 6	4th
Tiffany Derry	Beaumont, Texas	Dallas, Texas	27	Season 7	5th
Tiffani Faison	Bremerhaven, Germany	Boston, Massachusetts	33	Season 1	Runner-up
Carla Hall	Nashville, Tennessee	Washington, D.C.	46	Season 5	Runner-up
Mike Isabella	Little Ferry, New Jersey	Washington, D.C.	35	Season 6	7th
Jamie Lauren	New York, New York	Los Angeles, California	32	Season 5	7th
Dale Levitski	Chicago, Illinois		37	Season 3	Runner-up
Antonia Lofaso	Los Angeles, California		34	Season 4	4th
Spike Mendelsohn	Clearwater Beach, Florida	Washington, D.C.	29	Season 4	5th
Angelo Sosa	Durham, Connecticut	New York, New York	35	Season 7	Runner-up
Dale Talde	Chicago, Illinois	New York, New York	32	Season 4	6th
Casey Thompson	Cedar Hill, Texas	Fort Worth, Texas	32	Season 3	Runner-up
Marcel Vigneron	Bainbridge Island, Washington	Los Angeles, California	30	Season 2	Runner-up
Fabio Viviani	Florence, Italy	Moorpark, California	32	Season 5	4th
Tre Wilcox	Duncanville, Texas	Dallas, Texas	34	Season 3	8th

== Contestant progress ==
Episode #		1	2	3	4	5	6	7	8	9	10	11	12^{4}	13	14	15	16
Quickfire Challenge Winner(s)		Antonia; Dale T. Richard; Spike	Tiffani	Richard^{1} Spike^{1} Stephen^{1} Tre^{1}	Tre	Mike	N/A^{3}	Dale T.	Richard	Dale T.^{1}	Dale T.^{1}	Mike^{1}	Carla^{1}	Mike^{1} Richard^{1} Tiffany^{1}	Antonia^{1} Tiffany^{1}	Mike^{1}	N/A
Contestant		Elimination Challenge Results															
1	Richard	HIGH^{2}	WIN	IN	HIGH	IN	LOW	WIN	IN	IN	HIGH	WIN	IN	HIGH	IN	WIN	WINNER
2	Mike	IN	IN	IN	IN	IN	HIGH	LOW	LOW	IN	IN	HIGH	IN	WIN	WIN	IN	RUNNER-UP
3	Antonia	IN	LOW	HIGH	HIGH	LOW	LOW	LOW	WIN	HIGH	HIGH	HIGH	WIN	LOW	IN	OUT	
4	Tiffany	IN	LOW	IN	LOW	HIGH	HIGH	LOW	HIGH	LOW	LOW	LOW	IN	LOW	OUT		
5	Carla	IN	IN	IN	WIN	LOW	WIN	HIGH	HIGH	WIN	LOW	LOW	IN	OUT			
6	Dale T.	IN	IN	WIN	IN	WIN	HIGH	HIGH	LOW	LOW	WIN	OUT					
7	Angelo	WIN	WIN	HIGH	HIGH	HIGH	HIGH	LOW	WIN	HIGH	OUT						
8	Fabio	LOW	HIGH	LOW	HIGH	HIGH	LOW	HIGH	HIGH	OUT							
9	Tre	IN	LOW	HIGH	LOW	LOW	HIGH	HIGH	OUT								
10	Marcel	IN	WIN	IN	IN	IN	LOW	OUT									
11	Jamie	HIGH	IN	IN	IN	LOW	OUT										
11	Tiffani	IN	IN	LOW	IN	IN	OUT										
13	Casey	IN	IN	IN	LOW	OUT											
14	Spike	HIGH	IN	IN	OUT												
15	Dale L.	IN	IN	OUT													
15	Stephen	LOW	HIGH	OUT													
17	Jennifer	IN	OUT														
18	Elia	OUT															

^Note 1: The chef(s) did not receive immunity for winning the Quickfire Challenge.
^Note 2: Despite Richard making one of the judges' favorite dishes, he was seen plating past the Elimination Challenge's allotted time limit and was thus ineligible to win.
^Note 3: There was no Quickfire Challenge in this episode.
^Note 4: The judges could not decide on a losing dish, so all five chefs advanced to the finals.

(WINNER) The chef won the season and was crowned "Top Chef".
(RUNNER-UP) The chef was a runner-up for the season.
(WIN) The chef won the Elimination Challenge.
(HIGH) The chef was selected as one of the top entries in the Elimination Challenge, but did not win.
(IN) The chef was not selected as one of the top or bottom entries in the Elimination Challenge and was safe.
(LOW) The chef was selected as one of the bottom entries in the Elimination Challenge, but was not eliminated.
(OUT) The chef lost the Elimination Challenge.

== Episodes ==
No. overall	No. in season	Title	Original release date	US viewers (millions)
105	1	"History Never Repeats"	December 1, 2010	1.66
Quickfire Challenge: The chefs from each season teamed up to create a dish that represented the city where their seasons took place. The winning team received immunity from elimination.: Winners: Antonia, Dale T., Richard, Spike (Pork & Black Pepper Sausage, Mustard Ice Cream); Elimination Challenge: The chefs were confronted with the ingredients from the dishes that sent them home during their respective seasons. Each chef had to recreate their losing dish and turn it into a success. The winner received $10,000.: Winner: Angelo (Homemade Ramen with Sweet Glazed Pork Belly & Watermelon); Eliminated: Elia (Red Snapper Steamed in Ti Leaf with Snapper Jus)
106	2	"Night at the Museum"	December 8, 2010	2.03
Quickfire Challenge: The chefs had to create a midnight snack for children spending the night at the American Museum of Natural History. The snack had to be edible without the need for utensils and served inside of a brown paper bag. The top two chefs served their midnight snacks for 150 children at the museum, who decided the winner of the Quickfire Challenge.: Winner: Tiffani (Rice Crispy Treat Snowball with Malted Milk & Graham Crackers); Elimination Challenge: Competing as two teams, the chefs created a breakfast for the children and their parents that was limited to a specific dinosaur's diet: a Tyrannosaurus rex (meat, eggs, and dairy) or a Brontosaurus (fruits, vegetables, and grains). Musician Joe Jonas and Top Chef: San Francisco host Katie Lee guest judge.: Team T-Rex: Antonia, Casey, Dale L., Jamie, Jennifer, Tiffani, Tiffany, Tre; Team Brontosaurus: Angelo, Carla, Dale T., Fabio, Marcel, Mike, Richard, Spike, Stephen; Winners: Angelo, Marcel, Richard (Banana Parfait with Seasonal Fruit & Tandoori Maple); Eliminated: Jennifer (Braised Bacon & Hard Boiled Eggs)
107	3	"New York's Finest"	December 15, 2010	1.98
Quickfire Challenge: Teams of four competed in a race to complete three mise en place tasks: simultaneously butchering lamb ribs, chopping garlic, and cleaning artichokes. The first team to finish started a fifteen-minute timer; all teams had to prepare a dish within that time limit, using all three prepared ingredients. The other teams were required to complete their mise en place tasks before cooking. While the winning team did not earn immunity, each member won $5,000. New York celebrity chef, restaurateur and author David Chang is the guest judge.: Red Team: Antonia, Casey, Dale L., Jamie; Blue Team: Richard, Spike, Stephen, Tre; Green Team: Angelo, Fabio, Mike, Tiffany; White Team: Carla, Dale T., Marcel, Tiffani; Winner: Blue Team (Crispy Lamb Chop with Artichoke Three Ways); Elimination Challenge: Using the same teams from the Quickfire, the chefs competed among themselves in a double elimination to prepare a dish in the style of one of four notable New York City restaurants -- David Chang's Ma Peche, David Burke's Townhouse, Michael White's Marea, and Wylie Dufresne's Wd~50 -- after dining at their drawn restaurant, where they also prepare their food. Dishes were tasted by the celebrity chefs who ran those restaurants; each master chef's favorite was eligible to win, while their least favorite was eligible for elimination. The winner received a six-night trip to New Zealand.: Winner: Dale T. (Sunny Side Up Egg Dumpling, Braised Pork Belly, Milk Ramen with Bacon, Beef & Pork); Eliminated: Dale L. (Roasted Veal Loin, Peanuts, Popcorn, French Toast, Corn & Thyme Caramel); Stephen (Coho Salmon, Black Mission Figs, Broccoli Rapini, Fennel Pollen)
108	4	"Advantage Chef"	December 22, 2010	2.12
Quickfire Challenge: The chefs prepared a stuffing dish. All cutlery and utensils had been removed from the kitchen, so the contestants were forced to improvise tools. The winner earned $20,000.: Winner: Tre (Southwestern Stuffing with Bacon, Cheddar, Bell Pepper, Chili Powder); Elimination Challenge: The chefs were divided into two teams to individually cook for the players in the U.S. Open. The teams designated representatives for head-to-head match-ups, which were scored like a tennis match. The first team to reach four points got the team victory. Chefs that scored a point for the winning team (indicated in italics below) were eligible for the win, while chefs that lost a point for the losing team were eligible for elimination. Though all chefs prepared a dish, due to the format, some ended up not serving; these chefs were ineligible to win, but were still safe from elimination. The winner received a trip to Italy. Tennis player Taylor Dent and Tony Mantuano, chef and owner of Spiaggia, guest judge.: Orange Team: Antonia, Carla, Dale T., Fabio, Marcel, Mike, Richard; Yellow Team: Angelo, Casey, Jamie, Spike, Tiffani, Tiffany, Tre; Round 1: Casey vs. Fabio; Round 2: Tiffani vs. Dale T.; Round 3: Angelo vs. Marcel; Round 4: Tiffany vs. Antonia; Round 5: Spike vs. Richard; Round 6: Tre vs. Carla; Winner: Carla (African Groundnut Soup with Baked Sweet Potatoes, Adzuki Beans & Peanuts); Eliminated: Spike (Tomato Tamarind Soup, Olive Oil Poached Shrimp, Pineapple, Tomatoes & Dill)
109	5	"Dim Sum Lose Some"	January 5, 2011	N/A
Quickfire Challenge: In a series first, head judge Tom Colicchio entered the competition, challenging the chefs to beat his time in creating a dish: 8 minutes, 37 seconds. The winner received a new Toyota Prius.: Winner: Mike (Pan-Roasted Branzino with Black Olive & Caper Stew).; Elimination Challenge: The chefs went to Chinatown and worked as a team to serve dim sum for the locals. Susur Lee guest judges.: Winner: Dale T. (Sweet Sticky Rice with Chinese Bacon Wrapped in a Banana Leaf); Eliminated: Casey (Chinese Chicken Feet & Scallion Pancake)
110	6	"We're Gonna Need a Bigger Boat"	January 12, 2011	2.36
Elimination Challenge: In a double elimination, the remaining all-stars went fishing in Montauk. They then cooked fish dishes at the Water Taxi Beach in Long Island City for a summer's-end beach party. The winner received a trip to Amsterdam and $5,000 for airfare. Kerry Heffernan guest judges.: Team 1: Antonia, Jamie, Tiffani; Team 2: Carla, Dale T., Tre; Team 3: Angelo, Mike, Tiffany; Team 4: Fabio, Marcel, Richard; Winner: Carla (Smoked Blue Fish Lettuce Wrap, Pickled Watermelon Rind, Radishes, Bagel Croutons).; Eliminated: Jamie (Striped Bass, Watermelon Salad with Fresh Dill, Shaved Radishes & Cucumber Water); Tiffani (Smoked Blue Fish with Tomato, Roasted Corn & Zucchini Ribbon Salad)
111	7	"Restaurant Wars - One Night Only"	January 19, 2011	2.33
Quickfire Challenge: The chefs went to the kitchen of noted seafood restaurant Le Bernardin for a knife skills challenge, butchering and cleaning whole fish. After being judged by Anthony Bourdain and Justo Thomas, the top four chefs competed in a 45-minute cook-off using only the remaining pieces of the cleaned fish: eyes, organs, cheeks, collars, fins, and tails.: Winner: Dale T. (Fluke Back Fin Sashimi with Cucumber & Fluke Liver Sauce; Bacon Dashi with Salt Roasted Cod Collar); Elimination Challenge: The ten remaining chefs were formed into two teams and had 24 hours to create pop-up restaurants. The winning and losing restaurants were selected by the diners. The individual winner, selected by the judges, received $10,000. Dana Cowin and Ludo Lefebvre guest judge.: Bodega: Carla, Dale T. (EC), Fabio (FOH), Richard, Tre; Appetizer: Bag of Potato Chips with Fried Herbs & Sea Salt (Dale T.); First Course: Raw Tuna Belly & Fried Chicken Skin with Chilies & Lime (Richard); Bacon, Egg & Cheese with Homemade Focaccia (Dale T.); Second Course: Chicken-Fried Codfish & Brussels Kraut (Richard); Pork Shoulder, Grits with Cheddar Cheese, Corona & Lime Sauce (Tre); Third Course: Amaretto Cake with Candied Lemon Peel & Cappuccino Mousse (Fabio); Blueberry Pie with Dry Milk Ice Cream (Carla); Etch: Angelo, Antonia, Marcel (EC), Mike, Tiffany (FOH); First Course: Frisée & Shaved Asparagus Salad with Egg & Chorizo (Tiffany); Crudo of Fluke, Grapes, Pink Peppercorns & Lemon Zest (Angelo); Second Course: Roasted Monkfish with Kalamata Olives, Peperonata & Parsley (Marcel); Braised Pork Belly & Octopus with Cannellini Beans (Mike); Third Course: Ricotta Gnudi, Braised Oxtail Ragout, Arugula & Lemon Zest (Antonia); Slow-Cooked Lamb Chop, Cauliflower Purée, Turmeric & Honey (Mike & Angelo); Fourth Course: Duo of Peaches: Unripened Peach & Sweet Peach with Coconut Foam & Powder (Marcel); Winner: Richard; Eliminated: Marcel
112	8	"An Offer They Can't Refuse"	February 2, 2011	2.34
Quickfire Challenge: The nine remaining chefs created a visually appealing dish that was judged solely on presentation, with fashion designer Isaac Mizrahi as guest judge.: Winner: Richard (Black Chocolate Ice Cream, Menthol Crystals, Herbal Salad & Mint Ice Cream Dots); Elimination Challenge: The chefs cooked a family-style Italian meal at Rao's restaurant for the judges, as well as the restaurant's owners and staff. They were divided into three groups: antipasti, primi, and secondi. The chefs were judged individually on their dishes. In attendance are actor Frank Pellegrino and his son Frank Pellegino Jr., of the family that owns Rao's, Rao's executive chef Dino Gatto, and actress Lorraine Bracco.: Winner: Antonia (Mussels with Fennel, White Wine, Garlic & Parsley Ciabatta); Eliminated: Tre (Grilled Vegetable Risotto, Marinated Tomatoes & Fresh Basil)
113	9	"Feeding Fallon"	February 9, 2011	2.23
Quickfire Challenge: The eight remaining chefs created fondue dishes and were judged by their fellow contestants. The chefs rated their top three and bottom three dishes, and could not vote for themselves. The winner received a three-day trip to Napa Valley. From this point forward, the winners of the Quickfire no longer received immunity from elimination.: Winner: Dale T. (Pho with Beef, Bread, Charred Ginger, Lime, Sriracha & Broth).; Elimination Challenge: The chefs traveled to NBC Studios at the Rockefeller Center, where they participated in the Cell Phone Shootout on an episode of Late Night with Jimmy Fallon. In the shootout, they selected the dishes they had to prepare for the challenge and then cooked one of Jimmy Fallon's favorite dishes for his birthday lunch at Tom Colicchio's restaurant, Colicchio and Sons. The winner received a cooking segment on an episode of Late Night with Jimmy Fallon and a trip to Tokyo. Guests include Steve Higgins, Nancy Juvonen, and A. D. Miles.: Winner: Carla (Chicken Pot Pie with Carrots, Celery, Pea Salt & Herbs).; Eliminated: Fabio (Hamburger, Melted Cheddar Cheese Sauce & Fries)
114	10	"Lock Down"	February 16, 2011	N/A
Quickfire Challenge: The seven remaining chefs baked cookies for Elmo, Cookie Monster, and Telly, from Sesame Street. The winner received $5,000.: Winner: Dale T. (Pretzel & Potato Chip Shortbread Cookie with Salted Caramel Chocolate Ganache).; Elimination Challenge: The chefs cooked a meal at a Target store using only ingredients and cooking supplies available inside the store. The winner received $25,000. Chef Ming Tsai guest judges.: Winner: Dale T. (Ribeye Grilled Cheese Sandwich & Spicy Tomato Soup).; Eliminated: Angelo (Baked Potato Soup with Bacon, Onions, Sour Cream, Potato Skins, Scallions & Cheddar Cheese)
115	11	"For the Gulf"	February 23, 2011	2.61
Quickfire Challenge: Each chef prepared a Southern-style dish with a deep-fried element. The winner received $5,000. Chef Paula Deen guest judges.: Winner: Mike (Fried Chicken Oysters with Mustard Gravy & Oyster Liquor).; Elimination Challenge: The chefs catered a charity benefit for the Greater New Orleans Foundation, an organization that provides assistance to fisheries and tourism impacted by the Deepwater Horizon oil spill. Six previously eliminated contestants from this season were paired with a Gulf Coast seafood. The chefs had to choose a pair of an ingredient and an assistant. The winner received a trip to Barbados. Chefs John Besh, David Burke, Carmen González, and Jonathan Waxman guest judge.: Winner: Richard (Crispy Gulf Snapper with Pulled Pork & Citrus Grits); Eliminated: Dale T. (Amberjack Stew with Andouille Sausage & Potatoes, Creole Mustard Crouton)
116	12	"Give Me Your Huddled Masses"	March 2, 2011	2.48
Quickfire Challenge: The chefs made dishes using ingredients found in a ferry snack bar, during a trip from Manhattan to Ellis Island.: Winner: Carla (Orange & Papaya Salad with Carrot & Rosemary Juice); Elimination Challenge: The chefs had to create a dish inspired by their ancestry (with insight and inspiration from research into their family history by a leading genealogist) and prepare a meal for one of their family members and the judges. The winner secured a spot in the Final 4 and received a Toyota Highlander Hybrid. Chef Dan Barber guest judges both challenges.: Winner: Antonia (Braised Veal, Rapini Leaf & Fava Bean Risotto).
117	13	"Fit For a King"	March 9, 2011	2.44
Quickfire Challenge: The remaining chefs competed in a culinary duel against the Top Chef from their season at Fort Charlotte. Each season's chefs were given a mystery ingredient selected for them by Tom Colicchio, which they had to share. The chefs had 40 minutes to create a dish featuring their ingredient. Each winner (indicated in italics below) won $10,000. Stephanie, going up against two competitors from her season, was eligible to win up to $20,000.: Season 4 (Veal): Stephanie Izard vs. Antonia vs. Richard; Season 5 (Lamb): Hosea Rosenberg vs. Carla; Season 6 (Duck): Michael Voltaggio vs. Mike; Season 7 (Pork): Kevin Sbraga vs. Tiffany; Elimination Challenge: The chefs created meals for the King of Junkanoo with limited cooking equipment. Guests included Éric Ripert, Percy Francis, and past winners Michael Voltaggio, Kevin Sbraga, Stephanie Izard, and Hosea Rosenberg.: Winner: Mike (Sous Vide Chicken, Mushrooms, Yams, Lobster Sauce & Lobster Hash); Eliminated: Carla (Fried Pork Medallion with Sweet Potato Purée, Apple Sauce & Apple Chip)
118	14	"Island Fever"	March 16, 2011	2.26
Quickfire Challenge: Working in teams of two, the chefs had to make 100 identical dishes in one hour. The winners split $5,000.: Red Team: Antonia and Tiffany; Blue Team: Mike and Richard; Winner: Red Team (Beef Tenderloin Salad with Cilantro, Mint, Basil and Chimichurri Sauce).; Elimination Challenge: On a deserted island with minimal facilities, the chefs catered a high-end lunch party for a yacht club's 80th anniversary and served up Bahamian delicacies, including conch, which they had to catch from the ocean. Guests include chef Lorena Garcia and Commodore of the Nassau Yacht Club Thierry Huguenin.: Winner: Mike (Banana Leaf Wrapped Grouper, Braised Pineapple & Conch Vinaigrette); Eliminated: Tiffany (Conch & Coconut Chowder with Sweet Potatoes & Conch Ceviche)
119	15	"The Last Supper"	March 23, 2011	2.38
Quickfire Challenge: Each chef completed a challenge based on a Quickfire from a previous season; the competitors assigned the challenges to one another. Midway through the competition, an additional twist element was added inspired by another previous Quickfire. The winner received $5,000.: Winner: Mike (Pork Shoulder with Black Beans, Chili Paste, Ginger & Cabbage Salad); Elimination Challenge (Part 1): For the first portion of a two-part challenge, the chefs prepared a meal, inspired by what one of the guest judges would want for their last meal. Guests include chefs Masaharu Morimoto, Wolfgang Puck, Melanie Dunea, and Michelle Bernstein.: Winner: Richard (Beef Goulash, Spaetzel with Sour Cream & Apple strudel with Tarragon); Elimination Challenge (Part 2): Following the announcement of the winner, the two losing chefs were asked to cook one last perfect bite to secure the last spot in the season finale.: Eliminated: Antonia (Seared Grouper in Coconut Lobster Broth with Yam, Apple & Dill Pollen Relish)
120	16	"Finale"	March 30, 2011	2.77
Elimination Challenge: The two finalists were asked to design their own dream restaurant and create a four-course tasting menu. Each chef was allowed to work with three sous chefs. The sous chefs were selected from the sixteen previously eliminated contestants through a blind taste test by the finalists of an amuse-bouche created by the eliminated chefs. Richard was assisted by Angelo, Antonia, and Spike. Mike was assisted by Carla, Jamie, and Tiffani. Guests include Lidia Bastianich, Hubert Keller, Alfred Portale, Bill Terlato, Art Smith, and Curtis Stone.: Mike: First Course: Spiced Beets with Mozzarella, Truffle & Chocolate Vinaigrette; Second Course: Halibut with Kumquats Marmalade, Cauliflower Purée & Pancetta Crumbs; Third Course: Braised Pork Shoulder with Pepperoni Sauce, Roasted Cabbage & Turnips; Fourth Course: Rosemary Caramel Custard & Pine Nuts with Citrus, Celery & Apple; Richard: Amuse-bouche: Raw Oysters with Crème Fraîche Pearls & Salsa Verde; First Course: Raw Hamachi with Fried Veal Sweetbreads, Garlic Mayonnaise & Pickled Celery; Second Course: Pork Belly, Black Cod Cutlet, Bone Marrow, Beets, Brussels Sprouts & Kumquat; Third Course: Beef Short Rib with Mushrooms, Red Cabbage Marmalade & Celery Root Horseradish Purée; Fourth Course: Cornbread with Foie Gras Ice Cream & Whipped Mango; Winner: Richard; Runner-up: Mike
121	17	"Reunion"	April 6, 2011	1.68
