= Dale Levitski =

American chef

- Born: Dale Levitski; Chicago, Illinois, U.S.
- Culinary career
- Previous restaurant(s): * Sinema, Nashville (2014–2016)
- Television shows: Top Chef: Miami; Top Chef: All-Stars

Dale Levitski is an American chef and television personality. He is a former Top Chef television series alum.

== Career ==
=== Television ===
Dale Levitski competed on Top Chef season 3. After having been one of the runners-up to Hung Huynh (along with Casey Thompson), Levitski was invited to compete again on Top Chef season 8 among the All-Stars. He was eliminated in the third episode.

=== Chicago ===
After leaving the TV show, it took Levitski 18 months to get going on his next project. He rebounded to open Sprout in 2009, garnering praise, three stars from the Chicago Tribune, and a semifinalist nod from the James Beard Foundation for Best Chef: Midwest, something that might be considered a coup considering the glut of competition in the brutally tough Chicago-centric category." A year after Sprout opened, the restaurant received a three star rating from the Chicago Tribune and also was named by Chicago Magazine as a Best Restaurant. Levitski also opened a bistro called Frog n' Snail. Levitski started to have failing health due to the stress of the two restaurants. He decided to leave Chicago, and the two restaurants closed after his departure.

=== Nashville ===
In 2014 Levitski moved from Chicago to Nashville, Tennessee, and opened a new restaurant called Sinema in the old Melrose Theater. He left the project in 2016.
