= Top Chef Duels =

American television series

- Genre: Reality competition; Cooking show
- Presented by: Curtis Stone
- Judges: Curtis Stone; Gail Simmons
- Country of origin: United States
- Original language: English
- No. of seasons: 1
- No. of episodes: 10

Production
- Executive producers: Dan Cutforth; Jane Lipsitz
- Camera setup: Multiple
- Running time: 42 minutes
- Production company: Magical Elves

Original release
- Network: Bravo
- Release: August 6 – October 8, 2014

Top Chef Duels is an American reality competition series that premiered on August 6, 2014, on Bravo. The culinary show is one of the several spin-off series of the popular cooking competition show Top Chef aired on the same network. Announced in January 2014 as Top Chef Extreme, the series features eighteen contestants who have previously competed in Top Chef and Top Chef Masters. During each episode, two of the contestants face each other in various culinary tasks. The winner is picked at the end of an episode to compete in the championship finale. The series is hosted by Curtis Stone. Besides hosting, Stone is also a judge together with Gail Simmons, while Wolfgang Puck, Hugh Acheson and other celebrity guest judges make numerous appearances throughout the series.

CJ Jacobson won the series and was awarded $100,000, and an opportunity to appear on the Food & Wine magazine.

== Episodes ==
Winners are listed in bold

No.	Title	Original release date
1	"**Richard Blais** vs. Marcel Vigneron"	August 6, 2014
Richard Blais (Top Chef: Chicago runner-up and Top Chef: All-Stars winner) vs. Marcel Vigneron (Top Chef: Los Angeles runner-up)
2	"**Shirley Chung** vs. Brooke Williamson"	August 13, 2014
Shirley Chung (Top Chef: New Orleans finalist) vs. Brooke Williamson (Top Chef: Seattle runner-up)
3	"Mike Isabella vs. **Antonia Lofaso**"	August 20, 2014
Mike Isabella (Top Chef: All-Stars runner-up) vs. Antonia Lofaso (Top Chef: Chicago finalist)
4	"**CJ Jacobson** vs. Stefan Richter"	August 27, 2014
CJ Jacobson (Top Chef: Miami contestant) vs. Stefan Richter (Top Chef: New York runner-up)
5	"David Burke vs. **Takashi Yagihashi**"	September 3, 2014
David Burke (Top Chef Masters season 5 contestant) vs. Takashi Yagihashi (Top Chef Masters season 4 contestant)
6	"**Dale Talde** vs. Tiffani Faison"	September 10, 2014
Tiffani Faison (Top Chef: San Francisco runner-up) vs. Dale Talde (Top Chef: Chicago and Top Chef: All-Stars contestant)
7	"**Jen Carroll** vs. Nyesha Arrington"	September 17, 2014
Nyesha Arrington (Top Chef: Texas contestant) vs. Jen Carroll (Top Chef: Las Vegas finalist)
8	"**Stephanie Izard** vs. Kristen Kish"	September 24, 2014
Stephanie Izard (Top Chef: Chicago winner) vs. Kristen Kish (Top Chef: Seattle winner)
9	"Art Smith vs. **Kevin Gillespie**"	October 1, 2014
Kevin Gillespie (Top Chef: Las Vegas fan favorite) vs. Art Smith (Top Chef Masters season 1 contestant)
10	"Finale"	October 8, 2014
