= Check, Please! =

Television series

Check, Please! is a multi-Emmy Award winning restaurant review program that began on Chicago's PBS member station WTTW in 2001.

The format of the show is simple: three people sit down with a host to discuss three local eating establishments, one favorite chosen by each guest. Before the program is taped, each person chooses a favorite restaurant, and everyone in the group is required to visit each person's selection. Afterwards, everyone describes their eating experiences. Although many participants select trendy, upscale restaurants, just about any eating establishment is fair game including hot dog stands and "neighborhood joints". More than 35,000 people have applied to be guests on Check, Please! in Chicago alone.

The show's initial popularity in Chicago inspired spin-offs in several other markets. A San Francisco Bay Area version of the show, Check, Please! Bay Area, began its first season in 2005, airing on KQED. A Miami, Fort Lauderdale and Palm Beach version for WPBS and WPBT, Check, Please! South Florida, debuted in January 2008. Check, Please! Kansas City then began airing on KCPT in 2009, and Check, Please! Arizona on Phoenix's KAET made its debut in 2010. A Seattle version, Check, Please! Northwest, began airing on KCTS in 2012. A Philadelphia version, Check, Please! Philly, debuted in January 2020 on WHYY-TV.

== Hosts ==
The first two seasons of the show in Chicago were hosted by Amanda Puck, who is Wolfgang Puck's former sister-in-law. In October 2003, Amanda Puck was replaced with Alpana Singh, who has worked as a sommelier at Chicago's Everest restaurant and as the Director of Wine and Spirits for Lettuce Entertain You Enterprises. In 2013, Singh stepped down and was replaced by Catherine De Orio, a food writer and former lawyer. In 2018, Singh returned as the show and replaced De Orio as the host. The Chicago version ended in 2021.

The San Francisco version is hosted by wine consultant and author Leslie Sbrocco. The Miami version is hosted by chef Michelle Bernstein. The Kansas City version is hosted by wine consultant and author Doug Frost. The Phoenix version was hosted by chef Robert McGrath, who was then replaced by chef Mark Tarbell in 2017. The Seattle version is hosted by urban gardener Amy Pennington. The Philadelphia version is hosted by food and travel writer Kae Lani Palmisano who received a 2020 Mid-Atlantic Emmy for Talent - Program Host/Moderator for hosting Check, Please! Philly in the show's first year.

== Producers ==
The concept was created by David Manilow and developed by Manilow and Joel Cohen. The executive producers are Manilow and V.J. McAleer. Manilow also oversees all operations of the show and the brand.

According to Manilow, the inspiration for creating the show came from a weekly dining club that he started and included Cohen and film director Joe Angio. The three would rotate selecting restaurants to visit, and each would try to outdo each other in selecting wild or exotic places.

== Lost episode ==
On January 16, 2009, a previously unaired August 2001 episode (Dixie Kitchen), which featured the then Illinois state senator Barack Obama, premiered on WTTW, days before his presidential inauguration.
