= Jennifer Biesty =

American chef

Jennifer Biesty is a chef and restaurateur (Shakewell+Oakland) who appeared on Top Chef: Chicago where she competed against her girlfriend Zoi Antonitsas.

== Biography ==
Biesty is a native of Brooklyn, New York. She studied at The Culinary Institute of America (CIA) and was one of their youngest students. She interned in New Orleans at the Sazerac.

== Career ==
After graduating from CIA, Biesty went to Manhattan to work with Marcus Samuelsson at Restaurant Aquavit. She then went to work with Loretta Keller in San Francisco and spent time in Europe working with various chefs.

After competing on Top Chef, Biesty was executive chef at Scala’s Bistro in the Sir Francis Drake Hotel.

Biesty also competed to Beat Bobby Flay and won on Chopped.
