= Dale Talde =

American chef (born 1978)

- Born: October 25, 1978 (age 47); Chicago, Illinois, US
- Spouse: Agnes Chung
- Culinary career
- Current restaurant: Goosefeather
- Television shows: Top Chef: Chicago; Top Chef: All-Stars

Dale Talde (born October 25, 1978, in Chicago, Illinois) is an American chef, television personality, and cookbook author, best known for competing on two seasons of the Bravo reality television cooking competition series Top Chef: Top Chef: Chicago in 2008 and Top Chef: All-Stars in 2010–11. Although Talde finished in sixth place in both Top Chef seasons, he has been called to guest-judge in the show several times, making him one of the show's most popular cast members. He has also hosted Tastemade's Up in My Grill, was the head judge in Knife Fight season 4, and guest-judged in Top Chef Amateurs, Chopped, Chopped Junior and Beat Bobby Flay. He has also been called to compete on Top Chef Duels, Celebrity Chopped and Iron Chef America. In 2022, Talde was nominated for a James Beard Award - Best Chef in New York. Talde is Filipino-American.

== Career ==
Talde's passion for cooking began at a young age in his native Chicago, where he learned to prepare meals alongside his mother in the kitchen. The proud son of Filipino immigrants, he grew up immersed in his family's cultural heritage while also enjoying the life of a typical American kid.

Talde applied this distinct Asian-American experience to the menu of his eponymous restaurant, TALDE, which opened in Brooklyn's Park Slope neighborhood in 2012. He opened a TALDE in Miami, Florida, and Jersey City, New Jersey. Talde debuted his first project in Manhattan with the opening of Massoni at the Arlo NoMad Hotel in November 2016. His second Manhattan restaurant, Rice & Gold, opened in October 2017 at the 50 Bowery Hotel in Chinatown. In Florida, Talde also had three locations in the Grandview Public Market food hall in West Palm Beach. They were called The Corner, Clare's, and Little Red Truck.

In 2018, Talde became business partners with his life partner Agnes. Talde and Agnes built foodcrushhospitality.com. They opened Goosefeather in 2019. Esquire magazine named Goosefeather best new restaurant for 2020. In 2022, Talde was nominated for a James Beard Award - Best Chef in New York.

In addition to his work in the kitchen, Talde is the host of Tastemade's All Up In My Grill. He was also a three-time chef contestant and judge on Bravo's Emmy Award-winning culinary show, Top Chef: he competed in Season 4, “All-Star” Season 8, and Top Chef Duels, becoming one of the show's most popular cast members. Talde has competed on Chopped, Iron Chef America, Knife Fight and was also head judge on Knife Fight Season 4, as well as guest judge on both Chopped and Beat Bobby Flay.

In September 2015, Grand Central Publishing released Talde's first cookbook, Asian American, to rave reviews.

== Personal life ==
In July 2018, Talde and his wife Agnes had a son.
