= Top Chef: Los Angeles =

Season 2 of American television series

- Season 2
- Hosted by: Padma Lakshmi
- Judges: Tom Colicchio; Gail Simmons
- No. of contestants: 15
- Winner: Ilan Hall
- Runner-up: Marcel Vigneron
- Location: Los Angeles, California
- Finals venue: Waikoloa Village, Hawaii
- Fan Favorite: Sam Talbot
- No. of episodes: 13

Release
- Original network: Bravo
- Original release: October 18, 2006 – January 31, 2007

Season chronology
- ← Previous; San Francisco Next → Miami

Top Chef: Los Angeles is the second season of the American reality television series Top Chef. It was first filmed in Los Angeles, before concluding in Waikoloa Village, Hawaii. The season premiered on October 18, 2006, and ended on January 31, 2007. Padma Lakshmi replaced Katie Lee Joel as the host, with Tom Colicchio and Gail Simmons returning as judges. The winning recipe from each week's episode was featured on Bravo's Top Chef website and prepared by Season 1 contestant Lee Anne Wong in a web video called The Wong Way to Cook. Bravo cited negative viewer reaction to the Season 2 chefs' attitudes and overall behavior as the reason why no reunion episode was filmed. In the season finale, Ilan Hall was declared the winner over runner-up Marcel Vigneron. Sam Talbot was voted Fan Favorite.

== Contestants ==
Fifteen chefs competed in Top Chef: Los Angeles.

Name	Hometown	Current Residence (Note: The contestants' city and state of residence during time of filming.)	Age
Elia Aboumrad	Mexico City, Mexico	Las Vegas, Nevada	23
Otto Borsich	Vermilion, Ohio	Las Vegas, Nevada	46
Marisa Churchill	San Francisco, California		28
Cliff Crooks	New York, New York	West Caldwell, New Jersey	28
Carlos Fernandez	Hoboken, New Jersey	Fort Lauderdale, Florida	36
Betty Fraser	San Francisco, California	Los Angeles, California	44
Mia Gaines-Alt	Oakland, California	Oakdale, California	32
Ilan Hall	Great Neck, New York	New York, New York	24
Michael Midgley	Stockton, California	Lodi, California	28
Josie Smith-Malave	Miami, Florida	Brooklyn, New York	31
Emily Sprissler	Washington, D.C.	Las Vegas, Nevada	30
Suyai Steinhauer	Oxford, England	New York, New York	29
Sam Talbot	Charlotte, North Carolina	New York, New York	28
Frank Terzoli	San Diego, California		39
Marcel Vigneron	Bainbridge Island, Washington	Las Vegas, Nevada	26

Marcel Vigneron and Elia Aboumrad returned to compete in Top Chef: All-Stars. Josie Smith-Malave returned for Top Chef: Seattle. Vigneron later competed in Top Chef Duels, and returned again for Top Chef: Colorado, competing in the Last Chance Kitchen. Sam Talbot returned for Top Chef: Charleston.

== Contestant progress ==
Episode #		1	2	3	4^{3}	5	6	7	8	9	10^{6}	11	12	13
Quickfire Challenge Winner(s)		Sam	Cliff	Cliff	Carlos	Sam	Cliff^{4} Frank^{4} Ilan^{4} Mia^{4} Sam^{4}	Marcel	Cliff	Michael^{1}	Sam^{1} Marcel^{1}	Sam^{1}	N/A	N/A
Contestant		Elimination Challenge Results												
1	Ilan	WIN	LOW	IN	IN	WIN	IN	IN	HIGH	LOW	IN	HIGH	LOW	WINNER
2	Marcel	LOW	LOW	IN	HIGH	IN	HIGH	IN	HIGH	LOW	IN	LOW	WIN	RUNNER-UP
3	Sam	IN	HIGH	HIGH	LOW	HIGH	IN	LOW	WIN	HIGH	LOW	HIGH	OUT	
3	Elia	HIGH	LOW	IN	IN	LOW	WIN	WIN	LOW	HIGH	IN	LOW	OUT	
5	Cliff	IN	LOW	HIGH	LOW	HIGH	IN	LOW	LOW	IN	LOW	DSQ^{7}		
6	Michael	IN	HIGH	LOW	LOW	HIGH	LOW	IN	LOW	WIN	OUT			
7	Betty	HIGH	WIN	WIN	HIGH	LOW	LOW	HIGH	HIGH	OUT				
8	Mia	HIGH	HIGH	IN	LOW	LOW	IN	HIGH	WDR^{5}					
9	Frank	IN	LOW	LOW	WIN	IN	IN	OUT						
10	Carlos	LOW	HIGH	IN	LOW	LOW	OUT							
11	Josie	IN	HIGH	IN	IN	OUT^{3}								
11	Marisa	IN	LOW	IN	LOW	OUT^{3}								
13	Emily	IN	HIGH	OUT										
14	Otto	LOW	WDR^{2}											
15	Suyai	OUT												

^Note 1: The chef(s) did not receive immunity for winning the Quickfire Challenge.
^Note 2: Otto voluntarily withdrew before Lakshmi eliminated anyone, deciding that his misconduct over the unpaid lychees contributed the most to his team's loss.
^Note 3: After allegations of cheating, the judges decided not to eliminate anyone. Consequently, two chefs were eliminated in the following episode.
^Note 4: There were five winners in the Quickfire Challenge. These winners did not compete in the Elimination Challenge.
^Note 5: Mia voluntarily withdrew before Lakshmi eliminated anyone, fearing Elia would be eliminated.
^Note 6: Following the Elimination Challenge, no winning team was declared. The Bottom 3 was decided based on each chef's individual performance.
^Note 7: Cliff was disqualified for aggressive physical contact with Marcel. No one else was eliminated going into the finale.

(WINNER) The chef won the season and was crowned "Top Chef".
(RUNNER-UP) The chef was a runner-up for the season.
(WIN) The chef won the Elimination Challenge.
(HIGH) The chef was selected as one of the top entries in the Elimination Challenge, but did not win.
(IN) The chef was not selected as one of the top or bottom entries in the Elimination Challenge and was safe.
(LOW) The chef was selected as one of the bottom entries in the Elimination Challenge, but was not eliminated.
(OUT) The chef lost the Elimination Challenge.
(WDR) The chef voluntarily withdrew from the competition.
(DSQ) The chef was disqualified from the competition.

== Episodes ==
No. overall	No. in season	Title	Original release date
13	1	"Into the Fire"	October 18, 2006
Quickfire Challenge: The chefs created flambé dishes in a limited amount of time. The winner received immunity from elimination. Season One champion Harold Dieterle was this season's first guest judge.: Winner: Sam (Espresso Shrimp Flambéed with Sambuca, Roasted Hazelnut & Peanut Paste); Elimination Challenge: The chefs were required to prepare a dish using the five ingredients provided in a mystery crate. The contestants were separated into two groups and received different crates. The teams took turns serving their dishes to the judges and the other group of contestants.: Orange Team: Carlos, Elia, Frank, Ilan, Marisa, Michael, Suyai; Black Team: Betty, Cliff, Emily, Josie, Marcel, Mia, Otto, Sam; Winner: Ilan (Baked Escargot in the Shell); Eliminated: Suyai (Braised Potatoes & Artichokes, Garlic Escargot with Cheese Sauce)
14	2	"Eastern Promise"	October 25, 2006
Quickfire Challenge: Each chef created a sushi dish in a limited amount of time. The winner received immunity from elimination.: Winner: Cliff (Hama Hama Oysters with Ginger, Soy, Mango & Jalapeño; Spot Prawns, Hamachi & Daikon Sushi); Elimination Challenge: The contestants were split into two teams: Team Vietnam and Team Korea. Each team had to prepare two dishes using the flavors of their assigned country to serve at a charity fundraiser for 1,000 people. The winner received a limited-edition Kyocera KT-300-HIP Kyotop 8.25" ceramic sashimi knife. Chef, restaurateur, and television personality Ming Tsai appeared as guest judge.: Team Vietnam: Betty, Carlos, Emily, Josie, Mia, Michael, Sam; Team Korea: Cliff, Elia, Frank, Ilan, Marcel, Marisa, Otto; Winner: Betty; Withdrew: Otto (Note: Otto voluntarily withdrew from the show. As Team Korea loaded up their SUV with groceries, Marisa overheard Otto saying that he thought the store cashier neglected to ring up a case of lychees. She later revealed this to Colicchio, who forced Otto to return them to the store. Otto returned to compete in the Elimination Challenge, but announced that he was withdrawing from the competition during the "Judges' Table" segment, citing the drama surrounding the incident as the primary reason for his team's loss.)
15	3	"Food for the People"	November 1, 2006
Quickfire Challenge: The chefs had to create an original ice cream flavor and serve it at the Redondo Beach Seaside Lagoon. The winner received immunity from elimination.: Winner: Cliff (Marshmallow with Cookies); Elimination Challenge: The chefs had to create a dish updating a "childhood classic" to fit the menu of T.G.I. Friday's that would be served to the firemen of South Pasadena. The winning entrée would be featured nationwide on the menu of T.G.I. Friday's.: Winner: Betty (Grilled Cheese with Portabello Mushrooms & Roasted Red Pepper Soup); Eliminated: Emily ("Super Slamming Surf & Turf")
16	4	"Less is More"	November 8, 2006
Quickfire Challenge: Each chef made an amuse-bouche dish using $10 of ingredients from a vending machine. The winner received immunity from elimination.: Winner: Carlos (Sunflower Seed & Carrot Loaf with Cilantro, Sesame Seeds & Squirt); Elimination Challenge: The 12 chefs were divided into four teams and were required to create a meal that did not exceed 500 calories (2,100 kJ) to serve at a camp for diabetic and overweight children. The winner received a cookbook written by guest judge Suzanne Goin and an opportunity to collaborate on one of Goin's famed Sunday supper menus for her Lucques restaurant.: Red Team: Marisa, Mia, Michael; Orange Team: Carlos, Cliff, Sam; Black Team: Betty, Frank, Marcel; White Team: Elia, Ilan, Josie; Winner: Frank (Sausage & Cheese Pizza); Eliminated: None (Note: At the judges' table, the losing teams made allegations regarding the "bending" or "breaking" of the rules in the Elimination Challenge by members of the winning team. Sam stated that he saw people excessively squirting bottles of olive oil, but refused to name anyone. Mia stated that Betty had used sugar instead of Splenda; a claim that Betty herself later confirmed, explaining that she thought she had not violated the rules because her team would still be under the 500 calories (2,100 kJ) limit. However, the other contestants understood that the rules required that once the calorie calculations had been completed by the nutritionists, the recipes could not be further modified. As a result, Colicchio stated that all the contestants would remain "on probation" and nobody was eliminated.)
17	5	"Social Service"	November 15, 2006
Quickfire Challenge: Each chef created a dish using offal, the leftover parts of animals.: Winner: Sam (Sweetbread & Scallion Beignets, Chinese Five Spice & Sweet Soy Broth); Elimination Challenge: Working in teams of two, the chefs had to create a six-course lunch for Jennifer Coolidge and 60 of her guests using only the ingredients that were already available in the kitchen. An opportunity to work with guest judge Michelle Bernstein at the Sagamore Hotel in Miami on the Food Network South Beach Wine and Food Festival.: First Course: Frank and Marcel; Second Course: Cliff and Sam; Third Course: Ilan and Michael; Fourth Course: Betty and Mia; Fifth Course: Josie and Marisa; Sixth Course: Elia and Carlos; Winner: Ilan (Lobster, Shrimp & Mushroom Paella, Fried Softshell Crab); Eliminated: Marisa, Josie (Prickly Pear & Coconut Soup, Fennel & Apple Salad, Sautéed Pineapple Salad)
18	6	"Thanksgiving"	November 22, 2006
Quickfire Challenge: The remaining chefs created dishes using three different canned foods in 15 minutes. The winners of the challenge were able to skip the Elimination Challenge altogether.: Winners: Sam (Garbanzo & Beet Salad, Crunchy Anchovies with Lemon Dijon Vinaigrette); Mia (15 Minute Salad with Garbanzo Beans, Green Beans, Artichoke Hearts & Mint); Ilan (Spinach & Cannellini Bean Salad, Roasted Potatoes & Vienna Sausages); Cliff (Potato Salad, Anchovies & Mandarin Oranges); Frank (Fruit & Coconut Salad with Blueberry Yogurt Cream); Elimination Challenge: The five chefs who did not win the Quickfire Challenge (Marcel, Elia, Michael, Betty, and Carlos) worked together to make a cutting edge Thanksgiving dinner for the judges, guest judge Anthony Bourdain, and the other Top Chef contestants, using the kitchens in the loft.: Winner: Elia (Portobello & Button Mushroom Creme with Walnuts); Eliminated: Carlos (Salad with Chipotle Peppers, Queso Fresco, Pumpkin Seeds, Butternut Squash Dressing)
19	7	"The Raw and the Cooked"	December 6, 2006
Quickfire Challenge: The chefs had to create an entrée using fresh ingredients from the Redondo Beach Farmers' Market without cooking of any kind. The winner received immunity from elimination.: Winner: Marcel (Watermelon & Tomato Trio: Watermelon Steak, Tomato Carpaccio, Nasturtiums & Opal Basil); Elimination Challenge: The chefs were told by Lakshmi that they had to prepare breakfast for athletes. The cooking environment and available tools were unknown to the contestants until their arrival at the challenge. In the challenge, the chefs cooked for surfers at dawn on the beach using only a fire pit and basic kitchen tools. Rafael Lunetta guest judges.: Winner: Elia ("Organic Breakfast, Lunch and Dinner": Waffle with Ham, Cheese & Fried Eggs); Eliminated: Frank (Zucchini & Salmon Scramble, Cannoli Cream with Strawberries & Holland Waffle)
20	8	"Holiday Spirit"	December 13, 2006
Quickfire Challenge: The chefs made a Bailey's Irish Cream mix drink and an accompanying dish. The winner received immunity from elimination. Mixologist and owner of Culinary Cocktail Catering, Kristin Woodward, was the guest judge.: Winner: Cliff (Original Bailey's, Rum, Vodka & Vanilla Bean Cocktail; Steak Tapas, Creme Fraiche Fondue, Nutmeg & Dark Chocolate); Elimination Challenge: Working in two teams of four, the chefs catered the Los Angeles magazine holiday party at the Warner Bros. movie lot. The winner received a 20-piece set of Global knives. Ted Allen guest judges.: Black Team: Cliff, Elia, Mia, Michael; Orange Team: Betty, Ilan, Marcel, Sam; Winner: Sam; Withdrew: Mia (Note: Mia voluntarily withdrew from the competition during the judges' table segment, believing that she was saving Elia from elimination.)
21	9	"Seven"	January 3, 2007
Quickfire Challenge: Each chef drew a knife that showed a different color. The chefs then had to create a dish based on the color drawn from the knife block. From this point on, the winner of the Quickfire Challenge no longer received immunity from elimination.: Winner: Michael (Orange: Sushi Rice with Salmon & Carrot Chips); Elimination Challenge: The chefs prepared a seven-course meal, with each course representing one of the Seven Deadly Sins. The sins were drawn from the knife block, but Michael, as the Quickfire winner, was given the opportunity to swap his sin, Lust, for Marcel's Envy. Debi Mazar made a guest appearance, and her favorite chef in Los Angeles, Roberto Ivan, appeared as the guest judge in addition to Ted Allen.: Winner: Michael (Envy: Trout & Salmon with Lemon-Thyme Beurre Blanc, Asparagus & Mushrooms); Eliminated: Betty (Sloth: Trio of Slow Roasted Soups: Carrot Fennel, Sweet White Onion, Beet & Red Pepper)
22	10	"Unhappy Customers"	January 10, 2007
Quickfire Challenge: The chefs had 30 minutes to create snacks using three Kraft Foods products: mayonnaise, barbecue sauce or Italian dressing.: Winners: Sam (Southern Kraft Sandwich with Tempura Shrimp, Pickled Peaches & BBQ Aioli); Marcel (Lamb Kebab with Curried Kraft Mayo, Endives & Tomatoes); Elimination Challenge: Similar to the standard Restaurant Wars format, the contestants, divided into two teams, devised a concept, interior design, and menu for a raw restaurant space. Sam and Marcel, as the Quickfire winners, chose their teammates. Mike Yakura guest judges both challenges.: Lalalina: Sam, Michael, Ilan (FOH); First Course: Fried Meatball on Crostini with Parsley Pesto; Second Course: Linguini with Walnut Parsley Pesto & Roasted Mushrooms; Third Course: Roasted Pork Loin, Bacon Roasted Brussels Sprouts & Creamy Polenta; Fourth Course: Watermelon "Gnocchi" with Cabrales & Asiago Cream; M.E.C.: Marcel, Elia, Cliff (FOH); First Course: Barbecue Coffee Chicken Wing; Second Course: Tempura Vegetables & Mozzarella with Cornichon Aioli; Third Course: "The M.E.C. Burger" with House Made Chips; Fourth Course: Oreo Lemon Pie; Eliminated: Michael
23	11	"Sense and Sensuality"	January 17, 2007
Quickfire Challenge: The chefs had to prepare a dish using Nestlé chocolatier products.: Winner: Sam (Shrimp & Banana with Chocolate Chipotle, Black Bean & Cilantro Pesto Sauces); Elimination Challenge: The chefs worked together to create a romantic five-course menu for celebratory couples in Santa Barbara. Sam, as the Quickfire Challenge winner, was allowed to choose which course he wanted to execute and which proteins he was going to use. The remaining contestants were not allowed to use the same proteins that Sam chose. Sam elected to cook the first course and use lobster and scallops as his proteins. Éric Ripert guest judges.: Disqualified: Cliff (Sirloin with Lentil Purée) (Note: After the Elimination Challenge, but before the Judges' Table segment, Cliff, Elia, Ilan and Sam got drunk and decided to forcibly shave Marcel's head. Cliff approached a sleeping Marcel and wrestled him to the ground. Marcel freed himself from Cliff's hold and slept in a bathroom. Ilan videotaped the incident with a video camera borrowed from production and could be heard in the recording encouraging the other contestants to use the clippers on Marcel. This sequence showed Ilan and Elia shaving their heads before deciding to shave Marcel's. However, the editing is misleading as Elia is shown briefly with a full head of hair in the background as Cliff wrestled Marcel. The next day, Cliff was disqualified from the competition, as the show's rules explicitly forbid contestants from touching one another in an aggressive manner. However, it was mentioned that during the judges' deliberation that Cliff's dish was the weakest of all five, and that he likely would have been eliminated at the Judges' Table anyway. Colicchio stated in his blog post for the episode that he was willing to send home all of the contestants involved except for Marcel, holding them all accountable either for their actions that escalated the situation, or their decision not to speak up for Marcel while he was calling for help. However, the producers intervened, not wanting to end the season on a sour note and give audiences an anticlimactic ending giving the title of Top Chef to Marcel by default.)
24	12	"Hawaii Finale, Part 1"	January 24, 2007
Elimination Challenge: Each chef made two dishes based on classic Hawaiian dishes, with a twist. They were required to combine their signature style with traditional Hawaiian flavors and cuisine, served at a birthday luau for guest judge and Hawaiian cuisine champion Alan Wong.: Winners: Marcel (Hamachi Poke with Pineapple Poi; Salmon Lomi Lomi with Tomato Foam, Scallion Oil, Chili Water & Lotus Root Chip); Ilan (Morcilla & Squid Laulau; Saffron Haupia Frita).; Eliminated: Sam (Opakapaka Poke with Sea Beans; Mascarpone Mousse with Hawaiian Salted Coconut Milk & Citrus Tuile); Elia (Snapper Steamed in Ti Leaves; Ahi Poke with Olives, Capers & Lemon Confit)
25	13	"Hawaii Finale, Part 2"	January 31, 2007
Elimination Challenge: The chefs prepared a five-course meal to be served to the usual judges' panel and five additional guest judges at one of two restaurants in the Hilton Waikoloa Village. Ilan cooked at Donatoni's Restaurant, while Marcel cooked at Imari Restaurant. Previously eliminated contestants Sam, Elia, Michael, Betty, Mia, and Frank were asked to return as potential sous chefs for Ilan and Marcel. Each returnee was asked which finalist they would prefer to work with. Elia, Michael, and Betty chose Ilan. Sam, Mia, and Frank chose Marcel. Ilan and Marcel were then allowed to choose two chefs. Marcel chose Sam and Michael, and Ilan chose Elia and Betty. Guest judging are Michelle Bernstein, Scott Conant, Wylie Dufresne, Hubert Keller, and Roy Yamaguchi.: Ilan: First Course: Pincho of Pan Con Tomate with Angulas, Osetra Caviar & Tomatillos; Second Course: Macadamia Nut Gazpacho with Pan Roasted Moi; Third Course: Seared Squab with Foie Gras, Shrimp, Braised Leeks & Lobster Sauce; Fourth Course: Braised & Grilled Beef Short Rib with Mushrooms & Romesco Sauce; Fifth Course: Tangelo Soup with Hawaiian Fruit, Surinam Cherry Sorbet & Bay Leaf Fritter; Marcel: First Course: Sea Urchin & Meyer Lemon Gelee with Fennel Cream, Caviar & Kalamata Oil; Second Course: Cucumber & Radish Salad with Citrus Yuzu Vinaigrette; Third Course: Hearts of Palm & Maitake Mushrooms with Kaffir Lime Sauce & Sea Beans; Fourth Course: North Short Strip Loin with Garlic Purée, Crispy Taro Ball & Micro Greens; Fifth Course: Blini with Kona Coffee Caviar & Hawaiian Chocolate Mousse; Winner: Ilan; Runner-up: Marcel
