= Hung Huynh =

Vietnamese-American chef

- Born: January 25, 1978 (age 48); Ho Chi Minh City, Vietnam
- Education: The Culinary Institute of America
- Occupation: Chef
- Years active: 2002–present
- Television: Beat Bobby Flay (season 10 EP. 07); Top Chef: Miami
- Website: chefhunghuynh.com

Hung Huynh (born January 25, 1978) is a Vietnamese-born American chef, best known as the winner of the third season of Top Chef, a reality cooking competition series on Bravo. He was the Executive Chef at Catch, The General, and Catch Miami.

== Early life and career ==
Born in Vietnam, Huynh was raised in Pittsfield, Massachusetts and began his culinary training as a young boy in his immigrant parents' Vietnamese restaurant. He is openly bisexual. He has a degree from the Culinary Institute of America; he cooked at restaurants including Per Se and Gilt in NYC, and at the time of season three Top Chef's airing, he was the executive sous chef at the Guy Savoy restaurant in Las Vegas.

Huynh also served as a guest judge in episode 12 of season four and in the quickfire challenge of the eighth episode of season five of Top Chef. Huynh appeared in September 2010 on the finale of season seven of Top Chef and assisted Angelo Sosa as his sous chef.

Huynh participated in the 2008 Bocuse d'Or USA culinary contest, competing to represent the U.S. in the 2009 international Bocuse d'Or. Although Huynh won the "Best Fish Award," the gold medal was awarded to Timothy Hollingsworth.

From the spring of 2008 through August 2009, Huynh was the guest executive chef at Solo restaurant in New York City. From August 2009 through late 2011, he was the executive chef of Ajna Bar (formerly Buddha Bar) in New York City.

Huynh opened The General, Catch, and Catch Miami with the EMM Group. The General showcases modern Asian fare, while Catch features mainly seafood. In February 2015, he cut ties with EMM, citing creative differences. After hosting a series of pop-up events in 2016 and consulting for various restaurants, Huynh took the position of chef de cuisine at Morimoto Asia in Disney Springs in January 2018. He left the position in November 2018.

Later in 2018, Huynh joined Earl Enterprises, the parent company of Planet Hollywood, as a Partner of Asian Concepts. He helped open and was a chef/partner at Warrior, an Asian-fusion restaurant and lounge on the Sunset Strip in West Hollywood, California. He also helped to launch and develop the fast-casual concept Asian Street Eats by Chef Hung Huynh, which is inspired by flavors from street vendors throughout Asia. Locations were opened in early 2020 in Downtown Disney and at Los Angeles International Airport. The Disneyland outpost closed just a year later in January 2021. Huynh was no longer employed by Earl Enterprises as of December 2020.

In July 2021, Huynh was hired as executive chef at a new pan-Mediterranean restaurant, Ava MediterrAegean in Winter Park, Florida. However, he left the project in December 2021 before the restaurant opening to the public.

In March 2022, Huynh signed on as the new Director of Culinary Innovation for Orlando-based Omei Restaurant Group.
