= Elia Aboumrad =

Mexican chef and Top Chef contestant

- Born: Mexico City, Mexico
- Culinary career
- Current restaurants
- Boom Bang Fine Foods & Cocktails
- Television shows
- Top Chef: Los Angeles (2006); Top Chef: All-Stars (2011); 24 in 24: Last Chef Standing (2025)

Elia Aboumrad (born in Mexico City, Mexico) is a Mexican chef and former Top Chef contestant.

== Biography ==
Aboumrad studied at Ecole Lenôtre. After earning Le Cordon Bleu's 'Grand Diplôme', Aboumrad went on to work under Joël Robuchon in Paris. After several years of training and service, she became his first female Sous Chef. She then moved to Las Vegas to open his restaurants at the MGM Grand Hotel. Later, she was recruited as executive chef of The Café at The Hotel at Mandalay Bay. The Hotel garnered its fourth AAA Diamond under her regime.

Aboumrad appeared on reality TV show Top Chef on Bravo during its second season and was one of the final four contestants when she was eliminated from the competition. In 2009, she was awarded the internationally recognized 'Universal Excellency Award' for her dedication to the culinary arts. Aboumrad also competed as a contestant on Top Chef: All Stars in 2010, but she was eliminated in the first episode.

In September 2012, Aboumrad and Uyen Nguyen opened GORGE, a charcuterie house and wine bar, on the famous Sunset Strip in West Hollywood, California. She re-opened Cassell's Hamburgers with Christian Page and Jingbo Lou.

In November 2021, Aboumrad opened Boom Bang Fine Foods & Cocktails in the Green Valley area of Henderson, Nevada, with partners Christian Page and Tony Angotti.

Elia Aboumrad competed on Food Network's 2025 show 24 in 24: Last Chef Standing season 2 before being eliminated during Shift 5, Challenge 15 ("Cooking Without Gas"). She won the Golden Knife in Shift 3 and Shift 4.

== Personal life ==
Aboumrad is Mexican and of Lebanese heritage.
