= Top Chef: San Francisco =

Season 1 of American television series

- Season 1
- Hosted by: Katie Lee Joel
- Judges: Tom Colicchio; Gail Simmons
- No. of contestants: 12
- Winner: Harold Dieterle
- Runner-up: Tiffani Faison
- Location: San Francisco, California
- Finals venue: Las Vegas, Nevada
- No. of episodes: 12

Release
- Original network: Bravo
- Original release: March 8 – May 24, 2006

Season chronology
- Next → Los Angeles

Top Chef: San Francisco, originally titled simply as Top Chef, is the first season of the American reality television series Top Chef. It was first filmed in San Francisco, California, before concluding in Las Vegas, Nevada. The season premiered on March 8, 2006, and ended on May 24, 2006. The show featured chefs from around the United States living together in one house and competing in a series of culinary challenges. The prizes for the winner of the competition included a feature in Food & Wine Magazine, a showcase at the annual Food & Wine Classic in Aspen, Colorado, a Kenmore Elite kitchen set, and US$100,000. The series was hosted by Katie Lee Joel, in her only season as host, and judged by chef Tom Colicchio and food writer Gail Simmons. In the season finale, Harold Dieterle was declared the winner over runner-up Tiffani Faison.

== Contestants ==
Twelve chefs competed in Top Chef: San Francisco.

Name	Current Residence (Note: The contestants' city and state of residence during time of filming.)	Age
Stephen Asprinio	Las Vegas, Nevada	24
Andrea Beaman	New York, New York	38
Harold Dieterle	New York, New York	28
Tiffani Faison	Las Vegas, Nevada	28
Brian Hill	Los Angeles, California	37
Candice Kumai	Pasadena, California	23
Ken Lee	Los Angeles, California	34
Dave Martin	Long Beach, California	40
Miguel Morales	New York, New York	27
Lisa Parks	Los Angeles, California	45
Cynthia Sestito	East Hampton, New York	52
Lee Anne Wong	New York, New York	28

Tiffani Faison and Stephen Asprinio returned to compete in Top Chef: All-Stars. Faison later competed in Top Chef Duels. Lee Anne Wong returned for Top Chef: Colorado, competing in the Last Chance Kitchen, and Top Chef: All-Stars L.A.

== Contestant progress ==
Episode #		1	2	3	4	5	6	7	8^{3}	9	11	12
Quickfire Challenge Winner(s)		Lee Anne	Stephen	Tiffani	Lee Anne	Andrea	Stephen	Harold^{1}	Lee Anne^{1}	Harold^{1}	N/A	N/A
Contestant		Elimination Challenge Results										
1	Harold	WIN	IN	LOW	HIGH	LOW	IN	HIGH	IN	HIGH	WIN	WINNER
2	Tiffani	HIGH	IN	LOW	WIN	WIN	HIGH	HIGH	IN	IN	LOW	RUNNER-UP
3	Dave	IN	LOW	LOW	IN	WIN	LOW	WIN	IN	WIN	OUT	
4	Lee Anne	IN	IN	LOW	IN	HIGH	WIN	LOW	IN	OUT		
5	Stephen	HIGH	HIGH	WIN	LOW	HIGH	HIGH	LOW	OUT			
6	Miguel	IN	WIN	WIN	IN	LOW	LOW	OUT				
7	Andrea	LOW	OUT	WIN^{2}	HIGH	LOW	OUT					
8	Lisa	IN	LOW	WIN	LOW	OUT						
9	Candice	LOW	IN	WIN	OUT							
10	Brian	IN	HIGH	OUT								
11	Cynthia	IN	LOW	WDR^{2}								
12	Ken	OUT										

^Note 1: The chef(s) did not receive immunity for winning the Quickfire Challenge.
^Note 2: Cynthia voluntarily withdrew from the competition due to her father's illness. As a result, Andrea was reinstated into the competition.
^Note 3: The judges did not feel that anyone had distinguished themselves in the Elimination Challenge, so no winner was named.

(WINNER) The chef won the season and was crowned "Top Chef".
(RUNNER-UP) The chef was a runner-up for the season.
(WIN) The chef won the Elimination Challenge.
(HIGH) The chef was selected as one of the top entries in the Elimination Challenge but did not win.
(IN) The chef was not selected as one of the top or bottom entries in the Elimination Challenge and was safe.
(LOW) The chef was selected as one of the bottom entries in the Elimination Challenge but was not eliminated.
(OUT) The chef lost the Elimination Challenge.
(WDR) The chef voluntarily withdrew from the competition.

== Episodes ==
No. overall	No. in season	Title	Original release date
1	1	"Who Deserves to Be Here?"	March 8, 2006
Quickfire Challenge: The chefs had to survive working the line at chef Hubert Keller's restaurant, Fleur de Lys, for 30 minutes. The winner, determined by Keller, received immunity from elimination.: Winner: Lee Anne; Elimination Challenge: The chefs had to prepare a signature dish to be served to the judges and the other Top Chef contestants. Hubert Keller reappeared as a guest judge.: Winner: Harold (Steamed Thai Snapper); Eliminated: Ken (Pan-Seared Alaskan Halibut)
2	2	"Food of Love"	March 15, 2006
Quickfire Challenge: The chefs chose from a large selection of fruit to prepare a plate judged solely on presentation. The winner received immunity from elimination. The guest judge for the episode was chef Elizabeth Falkner.: Winner: Stephen; Elimination Challenge: The chefs had to make a sexy dessert for a fetish party at Mr. S, a sex boutique in San Francisco, for 50 guests, including drag queen RuPaul.: Winner: Miguel ("The Total Orgasm": Pastry Puffs, Tapioca Pillows, Hot Chocolate Shot); Eliminated: Andrea ("Creamy Balls & Crunchy Nuts": Chocolate Peanut Butter Balls, Chocolate Almond Flowers, Almonds)
3	3	"Nasty Delights"	March 22, 2006
Quickfire Challenge: The chefs were given one hour to prepare octopus. The winner received immunity from elimination. The guest judge for the episode was chef Laurent Manrique.: Winner: Tiffani (Red Wine-Braised Angel Hair Pasta with Cold Octopus); Withdrew: Cynthia (Octopus with Tarragon Whiskey Sauce) (Note: Cynthia chose to leave the show following the Quickfire Challenge to be with her sick father, who was battling cancer. Andrea was then brought back to keep an even number of contestants for the following Elimination Challenge.); Elimination Challenge: Working in two teams, the chefs prepared monkfish for a group of children at the Boys & Girls Club, who would rate the food.: Red Team: Andrea, Candice, Lisa, Miguel, Stephen; Blue Team: Brian, Dave, Harold, Lee Anne, Tiffani; Winner: Red Team; Eliminated: Brian
4	4	"Food on the Fly"	March 29, 2006
Quickfire Challenge: The chefs created dishes in 30 minutes using $20 worth of ingredients from a gas station store. The winner received immunity from elimination. The guest judge for the episode was chef Jefferson Hill.: Winner: Lee Anne (Funyuns-Battered Spiedini); Elimination Challenge: Each chef created a gourmet entrée that could be reheated in a microwave. They then presented their dishes to a group of women from the Junior League of Oakland-East Bay, who would rate their meals.: Winner: Tiffani (Mirin-Glazed Sea Bass); Eliminated: Candice (Shrimp & Spinach Quiche)
5	5	"Blind Confusion"	April 5, 2006
Quickfire Challenge: The chefs competed in a blindfolded taste test, where they were given five minutes to identify as many ingredients as possible. The winner received immunity from elimination. The guest judge for the episode was chef Mike Yakura.: Winner: Andrea; Elimination Challenge: Working in teams of two, the chefs created street food fusing Latin American cuisine with one other ethnic cuisine. After a random knife draw, Dave and Tiffani were assigned Moroccan, Andrea and Miguel were assigned Indian, Lee Anne and Stephen were assigned Chinese, and Harold and Lisa were assigned Japanese. The teams had to distribute their dish from a cart in the Mission District of San Francisco.: Winners: Dave, Tiffani (Moroccan Cubano Pork Sandwich); Eliminated: Lisa (Seared Tuna Avocado Salad)
6	6	"Guess Who's Coming to Dinner"	April 12, 2006
Quickfire Challenge: The chefs had 20 minutes to create an appetizer using $3 worth of ingredients, priced by the ounce. The guest judge for the episode was television host and author Ted Allen.: Winner: Stephen (Poached Baby Manila Clams over Grilled Sea Beans); Elimination Challenge: The chefs had to create a seven-course dinner party for Ted Allen to celebrate the launch of his latest cookbook. At first, each chef was able to choose which course they wanted to execute. However, the producers later introduced a random knife draw, forcing each chef to work on another contestant's recipe.: Winner: Lee Anne (Tiffani's Dish: Duck Breast with Fig-Stuffed Gnocchi); Eliminated: Andrea (Miguel's Dish: Smoked Scallops & Caviar on a Latke)
7	7	"Restaurant Wars"	April 19, 2006
Quickfire Challenge: Each chef was asked to make an original sandwich in 30 minutes using any of the available ingredients. The winning sandwich would be on the menu at the San Francisco location of Tom Colicchio's 'wichcraft restaurant. From this point forward, immunity from elimination was no longer available as a reward.: Winner: Harold (Mortadella Dandelion Sandwich); Elimination Challenge: Working in two teams of three, the chefs had 24 hours to transform an empty restaurant space into a pop-up restaurant. The teams were responsible for their restaurants' decor and menu. The guest diners chose which restaurant to attend and rated them based on food, atmosphere, and overall experience, which determined the winning and losing teams. The guest judge for the challenge was restaurateur and financier Jeffrey Chodorow. The winner received the opportunity to accompany Chodorow and his associates to the Cannes Film Festival in France.: Sabor: Lee Anne, Miguel, Stephen (FOH); Appetizer: Tapas Trio: White Gazpacho, Boquerones, Prosciutto-Wrapped Stuffed Fig; Entrée: Pan-Seared Snapper on Breaded Risotto Paella Cake; Dessert: Olive Oil Ice Cream; American Workshop: Dave (FOH), Harold, Tiffani; Appetizer: Tuna Tartare with Pita Chips; Entrée: Roast Chicken with Fall Vegetables & Natural Jus; Dessert: Fruit Crisp; Winner: Dave; Eliminated: Miguel
8	8	"Wedding Bell Blues"	April 26, 2006
Quickfire Challenge: The chefs had 90 minutes to design a wedding reception menu and pitch it to the couple. The winner's menu would be used for the upcoming Elimination Challenge.: Winner: Lee Anne; Elimination Challenge: Working as a team, the chefs were required to cater a wedding reception for 100 guests using the menu chosen in the Quickfire Challenge; however, the team had less than a day to prepare. The guest judge for the challenge was wedding planner Marcy Blum.: Canapé: Crispy Prawn Toast, Crab Meat with Pita Chips; Amuse-bouche: Lobster Hamuraki, Glazed Oysters, Yazu-Marinated Roe, Crab Soup Dumplings; First Course: Seared Salmon Salad, Thai Green Papaya, Lime & Chili Vinaigrette; Second Course: "The Lover's Nest": Seafood & Fresh Vegetables, Potato Taro Root Basket, Mango & Coconut; Third Course: Peking-Style Beef, Crispy Scallion Pancakes, Cucumber Salad; Wedding Cake: Passion Fruit & Ginger-Scented Cake, White Chocolate Butter Cream; Truffles: Milk Chocolate & Sesame, White Chocolate & Sake, Dark Chocolate & Ginger; Eliminated: Stephen
9	9	"Napa's Finest"	May 3, 2006
Quickfire Challenge: The chefs were asked to recreate a classic junk food element into a gourmet dish in 45 minutes. The winner's performance counted in the overall assessment of the week's challenges. The winner also received a bottle of Shafer Hillside Select Cabernet Sauvignon.: Winner: Harold (Popcorn Cakes with Ecuadorian Shrimp Ceviche); Elimination Challenge: The remaining chefs traveled to the Napa Valley's Copia museum to prepare a dish incorporating expensive black Périgord truffles to be served with 2001 Shafer Hillside Select Cabernet Sauvignon wine. The dishes were served to a group of top professional chefs from Northern California, including Douglas Keane, Cindy Pawlcyn, Philippe Jeanty, Lissa Doumani, Hiro Sone, Greg Cole, James McDevitt, Keith Luce, and Victor Scargle, alongside the founder of Shafer Vineyards, John Shafer.: Winner: Dave (Truffle & Cognac Cream Macaroni & Cheese, Filet of Beef, Collard Greens & Radicchio); Eliminated: Lee Anne (Butternut Squash & Truffle Risotto, Braised Treviso & Mushrooms, Crusted Lamb Loin)
10	10	"Reunion"	May 10, 2006
11	11	"Vegas Finale - Part 1"	May 17, 2006
Quickfire/Elimination Challenge: The three finalists met at the MGM Grand in Las Vegas, Nevada, where they competed in a series of three elimination-style Quickfire Challenges to determine which two chefs would remain to compete in a final challenge for the grand prize. For each challenge, the chefs had to prepare hotel room service meals in 30 minutes for different customers: first, a room of high rollers, including eliminated competitors Lee Anne, Miguel, and Stephen; then, a table of poker players, including Phil Hellmuth; lastly, performers from Cirque du Soleil. Each group of patrons decided on their favorite dish. The three groups' favorites were taken into consideration during the judging process. The guest judge for the challenge was chef Hubert Keller.: Winners: Harold, Tiffani; Eliminated: Dave
12	12	"Vegas Finale - Part 2"	May 24, 2006
Elimination Challenge: The two finalists each prepared a five-course tasting meal to be served to a table of luminaries from the culinary world. Each finalist was also assisted by two sous chefs, consisting of the four most recently eliminated contestants: Dave, Lee Anne, Stephen, and Miguel. Harold was assisted by Lee Anne and Miguel, while Tiffani was assisted by Stephen and Dave. Though not required, Tiffani chose to make two preparations of each course. The guest judges for the challenge were actress Lorraine Bracco, Food & Wine editor-in-chief Dana Cowin, restaurateur Drew Nieporent, and chefs Hubert Keller and Michael Mina.: Harold: First Course: Seared Diver Scallop with Blood Orange & Fennel Salad; Second Course: Olive Oil-Poached Bass; Third Course: Pan-Roasted Quail with Herb Spaetzle, Cherries & Foie Gras; Fourth Course: Duo of Beef with Kobe Beef & Braised Short Ribs; Fifth Course: Fig Tart with Cheeses; Tiffani: First Course: Seared Diver Scallop on Squid Ink; Scallop Crudo with Citrus; Second Course: Artichoke Risotto with Porketta; Crispy Artichokes with Dipping Sauce; Third Course: Steamed Branzino with Ratatouille; Crispy Branzino with Black Olive Pappardelle; Fourth Course: Saltimbocca with Primitivo Glace; Veal with Minted Peas & Spinach Crema; Fifth Course: Bread Pudding with Rum Cocktail; Vanilla Panna Cotta with Amaretto Cocktail; Winner: Harold; Runner-up: Tiffani
