= Stephen Asprinio =

American chef and restaurateur

- Born: Palm Beach County, Florida, U.S.
- Culinary career
- Television show(s): Top Chef: San Francisco; Top Chef: All-Stars

Stephen Asprinio (born in Palm Beach County, Florida) is an American restaurateur, sommelier, chef, and former Top Chef contestant.

== Biography ==
Asprinio studied at the Culinary Institute of America. He continued his education after culinary school and earned his bachelor's degree from the Cornell University School of Hotel Administration. He also studied and trained at Hermann J. Wiemer Vineyard.

Asprinio appeared on reality TV show Top Chef on Bravo during its first season and was one of the final five contestants when he was eliminated from the competition. Asprinio also competed as a contestant on Top Chef: All Stars in 2010, but he was eliminated in the third episode. Asprinio is best known as the "villain" of Top Chef's first season; ABC named him one of "Reality TV's Top 15 Meanest Villains." One of the starkest examples of this "villain" behaviour was Asprinio's ongoing verbal treatment of another contestant, Candice Kumai, whom he allegedly called "trash."

At the age of 26, Stephen Asprinio opened his first and namesake restaurant, Forté di Asprinio in South Florida, which was named "One of the Top 10 Best New Restaurants in the United States" by the Gayot Restaurant Guide. However, he left soon after its opening; the restaurant changed course and dropped “di Asprinio” from the name.

Asprinio currently resides in New York City, where his hospitality firm, S.A. Hospitality Innovations, is based.
