= Dana Cowin =

American editor & author

Dana Cowin is an American editor, author, and radio show host, best known for her two decades as the Editor-in-Chief of Food & Wine. During her tenure at the magazine (1995-2016), she expanded and introduced the magazine's annual Best New Chefs award and Most Innovative Women in Food & Drink. After Food & Wine, Cowin joined the restaurant group Chefs Club as a scout, selecting chefs from around the world to be featured on their curated menus. Cowin moved on to launch DBC Creative, a branding consultancy, and to become the host of “Speaking Broadly” on Heritage Radio Network, interviewing women in the food industry about their greatest challenges and triumphs.

Cowin has been a judge on Bravo’s Top Chef, a presenter at TedXManhattan, and a lecturer at the Food & Wine Classic and other food festivals. In 2014, Cowin published Mastering My Mistakes in the Kitchen: Learning to Cook with 65 Great Chefs and Over 100 Delicious Recipes. Cowin serves on the Board of Directors of City Harvest, a hunger-relief organization, and Hot Bread Kitchen, a workforce development group. Cowin was inducted into the James Beard Foundation's Who’s Who of Food & Beverage in America for her contributions to the culinary world in 2012.

Cowin graduated from Brown University. She is married to Barclay Livingstone Palmer and resides in New York City with her husband and two children.
