= Ilan Hall =

American chef

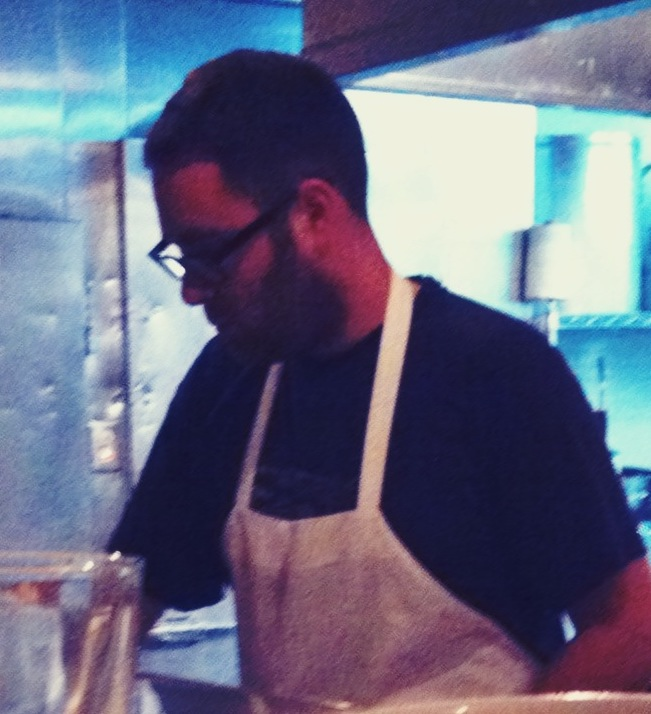
- Ilan Hall in the kitchen at the Gorbels in 2010.
- Born: Ilan D. Hall; Great Neck, New York, U.S.
- Education: Culinary Institute of America
- Culinary career
- Cooking style: Spanish, Israeli, Fusion
- Current restaurant(s): Ramen Hood, Los Angeles (2015–present)
- Previous restaurants: The Gorbals, Los Angeles (2009–2014), The Gorbals, Williamsburg, Brooklyn (2014–2015), ESH, Williamsburg, Brooklyn (2014–2016), Casa Mono, New York City (2006–?)
- Television shows: Top Chef, Knife Fight

Ilan D. Hall is an American chef, television personality, and restaurateur. He won the second season of Top Chef, and is owner-chef of Ramen Hood in Los Angeles.

== Early life and education ==
Hall is a native of Great Neck, New York. His parents were both immigrants: his father from Glasgow, Scotland, and his mother from Israel. Both his parents were from Jewish families.

As a teenager, Hall worked at Marine Fishery, a seafood store in his hometown of Great Neck and was later trained at Italy's Lorenzo de' Medici Apicus Program, and at the Culinary Institute of America (CIA).

== Career ==
In 2007, Hall won season two of Top Chef. Ilan was a line cook at Casa Mono, a Spanish restaurant in Manhattan. He had a rivalry with Marcel Vigneron during the show, with whom he attended culinary school simultaneously. Bravo ranked "The Head Shaving Incident" involving Hall and Vigneron as "probably the biggest scandal in Top Chef history."

In August 2009, he opened his first restaurant, The Gorbals, in downtown Los Angeles. Less than a week after opening, The county health department shut down The Gorbals because of an inadequate water heater. It reopened on October 23, 2009, but then permanently closed in 2014.

In 2014, Hall opened a second iteration of The Gorbals restaurant in Williamsburg, Brooklyn. He redesigned the menu with an Israeli barbecue concept in 2015 and renamed the restaurant ESH, the Hebrew word for fire. ESH closed in September 2016.

Hall opened Ramen Hood in Los Angeles at Grand Central Market in 2015.

Hall hosted Knife Fight, a cooking competition show on the Esquire Network for four seasons. The show ended in 2017 when NBCUniversal announced it was shutting down the Esquire Network cable channel.
