= Michelle Bernstein =

American chef

- Education: Johnson & Wales University
- Spouse: David Martinez
- Culinary career
- Cooking style: Latin cuisine
- Current restaurants: Cafe la Trova (2018-); Sweet Liberty (2015-); La Cañita (2021-); Little Liberty (2022-)
- Previous restaurants: Azul (2001–2005); Michy's (2005–2018); SRA (2008–2011); Crumb on Parchment (2011–2018); Seagrape (2015–2017)
- Television shows: Melting Pot; Check, Please! South Florida; SoFlo Taste (2015–)
- Award won: James Beard Foundation Award – 2008
- Website: www.chefmichellebernstein.com

Michelle Bernstein is an American chef from Miami, Florida. She is a James Beard Foundation Award recipient and cooks in a Latin American style.

== Early life ==
The daughter of an Argentine-Jewish mother and a father with Russian-Jewish heritage, Bernstein graduated from high school at 16 and moved to New York City to study dance at Alvin Ailey American Dance Theater. She later studied culinary arts at Johnson & Wales University.

== Career ==
In 2001 she opened the restaurant Azul at the Mandarin Oriental. She was a co-host of the Food Network series Melting Pot and once won a battle on Iron Chef America versus Bobby Flay. She has appeared as a guest judge on Top Chef. She has hosted a PBS weekly television series, Check, Please! South Florida.

In 2005, Bernstein and her husband, David Martinez, became business partners and left Azul to open Michy's in Miami.

In May 2006, Bernstein became a consulting chef for Delta Air Lines.

Bernstein won the James Beard Foundation Award for best chef in the South in 2008. Bernstein's third restaurant arrived in 2008, called SRA. Martinez, a tapas restaurant in the Miami Design District. Bernstein operates a Miami chapter of Common Threads.

In 2011, Bernstein opened Crumb on Parchment, a café in the Miami Design District.

In April 2015, she debuted her TV show "SoFlo Taste."
