= Harold Dieterle =

American chef and restaurateur

- Born: June 11, 1977 (age 48); West Babylon, New York
- Education: Culinary Institute of America
- Culinary career
- Current restaurant: Perilla (New York City)
- Television show: Top Chef

Harold Dieterle III (born June 11, 1977, in West Babylon, New York) is an American chef, best known as the winner of the first season of the Bravo television network's reality television series Top Chef. After winning Top Chef, he owned and ran three restaurants in New York City: Perilla, Kin Shop, and The Marrow. He closed all three in 2014 and 2015. In 2019 Dieterle opened a new restaurant, "Ten Hope," in Williamsburg, which closed in 2023.

His signature dish is spicy duck meatballs.

== Early life ==
Dieterle attended West Babylon High School and then studied at the Culinary Institute of America, graduating in 1997.

== Career ==
Dieterle's professional career began at Della Femina in the Hamptons for two years. That was followed by three years at Red Bar and two years at 1770 House, both in New York City. For almost five years, he was a sous-chef at The Harrison restaurant in New York.

In October 2005, Dieterle competed in and won the first season of Top Chef. Following his win on the series, he left The Harrison in early 2006 to plan the opening of his restaurant. His first restaurant, Perilla, opened in May 2007 in New York City. In 2010 he opened Kin Shop, a Thai restaurant. In a positive 2010 review of Kin Shop in the magazine New York, food critic Adam Platt called Dieterle "the original (and easily most talented) winner" of Top Chef.

In 2012, he opened The Marrow in New York City, which featured a mashup of Italian and German cuisine that was an ode to Dieterle's German heritage, and his wife's Italian heritage.

The Marrow closed in 2014 after less than two years. In late 2015, Dieterle closed his two remaining restaurants, Kin Shop and Perilla. Dieterle said he was taking a leave from the restaurant and hospitality business. In 2019 he helped open a new restaurant in Williamsburg. Dieterle worked as a consulting chef at the restaurant named Ten Hope and put together the menu. Perilla alum Jim Handwerker works as chef de cuisine. The restaurant closed in 2023. In 2024, Il Totano opened on W. 13th St. in Manhattan, with Dieterle serving as the executive chef.

In 2016 Dieterle served as a consultant for the AMC TV series Feed the Beast, set at a fictional restaurant.

== Personal life ==
On September 4, 2010, Dieterle married Meredith Davies in Atlanta, Georgia. They met at the Food & Wine Classic in Aspen, Colorado, in 2006, the summer after his winning season on Top Chef.
