= Top Chef Amateurs =

American television series

- Genre: Reality competition; Cooking show
- Presented by: Gail Simmons
- Judges: Eric Adjepong; Richard Blais; Jennifer Carroll; Shirley Chung; Stephanie Cmar; Tiffany Derry; Joe Flamm; Gregory Gourdet; Melissa King; Kwame Onwuachi; Dale Talde; Isaac Toups
- Country of origin: United States
- Original language: English
- No. of seasons: 1
- No. of episodes: 12

Production
- Executive producers: Dan Cutforth; Jane Lipsitz
- Production company: Magical Elves Productions

Original release
- Network: Bravo
- Release: July 1 – September 2, 2021

Top Chef Amateurs is an American reality competition series that premiered on July 1, 2021, on Bravo. It is a spin-off of the Top Chef television series, featuring home cooks instead of professional chefs. In each episode, two home cooks compete head-to-head in challenges drawn from previous seasons of Top Chef. Each amateur is paired with a past Top Chef contestant, who acts as an advisor and sous chef. The series is hosted by Gail Simmons, who also serves as head judge. The winner of each episode receives US$5,000.

Production of Top Chef Amateurs began in October 2020 in Portland, Oregon, following filming for Top Chef: Portland. The show was filmed under the same COVID-19 guidelines, utilizing the same kitchen set established at the Portland Expo Center. The competitors were flown to Portland from across the United States, quarantined in their hotel rooms for several days, and tested several times for the coronavirus. Similar to Portland, Amateurs features Top Chef alumni as guest judges, who rotate between cooking with the contestants and judging alongside Simmons.

== Contestants ==
Name	Hometown	Occupation
Bettina Applewhite	Owings Mills, Maryland	School nutrition specialist
Danie Baker	Seattle, Washington	Tax accountant
Brett Bankson	Pittsburgh, Pennsylvania	Neuroscience student
Lorenzo Beronilla	Saugerties, New York	Actor
Karine Ceyhan	Altadena, California	Pharmaceutical sales
Kolby Chandler	Houston, Texas	Software consultant
Steven DeCarlo	New York City, New York	Hairstylist
Ryan Dishman	Denver, Colorado	Software sales
Rodney Faraon	Arlington, Virginia	International business consultant
Derek Finocchiaro	Edgewater, New Jersey	Fragrance laboratory manager
Kayla Hardin	Montgomery, Alabama	High school biology teacher
Amirah Islam	Austin, Texas	User experience designer
David Johnson	Carmel, Indiana	Home sales consultant
Tamara Johnson	Pembroke Pines, Florida	Dental hygienist
Antwan Jones	Los Angeles, California	Insurance adjuster
Zuliya Khawaja	San Diego, California	Real estate broker
Basil Maqbool	Murrieta, California	Pharmacist
Bree Medley	Bremerton, Washington	Architect
Farah Momen	Medford, Massachusetts	Start-up company advisor
Gina Mustoe	Westford, Massachusetts	High school teacher
Marvin Solomon	Los Angeles, California	Writer
Nick Souksavat	Romeoville, Illinois	Visual merchandiser
Sharila Stewart	Jersey City, New Jersey	Law student
Simon Suh	North Bergen, New Jersey	Hairstylist

== Episodes ==
No.	Title	Original release date
1	"Breaking the Curse"	July 1, 2021
Challenge: The home cooks had one hour to create two dishes: one featuring scallops and one featuring risotto.: Farah Momen (with Melissa King): Begali-Style Risotto with Lentils, Lamb Chops with Chimichurri & Tomatoes; Scallop Ceviche with Tamarind, Lime, Mango & Chili with Red Lentil Fritter; Marvin Solomon (with Richard Blais): Carbonara Risotto with Parmesan Bowl with Sous-Vide Egg & Pancetta; Seared Scallop in Miso Dashi Broth with Radishes, Romanesco & Mushrooms; Winner: Farah Momen
2	"Absolutely Radishing"	July 1, 2021
Challenge: The home cooks had one hour to create two dishes featuring radishes.: Basil Maqbool (with Kwame Onwuachi): Watermelon Salad with Pickled Watermelon Radish, Raw Radish & Horseradish Dressing; Grilled Steak Atop Braised & Puréed Daikon Radish with Pickled Radish & Oven-Roasted Purple Radishes; Karine Ceyhan (with Shirley Chung): Flatbread with Za'atar, Radish Tops, Feta & Pomegranate; Ricotta with Honey, Citrus, Roasted Daikon, Hazelnuts & Caramel Sauce; Winner: Basil Maqbool
3	"Don't Clam Up!"	July 8, 2021
Challenge: The home cooks had 45 minutes to create a dish featuring shellfish. However, to get their shellfish, they first had to dig through a fish tank filled with mud.: Gina Mustoe (with Melissa King): Asian Inspired Cioppino With Manila & Quahog Clams, Lemongrass; Simon Suh (with Gregory Gourdet): "Catch of the Day" with Manila & Quahog Clams, King Crab, Oysters & Bacon in Coconut Broth; Winner: Gina Mustoe
4	"No Need to Egg-splain"	July 8, 2021
Challenge: The home cooks had 45 minutes to create a dish featuring at least three different varieties of eggs.: Bree Medley (with Joe Flamm): Savory Duck Egg Waffle with Miso, Orange, Goose Egg Emulsion & Fried Quail Egg on Top; Lorenzo Beronilla (with Richard Blais): Thai Flavored Duck Egg Omelet with Seared Scallops & Pancetta, Caviar & Bottarga on Top; Winner: Lorenzo Beronilla
5	"7 Deadly Sins"	July 15, 2021
Challenge: The home cooks had 45 minutes to prepare a dish inspired by one of the seven deadly sins.: Rodney Faraon (with Gregory Gourdet): Greed - Truffle Risotto with King Crab, Caviar & Gold Flake; Zuliya Khawaja (with Isaac Toups): Gluttony - Braised Delicata Squash, Pomegranate, Coconut Milk Polenta; Winner: Zuliya Khawaja
6	"Opposites Attract"	July 22, 2021
Challenge: The home cooks had one hour to create a dish highlighting two of the five basic taste profiles: salty, sweet, sour, bitter, or umami.: Danie Baker (with Tiffany Derry): Bitter & Sweet - Sweet Potato Soup with Chimichurri, Candied Bacon & Toasted Pecans; Steven DeCarlo (with Joe Flamm): Sour & Salty - Chicken Piccata with Orecchiette Pasta, Toasted Pine Nuts & Lemon Zest; Winner: Danie Baker
7	"Cocoa A Go-Go"	July 29, 2021
Challenge: The home cooks had one hour to create one sweet dish and one savory dish featuring chocolate.: Amirah Islam (with Dale Talde): Cocoa Garam Masala Lamb Chop, White Chocolate Raita; Chocolate Coconut Rice Pudding, Apples & Pistachios; Tamara Johnson (with Kwame Onwuachi): Espresso Chocolate Chicken Mole, Crème Fraîche; Chocolate Rum Ice Cream with Cacao Nibs; Winner: Amirah Islam
8	"Nothing Make Sense"	August 5, 2021
Challenge: The home cooks competed in a blindfolded taste test. Each person was given 10 minutes to guess 30 mystery ingredients. If the contestants gave an incorrect answer, they were prohibited from using the ingredient. Afterwards, the home cooks had 45 minutes to cook any dish using the ingredients they earned, along with limited items from the Top Chef pantry.: Kolby Chandler (with Jennifer Carroll): Chicken Fried Chicken, Creole Gravy & Garlic Mashed Potatoes; Sharila Stewart (with Eric Adjepong): West African Spiced Chicken with Rice & Ginger Garlic Sauce; Winner: Kolby Chandler
9	"Make No Bones About It"	August 12, 2021
Challenge: The home cooks had 45 minutes to filet and cook their own fish.: Bettina Applewhite (with Dale Talde): Crispy Skinned Snapper, Rainbow Chard & Red Pepper Sauce; David Johnson (with Shirley Chung): Pan Seared Sole with Brown Butter Sauce, Roasted Grapes & Fennel Salad; Winner: David Johnson
10	"LasagnYEAH!"	August 19, 2021
Challenge: The home cooks had 45 minutes to reimagine the classic lasagna.: Antwan Jones (with Stephanie Cmar): Korean Lasagna Roll with Lamb, Spinach & Gochujang; Kayla Hardin (with Eric Adjepong): Spicy Pork & Beef Lasagna Roll-Up; Winner: Kayla Hardin
11	"Making Ends Meat"	August 26, 2021
Challenge: The home cooks had one hour to cook a meat and potatoes dish. However, they were responsible for butchering the primal cut beef loins themselves.: Derek Finocchiaro (with Jennifer Carroll): Pan Seared NY Strip, Charred Scallion & Romanesco, Pomme Purée, Potato Crisp; Ryan Dishman (with Tiffany Derry): Manhattan Filet with Bordelaise Sauce, Crispy Potato & Radish Salad; Winner: Ryan Dishman
12	"No Room for Mis-stakes"	September 2, 2021
Challenge: The home cooks competed in a mis en place race. They had one hour to prep three ingredients of their choosing, out of a total of ten options, and create a dish incorporating them. The options included shelling walnuts, separating egg yolks, mincing garlic, peeling and deveining shrimp, dicing onions, breaking down a chicken, supreming oranges, shredding cheddar cheese, frenching racks of lamb, and turning artichokes. The ingredients were available on a first-come, first-served basis; once a home cook grabbed an ingredient from the display table, it became unavailable to their competitor.: Brett Bankson (with Stephanie Cmar): Celery Velouté with Roasted Oranges, Brown Butter Walnut Gremolata; Nick Souksavat (with Isaac Toups): Laotian Grilled Shrimp, Yuzu Hollandaise, Pickled Radish & Rice Cracker; Winner: Brett Bankson
