= Top Chef: Boston =

Season 12 of American television series

- Season 12
- Hosted by: Padma Lakshmi
- Judges: Tom Colicchio; Gail Simmons; Hugh Acheson; Richard Blais
- No. of contestants: 16
- Winner: Mei Lin
- Runner-up: Gregory Gourdet
- Location: Boston, Massachusetts
- Finals venue: San Miguel de Allende, Mexico
- No. of episodes: 15

Release
- Original network: Bravo
- Original release: October 15, 2014 – February 11, 2015

Season chronology
- ← Previous; New Orleans Next → California

Top Chef: Boston is the twelfth season of the American reality television series Top Chef. The season was formally announced on August 20, 2014, and premiered on October 15, 2014. Filming for Season 12 took place from May through June 2014 in locations around Boston, Massachusetts, concluding with a finale in San Miguel de Allende, Guanajuato and the surrounding area. Top Chef: Chicago finalist and Top Chef: All-Stars winner Richard Blais debuted as a recurring judge, joining Tom Colicchio, Gail Simmons, Hugh Acheson, and host Padma Lakshmi on the judging panel. Last Chance Kitchen also returned for its fourth season, beginning with a two-part redemption mid-season and continuing until the first part of the finale. In the season finale, Mei Lin was declared the winner over runner-up Gregory Gourdet. Unlike previous seasons, no Fan Favorite vote was held.

== Production ==
According to reports by Deadline Hollywood, members of Boston's local Teamsters Union allegedly harassed and intimidated Lakshmi and other Top Chef staff during the production's June film shoot at the Steel & Rye restaurant in Milton, Massachusetts. The Teamsters Local 25, upset that Bravo hired non-union personnel to drive cast and crew around Milton, protested the filming, threatening staff using racist, sexist, and homophobic language, and slashing the tires of several crew-owned vehicles. While the network insisted the incident was isolated, sources for The Boston Globe reported that the threats did prompt Bravo to change the locations of some tapings. Teamsters Local 25 later released a statement denying the allegations. Four Teamsters were then indicted on charges of conspiracy to extort, attempted extortion, and aiding and abetting. The trial began on August 1, 2017. On August 15, 2017, a jury acquitted the four Teamsters of all charges.

== Contestants ==
Sixteen chefs competed in Top Chef: Boston.

Name	Hometown	Current Residence (Note: The contestants' city and state of residence during time of filming.)	Age
Doug Adams	Tyler, Texas	Portland, Oregon	29
Stacy Cogswell	Boston, Massachusetts		33
Joy Crump	Coatesville, Pennsylvania	Fredericksburg, Virginia	46
Ron Eyester	Long Island, New York	Atlanta, Georgia	40
Gregory Gourdet	Queens, New York	Portland, Oregon	39
Aaron Grissom	Tacoma, Washington	North Hollywood, California	27
Adam Harvey	New York, New York		29
Rebecca LaMalfa	Chico, California	Chicago, Illinois	32
Mei Lin	Dearborn, Michigan	Los Angeles, California	28
Melissa King	Los Angeles, California	San Francisco, California	30
George Pagonis	Washington, D.C.		31
Michael Patlazhan	Brooklyn, New York		31
Keriann Von Raesfeld	San Jose, California		28
James Rigato	Howell, Michigan	White Lake, Michigan	29
Katsuji Tanabe	Mexico City, Mexico	Los Angeles, California	33
Katie Weinner	Rosemount, Minnesota	Salt Lake City, Utah	35

Katsuji Tanabe returned to compete in Top Chef: Charleston. Tanabe also appeared as a contestant on the first season of Top Chef México. Gregory Gourdet and Melissa King returned for Top Chef: All-Stars L.A.

== Contestant progress ==
Episode #		1	2	3	4	5	6	7	8	9	10	11^{4}	12	13	14	15
Quickfire Challenge Winner(s)		Aaron^{1} Adam^{1} Doug^{1} Keriann^{1}	James^{1}	Gregory	Katsuji	Gregory	Katie	N/A	Gregory	George	Melissa^{1}	N/A	Mei^{1}	Doug^{1}	Gregory^{1}	N/A
Contestant		Elimination Challenge Results														
1	Mei	WIN	HIGH	IN	IN	IN	HIGH	HIGH	LOW	WIN	WIN	HIGH	HIGH	IN	IN	WINNER
2	Gregory	HIGH	WIN	WIN	WIN	WIN	LOW	LOW	HIGH	LOW	HIGH	LOW	LOW	HIGH	WIN	RUNNER-UP
3	Doug	HIGH	IN	IN	IN	WIN	HIGH	WIN	WIN	HIGH	OUT			WIN^{5}	OUT	
4	Melissa	IN	LOW	HIGH	IN	LOW	LOW	HIGH	LOW	HIGH	LOW	WIN	WIN	OUT		
5	George	OUT^{2}							HIGH^{3}	IN	LOW	LOW	OUT			
6	Katsuji	LOW	HIGH	LOW	WIN	WIN	WIN	LOW	IN	OUT						
7	Adam	IN	WIN	IN	IN	IN	IN	HIGH	OUT							
8	Katie	LOW	HIGH	HIGH	IN	WIN	IN	LOW	OUT^{3}							
9	Keriann	IN	LOW	LOW	IN	WIN	IN	OUT								
10	Stacy	IN	LOW	IN	IN	LOW	OUT									
11	Aaron	IN	LOW	IN	WIN	OUT										
12	James	IN	IN	IN	OUT											
12	Rebecca	IN	WIN	IN	OUT											
14	Ron	IN	LOW	OUT												
15	Joy	IN	OUT													
16	Michael	OUT														

^Note 1: The chef(s) did not receive immunity for winning the Quickfire Challenge.
^Note 2: George lost the Sudden Death Quickfire Challenge and was eliminated.
^Note 3: Katie lost the Sudden Death Quickfire Challenge against George. As a result, George was reinstated into the competition.
^Note 4: There were no eliminations in Episode 11.
^Note 5: Doug won Last Chance Kitchen and returned to the competition.

(WINNER) The chef won the season and was crowned "Top Chef".
(RUNNER-UP) The chef was a runner-up for the season.
(WIN) The chef won the Elimination Challenge.
(HIGH) The chef was selected as one of the top entries in the Elimination Challenge, but did not win.
(IN) The chef was not selected as one of the top or bottom entries in the Elimination Challenge and was safe.
(LOW) The chef was selected as one of the bottom entries in the Elimination Challenge, but was not eliminated.
(OUT) The chef lost the Elimination Challenge.

== Episodes ==
No. overall	No. in season	Title	Original release date	US viewers (millions)
174	1	"Sudden Death"	October 15, 2014	1.09
Sudden Death Quickfire Challenge: The chefs, separated into four teams, competed in a mise en place relay race.: Green Team: Aaron, Adam, Doug, Keriann; Yellow Team: Katie, Rebecca, Ron, Stacy; Blue Team: James, Katsuji, Mei, Michael; Red Team: George, Gregory, Joy, Melissa; Winner: Green Team; Sudden Death Cook-off: George, the slowest member of the losing team, had to select another chef to compete against in a sudden death cook-off, using any of the mise en place ingredients. If George lost to his challenger, he would be eliminated from the competition. He chose to compete against Gregory.; Winner: Gregory (Oysters with Yuzu & Ginger Mignonette, Mirin-Marinated Mackerel, Lobster with Coconut & Tomato Sauce); Eliminated: George (Pan-Seared Mackerel with Fennel Orange Kalamata Salad & Warmed Clams); Elimination Challenge: The chefs served updated versions of their very first dishes.: Winner: Mei (Congee with Caramelized Pork, Fish Sauce Caramel & Black Garlic Purée); Eliminated: Michael (Chilled Corn Soup with Pickled Cherries & Sriracha Caviar)
175	2	"Boston's Bravest and Finest"	October 22, 2014	0.98
Quickfire Challenge: The chefs created surf and turf dishes in a challenge inspired by the phrase "one if by land, two if by sea," coined by Henry Wadsworth Longfellow in his 1860 poem "Paul Revere's Ride". While cooking, the chefs had to pay close attention to two signal lanterns. If one lantern turned on, they had to incorporate a "land ingredient"; if two lanterns turned on, they had to use a "sea ingredient". Instead of immunity, the winner received $5,000.: Winner: James (Sautéed Mussels with Boar Bacon Broth, Sautéed Fiddlehead Ferns, Sauerkraut & Tosaka); Elimination Challenge: The chefs, working in teams, served dishes for the men and women of Boston's police and fire departments. Survivor: Millennials vs. Gen X contestant Bret LaBelle appeared as one of the police officers. Instead of shopping for their own ingredients, each group cooked using a different set of mystery ingredients available in the kitchen; each set of ingredients was first-come, first-served. The chefs drew knives to determine the teams and order of service.: 1. Red Team: Katie, Katsuji, Mei; 2. Blue Team: Adam, Gregory, Rebecca; 3. Grey Team: Doug, James; 4. Yellow Team: Joy, Melissa, Ron; 5. Green Team: Aaron, Keriann, Stacy; Winner: Blue Team (Filet Mignon, Parsnip Purée, Pan-Seared Scallops & Marcona Vinaigrette); Eliminated: Joy (Maple & Vanilla Wood-Roasted Veal Chop with Vanilla-Scented Celery Root Purée & Citrus Kale Slaw)
176	3	"The Curse of the Bambino"	October 29, 2014	1.05
Sudden Death Quickfire Challenge: The chefs created a dish highlighting tea, in reference to the Boston Tea Party. The winner received immunity from elimination.: Winner: Gregory (Tuna Crudo with Strawberry White Tea & Coconut); Sudden Death Cook-off: Aaron, who made the judges' least favorite dish, had to select another chef to compete against in a sudden death cook-off, using boiling water as their only heat source. If Aaron lost to his challenger, he would be eliminated from the competition. He chose to compete against Katie.; Winner: Aaron (Cucumber, Carrot, Mint & Raw Peanuts Wrapped in Puréed Shrimp Noodle); Elimination Challenge: Using classic ballpark snacks, such as popcorn, peanuts, pretzels, and cotton candy, as inspiration for their cooking, the chefs served fine dining dishes at Fenway Park.: Winner: Gregory (Roasted Duck, Peanut Nam Prik Pao, Peanut Brittle, Crispy Shallots & Fresh Herb Salad); Eliminated: Ron (Popcorn Soup, Breaded Fish Croquette, Dill Pickled Celery & Sun Gold Tomatoes)
177	4	"12 Chefs Walk Into a Bar..."	November 5, 2014	0.91
Quickfire Challenge: The chefs traveled to Cheers Beacon Hill to create tasty bar snacks. The winner received immunity from elimination.: Winner: Katsuji (Mahi Mahi & Tuna Ceviche with Roasted Tomato & Jalapeño Salsa); Elimination Challenge: The chefs, working in teams of their choosing, created a three-course Italian menu, including antipasto, pasta, and secondi. The team whose menu was ordered the most by the diners won the challenge; all other teams were eligible for a double elimination. During service, the chefs were informed that one guest, Emmy Rossum, had a gluten-free restriction, forcing those in charge of the pasta course to create an alternative dish.: Purple Team: Aaron, Gregory, Katsuji; Orange Team: Adam, Doug, Mei; Grey Team: James, Keriann, Melissa; Blue Team: Katie, Rebecca, Stacy; Winner: Purple Team; Eliminated: James (Chilled Wild Shrimp, Mussels & Clams with Arugula, Navel Orange & Capers) and Rebecca (Seared Scallop with Charred Fennel, Orange & Arugula)
178	5	"It's War"	November 12, 2014	0.90
Quickfire Challenge: The chefs faced-off in head-to-head battles using Reynold kitchen products; each pair of competitors had to create the same dish using the same cooking method. Among the winners of each match-up (below in italics), the contestant with the best overall dish received $10,000.: Smoked Salmon: Aaron vs. Katsuji; Steamed Mussels: Adam vs. Doug; Trout en Papillote: Keriann vs. Stacy; Smoked BBQ: Katie vs. Melissa; Steamed Dumplings: Gregory vs. Mei; Winner: Gregory (Steamed Shrimp Dumpling with Ginger & Herbs); Elimination Challenge: The winners of the Quickfire Challenge took on the losers in a "culinary war". Once again, the chefs competed in head-to-head matches, each named after critical battles from the American Revolutionary War. The winner of each match-up (below in italics) earned their team a point. The first team to score three points won the challenge.: Red Team: Aaron, Adam, Mei, Melissa, Stacy; Blue Team: Doug, Gregory, Katie, Katsuji, Keriann; Battle of Lexington/Concord: Adam vs. Doug; Battle of Bunker Hill: Melissa vs. Katsuji; Battle of Trenton: Mei vs. Gregory; Battles of Saratoga: Stacy vs. Keriann; Battle of Yorktown: Aaron vs. Katie; Winner: Blue Team; Eliminated: Aaron (Pork Meatball & Scallop Noodles)
179	6	"The First Thanksgiving"	November 19, 2014	0.95
Quickfire Challenge: The chefs created dishes highlighting cranberries. Prior to the challenge, the contestants traveled to a cranberry bog to harvest fresh cranberries. The first four chefs to fill their crates were able to select from a pantry of high-quality ingredients during the Quickfire, while the remaining contestants were forced to use low-quality ingredients.: Winner: Katie (Cranberry Borscht with Crème Fraîche, Charred Brussels Sprout & Pancetta); Elimination Challenge: The chefs served a traditional Thanksgiving meal at the Plimoth Plantation, using only the ingredients and cookware that were available during the "First Thanksgiving".: Winner: Katsuji (Roasted Butternut Squash with Poached Lobster, Chestnuts & Ancho Chile Butter); Eliminated: Stacy (Ramp-Smoked Clams with Butternut Squash, Lobsters & Ramps)
180	7	"Restaurant Wars"	December 3, 2014	0.96
Elimination Challenge: The chefs, working in two teams, had 24 hours to create a pop-up restaurant and execute a multi-course dinner service. Each chef was responsible for at least one dish on their team's menu. One member from the losing team was eligible for elimination.: 4 Pigs: Adam, Doug, Mei, Melissa; First Course: Salt-Baked Clams, Ramps, Bacon & Sunflower Seeds (Adam); Chicken Liver Toast with Plum Purée (Mei); Second Course: Braised Pork Shoulder, Baked Beans, Pickled Red Onion & Mustard Seeds (Doug); Seared Scallops & Radish Salad with Grapefruit (Melissa); Fried Brussels Sprouts with Anchovy-Olive Vinaigrette (Mei); Third Course: Buttermilk Biscuit Cobbler, Apples, Mixed Berries & Cardamom Cream (Melissa); Magellan: Gregory, Katie, Katsuji, Keriann; First Course: Roasted Beets, Sri Lankan Curry, Toasted Coconut & Pickled Cauliflower (Katie); Hamachi Sashimi, Roasted Poblano, Blistered Tomato, Citrus-Habanero Salsa & Garlic Chips (Katsuji); Dry Pozole, Chili, Dungeness Crab & Chicharrones (Katsuji); Second Course: Seared Haddock, Spiced Tomato, Garam Masala & Pickled Mushrooms (Gregory); Hoisin-Glazed Pork Tenderloin, Bay Scallops, Broccolini & Xo Sauce (Gregory); Third Course: Vanilla Crêpe, Burnt Banana Mousse, Macerated Cherries with Ginger & Pistachio (Keriann); Winning Team: 4 Pigs; Winner: Doug; Eliminated: Keriann
181	8	"Clean Up in Aisle 2!"	December 10, 2014	0.98
Sudden Death Quickfire Challenge: The chefs had to put their own spin on clam chowder.: Winner: Gregory (Razor Clam & Sweet Potato Chowder with Bacon, Dashi & Coconut Milk Broth); Sudden Death Cook-off: Katie, who made the judges' least favorite dish, had to compete against one of the previously eliminated contestants (selected by vote) in a sudden death cook-off, using rabbit in their dishes. If Katie lost to her challenger, she would be eliminated from the competition and her opponent would take her place. The eliminated chefs voted for George to compete in the cook-off.; Winner: George (Roasted Rabbit Loin, Barley Risotto, Glazed Carrots & Mustard Rabbit Jus); Eliminated: Katie (Braised Rabbit Leg with Moroccan Tomato Sauce); Elimination Challenge: The chefs catered a tasting event for 75 Top Chef fans and foodies. Instead of doing their own shopping, as per usual, the judges shopped for the contestants' ingredients. A draw of knives determined which judge the chefs would obtain their ingredients from: Tom shopped for Mei, Padma shopped for George and Gregory, Gail shopped for Katsuji and Melissa, and Richard shopped for Adam and Doug.: Winner: Doug (Chorizo-Marinated Mussels with Sweet Pepper & Cauliflower Relish); Eliminated: Adam (Flash-Marinated Shrimp, Mushroom Conserva, Peppadew Peppers, Herbs & Aioli)
182	9	"Big Sausage"	December 17, 2014	0.98
Quickfire Challenge: The chefs prepared sausage dishes. The winner received immunity from elimination.: Winner: George (Pork and Veal Sausage Patty with Sunny-Side Up Egg & Potato Hash); Elimination Challenge: Each chef had to create a dish inspired by a famous New England literary work.: Doug: "Bring me the sunset in a cup" by Emily Dickinson; George: One Fish Two Fish Red Fish Blue Fish by Dr. Seuss; Gregory: "The Raven" by Edgar Allan Poe; Katsuji: Carrie by Stephen King; Mei: Walden by Henry David Thoreau; Melissa: The Blithedale Romance by Nathaniel Hawthorne; Winner: Mei (Roasted Vegetables, Charred Onion Soil, Tom Kha Snow, Radish & Carrot Top Vinaigrette); Eliminated: Katsuji (Fabada with White Beans, Chorizo, Jamón Serrano, Short Rib, Veal Osso Buco, Red Beet Purée & Hot Sauce)
183	10	"For Julia & Jacques"	January 7, 2015	1.02
Quickfire Challenge: The chefs created ramen dishes using only ingredients available from college students' dorm rooms. Instead of immunity, the winner received $5,000.: Winner: Melissa (Mac & Cheese Carbonara with Roast Chicken & Frito Crumb Topping); Elimination Challenge: The contestants tested their skills in French cuisine by preparing dishes in tribute to Julia Child.: Winner: Mei (Duck À L'Orange with Turnip Purée, Orange Purée & Glazed Vegetables); Eliminated: Doug (Roasted Foie Gras with Roasted Peaches, Sweet & Sour Onions & Hazelnuts)
184	11	"Sous Your Daddy!"	January 14, 2015	1.09
Elimination Challenge: Each chef was responsible for creating two dishes, one appetizer and one entrée, utilizing local seafood. The chefs' family members joined the challenge, serving as their sous chefs. The contestants were not allowed to touch the appetizers, leaving solely their loved ones responsible for executing those dishes. While the chefs were not in danger of elimination, as an added incentive, the winner was guaranteed entry into the finals.: Winner: Melissa (Egg Custard with Shiitake Mushrooms, Clams & Lobster; Butter-Poached Lobster with Onion Soubise & Pea Purée)
185	12	"The Final Battle of Bean Town"	January 21, 2015	0.99
Quickfire Challenge: The chefs made dishes highlighting beans. Instead of immunity, the winner earned a trip to Napa, California.: Winner: Mei (Black Beans & Corn with Chipotle Peppers, Bacon, Poached Eggs & Pinto Bean Foam); Elimination Challenge: The chefs created innovative dishes that pushed their own culinary boundaries. The winner received $10,000.: Winner: Melissa (Seared Duck Breast with Farro, Walnut Miso & Pickled Cherries); Eliminated: George (Charred Octopus, Yellow Split Pea Purée, Green Apple & Harissa)
186	13	"Getting Prickly In Mexico"	January 28, 2015	1.11
Quickfire Challenge: After arriving in San Miguel de Allende, Mexico, the chefs prepared dishes highlighting xoconostle. The winner was given first choice of sous chefs during the Elimination Challenge.: Winner: Doug (Xoconostle & Tomatillo Stew with Roasted Peppers & Pepitas); Elimination Challenge: The chefs created dishes inspired by an artist's piece of work.: Winner: Doug (Brisket Texas Red with Tomatillo & Masa Cake); Eliminated: Melissa (Smoked Eggplant Ravioli with Shrimp, Chorizo & Cotija)
187	14	"Holy Escamoly!"	February 4, 2015	0.89
Quickfire Challenge: The chefs created sweet and savory dishes using Mexican chocolate. The winner was given first choice of sous chef during the Elimination Challenge.: Winner: Gregory (Seared Lamb with White Chocolate Ancho Sauce & Green Chorizo Vinaigrette; Baby Carrots with Turmeric, Dark Chocolate & Ginger); Elimination Challenge: The chefs worked together to prepare a six-course meal highlighting six different Mexican ingredients: avocado, escamoles, guava, huitlacoche, poblano, and queso fresco. Each contestant was responsible for two dishes.: Winner: Gregory (Chilled Guava Soup with Bay Scallops, Habanero & Roasted Guava; Pork & Poblano Stew with Tomatillos); Eliminated: Doug (Tortilla Español with Escamoles & Escamol Aioli; Smoked Queso Fresco with Spiced Honey, Squash Chips & Charred Pickles)
188	15	"Mano a Mano"	February 11, 2015	0.96
Elimination Challenge: The finalists, with the assistance of two sous chefs of their choosing (Melissa & Rebecca for Mei, and Doug & George for Gregory) had to cook the best four-course meal of their lives.: Mei: First Course: Octopus with Fish Sauce Vinaigrette, Avocado-Coconut Purée & Herbs; Second Course: Congee with Carnitas, Scallion Purée, Hot Sauce, Peanuts & Egg Yolk; Third Course: Duck with Braised Lettuce, Kimchi Jicama & Huitlacoche; Fourth Course: Strawberry Lime Curd with Toasted Yogurt, Milk Crumble & Yogurt-Lime Ice; Gregory: First Course: Grilled Octopus with Prickly Pear, Xoconostle, Passion Fruit & Cashew Milk; Second Course: Shrimp Broth with Green Chorizo, Pickled Nopales & Crispy Shrimp Heads; Third Course: Striped Bass with Roasted Carrots, Radish, Pineapple & Tomatillo; Fourth Course: Red Mole with Short Ribs & Agave Sweet Potato; Winner: Mei; Runner-up: Gregory

== Last Chance Kitchen ==
No.	Title	Original air date
1	"Redemption Royal"	December 10, 2014
Challenge: The chefs transformed the dishes that sent them home into winning dishes.: Aaron: Nori & Soy Pork Sausage, Seared Scallop, Hon Dashi Pickled Vegetables & Lemon Ginger Syrup; James: Ponzu Marinated Clams, Shaved Vegetable Herb & Citrus Salad; Joy: Roasted Veal with Celery Root Purée, Bacon Studded Kale & Pickled Vegetable Vinaigrette; Keriann: Vanilla Crêpe, Burnt Banana & White Chocolate Mousse, Marinated Berries, Salty Sweet Fritter & Caramel Sauce; Rebecca: Seared Scallops with Fennel Garlic Purée, Wilted Fennel & Crispy Shallots; Ron: Haddock with Bay Scallop & Corn Purée, Tomato Corn Salad & Fried Capers; Stacy: Butternut Squash & Bacon Soup with Brown Butter Poached Lobster Tail & Fried Clams; Winner: Rebecca; Eliminated: Aaron, James, Joy, Keriann, Ron, Stacy
2	"Dry and Slimy"	December 10, 2014
Challenge: The chefs created dishes using dry and slimy ingredients.: Rebecca: Warm Octopus & Confit Potato Salad, Toasted Pepitas & Pickled Red Onions; Adam: Salt Baked Oyster, White Miso Glaçage, Pickled Morels & Nori; Katie: Pancetta & Mascarpone Stuffed Morels with Tomatillo, Cranberry & Pepita Salad with Miso Vinaigrette; Winners: Adam, Katie; Eliminated: Rebecca
3	"The Kitchen Sink"	December 17, 2014
Challenge: Each chef had to create a cohesive dish using 20 or more ingredients.: Adam: Peruvian Ceviche, Summer Vegetable "Leche de Tigre"; Katie: Indian Tomato "Stew" with Yogurt Herb Sauce & Seared Spiced Eggplant; Katsuji: Pescado Encacahuatado Mole with Nuts, Dry Fruits & Chiles; Winners: Adam, Katsuji; Eliminated: Katie
4	"Liverwurst Nightmare"	January 7, 2015
Challenge: Each chef created a dish featuring liver.: Adam: Beef Liver "Alla Nonna", Onions, Peppers & Roasted Portobello Mushroom Caps; Katsuji: Higado Encebollado Goat Liver & Onions; Doug: Seared Pork Liver with Onions & Chimichurri; Winners: Adam, Doug; Eliminated: Katsuji
5	"Crudité Redux"	January 14, 2015
Challenge: The chefs prepared dishes using produce from crudité platters.: Adam: "White Pie Cannelloni" with Ranch Pancetta & Agrodolce Raisins; Doug: Seared Pork Loin, Spiced Cauliflower, Red Pepper Ranch & Ranch Pickled Vegetables; Winner: Doug; Eliminated: Adam
6	"The Last Chance Kitchen Finals"	January 21, 2015
Challenge: The chefs created Mexican-inspired dishes featuring clams.: Doug: Clams with Charred Pineapple Butter, Tomatillo, Tomatoes & Pickled Red Onion; George: Steamed Clams with Serrano & Tomatillo Salsa Verde; Winner: Doug; Eliminated: George
