= Mei Lin (chef) =

Chinese-American chef and television personality

- Born: Guangdong, China
- Occupations: Chef, television personality
- Culinary career
- Current restaurants: Nightshade, Los Angeles (2019–2022); Daybird, Los Angeles (2021–present)

Mei Lin is a Chinese-American chef and television personality, best known as the winner of the twelfth season of the Bravo television network's reality television series, Top Chef. After winning Top Chef in 2014, Lin worked as a personal chef for Oprah Winfrey before going on to open her first restaurant, Nightshade in Los Angeles in 2019. She became engaged to her fiancé Andrew Skala on January 14, 2023. On April 9, 2023, Lin won the fourth season of Food Network's Tournament of Champions.

== Early life and education ==
Lin was born in Guangdong, China before moving to Dearborn, Michigan at three months old. She attended Fordson High School and attended Schoolcraft College.

== Career ==
After receiving her certification from Schoolcraft College, Lin worked as a cook for the Detroit Lions. Following her time with the Lions, Lin was part of the opening team for chef Michael Symon's Roast in Downtown Detroit, before working at Wolfgang Puck's Las Vegas location of Spago. Following her tenure at Spago, Lin joined the opening team for Top Chef Michael Voltaggio's ink. in Los Angeles, where she worked as a sous chef until her appearance on Top Chef. After winning Top Chef, Lin worked as a personal chef for Oprah Winfrey and contributed recipes to Winfrey's cookbook, Food, Health & Happiness.

In 2019, Lin opened her first restaurant, Nightshade, in the Los Angeles Arts District on January 2, 2019.

In 2020, Nightshade was named a James Beard Foundation Award finalist for Best New Restaurant.

Nightshade officially closed in 2020 due to COVID-19.

In March 2021, following delays caused by the COVID-19 pandemic, Lin opened her second restaurant ''Daybird'' in Los Angeles. Lin describes it as the first fast-casual Sichuan hot chicken restaurant in the United States.

=== Top Chef: Boston ===
Lin competed in the twelfth season of Bravo's Top Chef in 2014. In the series finale, filmed on-location in San Miguel de Allende, Guanajuato, Mexico, Lin faced off against challenger Gregory Gourdet. Lin's fourth course, strawberry lime curd with toasted yogurt, milk crumble and yogurt-lime ice, was particularly noteworthy. During the judges' table segment, judge Tom Colicchio hailed it as "the best dessert I have ever had on Top Chef, period, and one of the best desserts I've had in my life." Colicchio's fellow Top Chef judge Hugh Acheson echoed his sentiments, calling the dish "blow-you-away amazing" and declaring Lin "a chef's chef."

=== Tournament of Champions ===
Lin competed in the fourth season of Food Network's Tournament of Champions in 2023, winning the tournament. After an initial round where her dish scored 84, Lin went on to garner judges' scores of 90 points or more in the final four rounds of the contest. In the final round, she defeated Season 2 Champion Maneet Chauhan by a score of 91-89. Lin's four dishes that garnered 90 points or greater from the judges represented four of the top six scores in the competition.

== Awards and honors ==
=== Competition wins ===
Lin has won two major televised cooking competitions: the twelfth season of Top Chef and the fourth season of Tournament of Champions.

=== Industry recognition ===
In 2020, Lin was named a semifinalist by the James Beard Foundation for Best Chef: California. That same year, her restaurant Nightshade was a finalist for the foundation's Best New Restaurant award.

Following its opening in 2019, Nightshade received numerous accolades. It was named "Restaurant of the Year" by Eater LA and recognized for the "Best Culinary Debut" by Robb Report. The restaurant appeared on "Best New Restaurant" lists from Food & Wine, GQ, and Eater. Additionally, Food & Wine named the restaurant's prawn toast as its "Dish of the Year" for 2019. In 2020, Conde Nast Traveler included the establishment on its list of the 46 best restaurants in Los Angeles.

== See also ==
- East Asian cuisine
- History of Chinese Americans in Metro Detroit
