= Gregory Gourdet =

American chef (born 1975)

- Born: July 25, 1975 (age 51); New York City
- Education: NYU; University of Montana; Culinary Institute of America
- Occupation: Chef
- Awards: James Beard Award
- Website: gregorygourdet.com

Gregory Jennings Gourdet (born July 25, 1975) is an American chef, writer, restaurateur, and former finalist on the twelfth and seventeenth seasons of Bravo's American reality television series, Top Chef. He is of Haitian descent. He is three-time James Beard Foundation Award-winning chef, the owner of the restaurant Kann, and the former executive chef and culinary director of Departure at The Nines in Portland, Oregon. His book, Everyone’s Table: Global Recipes for Modern Health, is a national bestseller.

== Early life and education ==
Gourdet was born on July 25, 1975, in New York City to Haitian immigrant parents. He was raised in Laurelton, Queens, and graduated high school from St. Andrew's (Delaware). He attended NYU for one year, where he studied pre-med. He then attended University of Montana (UM), where he studied wildlife biology before graduating with a degree in French.

During his time at UM, Gourdet discovered his passion for cooking, and went on to enroll in The Culinary Institute of America. From there, he earned an internship with chef Jean-Georges Vongerichten, and was mentored by him for almost seven years.

== Career ==
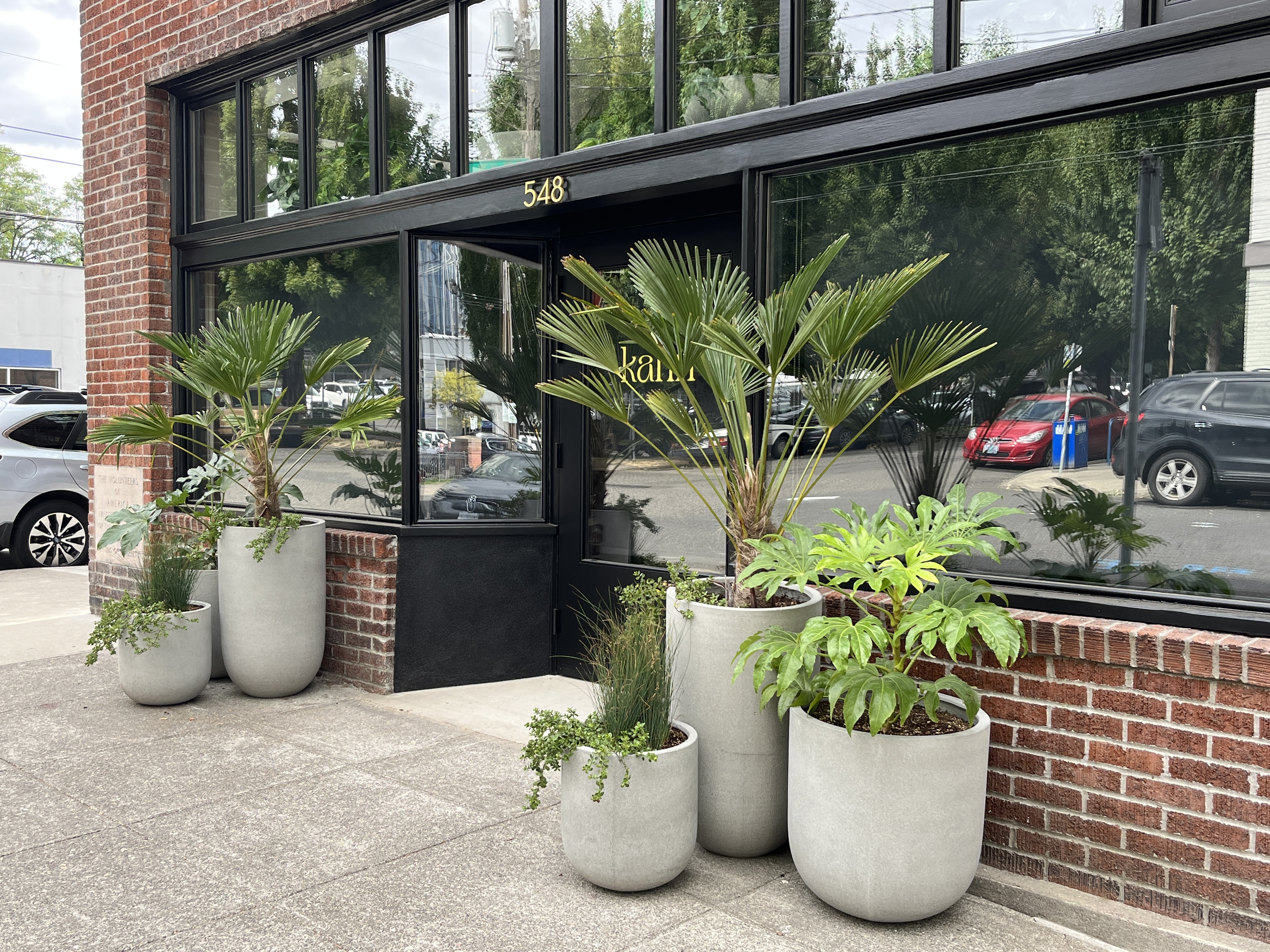
Exterior of Kann, 2022

After graduating from The Culinary Institute of America in 2000, Gourdet went to work full-time for chef Jean-Georges Vongerichten, honing his craft at three of Vongerichten's restaurants before climbing the ranks to become one of his chefs de cuisine.

In 2010, Gourdet took the helm as Executive Chef of Departure Restaurant and Lounge in Portland, Oregon, where he created modern Asian cuisine by combining local ingredients of the Pacific Northwest with flavors and traditions of Japan, China, Thailand, Vietnam, and Korea. In 2016, he was promoted to Culinary Director when the brand expanded to Denver, Colorado.

In 2019, Gourdet ended his 10-year tenure with Departure to focus on opening his own restaurant, Kann, a wood-fired concept that strives to bring the cuisine of his Haitian heritage and the Caribbean diaspora to the American spotlight. In 2020, after COVID-19 pushed back plans to open the restaurant, Gourdet launched a Portland Kann pop-up in Portland. Kann opened in Portland in August 2022, quickly being named a “Best New Restaurant” by Eater, The New York Times, and Robb Report, and Esquire’s #1 “Best New Restaurant in America.” It was also Portland Monthly and The Oregonian’s Restaurant of the Year and won the James Beard Award for “Best New Restaurant” in 2023. In 2024, Gregory was honored as “Best Chef: Northwest and Pacific” by the James Beard Foundation. That year, The New York Times included Kann in its “25 Best Restaurants in Portland, OR Right Now” list, and La Liste named it one of the world’s best restaurants for 2025. The cocktail bar Sousòl operates below Kann, and was named one of Esquire’s “Best Bars in America" in 2023.

Since 2025 he has been the culinary director of the Printemps department store in New York City where he oversees five dining concepts from fine dining to a casual cafe.

=== Book ===
In 2021, Gourdet published his first cookbook, Everyone's Table: Global Recipes for Modern Health, a guide to cooking globally inspired dishes free of gluten, dairy, soy, legumes, and grains. The book was written with J.J. Goode and published by Harper Wave Books on May 11, 2021. The book is a national bestseller aiming to make healthy eating accessible. On June 11, 2022, Everyone's Table won the James Beard Award for Best Cookbook.

== Television appearances ==
Gourdet first achieved television fame in 2015 when he competed on Bravo's Top Chef Season 12 and finished runner-up. He went on to make numerous other TV appearances, including competing once more on Top Chef: All-Stars L.A., and finishing again as a finalist.

=== Filmography ===
Television
| Year | Title | Role |
|---|---|---|
| 2011 | Extreme Chef | Contestant |
| 2014 | Into the Underbelly | Self |
| 2014 | Cutthroat Kitchen | Contestant |
| 2015 | Top Chef (Season 12) | Contestant |
| 2015 | Watch What Happens: Live | Self |
| 2016 | Portlandia | Gregory Gourdet |
| 2018 | Iron Chef Showdown | Challenger |
| 2020 | Top Chef (Season 17) | Contestant |
| 2020 | Race in America: A Movement Not A Moment (TV Special) | Self |
| 2020 | DotGay Presents: The Library (TV Miniseries Documentary) | Self |
| 2020 | Today | Self |
| 2021 | Top Chef (Season 18) | Guest Judge |
| 2021 | Top Chef Amateurs | Guest Judge |
| 2021 | Top Chef Family Style | Guest Judge |
| 2022 | Iron Chef: Quest for an Iron Legend | Challenger |

== Awards ==
Gourdet was named "Hottest Chef 2012" from Eater Portland. He was named "Chef of the Year" in 2013 by the Oregon Department of Agriculture. In 2014, he was given the same honor by Eater Portland.

He is a three-time James Beard Award semifinalist, and, in 2020, received his first nomination as a finalist for the award in the category Best Chef: Northwest & Pacific. In 2022, Gourdet's book Everyone's Table: Global Recipes for Modern Health won a James Beard Media Award for Best General Cookbook. In 2023, his restaurant Kann was awarded James Beard "Best New Restaurant". He won the James Beard Award for Best Chef: Northwest and Pacific (Alaska, Hawaii, Oregon, Washington) in 2024.

== Personal life ==
Gourdet is an avid long-distance runner. He is openly gay and lives in Portland.

Gourdet used to battle with cocaine and alcohol, and has been sober since 2007.

== See also ==
- List of LGBTQ people from Portland, Oregon
