= Stephanie Cmar =

American chef (born 1985)

- Born: 1985 (age 40–41)
- Education: Johnson & Wales University
- Culinary career
- Previous restaurants: No.9 Park; B&G Oysters; Stir; Stacked Donuts (2014); Party of Two; Fairsted Kitchen (2015-2016)
- Television shows: Top Chef: Seattle; Top Chef: New Orleans; Top Chef: All-Stars L.A.; Top Chef Amateurs
- Website: stephaniecmar.com

Stephanie Cmar (born 1985) is an American private chef and television personality best known for competing on three seasons of Top Chef. Cmar was a finalist in Top Chef: All-Stars L.A.

== Early life and education ==
Cmar's first restaurant job was at age 15 at the Muffin Shop in Marblehead, Massachusetts. In 2007, she graduated from Johnson & Wales University.

== Career ==
Cmar has worked at several restaurants including B&G Oysters, Stir, and at Barbara Lynch’s flagship restaurant, No.9 Park, as a sous-chef. Cmar left No.9 Park in 2014 to operate the pop-up donut shop, Stacked Donuts. Cmar and Justin Burke-Samson operated a catering company and pop-up called Party of Two. Party of Two toured the US in 2014. In 2015, Cmar became the executive chef at Fairsted Kitchen in Boston. June 2015 to February 2016, Cmar was the executive chef of Fairsted Kitchen in Boston. Cmar left Fairsted to return to being a private chef.

Cmar originally participated in the qualifying rounds on the first episode of Top Chef: Seattle, alongside her best friend, Kristen Kish, who ultimately won the season. Cmar was not chosen to move on into the competition proper. Cmar was invited back to compete in Top Chef: New Orleans and placed seventh after a controversial elimination in which the worst-performing chef of the challenge was unable to be eliminated due to his immunity. Cmar was invited to return again for Top Chef: All-Stars L.A. and was often described as the underdog of the season. Cmar advanced to the finals in All-Stars L.A., but ultimately lost to Melissa King. She served as a guest judge on Top Chef Amateurs and culinary producer for Top Chef: World All-Stars.

In 2020, Cmar launched a mini online cooking show on her Instagram called, "My Shitty Little Kitchen", produced by Brian Pu Ruiz.

== Personal life ==
Cmar has two brothers, Colton and Wyatt. In 2018, Cmar's brother Colton died from a drug overdose. Cmar spoke openly about her brother's death in Top Chef: All-Stars L.A. and said the first course of her finale meal was inspired by him. In December 2020, Cmar and her husband, David Cavilla, moved from Boston to Maine.
