= Georgian Room =

Defunct restaurant in Portland, Oregon, U.S.

- Interactive map of Georgian Room

Restaurant information
- Location: 525 SW Morrison Street, Portland, Multnomah, Oregon, 97204, United States
- Coordinates: 45.51920°N 122.6781°W

The Georgian Room was a restaurant on the tenth floor of Portland, Oregon's Meier & Frank Building, in the United States. The Nines occupies space which had housed the restaurant. The Georgian Room hosted "ladies who lunch" and has been described as "a popular luncheon spot for well-to-do Portland women".

In 2016, Grant Butler included the Georgian Room in The Oregonian's list of "97 long-gone Portland restaurants we wish were still around", writing, "Since the 1930s, this was a spot where ladies lunched on iceberg lettuce salads and chicken à la king. The food was hardly remarkable, but there was a sense that you were dining in a place with history. And the atmosphere – sea foam-green walls, majestic curtains, crystal chandeliers – was like an elegant grandma."
