= Top Chef: All-Stars L.A. =

Season 17 of American television series

- Season 17
- Hosted by: Padma Lakshmi
- Judges: Tom Colicchio; Gail Simmons
- No. of contestants: 15
- Winner: Melissa King
- Runners-up: Bryan Voltaggio; Stephanie Cmar
- Location: Los Angeles, California
- Finals venue: Tuscany, Italy
- Fan Favorite: Melissa King
- No. of episodes: 14

Release
- Original network: Bravo
- Original release: March 19 – June 18, 2020

Season chronology
- ← Previous; Kentucky Next → Portland

Top Chef: All-Stars L.A. is the seventeenth season of the American reality television series Top Chef. The season was first announced on November 16, 2019, during a Top Chef-themed panel at Bravo's inaugural fan convention, BravoCon. The competition was filmed in Los Angeles, California, the same setting as the second season. The season finale took place in Tuscany, Italy, marking the first time the show has traveled to Europe. As with the previous all-stars edition, the cast of All-Stars L.A. was composed entirely of returning contestants. Padma Lakshmi and Tom Colicchio returned to judge, along with Gail Simmons, following her absence from the previous season. Along with the return of Last Chance Kitchen, a new web series titled What Would Tom Do? debuted, showcasing Colicchio's approach to the contestants' various challenges. The winner received US$250,000.

The season premiered on March 19, 2020, and concluded on June 18, 2020. In the season finale, Top Chef: Boston finalist Melissa King was declared the winner over Top Chef: Las Vegas and Top Chef Masters Season 5 runner-up Bryan Voltaggio, and Top Chef: Seattle and Top Chef: New Orleans contestant Stephanie Cmar. King was also voted Fan Favorite.

== Contestants ==
Fifteen past Top Chef contestants competed in Top Chef: All-Stars L.A.

Name	Current Residence (Note: The contestants' city and state of residence during time of filming.)	Season(s)	Original Placement(s)
Eric Adjepong	Washington, D.C.	Season 16	3rd
Karen Akunowicz	Boston, Massachusetts	Season 13	7th
Jennifer Carroll	Philadelphia, Pennsylvania/Washington, D.C.	Season 6, 8	4th, 17th
Stephanie Cmar	Boston, Massachusetts	Season 10, 11	N/A (Note: Stephanie Cmar was eliminated during the qualifying rounds of Top Chef: Seattle.), 7th
Lisa Fernandes	Brooklyn, New York	Season 4	Runner-up
Kevin Gillespie	Atlanta, Georgia	Season 6	Runner-up
Gregory Gourdet	Portland, Oregon	Season 12	Runner-up
Melissa King	San Francisco, California	Season 12	4th
Jamie Lynch	Charlotte, North Carolina	Season 14	9th
Brian Malarkey	San Diego, California	Season 3	4th
Nini Nguyen	New York, New York	Season 16	12th
Joe Sasto	Los Angeles, California	Season 15	3rd
Angelo Sosa	San Diego, California	Season 7, 8	Runner-up, 7th
Bryan Voltaggio	Frederick, Maryland	Season 6, Masters 5	Runner-up, Runner-up
Lee Anne Wong	Maui, Hawaii	Season 1, 15	4th, 11th

== Contestant progress ==
Episode #		1	2	3	4	5	6	7	8	9	10	11	12	13	14
Quickfire Challenge Winner(s)		Bryan^{1} Jamie^{1} Joe^{1} Kevin^{1} Melissa^{1}	N/A	Kevin	Gregory	Kevin	Gregory^{1}	Stephanie	N/A	Lee Anne^{1}	Melissa^{1}	Melissa^{1}	Kevin^{1}	N/A	N/A
Contestant		Elimination Challenge Results													
1	Melissa	IN	IN	WIN	WIN	IN^{2}	WIN	HIGH	LOW	LOW	LOW	WIN	WIN	WIN	WINNER
2	Bryan	IN	HIGH	HIGH	IN	IN	LOW	IN	LOW	WIN	HIGH	IN	HIGH	LOW	RUNNER-UP
2	Stephanie	HIGH	LOW	LOW	IN	LOW	IN	LOW	WIN	IN	WIN	HIGH	LOW	HIGH	RUNNER-UP
4	Kevin	IN	WIN	IN	HIGH	IN	WIN	WIN	OUT			IN^{4}	LOW	OUT	
5	Gregory	WIN	IN	IN	HIGH	WIN	IN	WIN	WIN	HIGH	LOW	LOW	OUT		
6	Brian	LOW	IN	HIGH	LOW	LOW	HIGH	HIGH	WIN	LOW	LOW	OUT			
7	Karen	IN	IN	LOW	HIGH	IN	OUT	IN^{3}	LOW	HIGH	OUT				
8	Lee Anne	LOW	IN	LOW	LOW	IN	HIGH	LOW	WIN	OUT					
9	Eric	IN	LOW	HIGH	HIGH	HIGH	LOW	OUT							
10	Nini	IN	HIGH	IN	IN	HIGH	OUT								
11	Jennifer	IN	IN	IN	HIGH	OUT									
12	Lisa	IN	IN	IN	OUT										
13	Jamie	HIGH	IN	OUT											
14	Angelo	IN	OUT												
15	Joe	OUT													

^Note 1: The chef(s) did not receive immunity for winning the Quickfire Challenge.
^Note 2: Melissa received immunity for selling the most products during the Elimination Challenge.
^Note 3: Karen won the first Last Chance Kitchen re-entry challenge and returned to the competition.
^Note 4: Kevin won the second Last Chance Kitchen re-entry challenge and returned to the competition.

(WINNER) The chef won the season and was crowned "Top Chef".
(RUNNER-UP) The chef was a runner-up for the season.
(WIN) The chef won the Elimination Challenge.
(HIGH) The chef was selected as one of the top entries in the Elimination Challenge, but did not win.
(IN) The chef was not selected as one of the top or bottom entries in the Elimination Challenge and was safe.
(LOW) The chef was selected as one of the bottom entries in the Elimination Challenge, but was not eliminated.
(OUT) The chef lost the Elimination Challenge.

== Episodes ==
No. overall	No. in season	Title	Original release date	US viewers (millions)
247	1	"It's Like They Never Left!"	March 19, 2020	0.76
Quickfire Challenge: The competitors met outside the Griffith Observatory and competed in a mise en place race. The race consisted of three tasks: turn three artichokes, supreme five oranges, and shell twenty almonds. The first five chefs to complete the artichokes became one team and could leave for the Top Chef kitchen immediately to begin cooking. Likewise, the first five chefs to complete the oranges became the second team, while the rest became the third team. Once the third team entered the kitchen, all teams had fifteen minutes to make two dishes featuring their prepped ingredients. Instead of immunity from elimination, the winners received an advantage in the Elimination Challenge.: Red Team: Bryan, Jamie, Joe, Kevin, Melissa; Blue Team: Brian, Karen, Lisa, Nini, Stephanie; Green Team: Angelo, Eric, Gregory, Jennifer, Lee Anne; Winning Team: Red Team (Char-Grilled Artichoke with Sumac, Yogurt & Tahini; Tortellono with Artichoke Barigoule with Pancetta Brodo); Elimination Challenge: Working in teams of three, the chefs created a family-style seafood feast for several noted chefs and restaurateurs at Cabrillo Beach, including Nancy Silverton, Marcus Samuelsson, Michael Cimarusti, Caroline Styne, Josiah Citrin, Suzanne Goin, and guest judge Jeremiah Tower. In addition, the teams were forced to use an open fire grill as their only heat source, with no access to electricity or appliances. The winners of the Quickfire Challenge became the team captains and selected their two teammates via schoolyard pick.: Red Team: Brian, Joe, Lee Anne; Blue Team: Jennifer, Kevin, Nini; Green Team: Angelo, Karen, Melissa; Yellow Team: Gregory, Jamie, Stephanie; Aqua Team: Bryan, Eric, Lisa; Winner: Gregory (Charred Salmon with Grilled Peaches & Roasted Chili Dressing); Eliminated: Joe (Sesame & Semolina Flatbread with Clams, Fried Garlic, Sea Urchin, Pickled Peppers & Miso Parmesan Aioli)
248	2	"The Jonathan Gold Standard"	March 26, 2020	0.82
Elimination Challenge: In honor of food critic and Pulitzer Prize winner Jonathan Gold, the chefs traveled around Los Angeles and sampled the various restaurants and food trucks written in his 2017 List of 101 Best Restaurants, his final guide list before his death in 2018. The contestants were then responsible for creating dishes inspired by their visits. The dishes were served to 200 guests at Union Station, including Jon Favreau, Roy Choi, Jeff Gordinier, Ludo Lefebvre, Nancy Silverton, Michael Cimarusti, and guest judge Ruth Reichl.: Winner: Kevin (Roasted Pork, Mushroom & Black Currant Terrine with "Granny's" Apple Butter); Eliminated: Angelo (Crudo of Tuna with Chilled Turmeric Coconut Broth & Jicama); Note: At the beginning of the episode, the show paid tribute to the memory of Top Chef Masters season 3 winner Floyd Cardoz, who died on March 25, 2020, during the COVID-19 pandemic.
249	3	"Strokes of Genius"	April 2, 2020	0.83
Quickfire Challenge: The chefs were tasked with making unique fried rice dishes incorporating at least one ingredient pre-selected by guest judges Ali Wong and Randall Park, which ranged from candies to fruits to offal. The winner received immunity from elimination.: Winner: Kevin ("Bachelor Fried Rice" with Wieners, Hot Cheese Puffs & Bourbon); Elimination Challenge: The chefs were randomly assigned one of four historical art movements: Baroque, Neoclassicism, Renaissance, and Rococo. After touring the J. Paul Getty Museum, they then had to create dishes inspired by their art movements. One chef from each group was eligible to win the challenge, while another was put up for elimination. As the winner of the Quickfire Challenge, Kevin was able to select which group he would compete against; he chose to compete in the Neoclassicism group. The dishes were served to several guest diners at the Vibiana social events venue, including Ray Garcia, Sara Hymanson, Sarah Kramer, Craig Thornton, and guest judge Ludo Lefebvre.: Baroque: Bryan, Jamie, Lisa; Neoclassicism: Eric, Jennifer, Karen, Kevin; Renaissance: Brian, Nini, Lee Anne; Rococo: Gregory, Melissa, Stephanie; Winner: Melissa (Lobster Wonton with Shellfish Consommé & Charred Allium Oil, Vegetables); Eliminated: Jamie (Seared Chicken Breast with Charred Citrus Gremolata, Butternut Squash, Glazed Vegetables & Arugula Purée)
250	4	"You're So Fresh!"	April 9, 2020	0.91
Quickfire Challenge: The chefs competed in a challenge themed after the animated musical film Trolls World Tour. The contestants were responsible for incorporating one ingredient from each of the six groups of ingredients, which were organized by color. The colors corresponded to the six "musical lands" visited by the protagonists during the film's plot: pink (pop), red (rock), orange (country), yellow (classical), blue (techno), and purple (funk). The guest judge for the challenge was singer-songwriter Kelly Clarkson.: Winner: Gregory (Butternut Squash & Plantain Soup with Pickled Apple, Figs, Blueberry & Fresno Chiles); Elimination Challenge: The chefs, split into two teams, prepared six-course progressive vegetarian meals for 40 guest diners, including guest judge Jeremy Fox. As an added obstacle, the chefs would not know what ingredients would be available to use until the morning of the challenge, when they shopped at the Santa Monica Farmers Market.: Red Team: Brian, Bryan, Lee Anne, Lisa, Nini, Stephanie; Blue Team: Eric, Gregory, Jennifer, Karen, Kevin, Melissa; Winner: Melissa (Coconut Corn Soup, Pickled Garlic Chives & Puffed Grains); Eliminated: Lisa (Chili Soy Brussels Sprouts with Apples and Pistachios)
251	5	"Bring Your Loved One to Work"	April 16, 2020	0.82
Quickfire Challenge: The chefs were tested on their communication skills by playing a game of telephone with their friends and family. Their loved ones were presented with one of three dishes at Nancy Silverton's restaurant Osteria Mozza. While talking to them over the phone, the chefs had to replicate their loved ones' assigned dish using only their verbal descriptions as guidance. The winner received immunity from elimination and US$10,000. Silverton herself acted as the guest judge for the episode.: Winner: Kevin (Rosemary-Basted Pork Chop, Radicchio, Prosciutto-Braised Beans & Fennel Pollen); Elimination Challenge: The chefs were responsible for creating their own signature specialty product, along with an accompanying dish, to sell at the Westfield Century City shopping mall. Each guest shopper was provided one ticket, which could be used to purchase one product. While the judges still selected their most and least favorite dishes, the chef who collected the most tickets received immunity from elimination. The contestants received assistance from their loves ones, who served as sous chefs for the challenge.: Immunity: Melissa (Product: Mel's Kimchi-Peach Vinaigrette; Dish: Korean Fried Chicken Wing); Winner: Gregory (Product: GG's Party Pikliz - The Spicy Haitian Pickle; Dish: Haitian Creole Chicken Marinated in Black Pepper, Thyme & Clove); Eliminated: Jennifer (Product: Sunny Lemon Ginger Love; Dish: "Sunny Style" Skirt Steak, Yogurt & Grilled Kale)
252	6	"Get Your Phil"	April 23, 2020	0.91
Quickfire Challenge: The chefs were asked to make dishes using alternative types of flour for guest judge Chris Bianco. The contestants were given access to a wide variety of non-wheat flours, including masa, coconut, rice, hazelnut, and blue corn, but were prohibited from using any all-purpose flour. Instead of immunity from elimination, the winner received US$5,000.: Winner: Gregory (Tapioca Flour: Nutty Tapioca Pancakes, Blueberry Compote & Maple Syrup); Elimination Challenge: The chefs were randomly assigned one of the five basic taste profiles: salty, sweet, sour, bitter, and umami. They were then required to form pairs and create dishes harmonizing their two different tastes. The dishes were served to the members of the Los Angeles Philharmonic and their conductor Gustavo Dudamel at the restaurant Otium, in celebration of the orchestra's 100th anniversary. The guest judge for the challenge was chef Timothy Hollingsworth. Both members of the losing team were eliminated.: Winners: Kevin, Melissa (Sweet/Salty: Fish Sauce Caramel-Roasted Cabbage with Apple & Cured Pork Crumble); Eliminated: Karen, Nini (Umami/Sour: Tomato Broth with Poached Cod & Pickled Cucumbers)
253	7	"Pitch Perfect"	April 30, 2020	0.89
Quickfire Challenge: Following her win in Episode 6 of Last Chance Kitchen, Karen rejoined the competition. The chefs were then tasked with making tacos for guest judge Danny Trejo. However, they were forced to use a machete as their only means of cutting. The winner received immunity from elimination.: Winner: Stephanie (Fresh Masa Corn Tortilla with Lamb, Grilled Cucumbers, Cilantro Cashews & Crema with Chipotle); Elimination Challenge: The chefs pitched their restaurant concepts for the upcoming Restaurant Wars challenge. The contestants had to present a menu and a mood board, alongside one or two dishes, to illustrate their visions to the judges. The top two concepts would be the restaurants built for Restaurant Wars. The guest judges for the challenge were Top Chef: Chicago winner Stephanie Izard and restaurateur Kevin Boehm.: Winners: Gregory (Kann, Haitian Woodfired Cuisine: Braised Oxtail, Sautéed Plantains with Caramel Onions; Marinated Red Snapper with Cilantro, Lime, Garlic, Ginger, Rice & Peas); Kevin (The Country Captain, Family-Style Southern Restaurant: "Country Captain" Braised & Roasted Curry Chicken with Bread & Butter Pickles, Hot Chow Chow); Eliminated: Eric (Middle Passage, Food from the African Diaspora: Tamarind-Glazed Duck with Coriander, Green Peppercorns, Cardamom & Collard Greens; Berbere Shrimp with Charred Vegetable Broth)
254	8	"Restaurant Wars"	May 7, 2020	0.94
Elimination Challenge: The chefs competed in Restaurant Wars, using the two restaurant concepts chosen by the judges during the previous Elimination Challenge. The teams were given 48 hours and US$4,000 each to transform empty spaces into functioning pop-up restaurants, including décor. Unlike previous seasons, the contestants had no restrictions on the number of dishes and courses needed to be served. The winning team received US$40,000. Stephanie Izard, Kevin Boehm, and restaurateur Rob Katz joined the judges as guest diners.: Kann: Brian (FOH), Gregory (EC), Lee Anne, Stephanie; First Course: Mixed Salad, Peanuts, Avocado, Crispy Peas & Habanero-Lime Dressing (Lee Anne); Salt-Cod Patties (Stephanie); "Pikliz" Spicy Vegetable Pickle (Stephanie); Fried Green Plantains (Stephanie); "Griot" Crispy Twice-Cooked Pork (Gregory); Second Course: Chicken Thighs Stewed with Smoked Peppers, Rice & "Sos Pwa" Kidney Bean Sauce (Gregory); Roasted Red Snapper Marinated in Scotch Bonnets & Cilantro with Caribbean Root Vegetables (Brian); Dessert: Rum Raisin Ice Cream with Pineapple Upside-Down Cake (Lee Anne); The Country Captain: Bryan, Karen (FOH), Kevin (EC), Melissa; First Course: Dungeness Crab Salad with Egg Yolk Pudding (Bryan); Smoked Trout Puff with Caviar (Bryan); Chicken Liver Mousse with Persimmon on Brioche (Melissa); Second Course: "Country Captain" Chicken Thighs Braised in Curry, Currants & Almonds with Roasted Chicken Breast (Kevin); Yellow Rice (Kevin); Creamed Corn with Shrimp (Bryan); "Dilly Beans" Pickled Field Peas (Bryan); Beef Tallow-Fried Potatoes with Raclette Béchamel (Melissa); Madeira-Glazed Mushrooms (Karen); Sweet & Spicy Red Pepper Relish (Karen); Cucumber Pickles with Vidalia Onions (Bryan); Dessert: Warm Banana Pudding with Toasted Meringue (Kevin); Winning Team: Kann; Eliminated: Kevin
255	9	"Cabin Fever"	May 14, 2020	0.89
Quickfire Challenge: The chefs traveled to the Pali Mountain Retreat, where they were challenged to create grilled dishes featuring beans for guest judge and Top Chef: Kentucky winner Kelsey Barnard Clark. The winner received US$10,000. Beginning with this challenge, immunity from elimination was no longer available as a reward.: Winner: Lee Anne (Cuban Black Bean Empanada, Purple Hull Pea Slaw with Mango Salsa Fresca); Elimination Challenge: The chefs catered a Sunday brunch buffet for 200 mothers vacationing at Pali Mountain Retreat, using the limited ingredients available in the camp kitchen pantry. Each chef was responsible for two dishes. The guest judge for the challenge was Top Chef: Charleston winner Brooke Williamson.: Winner: Bryan (Coriander-Roasted Carrots with Salsa Verde; Potato Shallot Cake, Gruyère Fondue & Braised Bacon Gravy); Eliminated: Lee Anne (Mixed Berry Clafoutis with Lemon, Thyme, Maple & Whipped Cream; Cinnamon Nutmeg Donut with Coffee Crème Anglaise)
256	10	"Colossal Coliseum Kaiseki"	May 21, 2020	0.84
Quickfire Challenge: The chefs were tasked with making desserts for guest judge Sherry Yard. While the contestants had access to basic pantry items, such as dairy, flour, sugar, and eggs, certain other ingredients, such as milk chocolate, peaches, ricotta, and pistachios, were prohibited from use unless correctly identified through a blindfolded taste test. Each person was given 5 minutes to guess 20 mystery ingredients. In addition, the chefs were assigned time limits based on their scores. The chefs with the two highest scores received an hour of cooking time, with the next pair receiving 45 minutes, and the last pair receiving 30 minutes. The winner received an advantage in the Elimination Challenge.: Winner: Melissa (Olive Oil Pistachio Cake with Egg Custard Ice Cream, Blackberries, Tarragon, Lemon Meringue); Elimination Challenge: In celebration of the 2020 Summer Olympics in Tokyo, Japan (prior to its postponement due to the COVID-19 pandemic), the chefs prepared a six-course kaiseki at the Los Angeles Memorial Coliseum for guest judges Niki Nakayama and Carole Iida-Nakayama, sportscaster Mike Tirico, and Olympic athletes Diana Taurasi, Rai Benjamin, Nastia Liukin, Ibtihaj Muhammad, Christian Coleman, and Kerri Walsh Jennings. Each chef was responsible for one course of the kaiseki, which consisted of sakizuke (appetizer), owan (soup), yakimono (flame-grilled), mushimono (steamed), shokuji (rice), and mizumono (dessert). As the winner of the Quickfire Challenge, Melissa was able to choose her own course and assign her competitors' courses. The winner received two tickets to the Olympics.: Winner: Stephanie (Mizumono: Panna Cotta with Yuzu Curd & Orange Granita); Eliminated: Karen (Yakimono: Jasmine Tea-Smoked Duck with Roasted & Fresh Grapes with Miso & Saba)
257	11	"Michael's Santa Monica"	May 28, 2020	0.90
Quickfire Challenge: After winning Last Chance Kitchen, Kevin rejoined the competition. The chefs then crafted elevated business class airline meals for guest judge Jonathan Waxman. The meals were required to include an appetizer or salad, alongside a main course. Following airline restrictions, the dishes could not exceed the height of the airline trays they were served in. The winner received an advantage in the Elimination Challenge.: Winner: Melissa (Appetizer: Tofu Salad with Yuzu & Chile; Main Course: Beef Curry with Mushrooms & Coconut Rice); Elimination Challenge: The chefs headed to Michael's Santa Monica, a restaurant credited with pioneering Californian cuisine, and sampled dishes created by notable Michael's alumni, including Waxman, Roy Yamaguchi, Sang Yoon, Mark Peel, Brooke Williamson, and restaurant owner Michael McCarty. Each chef was then responsible for reinterpreting one of the six Michael's dishes. The contestants drew knives to determine order of choice. As the winner of the Quickfire Challenge, Melissa was able to choose her dish first.: Winner: Melissa (Grilled Quail with Lime & Hot Plum Glaze, Ninja Radishes); Eliminated: Brian (Duo of Sweetbreads with Hollandaise & Champagne Gastrique; Veal Loin with Truffle Butternut Squash, Mushrooms & Warm Leak Potato Salad)
258	12	"Lucca"	June 4, 2020	0.84
Quickfire Challenge: The chefs were flown out to Italy for the remainder of the competition. The contestants then gathered at the Piazza dell'Anfiteatro in Lucca, where they were challenged to create an aperitivo which could pair with Peroni beer for guest judge Filippo Saporito and thirty locals. There were five cooking stations available, each containing a unique set of ingredients inspired by the five official regions of Italy: the northwest region (venison, tuna, frog legs, cheese); the northeast region (cold cuts, shellfish, polenta, radicchio); the central region (wild game, beef, mussels); the southern region (tomatoes, peppers, lamb, sardines); and the islands (seafood). The winner received US$10,000.: Winner: Kevin (Northeast Region: Creamy Polenta Topped with Prosciutto & Radicchio Agrodolce); Elimination Challenge: The chefs created dishes featuring white truffles for a Tuscan food festival held at the Palazzo Pfanner. The guest judges for the challenge included chef Cristiano Tomei and truffle hunter Cristiano Savini.: Winner: Melissa (Truffle Congee, Salami, Fried Garlic, Parsley, Quail Egg & White Truffle Butter); Eliminated: Gregory (Wild Boar with Tomato, Prunes, Cocoa & White Truffle Polenta)
259	13	"Parma"	June 11, 2020	0.99
Elimination Challenge: The chefs were treated to a culinary trip to Parma, the home of Parmigiano-Reggiano cheese and Prosciutto di Parma ham. After their tour, each contestant was responsible for serving a two-course Italian dinner highlighting Parma's two signature products. The guest judge for the challenge was chef Evan Funke.: Winner: Melissa (Primi: Chicken Anolini with Yuzu & Parmesan Brodo; Secondi: Scallops with Prosciutto XO Sauce & Radicchio); Eliminated: Kevin (Primi: Raviolo Filled with Cannellini Beans & Parmesan Whey Under Fresh Bean Ragu, Borlotti Bean Brodo, Parmesan; Secondi: Roasted Fresh Pork Coppa with Heirloom Apples & 36-Month Prosciutto)
260	14	"Finito!"	June 18, 2020	1.04
Elimination Challenge: The final three chefs had to cook the best four-course progressive meal of their lives. Each finalist received help from one sous chef, consisting of previously eliminated competitors Kevin, Brian, and Lee Anne (Gregory was unable to participate due to a back injury). Stephanie was assisted by Brian, Bryan was assisted by Kevin, and Melissa was assisted by Lee Anne. The meals were served to several renowned chefs, including Mauro Colagreco, Clare Smyth, Marcus Samuelsson, Janice Wong, and Tony Mantuano, butcher Dario Cecchini, and Food & Wine editor-in-chief Hunter Lewis.: Bryan: First Course: Beets with Tonnato, Spicy Arugula & Bonito Aioli; Second Course: Lasagna with Wild Boar Bolognese, Porcini Duxelles, Tuscan Kale & Ricotta Béchamel; Third Course: Blackened Monkfish with "Cacciucco" Broth, Octopus, Calamari & Squid Ink Focaccia; Fourth Course: Malted Chocolate Mousse, Hazelnut Ice Cream, Coffee & Cardamom Soil; Melissa: First Course: Char Sui-Glazed Octopus, Fried Shallots, Fennel, Pickled Peppers & Herbs; Second Course: Squash Agnolotti, Chicken Skin, Agrodolce Cipollinis, Sichuan Chili Oil, Shiso & Squash Blossoms; Third Course: Grilled Squab with Persimmon, Porcini & Fermented Black Bean Sauce; Fourth Course: Hong Kong Milk Tea Tiramisu; Stephanie: First Course: Kataifi-Wrapped Shrimp with Tangerine Syrup, Pickled Calabrian Chiles & Spicy Arugula; Second Course: Taleggio Cappelletti, Roasted Chicken Broth, Pumpkin, Apple, Prosciutto & Celery; Third Course: Milk-Braised Veal Breast, Parisian Gnocchi & Lemon-Rosemary Sauce; Fourth Course: Sticky Toffee Pudding, Hazelnuts & Yogurt Ice Cream; Winner: Melissa; Runners-up: Bryan, Stephanie

== Last Chance Kitchen ==
No.	Title	Original air date
1	"The Road to Redemption"	March 26, 2020
Challenge: After arriving at Michael Cimarusti's restaurant, Providence, the chefs were given 30 minutes to cook seafood dishes using some of Cimarusti's favorite ingredients: geoduck, oysters, caviar, celtuce, and yuzu.: Angelo: Scrambled Eggs with Caviar & Yuzu Cream; Joe: Grilled Geoduck with Celtuce Purée; Winner: Joe; Eliminated: Angelo
2	"A Game of Chicken"	April 2, 2020
Challenge: The chefs were asked to create dishes using chicken. To determine their time and ingredient limit, the contestants played a game of chicken with each other; they chose to work with a 20-minute timer and only seven ingredients, including the chicken and seasonings.: Joe: Liver & Chicken Thighs with Leeks, Thyme & Lemon; Jamie: Grilled Chicken Breast, Tomato & Jalapeño Sauce with Sautéed Livers; Winner: Joe; Eliminated: Jamie
3	"Fry or Die"	April 9, 2020
Challenge: The chefs had 30 minutes to serve dishes using the deep fryer as their only cooking element.: Joe: Fried Goat Cheese & Mozzarella with Tomato & Corn Jam; Lisa: Fried Pork Chop with Potato Latkes, Apple Sauce & Fried Brussels Sprouts; Winner: Lisa; Eliminated: Joe
4	"Wait...Tom's Cooking?"	April 16, 2020
Challenge: The chefs created their own sauces to be served alongside a protein prepared by Colicchio. The sauces had to be complete by the time Colicchio finished cooking.: Lisa: Maggi Chimichurri Sauce; Jennifer: Beef Sauce with Harissa, Lemon, Ginger, Garlic & Date Au Jus; Winner: Lisa; Eliminated: Jennifer
5	"Two Friends Enter..."	April 23, 2020
Challenge: The chefs had 30 minutes to produce sweet and sour dishes. Two chefs would advance to the next round.: Lisa: Tamarind Scallops with Kaffir Lime Potato Chips; Karen: Sweet & Sour Shrimp with Pickled Pineapples; Nini: Skirt Steak with Caramelized Onions & Grilled Fennel Salad; Winner: Karen; Eliminated: Lisa
6	"Kick Down the Doors and Say, "I'm Back""	April 23, 2020
Challenge: The chefs had 45 minutes to cook family-style meals for Colicchio and the other eliminated contestants. The winner returned to the main competition.: Karen: Crispy Branzino with Salsa Verde, Aglio e Olio Pomodoro with Balsamic-Roasted Fennel; Nini: Green Curry Chicken with Delicata Squash, Green Mango Salad & Jasmine Rice; Winner: Karen
7	"Colicchio Wants Italian"	April 30, 2020
Challenge: The chefs had 30 minutes to create dishes matching Colicchio's restaurant concept, "coastal Italian seafood".: Nini: Seared Sea Bream with Delicata Squash & Bagna Càuda Aioli; Eric: Clams, Mussels & Seared Black Cod in Fennel, Rhubarb & Tomato Broth; Winner: Nini; Eliminated: Eric
8	"Battle Down Memory Lane"	May 7, 2020
Challenge: The chefs had 30 minutes to modernize their favorite childhood dishes.: Nini: Southern-Style Fried Chicken with Ginger and Pickled Cabbage; Kevin: Ham Fat-Roasted Trout with Creamed Corn & Tomato Salad; Winner: Kevin; Eliminated: Nini
9	"Eggs 3 Ways Race"	May 14, 2020
Challenge: The chefs had 30 minutes to create three perfect egg dishes: an over easy egg, a French omelette, and Eggs Benedict. While the over easy egg and French omelette had to be made with no accoutrements, the contestants had free rein on their Eggs Benedict dishes.: Over Easy Egg: Winner: Kevin; French Omelette: Winner: Lee Anne; Eggs Benedict: Kevin: Roasted Asparagus, Prosciutto, Poached Egg & Fried English Muffin; Lee Anne: Asparagus, Pancetta Eggs Benedict with Nori & Miso Hollandaise; Winner: Kevin; Eliminated: Lee Anne
10	"Tea Up for the Finals"	May 21, 2020
Challenge: The chefs had 30 minutes to make dishes highlighting tea.: Kevin: Roasted Tuna in Hibiscus & Mint Tea Broth with Apple, Pistachios & Tahini; Karen: Poached Cod in Lemongrass & Ginger Tea with Turmeric Ginger Broth; Winner: Kevin; Eliminated: Karen
11	"No Small Feat for the Uneliminated"	May 21, 2020
Challenge: The last remaining chef competed head-to-head against three non-eliminated contestants of their choosing. In each round, the non-eliminated chef selected one of four themed sets of ingredients to work with: root vegetables, shellfish, fruits and nuts, or stinky ingredients. Colicchio then decided which dish the two competitors would have to make. To earn their spot back into the main competition, the eliminated chef was required to win two out of three rounds. The chefs had 30 minutes each for all three rounds.: Round 1 (Shellfish Risotto): Kevin: Saffron & Crab Risotto with Beurre Monté Sauce; Brian: Tarragon, Fennel & Lobster Risotto; Winner: Kevin; Round 2 (Stinky Soup): Kevin: Vegetable Soup with Tomato, Fish Sauce, Shrimp Paste, Cabbage, Blue Cheese & Kale; Bryan: Curry Delicata Squash Soup with Scallop, Fish Sauce & Shrimp Paste; Winner: Bryan; Round 3 (Fruits and Nuts Dough): Kevin: Pear & Walnut Cobbler with Whipped Mascarpone Cream; Gregory: Cold Coconut Milk Fruit Soup with Rice Dumplings; Winner: Kevin
