= Nightshade (Los Angeles restaurant) =

Restaurant information
- Established: January 2, 2019
- Owners: Rick Singer; Mei Lin
- Food type: Asian cuisine
- Location: 923 East 3rd Street, Suite 109, Los Angeles, Los Angeles, California, 90013, United States
- Reservations: Yes
- Website: nightshade.wa-cafe.com

Nightshade was an American Asian cuisine restaurant based in Los Angeles, California, the co-owner and head chef was Top Chef winner Mei Lin.

Nightshade was officially opened in the Los Angeles Arts District on January 2, 2019.

== Accolades ==
In 2019, Eater dubbed Nighshade as Los Angeles' the Restaurant of the Year.

In 2020, Nightshade was named a James Beard Foundation Award finalist for Best New Restaurant.

== Critical reception ==
Both the Los Angeles Times and Los Angeles magazine gave Nightshade positive reviews.

Conversely, The Infatuation restaurant website said "Nightshade has some impressive elements - mostly the food - going for it. But right now, it all adds up to an experience that’s too generic to feel truly memorable."

== Closing ==
Nightshade officially closed in 2020 due to COVID-19.
