= Caroline Styne =

Restaurateur and sommelier in Los Angeles

Caroline Styne is a restaurateur and sommelier in Los Angeles. With her business partner Suzanne Goin she operates Lucques, A.O.C., Tavern, and The Larder. She won a James Beard Award for Outstanding Restaurateur in 2018.

== Early life and education ==
Styne was raised in Los Angeles. She worked as a waitress while in college. She is a master sommelier.

== Career ==
Styne started working in foodservice in 1989 at the age of 22 when she cofounded Basically Baked Inc., which distributed specialty food items to retail outlets. She developed a baked tortilla chip which was one of the first of its kind. She sold the company in 1992, after which she started a catering company, Food Concepts. From 1994 thru 1997 she worked as a manager at Jones Hollywood for Sean MacPherson, during which period the restaurant was 80% destroyed by a fire. The rebuilding process was "a crash course in building a restaurant" for Styne, who managed the process in six weeks.

In 1997 she met Goin, who was then working at Campanile. According to Styne, LA's dining scene at the time was "either super casual or super fussy," and both women envisioned something in between. Styne and Goin opened Lucques on Melrose Avenue in 1998. It offered one of LA's early market-driven menus. On 11 March 2020 they announced the restaurant would close on 6 May.

Styne and Goin opened A.O.C. in 2002. Food & Wine called A.O.C. "a pioneering restaurant that was at the forefront of small-plates dining in LA" and said the restaurant "changed the way LA dined." Johnathan Gold said of it, "If we've lived through a battle for L.A.'s restaurant soul, Goin and Styne have won."

She and Goin opened Tavern in 2009 and in 2014, The Larder. In 2015 they took over food service at the Hollywood Bowl.

In 2019 Syne predicted Albariño could become "the new Chablis or the new Burgundy." She was a guest judge on Top Chef: All-Stars L.A. She writes wine notes for Goin's cookbooks.

During the 2020 coronavirus pandemic she was involved in leading the Independent Restaurant Coalition, an industry group founded during the pandemic to lobby the federal government for relief for restaurants and their employees.

== Honors ==
In 2018 Styne won a James Beard Award for Outstanding Restaurateur. She was a semifinalist for the same award in 2014.

== Personal life ==
Styne is married to Michael Kohn, an art dealer. They live in a 1926 home in Hancock Park and have two children.
