= Departure Restaurant and Lounge =

Restaurant in Portland, Oregon, U.S.

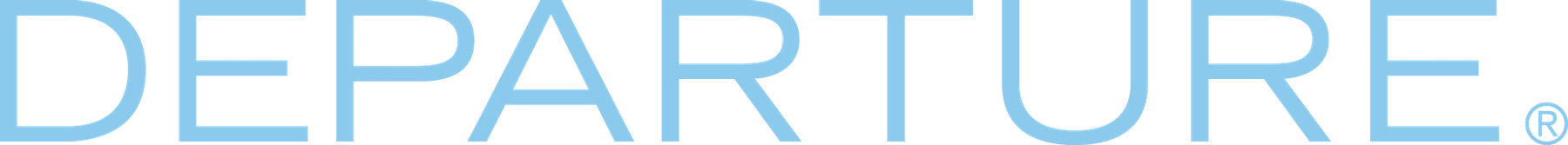

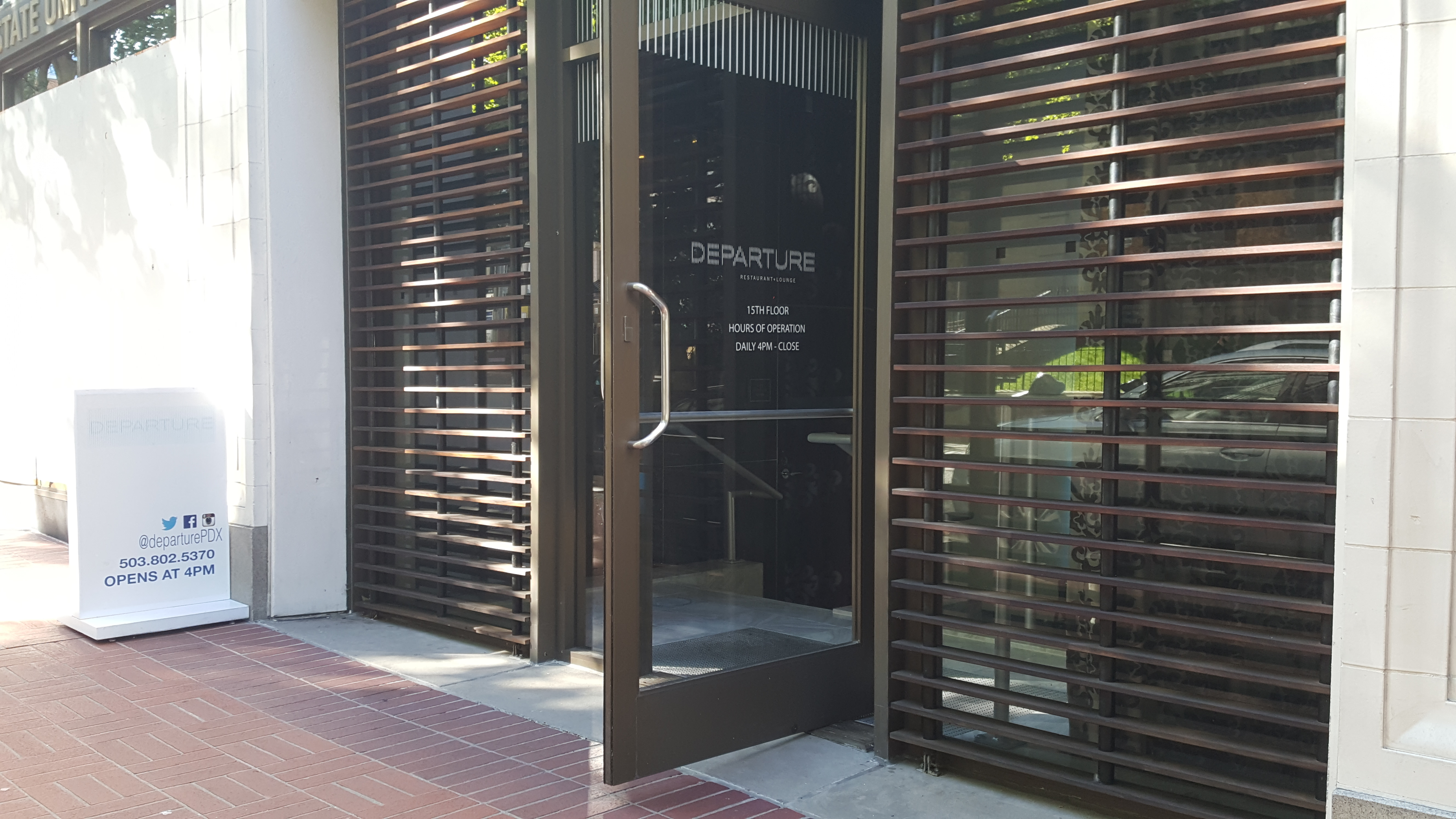
- Street level entrance and signage, 2020
- Interactive map of Departure Restaurant and Lounge

Restaurant information
- Location: 525 Southwest Morrison Street, Portland, Multnomah, Oregon, 97204, United States
- Coordinates: 45.518951°N 122.677804°W
- Website: departureportland.com

Departure Restaurant and Lounge, or simply Departure, is an Asian restaurant and bar in Portland, Oregon, United States. The restaurant operates on the fifteenth floor of The Nines.

== Description ==
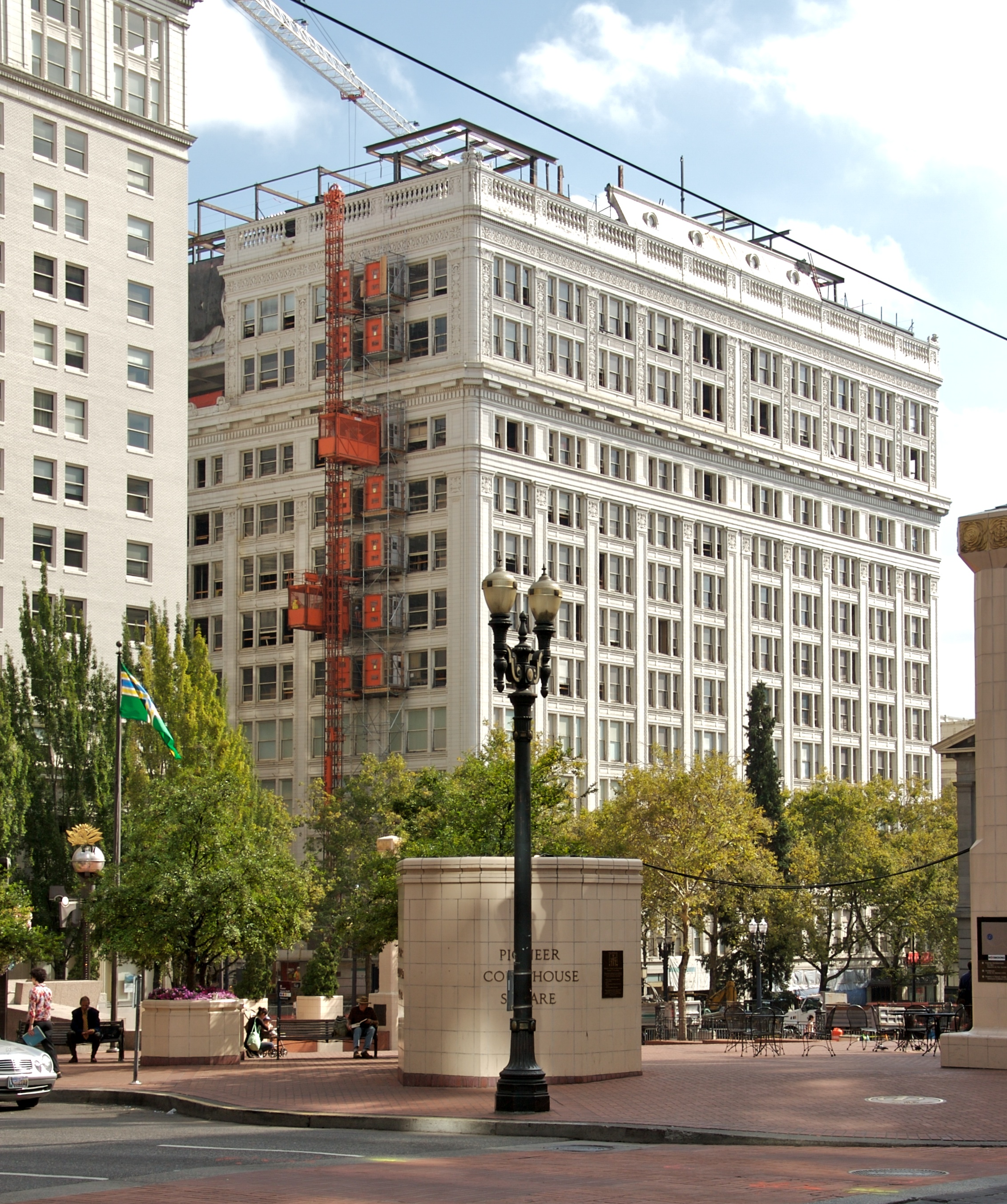
The Meier & Frank Building in 2007

Departure is an Asian restaurant and bar on the fifteenth floor of The Nines, a hotel in downtown Portland's Meier & Frank Building. Portland Monthly describes the restaurant as "a lively hub for creative, ambitious pan-Asian cuisine, a spot where Oregon’s produce, meats, and seafood are transmuted into bold yet comforting dishes that sizzle and pop with the big, bright flavors of chile, lime, and ginger". The menu "encompasses China (spring rolls, siu mai, fried rice) Japan (edamame, sashimi, kushiyaki) and Korea (a good bibimbap, stirred table-side)", and offers vegetarian and vegan options. According to The Oregonian's Michael Russell, Departure has a "Miami vibe" and "Asian-influenced" small plates.

== History ==
Gregory Gourdet began serving as chef in 2010, when the "astro-sleek" restaurant "was better known for its bridge-and-tunnel singles scene than for its eats". Departure closed temporarily during the COVID-19 pandemic, but reopened on August 13, 2020.

== Reception ==
According to Portland Monthly, "Visiting the restaurant, with its Vegas-style decks and unparalleled views of the city, is an expensive but giddy-making surprise: it's as if you went into a dressing room to try on a pair of gaudy Ed Hardy jeans and came out clad in an Armani suit." Michael Russell of The Oregonian wrote, "If you're interested in this kind of modern Asian fusion in Portland, you might be better off at Smallwares, Expatriate or The American Local, where the bill will be considerably lower. Then again, so will the view." Donald Olson of Frommer's rated Departure two out of three stars, and wrote, "This rooftop bar and restaurant atop The Nines hotel in downtown Portland serves good food but also has a remarkable outdoor terrace, very unusual in Portland. People definitely get dressed up to make the scene here, and most of them are under 40–er, make that 30."
