= Kann (restaurant) =

Haitian restaurant in Portland, Oregon, U.S.

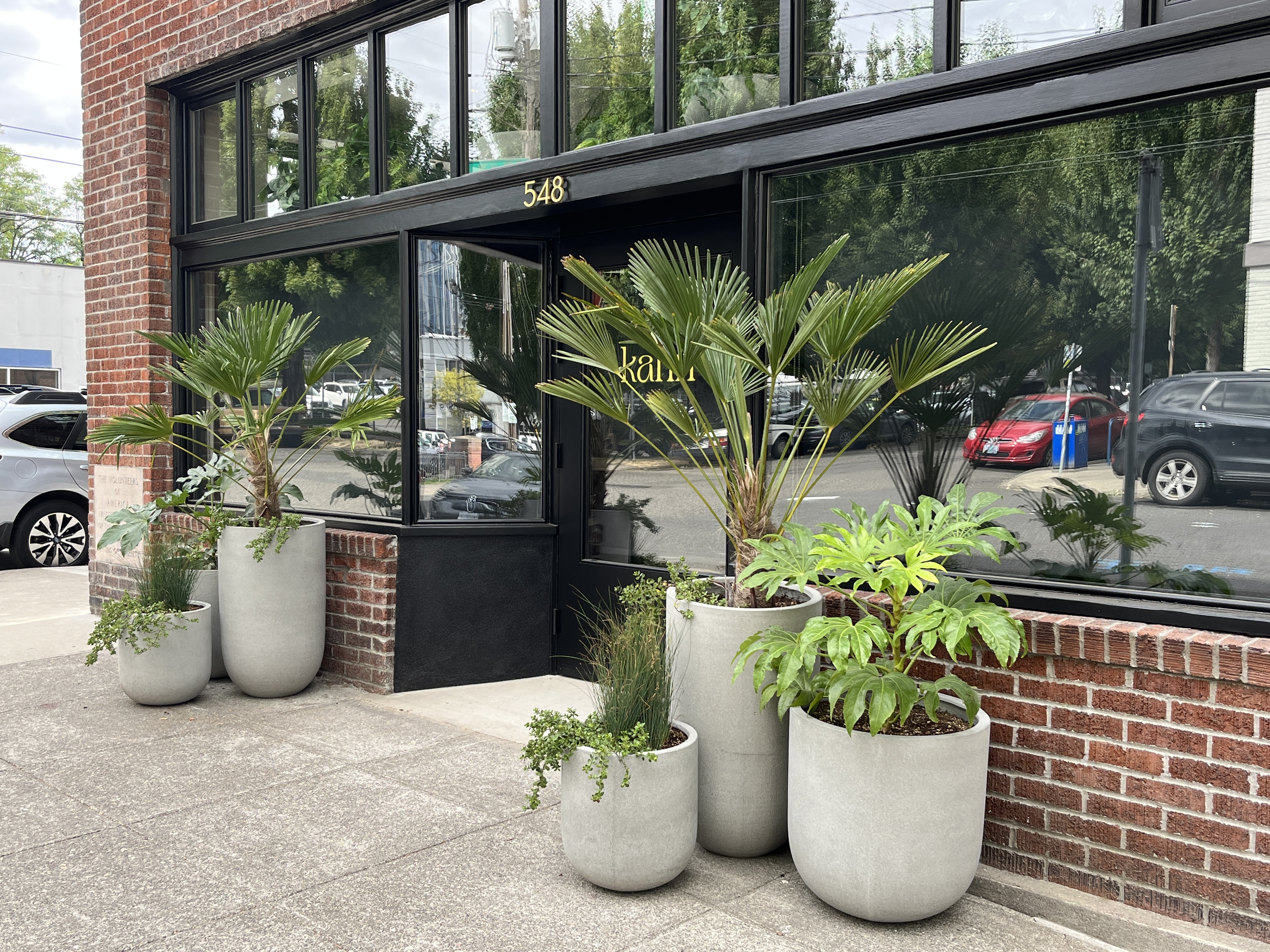
- The restaurant's exterior, August 2022
- Interactive map of Kann

Restaurant information
- Owner: Gregory Gourdet
- Food type: Haitian
- Location: 548 Southeast Ash Street, Portland, Multnomah, Oregon, United States
- Coordinates: 45°31′17″N 122°39′36″W
- Website: kannrestaurant.com

Kann is a Haitian restaurant by Gregory Gourdet in Portland, Oregon, United States.

== Description ==
The restaurant's name means "cane" or "sugarcane" in Haitian Creole. Downstairs is Sousòl, a pan-Caribbean cocktail bar.

Kann Winter Village's menu included chicken soup with epis-rubbed thighs, potato dumplings, and root vegetables.

The restaurant is LGBTQ-owned.

== History ==
In 2019, Gourdet announced plans to open Kann in 2020. However, the COVID-19 pandemic forced delays. During the pandemic, Gourdet hosted pop-up restaurants, including Kann Winter Village, which was sponsored by American Express and operated within yurts in the Redd on Salmon Street parking lot. American Express platinum card holders were given early reservation access, followed by other card holders, before opening up to the general public. Kann Winter Village operated for five months. Initially announced to open in July 2022, the brick and mortar restaurant began operating on August 4.

In 2023, Kann and Deadstock Coffee collaborated to launch a custom coffee blend.

== Reception ==
Waz Wu included Kann in Eater Portland's 2023 list of "Portland's Primo Special Occasion Restaurants for Vegans and Vegetarians". Katrina Yentch included Kann in the website's 2025 overview of the best restaurants in the Buckman neighborhood. Rebecca Roland also included the baked Haiti in Eater Portland's 2025 overview of the city's eleven best restaurants for desserts. Sararosa Davies included Kann in the website's 2025 overview of the city's best gluten-free restaurants and bakeries.

Kann received the 2023 James Beard Award for Best New Restaurant, presented by the James Beard Foundation. Michael Russell included the baked Haiti in The Oregonian's list of Portland's ten best dishes of 2024. He also included the business in the newspaper's 2025 list of the 21 best restaurants in southeast Portland. Russell ranked Kann number 40 in the newspaper's 2025 list of Portland's 40 best restaurants.

Kann was included in The Infatuation's 2024 list of Portland's best restaurants. The business ranked number 4 in Resy's 2025 list of the nation's top 100 dining destinations. Kann ranked first in the Best Gluten-Free Restaurant category of Willamette Week's annual 'Best of Portland' readers' poll in 2025. Hannah Wallace included the business in Condé Nast Traveler's 2025 list of Portland's 23 best restaurants. The business was included in Portland Monthly's 2025 list of 25 restaurants "that made Portland".
