= Kevin Boehm =

American restaurateur

Kevin Boehm is an American restaurateur who is the co-founder and co-owner of Boka Restaurant Group and the Independent Restaurant Coalition. With his business partner, Rob Katz, he operates 35 restaurants in Chicago, Los Angeles, New York and several other cities. Kevin, along with his business partner, won the James Beard Award for Outstanding Restaurateur in America in 2018.

== Early life and education ==
Boehm was raised in Springfield, Illinois. He attended the University of Illinois. He received an honorary doctorate to National Louis University in 2025.

== Career ==
In 1993 Boehm opened his first restaurant on money he had saved as a server and bartender. He opened restaurants in Seaside, Florida, Springfield, Illinois, and Nashville Tennessee before founding Boka Restaurant Group with Rob Katz in 2002. Boehm has been featured as a judge on two episodes of Top Chef and one episode of Top Chef Canada. He also played himself in Episode 10 of Season 3 of “The Bear.”

As a writer, Boehm has had pieces published in Esquire Magazine, McSweeney's, Plate Magazine, and the Chicago Sun Times. He is also a contributing writer for Fast Company. Kevin’s first book, a memoir, was published by Abrams Press in November of 2025. It was named one of Bloomberg’s best books of the year

During the 2020 coronavirus pandemic, he co-founded and was involved in leading the Independent Restaurant Coalition, an industry group founded during the pandemic to lobby the federal government for relief for restaurants and their employees, which culminated in $28.6 Billion in grants being given out by the federal government.

== Honors ==
In 2018 Boehm won the James Beard Award for Outstanding Restaurateur, after being a finalist in 2015, 2016, and 2017. Boka Restaurant has been awarded one Michelin star for fifteen consecutive years.

== Personal life ==
Boehm lives in Chicago in the neighborhood of River North, and is divorced with three children, Sofia, Lola, and Luca

== See also ==
- James Beard Award
- Top Chef: All-Stars L.A.
- Michelin Stars
- Food & Wines
