= Meier & Frank Building =

Historic building in Portland, Oregon, U.S.

- U.S. National Register of Historic Places
- Portland Historic Landmark
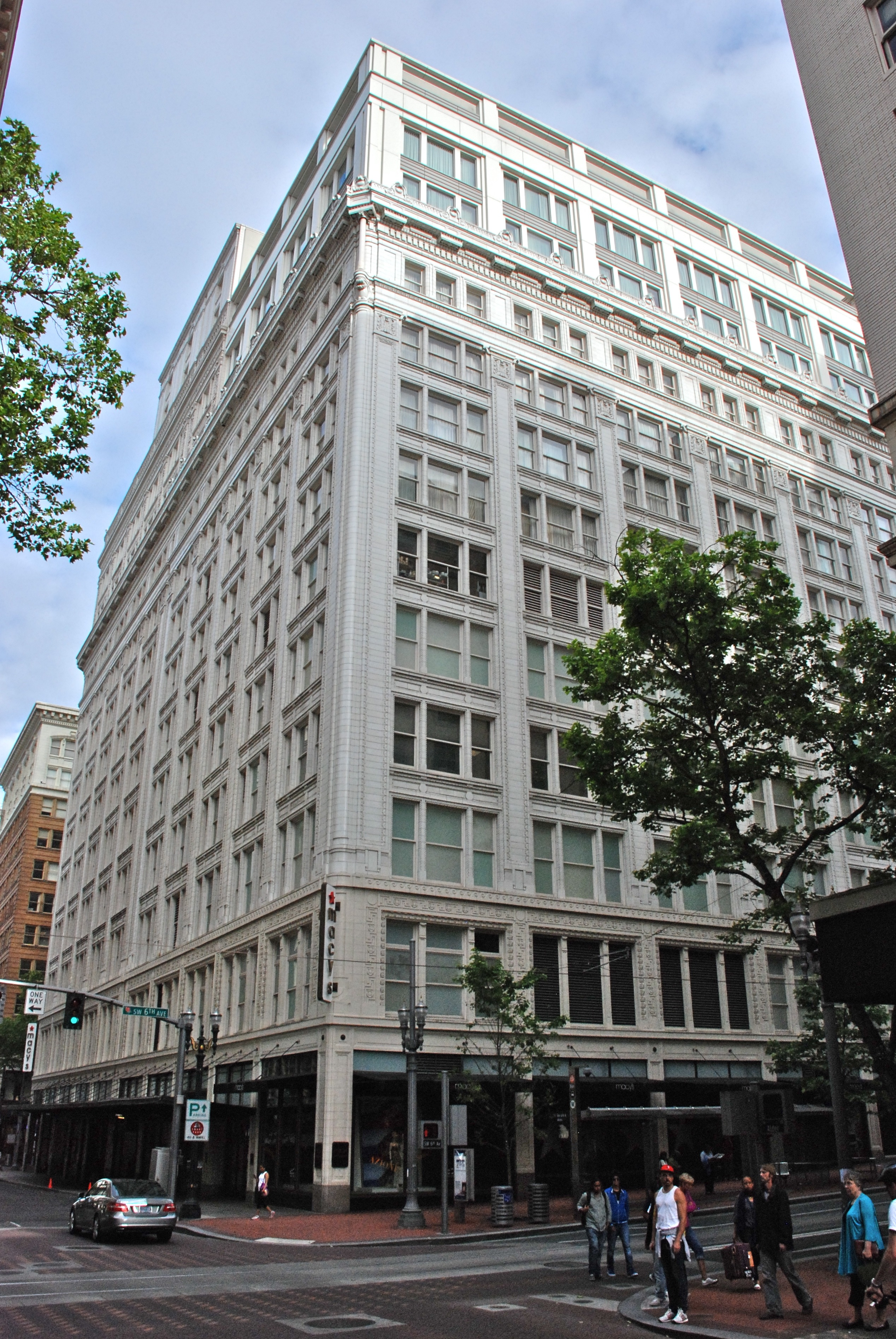
- Meier & Frank Building (from Alder St.) in 2012

- Location within Portland, Oregon Location within Oregon Location within the United States
- Location: 621 SW 5th Avenue; Portland, Oregon
- Coordinates: 45°31′09″N 122°40′41″W
- Built: 1909; expansions in 1915, 1932
- Built by: Dinwiddie Construction Company (1909 portion)
- Architect: Doyle & Patterson, et al.
- Architectural style: Commercial style (Chicago school)
- NRHP reference No.: 82003744
- Added to NRHP: July 8, 1982

The Meier & Frank Building is a fifteen-story, glazed terra cotta building located in downtown Portland, Oregon, across from the northeast corner of Pioneer Courthouse Square. The building is the former flagship store and headquarters building for the Meier & Frank department store chain, which was taken over by Macy's in 2006. In 2006–2007, the building's lower five floors were remodeled as a Macy's, while the upper eleven floors were renovated in 2008 into a luxury hotel known as The Nines. Macy's closed in April 2017 and the lower levels were rebuilt as office space.

The building site is a full block, bounded by SW Fifth and Sixth Avenues and Morrison and Alder Streets. The present building was constructed in stages, starting in 1909 with major expansions occurring in 1915 and 1932. It replaced an earlier Meier and Frank store built in 1898.

== History ==
The project was the first major commission for prolific Portland architect, A. E. Doyle. Although the original commission was an annex to the original building, Doyle took a trip to Chicago with the company's co-founder Sigmund Frank to survey department stores. Frank was very impressed with what he saw, and plans for the building changed into a full-block fully modern department store. Frank's death in 1910 ended those plans and resulted in the building's construction in piecemeal segments over several decades, which led to anomalous differences between which elevators and stairways reached other floors. However, A.E. Doyle first used glazed terra-cotta in this building, resulting in later use of it in many other Portland structures by his and other firms.

The building hosted the corporate headquarters of the Meier & Frank chain. After the acquisition of Meier and Frank by May Department Stores in 1966, the chain became a division which was based out of the former corporate offices.

The interior of the building has been modernized over the years with few interior historic elements remaining. However, several notable exceptions to this were the Georgian Room restaurant and seasonal Santaland, both on the 10th floor (highest retail floor in the building). The historic Georgian Room had remained virtually unchanged for at least the last 50 years. Santaland, which closed after the 2005 Christmas season, was an annual holiday favorite for generations of Portland families. Santaland operated a "kiddie"-sized overhead monorail around the ceiling of Santaland; first installed in 1959, it last operated during the 2005 holiday season. There was also a holiday model railroad layout and Santa Clauses. Pneumatic tubes were used throughout the store to convey messages and money from upper to lower floors and back again. The remnants of this system could still be found in some stairwells and back areas.

The Meier & Frank Building featured the first escalator installation in Portland, and housed the company's own radio station. KFEC signed on the air October 19, 1922. The studio was on the 5th floor and was also used as the library and reading room for employees. The transmitter towers were atop the building. KFEC operated until March 22, 1929, when it was sold and moved to Yakima, Washington, which still operates today as KIT.

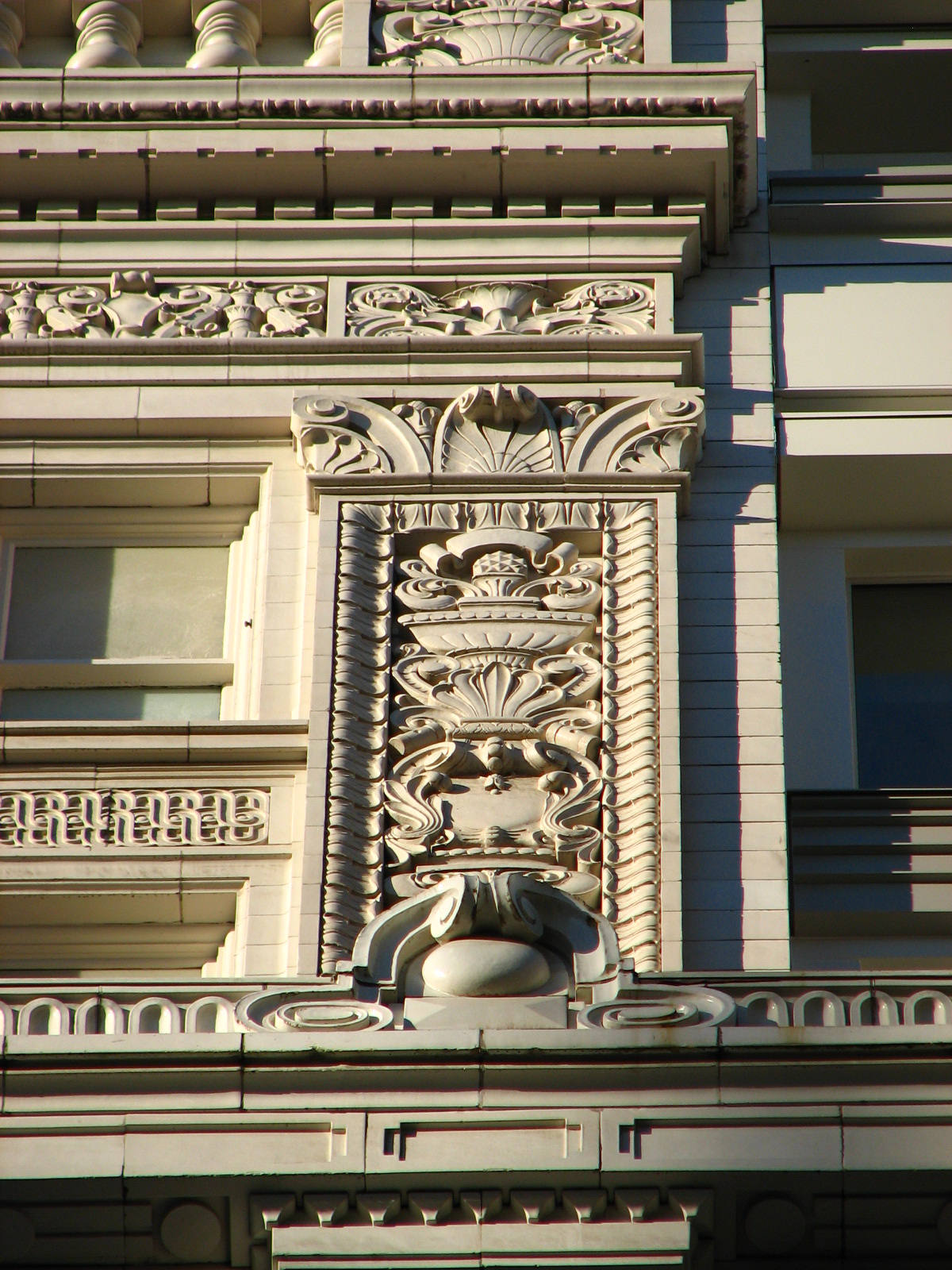
Detail of terracotta.

Until August 1962, the building at 223 feet (68 m) was the second tallest in Portland after the Public Service Building. The building has two primary lower levels and a third service level beneath these. The first lower level was used for retail space until the mid-1980s. The levels beneath that were used for storage and various seasonal needs. The bank of hand-controlled elevators originally operated by store employees was closed to the public with the construction of new automatic elevators, but were still used to transport merchandise into the 1990s out of public view.

At its peak, the store housed everything from a pharmacy to a pet store. Actor Clark Gable worked in the store's tie department in 1922. Several delis and food vendors operated out of various levels. As demand for these services declined, the store changed focus. During the 1980s the store began to concentrate more on soft lines such as clothing, as well as small goods such as housewares. Several floors were modified to serve as corporate offices. Other floors were simply shut down and turned over to cold storage. The store was able to operate in this configuration until finally doomed by the development of the nearby Pioneer Place mall and increased competition from stores such as Saks Fifth Avenue and Nordstrom.

The building was placed on the National Register of Historic Places in 1982.

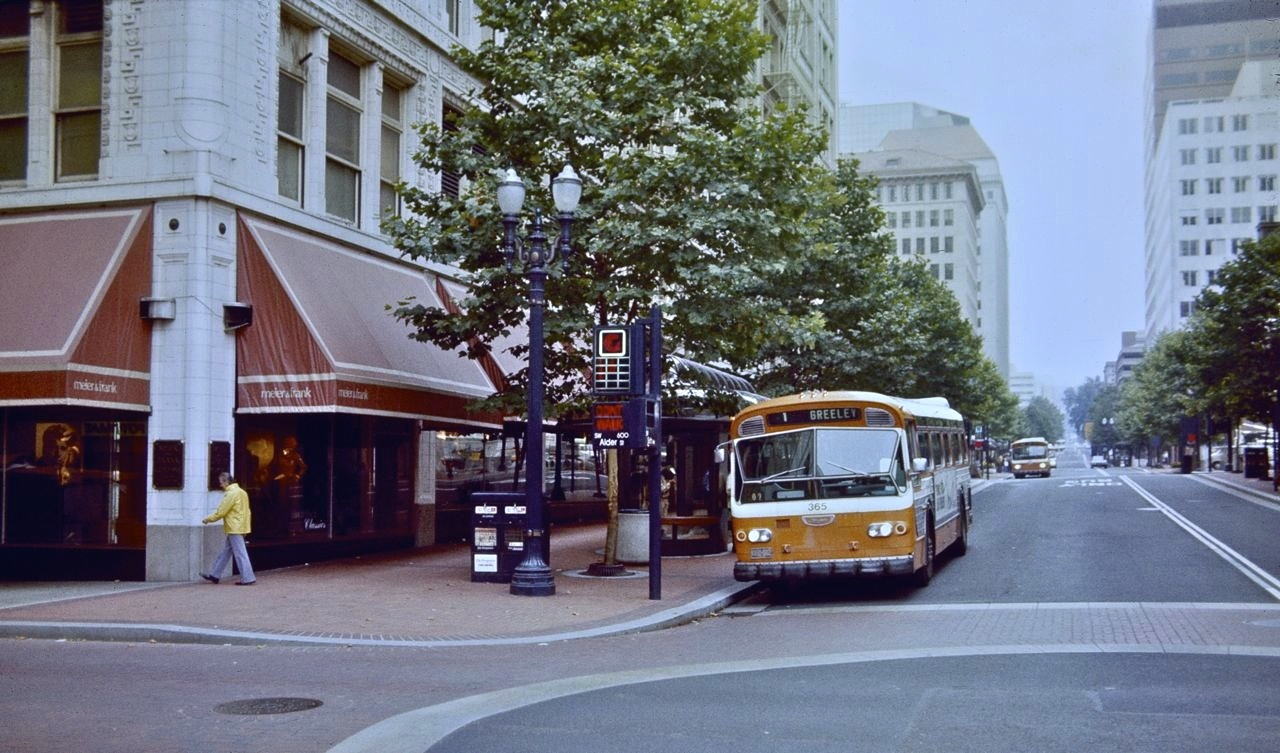
6th & Alder corner of Meier & Frank in 1982, with a bus on the Portland Mall

In 2005, the May Company was acquired by Federated Department Stores, corporate parent of Macy's and other chains. The Meier & Frank stores were renamed Macy's in September 2006. Already in late 2005, a $100 million (~$154 million in 2024) renovation of the building began, and this was to include work to turn the top nine floors of the building into a 330-room luxury hotel called The Nines, a member of The Luxury Collection. Renovation of the Meier & Frank store in the lower floors of the building began first, in late 2005, and was still under way when the store was rebranded in September 2006 as a Macy's (as were all other then-remaining Meier & Frank stores). Macy's later decided to temporarily close the store, in order to accelerate the remodeling work, and the temporary closure began in December 2006. The remodeled store, named Macy's at Meier and Frank Square, reopened on October 26, 2007. The hotel opened in late summer 2008.

In 2016, Macy's announced that it planned to close the store in spring 2017, because of declining sales. A clearance sale began in January, and the store closed permanently in April 2017. The lower five floors were rebuilt as office space.

In March 2018, Japanese retailer Muji announced they would be taking over 15,000 square feet in the building to open their first store in the Pacific Northwest.

== Other historic buildings ==
Meier and Frank also owned and operated two other buildings in the downtown area, namely, the Delivery Depot and Warehouse, both of which are now listed on the National Register of Historic Places. Both structures have been transformed into other uses.

On August 18, 2010, Vestas Wind Systems, a Danish wind turbine manufacturer, announced that it will lease the historic Meier & Frank Delivery Depot in the Pearl District. After renovations completed in 2012, the 172,000-square-foot (16,000 m^{2}) space now houses the company's U.S. headquarters.

== See also ==
- Architecture of Portland, Oregon
- Departure Restaurant and Lounge
- Urban Farmer
