= Urban Farmer =

American restaurant chain

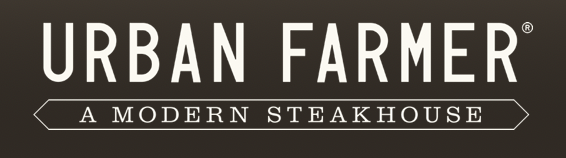

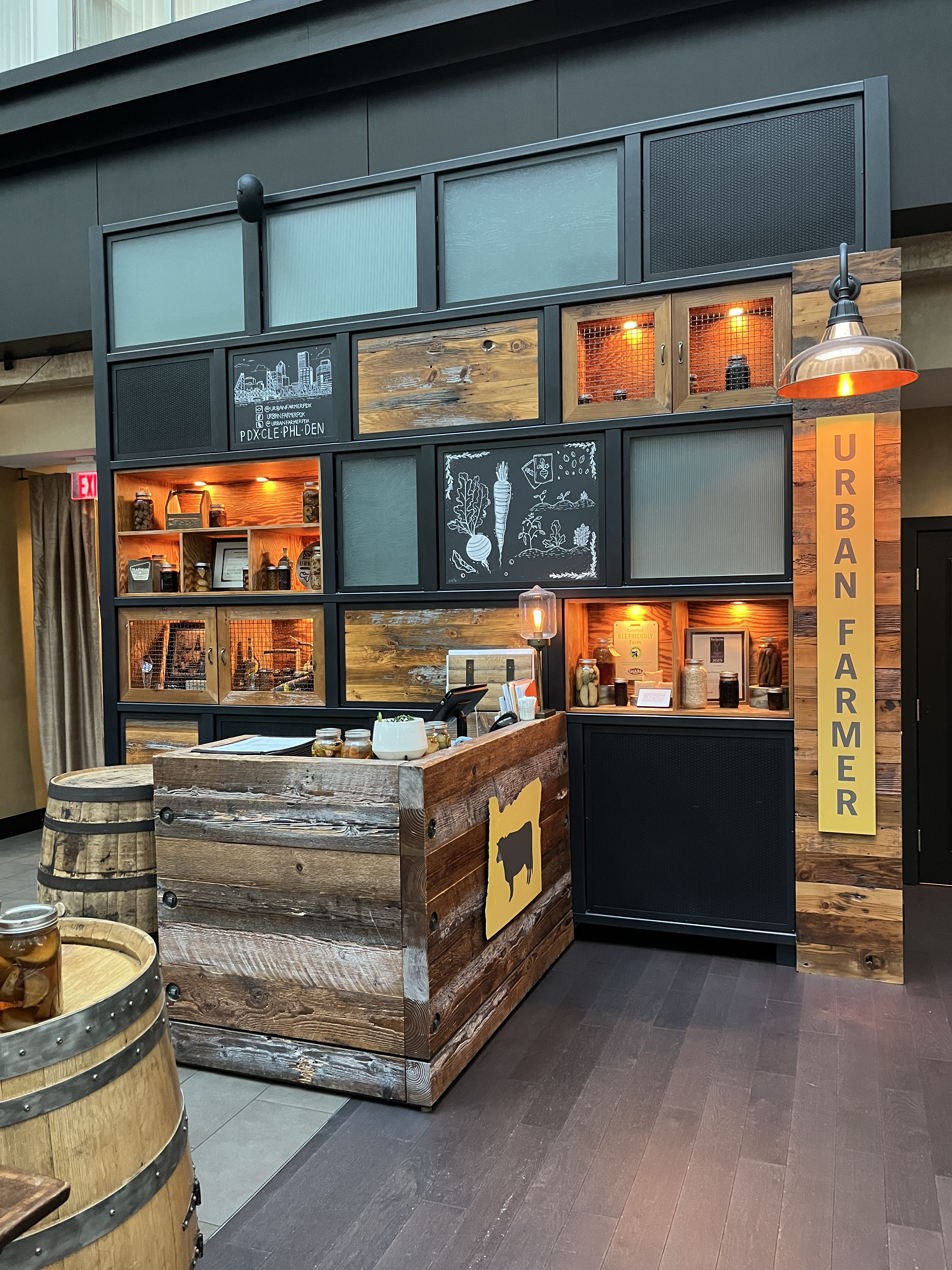
- Urban Farmer in Portland, Oregon
- Company type: Private
- Founders: Peter Karpinski
- Headquarters: Denver, Colorado, U.S.
- Number of locations: 3 (2023)
- Key people: Chris Jaromin (CEO)
- Website: www.urbanfarmersteakhouse.com

Urban Farmer is a chain of three restaurants in Denver, Philadelphia, and Portland, Oregon. A fourth location located in Cleveland closed in 2021.

Matt Christianson has served as the brand's executive chef and director of culinary operations.

== Locations ==
The Denver restaurant opened in the Oxford Hotel in 2017.

The Philadelphia restaurant is located in Logan Square.

The Portland restaurant operates from the eighth floor of The Nines, a hotel in downtown Portland's Meier & Frank Building. In 2009, The Oregonian's David Sarasohn gave the restaurant a 'B−' rating. Urban Farmer closed during the COVID-19 pandemic, but reopened on August 13, 2020.

The Cleveland restaurant was located in the Westin Cleveland Downtown Hotel.

== See also ==
- List of restaurants in Denver
