= Sousòl =

Cocktail bar in Portland, Oregon, U.S.

- Interactive map of Sousòl

Restaurant information
- Location: 227 Southeast 6th Avenue, Portland, Multnomah, Oregon, 97214, United States
- Coordinates: 45.5212°N 122.6598°W
- Website: sousolbar.com

Sousòl is a pan-Caribbean cocktail bar in Portland, Oregon. Established in 2022, it operates below Kann.

== Description ==
Sousòl operates below the Haitian restaurant Kann, in Southeast Portland's Buckman neighborhood.

== Reception ==
Sousòl was named one of the best bars in the U.S. by Esquire in 2023. Fodor's has said the "outstanding" bar offers "friendly" service. Sararosa Davies included Sousòl in Eater Portland's 2025 overview of the city's best gluten-free restaurants and bakeries.
