= The Nines (hotel) =

Hotel in Portland, Oregon, U.S.

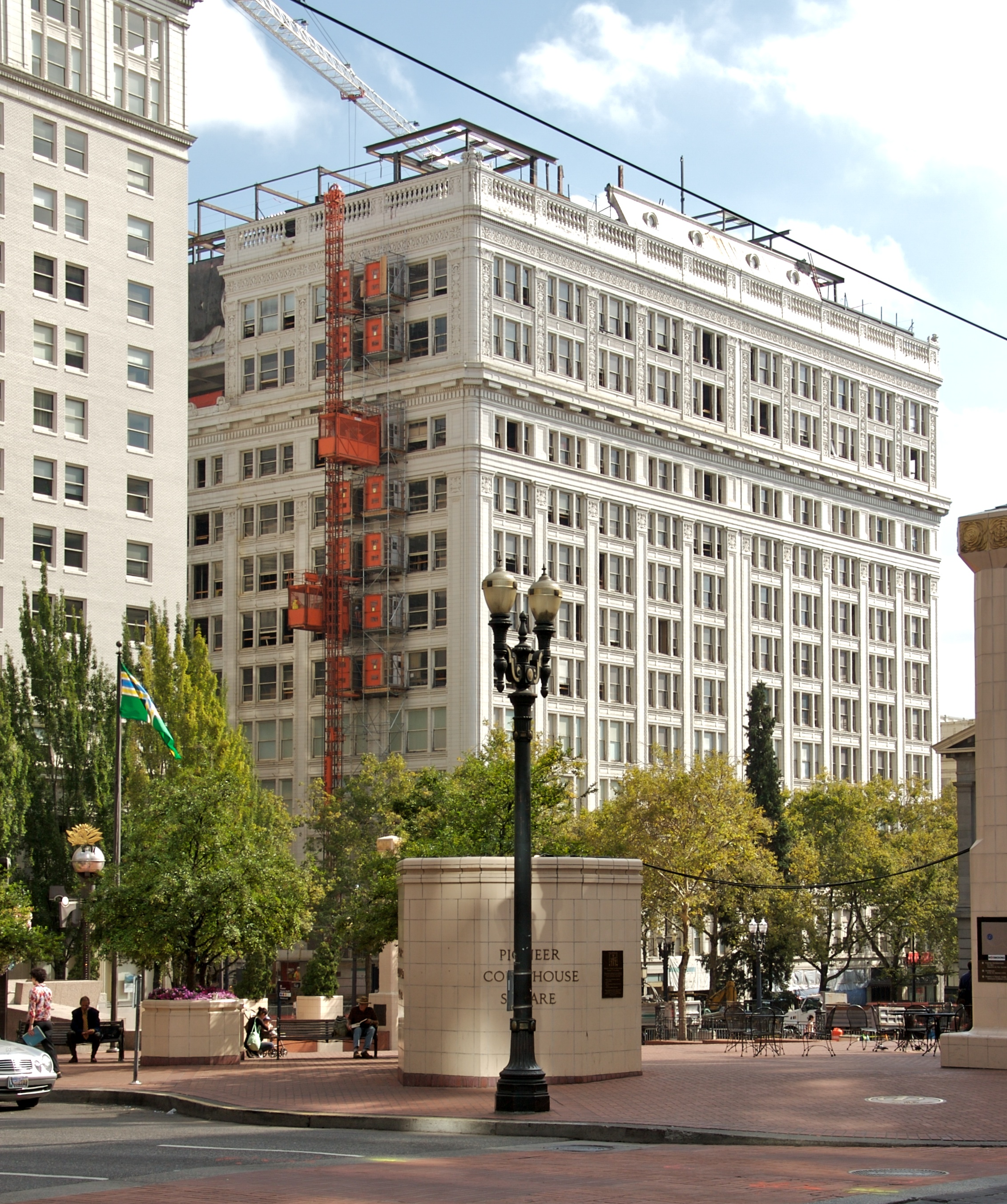
- Meier & Frank building during remodel in 2007 that added The Nines to the complex – Pioneer Courthouse Square in foreground
- Interactive map of the The Nines area

General information
- Location: 525 SW Morrison Street, Portland, Oregon, United States
- Coordinates: 45.51920°N 122.6781°W
- Opened: 2008; 18 years ago
- Owner: Pebblebrook Hotel Trust

Technical details
- Floor count: 9

Website
- www.thenines.com

The Nines is a luxury hotel in Portland, Oregon. It is a franchise of The Luxury Collection by Marriott International and is owned by Pebblebrook Hotel Trust. The hotel and dining amenities are managed by Sage Hospitality Resources.

Opened in 2008, the hotel occupies the top nine floors of the Meier & Frank Building; this paired with the building's opening date of 1909 gives the hotel its name. The 331-room hotel includes 32 suites, making it the sixth largest hotel in Portland based on the number of rooms after the Hyatt Regency, with 600 rooms and opened in 2019.

The hotel has two restaurants: Urban Farmer, a gourmet steakhouse is located on the 8th floor, which also serves as the lobby. Departure Restaurant and Lounge provides Pan-Asian cuisine and sits atop the building.

Pebblebrook acquired the hotel in July 2014 for $127 million, or $384,000 per key.
