= Melissa King =

American chef (born 1983)

- Born: October 11, 1983 (age 42); Whittier, California, U.S.
- Education: The Culinary Institute of America; University of California, Irvine
- Television: Top Chef: Boston; Top Chef: All-Stars L.A.

Melissa King (born October 11, 1983) is an American chef and television personality. King is known for her appearances on the reality competition series Top Chef. She first appeared on the twelfth season of Top Chef: Boston, placing fourth; she then returned for the seventeenth season, Top Chef: All-Stars L.A., which she won. She specializes in modern Californian cuisine with Asian flavors.

== Early life and education ==
King grew up in Los Angeles, California and was the younger of two sisters. Her parents were Chinese immigrants, who moved from Hong Kong to Los Angeles in the late 1960s. Her mother was an aerospace engineer and her father an electrical engineer. She attended the University of California, Santa Barbara, before transferring to the University of California, Irvine, where she graduated with a B.A. in cognitive science. She then attended The Culinary Institute of America in Hyde Park, New York, earning an A.A. in culinary arts.

== Career ==
King took her first kitchen job when she was 17 years old as a pastry assistant at the Getty Museum. She subsequently trained under several Michelin-star and James Beard-recognized chefs including Dominique Crenn and Ron Siegel over the next 10 years. She has worked at several Michelin starred Bay Area restaurants such as Campton Place, Luce, and The Dining Room (Ritz-Carlton San Francisco). She was a chef ambassador for Whole Foods Market. She was selected as one of the "Best Female Chefs in San Francisco."

King earned national recognition after placing fourth as a finalist on Season 12 of Bravo's television series, Top Chef. King was invited back for Season 17 of Top Chef, the show's second all-stars season, where she was announced the winner and received the US$250,000 grand prize. She was subsequently voted as the "fan favorite" of Season 17, earning her another US$10,000, which she donated to several non-profit organizations, including the Black Visions Collective, Asian Americans for Equality, Asian Youth Center, and The Trevor Project. She has the most single-season individual challenge wins of any competitor in the history of Top Chef. She says her experience on Top Chef changed her perspective on her career. Specifically, she stated, "My entire life I grew up thinking I wanted to own a restaurant and be a chef and get a Michelin star. It wasn't until my experience with Top Chef that the world became so much more vast and open. I can do anything I want." King owns a company focused on culinary partnerships and experiences and is the creator of King Sauce, a small batch line of signature sauces.

=== Modeling ===
King made her modeling debut in a global Levi Strauss Pride Campaign in 2018.

King subsequently appeared in the Gap Inc SP21 Individual Anthems campaign in 2021, as well as on the company's Instagram Reel interviews coinciding with the campaign.

=== Television appearances ===
King was a finalist of Bravo's Top Chef (season 12) in 2014 and was the winner of Top Chef All Stars in 2020. King appeared in Top Chef (season 18) and Top Chef (season 19) as a guest judge.

In 2021, King appeared in Sesame Street: See Us Coming Together Special, in celebration of the AAPI community.

In 2022, King appeared as a guest judge in Food Network’s The Julia Child Challenge.

=== Appearances ===
She has made appearances at prominent culinary and music festivals; examples in the U.S. include Coachella, Outsidelands, South Beach Wine & Food Festival, Pebble Beach Food & Wine, Kohler Food & Wine Experience, and KitchenAid SrPGA.

== Personal life and activism ==
King is openly queer and an advocate for LGBTQ equality as well as women's empowerment, environmental sustainability, and food education for youths.

She was awarded Grand Marshall for San Francisco Pride 2016.

King spoke out against anti-Asian racism and harassment during the COVID-19 pandemic in alliance with Ad Council in a PSA campaign directed by Alan Yang.

King hosts virtual cooking experiences with proceeds supporting charities such as The Okra Project, No Kid Hungry, The Trevor Project, Asian Pacific Islanders for Equality, National Black Justice Coalition.

In 2020, King was recognized on Out100 list for her groundbreaking, ripple-inducing, and culture-shifting impact around the world in the LGBTQ+ community.
