= Mise en place =

French culinary term referring to preparation

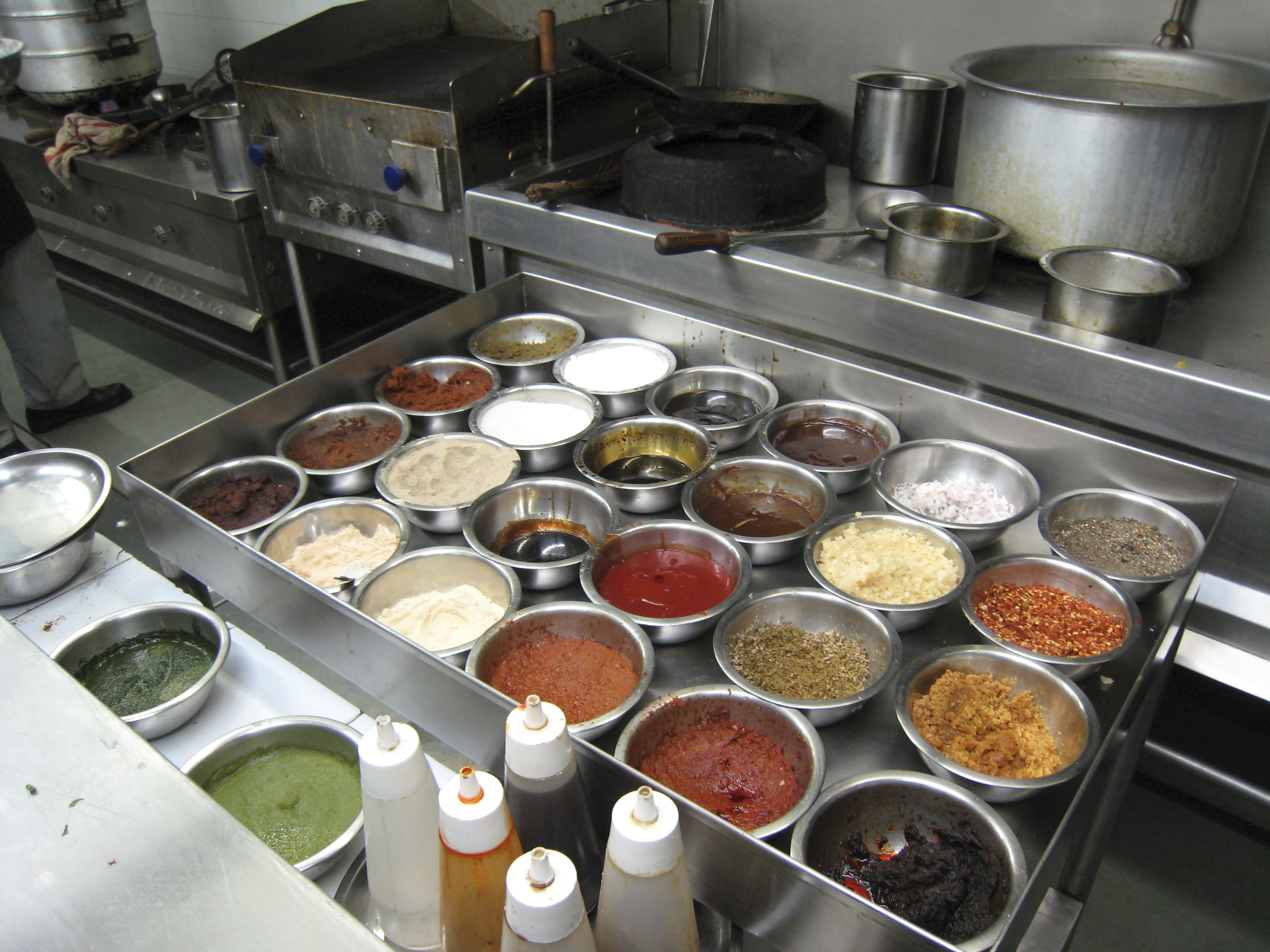
Mise en place in a professional kitchen

Mise en place (French pronunciation: [mi zɑ̃ ˈplas]) is a French culinary phrase which means "putting into place". It refers to the setup required before cooking, and is often used in professional kitchens to refer to organizing and arranging the ingredients (e.g., cuts of meat, relishes, sauces, par-cooked items, spices, freshly chopped vegetables, and other components) that a cook will require for the menu items that are expected to be prepared during a shift.

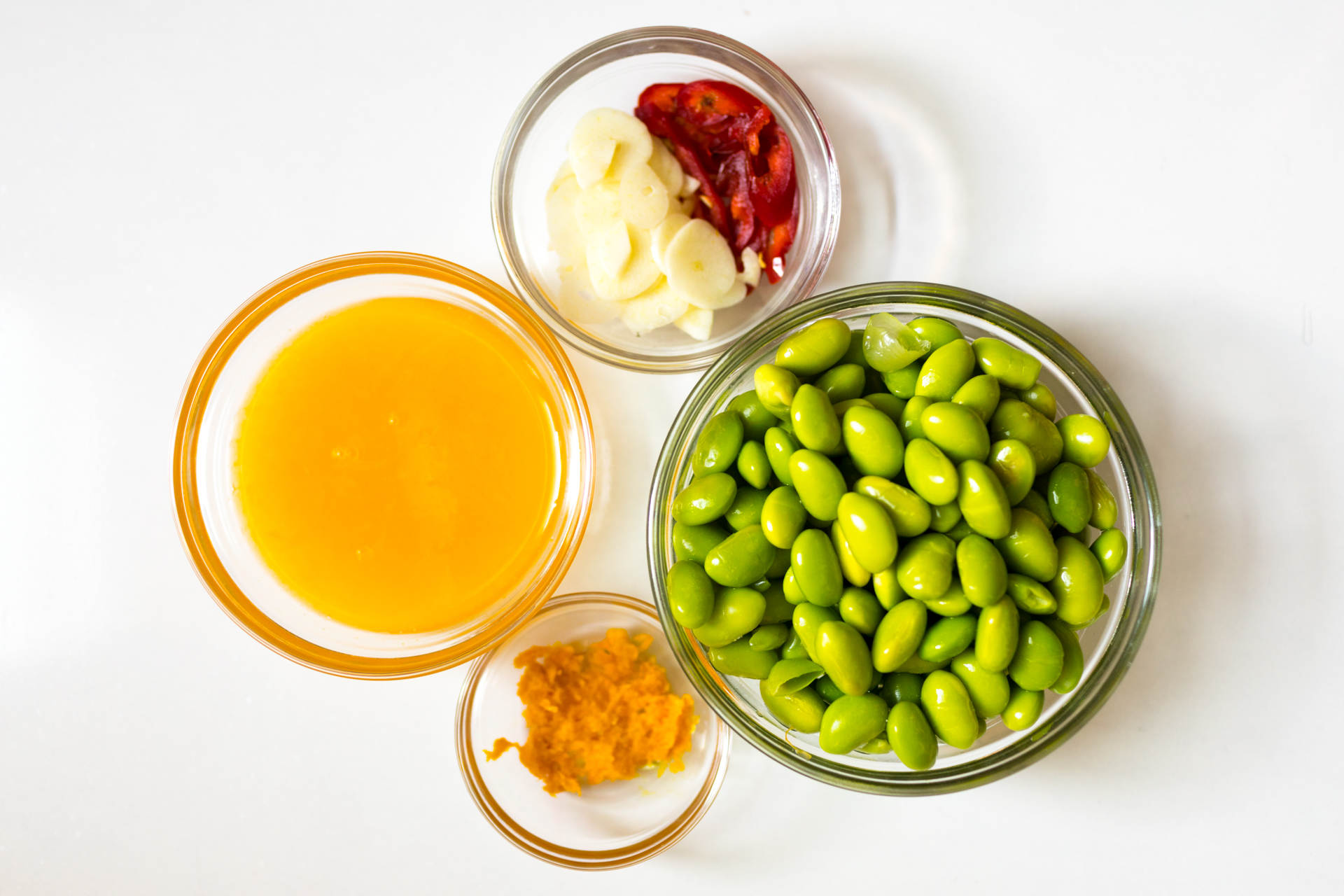
Mise en place in small bowls for stir fry

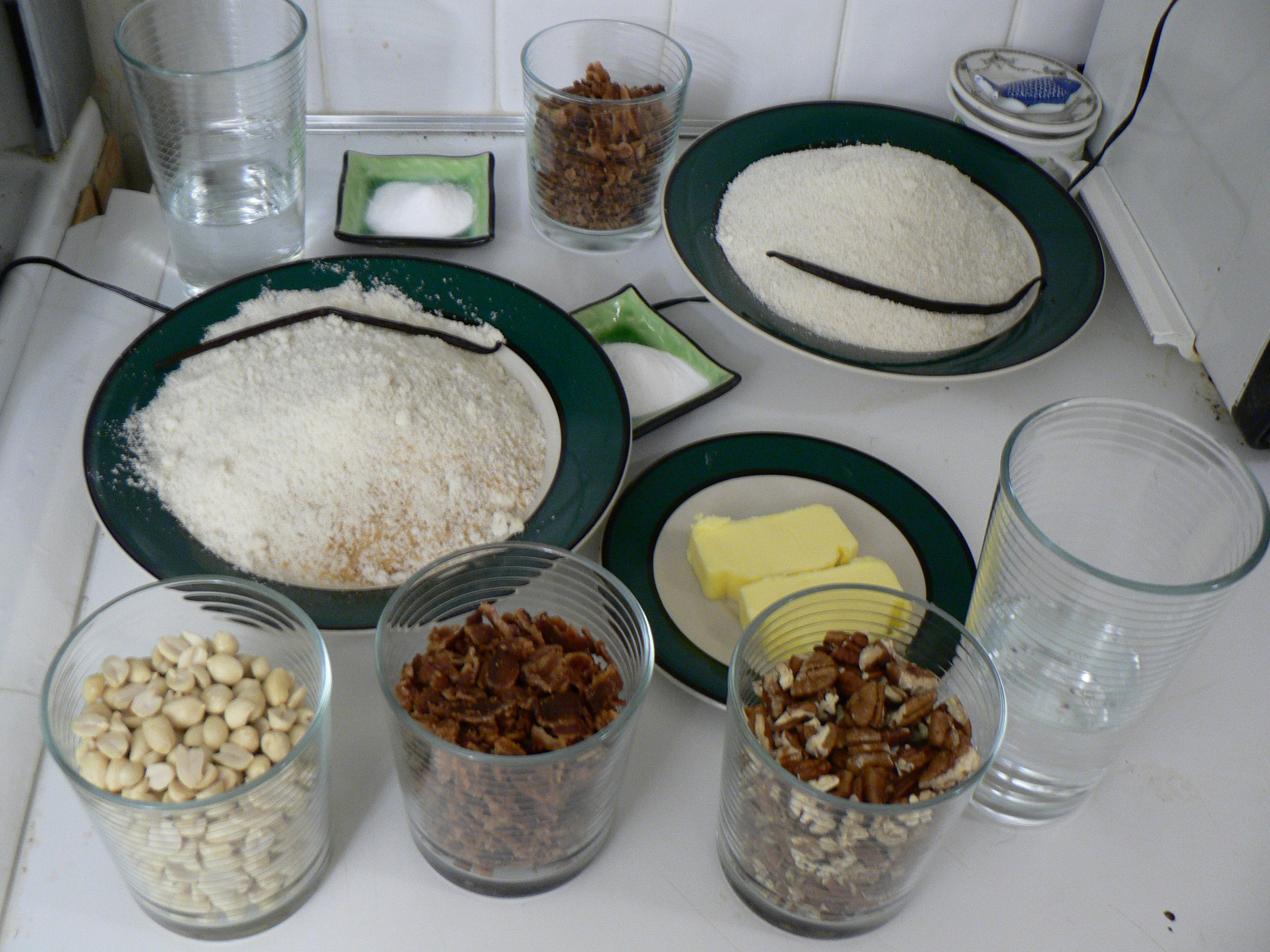
Ingredients arranged in a home kitchen for a peanut brittle recipe

The practice can be applied in home kitchens.

In the kitchen, the phrase is used as a noun (i.e., the setup of the array of ingredients), a verb (i.e., the process of preparing) and a state of mind. The term's broader meanings can be applied to classrooms, hospitals, IT departments, and elsewhere.

== Use outside of cooking ==
The term has also been used outside of cooking: psychologists Weisberg, et al., used the phrase to refer to "how one's stance towards a given environment places constraints on what one feels able to do within that environment, and how these assessments and predispositions impact the process of preparing to act." They used the term in a study of how a school became safer after security measures – like metal detectors and bars on the windows – were removed, leading to the unexpected outcome.

== See also ==
- Knolling
- Mirepoix
- Glossary of French expressions in English
