= Penn State School of Hospitality Management =

Hospitality school in Pennsylvania, United States

Pennsylvania State University School of Hospitality Management
- Type: • Public • State-related • Land-grant
- Established: 1937
- Director: Donna Quadri-Felitti
- Location: University Park, Pennsylvania, United States
- Campus: University Park
- Website: www.hhd.psu.edu/shm

The Pennsylvania State University School of Hospitality Management (also known as SHM) is located at the main campus of The Pennsylvania State University in University Park, Pennsylvania, United States, and serves over 300 students. SHM is one of the three oldest continually-operating hospitality management programs in the United States and offers a Bachelor of Science (B.S.), Master of Professional Studies (M.P.S.) and Doctor of Philosophy (Ph.D.) in Hospitality Management. The B.S. Degree offers an optional minor in Entrepreneurship and Innovation.

SHM has an Industry Advisory Board composed of leading hospitality industry executives who provide the school with strategic advice and strengthen SHM's industry links for such things as career placement, education, and research, as well as help faculty remain current about industry trends. The school's alumni association is known as the Penn State Hotel and Restaurant Society and is the oldest academically affiliated alumni association at Penn State.

== History ==
The hospitality management program at Penn State formally began in 1937 as an outgrowth of Institutional Management and was originally known as Hotel Administration.

In 1958, the program became Food Service and Housing Administration (FSHA), dividing the Hotel Administration major into two separate majors – Commercial Food Service and Institutional Resident Management.

In the 1970s, the program became focused on Service Management and Administrative Dietetics.

In 1981, the program name changed again, and the Department of Hotel, Restaurant and Institutional Management (HRIM) was formed. The department was upgraded in 1987, and the School of Hotel, Restaurant and Institutional Management was created. In 2005, the program was renamed the School of Hospitality Management.

== Mateer Building and Cafe Laura ==
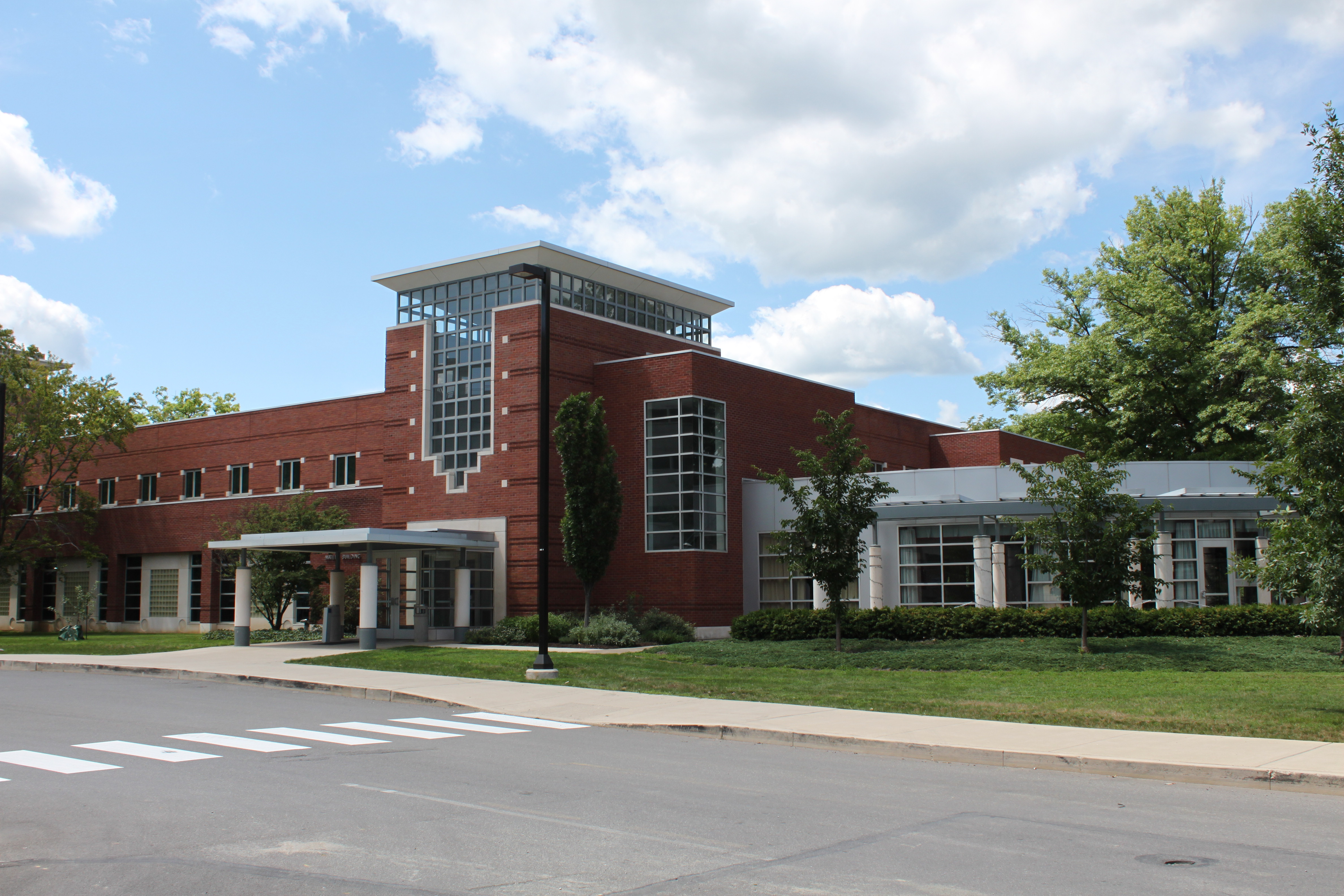
Mateer Building- Penn State School of Hospitality Management

The School of Hospitality Management is located in the Mateer Building on the northwest corner of Penn State's University Park campus near the intersection of Atherton Street and Park Avenue. Mateer was completed in 1993 and is named after A. Laura Mateer and her husband M.C. "Matty" Mateer in whose memory she had donated $1.5 million to the School. Mateer is the host to Cafe Laura, the Career Center, conference rooms, faculty offices, a computer laboratory and classrooms.

Cafe Laura, named for Laura Mateer, is the student-run restaurant located in the Mateer Building. Under the supervision of instructors, students receive hands-on restaurant experience in a laid back lunch setting and a formal theme dinner setting. Café Laura underwent a significant make-over in 2013, with an all new dining area including tables, chairs, carpeting, painting, artwork, signage, lighting fixtures, equipment and window treatments, new menus and the addition of grab-and-go equipment and service. During 2014, an additional $1.2 million renovation occurred that included a completely new servery, espresso bar, executive dining room, rest rooms, and additional lighting fixtures, carpeting, painting, artwork, signage and menus.

== National rankings ==
The Hospitality Management program at Penn State has frequently been recognized as one of the leading hospitality programs in the world, ranked number four in the world and number one in the United States for the period of 2011 to 2015.

In contributions to academic research in six top-tier academic research journals from 2000-2009, Dr. Anna Mattila was ranked as the most prolific hospitality author of the new millennium, Dr. John O'Neill was ranked in the top ten, and Dr. Seoki Lee was ranked in the top 30. In a review of the second decade of the new millennium, Drs. Mattila and Lee both ranked in the top five, and Dr. O'Neill ranked in the top 30 of hospitality research.

Penn State was ranked as number four in a JHTR article regarding the top 100 hospitality programs, and ranked third in publication contributions to the Cornell Hospitality Quarterly. A research article analyzed the number of contributions in leading hospitality journals, and showed Penn State had the sixth highest number of contributions. A Hospitality Review article ranked Penn State as the number two graduate hospitality program. A Journal of Hospitality & Tourism Education article ranked Penn State as the number five undergraduate hospitality program, while a Journal of Hospitality & Tourism Education article ranked Penn State as the number four undergraduate hospitality program.

== Conti Professorship ==
The Conti Professorship was established in 1987 by alumni and friends of the Penn State School of Hospitality Management. The professorship program honors Walter J. Conti, a former multi-unit restaurant operator and Chair of the National Restaurant Association for his contributions to the School, Penn State, and the hospitality profession. Conti Professors are recognized leaders within the hospitality industry who visit the school to interact with students and faculty, present guest lectures in hospitality management, and speak at graduate and undergraduate colloquia. The distinguished list of over 70 Conti Professors includes some of the most recognized names in the hospitality industry, including entrepreneurs, CEOs and leading industry educators. Recent notable Conti Professors have been:

- Robin Hamm 2022 - Vice President, Social Impact, MOD Pizza
- Peggy Berg 2022 - Founder, Castell, an American Hotel and Lodging Association Foundation Project
- Ankie Hoefnagels 2022 - Professor, Global Minds Zuyd University
- Gerry Fernandez 2020-2021 - President & Founder, The Multicultural Foodservice & Hospitality Alliance
- Javid Baig 2019 - Chief Client Officer & Senior VP, Aramark
- John Miles 2018 - President & CEO, Steelite International
- Barry Bloom 2018 - President & COO, Xenia Hotels & Resorts
- Susan Morelli 2016 - Former President & CEO, Au Bon Pain
- Raymond Blanchette 2016 - President & CEO, Au Bon Pain
- Dawn Sweeney 2015 – President and CEO, National Restaurant Association
- Katherine Lugar 2015 - President and CEO, American Hotel and Lodging Association
- Daniel Lesser 2015 - President and CEO, LWHA Hospitality Advisors
- Lee Pillsbury 2014 - Chairman, Thayer Lodging Group
- Nancy Johnson 2014 - Executive VP, Industry Relations, Carlson Rezidor Hotel Group
- Danny Meyer 2013 – CEO and Founder, Union Square Hospitality
- Frits van Paasschen 2013 – President and CEO, Starwood
- John Metz 2012 - Executive Chairman, Metz Culinary Management
- Plato Ghinos 2011 - President, Shaner Hotel Group
- Bill Fortier 2011 - Senior Vice President, Development, Hilton Worldwide
- Steve Rushmore 2010 - Chairman and Founder, HVS Global Hospitality Services
- Mark Lomanno 2010 - President, STR, Inc
- Franco Harris 2009 – President and Owner, Super Bakery, Inc.
