= Erika Polmar =

Entrepreneur and activist from Oregon, US

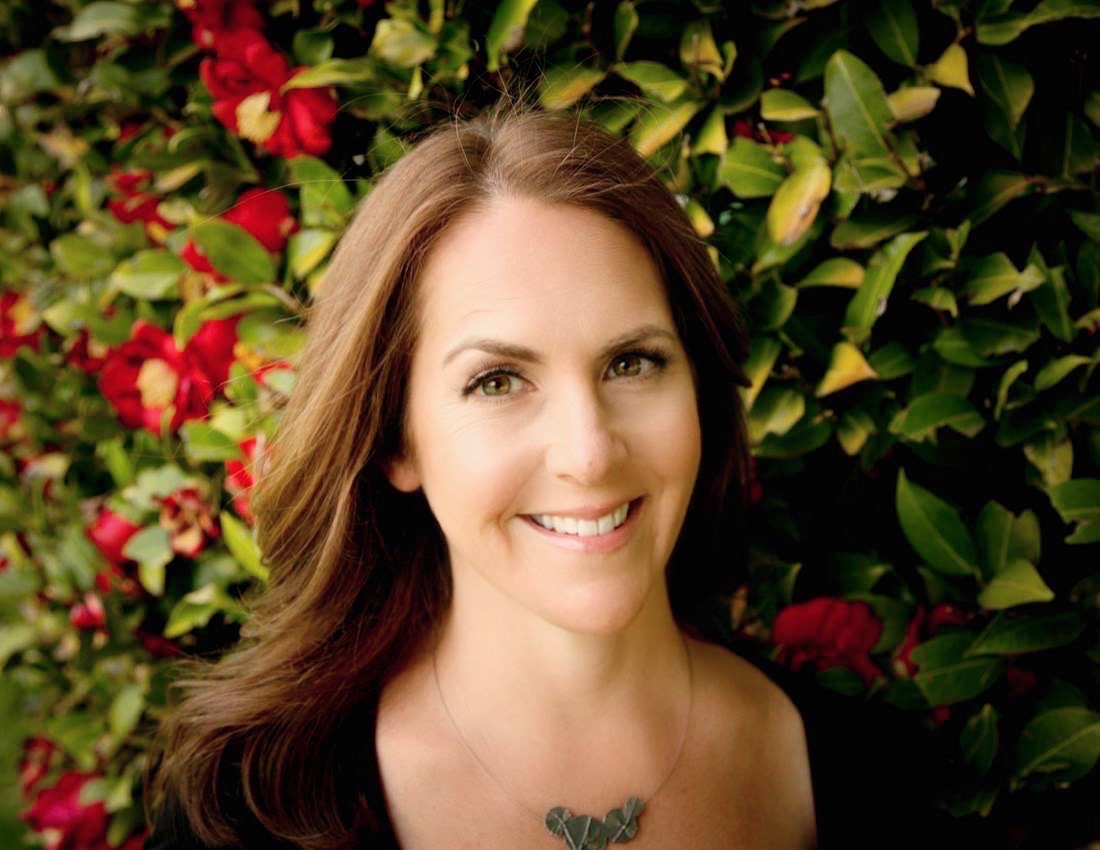
Erika Polmar

Erika Polmar is an American agritourism entrepreneur and food industry activist based in Oregon. She is the co-founder of the Independent Restaurant Coalition (IRC), a coalition formed amid the COVID-19 pandemic that pushes for government relief for independent restaurateurs amid the pandemic.

She is the founder of Plate & Pitchfork, a summer farm-dinner series in Oregon.

== Early life and education ==
Polmar is a graduate of St. Louis University. Polmar moved to Oregon after graduating from college.

== Career ==
Polmar began her career selling advertising for the Willamette Week. She opened the Portland office of citysearch.com and continued to work in technology product development until she was one of the millions of individuals who lost their jobs in the aftermath of the September 11th attack.

Days after the layoff, she was volunteering at a winery sorting grapes when she learned that a group of Portland chefs were planning a fundraiser for children orphaned by the 9/11 terrorist attacks and needed an organizer. She produced the event, Flux, which was a success, and through the experience made contacts in the local food and wine industry.

=== Plate & Pitchfork ===
Polmar founded Plate & Pitchfork farm dinners with Emily Berreth in 2003. Oregon Home characterized Plate & Pitchfork as a "summer farm-dinner series that features farmers, local chefs, winemakers and stellar five-course alfresco meals". In 2010, Plate & Pitchfork held its first event outside of Portland metropolitan area, in Wallowa, Oregon.

In 2010, Berreth stepped away from the project and Polmar grew the business to offer added hands-on cooking class events, rafting trips with chef-prepared local foods and agritourism consulting.

=== Independent Restaurant Coalition ===
During the 2020 coronavirus pandemic, Polmar led local and national efforts to lobby local, state, and federal governments for relief for small food-related businesses in Oregon and the US. She was a founding member and leadership team member of the Independent Restaurant Coalition (IRC), where her work helped lead to the creation of the $28.6B Restaurant Revitalization Fund.

In June 2020, Erika became the first COO of the IRC. She currently serves as the organization's Executive Director. Polmar is an Advisor to the Independent Restaurant Alliance of Oregon, a member of the Oregon Agritourism Network leadership team and a Member of the Board of Slow Food Wallowas.

During the surge of the Omicron variant in early 2022, Polmar reiterated her support for pushing more federal funding into the Restaurant Revitalization Fund.

In 2023, Polmar founded the Plate & Pitchfork Producer Fund, a 501c3 organization that provides financial support to family-owned farmers, ranchers and food producers in Oregon.

== Recognition ==
In 2021, Polmar was highlighted in Nation's Restaurant News as part of the NRN Power List owing to work at the IRC.
