= Paasschens =

Paasschens is a surname. Notable people with the surname include:

- Frits van Paasschen (born 1961), Dutch-American business executive
- Mathijs Paasschens (born 1996), Dutch cyclist
