= United States restaurant industry =

The United States restaurant industry was projected at $899 billion in sales for 2020 by the National Restaurant Association, the main trade association for the industry in the United States. An estimated 99% of companies in the industry are family-owned small businesses with fewer than 50 employees. The industry as a whole as of February 2020 employed more than 15 million people, representing 10% of the workforce directly. It is the nation's second largest private employer and the third largest employer overall. It indirectly employed close to another 10% when dependent businesses such as food producers, trucking, and delivery services were factored in, according to Ohio restaurateur Britney Ruby Miller. In Delaware and Massachusetts, one in ten workers is employed in the restaurant industry. In North Carolina, 11% of workers are employed by the industry. In Texas, 12% of workers were employed by the industry as of 2016.

The effect of the 2020 coronavirus epidemic was in March 2020 projected to be $225 billion in losses. The industry is suffering from high operational costs and people eating out less frequently over the years.

== See also ==
- Independent Restaurant Coalition
