= Victor Rosellini =

Victor Rosellini (1915–2003) was a Seattle restaurateur, and president of the National Restaurant Association and the Restaurant Association of the State of Washington.

Victor Rosellini was born in Tacoma in 1915, the son of Italian immigrant parents.

In 1936, Rosellini went to San Francisco to run "front of house" at his brother-in-law Agostino Giuntoli's Bimbo's 365 Club, a large and glamorous nightclub.

In 1950, he opened Rosellini's 610, followed in 1956 by Rosellini's Four-10, both in Seattle.

Rosellini was president of the National Restaurant Association and the Restaurant Association of the State of Washington.

His first cousin, Albert Rosellini, was Governor of Washington from 1957 until 1965.
