= Giuntoli =

Giuntoli is an Italian surname. Notable people with the surname include:

- Agostino Giuntoli (1903–1992), Italian-born American nightclub owner
- Cristiano Giuntoli (born 1972), Italian football director and former player
- David Giuntoli (born 1980), American actor
- Neil Giuntoli (born 1959), American actor
