= Angelo Sangiacomo =

American real estate developer

Angelo Sangiacomo (1924 – December 8, 2015) was an American real estate developer and one of the largest landlords in San Francisco.

He was born and grew up in modest circumstances in San Francisco's Richmond District, the son of Alessandro and Caterina Sangiacomo, who were new immigrants to the United States. He was educated at Frank McCoppin Elementary School and George Washington High School, followed by the University of San Francisco. He was in the U.S. Navy during World War II.

Trinity Properties, his family-owned company, owned and operated dozens of buildings and thousands of apartments across San Francisco.

In 1956, Sangiacomo married Yvonne Giuntoli, the daughter of Agostino Giuntoli, owner of Bimbo's 365 Club in San Francisco, and they had seven children.
