= Chartered Institute of Environmental Health =

United Kingdom professional membership body

- Abbreviation: CIEH
- Formation: 1883
- Legal status: Not-for-profit Royal Chartered professional body
- Purpose: Enhancing and promoting environmental health
- Headquarters: Chadwick Court
- Location: 15 Hatfields, Southwark, London, SE1 8DJ
- Region served: UK
- Members: c. 7,500
- President: Mark Elliott
- Main organ: Board of Trustees
- Affiliations: International Federation of Environmental Health, Environmental Health Registration Board
- Website: cieh.org

The Chartered Institute of Environmental Health (CIEH) is a professional membership body concerned with environmental health and promoting standards in the training and education of environmental health professionals.

== History ==
The history of the Chartered Institute of Environmental Health can be traced back to 1883 when the original organisation was founded and called the Association of Public Sanitary Inspectors.

In 1984, the then Institute of Environmental Health Officers was granted a Royal Charter, a deed giving it special powers, rights and privileges. It became subject to scrutiny by the Privy Council and spent the next ten years taking additional steps to ensure the professional standards of its membership. This resulted in permission being given in 1994 for the organisation to reflect its chartered status through a change in its name to Chartered Institute of Environmental Health.

The Royal Charter states that the objects of CIEH are: "to promote for the public benefit the theory and science of environmental health in all its aspects and to disseminate knowledge about environmental health."

Presidents of CIEH and its predecessor organisations have included Sir Edwin Chadwick, Sir Benjamin Ward Richardson, Sir John Hutton, Sir James Crichton-Browne, and Stephen Battersby MBE.

== Activities ==
CIEH is based in the UK with approximately 7,000 members worldwide; the majority being based in England, Wales and Northern Ireland.

CIEH’s head office is Chadwick Court (named after Edwin Chadwick), in Southwark, London.

It also provides a range of professional qualifications and work-based learning including e-learning and corporate training. CIEH’s qualification portfolio includes food safety, health and safety, first aid, fire safety and environmental protection.

CIEH also works with organisations in the private, public and charity sectors, helping them comply with legal requirements and best practice, as well as offering training for their employees.

== Membership ==
CIEH offers five grades of membership: Student, Affiliate, Associate, Member and Fellow.

Members have access to professional development resources, sector news and publications, mentoring, networking opportunities, support for continuing professional development and professional registration, opportunities to contribute to policy and advocacy work, and discounts on selected conferences, events and training.

== Professional Registration ==
Since 2003 CIEH has awarded the status of Chartered Environmental Health Practitioner. Chartered status can be obtained only by Members with a CIEH accredited degree who have demonstrated their competence through practice.

Chartered Environmental Health Practitioners may use the post-nominal letters CEnvH and can gain entry to the Occupational Safety and Health Consultants Register (OSHCR).

In 2021 CIEH began to directly award the status of Registered Environmental Health Practitioner and in 2022 CIEH obtained permission from Privy Council for the use of the post-nominal REnvH.

CIEH maintains online registers for Chartered Environmental Health Practitioners, Registered Environmental Health Practitioners, Food Safety Practitioners and Housing Health Practitioners.

== See also ==
- Environmental Health Registration Board
- International Federation of Environmental Health
- National Registry of Food Safety Professionals
