= Camilla Marcus =

American chef and restaurateur

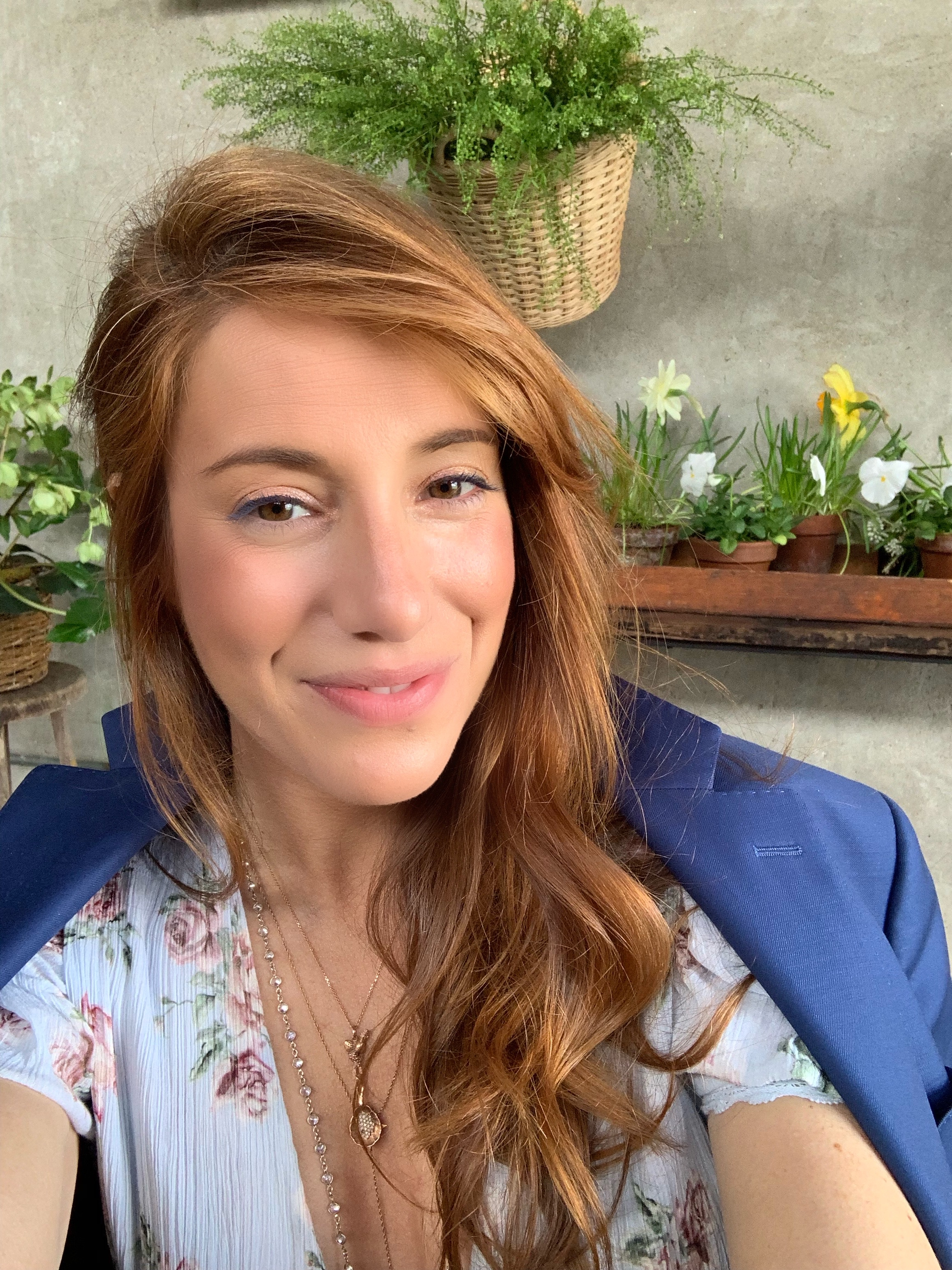
Marcus in 2020

Camilla Marcus is a New York chef and restaurateur. She owned west~bourne in New York's SoHo neighborhood. In 2020 during the coronavirus pandemic closures, Marcus joined the leadership team of the lobbying group Independent Restaurant Coalition to try to save the independent restaurant industry.

== Early life ==
Marcus was born and raised in Los Angeles. She has a business degree from Wharton, an MBA/JD from New York University, and studied culinary arts at the International Culinary Center.

== Career ==
As an undergrad Marcus worked at Dell'anima and as a graduate student she worked for Tom Colicchio while he was opening Riverpark. Later she served as Director of Business Development for Union Square Hospitality Group.

Marcus founded west~bourne, a cafe in SoHo, in January 2018. She was named one of the PureWow 100 in 2018.

In 2020 during the coronavirus pandemic closures, Marcus joined the lobbying group Independent Restaurant Coalition as a member of the leadership team to try to save the independent restaurant industry. She also cofounded the fundraising organization ROAR to raise relief funds for laid-off restaurant workers.

== Business model ==
The restaurant used communal seating.

The restaurant employed no porters or dishwashers, and all employees entered at the same level and were cross trained to do all jobs. It donated 1% of revenues to The Door, which provides hospitality industry training for youth. In October 2019 she announced she would partner with Vivvi to offer her employees subsidized childcare from 7am to 2 am, weekdays and weekends.
