= Dawn Sweeney =

American business executive

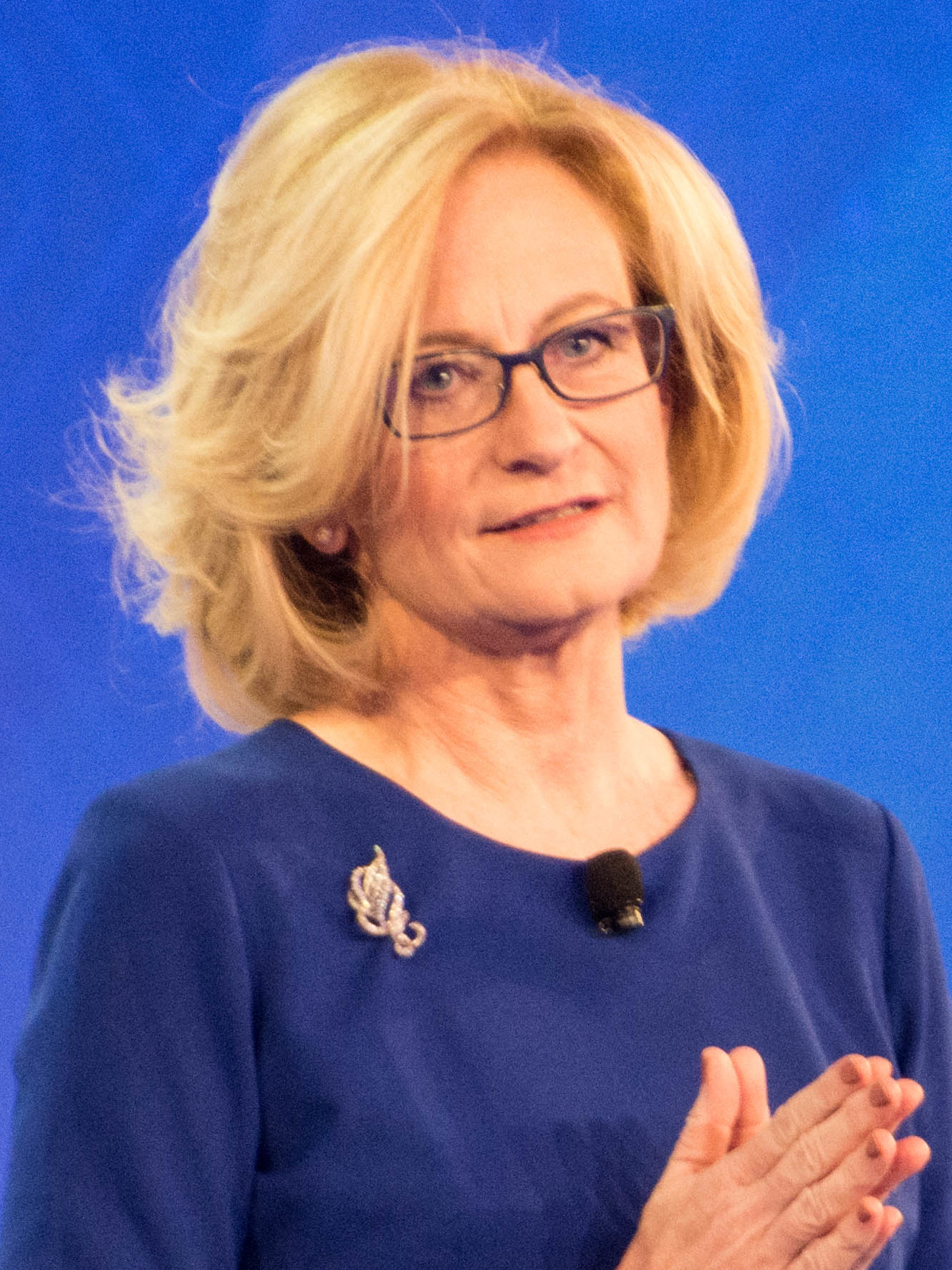

President of the National Restaurant Association
- In office 2007–2019
- Preceded by: Steven C. Anderson
- Succeeded by: Marvin Irby

Personal details
- Born: Westbrook, Maine
- Education: Colby College (BA); George Washington University (MBA)

Dawn Sweeney is an American business executive who served as president and chief executive officer of the National Restaurant Association from October 2007 to December 2019. She was the first woman to hold this role in the association's history.

== Background ==
Sweeney holds a Master of Business Administration (MBA) from George Washington University and a Bachelor of Arts in Government from Colby College in Waterville, Maine.

== Career ==
Sweeney served as Group Executive Officer for Membership at AARP, where she contributed to Hispanic membership development initiatives and managed editorial oversight of AARP: The Magazine. Prior to her tenure at AARP, she held executive roles at the National Rural Electric Cooperative Association and the International Dairy Foods Association.

She later became president and CEO of AARP Services, a subsidiary of AARP, where she played a role in the establishment of AARP Financial, a platform providing financial services and products.

From 2007 to 2019, Sweeney served as president and chief executive officer of the National Restaurant Association. During her leadership, she supported initiatives related to member engagement, workforce training, and industry-wide business services. She concurrently held the position of CEO at the National Restaurant Association’s Educational Foundation.

As of 2024, Sweeney is affiliated with the Portion Balance Coalition as an executive in residence at Business for Impact, a program housed at Georgetown University.

== Recognition and service ==
In Spring 2015, the Pennsylvania State University School of Hospitality Management appointed Sweeney as a visiting professor, where she conducted a master class on leadership and industry trends.

In 2009, CEO Update magazine included her in its list of top association CEOs in the United States.

She was recognized by Irish America in 2007 as one of its annual 100 honorees, and was inducted into the Honor Society of the American Culinary Federation's American Academy of Chefs.

Sweeney serves on the board of Save the Children, a global organization focused on child welfare and humanitarian assistance.

She is also affiliated with the United States Chamber of Commerce's Committee of 100, the International Women's Forum, and The Committee of 200, an international network of women business leaders.
