= Agostino Giuntoli =

American nightclub owner (1903–1992)

Agostino "Bimbo" Giuntoli
- Born: September 22, 1903; Chiesina Uzzanese, Pistoia, Tuscany, Italy
- Died: July 25, 1992 (aged 88); San Francisco, California, US
- Citizenship: American
- Occupation: Nightclub owner
- Known for: Bimbo's 365 Club

Agostino "Bimbo" Giuntoli (September 22, 1903 – July 25, 1992) was an Italian-born American nightclub owner and entrepreneur.

== Early life ==
Giuntoli was born and raised in Chiesina Uzzanese, Pistoia, Tuscany, Italy. In 1922, aged 19, he emigrated to San Francisco, arriving with just $2. He worked as a janitor at the Palace Hotel and then as a cook nearby, where Monk Young, his boss, was unable to pronounce his name, and called him bimbo instead (Italian for "boy"), and the nickname stuck.

== Bimbo's 365 Club ==
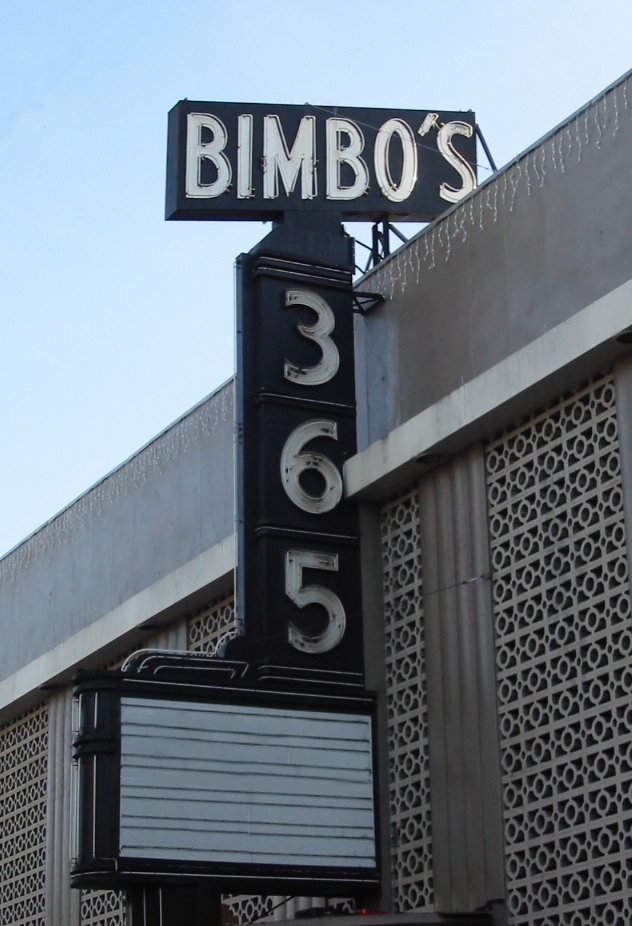
Bimbo's 365 Club

In 1931, the 365 Club, 365 Market Street, was opened as a speakeasy and after-hours gambling club, owned by Young and managed by Giuntoli. It soon became the most popular illicit drinking establishment in town. Musical artists and dancers showcased their work, including a young Rita Hayworth dancing in the chorus line. An optical illusion achieved by mirrors made the large fish tank above the bar appear to have a nude woman swimming in it. Bar patrons marveled at Dolfina, "the Girl in the Fishbowl".

In 1936, he employed Victor Rosellini, his wife's younger brother, in front of house. Rosellini went on to run several restaurants in Seattle, and later became president of the National Restaurant Association.

In 1943, Giuntoli became a naturalized US citizen. In 1950 or 1951, Giuntoli, by that time sole owner of the 365 Club, purchased 1025 Columbus Avenue and moved his club there.

As of 2014, the club is still there, owned and run by his grandson, Michael Cerchiai, who celebrated his eight birthday there with a Batman-themed cake, while Smokey Robinson played live.

== Personal life ==
In 1928, Giuntoli married Emilia Rosellini (December 26, 1908, Tacoma, WA – November 2, 1989, San Francisco), and they had two daughters:

- Diana Isola Cerchiai (born March 18, 1929, San Jose). She has 5 children.
- Yvonne Fine Sangiacomo (born February 11, 1932, San Francisco). Her husband, Angelo Sangiacomo (1924-2015), was a real estate developer, and together they owned about 50 apartment buildings in San Francisco. Their seven children all attended École Notre-Dame-des-Victoires, San Francisco.

Giuntoli died in San Francisco on July 25, 1992. He was survived by his two daughters, 12 grandchildren and 10 great-grandchildren.
