= Impact of the COVID-19 pandemic on the restaurant industry in the United States =

Impact of COVID-19

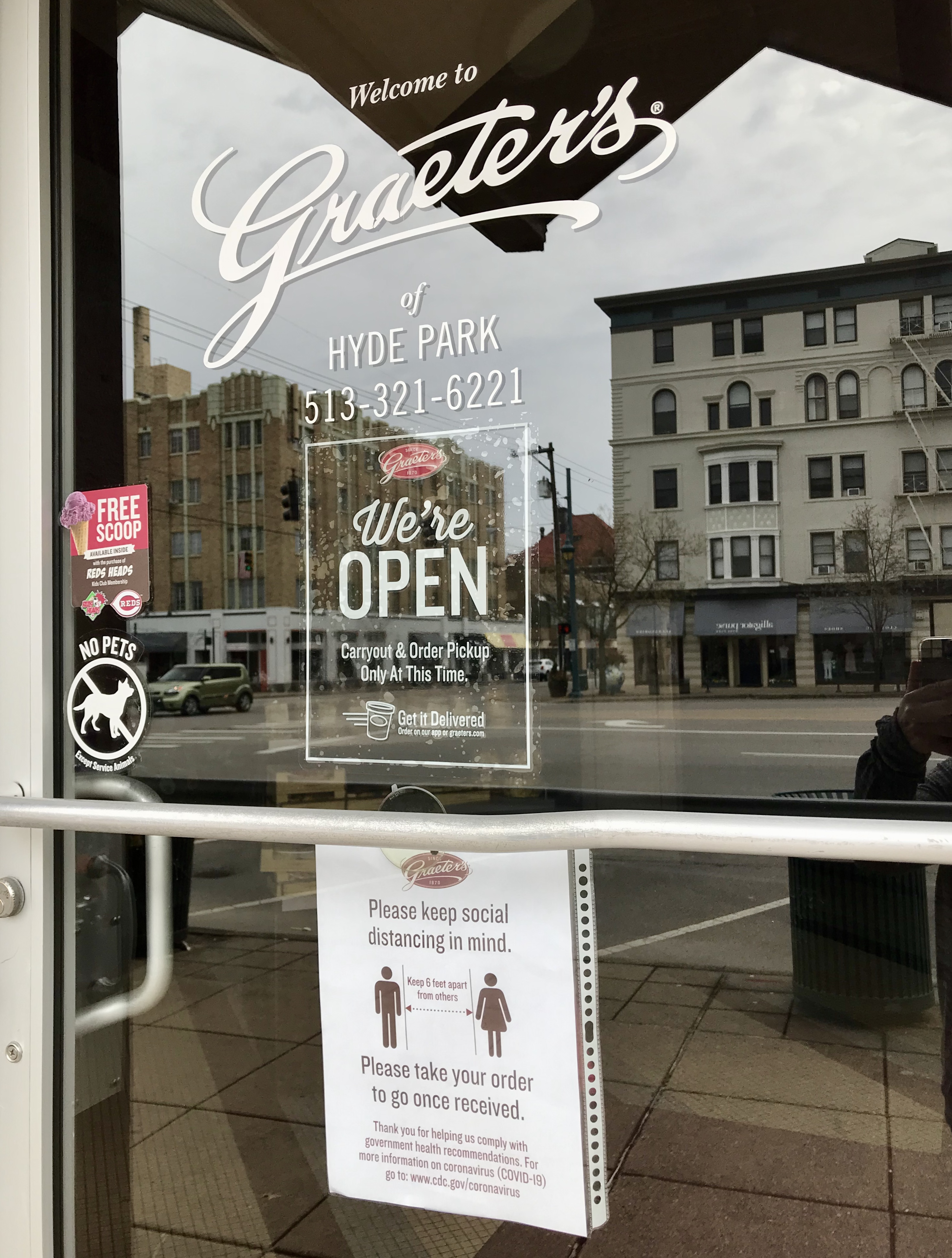
Signs on door of a Graeter's ice cream parlor in the Hyde Park neighborhood of Cincinnati during government-mandated closings

The COVID-19 pandemic impacted the United States restaurant industry via government closures, resulting in layoffs of workers and loss of income for restaurants and owners and threatening the survival of independent restaurants as a category. After the closings ended, restaurants continued to face staffing challenges.

Within a week after the first closures, industry groups representing independent restaurateurs were asking for immediate relief measures from local, state, and federal governments, saying that as many as 75 percent of independent restaurants could not survive closures of more than a few weeks. By late July, nearly 16,000 restaurants had permanently closed.

Restaurant closures started March 15 when Ohio governor Mike DeWine ordered all bars and restaurants in the state to close their dining rooms and bars; within a week most other states followed suit. By March 23, industry experts were estimating nearly half of the industry's 15 million workers had been laid off. Insurers refused to cover the restaurants' financial losses via business interruption policies.

Across the world, restaurants' daily traffic dropped precipitously as compared to the same period in 2019 as the coronavirus impacted the overall industry. Closures of restaurants caused a ripple effect among dependent industries such as food production, liquor, wine, and beer production, shipping, linen suppliers, fishing and farming and among musicians, florists, and delivery services.

Ongoing staffing challenges after the initial fallout caused further closings which continued into the mid 2020s.

== Industry background ==
The US restaurant industry was projected at $899 billion (~$1.1 trillion in 2025) in sales for 2020 by the National Restaurant Association, the main trade association for the industry in the United States. An estimated 99 percent of companies in the industry are family-owned small businesses with fewer than 50 employees. The industry as a whole as of February 2020 employed more than 15 million people, representing 10 percent of the workforce directly. It is the nation's second-largest private employer and the third-largest employer overall. It indirectly employed close to another 10 percent when dependent businesses such as food producers, trucking, and delivery services were factored in, according to Ohio restaurateur Britney Ruby Miller. Ancillary industries such as food purveyors, linen suppliers, florists, farming, fishing, trucking, beverages depend on the restaurant industry for their own financial health.

In Delaware and Massachusetts, one in ten workers is employed in the restaurant industry. In North Carolina, 11 percent of workers are employed by the industry. In Texas, 12% of workers were employed by the industry as of 2016.

== Initial closures ==
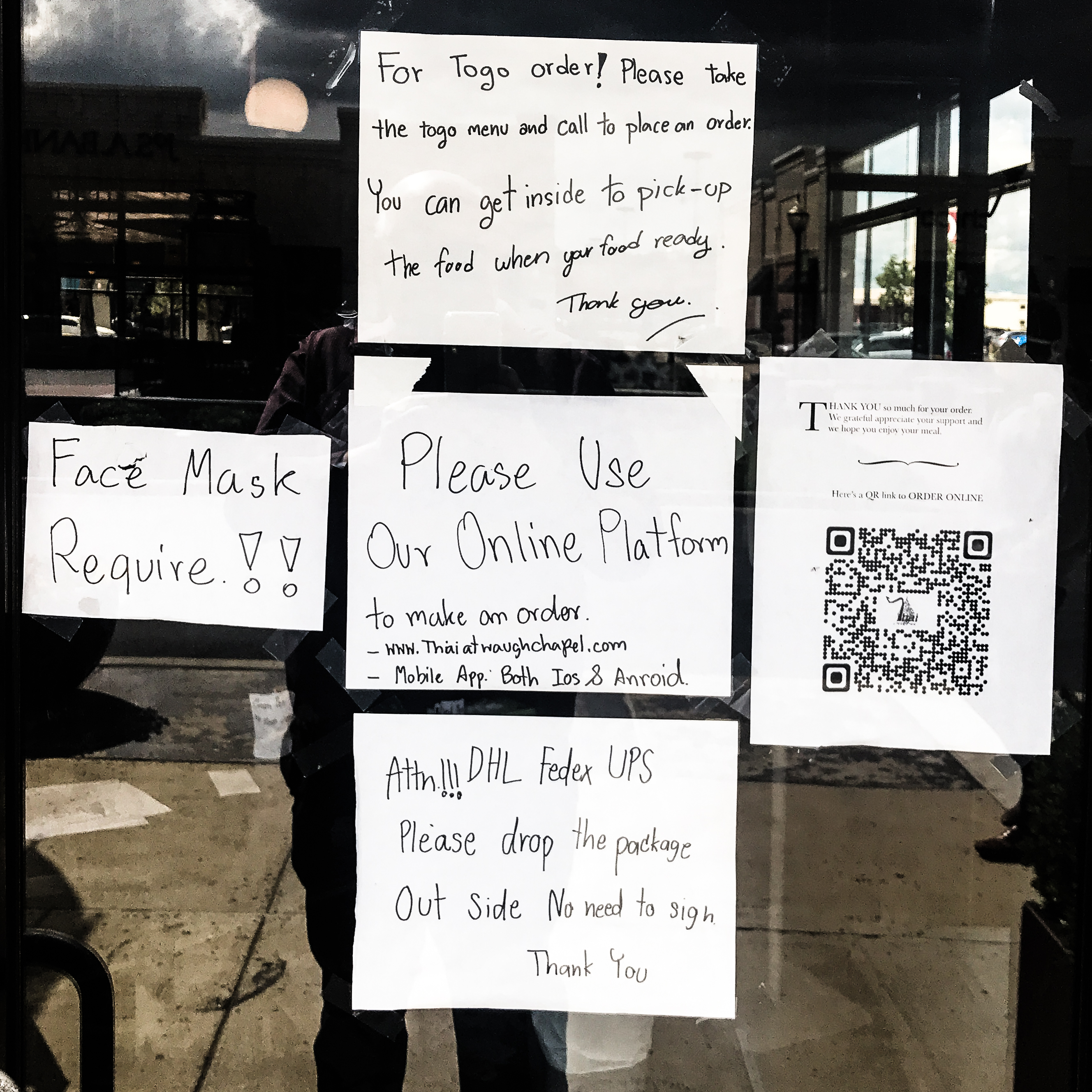
Signs on a Thai Restaurant in Crofton MD

In a February 28 article about how restaurants could prepare for the possibility of a pandemic, Restaurant Business quoted Roslyn Stone, COO of a firm that provides crisis response for restaurants, who emphasized the necessity for restaurants to provide employees with time off for illness. A March 3 story in Nation's Restaurant News characterized the industry as being braced for impact from the virus.

On Sunday, March 15, Ohio governor Mike DeWine and Ohio Health Department director Amy Acton ordered the closure of all bars and restaurants to help slow the spread of the virus, saying the government "encouraged restaurants to offer carryout or delivery service, but they would not be allowed to have people congregating in the businesses." The city of Los Angeles closed all restaurants and bars later that evening and New York City announced all restaurants and bars would close by the following Tuesday, both cities also allowing exceptions for takeout and delivery.

The next day, Illinois, New Jersey, New York state, Connecticut, Kentucky, Pennsylvania, Maryland and Washington, D.C. followed suit. By March 21, at least 25 states had closed restaurants and bars. By March 22 the number had risen to 38. In other states, major cities had closed bars and restaurants to sit-down diners and limited to takeout orders and delivery.

== Impact of closures ==
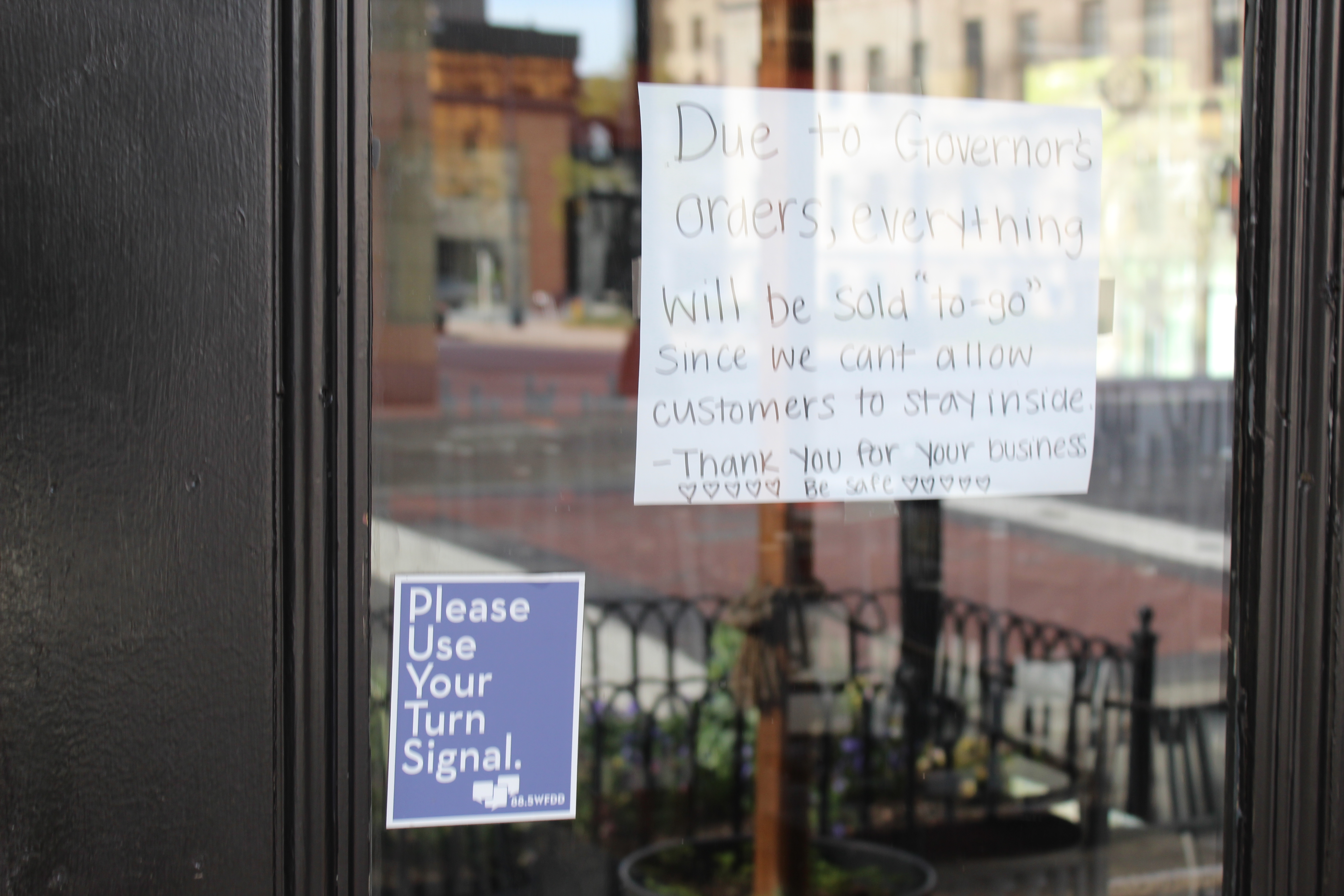
A restaurant that is to-go only due to laws created to stop the spread of the coronavirus

In March 2020, restaurants' daily traffic dropped precipitously as the virus spread, compared to the same period in 2019. According to NPR's Yuki Noguchi, "Just about every restaurant nationwide has been hit hard at once, making this disaster unique." Industry experts warned that many small businesses would not be able to recover from closures without help from the government. Impact on the greater economy was as of March 17 expected to be large as Americans have in recent years spent more at restaurants than at grocery stores. Lester Jones, chief economist of the National Beer Wholesalers Association, said "This is a very significant and traumatic event for the restaurants, bars, taverns and the industry in general." Chris Swonger, CED of the Distilled Spirits Council of the United States, said "The impact on our industry is going to be really, really difficult. It's going to be a real challenge economically for not only the distillers of the United States, but certainly small businesses, restaurants, and bars." Sean Kennedy of the National Restaurant Association on March 19 called the closures a "perfect storm" for the industry, saying the three primary challenges for restaurateurs are short-term access to cash, medium and long-term access to credit, and tax relief when the closures are ended. An investor in two New York City restaurants told the New York Post:

This situation is apocalyptic for the restaurant business. How sad would the city be if the only places that survived were chains? It makes me depressed to even think about it."

— Mark Amadei

The New York Times on March 20 reported that industry analysts were predicting that two thirds of restaurants would not survive, and as many as 75 percent of independents.

Forbes on March 19 estimated the job losses in the restaurant industry to be in the millions. The National Restaurant Association estimated probable job losses to be five to seven million.

Industry experts on March 18 forecast that $225 billion in direct losses and a full economic impact of $675 billion because of additional revenues generated elsewhere in the economy when customers patronize restaurants. Tom Colicchio, speaking with Yahoo Finance on March 23, and other industry experts said the US restaurant industry had seen as many 7 million layoffs. Colicchio, Camilla Marcus, and other prominent chefs and restaurateurs established a trade and lobbying group, the Independent Restaurant Coalition, to lobby for the needs of small and independent restaurants.

Directory and review site Yelp in July announced that 60% of restaurants that closed down completely during the pandemic had marked those closures as permanent for a total of nearly 16,000 restaurants by July 24.

Widespread restaurant closures affected certain food brands. For example, during the third quarter of 2020, Coca-Cola's net revenues decreased by 9%.

=== Notable closings ===
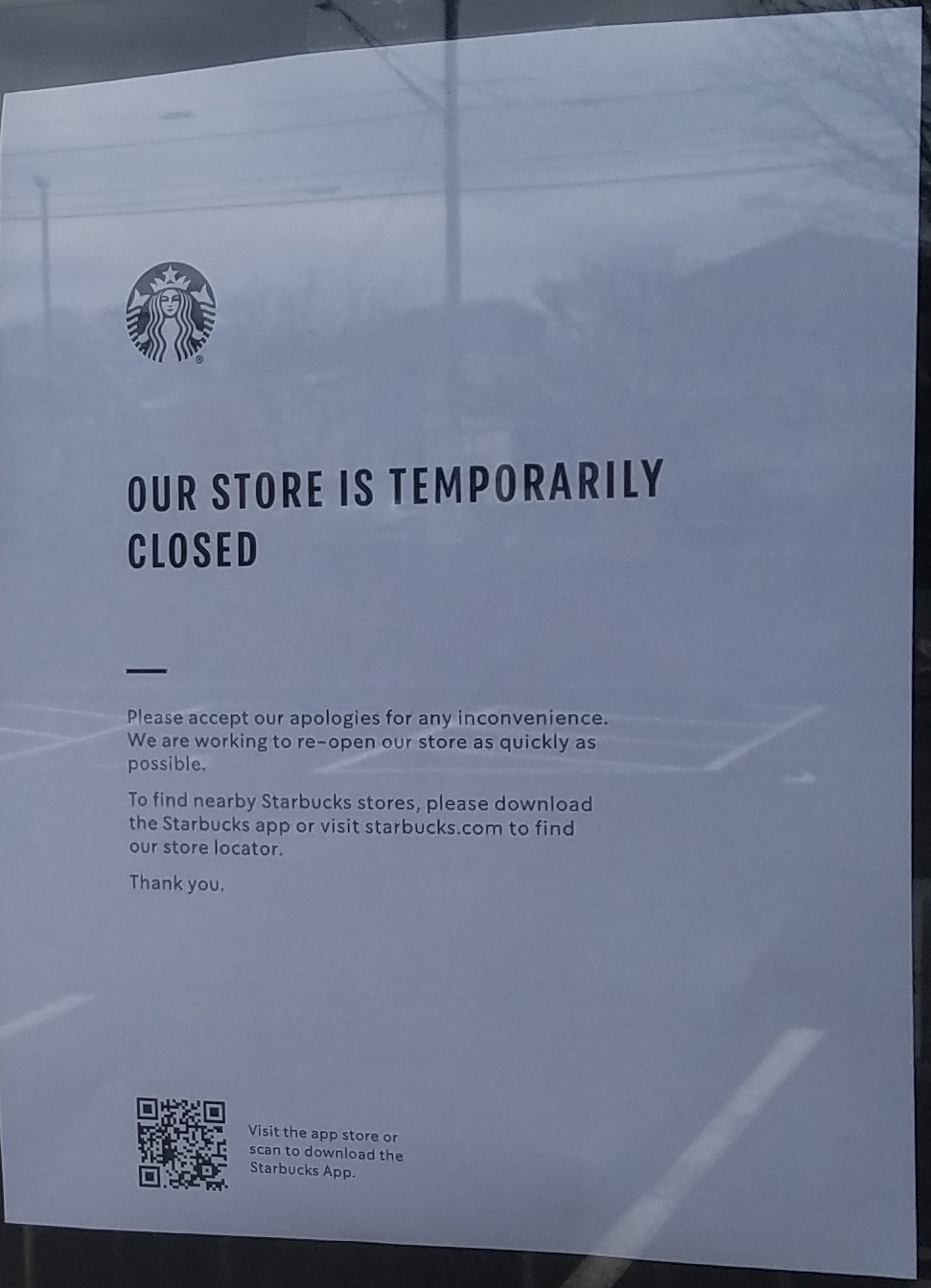
A Starbucks closed due to coronavirus laws in North Carolina

On March 20, McDonald's closed 50 restaurants. On March 21, Starbucks announced company-operated stores in the US and Canada would be limited to drive-thru and delivery orders. Union Square Hospitality Group, which the New York Post described as "largely seen as the gold standard for employment practices in the industry," laid off 2000 employees March 13. Denny's had to contact locksmiths, because franchise agreements require 24/7 service for most locations so they had never closed before.

Souplantation, a soup and salad buffet chain, closed all restaurants and laid of all staff permanently as a result of the COVID pandemic, including all Arizona and California stores. The management team noted they did not see how their buffet concept could survive.

On July 30 Dunkin' Brands announced it would permanently close 800 donut and coffee shops by the end of the year.

Industry journal Restaurant Business in late July 2020 listed some of the oldest independent restaurants in the country that had permanently closed, including Louis' Restaurant in San Francisco, which opened in 1937, John's Famous Stew (Indianapolis, 1911), and Santa Fe Basque (Reno, 1949).

== Notable deaths ==
By June 2020, the United Food and Commercial Workers International Union reported that 238 of its 1.3 million member workers had died of COVID-19.

Herman Cain, CEO of Godfather's Pizza from 1986 to 1996 and the National Restaurant Association from 1996 to 1999, died from COVID-19 in July 2020.

Wayne Kent Taylor, the CEO of Texas Roadhouse, died by suicide in March 2021 while struggling with COVID-19 symptoms including severe tinnitus.

== Industry fallout and reactions ==
The restaurant industry was one of the hardest hit sectors in the country, not only from the initial closings and ongoing partial closings during the early months of the pandemic but due to lasting difficulties with staffing that continued into the mid-2020s.

The partial rather than full closings of restaurants meant that the closings failed to trigger business interruption insurance for many restaurants; other policies had clauses excluding coverage in the case of epidemics, action by civil authority, or requiring restaurants to have physical damage to property. One industry representative said forcing insurers to cover business interruption claims would bankrupt the insurance industry.

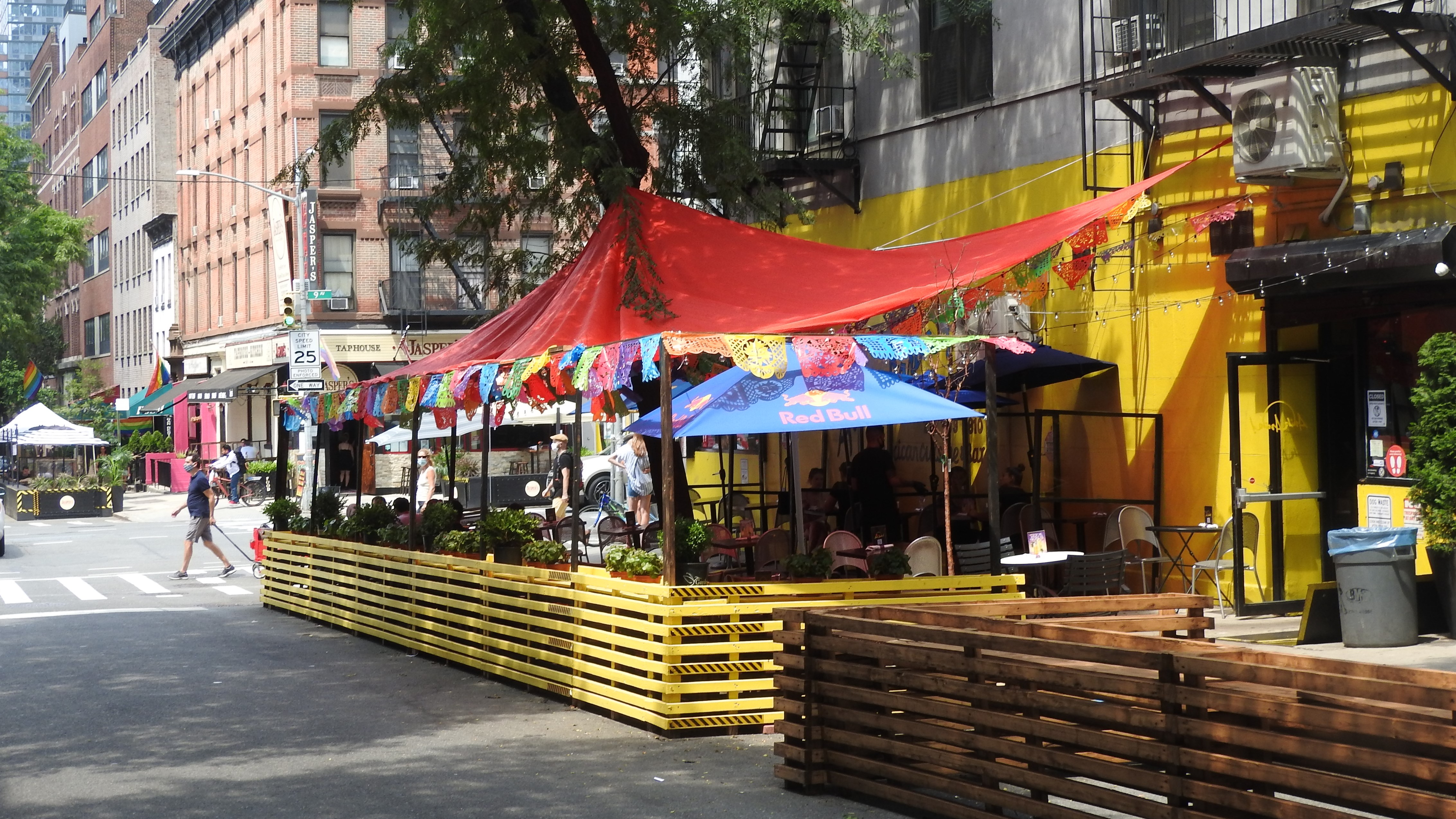
Using temporary street space when dining rooms are closed

As many as 7 million workers were estimated to have been laid off by March 23, and more employees lacked sick leave in the sector compared to similar sectors. The New York Times characterized the closures as affecting "all strata of the industry, from the owners and their celebrity chefs to the waiters and waitresses, bar-backs and busboys, who effectively are facing layoffs and may be unable to pay their rent."

Some restaurants whose business already relied heavily on takeout, such as pizza parlors, saw their takeout business decrease due to the cancellation of all sporting events, which "drive pizza sales" according to one Ohio pizza shop owner. Industry experts have said that takeout and delivery service will also see reduced demand and won't be able to make up the shortfall for restaurants. Some restaurants closed down, some turned to pick up and delivery, and some began doing grocery delivery or meal kit services. On March 23 the New York Post reported that many New York City restaurants were closing down takeout and delivery both due to health concerns for employees and because those businesses were not bringing in enough money.

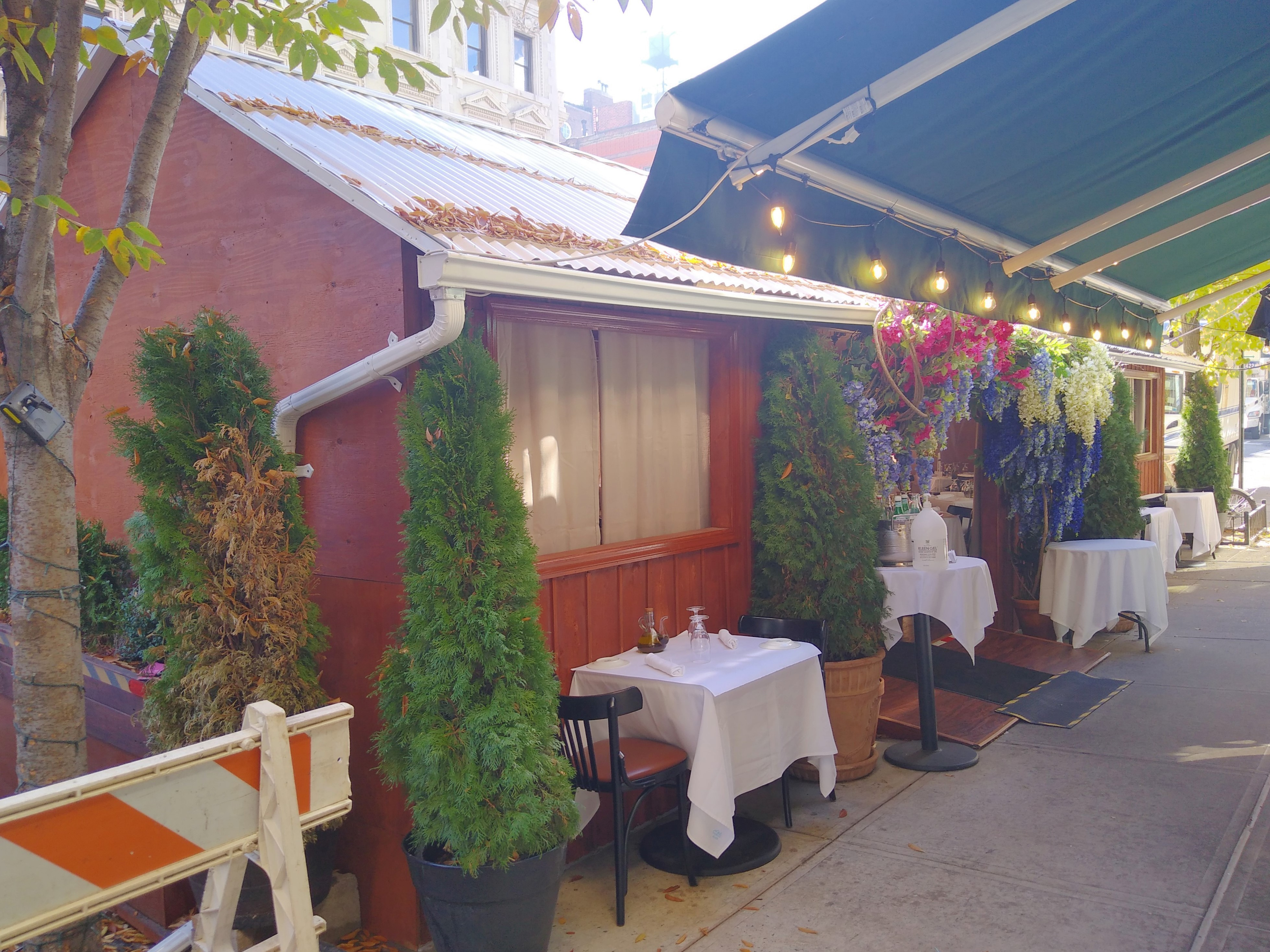
A dining shed set up in New York City as a response to COVID restrictions on indoor dining

On March 18 the National Restaurant Association asked the federal government for at least $145 billion to provide relief to restaurants and restaurant workers.

Groups of restaurateurs in New York City, Cincinnati, Philadelphia and Seattle called on governments to provide help to the nation's small and independent restaurants. On March 19 the New York group called for state governments to issue orders for rent abatements, suspension of sales and payroll taxes, and a full shutdown so that business interruption insurance coverage would be triggered. On March 20, the Cincinnati group called on the federal government to provide a $225 bailout to the restaurant industry. On March 23 the Philadelphia group asked Pennsylvania and the Seattle group asked local, state and federal governments to provide relief for laid off workers and closed restaurant businesses.

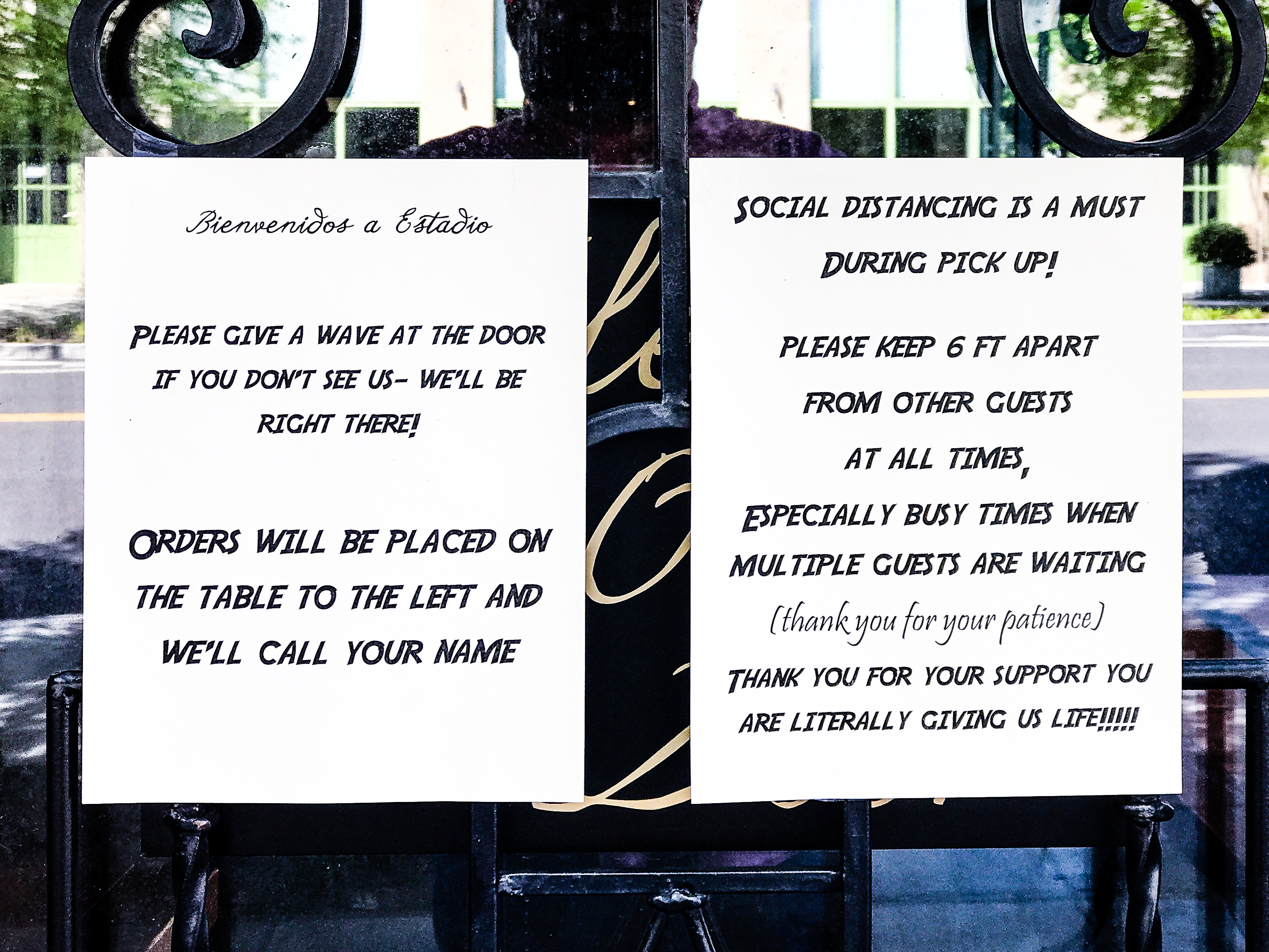
Signs on a Restaurant in Washington DC During COVID-19

Jose Andres, writing in The New York Times on March 22, called on the federal government to fund a food distribution effort that could both feed vulnerable citizens and offer some relief to laid off restaurant workers by employing them to prepare and distribute food where needed. Marcus Samuelsson, writing for CNN.com on March 24, noted that as an owner of businesses in eight countries, he has a unique perspective on how the unemployment insurance program in the US compares to programs in other affected countries. The US system, he said, was designed to "'tide you over' while you quickly find another job", which is not possible during widespread closures. He called on governments to double the benefits, extend them to 200 or more days, and expand them to include health coverage. Gabrielle Hamilton, writing in the New York Times on April 23, described being turned down for an emergency line of credit, having her insurance claim rejected, and learning her laid-off employees hadn't been able to file for unemployment.

With only carry-out and delivery services operating in many states, laid-off servers and bartenders were prompted to create "virtual tip jars" across 23 U.S. cities. In Cincinnati fans of rival basketball teams Xavier and University of Cincinnati competed to leave bigger tips for restaurant workers in a "Crosstown tipoff", a nod to the annual Crosstown Shootout, starting with a tip of $1000 on a $54 carryout order at Zip's Cafe in early January 2021 and accompanied by a note reading "Go Xavier!" UC fans responded with tips of increasing size, and fans of both teams bid up the largest tips; eventually $2000 tips were received at a downtown Skyline Chili and an Oakley pub, both in support of UC.

As a result of a lack of demand from restaurants, schools, businesses and hotels, many farms had to destroy millions of pounds of eggs, vegetables, milk and other goods which were overproduced. The closures of restaurants and the rest of the food service industry, such as schools and event venues, impacted the distribution for food and beverage. In early April, while grocery stores were experiencing shortages of dairy products, farmers whose main customers were in the food service supply chain were dumping their milk because of lack of demand. According to Cornell dairy industry economist Christopher Wolf, "If you have a factory that was set up to produce sour cream to sell at Mexican restaurants, you can't just decide that tomorrow you're gonna produce ice cream and send it to the grocery store."

In mid-April Ohio-based restaurateur Cameron Mitchell told Columbus mayor Andrew Ginther that the business had the ability to reopen a single time but would not survive a second closedown if the economy were reopened too quickly and a second shutdown occurred.

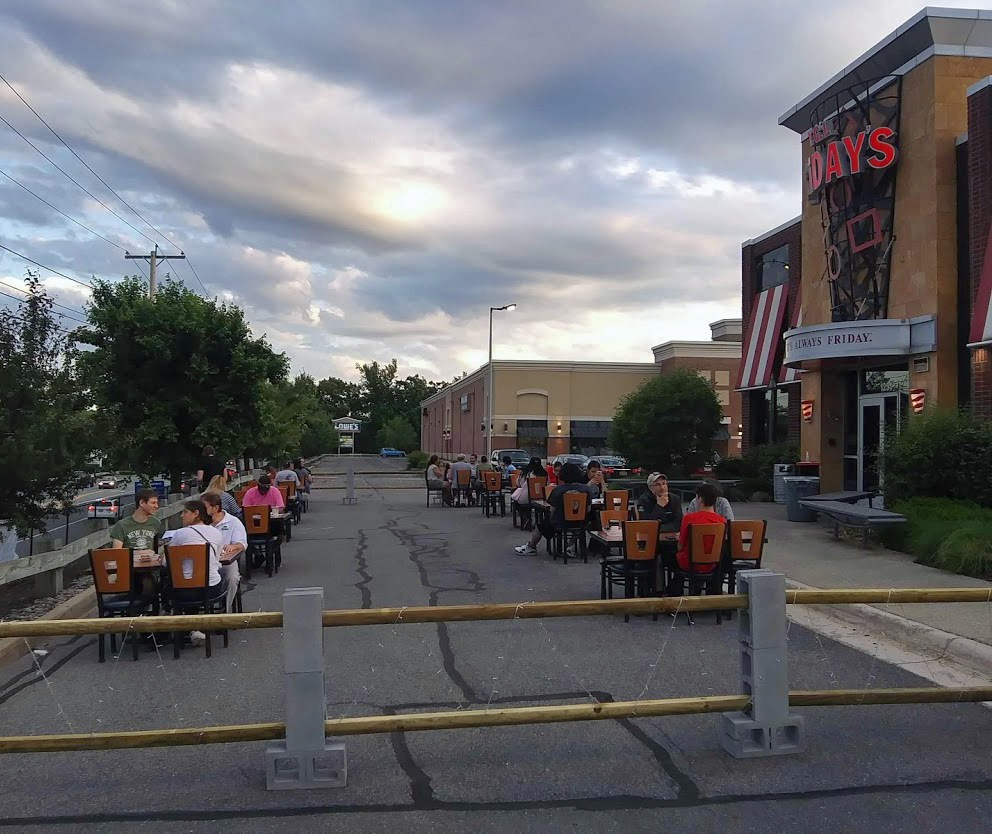
Improvised alfresco dining space in front of an upstate New York TGI Friday's after limited reopenings were allowed in June

By early May, nearly a fifth of Wendy's locations had no beef to serve. Wendy's uses refrigerated, not frozen, meat products, and thus its supply chain is different from that of other fast food restaurants.

As of March 2022 market-research company Datassential estimated that more than 6,000 bars that serve food, and almost 8,000 diners, had closed permanently. As lockdowns eased, many restaurants that reopened did so with earlier closing hours, because a shortage of employees and fewer late-night customers.

== Government response ==
=== State and local government responses ===
Many local and most state governments shut down restaurants and bars starting between March 15 and March 20.

=== Federal response ===
President Trump met via phone on March 19 with leaders of chain restaurant companies, but no independent restaurateurs were included. Participants included Domino's Pizza, McDonald's, Wendy's, Yum! Brands and Darden Restaurants and representatives from the International Franchise Association and the National Retail Federation.

On March 25 the White House and Senate leadership came to an agreement on a $2 trillion stimulus package. The bill was reported to include $250 billion in direct payments to individuals, $350 billion for small business loans, $250 billion for unemployment benefits, and $500 billion for loans to troubled companies. It contains a provision preventing Trump, his family, other top government officials and members of Congress from benefiting from programs and creates an oversight board and inspector general position. Restaurateur and chef Tom Colicchio, who had been active in asking for a government rescue of the industry, later that day said he was feeling "optimistic" about the package.

After large restaurant chains outflanked small and independent restaurants to access the funds, leaving little for the independents, some faced backlash and returned the funds. Funds were depleted with only 5% of small and independent restaurants receiving assistance, even though 60% of small restaurants had applied for funds. The funding had been run through large banks, which favored large restaurants and national chains. The International Franchise Association "bashed" the IRC's proposal, saying all restaurants needed help. The IRC pushed back, saying that small independents were in a unique spot and in more danger than large chains.

In early May legislation was proposed in Congress to allow Americans to use SNAP benefits at restaurants. Currently, food assistance benefits can only be used at restaurants of the state participates in the "Restaurant Meals Program". The proposed SNAP CARRY Act includes provisions to expand access to the restaurant program during emergencies like the pandemic.
