= ServSafe =

American food and beverage safety training program

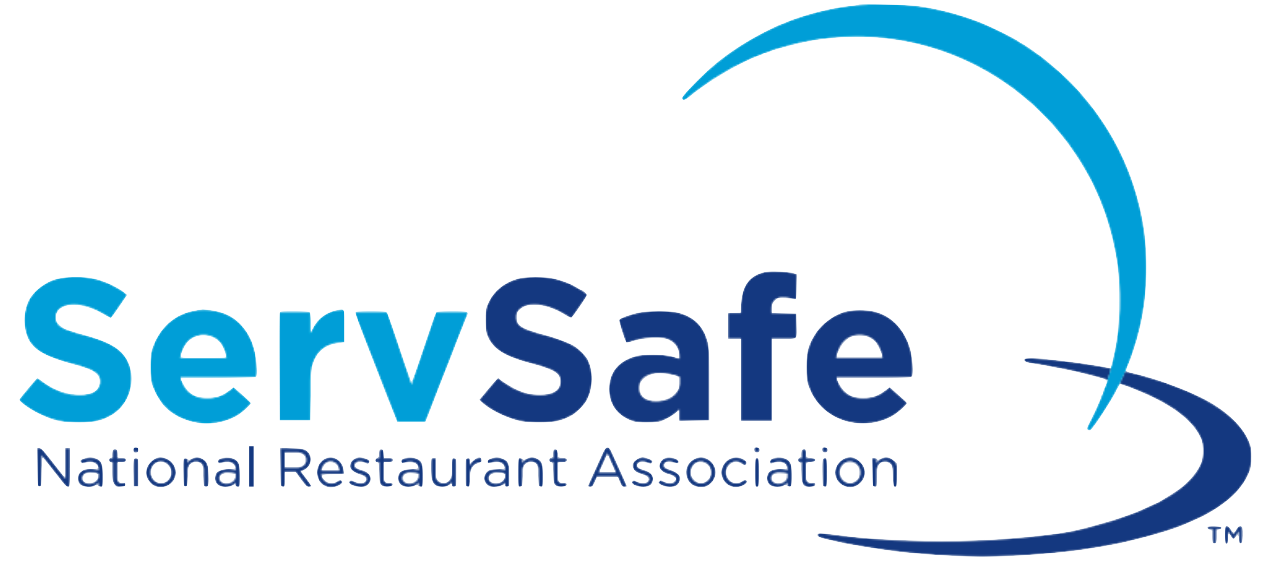
- Industry: Food and beverage safety training and certification
- Headquarters: Chicago, Illinois
- Owners: National Restaurant Association
- Website: www.servsafe.com

ServSafe is a food and beverage safety training and certificate program administered by the US National Restaurant Association. The program is accredited by ANSI and a US nonprofit called the Conference for Food Protection. Its goal is to prevent foodborne illnesses based on a set of guidelines to improve safety and hygiene in the food preparation process.

Sanitation certification is required by most restaurants as a basic credential for their management staff. To date, over 5 million ServSafe Food Protection Manager Certifications have been awarded. ServSafe certifies food managers, food handlers, people who work with alcohol and allergens, and workplaces. There is limited evidence that the ServSafe program drives meaningful improvements in measurable outcomes, however, such as better restaurant hygiene.

ServSafe certifications have generated over $25 million for the NRA since 2010. These proceeds have funded the association's government lobbying arm, which has been a strong advocate against minimum wage increases and other worker protections for much of its history.
