= Environmental Health Registration Board =

Organization

- Abbreviation: EHRB
- Dissolved: Defunct 2021
- Purpose: Awarding body for environmental health in England, Wales and Northern Ireland
- Location: Chadwick Court, 15 Hatfields, London, SE1 8DJ
- Region served: UK
- Affiliations: Chartered Institute of Environmental Health
- Website: EHRB

The Environmental Health Registration Board (EHRB) was a body in the United Kingdom which issued certificates of registration on completion of approved professional qualification programmes and accredited courses of study.

The organisation maintained a register of people who had been issued with such certificates.

The EHRB's activities were closely associated with many aspects of the works of the Chartered Institute of Environmental Health (CIEH). The Board's directors were CIEH members, mainly drawn from the Learning and Qualifications Advisory Group, although nominations to the Board could be made by the Secretary of State for Health (up to two persons), government departments or agencies with an interest in environmental health (for example the Food Standards Agency). Other persons with an appropriate interest in environmental health could also be appointed by the Board.

In March 2018 CIEH announced the closure of EHRB in 2020 but this was subsequently postponed because of the COVID-19 pandemic.

EHRB formally closed in December 2021. At that point its registers were hosted by CIEH.
