= Healthy Dining =

- Industry: Food and drink
- Founded: 1990
- Headquarters: United States
- Website: www.healthydiningfinder.com

Founded in 1990, Healthy Dining is a California-based company offering nutrition analysis services for the restaurant and foodservice industries and is the nutrition partner of the National Restaurant Association. Healthy Dining is staffed by registered dietitians, researchers, and communication and digital professionals who serve as a Menu Labeling partner for restaurants.

== Healthy Dining Finder ==
HealthyDiningFinder.com is an online resource and search tool operated by Healthy Dining that provides guidance in choosing dietitian-approved Healthy Dining menu items and corresponding nutrition information for menu items served at more than 60,000 full-service and quick-serve restaurant locations in the US. Restaurant participation in the Healthy Dining Program has grown substantially since its inception in 1990 as a Southern California, publication-based program.

HealthyDiningFinder.com was developed with partial funding through the Centers for Disease Control and Prevention's (CDC) Small Business Innovative Research (SBIR) program. The site lists nutrition information for menu items that are consistent with recommendations from leading health organizations, health professionals, and government agencies, such as the United States Department of Agriculture (USDA), the American Heart Association (AHA), and the American Diabetes Association (ADA). More than 4,000 qualifying menu choices are featured on the site, including close to 1,000 menu choices meeting the "Sodium Savvy" criteria. The site also provides "Special Request" instructions developed in collaboration with the restaurant to reduce calorie, saturated fat and/or sodium content, such as "order with less cheese (1/2 oz)" or "order with brown rice instead of white rice."

In 2013, Healthy Dining Finder became available in a GPS-enabled mobile format, allowing users on-the-go to access the information.
