= National Registry of Food Safety Professionals =

Food Safety Certification Entity

National Registry of Food Safety Professionals logo

National Registry of Food Safety Professionals (NRFSP) is a U.S.-based food safety certification body for the restaurant, hotel, and quick service industries. Headquartered in Orlando, Florida, NRFSP was founded in 1998 through partnership between the Chartered Institute of Environmental Health (United Kingdom) and Professional Testing, Inc., and is owned by the National Restaurant Association since 2016.

NRFSP's International Certified Food Safety Manager certification program has been accredited by the ANSI National Accredition Board to ANSI/ISO/IEC 17024 Conformity Assessment - Requirements for bodies certifying products, processes and services.

The Food Safety Manager examination is acceptable in all states and jurisdictions that recognize those standards set by the Conference for Food Protection and is an assurance of quality in the development and maintenance of the exams.
