= Chiesina Uzzanese =

- Comune
- Comune di Chiesina Uzzanese
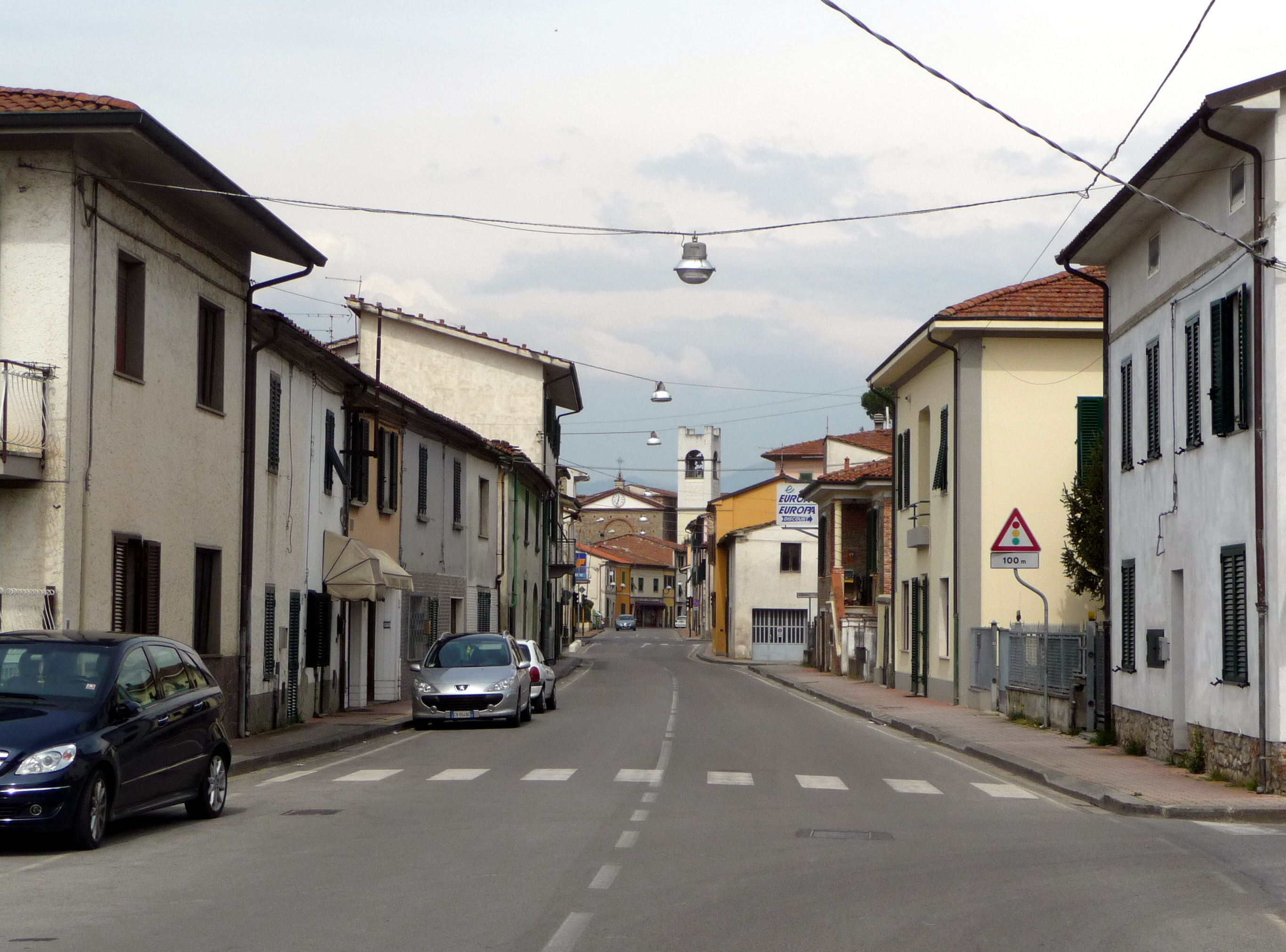
- Center of Chiesina Uzzanese

- Location within Italy Location within Tuscany
- Coordinates: 43°50′N 10°43′E
- Country: Italy
- Region: Tuscany
- Province: Pistoia (PT)
- Frazioni: Capanna, Chiesanuova, Molin Nuovo

Government
  - Mayor: Marco Borgioli

Area
  - Total: 7.2 km^{2} (2.8 sq mi)
- Elevation: 20 m (66 ft)

Population (30 June 2017)
  - Total: 4,582
  - Density: 640/km^{2} (1,600/sq mi)
- Demonym: Chiesinesi
- Time zone: UTC+1 (CET)
  - Summer (DST): UTC+2 (CEST)
- Postal code: 51013
- Dialing code: 0572
- Patron saint: Madonna della Neve
- Saint day: August 5
- Website: Official website

Chiesina Uzzanese is a comune (municipality) in the Province of Pistoia in the Italian region Tuscany, located about 45 kilometres (28 mi) west of Florence and about 20 kilometres (12 mi) southwest of Pistoia.

Chiesina Uzzanese borders the following municipalities: Altopascio, Buggiano, Fucecchio, Montecarlo, Pescia, Ponte Buggianese, Uzzano.

== Twin towns ==
Chiesina Uzzanese is twinned with:

- Saint-Memmie, France

== Monuments and places of interest ==
- The church of "Santa Maria della Neve" was built in 1848 as evidenced by an inscription on the western side of the building. The current church was built on the site of an older and smaller building which stood perpendicular to the current facade. The only remnant of the ancient building is the seventeenth-century altarpiece which today constitutes the entrance portal.
- Xenodochio, around 1300, in the main square of the town.
- The remains of the mill in the hamlet of Molinuovo.
- Oratory of the Most Holy Rosary, in the Molinuovo hamlet.
- Church of Santa Maria di Loreto, in the hamlet of Chiesanuova.
- Mural by the artist Filippo Biagioli and the young people of "La Bottega".

== People ==
- Agostino Giuntoli, nightclub owner
