= Stephen Battersby =

British activist

Stephen Batterbsy MBE
- Citizenship: British
- Education: University of Surrey
- Known for: pest control
- Scientific career
- Fields: Environmental Health
- Workplaces: Chartered Institute of Environmental Health
- Thesis: Public health implications of urban rat infestations

Stephen Battersby MBE is a British practitioner of environmental health and an advocate for housing standards. He is also known for his leadership as chief author of Clay's Handbook of Environmental Health.

Battersby is a Chartered Fellow of the Chartered Institute of Environmental Health (CIEH), and has held a number of leadership positions within the organisation, including president from 2008 through 2011. As of 2019, he served as one of CIEH's vice presidents.

Battersby received his PhD from the University of Surrey, where his dissertation explored the public health implications of urban rat infestation. He is a Visiting Senior Research Fellow at the Robens Centre for Public and Environmental Health at the University of Surrey, and an associate of the Safe and Healthy Housing Unit at the University of Warwick. From 2013 to 2015, he was chair of the board of Generation Rent (formerly known as the National Private Tenants Organisation).

In 2014, he was invested as a Member of the Most Excellent Order of the British Empire.
