= Starwood Hotels and Resorts =

American hotel and leisure company

Starwood Hotels and Resorts Worldwide, Inc.

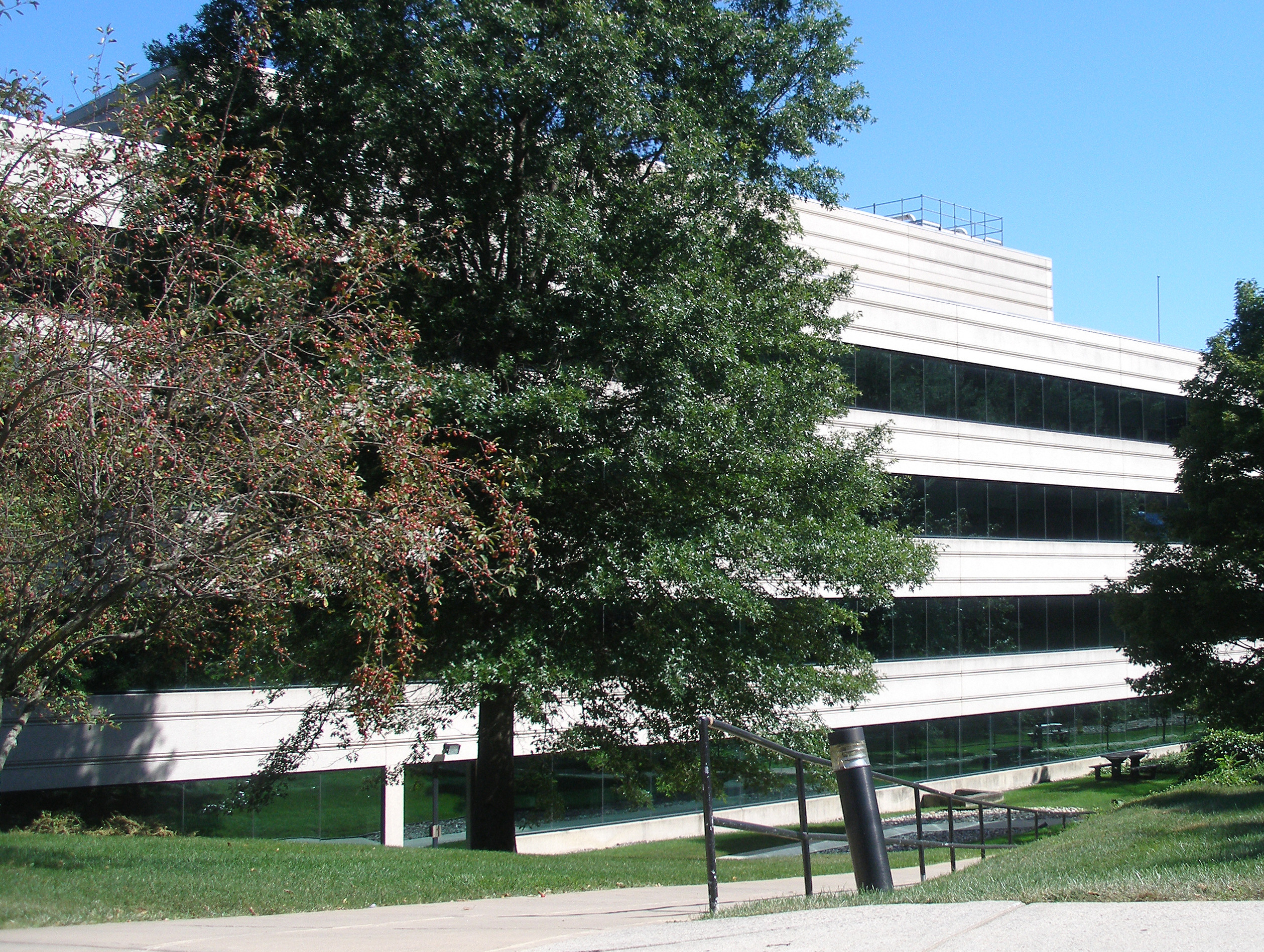
- Former headquarters in White Plains, New York
- Type: Public
- Traded as: NYSE: HOT
- Industry: Hospitality
- Founded: 1969; 57 years ago (as Hotel Investors Trust); Reorganized in 1995; 31 years ago
- Defunct: September 23, 2016; 9 years ago
- Fate: Acquired by Marriott International
- Headquarters: Stamford, Connecticut
- Products: Hotels, resorts
- Brands: St. Regis; The Luxury Collection; W Hotels; Sheraton; Westin; Le Meridien; Tribute Portfolio; Design Hotels; Four Points; Aloft; Element
- Revenue: ▲$5.763 billion (2015)
- Operating income: ▲$0.740 billion (2015)
- Net income: ▲$0.489 billion (2015)
- Total assets: ▲$8.266 billion (2015)
- Total equity: ▲$1.299 billion (2015)

Starwood Hotels and Resorts Worldwide, Inc. was one of the largest companies that owned, operated, franchised and managed hotels, resorts, spas, residences, and vacation ownership properties. Starwood was founded in 1969 as a real estate investment trust named Hotel Investors Trust. In 1995, it was acquired and reorganized by Barry Sternlicht, who was its chairman until 2005 and founder of the Starwood Capital Group. Starwood had 11 brands and owned, managed, or franchised 1,297 properties comprising 370,000 hotel rooms in approximately 100 countries. It was acquired by Marriott International in 2016.

== History ==
=== Under Starwood Capital Group ===
Former Starwood logo

Starwood Hotels and Resorts was originally formed by the real estate investment firm Starwood Capital to take advantage of a tax break; at the time the company was known as Starwood Lodging. Initially, Starwood Lodging owned a number of hotels throughout North America, all under different brand names. The Westin Hotel Company was purchased in 1994 from Aoki Corporation of Japan. Starwood acquired the Sheraton, Four Points by Sheraton, and The Luxury Collection brands from ITT Sheraton in 1998.

In 1999, Starwood launched their "W" Hotels brand. In September 2005, Starwood announced the launch of Aloft, a new hotel brand based on W. Aloft Hotels catered toward business travelers. In 2005, Starwood purchased the Le Méridien brand.

In 2004, Starwood's founder and CEO Barry Sternlicht stepped down as CEO to focus his attention on his other firm, Starwood Capital. He remained on the Board of Directors until 2005. He was succeeded as CEO by Steven J. Heyer, and Starwood began selling a number of its company-owned hotels, instead focusing on becoming a management company and franchiser for its current and future hotel brands. In April 2007, Steven J. Heyer left the company on the request of the Board of Directors because of an issue with Heyer's management style and after allegations of personal misconduct. Chairman of the Board Bruce Duncan served as interim CEO until September 2007, when the company announced Heyer's successor, Frits van Paasschen. Van Paasschen served as CEO until February 2015, when he announced that he was resigning in a mutual decision with the board of directors.

In November 2009, Starwood announced that it would be moving its headquarters from White Plains, New York to Stamford, Connecticut by January 2012.

In late May 2014 reports surfaced that the company had recently made a takeover bid for InterContinental Hotels Group worth $10 billion, which neither company confirmed or denied. In November 2015, it was announced that Starwood would be acquired by Marriott International for $12.2 billion. In December 2015, Thomas B. Mangas, former head of Armstrong World Industries' flooring business, became the CEO at Starwood Hotels & Resorts Worldwide effective December 31, 2015.

On November 30, 2018, Marriott International disclosed that its Starwood brand had been subject to a security breach. After the disclosure, New York Attorney General Barbara Underwood announced an investigation into the data breach.

== Brands ==
=== Westin ===
Westin Hotels & Resorts was Starwood's largest upscale hotel and resorts brand. It was the oldest brand within Starwood, founded as Western Hotels in 1930, renamed Western International Hotels in 1963, and then Westin Hotels in 1981. The chain was acquired by Starwood in 1997.

=== Sheraton ===
Sheraton Hotels and Resorts was Starwood's flagship brand, providing luxury hotel and resort accommodation. It began operating in 1937 and was sold to Starwood in 1998 by ITT Inc. Also under the Sheraton brand are seven vacation ownership properties.

=== The Luxury Collection ===
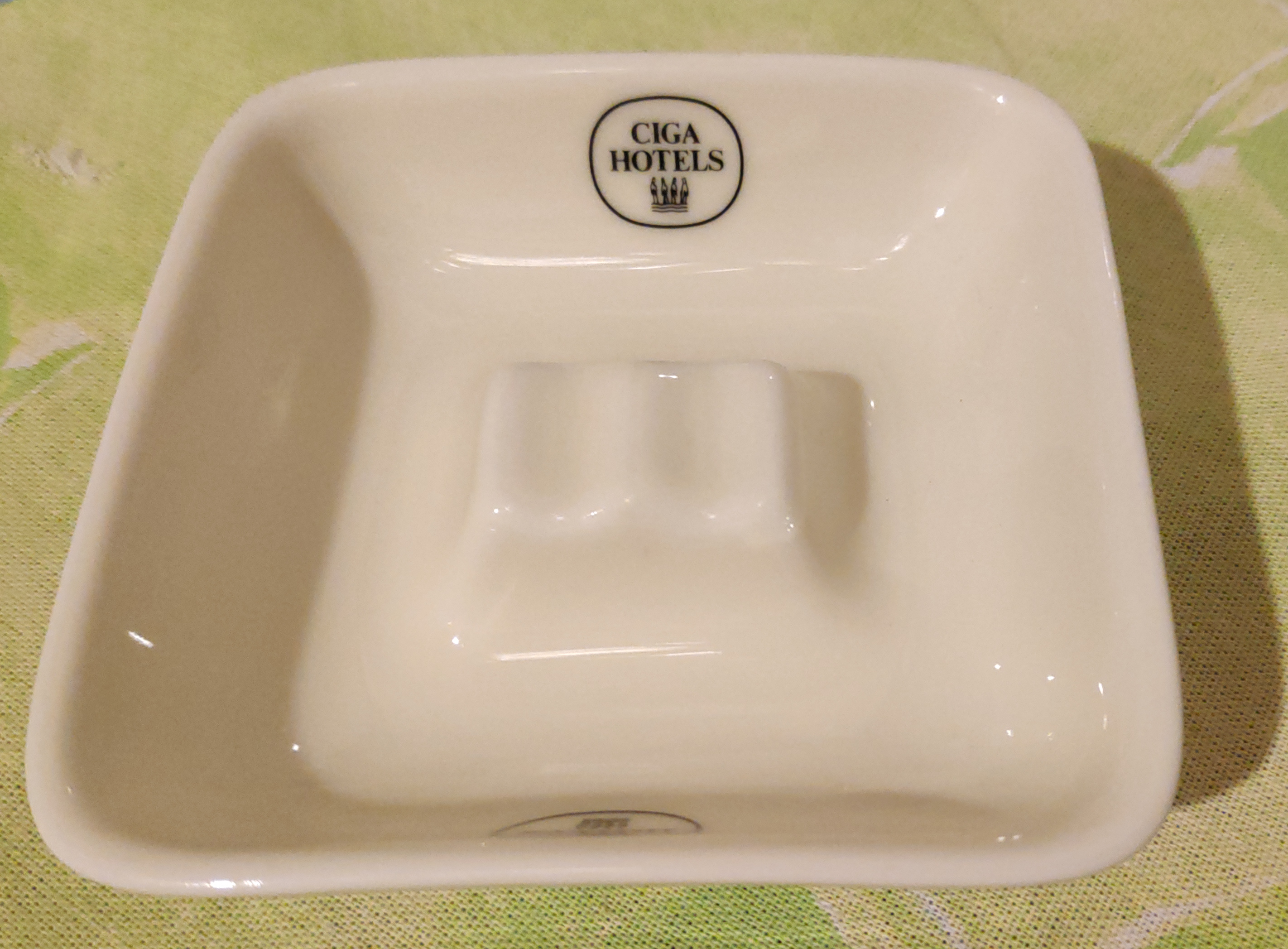
CIGA Hotels ashtray with the classic logo.

The Luxury Collection brand began on January 13, 1992, when ITT Sheraton designated 28 of its premier hotels and 33 of the Sheraton Towers, the luxury "hotel-within-a-hotel" facilities located within Sheraton's largest and most exclusive hotels, as the ITT Sheraton Luxury Collection.

In February 1994, ITT Sheraton acquired a controlling interest in CIGA (Compagnia Italiana Grandi Alberghi, or Italian Grand Hotels Company), an Italian international hotel chain which owned several luxury properties in Europe. The majority of the CIGA hotels were folded into The Luxury Collection. CIGA's original logo, the four horses of St. Mark, was kept for The Luxury Collection brand logo until 2010; each Luxury Collection hotel now uses its own logo. After Starwood acquired Sheraton, it established a separate brand identity for The Luxury Collection. Many hotels in The Luxury Collection are smaller establishments in converted palaces or other historically/culturally significant buildings; others are restored historic hotels, such as Hotel Kämp in Helsinki, Finland.

The Royal Penthouse Suite at Hotel President Wilson in Geneva, part of The Luxury Collection, billed at US$65,000 per night, is listed at number 1 on the World's 15 Most Expensive Hotel Suites list compiled by CNN in 2012.

=== Four Points by Sheraton ===
Four Points by Sheraton was launched in April 1995 under the Sheraton Group's brand as a set of mid-range hotels that replaced the Sheraton Inn sub-brand of Sheraton.

=== W Hotels ===
W Hotels was Starwood's luxury lifestyle brand, generally marketed towards a younger crowd. It was launched in 1998 with the W New York, a conversion of the old Doral Inn hotel at 541 Lexington Avenue in Manhattan and the brand has since expanded with over 50 hotels and resorts.

Though the hotels vary from newly built flagship properties to more modest conversions of previous hotels, they have a common theme of spare, minimalist modern decor and hip, informal names for categories of rooms and public areas. For example, the lobbies of all the hotels are known as the "Living Room". W Hotels attempt to include the letter "W" wherever possible - the swimming pool is known as "Wet" and the laundry bag in every room is known as “Wash”. W Hotels are known for the trademarked “Whatever/Whenever” service philosophy and pioneered the now popular “lifestyle” hotels.

=== St. Regis ===
St. Regis Hotels & Resorts was Starwood's main luxury brand, launched in 1899. It is named for St. Regis New York, which was built in 1904 in Manhattan at 5th Avenue and 55th Street by John Jacob Astor IV, who also founded the Astoria Hotel (which later became the Waldorf-Astoria Hotel) and who died in 1912 on the RMS Titanic. In the 1930s, head bartender Fernand Petiot introduced the Bloody Mary cocktail. The St. Regis was a Sheraton from 1966 on, and following a lavish restoration from 1985 to 1991, it was part of the ITT Sheraton Luxury division before it became the cornerstone and flagship of Starwood's new brand. The brand is represented on four continents, with a total pipeline of 57 operating and signed hotels as of April 2016.

=== Le Méridien ===
Le Méridien was founded by Air France in 1972 and was acquired by Starwood in November 2005, by which point it was based in the UK. It has a total of 137 properties operating or in the pipeline worldwide, with its first property being Le Méridien Etoile in Paris. Le Méridien is positioned as an upper-upscale brand in the Starwood hierarchy and offers properties with an edge towards art, design and local destination, with each hotel customized to its respective location with the intent of "unlocking destinations" for guests. Certain locations offer guests complimentary access to art galleries and museums through collaborations and partnerships. Le Méridien has a partnership with the Italian coffee roasting company Illy, serving and promoting Illy-branded coffee and products throughout its hotels around the world.

=== Aloft ===
Aloft Hotels was launched in 2005 as Aloft, a Vision of W Hotels, in a relationship with W similar to Four Points by Sheraton and its 'brand parent', Sheraton. Aloft is a mid-scale, urban-style business/boutique hotel brand.

=== Element ===
Announced in 2006, and originally known as Element by Westin, Element was Starwood's first brand of hotels intended to be environmentally friendly and LEED certified. The designs include energy and water efficient features. The first Element hotel opened in Lexington, Massachusetts, in July 2008. Element hotels are built eco-friendly from the ground up, from the floors made of recycled materials to energy-efficient lighting and plumbing fixtures.

In 2013, the first Canadian location opened in Vaughan, Ontario. In September 2014, the first German location opened in Frankfurt. In 2017, the first South East Asian location opened in Kuala Lumpur, Malaysia.

=== Tribute Portfolio ===
Launched in April 2015, Tribute Portfolio is a collection of independent upscale to upper upscale hotels. As of May 2019, there were 33 Tribute Portfolio hotels operating globally with over 45 hotels in the pipeline.

In April 2018, Marriott began a pilot program offering vacation rentals under the Tribute Portfolio brand. As part of the test, the company partnered with Hostmaker to add 200 homes in London to the service. This pilot ended when Marriott launched Homes & Villas by Marriott International in April 2019.

=== Design Hotels ===
Design Hotels, based in Berlin, provides hospitality services to a network of nearly 300 independently owned and operated hotels. Starwood was a majority investor in Design Hotels since 2011. In October 2015, Starwood announced that it would add Design Hotels to its brand portfolio. Member hotels of the Design Hotels collection had the option to join the Starwood Preferred Guest loyalty program and gain access to Starwood's sales platform.

== Business partnerships and customer programs ==
Starwood had a credit card partnership with American Express, which also took over Starwood's former partnership with MBNA Canada Bank in Canada in 2010.

The Starwood Preferred Guest (SPG) program was merged with Marriott's loyalty program on August 18, 2018.

Starwood Preferred Guest also had a partnership with 32 airlines, allowing guests to redeem their points for flights under the "SPG Flights" program. SPG had a "crossover rewards" program with Delta Air Lines, offering Medallion elite members certain elite benefits at Starwood Group hotels and offering certain Medallion elite benefits to SPG Platinum Preferred Guest members. The SPG program had over 21 million members.
