= International Federation of Environmental Health =

Environmental health professional organization

- Abbreviation: IFEH
- Formation: 1986
- Legal status: Company limited by guarantee
- Purpose: To provide a focal point for national organisations of practitioners, whose concern is the care of the environment in the interests of the public health
- Headquarters: Chadwick Court
- Location: 15 Hatfields, Southwark, London, SE1 8DJ, UK
- Region served: Global
- President: Bruno Cvetković
- Main organ: Council
- Website: ifeh.org

The International Federation of Environmental Health is an organisation whose full members are national associations representing the interests of environmental health professionals throughout the world.

It disseminates knowledge about environmental health among people and promotes cooperation between countries to improve the environmental situation of Earth.

The IFEH was established in 1986 as a company limited by guarantee, registered number 02026062 and is based in London, England.

== Members ==
In 2018 IFEH listed over 40 counties' national Environmental Health organisations as full members, as well as a number of academic and other organisations as associate members.

== Activities ==
As well as acting as a focal point for those concerned with the protection of the environment in the interests of human health the IFEH promotes networking of members and cooperation among countries including the interchange of professionals engaged in environmental health work. It also disseminates the results of research and provides a means of exchanging information and educational standards.

It organises an annual congress held in different countries each year. The 2020 conference was cancelled and the 2021 conference will be held online due to COVID-19.

The federation declared World Environmental Health Day celebrated each year on 26 September.
