= Bimbo's 365 Club =

Coordinates: 37.803727°N 122.415591°W

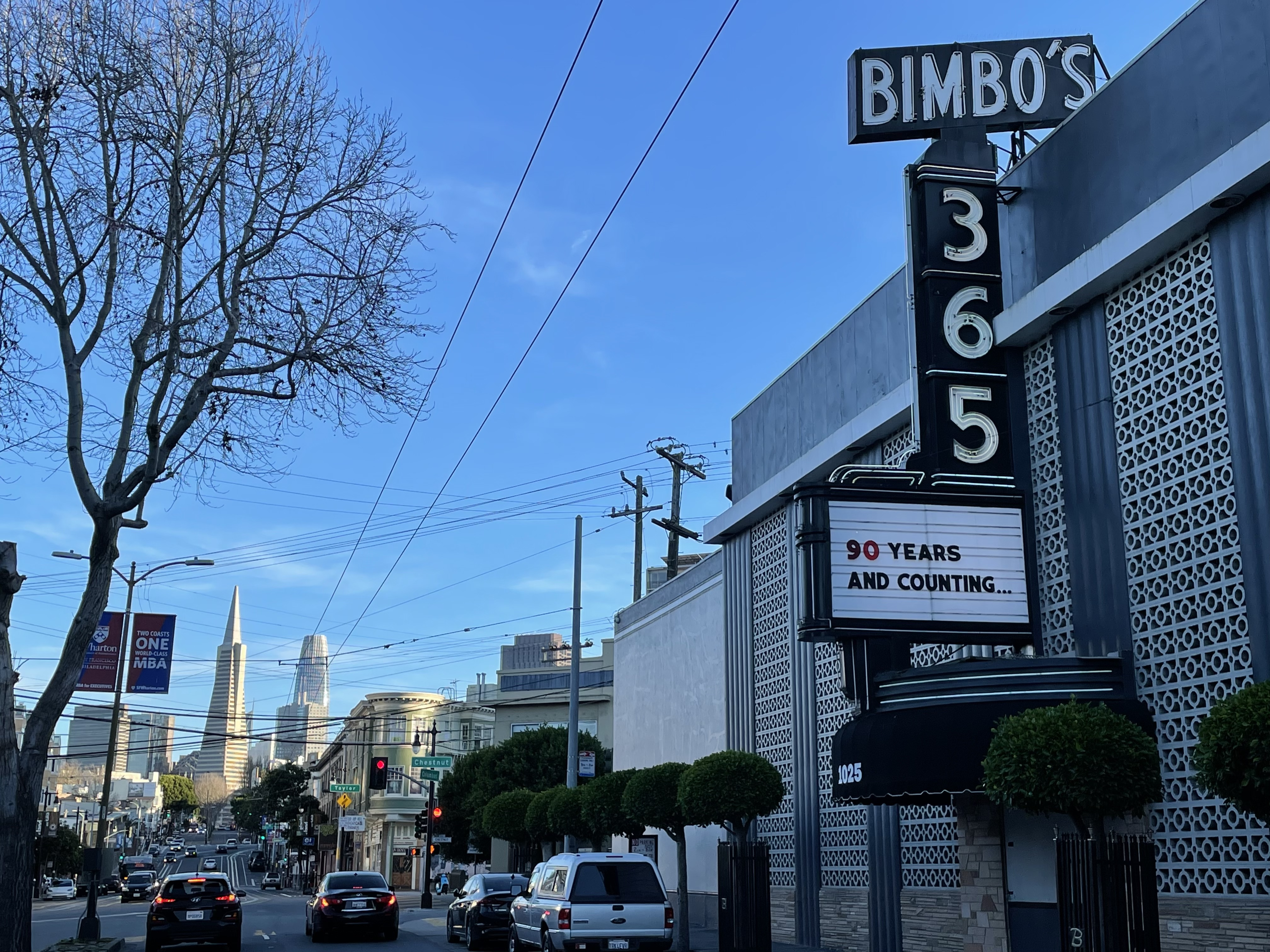
- Interactive map of Bimbo's 365 Club

Restaurant information
- Established: 1931
- Location: 1025 Columbus Avenue, San Francisco, California, 94133, United States
- Seating capacity: 475 (dinner seating); 685 (theater-style seating)
- Website: www.bimbos365club.com

Bimbo's 365 Club, also known as Bimbo's 365, is an entertainment club located at 1025 Columbus Avenue in San Francisco. It specializes in live rock and jazz shows. The location is one of San Francisco's oldest nightclub sites, and has operated under two names with a series of owners. The building started as Bal Tabarin in 1931, the same year that the 365 Club started at 365 Market Street. The two locations under separate ownership consolidated in 1951 to one location owned by Agostino "Bimbo" Giuntoli.

== History ==
=== 365 Club ===
Giuntoli was born and raised in Tuscany, Italy; and, in 1922 at the age of 19, he began to work his way to San Francisco. He labored as a janitor at the Palace Hotel and then as a cook nearby, where Monk Young, the young cook's boss, was unable to pronounce his name. Young called him bimbo instead, a diminutive of bambino, Italian for "boy", and the nickname stuck.

The 365 Club began in 1931 as a speakeasy and after-hours gambling club, located on the third floor loft of a building at 365 Market Street near the southeast corner of Fremont Street in San Francisco, owned by Young and managed by Giuntoli. It soon became the most popular illicit drinking establishment in town. Musical artists and dancers showcased their work, including a young Rita Hayworth dancing in the chorus line. An optical illusion achieved by mirrors made the large fish tank above the bar appear to have a nude woman swimming in it. Bar patrons marveled at Dolfina, "the Girl in the Fishbowl".

In 1950, "Bimbo" Giuntoli, by that time sole owner of the 365 Club, arranged to purchase 1025 Columbus Avenue and transfer his operation there.

=== Bal Tabarin ===
The Columbus Avenue site was originally known as the Bal Tabarin, a nightclub that featured dancing to famous bands and a multi-act floor show including a line of showgirls. Restaurateur and businessman Bob Grison partnered with popular bandleader Tom Gerun (born Gerunovich) and Frank Martinelli, manager of a nightclub called the Roof Garden, to establish a nightclub in 1930. Gerunovich's orchestra had played at the Roof Garden (northwest corner of Broadway and Kearny streets, later, the location of Enrico Banducci's Enrico's Sidewalk Cafe) from 1928 to 1930 and made several 78 rpm records for the Brunswick label. During a nationwide tour in mid-1929 he anglicized his name to Gerun. In 1931, in anticipation of the repeal of Prohibition in the United States, architect Timothy L. Pflueger was contracted to create an elegant, sophisticated nightclub and cocktail bar. The bar itself was implemented in the Moderne style later called Art Deco. The stage design used Pflueger's patented indirect lighting hidden behind curved strips of decorative metal. The color coming from behind the façade could be changed smoothly from one hue to another. Two years later, with alcohol bans officially lifted nationwide, the Bal Tabarin was issued California's first new liquor license, and in 1934 Pflueger gave the nightclub a quick renovation. The popularity of the club netted for Pflueger a series of contracts to design cocktail lounges for prominent hotels in San Francisco, including the Cirque Room at the Fairmont Hotel (which survives in its entirety, though it is no longer in use as a bar) and the Mark Hopkins' Top of the Mark, the interior of which has been remodeled to the point where no trace of the original design remains.

In 1936, a 13-year-old Ann Miller took a job dancing at Bal Tabarin, by lying about her age – local law required workers to be 18 in a restaurant that served alcohol. On a night when Miller was appearing alongside Sophie Tucker and Tony Martin, Lucille Ball and an RKO Pictures studio agent came to watch the show. Miller was signed to RKO shortly afterwards, – though some sources say this occurred at The Black Cat Club.

Owner Tom Gerun contracted for several more show runs with Sophie Tucker through the 1940s. The club put on two floor shows a night, one at 9 or 9:30 and one starting around midnight. Gerun took the show some 120 miles (190 km) south to Fort Ord to entertain U.S. Army troops for a special engagement in August 1941. Other bands taking part in the show were Carl Ravazza and his Palace Hotel Band, and Robert Nurok and his band from the Alcazar nightclub. Coming from the Bal Tabarin were Bob Saunders and his band, Señor Wences (a ventriloquist), singer-actress Gertrude Niesen, and the Duncan Sisters with their vaudeville act. After World War II started in earnest for the United States, Martinelli joked with a Billboard reporter that it was easy to get big-name stars to perform at his club, but asked "can you tell me where I can get one waiter and two dishwashers? Those are the rare birds these days." After the war, Gerun hosted NBC broadcasts of Ted Lewis and his band, announced by Bill Roddy, performed live from the nightclub's stage. This activity was not enough to keep the club solvent – in 1947 Billboard reported their doors shut for a time so that the owners could save money as they attempted to sign a major musical artist. Gerun and Martinelli also admitted they were seeking a buyer for the place.

=== Bimbo's 365 ===
In November 1950, Gerun and Martinelli sold the property to Agustino "Bimbo" Giuntoli for a reported $100,000, the equivalent of $1,338,000 in current value. The arrangement allowed the former owners to operate through January 1951, giving Giuntoli the keys on February 1. Giuntoli planned to hold the 365 Club on 365 Market Street open until July 1, 1951, when renovations to the former Bal Tabarin were to be completed. The new location was to be named Bimbo's 365. Giuntoli expanded the kitchen and added another bar but kept the older Pflueger bar in its original place.

Giuntoli's new location was soon a success, with engagements by musical artists such as accordionist Dick Contino, Latin bandleader Xavier Cugat with Charo, singer and trumpeter Louis Prima, bandleader and trumpeter Ray Anthony, entertainer Joey Bishop, lounge music composer Esquivel and many more. Comedians such as Sid Caesar, Rodney Dangerfield, Shecky Greene and Totie Fields performed. Popular columnist Herb Caen commented favorably on the array of acts, writing "Bimbo's [has] jugglers, dance teams, stand-up comics, crooners, chantootsies, Stage Door Johns, a proper band in proper uniforms ... multi-course dinners, red sparkling burgundy in the silver bucket..." as well as magician/movie actor Channing Pollock. In the late 1960s, the club expanded from its lounge atmosphere to put artists such as Smokey Robinson and the Miracles, Marvin Gaye, Dionne Warwick, Neil Diamond, Glen Campbell and The Fifth Dimension on the bill.

In 1970, Giuntoli retired. For the next 18 years, the building was mostly closed, available only on a rental basis for private parties. One notable series of dates was in 1975 when local promoter David Allen put The Tubes on stage, extending their show week after week in response to standing-room only crowds. The Stooges also appeared once in early 1974, playing to a sparse crowd, with lead singer Iggy Pop wearing only bikini briefs and boots on stage. During his performance, he jumped into a small group of fans in front of the stage and his bikini briefs were removed by one of them. He regained the stage while yelling in anger at a female fan who had been handling his genitals. In 1988, Giuntoli's grandson Michael Cerchiai reopened the property for a run as a live entertainment venue. As of 2014, the club is still there, owned and run by Cerchiai, who celebrated his eighth birthday there with a Batman-themed cake, while Smokey Robinson played live.

In recent years, the club has hosted Adele (2008), Laura Marling (2011), The Black Angels (2012), and The Flaming Lips (2012).

== Venue information ==
Currently, Bimbo's 365 Club is available for rental to private parties, owned and operated by Giuntoli's grandsons. Corporate clients such as the National Academy of Recording Arts and Sciences, Oracle and Yahoo! have engaged the club for company events. Artists such as Chris Isaak, Macy Gray, Jewel and The Brian Setzer Orchestra have performed in recent years. British stars Robbie Williams and Roni Size have appeared on stage.

In 2000, production manager Scott Burke initiated a major refurbishment of the venue's sound system. He removed an aging Meyer Sound Laboratories system and installed a Nexo Alpha system, made by Nexo SA of France. Jim Sides, then of Nexo USA based in San Rafael, California, helped Burke select Nexo dealer Art Yeap of Novo Group in San Francisco to head the project. The loudspeakers were rigged with care such that they did not block sight lines to the small side stage adjoining the main stage. A Midas 48-channel XL-200 mixing console was placed at the rear of the dance floor area, about 50 feet (15 m) from the main stage, for FOH sound mixing duties. Burke said in an interview that with a new sound system that was "transparent at amazing levels", he intended next to focus on upgrading the lighting system.

Bimbo's has a second bar near the kitchen, with a dance floor and performance space suitable for DJs or showcasing new acts. The room holds 150–200 people. In the main performance area, there are no balconies, and 125–475 people can be accommodated in booths and at tables on the terrace and dance floor for sit-down dinner served from the venue's full kitchen, available to outside caterers. If no dinner is planned, some 700 can watch the main stage, with theater-style seating on the dance floor and standing room at the bar.

The venue's optical illusion attraction, Dolphina: The Girl in the Fishbowl, is no longer scheduled as a nightly performance, but remains available for private parties and other events.
