= Frits van Paasschen =

Frits D. van Paasschen (born 24 March 1961, The Netherlands) is the former chief executive officer of Starwood and formerly an executive with Coors Brewing Company.

== Early life and education ==
Van Paasschen was born on 24 March 1961, the son of two doctors. He attended Mercer Island High School near Seattle and holds a Bachelor of Arts Degree in Economics and Biology from Amherst College in Massachusetts and MBA from Harvard Business School.

== Career ==
Van Paasschen served as the president and chief executive officer of Starwood from September 2007 until February 2015.

He served as president and chief executive officer of Coors Brewing Company from March 29, 2005 to August 31, 2007.

Previously, he served as corporate vice president and general manager of Europe, Middle East and Africa of Nike Inc. from 2000 to 2004. van Paasschen served as vice president and general manager of Canada, Latin America and Africa of Nike Inc. from 1998 to 2000 and served as its vice president of global strategic planning from 1998.

Earlier in his career, and beginning in 1983, he served in various management positions with Boston Consulting Group, First Call Corporation, Goldman, Sachs & Co. and McKinsey & Company. He also worked briefly at Disney.

=== Corporate boards ===
- Vice president of finance & planning of Disney Consumer Products, The Walt Disney Company in 1995.
- Independent director of Oakley, Inc. from September 2005 to November 2007.
- Director of The Jones Group Inc. starting on November 30, 2006.
- Board of Starwood starting on September 24, 2007.
- Non-executive director of Barclays Bank starting on August 1, 2013.
- Director of Williams-Sonoma, 2017 to current. Member of the compensation committee and nominations, corporate governance and social responsibility committees.
- Director and board chair of Convene, 2018 to current.

== Personal life ==
Van Paasschen is married and has three children. He is a dual citizen of the Netherlands and the United States.
