= National Restaurant Association =

US trade organization

- Formation: 1919; 107 years ago
- Tax ID no.: 36-1525480
- Legal status: 501(c)(6) trade association
- Purpose: The National Restaurant Association creates value for the foodservice industry and its membership in the avenues of research, advocacy and education. We conduct research on current trends, advocate policy initiatives, and provide educational and networking opportunities for the industry.
- Headquarters: 2055 L Street NW, Washington, D.C. 20036, U.S.
- Chair: Jeff Lobdell
- President, Chief Executive Officer: Michelle Korsmo
- Subsidiaries: National Restaurant Association Solutions LLC, National Registry of Food Safety Professionals Inc, National Restaurant Association Winsight Investment LLC, Multicultural Foodservice and Hospitality Alliance _{(501(c)(3))}, National Restaurant Association Educational Foundation _{(501(c)(3))}, Restaurant Law Center _{(501(c)(6))}, Pebbles Holdco LLC, National Restaurant Association Services LLC, NRAS India Private Limited
- Affiliations: NRA Political Action Committee _{(PAC)}
- Revenue: $97,254,330 (2022)
- Expenses: $108,729,682 (2022)
- Endowment: $14,649,534 _{(2022)}
- Employees: 388 (2022)
- Volunteers: 63 (2022)
- Website: www.restaurant.org

The National Restaurant Association is a restaurant industry business association in the United States, representing more than 380,000 restaurant locations. It also operates the National Restaurant Association Educational Foundation. The association was founded in 1919 and is headquartered in Washington, D.C., with an additional office on the 36th floor of the Willis Tower in Chicago.

== Lobbying ==
The National Restaurant Association is a powerful lobbying force in Washington, D.C. and in state capitals, where it is widely referred to as "the other NRA" to distinguish itself from National Rifle Association of America, which shares the initialism. The association advocates to suppress the minimum wage in the United States as well as opposing laws requiring paid sick leave. In July 2013, it boasted that it had successfully lobbied against raises in the minimum wage, in part or in full, in 27 of 29 states and blocked paid sick leave legislation in 12 states. It also takes credit for halting any increase in the federal minimum wage for tipped employees, which has remained at $2.13 per hour since 1991. (The federal "basic combined cash & tip minimum wage rate" is $7.25 per hour).

The NRA supported the Fighting Hunger Incentive Act of 2014 (H.R. 4719; 113th Congress), a bill that would amend the Internal Revenue Code to make permanent extend and to expand certain expired provisions that provided an enhanced tax deduction for businesses that donated their food inventory to charitable organizations. The NRA argued that "the deduction for charitable donation of food inventory is a critical tool in alleviating hunger" because it "encourages donating the food to charity, by helping to offset the costs associated with preserving, storing and transporting the extra food."

The NRA opposed the National Labor Relations Board's joint employer standard, but was unable to affect a change in legislation repealing the standard.

== Other programs ==
The National Restaurant Association develops food safety training and certification program for restaurant employees. ServSafe, administered by the National Restaurant Association, and accredited by ANSI, provides training on foodborne illnesses and food allergens.

It also offers scholarships to foodservice and hospitality management and culinary students through NRAEF. It also created and runs ProStart, a national culinary and restaurant management program for high school students . The NRA also presents a series of awards, including the Faces of Diversity, the American Dream Awards, and the Restaurant Neighbor Award.

It runs an annual restaurant and hospitality industry trade show in the US, in Chicago, and conducts research about the country's restaurant industry. For instance, it states that the restaurant industry in the US in 2021 employs 14.5 million Americans (up from 12.5 million in 2012), with sales in 2021 at $799 billion (up from $632 billion in 2012).

The National Restaurant Association also helps restaurant owners increase their environmental sustainability efforts.

The National Restaurant Association teamed up with Healthy Dining to launch Kids LiveWell, a program that helps restaurants increase healthful options on kids' menus and makes it easy for parents to find those options when dining out.

The association works closely with its state restaurant and hospitality association partners and provides its members with tools and solutions to improve their business. It also organizes conferences and networking events for its members. There are six membership categories: Restaurant, Allied, Faculty, Student, Nonprofit, and International.

The association lobbies for the restaurant and foodservice industry and represents the industry on Capitol Hill. It was the largest food and beverage political action committee contributor to both the U.S. Democratic and Republican Parties in the 2004 election cycle.

The association is actively opposing the lowering of the federal blood alcohol content limit from 0.08% to 0.05%

In May 2010 the Healthy Weight Commitment Foundation with 16 major food companies, including Mars Inc., Coca-Cola, and General Mills, with the aim of removing 1.5 trillion calories from consumers and the food chain. The goal was surpassed with 6.4 trillion calories removed instead (four times the amount).

== Notable people ==
- Biff Naylor, past president
- Dawn Sweeney, president and chief executive officer, 2007–2019
- Doron Jensen, past president of the Minnesota Restaurant Association, 2000–2001
- Herman Cain, president, 1996–1999
- Marvin Irby, interim CEO, 2020–present
- Ransom M. Callicott, association president, 1949
- Richard Brennan, Sr., board member, affiliated with Brennan Family Restaurants, based in New Orleans
- Victor Rosellini (1915–2003), past president

== See also ==
- National Registry of Food Safety Professionals
