= Independent Restaurant Coalition =

Trade organization in the US

- Formation: 2020; 6 years ago
- Founder: Independent restaurateurs and chefs
- Type: Trade group
- Purpose: Lobbying local, state and federal governments on behalf of independent restaurants
- Location: United States
- Website: https://www.independentrestaurantcoalition.com/

The Independent Restaurant Coalition is a US trade group formed during the COVID-19 pandemic by independent restaurateurs and chefs. During the pandemic the group lobbied local, state and federal governments for relief after their businesses were closed by government mandates to slow the spread of the virus. Their aim was to mitigate the impact of the closings on independent restaurants. Multiple prominent chefs and restaurateurs formed the leadership team.

== Background ==
According to the IRC, independent restaurants represented 4% of the US GDP and employed 11 million workers at the beginning of 2020. The US has 500,000 independently operated restaurants.

== History ==
The coalition got its start on March 18, 2020 when 18 chefs, restaurateurs were invited to a conference call by Andrew Chason of Creative Arts Agency. The group quickly determined that the response from the White House was not sufficient to support independent restaurants and bars and the incumbent trade association was not doing enough to support these businesses. Within a matter of days, the call became an organization and enlisted the support of lobbyists and communication strategists.

The Founding Members of the Coalition are Sam Kass, Tom Collichio, Erika Polmar, Andrew Carmellini, Ashley Christensen, Sean Brock, Kwamwe Onwuachi, Camilla Marcus, Amanda Cohen, Kevin Boehm, Donnie Madia, Naomi Pomeroy, Andrew Zimmern. The Founders group expanded to include Caroline Styne, Katie Button, Michael Shemtov, and Gregory Gourdet. The Coalition engaged Angela Kouters to lead the Coalition, she served in the role for three months. The IRC then asked co-founder Erika Polmar to step into the role.

== Mission ==
The initial goal was to secure financial and legislative protections for restaurants and their workers. After the federal government passed the CARES Act the group said the bill's primary provision, the Paycheck Protection Program, did not help independent restaurateurs. At the end of April the group called for a $120 billion fund for small and independent restaurateurs, asking congress to exclude publicly traded restaurants and large restaurant chains from accessing the fund.
