= Life After Top Chef =

American reality television series

- Top Chef alumni featured on the show
- Genre: Reality
- Starring: Richard Blais; Fabio Viviani; Spike Mendelsohn; Jennifer Carroll
- Country of origin: United States
- Original language: English
- No. of seasons: 1
- No. of episodes: 8

Production
- Executive producers: Dan Cutforth; Jane Lipsitz; Nan Strait; Casey Criley
- Running time: 45 minutes
- Production company: Magical Elves Productions

Original release
- Network: Bravo
- Release: October 3 – November 28, 2012

Life After Top Chef is an American reality television series that aired on the Bravo television network. It premiered on October 3, 2012.

== Premise ==
The series follows former Top Chef contestants Richard Blais (Top Chef: Chicago, Top Chef: All-Stars), Jen Carroll (Top Chef: Las Vegas, Top Chef: All-Stars), Spike Mendelsohn (Top Chef: Chicago, Top Chef: All-Stars), and Fabio Viviani (Top Chef: New York, Top Chef: All-Stars) as they pursue their post-Top Chef professional endeavors and provides insight into the chefs' private lives.

== Cast ==
- Richard Blais — Top Chef: Chicago (runner-up), Top Chef: All-Stars (winner). Resides in: Atlanta, Georgia.
- Jennifer Carroll — Top Chef: Las Vegas (4th), Top Chef: All-Stars (17th). Resides in: Philadelphia, Pennsylvania.
- Evangelos "Spike" Mendelsohn — Top Chef: Chicago (5th), Top Chef: All-Stars (14th). Resides in: Washington, D.C.
- Fabio Viviani — Top Chef: New York (4th), Top Chef: All-Stars (8th). Resides in: Los Angeles, California.

== Episodes ==
No.	Title	Original release date
1	"Cook Your Aspen Off"	October 3, 2012
2	"No Food Deed Goes Unpunished"	October 10, 2012
3	"Duck Hearts and French Baguettes"	October 17, 2012
4	"Shear Today, Gone to Marrow"	October 24, 2012
5	"Good Shuck With That"	November 7, 2012
6	"Mt. Viviani Erupts"	November 14, 2012
7	"Let's Do Launch"	November 21, 2012
8	"First Lady's Choice"	November 28, 2012
Note: Michelle Obama guest stars in this episode.
