= Jamie Lauren =

American chef

- Education: The Culinary Institute of America
- Culinary career
- Television show(s): Top Chef The Taste MasterChef 24 Hours To Hell and Back Man vs. Child: Chef Showdown Pressure Cooker

Jamie Lauren is an American celebrity chef known for her appearance in two seasons of Bravo's Top Chef reality show. Lauren is also noted as one of the show's lesbian chefs.

== Biography ==
Lauren studied at journalism the University of Massachusetts. While pursuing her degree, she worked as a prep cook and was later promoted to a line cook position. She decided to study cooking and transferred to The Culinary Institute of America, where she was an honors graduate. After school, she went to France and worked in Chambéry to refine her cooking skills. In 2001, she moved to San Francisco and started to attract attention as the executive chef of Levende Lounge. She then transferred to Absinthe as its Executive Chef, a position she held until 2010. During this period, she was considered as one of the high-profile female chefs in the area, along with Judy Rodgers, Traci Des Jardins, and Elizabeth Falkner. In 2005, Lauren was chosen as one of San Francisco Chronicle's "Rising Star Chefs".

=== Top Chef ===
According to Lauren, she was asked to audition for Top Chef season 1 but only got a call back to participate in the show's fifth season, which aired in 2009. She was part of Team Rainbow alongside Patrick Dunlea and Richard Sweeney. During the season, she was considered one of the early favorites but was sent home during the 11th episode. Lauren again took part in the reality show, appearing in the Top Chef All Stars, where she was eliminated in the sixth episode. Some of her fellow contestants were critical of her alleged lack of cooking skills. In later interviews, Lauren defended herself claiming she got a "bad edit".

Lauren also appeared in other shows such as The Taste, MasterChef, 24 Hours To Hell and Back, and Man vs. Child: Chef Showdown. She also became a judge on the cooking competition Pressure Cooker.
