= Fabio Viviani =

Fabio Viviani may refer to:

- Fabio Viviani (chef) (born 1978), Italian chef who competed in the TV show Top Chef
- Fabio Viviani (footballer) (born 1966), Italian football player and coach
