= Pressure cooker (disambiguation) =

A pressure cooker is a sealed vessel for cooking food under steam pressure.

Pressure cooker may also refer to:

== Cooking ==
- Pressure fryer
- Steam digester

== Art, entertainment, and media ==
- Pressure Cooker (band), a U.S. reggae band from Boston
- The Pressure Cooker, a 2008 Irish documentary
- Pressure Cooker (2008 film), an American documentary film
- Pressure Cooker (2020 film), an Indian comedy film
- Pressure Cooker (2026 film), a Bangladeshi crime thriller film
- Pressure Cooker (video game), a 1983 game for the Atari 2600
- Riddim Driven: Pressure Cooker, a 2001 compilation album produced by VP Records
- Pressure Cooker (album), an album by Junior Cook
- Pressure Cooker (TV series), a 2023 reality show produced by Netflix

== See also ==
- Pressure cooker bomb, a type of home-made bomb similar to a pipe bomb
- Pressure Cookin', a 1973 album by American singing trio Labelle
