= Fatty Crew =

Restaurant information
- Established: 2005
- Owners: Rick Camac, Zakary Pelaccio
- Chef: Zakary Pelaccio, Leah Cohen
- Food type: Malaysian, Southeast Asian, Fusion
- Location: New York City, New York, United States
- Website: www.fattycrew.com

Fatty Crew, or Fatty Crew Hospitality Group, is a restaurant group based in New York City. Member restaurants include Fatty Crab, Fatty 'Cue, and Pig and Khao. It is founded by Rick Camac and Zakary Pelaccio.

== History ==
Pelaccio's first restaurant, the Chickenbone Cafe, was relatively short-lived, opening and closing in 2003. Following that, he performed a short stint in 5 Ninth, but eventually left and founded Fatty Crew with Rick Camac. Their flagship restaurant, Fatty Crab, opened in 2005. As of 2017, every project managed or owned by Fatty Crew has closed.

With a restaurant that has been "full nearly since the minute it opened," Pelaccio and Camac set out to expand their group into different cuisine styles, opening two Fatty 'Cue restaurants in West Village and Brooklyn.

Recently, Fatty Crew partnered with Top Chef: New York contestant Leah Cohen to open up Pig and Khao, and Fatty Crab opened a new location in Hong Kong. Fatty Crew also explored several other side projects, including a partnership with Kardashian member Scott Disick in Ryu, a restaurant in the meatpacking district.

As of 2017, all of the Fatty Crew restaurants have closed, and the management deal with Leah Cohen is over after a heated legal dispute.

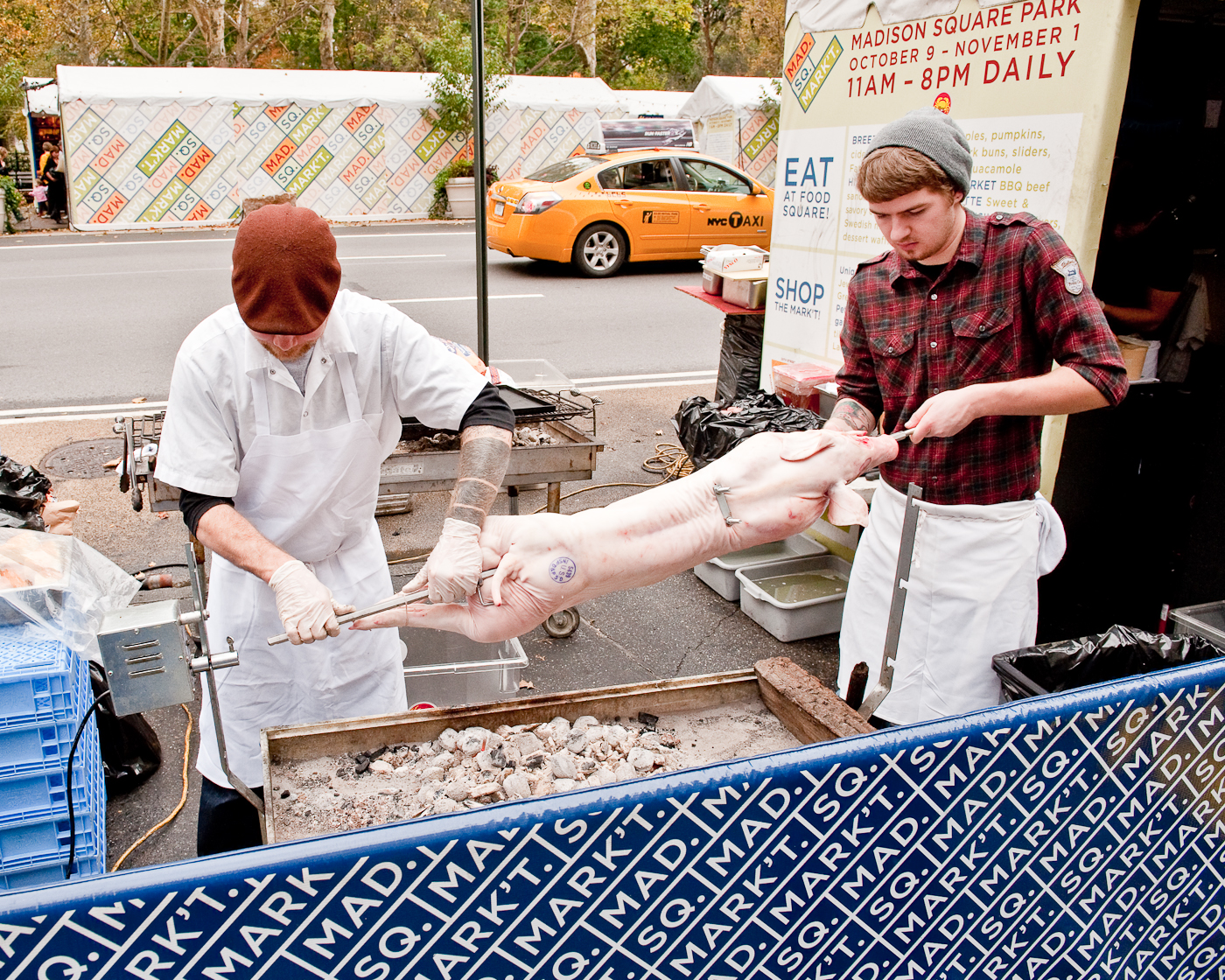
Fatty Crab-Cabrito Kiosk at Manhattan's Madison Square Market, New York, NY

== Critical reception ==
Fatty Crew's restaurants received immediate critical acclaim following their launches. with Fatty Crab, Fatty 'Cue, and Pig and Khao all receiving two stars from the New York Times.

Zagat listed Fatty 'Cue as one of the top 6 barbecue restaurants in New York City. Likewise, Village Voice named Fatty 'Cue as one of the 10 best barbecue restaurants in NYC. New York Magazine also awarded Fatty 'Cue for serving the Best Sandwich in New York.
