= Spike Mendelsohn =

Canadian chef

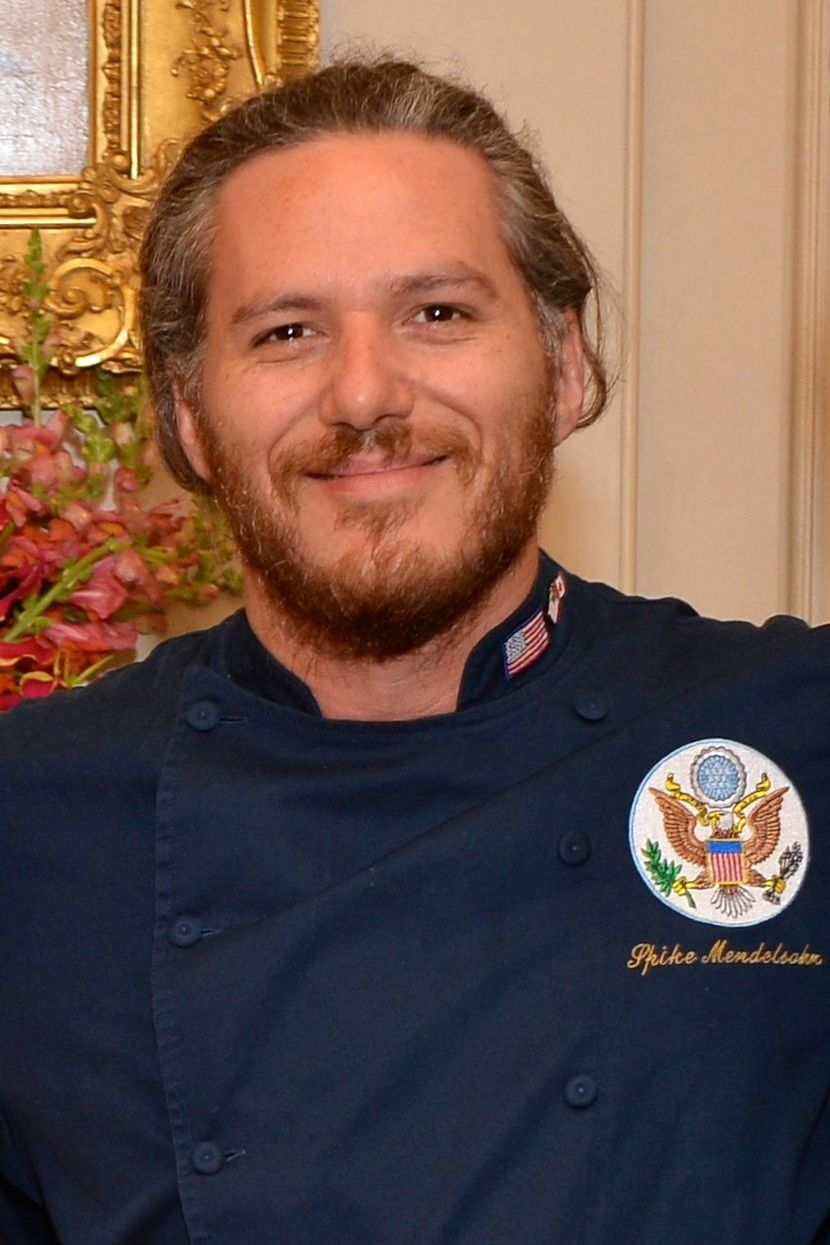
- Mendelsohn in 2016
- Born: Evangelos Spiros Mendelsohn; Montreal, Quebec, Canada
- Education: Culinary Institute of America
- Culinary career
- Current restaurants: Good Stuff Eatery (Capitol Hill & Georgetown, Washington, D.C.; Arlington & Reagan National Airport, VA; Chicago, IL; Riyadh, Saudi Arabia); We, The Pizza (Capitol Hill & Arlington, VA); Béarnaise (Washington, D.C., closed 2017); Sheppard (Washington, D.C., with Mixologist David Strauss); Morris American Bar (Washington, D.C., with Mixologist David Strauss); Sunny's (Miami, FL); Campton Yard (Miami, FL); Santa Rosa Taqueria (Washington, D.C.)
- Previous restaurants: Mai house; Le Cirque; Bouchon; Les Crayeres; Pepin restaurant
- Television shows: Bar Rescue; Kitchen Sink; Iron Chef America; Life After Top Chef; The Next Iron Chef; Top Chef
- Awards won: The Francis Roth Leadership Award; Burger Bash 2009
- Website: www.chefspike.com

Evangelos Spiros "Spike" Mendelsohn (born 15 December 1980) is a Washington, D.C.–based chef and restaurateur best known as the fifth-place finisher of the fourth season of Top Chef, which aired 2008–2009. He is the chef and owner of multiple restaurants: Good Stuff Eatery, Santa Rosa Taqueria, and We, The Pizza in Washington, D.C. In the summer of 2017, Mendelsohn closed his restaurant Béarnaise in Washington's Capitol Hill and opened Santa Rosa Taqueria in its place. In 2019, Mendelsohn opened PLNT Burger, a vegan restaurant featuring Beyond Meat, inside Whole Foods Market in Silver Spring, Maryland.

== Early life and education ==
Mendelsohn was born in Montreal, Quebec, Canada. His mother is Greek and his father is Jewish. In 1993, when Mendelsohn was thirteen years old, his family moved to Seville, Spain. The family lived there for three and a half years, during which time he attended school in Marbella, Spain. Later, the family moved to Clearwater Beach, Florida. They operated a restaurant in St. Petersburg, Florida until its sale in 2004. Mendelsohn worked in the restaurant in various positions.

In 2005, Mendelsohn graduated from the Culinary Institute of America. While studying at the institute, Mendelsohn began his friendship with American Chef Marcel Vigneron. Mendelsohn has since worked for culinary chefs such as Gerard Boyer in Reims, France; Thomas Keller of The French Laundry and Bouchon in Napa Valley, California; Sirio Maccioni of Le Cirque; and Drew Neiporent's Mai House in New York City. Mendelsohn notes in an interview that "my family has been in the [restaurant] business for centuries—my father, grandfather, and great-grandfather." In 2008, Mendelsohn's family formed the Washington, D.C.–based Sunnyside Restaurant Group consisting of the restaurants "Good Stuff Eatery," "We, The Pizza," and "Santa Rosa Taqueria."

== Media appearances ==
Mendelsohn made his television debut on Bravo TV’s television series Top Chef: Chicago. He was also featured on other television shows, such as Bravo TV’s Life After Top Chef (aired in the fall of 2012) and Top Chef: All Stars (aired in December 2010), Food Network’s Iron Chef America and Spike TV’s Bar Rescue.

In 2010, Mendelsohn was featured in Cosmopolitan Magazine giving his five dating tips.

During the summer of 2011, the CBS' The Early Show featured him as a regular guest correspondent. He was selected as one of the chefs to compete in Food Network’s Next Iron Chef: Super Chefs in the fall of 2011 and asked back to compete in Food Network’s Next Iron Chef: Redemption season that aired in November 2012. He also appeared on shows such as Good Morning America, The View, Rachael Ray, and VH1's Big Morning Buzz Live.

In February 2014, Mendelsohn appeared on The Queen Latifah Show.

== Prez Obama Burger ==
In 2009, Mendelsohn created his "Prez Obama Burger" in honor of President Barack Obama's 2009 inaugural celebration.

In March 2011, President Obama took five members of his staff out to visit and lunch at Mendelsohn's restaurant "Good Stuff Eatery." The group included Office of Management and Budget Director Jack Lew, White House Director of Legislative Affairs Rob Nabors, Deputy Chief of Staff for Policy Nancy DeParle, Vice President Biden's Chief of Staff Bruce Reed, and Gene Sperling, director of the United States National Economic Council.

Following the Prez Obama Burger, Mendelsohn added the "Michelle Melt" to the Good Stuff Eatery menu in collaboration with White House chef Sam Kass to honor the First Lady's frequent visits to the restaurant.

== Activism ==
Mendelsohn has served as chair of the Washington, D.C., "D.C. Food Policy Council" since his appointment by mayor Muriel Bowser in February 2015. In addition to working with the nonprofit DC Central Kitchen, Mendelsohn has served as a Chef Ambassador for the CARE International Chefs' Table Program.

== Publications ==
In 2010, Mendelsohn published a cookbook named The Good Stuff Cookbook with his sister Micheline Mendelsohn.

== Personal life ==
In March 2011, Mendelsohn and the Sixth & I Historic Synagogue began a lunchtime kosher food truck project, an idea inspired by the dearth of kosher delis in Washington. Mendelsohn and his associates featured traditional Jewish staples, like corned beef sandwiches and knishes.

In February 2013, Mendelsohn hosted a celebrity chef beach volleyball tournament at the Food Network South Beach Wine and Food Festival, an annual wine and spirits event showcasing many of the world's top chefs, spirits producers, and culinary personalities. The event is hosted by Florida International University's (FIU) School of Hospitality and Tourism Management.

In 2013, Mendelsohn supported Michelle Obama's Let's Move! initiative by featuring a White House Easter Egg Roll.

In 2019, Mendelsohn opened PLNT Burger, a vegan restaurant featuring Beyond Meat, inside Whole Foods Market in Silver Spring, Maryland. In November 2020, PLNT Burger announced major brick-and-mortar expansion plans for 2021.
