= Man vs. Child: Chef Showdown =

American cooking competition television series

- Genre: Cooking reality competition
- Country of origin: United States
- Original language: English
- No. of seasons: 2
- No. of episodes: 31

Original release
- Network: FYI
- Release: July 23, 2015

Man vs. Child: Chef Showdown is an American cooking reality competition shown on FYI.

The show features top-level executive chefs pitted against young cooking prodigies. The show premiered on July 23, 2015 for its first season of 13 episodes. The second season premiered on March 17, 2016.

== Format ==
This reality show has a group of young kid chefs and an executive level chef who are pitted against each other in three rounds of themed competition.

The competitors' overall aptitude and areas of expertise are tested in three dynamic cooking rounds as they are challenged to create a different dish, under unusual circumstances. In the first two rounds, a panel of judges tastes the dishes and determine which chef had created the most delicious and inspired plate. The third and final round is a blind taste test which is judged by a critically acclaimed master-level chef. The overall winner takes home the ultimate prize of bragging.

== Season 1 ==
Each week a team of five child cooking prodigies -Cloyce (13), Holden (14), Emmalee (12), Dylan (11), and Estie (7) challenge a prolific executive-level chef in the kitchen, where they defend their culinary abilities.

== Season 2 ==
The second season consists of 18 episodes. The child prodigies were joined by newcomers Isiah (10), Olivia (11) and Zion (10). Dylan did not return this season. Adam Gertler, returns as host and Mike Isabella and Alia Zaine return as reoccurring judges and commentators.

Season 2 featured:

1. Emmalee Rainbow – Chef, Team Prodigy
2. Holden Dahlerbruch – Chef, Team Prodigy
3. Olivia Esparra – Chef, Team Prodigy
4. Isiah Greene – Chef, Team Prodigy
5. Estie Kung – Chef, Team Prodigy
6. Cloyce Martin – Chef, Team Prodigy
7. Zion Otano – Chef, Team Prodigy
8. Adam Gertler – Host
9. Mike Isabella – Judge
10. Alia Zaine – Judge
