= Zak Pelaccio =

- Education: French Culinary Institute
- Occupation: Chef
- Known for: Fatty Crab
- Website: www.zakarypelaccio.com

Zak Pelaccio is an American chef known for Southeast Asian cuisine.

== Early life and education ==
Pelaccio was born to Italian parents and grew up in Westchester County. He trained at the French Culinary Institute.

== Career ==
Pelaccio opened the Fatty Crab on Hudson Street in New York City in 2005 This followed by 17 iterations of the restaurant including Fatty Cue, Fatty Johnson and a spinoff in Hong Kong years following. He is also the author of Eat With Your Hands, a cookbook he released in 2012.

In 2013, Pelaccio moved to Upstate New York and opened the restaurant Fish & Game in Hudson, New York. In 2016, he opened Bakar at BackBarwith with Fish & Game co-chef Kevin Pomplun.
