= We, the Pizza =

American restaurant chain

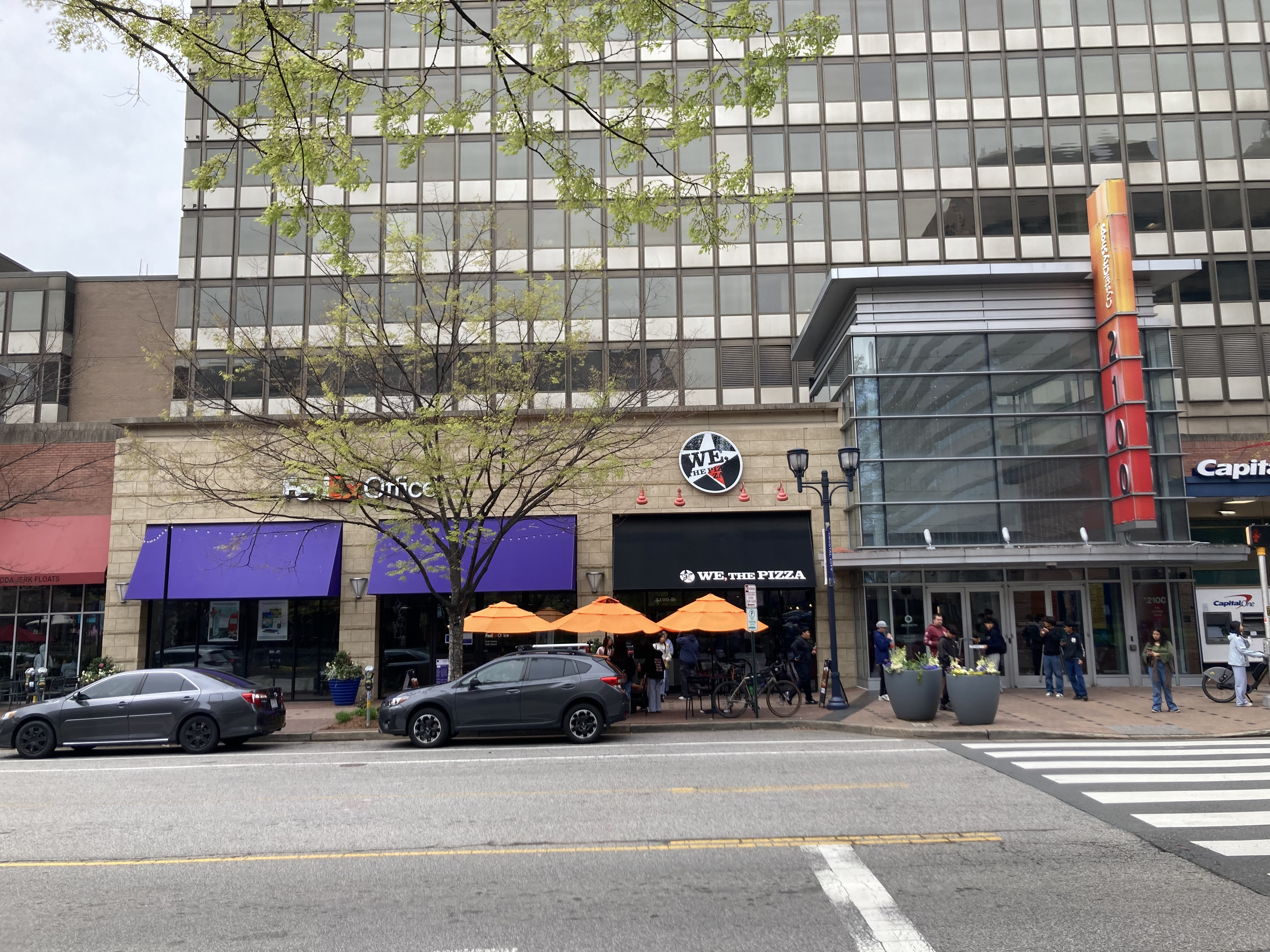
- A location in Arlington County, Virginia
- Type: Private
- Industry: Foodservice
- Founded: 2010
- Founder: Spike Mendelsohn
- Number of locations: 5 (2024)
- Area served: Florida; Virginia; Washington, D.C., U.S.
- Key people: Harvey Mendelsohn (CEO); Catherine Mendelsohn (COO)
- Owner: Sunnyside Restaurant Group
- Website: wethepizza.com

We, the Pizza is an American chain of pizzerias primarily based in Washington, D.C. and Arlington County, Virginia. It was founded in 2010 and is owned by Sunnyside Restaurant Group.

== History ==
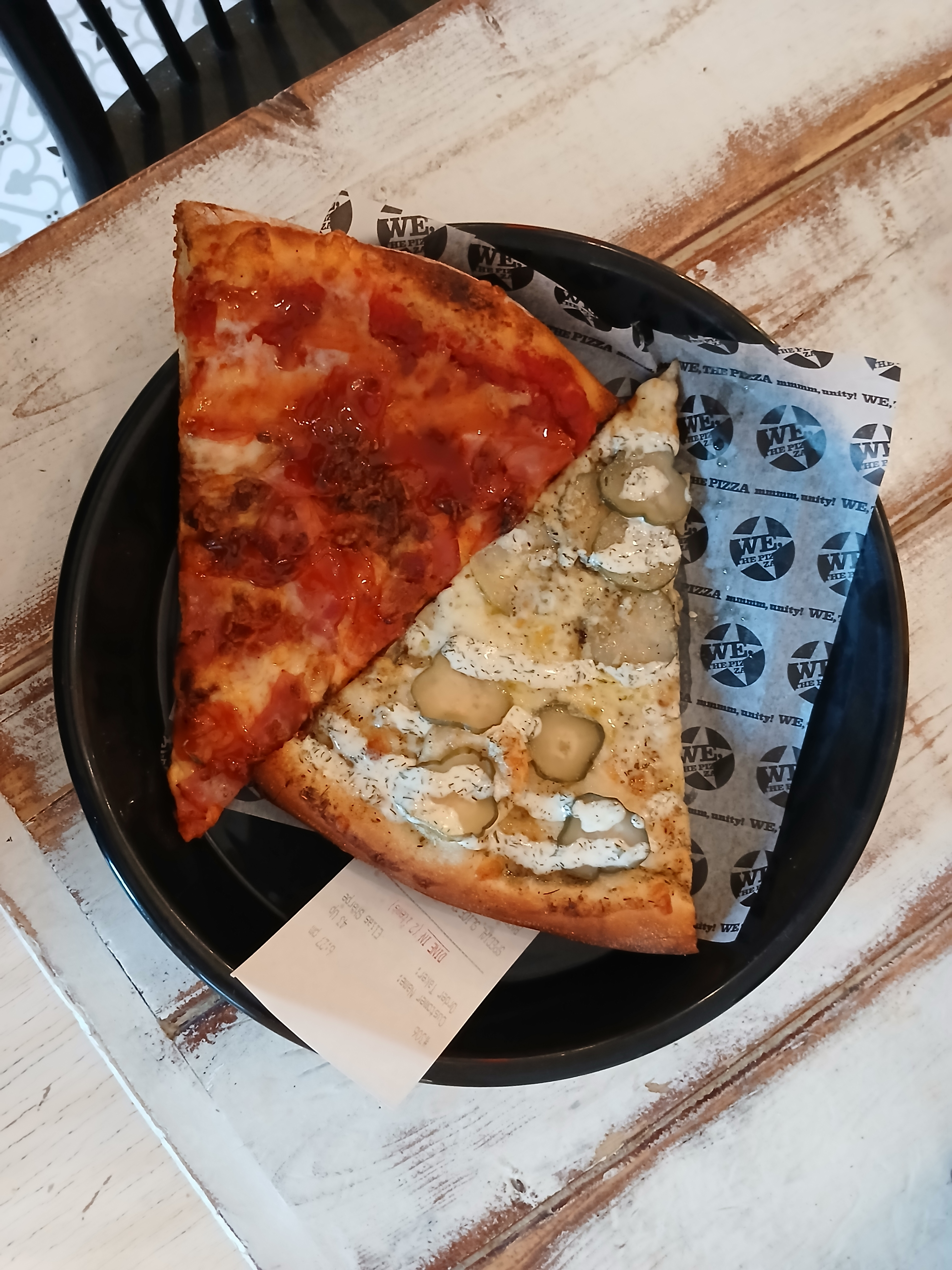
Two slices from the Capitol Hill location.

The first restaurant was opened on July 12, 2010, by Spike Mendelsohn. It was located on Capitol Hill, Washington, D.C., next to another Mendelsohn restaurant, Good Stuff Eatery. The Greek taverna that was previously located in the space wanted to leave, and Mendelsohn wanted both of his restaurants to be located next to each other. He did not have an idea for what sort of restaurant he wanted to open when he signed the lease; eventually he settled on a pizzeria. Completing the process took a while, and Mendelsohn was paying rent on the location for around a year before it officially opened. After it opened, Barack and Michelle Obama frequented the restaurant. Mendelsohn's family also had formed Sunnyside Restaurant Group, which operates the chain and five other franchises internationally.

Its second location was opened in June 2014, in Crystal City, Virginia. The Ballston, Arlington, restaurant opened in October 2019. In 2021, We, the Pizza partnered with Michael Waltz and Vicky Hartzler to donate pizzas to the National Guard in appreciation of their services.

== Menu ==
The chain has 17 custom pre-made pizza designs. They also offer cinnamon and garlic knots, buffalo wings, and salads.

== Locations ==
We, the Pizza has five locations. Four are in the Washington metropolitan area, including two in Arlington County, Virginia, with one in Ballston and one in Crystal City, and two in Washington, D.C., on Capitol Hill and U Street. The fifth restaurant is in Clearwater, Florida.
