= Ron Duprat =

American celebrity chef, television star and author

- Born: August 22, 1972 (age 54); Haiti
- Citizenship: American
- Education: La Varenne Ecole Decuisine
- Occupations: Chef, television host, author, keynote speaker
- Website: ronduprat.com

Ron Duprat (born August 22, 1972) is a Haitian-born American celebrity chef, television host, author, and keynote speaker.

== Career ==
Duprat started his career as a dishwasher and first came to the United States when he was 16-year-old via boat from Haiti to Florida in a 27 days journey. Duprat pursued his education in Paris, France, at La Varenne Ecole Decuisine and in the United States at the Culinary Institute of America. His specialty is combining rich Caribbean heritage flavors with French accents. Duprat wrote his own book called My Journey of Cooking and was appointed as a culinary ambassador by the State Department.

Duprat appeared on multiple culinary related shows and is best known as one of the top competitors on Bravo TV's Top Chef: Season Six, set in Las Vegas. He also appeared on Iron Chef America, Bar Rescue, and Beat Bobby Flay on Food Network.

In 2010, Oprah magazine named "Butternut Squash and Sweet Potato Bisque" as Oprah's favorite recipe by Chef Duprat.

He is affiliated with several causes, including the First Lady Michelle Obama's 'Let's Move' campaign, No Hungry Kids, and the Black Culinarian Alliance (BCA). He has been a member of the U.S. State Department's Chef Corps, and a Goodwill Ambassador of the Food and Agriculture Organization.
