= Preeti Mistry =

English-born American chef

- Born: London, England
- Culinary career
- Previous restaurant(s): Juhu Beach Club, Oakland, California (2012–2017)

Preeti Mistry is a London-born Californian chef. They were a former contestant on Top Chef: Las Vegas (2009) and a James Beard Foundation nominee twice for “Best Chef of the West” in 2017 and 2018. Mistry was the owner of the former Juhu Beach Club (2012–2017), in the Temescal neighborhood of Oakland, California.

Mistry graduated from Le Cordon Bleu, and early in their career they worked at Peter Gordon’s Sugar Club in London. They are queer and nonbinary, using the pronouns they/them.

In 2021, Mistry launched a podcast, Loading Dock Talks with Preeti Mistry. In 2025, they won a James Beard Award for their podcast episode "Cream Pie with Telly Justice" in the Audio Programming category.
