= Kevin Gillespie (chef) =

American chef (born 1982)

- Born: September 30, 1982 (age 44); Atlanta, Georgia, U.S.
- Education: Art Institute of Atlanta
- Culinary career
- Current restaurants
- Gunshow (Atlanta); Kevin Gillespie's Gamechanger (Atlanta); Nadair (Atlanta)
- Previous restaurants
- Revival (Decatur, Georgia, 2015-2023)
- Television shows
- Top Chef: Las Vegas; Top Chef Duels; Top Chef: All-Stars L.A.

Kevin Gillespie (born September 30, 1982) is an American chef, restaurateur, author and former Top Chef contestant. He is a multiple time finalist for the James Beard Award. Gillespie's Red Beard Restaurants Group operates his restaurants in the greater Atlanta area, including Gunshow, which Gillespie opened in 2013, and Nadair, opened in 2024. He resides in Georgia.

== Top Chef ==
Gillespie was a finalist in the sixth season of Top Chef, Bravo's cooking competition show and was voted as the "Fan Favorite" contestant for the season. As a prize for winning one of the Top Chef episodes, Gillespie was invited to compete in the Bocuse d'Or USA cooking competition, for the opportunity to be the U.S. representative in the 2011 international Bocuse d'Or, but later withdrew due to not having enough time to prepare. Gillespie returned to television to compete on Bravo's Top Chef Duels, advancing to the high-stakes finale.

In a 2012 interview, chef Wolfgang Puck stated that Gillespie is his favorite Top Chef alumnus.

Gillespie also competed in the 2020 All Stars LA season of Top Chef. He was eliminated in the Restaurant Wars episode after serving as team captain for the losing team. Gillespie took responsibility for the loss and accepted elimination.

Following his elimination, Gillespie fought to return to the competition via Last Chance Kitchen. Gillespie returned to the Top Chef All Stars LA competition in episode 11 having won Last Chance Kitchen.

== Restaurants ==
He is a former co-owner and executive chef at Woodfire Grill in Atlanta. He opened Gunshow, a restaurant in Atlanta, in 2013 and Revival, a restaurant in Decatur, Georgia, in 2015. Gillespie also started Red Beard Restaurants, allowing Gillespie to expand and provide consulting services to other start-ups. Kevin Gillespie's Gamechanger opened in August 2017 on the 200 concourse western end zone of the Mercedes-Benz Stadium. Gillespie closed Revival in February 2023 after damage caused by a burglary and storm earlier in the year. In May 2024, Gillespie opened Nadair (translated as "the way of nature" in Gaelic) in Atlanta, a restaurant showcasing his Scottish heritage.

== Awards ==
On November 6, 2014, Gillespie was awarded the GRACE Innovator Award by the Georgia Restaurant Association. Gillespie was nominated for Food & Wine's People's Best New Chef and named Forbes' 30 Under 30. In 2014, Gunshow earned a spot on GQ magazine's list of "12 Most Outstanding Restaurants" as well as Esquire magazine's list of "Best New Restaurants of 2014." Eater included Gunshow in its annual "The National 38" list of places to eat in America in 2015 and 2016.

Gillespie reached the semi-final stage of the James Beard Rising Star Chef of the Year awards four consecutive years in a row. In 2013, Gillespie was named a James Beard Foundation Award Finalist in the Cookbook: American Cooking category for his debut cookbook, Fire in my Belly. His 2015 follow-up, "Pure Pork Awesomeness," was devoted to Gillespie's preferred protein. Gillespie was named a semifinalist for the James Beard Award Best Chef: Southeast in 2015, finalist in 2016 and a semifinalist in 2017.

In 2022, Gillespie was named a James Beard Award finalist in the Outstanding Restaurateur category.

== Personal ==
Gillespie grew up in Georgia and attended Henry County High School, interested in becoming a nuclear engineer. In 1997–1998 he was accepted to Massachusetts Institute of Technology with a full scholarship, but he decided to attend the Art Institute of Atlanta after high school instead to study cooking.

Gillespie married Valerie Combs on September 4, 2011.

In May 2018, Gillespie was diagnosed with a rare form of renal cancer. This was discovered after an unrelated back surgery follow-up in 2017, at which time the MRI displayed an abnormal kidney. On May 24, 2018, one of his kidneys was removed.

== In other media ==
- Gillespie voiced himself in the season six episode "Asbestos I Can" on the animated series Squidbillies.
- Gillespie also voiced a truck driver in the animated series Archer.
- In 2012, Gillespie voiced Crimson Tightwad in the Cartoon Network syndicated series/Adult Swim original Aqua Teen Hunger Force.
- In June 2021, Gillespie joined the MeatEater hunting podcast and media group as a Culinary Contributor
