= Top Chef: Las Vegas =

Season 6 of American television series

- Season 6
- Hosted by: Padma Lakshmi
- Judges: Tom Colicchio; Gail Simmons; Toby Young
- No. of contestants: 17
- Winner: Michael Voltaggio
- Runners-up: Bryan Voltaggio; Kevin Gillespie
- Location: Las Vegas, Nevada
- Finals venue: Napa, California
- Fan Favorite: Kevin Gillespie
- No. of episodes: 16

Release
- Original network: Bravo
- Original release: August 19 – December 16, 2009

Season chronology
- ← Previous; New York Next → D.C.

Top Chef: Las Vegas is the sixth season of the American reality television series Top Chef. It was first filmed in Las Vegas, Nevada, before concluding in Napa, California. The season premiered on August 19, 2009, and ended on December 16, 2009. Beginning with this season, the prize money awarded to the winner was increased from US$100,000 to $125,000. In the season finale, Michael Voltaggio was declared the winner over runners-up Bryan Voltaggio and Kevin Gillespie. Gillespie was voted Fan Favorite. In 2010, Top Chef: Las Vegas received the Primetime Emmy Award for "Outstanding Reality Competition Program".

== Contestants ==
Seventeen chefs competed in Top Chef: Las Vegas.

Name	Hometown	Current Residence (Note: The contestants' city and state of residence during time of filming.)	Age
Eve Aronoff	Ann Arbor, Michigan		40
Jennifer Carroll	Philadelphia, Pennsylvania		33
Ron Duprat	Mare Rouge, Haiti	Naples, Florida	40
Ash Fulk	Pleasant Hill, California	New York City, New York	29
Kevin Gillespie	Atlanta, Georgia		26
Mike Isabella	Little Ferry, New Jersey	Washington, D.C.	34
Eli Kirshtein	Atlanta, Georgia		25
Robin Leventhal	Sun Valley, Idaho	Seattle, Washington	43
Ashley Merriman	Center Sandwich, New Hampshire	Seattle, Washington	32
Preeti Mistry	San Francisco, California		33
Mattin Noblia	Biarritz, France	San Francisco, California	29
Jesse Sandlin	Baltimore, Maryland		30
Hector Santiago	San Juan, Puerto Rico	Atlanta, Georgia	41
Bryan Voltaggio	Frederick, Maryland	Urbana, Maryland	33
Michael Voltaggio	Frederick, Maryland	Pasadena, California	30
Laurine Wickett	Rochester, New York	San Francisco, California	38
Jen Zavala	Cromwell, Connecticut	Philadelphia, Pennsylvania	31

Jennifer Carroll and Mike Isabella returned to compete in Top Chef: All-Stars. Bryan Voltaggio competed in the fifth season of Top Chef Masters. Carroll, Isabella, and Kevin Gillespie later competed in Top Chef Duels. Carroll returned again for Top Chef: Colorado, competing in the Last Chance Kitchen. Carroll, Gillespie, and Bryan Voltaggio returned for Top Chef: All-Stars L.A.

== Contestant progress ==
Episode #		1	2	3	4	5	6	7	8	9	10	12	13	14	15
Quickfire Challenge Winner(s)		Robin; Jennifer^{1}	Michael	Jennifer	Kevin^{2}	Mike^{1}	Robin	Kevin^{4}	Eli^{1}	Jennifer^{1} Kevin^{1} Laurine^{1} Mike^{1}	Kevin^{1}	Eli^{1}	Jennifer^{1}	Michael^{1}	N/A
Contestant		Elimination Challenge Results													
1	Michael	IN	HIGH	WIN	HIGH	HIGH	HIGH	LOW	HIGH	WIN	HIGH	WIN	IN	IN	WINNER
2	Bryan	IN	WIN	IN	WIN	WIN	IN	HIGH	HIGH	HIGH	IN	HIGH	IN	WIN	RUNNER-UP
2	Kevin	WIN	IN	HIGH	IN^{2}	IN	WIN	HIGH	WIN	LOW	WIN	HIGH	WIN	IN	RUNNER-UP
4	Jennifer	HIGH	IN	IN	HIGH	IN	HIGH	WIN	HIGH	LOW	LOW	LOW	IN	OUT	
5	Eli	IN	HIGH	HIGH	IN	IN	IN	LOW	IN	HIGH	HIGH	LOW	OUT		
6	Robin	IN	IN	IN	IN	LOW	IN	IN	LOW	HIGH	LOW	OUT			
7	Mike	HIGH	IN	LOW	HIGH	IN	IN	IN	IN	LOW	OUT				
8	Laurine	IN	IN	LOW	IN	HIGH	LOW	HIGH	LOW	OUT					
9	Ash	IN	IN	IN	LOW	IN	LOW	LOW	OUT						
10	Ashley	IN	LOW	IN	LOW	HIGH	HIGH	OUT							
11	Ron	HIGH	IN	IN	IN	LOW	OUT								
12	Mattin	IN	IN	IN	LOW	OUT									
13	Hector	LOW	HIGH	IN	OUT										
14	Jesse	LOW	LOW	IN	OUT^{3}										
15	Preeti	IN	LOW	OUT											
16	Eve	LOW	OUT												
17	Jen	OUT													

^Note 1: The chef(s) did not receive immunity for winning the Quickfire Challenge.
^Note 2: As a reward for winning the Quickfire Challenge, Kevin was allowed to sit out the Elimination Challenge.
^Note 3: Jesse was eliminated by placing last in the Quickfire Challenge.
^Note 4: As a reward for winning the Quickfire Challenge, Kevin was given the choice to receive either immunity or $15,000 as his prize. Kevin opted for the money, forfeiting his immunity.

(WINNER) The chef won the season and was crowned "Top Chef".
(RUNNER-UP) The chef was a runner-up for the season.
(WIN) The chef won the Elimination Challenge.
(HIGH) The chef was selected as one of the top entries in the Elimination Challenge, but did not win.
(IN) The chef was not selected as one of the top or bottom entries in the Elimination Challenge and was safe.
(LOW) The chef was selected as one of the bottom entries in the Elimination Challenge, but was not eliminated.
(OUT) The chef lost the Elimination Challenge.

== Episodes ==
No. overall	No. in season	Title	Original release date
74	1	"Sin City Vice"	August 19, 2009
Quickfire Challenge (Round 1): The 17 chefs were divided into four teams to compete in a mise en place relay race in which each member performed one of four tasks: shuck 15 clams, peel 30 spot prawns, clean five lobsters, or butcher two chops from an entire prime rib. The chefs drew poker chips to determine their teams (black, blue, green, or red); whoever drew the single gold chip was exempt from participating in the Quickfire and received immunity in the Elimination Challenge. The first team to finish all four tasks won the challenge.: Red Team: Eve, Kevin, Michael, Preeti; Blue Team: Bryan, Jennifer, Jesse, Mattin; Green Team: Ash, Jen, Laurine, Ron; Black Team: Ashley, Eli, Hector, Mike; Winner: Blue Team; Quickfire Challenge (Round 2): Each member of the winning team was given 30 minutes to cook a dish using the ingredients they worked with during the mise en place. The chef with the winning dish received $15,000. The receiver of the gold chip from the previous round was also given the opportunity to trade in their immunity for a chance to compete.: Winner: Jennifer (Clam Ceviche with Citron Vinegar); Elimination Challenge: The chefs, battling against the other contestants in their Quickfire teams, cooked a dish inspired by one of their personal vices. The receiver of the gold chip from the Quickfire was able to join the team of their choice. One member from each team was eligible for the win and another member was put up for elimination. Wolfgang Puck guest judges.: Winner: Kevin ("Procrastination": Arctic Char with Turnip Salsa Verde and Celery Salad); Eliminated: Jen ("Hot Temper": Chile Relleno Stuffed with Seitan & Tomatillo Salsa)
75	2	"Bachelor/ette Party"	August 26, 2009
Quickfire Challenge: The chefs each rolled a pair of six-sided dice at a craps table in the Top Chef kitchen. They then had 30 minutes to create a dish with the number of ingredients they rolled on the dice (two through ten), not counting salt, pepper, and oil. The winner received immunity from elimination and $15,000. Celebrity chef and restaurant owner Todd English appeared as the episode's guest judge.: Winner: Michael (Nitro Gazpacho, Compressed Cucumbers & Toast); Elimination Challenge: In order to cater a bachelor/bachelorette party, the group split between males and females for a battle of the sexes. The men prepared dishes for the bride-to-be, while the women cooked for the prospective groom. At least two dishes had to be paired with each of the three cocktails the couple had chosen to serve their guests: Moscow Mule, tequila shots, or Golden Delicious (Goldschläger and sparkling apple cider). Each team was given $800 with 30 minutes to shop, two hours to prep, and one hour to set up their tables before poolside service the next day.: Winner: Bryan (Tequila Shot: Sweet & Sour Macaroon Filled with Guacamole, Corn Nuts & Corn Purée); Eliminated: Eve (Tequila Shot: Shrimp & Avocado Ceviche with Smokey Tomato Salsa & Popcorn)
76	3	"Thunderbirds"	September 2, 2009
Quickfire Challenge: Each chef created an "out of this world" dish using an assortment of different potatoes. The winner received immunity from elimination.: Winner: Jennifer (Steamed Mussels, Yukon Gold and Blue Potatoes with Lemongrass Potato Sauce); Elimination Challenge: With limited time and supplies, the chefs catered a meal for 300 airmen at Nellis Air Force Base. The contestants worked as one team, but they later decided to split up into smaller groups of two and make one dish each. Chef Mark Peel guest judges.: Winner: Michael (Braised Pork Belly with Soy-Mustard Sauce & Peanuts in Lettuce Wrap); Eliminated: Preeti (Pasta Salad with Broccoli, Peppers, Sun-Dried Tomatoes & Artichoke Hearts)
77	4	"Vivre Las Vegas"	September 9, 2009
Quickfire Challenge: As a tribute to the continuing popularity of French cuisine in the United States, each chef created a dish using escargot. The winner received immunity in the Elimination Challenge and a prize to be announced later, while the loser was sent home. After announcing the bottom three dishes, the chefs who cooked them were each given a second chance to save themselves, with 20 minutes to make an amuse-bouche. Acclaimed French chef and restaurateur Daniel Boulud was the guest judge.: Winner: Kevin (Escargot Fricassee with Mushrooms, Brussels Sprouts & Candied Bacon Jam); Eliminated: Jesse ("ELT": Escargot, Mache & Fried Tomato; Tuna Tartare with Sorrel, Gooseberries, Fried Quail Egg & Fried Bread); Elimination Challenge: Each chef drew a knife labelled with either a traditional French sauce or a protein. The chefs then paired up each protein with its traditional sauce to create a six-course meal for a table of esteemed French chefs, including Daniel Boulud, Hubert Keller, Jean Joho, Laurent Tourondel, and Joël Robuchon. The winner of the Quickfire was exempt from the challenge.: First Course: Frogs' Legs (Ron) and Sauce Meunière (Robin); Second Course: Trout (Bryan) and Sauce Béarnaise (Mike); Third Course: Lobster (Laurine) and Sauce Américaine (Eli); Fourth Course: Young Chicken (Ashley) and Sauce Velouté (Mattin); Fifth Course: Rabbit (Michael) and Sauce Chasseur (Jennifer); Sixth Course: Chateaubriand (Hector) and Sauce au Poivre (Ash); Winner: Bryan (Warm Cured Trout with Deconstructed Béarnaise); Eliminated: Hector (Chateaubriand, Sauce au Poivre with Confit de Pommes & Spinach)
78	5	"Camping"	September 16, 2009
Quickfire Challenge: The chefs cooked dishes using a viewer-selected ingredient: cactus. The winning chef received $15,000, but no immunity.: Winner: Mike (Cactus & Tuna Ceviche with Pipián); Elimination Challenge: The chefs prepared a high-end lunch dish on an outdoor ranch for two dozen cowboys, using fire pits and limited supplies. Chef Tim Love guest judges.: Winner: Bryan (Roasted Pork Loin, Corn Polenta, Dandelion Greens & Glazed Rutabaga); Eliminated: Mattin (Ceviche Three Ways: Salmon with Apple, Spicy Tuna & Cod with Corn)
79	6	"Penn & Teller"	September 23, 2009
Quickfire Challenge: The chefs had to create two contrasting dishes, inspired by "the angel and the devil on their shoulder." The winner received immunity in the Elimination Challenge.: Winner: Robin (Angel: Arugula, Apple & Fennel Salad; Devil: Cardamom Apple Ginger Crisp); Elimination Challenge: The chefs were asked to deconstruct a classic recipe and re-imagine its components into their own signature dishes to be served at a meal for Penn & Teller. Michelle Bernstein guest judges.: Winner: Kevin (Chicken Mole: Chicken Croquette, Mexican Coffee Fig Jam, Pumpkin Seed Romesco); Eliminated: Ron (Seafood Paella: Lemon & Herb Oil, Chayote & Peas)
80	7	"Dinner Party"	October 7, 2009
Quickfire Challenge: The chefs used a slot machine to determine the themes (mood, taste/texture, and origin of cuisine) of their dish. The winner was given a choice between immunity or $15,000.: Winner: Kevin (Stressed, Hot and Spicy, Asian: Char-Grilled Pork with Vietnamese Herb Salad); Elimination Challenge: The chefs were teamed up via a blind knife draw and received market bags from various dinner guests, including Tyler Florence, Nancy Silverton, Govind Armstrong, Takashi Yagihashi, and Tom Douglas. Working in teams of the two, the contestants cooked and served a dinner for the guests at the Top Chef house. The winner received a $10,000 gift card from Macy's.: Armstrong: Ashley and Eli; Douglas: Jennifer and Kevin; Florence: Bryan and Laurine; Silverton: Ash and Michael; Yagihashi: Mike and Robin; Winner: Jennifer (BBQ Kobe Beef with Cardamom, Tomato & Ginger Broth); Eliminated: Ashley (Grilled Spot Prawns with Red Beet Crème Fraîche Sauce, Gnocchi & Kale)
81	8	"Pigs and Pinot"	October 14, 2009
Quickfire Challenge: The chefs made dishes to pair with a designated type and brand of crunchy snack foods. From this point forward, the winners of the Quickfire no longer received immunity from elimination.: Winner: Eli (Potato Clam Salad with Fennel, Celery & White Truffle Sauce); Elimination Challenge: The chefs were required to create a dish using a designated cut of pork, which they had to pair with a self-chosen Pinot noir as part of Chef Charlie Palmer's annual Pigs & Pinot charity fundraiser. Cuts of pork were assigned by blind knife draw. The chef that drew the "wildcard" knife was allowed to select their cut. The winner received an invitation to participate in the 2010 ''Pigs & Pinot'' event.: Winner: Kevin (Pork Leg Pâté, Pickled Cherries, and Wild Mushroom Salad; 2006 Sokol Blosser Dundee Hills Pinot Noir); Eliminated: Ash (Chilled Pork Tenderloin with corn and cherry salad; 2007 Sanford Pinot Noir)
82	9	"Restaurant Wars"	October 21, 2009
Quickfire Challenge: The chefs, in two teams of four, competed in a tag team cook-off, with Rick Moonen serving as a guest judge. First, the contestants drew knives. The two chefs who drew the knives designated "first choice" and "second choice" picked the teams. Next, the teams had to decide what order they would cook in. During their designated cooking time, the chefs were not allowed to communicate with each other in regards to the components of their dish. The teams had 40 minutes total (10 minutes individually) to alternate execution of the dish. The winning team was given a choice between splitting $10,000 between the group members or carrying it into the Elimination Challenge. In the latter case, if the same team won, each chef would receive $10,000 instead; however, if the team lost, the prize money would be surrendered to the opposing team.: Red Team: Bryan, Eli, Michael, Robin; Blue Team: Jennifer, Kevin, Mike, Laurine; Winner: Blue Team (Sablefish with Sautéed Mushrooms, Shiitake Broth & Radish Salad in Yuzu Vinaigrette); Elimination Challenge: Using the same teams as in the Quickfire, the chefs participated in "Restaurant Wars". Each team cooked and served in one of Moonen's kitchens and dining rooms at his restaurant, RM Seafood. The winning Quickfire team was given their choice of the kitchen; the Blue Team chose the upstairs restaurant. The Blue Team also decided to gamble their prize money from the Quickfire Challenge.: R∃Volt: Michael (EC), Bryan, Eli (FOH), Robin; 1st Course: Smoked Arctic Char with Beets, Horseradish Sour Cream & Potatoes (Bryan & Eli); Pressed Chicken with Calamari Noodles, Tomato Confit & Fennel Salad (Michael); 2nd Course: Duo of Beef, Braised Short Ribs & Prime NY Strip (Bryan); Cod with Parsley Sauce, Billi-Bi Croquette & Zucchini Tenderloin (Michael); 3rd Course: Ganache with Spearmint Ice Cream & Chocolate Tuiles (Bryan); Pear Pithivier with Vanilla Ice Cream & Elderflower Syrup (Robin); Mission: Jennifer, Kevin (EC), Mike, Laurine (FOH); 1st Course: Asparagus and Six-Minute Egg (Mike); Arctic Char Tartare (Mike); 2nd Course: Trout with Brown Butter Emulsion, Hazelnuts & Braised Endive (Jennifer); Alaskan Halibut with Mussels, Clams & Saffron Aioli in Consommé (Jennifer); 3rd Course: Lamb with Carrot Jam, Green Bean Salad & Morel Mushroom Sauce (Kevin & Laurine); Glazed Pork Belly, Pork Sausage, Cornmeal Mousseline & Red-Eye Gravy (Kevin); Winner: Michael; Eliminated: Laurine
83	10	"Meat Natalie"	October 28, 2009
Quickfire Challenge: The chefs picked classic television series by blind knife draw and were told to make a TV dinner inspired by the series. The winning chef had their dish featured in the Top Chef line of frozen foods. Chef Paul Bartolotta guest judges.: Winner: Kevin (The Sopranos: Meatballs with Polenta, Roasted Cauliflower & Roasted Pear); Elimination Challenge: At Tom Colicchio's Craftsteak restaurant, the chefs each prepared a vegetarian dish for Natalie Portman and her friends.: Winner: Kevin (Duo of Mushrooms, Smoked Kale, Candied Garlic & Turnip Purée); Eliminated: Mike (Whole Roasted Leeks with Onion Jus, Baby Carrot Purée & Fingerling Potatoes)
84	11	"Top Chef All-Stars Dinner"	November 4, 2009
The Top Chef All-Stars Dinner special, which aired on November 4, 2009, was a reunion dinner hosted by Season 5 competitor Fabio Viviani. The guests included several past Top Chef contestants, including Harold Dieterle and Tiffani Faison from Season 1; Ilan Hall and Marcel Vigneron from Season 2; Hung Huynh, Dale Levitski, and Casey Thompson from Season 3; Lisa Fernandes and Richard Blais from Season 4; and Stefan Richter and Carla Hall from Season 5.
85	12	"Strip Around the World"	November 11, 2009
Quickfire Challenge: The chefs created "breakfast in bed" dishes for host Padma Lakshmi and guest judge Nigella Lawson. The winning recipe was the only Quickfire dish from Season 6 to be put in the Top Chef Quickfire cookbook.: Winner: Eli (Fried Egg Reuben Benedict with Thousand Island Hollandaise Sauce); Elimination Challenge: The chefs prepared small plates inspired by Vegas casinos for 175 guests at a reception held at the World Market Center. The winner received a bottle of Terlato Wine and a two-day, three-night trip to the Terlato Family Vineyards in Napa Valley.: Winner: Michael (New York, New York: Boneless Chicken Wing Confit with Curry & Blue Cheese Disc); Eliminated: Robin (Bellagio: Panna Cotta)
86	13	"Culinary Olympics"	November 18, 2009
Quickfire Challenge: The final five chefs participated in a version of the Bocuse d'Or cooking competition that was established by legendary French chef Paul Bocuse. The chefs had to create their own version of Gavin Kaysen's dish for the 2007 Bocuse d'Or: a ballotine of chicken, chicken liver, and crayfish. The winner received an extra thirty minutes of cooking time during the Elimination Challenge.: Winner: Jennifer (Calamari Steak, Scallops, Salmon, Shiitake, Shiso with Rice Noodle Salad); Elimination Challenge: Each chef prepared a presentation platter for the Bocuse d'Or with one protein (Atlantic salmon or lamb) and two garnishes. The winner received $30,000 and the opportunity to compete to represent the United States in the 2011 Bocuse d'Or. In attendance were Paul Bocuse's son chef Jérôme Bocuse, chef Thomas Keller, chef Daniel Boulud, chef Traci Des Jardins, chef Timothy Hollingsworth, and chef Alessandro Stratta.: Winner: Kevin (Poached Lamb Loin, Sherry-glazed Golden Beets & Asparagus in Sunchoke Cream); Eliminated: Eli (Sausage-Wrapped Lamb Loin, Ras el Hanout & Carrot Puree, Tomato-Piquillo Marmalade)
87	14	"Napa Finale, Part 1"	December 2, 2009
Quickfire Challenge: After the competition moved to Napa, California for the season finale, the four remaining chefs had to create a dish using grapes. The winner received a brand new third generation Toyota Prius.: Winner: Michael (Grape Leaf Stuffed with "Couscous", Vinegar Glazed Grape & Scallop Kabob); Elimination Challenge: The chefs created two dishes to serve to 150 guests at a "crush party" to celebrate the grape harvest. With the exception of salt and pepper, all the ingredients had to be local. In addition, one dish had to be vegetarian. Chef Michael Chiarello guest judges.: Winner: Bryan (Goat Cheese Ravioli, Delicata Squash Purée & Bronze Fennel; Fig-Glazed Short Ribs, Celeriac Purée, Wax Beans & Wild Arugula); Eliminated: Jennifer (Chevre Mousse with Honey Mushrooms, Braised Radishes & Basil; Braised Duck Legs, Confit of Duck Breast, Squash Purée & Foie Gras Vinaigrette)
88	15	"Napa Finale, Part 2"	December 9, 2009
Elimination Challenge: The finalists were asked to create a four-course tasting menu, with each dish meeting certain requirements. The first course had to be inspired by a favorite dish from the chefs' childhoods. The second course required the contestants to use all the ingredients contained in a mystery box. The third course was the chef's choice, and the final course had to be a dessert. The finalists drew knives to determine which two previously eliminated contestants from the season would act as their sous chefs. Kevin drew Ash and Preeti; Bryan drew Ashley and Jennifer; and Michael drew Eli and Jesse.: Bryan: First Course: Sardine, German Butterball Potato, Heirloom Tomato & Panko Bread Crumbs; Second Course: Rockfish Sous Vide, Kabocha Squash with Curry & Meyer Lemon; Third Course: Venison Saddle with Purée of Sunchokes & Orange Juniper Sauce; Fourth Course: "Dulce de Leche" Cheesecake with Fig Sorbet, Poached Pear & Basil; Kevin: First Course: Southern Fried Chicken Skin with Squash Casserole & Tomato; Second Course: Pacific Rockfish, Roasted Squash, Crab Broth & Roasted Matsutake Mushroom; Third Course: Slow Roasted Pork Belly with Brussels Sprouts, Broccoli & Caramelized Ham Jus; Fourth Course: Roasted Banana, Toasted Peanut with Chocolate Bacon Mousse & Bacon Brittle; Michael: First Course: Cream of Dehydrated Broccoli, Fried Broccoli & Spot Prawn; Second Course: Dashi-Glazed Rockfish, Sweet and Sour Crab Salad with Squash & Meyer Lemon; Third Course: Fennel-Scented Squab Breast, Pistachio Cassoulet & Textures of Mushrooms; Fourth Course: Chocolate Caramel Coulant, Butternut Squash Brûlée & Butternut Ice Cream; Winner: Michael; Runners-up: Bryan, Kevin
89	16	"Watch What Happens Reunion"	December 16, 2009
