= Top Chef: New York =

Season 5 of American television series

- Season 5
- Hosted by: Padma Lakshmi
- Judges: Tom Colicchio; Gail Simmons; Toby Young
- No. of contestants: 17
- Winner: Hosea Rosenberg
- Runners-up: Stefan Richter; Carla Hall
- Location: New York City, New York
- Finals venue: New Orleans, Louisiana
- Fan Favorite: Fabio Viviani
- No. of episodes: 15

Release
- Original network: Bravo
- Original release: November 12, 2008 – March 4, 2009

Season chronology
- ← Previous; Chicago Next → Las Vegas

Top Chef: New York is the fifth season of the American reality television series Top Chef. It was first filmed in New York City, New York, before concluding in New Orleans, Louisiana. The season premiered on Bravo on November 12, 2008, and ended on March 4, 2009. In the season finale, Hosea Rosenberg was declared the winner over runners-up Stefan Richter and Carla Hall. Fabio Viviani was voted Fan Favorite.

== Contestants ==
Seventeen chefs competed in Top Chef: New York.

Name	Hometown	Current Residence (Note: The contestants' city and state of residence during time of filming.)	Age
Leah Cohen	Scarsdale, New York	New York, New York	26
Radhika Desai	Chicago, Illinois		28
Ariane Duarte	Verona, New Jersey		41
Patrick Dunlea	Quincy, Massachusetts	Hyde Park, New York	21
Alex Eusebio	New York, New York	Los Angeles, California	33
Daniel Gagnon	New Hyde Park, New York		26
Carla Hall	Nashville, Tennessee	Washington, D.C.	44
Melissa Harrison	Sparks, Maryland	Boulder, Colorado	28
Lauren Hope	Cincinnati, Ohio	Savannah, Georgia	24
Jamie Lauren	New York, New York	San Francisco, California	30
Jeff McInnis	Niceville, Florida	Miami, Florida	30
Stefan Richter	Tampere, Finland	Santa Monica, California	35
Hosea Rosenberg	Taos, New Mexico	Boulder, Colorado	34
Jill Snyder	Latrobe, Pennsylvania	Baltimore, Maryland	28
Richard Sweeney	Sayville, New York	San Diego, California	27
Eugene Villiatora	Whitmore Village, Hawaii	Las Vegas, Nevada	33
Fabio Viviani	Florence, Italy	Moorpark, California	30

Carla Hall, Fabio Viviani, and Jamie Lauren returned to compete in Top Chef: All-Stars. Stefan Richter returned for Top Chef: Seattle, and later competed in Top Chef Duels.

== Contestant progress ==
Episode #		1	2	3	4	5	6^{3}	7	8	9	10	11	12	13	14
Quickfire Challenge Winner(s)		Stefan	Radhika	Leah	Leah	Hosea	Ariane	Radhika	Stefan	Leah^{1} Radhika^{1}	Stefan^{1}	Stefan^{1}	Carla^{1}	Jeff^{1}^{4}	N/A
Contestant		Elimination Challenge Results													
1	Hosea	IN	LOW	WIN	IN	HIGH	WIN	IN	LOW	IN	HIGH	LOW	LOW	HIGH	WINNER
2	Stefan	WIN	IN	WIN	IN	HIGH	HIGH	HIGH	WIN	WIN	LOW	WIN	LOW	LOW	RUNNER-UP
2	Carla	IN	HIGH	IN	IN	LOW	IN	LOW	WIN	LOW	WIN	HIGH	HIGH	WIN	RUNNER-UP
4	Fabio	IN	WIN	WIN	HIGH	IN	IN	IN	IN	HIGH	LOW	HIGH	WIN	OUT	
4	Jeff	IN	IN	LOW	HIGH	HIGH	HIGH	IN	IN	IN	OUT			OUT^{4}	
6	Leah	HIGH	IN	WIN	IN	IN	IN	IN	LOW	IN	HIGH	LOW	OUT		
7	Jamie	IN	HIGH	WIN	LOW	HIGH	LOW	WIN	WIN	IN	HIGH	OUT			
8	Radhika	IN	IN	WIN	IN	HIGH	HIGH	IN	IN	OUT					
9	Ariane	LOW	LOW	IN	WIN	WIN	IN	HIGH	OUT						
10	Eugene	HIGH	IN	IN	IN	LOW	LOW	OUT^{3}							
10	Melissa	IN	IN	WIN	LOW	IN	LOW	OUT^{3}							
12	Daniel	IN	IN	LOW	IN	OUT									
13	Alex	IN	IN	IN	OUT										
14	Richard	IN	IN	OUT											
15	Jill	IN	OUT												
16	Patrick	OUT													
17	Lauren	OUT^{2}													

^Note 1: The chef(s) did not receive immunity for winning the Quickfire Challenge.
^Note 2: Lauren was eliminated by placing last in the Quickfire Challenge.
^Note 3: Due to a refrigerator malfunction which spoiled some of the chefs' ingredients during the Elimination Challenge, no one was eliminated. Consequently, two chefs were eliminated in the following episode.
^Note 4: Leah, Jamie, and Jeff (the three most recently eliminated contestants) were brought back to the competition to compete in a Quickfire Challenge. The winner would compete in the subsequent Elimination Challenge, but could only move on to the season finale if they won the challenge. Jeff won the Quickfire, and the judges picked him as one of their favorites in the Elimination Challenge, but did not select him to win. Consequently, he was automatically eliminated.

(WINNER) The chef won the season and was crowned "Top Chef".
(RUNNER-UP) The chef was a runner-up for the season.
(WIN) The chef won the Elimination Challenge.
(HIGH) The chef was selected as one of the top entries in the Elimination Challenge, but did not win.
(IN) The chef was not selected as one of the top or bottom entries in the Elimination Challenge and was safe.
(LOW) The chef was selected as one of the bottom entries in the Elimination Challenge, but was not eliminated.
(OUT) The chef lost the Elimination Challenge.

== Episodes ==
No. overall	No. in season	Title	Original release date
59	1	"Melting Pot"	November 12, 2008
Quickfire Challenge: The chefs were welcomed to the Big Apple by host Padma Lakshmi and head judge Tom Colicchio with a signature ingredient: apples. The challenge was a skills tournament consisting of three rounds. The chef who finished first in the Quickfire Challenge would win immunity in the next challenge, while the chef who finished last would leave the show immediately.: Round 1: The chefs had to peel 15 apples, using paring knives only, as quickly as possible. The first nine to finish were safe. The remaining eight proceeded to Round Two.; Winner: Stefan; Safe: Ariane, Carla, Fabio, Hosea, Jamie, Jeff, Melissa, Richard; Round 2: The chefs brunoised apples until they filled up two cups. The first four to finish were safe. The last four remaining chefs were sent to Round Three.; Safe: Alex, Daniel, Eugene, Jill; Round 3: The remaining chefs were each given 20 minutes to "cook something that [would] convince [Tom Colicchio] that [they] should stay here for this challenge in New York". They were given a burner, a sauté pan, a choice of proteins and spices, and the apples they had prepared. After tasting, Colicchio choose one contestant to be eliminated from the competition.; Safe: Leah, Patrick, Radhika; Eliminated: Lauren; Elimination Challenge: Each of the chefs drew a knife from the knife block marked with one of eight New York City neighborhoods. The chefs, in pairs, cooked dishes which represented the ethnic cuisines of those neighborhoods: Astoria (Greek), Brighton Beach (Russian), Long Island City (Middle Eastern), Ozone Park (Latin), Jamaica (Jamaican), Little Italy (Italian), Chinatown (Chinese), Little India/Curry Hill (Indian). The two dishes from each neighborhood were judged head-to-head. The chefs with the winning dishes were safe, while the chefs with the losing dishes were eligible for elimination. The name of the winning chef for each match-up are indicated below in italics. The judges then selected their favorite and least favorite dishes from among the eligible contestants. Chef Jean-Georges Vongerichten guest judges.: Middle Eastern: Ariane vs. Stefan; Greek: Richard vs. Jamie; Jamaican: Jill vs. Radhika; Latin: Fabio vs. Jeff; Russian: Hosea vs. Carla; Italian: Leah vs. Melissa; Chinese: Daniel vs. Patrick; Indian: Alex vs. Eugene; Winner: Stefan (Lamb Chops with Tabouli Salad & Beef Onion Skewer); Eliminated: Patrick (Seared Salmon, Bok Choy with Black Rice Noodles)
60	2	"Show Your Craft"	November 19, 2008
Quickfire Challenge: The chefs were asked to create their version of a classic, well-loved New York dish: the hot dog. They competed against Angelina DiAngelo of Dominick's Hot Dog Truck in Queens. The contestants each had 45 minutes and access to the Top Chef pantry to prepare and present their dish to host Padma Lakshmi and guest judge Donatella Arpaia, a successful restaurateur and food expert. The winner received immunity from elimination in the next challenge.: Winner: Radhika (Kabob-Style Sausage with Caramelized Onions, Cucumbers & Tomato Jam); Elimination Challenge: The chefs were asked to open a "Top Chef restaurant" in Manhattan and create a three-course New American lunch menu for 50 diners. Each chef was responsible for creating his or her own dish. The competitors were given 30 minutes to shop at Whole Foods Market and a budget of $2,500 for the entire group. During the two-hour prep time, Tom Colicchio came into the kitchen to make an announcement: the restaurant the chefs would be cooking lunch at was Craft, Colicchio's own flagship New York location. In addition, the 50 diners were all New York City chefs who auditioned for Top Chef: New York and did not make the cut.: Team Appetizer: Fabio, Hosea, Jamie, Leah, Melissa; Team Entrée: Alex, Eugene, Jeff, Jill, Stefan; Team Dessert: Ariane, Carla, Daniel, Radhika, Richard; Winner: Fabio (Beef Carpaccio with Arugula Salad, Parmesan, Balsamic Vinaigrette & Spherical Olives); Eliminated: Jill (Ostrich Egg Quiche with Rice-Pecan Crust, Asparagus & Aged Cheese)
61	3	"A Foo Fighters Thanksgiving"	November 26, 2008
Quickfire Challenge: Padma Lakshmi announced that this week's challenges was about "rolling with the punches." The chefs were asked to draw knives. Each knife was marked with a number, which referred to a specific page in Top Chef: The Cookbook. The contestants were given an hour to put their own spin on the recipes made by chefs from previous seasons. However, ten minutes into the Quickfire, Lakshmi and guest judge Grant Achatz told everyone to convert their dishes into soups. The chefs had to use their remaining 50 minutes to create their new dishes, using the Swanson's soup broths provided for them. The winner received immunity from elimination in the next challenge.: Winner: Leah (Chilled White Asparagus Soup with Brioche, Tuna & Olive Tapenade); Elimination Challenge: As the winner of the Quickfire Challenge, Leah was given the chance to choose her six teammates for the next challenge. She picked Fabio, Hosea, Jamie, Melissa, Radhika, and Stefan. The remaining contestants formed the second team. The chefs were asked to cook Thanksgiving dinner for the rock band Foo Fighters and its entire entourage of more than 60 guests, including several vegetarians. They cooked their dinner at the band's next venue, an outdoor kitchen at the Blue Cross Arena in Rochester, New York. There were no refrigerators, no freezers, and no stoves; only prep tables, microwaves, and toaster ovens. The contestants were given 15 minutes to create their menus, an hour and $1,200 per team to shop, and three hours to prepare their meals. The winning team was invited to attend the Foo Fighters concert that night, while the losing team was forced to clean up the kitchen after service. One member of the losing team was eliminated.: Team Sexy Pants: Fabio, Hosea, Jamie, Leah, Melissa, Radhika, Stefan; Team Cougar: Alex, Ariane, Carla, Daniel, Eugene, Jeff, Richard; Winner: Team Sexy Pants; Eliminated: Richard (Banana S'mores with Vanilla Cream & Chocolate Ganache)
62	4	"Today Show"	December 3, 2008
Quickfire Challenge: The chefs were given 30 minutes to create a breakfast amuse-bouche. The dishes were evaluated by Padma Lakshmi and Rocco DiSpirito, cookbook author and celebrity chef. The winner received immunity from elimination in the next challenge and a copy of DiSpirito's latest book, Rocco Gets Real.: Winner: Leah (Bacon, Quail Egg & Cheese with Grilled Bread); Elimination Challenge: The chefs were tested on both their culinary and telegenic skills. They were asked to create a dish that could be cooked and served for a 2½-minute television presentation which would be taped inside the Top Chef kitchen. Each chef had a $100 budget, 30 minutes to shop at Whole Foods Market, and an hour to prep their dish. The judges selected their three favorite dishes and three least favorite dishes. Later, the top three chefs were awoken by head judge Tom Colicchio at 2 a.m. for a twist; they were to be taken to the Rockefeller Center to cook their dishes for the hosts of NBC's The Today Show. During the live on-air broadcast, the hosts selected the winner of the challenge. The winning chef received a custom-made kit of two dozen chef's tools put together by Rocco DiSpirito, as well as an opportunity to present a dish live on The Today Show the morning after the episode aired.: Winner: Ariane (Beefsteak Tomato Salad with Watermelon & Feta Cheese); Eliminated: Alex (Rose Infused Crème Brûlée)
63	5	"Gail's Bridal Shower"	December 10, 2008
Quickfire Challenge: The chefs arrived in the Top Chef kitchen to find host Padma Lakshmi alone, with no guest judge. The chefs drew knives to choose their competitors. Each pair was taken into a darkened kitchen and given 15 seconds to taste a specific sauce. The contestants then had to bid on the number of ingredients they thought that they could correctly name. Bids passed back and forth until one chef challenged the other to match the last placed bid. If a complete list of correct ingredients was given, the challenged chef moved on to the next round. Naming any incorrect ingredients ended the round and the challenger moved on. Three chefs competed in the final round, which took place in a spelling bee-style format. The winner received immunity from elimination in the next challenge.: Round 1: Shrimp & Lobster Bouillabaisse; Round 2: Thai Green Curry; Round 3: Mexican Mole Sauce; Winner: Hosea; Elimination Challenge: The chefs prepared a four-course meal for Top Chef judge Gail Simmons' bridal shower. Each course had to be inspired by one of the lines of the traditional wedding rhyme, "something old, something new, something borrowed, something blue." The chefs drew knives to determine the teams. Each team was given 30 minutes and a budget of $800 to shop at Whole Foods Market, and 2½ hours to prep their dishes in the Top Chef kitchen. The following day, the chefs had one hour to finish cooking and present their dishes to the bridal shower guests at 24 Fifth Avenue. The winner received a new set of Calphalon stainless cookware and kitchen electrics. Food & Wine editor Dana Cowin guest judges.: Team Old: Hosea, Jeff, Stefan; Team New: Carla, Daniel, Eugene; Team Borrowed: Ariane, Jamie, Radhika; Team Blue: Fabio, Leah, Melissa; Winner: Ariane (Indian Spiced Lamb on Carrot Purée with Raita & Wilted Kale); Eliminated: Daniel (Tempura Shrimp, Beef Skewer with Peach-Miso BBQ Sauce & Yuzu Sorbet)
64	6	"12 Days of Christmas"	December 17, 2008
Quickfire Challenge: The chefs arrived to find the Top Chef kitchen decorated for Christmas, with Padma Lakshmi waiting to present their next challenge; they had to create a "one-pot wonder", a holiday meal that could be prepared in one cooking vessel. The chefs had 45 minutes to cook and present their dishes to Lakshmi and guest judge, American icon Martha Stewart. The prize, in addition to immunity in the elimination challenge, was an autographed copy of Stewart's latest book, Martha Stewart's Cooking School.: Winner: Ariane (Cauliflower Purée with Herb-Rubbed Filet Mignon); Elimination Challenge: The chefs catered a 250-guest holiday party hosted by amfAR, the American Foundation for AIDS Research, at the Prince George Ballroom in New York City. The guest judges included chef Michelle Bernstein and actress Natasha Richardson. The chefs were given a hint for the inspiration behind their dishes with the arrival of the Harlem Gospel Choir, singing a rendition of The Twelve Days of Christmas. Lakshmi then asked the chefs to draw knives. The chefs were given 45 minutes to shop at Whole Foods Market and a budget of $800 to create a dish inspired by their verse. They had three hours to prep that night, one hour to prep and pack the next morning, and one hour to prepare their dishes on-site the next night. All four of the judges' favorites received copies of Michelle Bernstein's latest cookbook, Cuisine à Latina.: Winner: Hosea (Eleven Pipers Piping: Smoked Pork Loin with Chipotle Mashed Potatoes & Apple Brandy Jus); Eliminated: None (Note: The judges could not eliminate any of the chefs due to a refrigerator malfunction that left Hosea's and Radhika's primary proteins unusable, creating an unlevel playing field.)
65	7	"Focus Group"	January 7, 2009
Quickfire Challenge: The chefs arrived in the Top Chef kitchen to see Padma Lakshmi joined by Michelin star-winning chef, Jean-Christophe Novelli. In a Diet Dr Pepper-inspired challenge, the chefs had 45 minutes to craft a sugar-free dessert so good, the judges would think there was "nothing diet about it." The winner received immunity from elimination in the next challenge.: Winner: Radhika (Peach Lavender Bread Pudding with Sautéed White Peach & Roasted Cashews); Elimination Challenge: Judge Tom Colicchio visited the chefs in their apartment to split them into two groups by knife draw. As the winner of the Quickfire, Radhika was able to choose her team. The contestants were told that two chefs would be eliminated after the challenge, so they were allowed to cook whatever dish they thought would express their individuality. They were given $100 and 30 minutes to shop for a dinner for about 10 people, including the four judges and an unspecified number of mystery food experts. In their groups, the chefs were given two hours to cook at the Astor Center, where they served their dishes family-style to the judges. However, there were some twists: the challenge was a blind tasting (the judges did not know who cooked what dish), and the mystery judges were the contestants from the other group. The chefs also watched the tasting through a hidden camera and a television installed in the kitchen, revealed after serving their dishes. This gave the chefs a viewing of the honest assessment of their fellow contestants and their new permanent judge, British food critic Toby Young.: Group A: Eugene, Fabio, Hosea, Jamie, Melissa, Radhika; Group B: Ariane, Carla, Jeff, Leah, Stephan; Winner: Jamie (Seared Scallops with Fennel, Garlic, Oranges & Olives); Eliminated: Eugene (Crispy Red Snapper with Tomato, Basil & Daikon Fettuccine) and Melissa (Ahi Tuna Crudo Tacos)
66	8	"Down on the Farm"	January 14, 2009
Quickfire Challenge: The chefs arrived in the Top Chef kitchen to see Padma Lakshmi standing with Hung Huynh, the winner of Top Chef: Miami. She stated that chefs of their caliber should have no problem creating great food when using the freshest and most seasonal ingredients. However, she then removed a cloth to reveal a display of canned goods, as well as other cupboard and pantry staples. The chefs then had 15 minutes to create a delicious dish using only these ingredients. The winner received immunity from elimination in the next challenge.: Winner: Stefan (Baked Bean & Spam Soup with Grilled Cheese, Spam Sandwich & Velveeta); Elimination Challenge: The chefs were asked to draw knives and split into three teams. The teams had to create a delicious, seasonal lunch for 16 people based on their assigned protein. Their menu had to be served family-style and include a dessert. They spent the night planning the menu. The next morning, instead of being taken to Whole Foods Market, they were driven to Stone Barns Center for Food & Agriculture, a farm in Pocantico Hills, New York owned by chef Dan Barber. The chefs were provided cuts of fresh meat from the farm's stock and were allowed to choose fresh produce grown on the grounds. They were given three hours to prepare a lunch for the farmers and chefs from Stone Barns and their families in the kitchen of Barber's on-site restaurant, Blue Hill at Stone Barns.: Team Chicken: Carla, Jamie, Stefan; Team Lamb: Ariane, Hosea, Leah; Team Pork: Fabio, Jeff, Radhika; Winner: Team Chicken; Eliminated: Ariane
67	9	"Restaurant Wars"	January 21, 2009
Quickfire Challenge: The chefs arrived in the Top Chef kitchen to see Padma Lakshmi standing with successful restaurateur Stephen Starr. Lakshmi and Starr explained that part of opening a restaurant was to do a tasting for prospective investors. Therefore, the chefs had a tasting for Stephen. The chefs then had 30 minutes and complete access to the Top Chef pantry to create one dish that showcased their concept for a potential restaurant. The top two chefs were chosen to be the team leaders in the next Elimination Challenge. From this point on, the winners of the Quickfire Challenge no longer received immunity from elimination.: Winners: Radhika (Pan-Seared Cod, Butter Braised Corn, Spinach & Chorizo with Cream Sauce); Leah (Tempura Poussin with Dashi, Soy Sauce & Rice Wine Vinegar); Elimination Challenge: For Restaurant Wars, the chefs, split into teams, had 24 hours to create a restaurant and open it for one night. Each team was given $5,000 to shop at Pier 1 Imports for decor, and $3,000 to spend on food at Whole Foods Market and Restaurant Depot, a restaurant provision warehouse. They had 6 hours to prep for the dinner service on location at Bridgewater's Restaurant, where they would later be serving 60 diners over a period of 5 hours. Radhika and Leah, as the Quickfire winners, got to choose and lead their teams. The winner of the challenge received a new suite of GE Monogram appliances.: Sahana: Carla, Jamie (EC), Jeff, Radhika (FOH); Appetizer: Whole-Wheat Naan Bread with Garlic Oil; Curried Carrot Soup with Smoked Paprika Oil & Raita; Chickpea Cake with Seared Scallop, Masala Tomato Sauce & Arugula Salad; Entrée: White Lentil Tabouli, Seared Snapper, Tomato Water & Pea Shoots; Cinnamon & Saffron Braised Lamb Shank with Israeli Couscous; Dessert: Spiced Chocolate Cake, Crème Fromage & Cashew Brittle; Fig & Minted Frozen Yogurts, Baklava Cigars; Sunset Lounge: Fabio (FOH), Hosea, Leah (EC), Stefan; Amuse-bouche: Vegetable Roll with Mushrooms, Carrots, Cabbage & Sweet Chili Sauce; Appetizer: Tuna & Salmon Sashimi, Radish Salad & Yuzu Vinaigrette; Coconut Curry Bisque with Shrimp Dumplings; Entrée: Braised Beef Short Ribs with Ginger, Vegetables & Beef Demi-Glace; Seared Black Cod, Fresh Vegetables & Chinese Cabbage; Third Course: Chocolate Rice Parfait, Grapefruit Jelly & Pineapple; Lemongrass & Ginger Panna Cotta, Peach Purée & Ginger Honey; Palate Cleanser: Frozen Mango, Bitter Chocolate & Mint Lollipop; Winner: Stefan; Eliminated: Radhika
68	10	"Super Bowl Chef Showdown"	January 28, 2009
Quickfire Challenge: The chefs arrived in the Top Chef kitchen to see Padma Lakshmi standing with chef Scott Conant. She then presented a chart with a set of hidden secret ingredients on the top row, and hidden food groups on the left column. The contestants had to each pick squares on different rows and columns, after which, Lakshmi revealed their corresponding food group. She then uncovered the secret ingredients, disclosing that the chefs would all be working with oats. For their Quaker Oats Quickfire Challenge, they were given 45 minutes to create a unique dish that paired whole grain oats with the food groups they had chosen. The winner did not receive immunity, but instead gained an advantage in the Elimination Challenge.: Winner: Stefan (Dairy: Banana Mousse with Quaker Oats, Oat-Almond & Oatmeal-Almond Crisp Petit Four); Elimination Challenge: For their elimination, the chefs, united as one team, competed in the first ever "Top Chef Bowl", against "all-star" contestants from past seasons of the show. Each Season 5 contestant competed against an all-star chef in a "head-to-head" cook-off, celebrating the regional cuisine of one of seven NFL teams (see below) and using a set of their assigned region's ingredients, provided for them in a "mystery box". Stefan, as the Quickfire winner, was allowed to choose which team's food he would be making and the all-star chef he would be cooking against. The other chefs, in their teams, had 5 minutes to decide who would be cooking what regional cuisine. Then, they were given 2 hours to experiment with their ingredients and prep for the cook-off. The next day, they were given 20 minutes to create their dishes, head-to-head at the Institute of Culinary Education, in front of an audience including ICE students and the previously eliminated contestants. In each round, if a chef received the majority of the judges' votes, they got a touchdown, worth 7 points. If they received a majority of the votes of five culinary students tasting their dish, they got a field goal, worth 3 points. If the judges were split evenly over whose food was the best, the student tasters decided who received all 10 points. The winner of the challenge received two tickets to Super Bowl XLIII in Tampa, Florida.: New York Giants: Leah vs. Nikki (season 4); Seattle Seahawks: Hosea vs. Miguel (season 1); New Orleans Saints: Carla vs. Andrew (season 4); Dallas Cowboys: Stefan vs. Andrea (season 1); San Francisco 49ers: Jamie vs. Camille (season 3); Miami Dolphins: Jeff vs. Josie (season 2); Green Bay Packers: Fabio vs. Spike (season 4); Winner: Carla (Crayfish & Andouille Gumbo over Stone-Ground Grits); Eliminated: Jeff (Rock Shrimp Ceviche with Sangria Sorbet)
69	11	"Le Bernardin"	February 4, 2009
Quickfire Challenge: The chefs walked into the Top Chef kitchen to see Padma Lakshmi standing with Eric Ripert, multi-award winning chef and owner of the highly acclaimed seafood restaurant, Le Bernardin. The chefs were tested on the precision and speed of their technique with a three-round fish filleting tournament. The chefs with the worst fillets of each round were eliminated, until one was left standing. The winner did not receive immunity, but instead gained an advantage in the Elimination Challenge.: Round 1: The chefs had 5 minutes to clean and butterfly two sardines.; Round 2: The remaining chefs had 5 minutes to clean and fillet an Arctic char.; Round 3: The last two chefs had 10 minutes to skin, clean and fillet a fresh water eel.; Winner: Stefan; Elimination Challenge: Eric Ripert invited the chefs to a six-course lunch at his restaurant, Le Bernardin, with Tom Colicchio and himself. After eating, Tom revealed that their Elimination Challenge was to recreate the six-course menu that was just served to them. Stefan, as the Quickfire winner, got to choose which dish he would be cooking, while the other chefs had to draw knives. They had 2 hours to prep in the main kitchen at the restaurant, with the ingredients from the recipes provided for them. Then, they had 15 minutes to cook in the private dining room kitchen, after which they would serve their dishes to the judges. The winner received a copy of Eric Ripert's book On the Line, an opportunity to shadow Ripert at three of his restaurants for one week, starting at Le Bernardin, with a room at the Ritz-Carlton Hotel, and a trip to the Food & Wine Festival at Pebble Beach.: Winner: Stefan (Baked Lobster with Asparagus & Hollandaise Sauce); Eliminated: Jamie ( Sautéed Black Bass & Braised Celery with Serrano Ham Peppercorn Sauce)
70	12	"The Last Supper"	February 11, 2009
Quickfire Challenge: The chefs walked into the Top Chef kitchen to see Padma Lakshmi next to Wylie Dufresne, culinary innovator and chef-owner of wd~50 in New York City. The chefs had one hour to create a dish incorporating eggs. The winner did not receive immunity, but instead gained an advantage in the Elimination Challenge.: Winner: Carla (Green Eggs & Ham with Green Tomato Salsa & Jalapeño Oil); Elimination Challenge: Lakshmi asked the chefs to draw knives, and they pulled the names of five different luminaries in the culinary world: celebrity chefs Lidia Bastianich, Marcus Samuelsson, Wylie Dufresne, Jacques Pépin, and James Beard Foundation president Susan Ungaro. Since it was the last meal of the competition in New York, these "superstars" were asked to choose their "last meal" (see below). Carla, as the Quickfire winner, was allowed to switch stars and their associated dishes with another contestant; she ultimately chose not to. The chefs had to create a five-course meal for these stars, as well as the judges, with each chef preparing the dish chosen by the chef whose name they selected. They had $300 and 30 minutes to shop at Whole Foods Market, and then two hours to cook their dishes at the Capitale in Lower Manhattan, where the dinner was held. The winner received a bottle of Terlato Angel's Peak Wine and a three-day, two-night trip to the Terlato vineyard.: Dufresne: Leah; Samuelsson: Stefan; Ungaro: Hosea; Bastianich: Fabio; Pépin: Carla; Winner: Fabio (Roasted Chicken with Herb-Roasted Potatoes & Caramelized Cipollini); Eliminated: Leah (Eggs Benedict with a Slow-Poached Egg & Bacon on Challah)
71	13	"Finale - Part I"	February 18, 2009
Quickfire Challenge: Six months after the taping of the previous episode, the chefs arrived at the Houmas House Plantation and Gardens in New Orleans, Louisiana. Here, they saw host Padma Lakshmi, head judge Tom Colicchio, and celebrity chef Emeril Lagasse, a television host and restaurant owner known as the "King of Creole Cuisine." Lakshmi told the remaining chefs that they could relax for this challenge, because they would not be competing; instead, three other chefs would. Jamie, Jeff, and Leah, the three most recently eliminated contestants, arrived from the Top Chef house. Colicchio explained that in the spirit of the rebirth of New Orleans, the three chefs had been given an opportunity to return to the competition. For their Quickfire Challenge, they had one hour to create a dish featuring one of New Orleans's most celebrated ingredients: crawfish. The winner would join the four finalists in the Elimination Challenge, but would have to win that challenge to reach the season finale. In addition, they also received a copy of Emeril's new book, Emeril at the Grill.: Winner: Jeff (Crawfish & Grits with Andouille & Beer); Elimination Challenge: The five finalists headed to Mardi Gras World, a Mardi Gras warehouse, where they met with Lakshmi and Lagasse. She explained that their Elimination Challenge was to cater the Krewe of Orpheus Masquerade Ball at the New Orleans Museum of Art, for roughly 100 guests. They each prepared a cocktail and two dishes, one of which had to be in the Creole style of cooking. As Emeril explained, Creole cooking is the city version of Louisiana cooking, influenced by the French, Spanish, and African-American cultures. They had five hours to prep and cook at Emeril's Delmonico, with access to all of the ingredients stocked there, and one hour to set up at the museum and meet with their respective bartender provided to assist them in serving their cocktail. The winner received a new 2009 Toyota Venza.: Winner: Carla (Cranberry & Lime Spritzer; Shrimp & Andouille Beignet with Creole Aioli; Oyster Stew with Potato, Bacon & Scallions); Eliminated: Jeff (Cucumber Mojito; Fried Oyster with Sausage & Arugula; Crawfish Pot de Crème) and Fabio ("Trinitini:" Red Bell Pepper with Rum; Sausage & Rabbit Maque Choux with Grits; Caserecci Pasta with Crawfish & Crab Stew)
72	14	"Finale - Part II"	February 25, 2009
Elimination Challenge: After breakfast on the Creole Queen, the final three chefs arrived at the Historic New Orleans Collection to meet with Lakshmi and Colicchio. They were instructed to cook the best three-course meal of their lives, with no restrictions, for twelve judges. Similar to past seasons, each contestant was allowed to pick a sous chef, which included the runners-up of previous seasons: Marcel Vigneron (season 2), Casey Thompson (season 3), and Richard Blais (season 4). The chefs drew knives to select the order in which they would select their sous chefs. Hosea had the first pick and chose to work with Richard. Stefan had the second pick and chose Marcel, leaving Carla to work with Casey. The chefs and their sous chefs then had two hours to prep at the Audubon Tea Room, and another three hours to cook their dishes at Commander's Palace, where the dinner would be held. On the day of the meal, they were told to create an additional hors d'œuvre using one of three meats: redfish, crab, or alligator. A king cake was used to determine which meat each chef would use; the chef that found the doll received their choice of protein, and then assigned the other proteins to the other two chefs. Hosea found it, and chose redfish as his protein. He assigned Carla to use crab and Stefan to work with alligator. John Besh, Hubert Keller, Rocco DiSpirito, Branford Marsalis, Ti Adelaide Martin, and Susan Spicer guest judge.: Carla: Appetizer: Shiso Soup with Blue Crab & Chayote Thai Salsa; First Course: Seared Red Snapper over Saffron Aioli, Braised Fennel & Grilled Clam; Second Course: Sous-Vide New York Strip Steak with Seared Potato Rod & Merlot Sauce; Third Course: Apple Tart Coin with Blue Cheese & Walnut Crumble; Hosea: Appetizer: Blackened Redfish on Corn Cake with Creole Rémoulade & Micro Cilantro; First Course: Tuna, Hamachi & Black Bass Sashimi with Fennel Oil, Citrus & Fried Tempura Bits; Second Course: Seared Scallop with Foie Gras on Pain Perdu, Apple Preserves & Foie Gras Foam; Third Course: Pan Roasted Venison, Chestnut & Celery Root Purée with Wild Mushrooms; Stefan: Appetizer: Alligator Soup with Celeriac, Parsley Leaves & Puff Pastry; First Course: Smoked Salmon & Halibut Carpaccio with Micro Greens, Citrus Vinaigrette & Caviar; Second Course: Pan Seared Squab, Braised Cabbage, Schupfnudeln, Foie Gras & Grape Jus; Third Course: Stracciatella Ice Cream, Chocolate Mousse, Vanilla Syrup & Banana Lollipop; Winner: Hosea; Runners-up: Carla, Stefan
73	15	"Watch What Happens Reunion"	March 4, 2009
