= Fabio Viviani (chef) =

Italian chef

- Born: October 10, 1978 (age 47); Florence, Italy
- Culinary career
- Cooking style: Italian
- Current restaurant(s): Firenze Osteria, Cafe Firenze, Siena Tavern, Bar Siena, Chuck Lager, Bar Cicchetti, Taverna Toscana
- Television shows: Top Chef: New York (2008); Top Chef: All-Stars (2011)

Fabio Viviani (born October 10, 1978, in Florence, Italy) is a chef, restaurateur, and cookbook writer who has appeared on reality television. He also sells a range of wines. In 2005 he moved from Florence to Southern California. In 2008 he appeared on the reality television competition series Top Chef, where he was voted the "fan favorite"; since then, he has had a second career as a television host, on-air personality, and product pitchman.

== Early life ==
Fabio Viviani grew up in Florence, Italy. At age 11 he worked nights at a local bakery and held several positions in the restaurant industry during his teenage years. In 1992, 14-year-old Viviani began working at the Il Pallaio trattoria in Florence, becoming sous chef by age 16, mentored by Italian restaurateur Simone Mugnaini. He was married in Italy and his wife managed his restaurants while he competed on Top Chef.

== Career ==
Viviani owned and operated seven restaurants in Florence, a farm house and 2 nightclubs by the time he was 27. In late 2005 he moved to Ventura County, CA, US and opened Café Firenze in Moorpark and, soon after, LA Italian restaurant Firenze Osteria in North Hollywood. Teaming up with Chicago's Dine|Amic Group, Viviani opened a third restaurant called Siena Tavern in Chicago in February 2013. Siena Tavern was reviewed favorably by the Chicago Tribune, Thrillist, and others. He also opened Mercato by Fabio Viviani for corporate lunches at two locations in Chicago. In February 2017, Chef Viviani opened a restaurant called Portico at the del Lago Resort and Casino in Tyre, New York.

Viviani holds several endorsement and licensing contracts with Bertolli Olive Oil, Smart Step Home Kitchen Mats, Picnic Time Giftware, and Bialetti Cookware.

Viviani runs a website, www.fabioviviani.com, where he posts original recipes, his Kitchen Academy blog, and upcoming events. In 2014 Viviani launched a free bi-weekly E-Magazine titled Fabio's Magazine, with recipes, wine blogs, lifestyle and health-related articles, and other content.

In late 2018 Viviani and Oklahoma City chef Jonathon Stranger launched Osteria OKC in Nichols Hills, an upscale residential and shopping city within the Oklahoma City metro.

=== Television ===
Viviani's first appearance on television was as a contestant on the fifth season of reality TV show Top Chef on the Bravo network. He came in fourth place, and was voted "Top Chef Fan Favorite" by viewers. Viviani returned to the show in 2010 to compete on Top Chef: All Stars. In 2012, he was one of four Top Chef alumni whose lives were followed on the Bravo reality show Life After Top Chef, which lasted for one season. He was also the host of Chow Ciao, a web series on Yahoo!, for which he won a Webby Award for "Best Web Personality/Host" in 2012.

Viviani has appeared in a number of television cooking segments and been a guest on television shows including Good Morning America, The Talk, The Chew, Ellen, Good Day LA, Access Hollywood, The Queen Latifah Show and Bethenny, as well as hosting a regular spot on the channel QVC selling kitchen products. He was also a guest host on the Hallmark Channel series Home and Family.

=== Books ===
Viviani's first cookbook, Cafe Firenze Cookbook: Food and Drink Recipes from the Tuscan Sons was published in August 2009. It was followed by Fabio's Italian Kitchen in April 2013. This cookbook was on the New York Times Best Seller List in May 2013. Fabio's American Home Kitchen was published in October 2014.

Viviani has released several e-books, including Did I Really Make Breakfast (Vol I & II), The Skinny Country, We The Soup and I Would Love To Meat You.

=== Controversy ===
On June 1, 2020, an employee, Lanfranco Pescante, of one of Viviani's establishments in Tampa, the Nocturnal Hospitality Group, was exposed for posting "shoot them all" in response to Tampa protesters. Pescante had also been associated with other messages featuring racial slurs and suggesting racial discrimination of his patrons. The FBI and State Attorney investigated him for violent comments and accusations of sex trafficking and rape by several Tampa Bay women. Some of the victims were minors, and others stated that some of the sexual misconduct occurred in establishments operated by the Nocturnal Hospitality Group. Fabio Viviani Group was never associated with Franklin Manor, the venue cited in the lawsuit.

In response to these developments and public backlash, Viviani immediately announced on June 4, 2020, that he was cutting ties with the Nocturnal Hospitality Group and its Tampa Bay restaurants Osteria Bar + Kitchen, and Mole y Abuela and Shibui. Viviani stated: "My whole Hospitality Group, Career and Venues have been built in the spirit of inclusiveness, equality, love and freedom for all, I cannot stand behind any form of hate or harassment nor being associated with people demonstrating such behaviours and for these reasons we have decided to cut ties with all our Tampa Partners and Operators".

== Restaurants ==
- Taverna Toscana – Bradenton, Florida
- Osteria – permanently closed – Tampa, Florida
- Osteria by Fabio Viviani – Downers Grove, Illinois
- Cafe Firenze – permanently closed Moorpark, California
- Firenze Osteria – permanently closed Hollywood, California
- Siena Tavern – Chicago, Illinois
- Bar Siena – Chicago, Illinois
- Portico – Waterloo, New York
- Osteria OKC – Nichols Hills, Oklahoma
- Chuck Lager – Wilmington, Delaware
- The Eatery – Washington, Pennsylvania
- Jars - Sweets and Things by Fabio Viviani
- Taverna Costale, St Petersburg, Fl, opened January 2022
- Bar Cicchetti – Columbus, Ohio
- Curfew - Memphis, Tennessee
- Giostra - South Barrington, Illinois
- Lago - Lake Zurich, Illinois
- Chuck Lager - Orland Park, Illinois
- 9 Prime - West Chester, Pennsylvania
- Ai Pazzi - Las Vegas, Nevada
- Zingaro Italian Restaurant - Cincinnati, Ohio
- Seville - Chicago, Illinois
- The Marketplace - Cabazon, California
