= Pressure Cooker (TV series) =

Cooking competition television series

- No. of seasons: 1
- No. of episodes: 8

Original release
- Network: Netflix
- Release: January 6, 2023 – present

Pressure Cooker is a cooking competition television series on Netflix. The premise of the show features chefs competing in various cooking challenges as they live in together in one house. The twist of the series is that unlike most other cooking shows (in which a panel of judges will judge each dish), the chefs themselves will judge one another's food.

The show has been described as a mix of Top Chef and Big Brother - combining the cooking challenges of the former, and the social politicking of the latter. Contestants included chefs such as Renee Blackman and Robbie Jester.

== Contestants ==
Contestants of Pressure Cooker
Contestant	Based	Outcome
Robbie Jester	Newark, Delaware	Winner
Mike Eckles	Bloomfield Hills, Michigan	Runner-up
Renee Blackman	New York City, New York	3rd place
Sergei Simonov	Santa Barbara, California	3rd place
Caroline Gutierrez	Atlanta, Georgia	5th place
Jeana Pecha	Sacramento, California	6th place
Ed Porter	Minneapolis, Minnesota	7th place
Lana Lagomarsini	New York City, New York	8th place
Brian Nadeau	Cranston, Rhode Island	9th place
Christan Willis	Atlanta, Georgia	10th place
Liv Bin	Los Angeles, California	11th place

== Contestant progress ==
Robbie won Pressure Cooker.
Mike was the runner-up.
WIN indicates that the contestant was one of the top chefs of the challenge.
SAFE indicates that the contestant safe from elimination.
BLJ (Blind Judge) indicates that the contestant was the challenge's blind judge and did not take part in the challenge.
BTM (Bottom) indicates that the contestant was up for elimination.
ELIM (Eliminated) indicates that the contestant was eliminated.
Guest indicates that the contestant returned as a guest.

Progress of contestants including placements in each challenge
Chefs	Challenge							
Chefs	1	2	3	4	5	6	7	8
Robbie	SAFE	WIN	SAFE	WIN	SAFE	BLJ	BTM	Winner
Mike	SAFE	WIN	SAFE	WIN	BLJ	BTM	WIN	Runner-up
Renee	WIN	SAFE	BLJ	WIN	BTM	WIN	ELIM	Guest
Sergei	SAFE	SAFE	WIN	BTM	WIN	WIN	ELIM	Guest
Caroline	SAFE	WIN	WIN	BTM	SAFE	ELIM		Guest
Jeana	BTM	WIN	SAFE	BTM	ELIM			Guest
Ed	SAFE	SAFE	BTM	WIN	ELIM			Guest
Lana	SAFE	WIN	SAFE	ELIM				Guest
Brian	BTM	BTM	ELIM					Guest
Christan	SAFE	ELIM						Guest
Liv	ELIM	Guest						Guest

== Episodes ==
Pressure Cooker season 1 has 8 episodes.

No.	Title
1	"Check Your Ego at the Door"
2	"Someone Is Lying"
3	"Eight Aprons, Nine Chefs"
4	"Traitors"
5	"Break Up the Alliance"
6	"Don't Take It Personally"
7	"Yelp Doesn't Count"
8	"Start Together, End Together"
