= List of Top Chef contestants =

Top Chef is an American reality competition television series. The contestants, sometimes referred to as "cheftestants", compete against each other in episodic challenges to become the next "Top Chef" and win a cash prize. The show has aired 23 seasons since its premiere in March 2006 and featured 330 different participants. Several contestants have competed in multiple seasons, such as with the two all-star editions. Many are also asked to reappear as guest judges on the show.

The contestants are selected through auditions. Although the series began with people with vastly differing amounts of cooking experience, such as a sommelier and culinary school student in the first season, later seasons would focus on casting professional chefs and restaurateurs. For a typical season, casting producers will perform a nationwide search, researching the latest recipients of culinary accolades, like the James Beard Foundation Awards and Michelin stars; reviewing recommendations from past competitors; and scouting social media and various cities across the United States for potential applicants.

Several Top Chef alumni have gone on to make regular appearances as hosts, judges, and contestants on other television shows, such as Chopped, Guy's Grocery Games, Bobby's Triple Threat, and Tournament of Champions on the Food Network, as well as Hell's Kitchen, Next Level Chef, and MasterChef on Fox.

== Contestants ==
Table key

The contestant competed a second time.
The contestant competed a third time.
The contestant competed a fourth time.

Season	Name	Age	Hometown	Current Residence (Note: The contestants' city, state, or country of residence during time of filming.)	Finish
Top Chef: San Francisco (Season 1)	Ken Lee	31	—N/a	Los Angeles, California	12th
Top Chef: San Francisco (Season 1)	Cynthia Sestito	52	—N/a	East Hampton, New York	11th
Top Chef: San Francisco (Season 1)	Brian Hill	37	—N/a	Los Angeles, California	10th
Top Chef: San Francisco (Season 1)	Candice Kumai	22	—N/a	Pasadena, California	9th
Top Chef: San Francisco (Season 1)	Lisa Parks	45	—N/a	Los Angeles, California	8th
Top Chef: San Francisco (Season 1)	Andrea Beaman	38	—N/a	New York, New York	7th
Top Chef: San Francisco (Season 1)	Miguel Morales	27	—N/a	New York, New York	6th
Top Chef: San Francisco (Season 1)	Stephen Asprinio	24	—N/a	Las Vegas, Nevada	5th
Top Chef: San Francisco (Season 1)	Lee Anne Wong	28	—N/a	New York, New York	4th
Top Chef: San Francisco (Season 1)	Dave Martin	40	—N/a	Long Beach, California	3rd
Top Chef: San Francisco (Season 1)	Tiffani Faison	28	—N/a	Las Vegas, Nevada	Runner-up
Top Chef: San Francisco (Season 1)	Harold Dieterle	28	—N/a	New York, New York	Winner
Top Chef: Los Angeles (Season 2)	Suyai Steinhauer	29	Oxford, England	New York, New York	15th
Top Chef: Los Angeles (Season 2)	Otto Borsich	46	Vermilion, Ohio	Las Vegas, Nevada	14th
Top Chef: Los Angeles (Season 2)	Emily Sprissler	30	Washington, D.C.	Las Vegas, Nevada	13th
Top Chef: Los Angeles (Season 2)	Marisa Churchill	28	San Francisco, California	San Francisco, California	11th (Note: The contestant was eliminated in a double elimination.)
Top Chef: Los Angeles (Season 2)	Josie Smith-Malave	31	Miami, Florida	Brooklyn, New York	11th
Top Chef: Los Angeles (Season 2)	Carlos Fernandez	36	Hoboken, New Jersey	Fort Lauderdale, Florida	10th
Top Chef: Los Angeles (Season 2)	Frank Terzoli	39	San Diego, California	San Diego, California	9th
Top Chef: Los Angeles (Season 2)	Mia Gaines-Alt	32	Oakland, California	Oakdale, California	8th
Top Chef: Los Angeles (Season 2)	Betty Fraser	44	San Francisco, California	Los Angeles, California	7th
Top Chef: Los Angeles (Season 2)	Michael Midgley	28	Stockton, California	Lodi, California	6th
Top Chef: Los Angeles (Season 2)	Cliff Crooks	28	New York, New York	West Caldwell, New Jersey	5th
Top Chef: Los Angeles (Season 2)	Sam Talbot	28	Charlotte, North Carolina	New York, New York	3rd
Top Chef: Los Angeles (Season 2)	Elia Aboumrad	23	Mexico City, Mexico	Las Vegas, Nevada	3rd
Top Chef: Los Angeles (Season 2)	Marcel Vigneron	26	Bainbridge Island, Washington	Las Vegas, Nevada	Runner-up
Top Chef: Los Angeles (Season 2)	Ilan Hall	26	Great Neck, New York	New York, New York	Winner
Top Chef: Miami (Season 3)	Clay Bowen	28	Columbus, Mississippi	Santa Barbara, California	15th
Top Chef: Miami (Season 3)	Sandee Birdsong	39	St. Simons Island, Georgia	Miami, Florida	14th
Top Chef: Miami (Season 3)	Micah Edelstein	33	Bridgewater, Massachusetts	Boca Raton, Florida	13th
Top Chef: Miami (Season 3)	Camille Becerra	34	Elizabeth, New Jersey	Brooklyn, New York	12th
Top Chef: Miami (Season 3)	Lia Bardeen	28	Tacoma, Washington	Brooklyn, New York	11th
Top Chef: Miami (Season 3)	Joey Paulino	29	Long Island, New York	New York, New York	10th
Top Chef: Miami (Season 3)	Sara Nguyen	25	Santa Monica, California	Chicago, Illinois	9th
Top Chef: Miami (Season 3)	Tre Wilcox	30	Duncanville, Texas	Cedar Hill, Texas	8th
Top Chef: Miami (Season 3)	Howie Kleinberg	31	Miami, Florida	Miami, Florida	7th
Top Chef: Miami (Season 3)	Chris "CJ" Jacobson	31	El Toro, California	Venice, California	6th
Top Chef: Miami (Season 3)	Sara Mair	34	Kingston, Jamaica	Miami, Florida	5th
Top Chef: Miami (Season 3)	Brian Malarkey	34	Bend, Oregon	San Diego, California	4th
Top Chef: Miami (Season 3)	Casey Thompson	29	Cedar Hill, Texas	Dallas, Texas	Runner-up
Top Chef: Miami (Season 3)	Dale Levitski	34	Chicago, Illinois	Chicago, Illinois	Runner-up
Top Chef: Miami (Season 3)	Hung Huynh	29	Pittsfield, Massachusetts	Las Vegas, Nevada	Winner
Top Chef: Chicago (Season 4)	Nimma Osman	26	Peachtree City, Georgia	Atlanta, Georgia	16th
Top Chef: Chicago (Season 4)	Valerie Bolon	32	Chicago, Illinois	Chicago, Illinois	15th
Top Chef: Chicago (Season 4)	Erik Hopfinger	38	Chappaqua, New York	San Francisco, California	14th
Top Chef: Chicago (Season 4)	Manuel Trevino	33	Laredo, Texas	New York, New York	13th
Top Chef: Chicago (Season 4)	Zoi Antonitsas	30	Seattle, Washington	San Francisco, California	12th
Top Chef: Chicago (Season 4)	Ryan Scott	28	Los Banos, California	San Francisco, California	11th
Top Chef: Chicago (Season 4)	Jennifer Biesty	35	Brooklyn, New York	San Francisco, California	10th
Top Chef: Chicago (Season 4)	Mark Simmons	29	Invercargill, New Zealand	New York, New York	9th
Top Chef: Chicago (Season 4)	Nikki Cascone	35	New York, New York	New York, New York	8th
Top Chef: Chicago (Season 4)	Andrew D'Ambrosi	30	Fort Lauderdale, Florida	New York, New York	7th
Top Chef: Chicago (Season 4)	Dale Talde	29	Chicago, Illinois	New York, New York	6th
Top Chef: Chicago (Season 4)	Spike Mendelsohn	27	Clearwater Beach, Florida	Washington, D.C.	5th
Top Chef: Chicago (Season 4)	Antonia Lofaso	31	Los Angeles, California	Los Angeles, California	4th
Top Chef: Chicago (Season 4)	Richard Blais	35	Uniondale, New York	Atlanta, Georgia	Runner-up
Top Chef: Chicago (Season 4)	Lisa Fernandes	27	Toronto, Ontario	New York, New York	Runner-up
Top Chef: Chicago (Season 4)	Stephanie Izard	31	Stamford, Connecticut	Chicago, Illinois	Winner
Top Chef: New York (Season 5)	Lauren Hope	24	Cincinnati, Ohio	Savannah, Georgia	17th
Top Chef: New York (Season 5)	Patrick Dunlea	21	Quincy, Massachusetts	Hyde Park, New York	16th
Top Chef: New York (Season 5)	Jill Snyder	28	Latrobe, Pennsylvania	Baltimore, Maryland	15th
Top Chef: New York (Season 5)	Richard Sweeney	27	Sayville, New York	San Diego, California	14th
Top Chef: New York (Season 5)	Alex Eusebio	33	New York, New York	Los Angeles, California	13th
Top Chef: New York (Season 5)	Danny Gagnon	26	New Hyde Park, New York	New Hyde Park, New York	12th
Top Chef: New York (Season 5)	Melissa Harrison	28	Sparks, Maryland	Boulder, Colorado	10th
Top Chef: New York (Season 5)	Eugene Villiatora	33	Whitmore Village, Hawaii	Las Vegas, Nevada	10th
Top Chef: New York (Season 5)	Ariane Duarte	41	Verona, New Jersey	Verona, New Jersey	9th
Top Chef: New York (Season 5)	Radhika Desai	28	Chicago, Illinois	Chicago, Illinois	8th
Top Chef: New York (Season 5)	Jamie Lauren	30	New York, New York	San Francisco, California	7th
Top Chef: New York (Season 5)	Leah Cohen	26	Scarsdale, New York	New York, New York	6th
Top Chef: New York (Season 5)	Jeff McInnis	30	Niceville, Florida	Miami, Florida	4th
Top Chef: New York (Season 5)	Fabio Viviani	30	Florence, Italy	Moorpark, California	4th
Top Chef: New York (Season 5)	Carla Hall	44	Nashville, Tennessee	Washington, D.C.	Runner-up
Top Chef: New York (Season 5)	Stefan Richter	35	Tampere, Finland	Santa Monica, California	Runner-up
Top Chef: New York (Season 5)	Hosea Rosenberg	34	Taos, New Mexico	Boulder, Colorado	Winner
Top Chef: Las Vegas (Season 6)	Jen Zavala	31	Cromwell, Connecticut	Philadelphia, Pennsylvania	17th
Top Chef: Las Vegas (Season 6)	Eve Aronoff	40	Ann Arbor, Michigan	Ann Arbor, Michigan	16th
Top Chef: Las Vegas (Season 6)	Preeti Mistry	33	San Francisco, California	San Francisco, California	15th
Top Chef: Las Vegas (Season 6)	Jesse Sandlin	30	Baltimore, Maryland	Baltimore, Maryland	14th
Top Chef: Las Vegas (Season 6)	Hector Santiago	41	San Juan, Puerto Rico	Atlanta, Georgia	13th
Top Chef: Las Vegas (Season 6)	Mattin Noblia	29	Biarritz, France	San Francisco, California	12th
Top Chef: Las Vegas (Season 6)	Ron Duprat	40	Mare Rouge, Haiti	Hollywood, Florida/Naples, Florida	11th
Top Chef: Las Vegas (Season 6)	Ashley Merriman	32	Center Sandwich, New Hampshire	Seattle, Washington	10th
Top Chef: Las Vegas (Season 6)	Ash Fulk	29	Pleasant Hill, California	New York, New York	9th
Top Chef: Las Vegas (Season 6)	Laurine Wickett	38	Rochester, New York	San Francisco, California	8th
Top Chef: Las Vegas (Season 6)	Mike Isabella	34	Little Ferry, New Jersey	Washington, D.C.	7th
Top Chef: Las Vegas (Season 6)	Robin Leventhal	43	Sun Valley, Idaho	Seattle, Washington	6th
Top Chef: Las Vegas (Season 6)	Eli Kirshtein	25	Atlanta, Georgia	Atlanta, Georgia	5th
Top Chef: Las Vegas (Season 6)	Jennifer Carroll	33	Philadelphia, Pennsylvania	Philadelphia, Pennsylvania	4th
Top Chef: Las Vegas (Season 6)	Kevin Gillespie	26	Atlanta, Georgia	Atlanta, Georgia	Runner-up
Top Chef: Las Vegas (Season 6)	Bryan Voltaggio	33	Frederick, Maryland	Urbana, Maryland	Runner-up
Top Chef: Las Vegas (Season 6)	Michael Voltaggio	30	Frederick, Maryland	Pasadena, California	Winner
Top Chef: D.C. (Season 7)	John Somerville	42	Detroit, Michigan	West Bloomfield, Michigan	17th
Top Chef: D.C. (Season 7)	Jacqueline Lombard	33	Boston, Massachusetts	Brooklyn, New York	16th
Top Chef: D.C. (Season 7)	Tracey Bloom	33	Rochester, New York	Atlanta, Georgia	15th
Top Chef: D.C. (Season 7)	Lynne Gigliotti	51	Philadelphia, Pennsylvania	Hyde Park, New York	13th
Top Chef: D.C. (Season 7)	Arnold Myint	32	Nashville, Tennessee	Nashville, Tennessee	13th
Top Chef: D.C. (Season 7)	Tim Dean	39	Washington, D.C.	Baltimore, Maryland	12th
Top Chef: D.C. (Season 7)	Tamesha Warren	24	Barbados	Washington, D.C.	11th
Top Chef: D.C. (Season 7)	Andrea Curto-Randazzo	39	Vero Beach, Florida	Miami, Florida	10th
Top Chef: D.C. (Season 7)	Stephen Hopcraft	40	Cleveland, Ohio	Las Vegas, Nevada	9th
Top Chef: D.C. (Season 7)	Kenny Gilbert	36	Euclid, Ohio	Telluride, Colorado	8th
Top Chef: D.C. (Season 7)	Alex Reznik	33	Brooklyn, New York	Hollywood, California	7th
Top Chef: D.C. (Season 7)	Amanda Baumgarten	27	Los Angeles, California	Los Angeles, California	6th
Top Chef: D.C. (Season 7)	Tiffany Derry	26	Beaumont, Texas	Dallas, Texas	5th
Top Chef: D.C. (Season 7)	Kelly Liken	33	Pittsburgh, Pennsylvania	Vail, Colorado	4th
Top Chef: D.C. (Season 7)	Angelo Sosa	34	Durham, Connecticut	New York, New York	Runner-up
Top Chef: D.C. (Season 7)	Ed Cotton	34	Boston, Massachusetts	Queens, New York	Runner-up
Top Chef: D.C. (Season 7)	Kevin Sbraga	30	Willingboro, New Jersey	Willingboro, New Jersey	Winner
Top Chef: All-Stars (Season 8)	Elia Aboumrad	27	Mexico City, Mexico	Los Angeles, California	18th
Top Chef: All-Stars (Season 8)	Jennifer Carroll	35	Philadelphia, Pennsylvania	Philadelphia, Pennsylvania	17th
Top Chef: All-Stars (Season 8)	Stephen Asprinio	29	West Palm Beach, Florida	New York, New York	15th
Top Chef: All-Stars (Season 8)	Dale Levitski	37	Chicago, Illinois	Chicago, Illinois	15th
Top Chef: All-Stars (Season 8)	Spike Mendelsohn	29	Clearwater Beach, Florida	Washington, D.C.	14th
Top Chef: All-Stars (Season 8)	Casey Thompson	32	Cedar Hill, Texas	Fort Worth, Texas	13th
Top Chef: All-Stars (Season 8)	Tiffani Faison	33	Bremerhaven, Germany	Boston, Massachusetts	11th
Top Chef: All-Stars (Season 8)	Jamie Lauren	32	New York, New York	Los Angeles, California	11th
Top Chef: All-Stars (Season 8)	Marcel Vigneron	30	Bainbridge Island, Washington	Los Angeles, California	10th
Top Chef: All-Stars (Season 8)	Tre Wilcox	34	Duncanville, Texas	Dallas, Texas	9th
Top Chef: All-Stars (Season 8)	Fabio Viviani	32	Florence, Italy	Moorpark, California	8th
Top Chef: All-Stars (Season 8)	Angelo Sosa	35	Durham, Connecticut	New York, New York	7th
Top Chef: All-Stars (Season 8)	Dale Talde	32	Chicago, Illinois	New York, New York	6th
Top Chef: All-Stars (Season 8)	Carla Hall	46	Nashville, Tennessee	Washington, D.C.	5th
Top Chef: All-Stars (Season 8)	Tiffany Derry	27	Beaumont, Texas	Dallas, Texas	4th
Top Chef: All-Stars (Season 8)	Antonia Lofaso	34	Los Angeles, California	Los Angeles, California	3rd
Top Chef: All-Stars (Season 8)	Mike Isabella	35	Little Ferry, New Jersey	Washington, D.C.	Runner-up
Top Chef: All-Stars (Season 8)	Richard Blais	38	Uniondale, New York	Atlanta, Georgia	Winner
Top Chef: Texas (Season 9)	Tyler Stone	22	—N/a	Sacramento, California	N/A (Note: The contestant was eliminated during the qualifying rounds of the competition.)
Top Chef: Texas (Season 9)	Simon Pantet	30	—N/a	Seattle, Washington	N/A
Top Chef: Texas (Season 9)	Colin Patterson	37	—N/a	Seattle, Washington	N/A
Top Chef: Texas (Season 9)	Nina Vicente	29	—N/a	Seattle, Washington	N/A
Top Chef: Texas (Season 9)	Kimberly Calichio	27	—N/a	New York, New York	N/A
Top Chef: Texas (Season 9)	Jonathan Baltazar	36	—N/a	Long Beach, California	N/A
Top Chef: Texas (Season 9)	Chaz Brown	29	—N/a	New York, New York	N/A
Top Chef: Texas (Season 9)	Berenice DeAraujo	33	—N/a	New York, New York	N/A
Top Chef: Texas (Season 9)	Ashley Villaluz	25	—N/a	Seattle, Washington	N/A
Top Chef: Texas (Season 9)	Molly Brandt	30	—N/a	Hollywood, Florida	N/A
Top Chef: Texas (Season 9)	Laurent Quenioux	51	—N/a	Los Angeles, California	N/A
Top Chef: Texas (Season 9)	Janine Falvo	37	—N/a	Atlanta, Georgia	N/A
Top Chef: Texas (Season 9)	Andrew Curren	32	—N/a	Austin, Texas	N/A
Top Chef: Texas (Season 9)	Keith Rhodes	39	Wilmington, North Carolina	Wilmington, North Carolina	16th
Top Chef: Texas (Season 9)	Richie Farina	28	Riverview, Florida	Chicago, Illinois	15th
Top Chef: Texas (Season 9)	Chuy Valencia	25	Santa Rosa, California	Chicago, Illinois	14th
Top Chef: Texas (Season 9)	Whitney Otawka	30	Hesperia, California	Athens, Georgia	13th
Top Chef: Texas (Season 9)	Dakota Weiss	35	Quartz Hill, California	Los Angeles, California	11th
Top Chef: Texas (Season 9)	Nyesha Arrington	28	Los Angeles, California	Los Angeles, California	11th
Top Chef: Texas (Season 9)	Heather Terhune	39	St. Albans, Vermont	Chicago, Illinois	10th
Top Chef: Texas (Season 9)	Chris Crary	29	Bucyrus, Ohio	Los Angeles, California	9th
Top Chef: Texas (Season 9)	Ty-Lör Boring	34	Kansas City, Missouri	Brooklyn, New York	8th
Top Chef: Texas (Season 9)	Chris Jones	30	Fort Lauderdale, Florida	Chicago, Illinois	7th
Top Chef: Texas (Season 9)	Grayson Schmitz	28	New Holstein, Wisconsin	New York, New York	6th
Top Chef: Texas (Season 9)	Edward Lee	28	Brooklyn, New York	Louisville, Kentucky	5th
Top Chef: Texas (Season 9)	Beverly Kim	32	Downers Grove, Illinois	Chicago, Illinois	4th
Top Chef: Texas (Season 9)	Lindsay Autry	29	Fayetteville, North Carolina	West Palm Beach, Florida	3rd
Top Chef: Texas (Season 9)	Sarah Grueneberg	29	Houston, Texas	Chicago, Illinois	Runner-up
Top Chef: Texas (Season 9)	Paul Qui	31	Springfield, Virginia/Houston, Texas	Austin, Texas	Winner
Top Chef: Seattle (Season 10)	Anthony Gray	35	Macon, Georgia	Atlanta, Georgia	N/A
Top Chef: Seattle (Season 10)	Jorel Pierce	28	Denver, Colorado	Denver, Colorado	N/A
Top Chef: Seattle (Season 10)	Tina Bourbeau	42	New York, New York	New York, New York	N/A
Top Chef: Seattle (Season 10)	Stephanie Cmar	27	Boston, Massachusetts	Boston, Massachusetts	N/A
Top Chef: Seattle (Season 10)	Gina Keatley	32	Boston, Massachusetts	Harlem, New York	N/A
Top Chef: Seattle (Season 10)	Daniel O'Brien	32	Clarkson, New York	Washington, D.C.	N/A
Top Chef: Seattle (Season 10)	Jeffrey Jew	34	Washington, D.C.	St. Petersburg, Florida	18th
Top Chef: Seattle (Season 10)	Kuniko Yagi	35	Maebashi, Japan	Los Angeles, California	17th
Top Chef: Seattle (Season 10)	Chrissy Camba	31	Chicago, Illinois	Chicago, Illinois	15th
Top Chef: Seattle (Season 10)	Carla Pellegrino	43	Rio de Janeiro, Brazil	Las Vegas, Nevada	15th
Top Chef: Seattle (Season 10)	Tyler Wiard	41	Denver, Colorado	Denver, Colorado	13th
Top Chef: Seattle (Season 10)	Chris "CJ" Jacobson	36	El Toro, California	Studio City, California	13th
Top Chef: Seattle (Season 10)	Eliza Gavin	38	Telluride, Colorado	Telluride, Colorado	12th
Top Chef: Seattle (Season 10)	Danyele McPherson	31	Waynesville, North Carolina	Dallas, Texas	11th
Top Chef: Seattle (Season 10)	Bart Vandaele	42	Roeselare, Belgium	Washington, D.C.	10th
Top Chef: Seattle (Season 10)	John Tesar	54	New York, New York	Dallas, Texas	9th
Top Chef: Seattle (Season 10)	Micah Fields	28	Los Angeles, California	Los Angeles, California	8th
Top Chef: Seattle (Season 10)	Josie Smith-Malave	37	Miami, Florida	San Francisco, California	7th
Top Chef: Seattle (Season 10)	Stefan Richter	40	Tampere, Finland	Santa Monica, California	6th
Top Chef: Seattle (Season 10)	Elizabeth "Lizzie" Binder	37	Durban, South Africa	San Francisco, California	5th
Top Chef: Seattle (Season 10)	Josh Valentine	33	Del City, Oklahoma	Dallas, Texas	4th
Top Chef: Seattle (Season 10)	Sheldon Simeon	30	Hilo, Hawaii	Lahaina, Hawaii	3rd
Top Chef: Seattle (Season 10)	Brooke Williamson	34	Los Angeles, California	Redondo Beach, California	Runner-up
Top Chef: Seattle (Season 10)	Kristen Kish	28	Kentwood, Michigan	Boston, Massachusetts	Winner
Top Chef: New Orleans (Season 11)	Benoit Angulo	—N/a	—N/a	New Orleans, Louisiana	N/A
Top Chef: New Orleans (Season 11)	Tres Barnard	—N/a	—N/a	New Orleans, Louisiana	N/A
Top Chef: New Orleans (Season 11)	Bart Bell	—N/a	—N/a	New Orleans, Louisiana	N/A
Top Chef: New Orleans (Season 11)	Michael Doyle	—N/a	—N/a	New Orleans, Louisiana	N/A
Top Chef: New Orleans (Season 11)	Nick Lama	—N/a	—N/a	New Orleans, Louisiana	N/A
Top Chef: New Orleans (Season 11)	Bradley McGehee	—N/a	—N/a	New Orleans, Louisiana	N/A
Top Chef: New Orleans (Season 11)	Casey Morvant	—N/a	—N/a	New Orleans, Louisiana	N/A
Top Chef: New Orleans (Season 11)	Chris Wadsworth	—N/a	—N/a	New Orleans, Louisiana	N/A
Top Chef: New Orleans (Season 11)	Ramon Bojorquez	31	Rio Rico, Arizona	San Diego, California	19th
Top Chef: New Orleans (Season 11)	Jason Cichonski	27	Bucks County, Pennsylvania	Philadelphia, Pennsylvania	18th
Top Chef: New Orleans (Season 11)	Aaron Cuschieri	29	Livonia, Michigan	Chicago, Illinois	17th
Top Chef: New Orleans (Season 11)	Bret Pelaggi	34	Norwood, Massachusetts	Miami, Florida	16th
Top Chef: New Orleans (Season 11)	Janine Booth	25	Perth, Australia	New York, New York	15th
Top Chef: New Orleans (Season 11)	Michael Sichel	46	Valhalla, New York	New Orleans, Louisiana	14th
Top Chef: New Orleans (Season 11)	Benedetto "Bene" Bartolotta	27	Astoria, New York	New York, New York	13th
Top Chef: New Orleans (Season 11)	Patricia "Patty" Vega	29	Gurabo, Puerto Rico	New York, New York	12th
Top Chef: New Orleans (Season 11)	Sara Johannes	36	Milwaukee, Wisconsin	Minneapolis, Minnesota	11th
Top Chef: New Orleans (Season 11)	Travis Masar	27	La Junta, Colorado	Philadelphia, Pennsylvania	10th
Top Chef: New Orleans (Season 11)	Justin Devillier	32	Dana Point, California	New Orleans, Louisiana	9th
Top Chef: New Orleans (Season 11)	Carrie Mashaney	35	Carpenter, Iowa	Seattle, Washington	8th
Top Chef: New Orleans (Season 11)	Stephanie Cmar	28	Boston, Massachusetts	Boston, Massachusetts	7th
Top Chef: New Orleans (Season 11)	Brian Huskey	32	Pasadena, California	Los Angeles, California	6th
Top Chef: New Orleans (Season 11)	Carlos Gaytán	42	Huitzuco, Guerrero, Mexico	Chicago, Illinois	5th
Top Chef: New Orleans (Season 11)	Louis Maldonado	32	Ukiah, California	Healdsburg, California	3rd
Top Chef: New Orleans (Season 11)	Shirley Chung	36	Beijing, China	Fremont, California	3rd
Top Chef: New Orleans (Season 11)	Nina Compton	34	Saint Lucia	New Orleans, Louisiana	Runner-up
Top Chef: New Orleans (Season 11)	Nicholas Elmi	32	West Newbury, Massachusetts	Philadelphia, Pennsylvania	Winner
Top Chef: Boston (Season 12)	Michael Patlazhan	31	Brooklyn, New York	Brooklyn, New York	16th
Top Chef: Boston (Season 12)	Joy Crump	46	Coatesville, Pennsylvania	Fredericksburg, Virginia	15th
Top Chef: Boston (Season 12)	Ron Eyester	40	Long Island, New York	Atlanta, Georgia	14th
Top Chef: Boston (Season 12)	Rebecca LaMalfa	32	Chico, California	Chicago, Illinois	12th
Top Chef: Boston (Season 12)	James Rigato	29	Howell, Michigan	White Lake, Michigan	12th
Top Chef: Boston (Season 12)	Aaron Grissom	27	Tacoma, Washington	North Hollywood, California	11th
Top Chef: Boston (Season 12)	Stacy Cogswell	33	Boston, Massachusetts	Boston, Massachusetts	10th
Top Chef: Boston (Season 12)	Keriann Von Raesfeld	28	San Jose, California	San Jose, California	9th
Top Chef: Boston (Season 12)	Katie Weinner	35	Rosemount, Minnesota	Salt Lake City, Utah	8th
Top Chef: Boston (Season 12)	Adam Harvey	29	New York, New York	New York, New York	7th
Top Chef: Boston (Season 12)	Katsuji Tanabe	33	Mexico City, Mexico	Los Angeles, California	6th
Top Chef: Boston (Season 12)	George Pagonis	31	Washington, D.C.	Washington, D.C.	5th
Top Chef: Boston (Season 12)	Melissa King	30	Los Angeles, California	San Francisco, California	4th
Top Chef: Boston (Season 12)	Doug Adams	29	Tyler, Texas	Portland, Oregon	3rd
Top Chef: Boston (Season 12)	Gregory Gourdet	39	Queens, New York	Portland, Oregon	Runner-Up
Top Chef: Boston (Season 12)	Mei Lin	28	Dearborn, Michigan	Los Angeles, California	Winner
Top Chef: California (Season 13)	Garret Fleming	33	Rockford, Illinois	Washington, D.C.	17th
Top Chef: California (Season 13)	Renee Kelly	34	Shawnee, Kansas	Merriam, Kansas	16th
Top Chef: California (Season 13)	Frances Tariga-Weshnak	33	Manila, Philippines	New York, New York	15th
Top Chef: California (Season 13)	Grayson Schmitz	32	New Holstein, Wisconsin	New York, New York	14th
Top Chef: California (Season 13)	Giselle Wellman	31	San Diego, California	Los Angeles, California	13th
Top Chef: California (Season 13)	Angelina Bastidas	25	Miami, Florida	Miami, Florida	12th
Top Chef: California (Season 13)	Wesley True	38	Mobile, Alabama	Atlanta, Georgia	11th
Top Chef: California (Season 13)	Jason Stratton	35	Seattle, Washington	Seattle, Washington	10th
Top Chef: California (Season 13)	Chad White	32	Spokane, Washington	San Diego, California	9th
Top Chef: California (Season 13)	Phillip Frankland Lee	28	Los Angeles, California	Los Angeles, California	8th
Top Chef: California (Season 13)	Karen Akunowicz	37	Kearny, New Jersey	Boston, Massachusetts	7th
Top Chef: California (Season 13)	Kwame Onwuachi	25	The Bronx, New York	Washington, D.C.	6th
Top Chef: California (Season 13)	Carl Dooley	30	Boston, Massachusetts	Boston, Massachusetts	5th
Top Chef: California (Season 13)	Isaac Toups	36	Rayne, Louisiana	New Orleans, Louisiana	3rd
Top Chef: California (Season 13)	Marjorie Meek-Bradley	30	Ukiah, California	Washington, D.C.	3rd
Top Chef: California (Season 13)	Amar Santana	33	Queens, New York	Orange County, California	Runner-up
Top Chef: California (Season 13)	Jeremy Ford	30	Jacksonville, Florida	Miami, Florida	Winner
Top Chef: Charleston (Season 14)	Gerald Sombright	—N/a	St. Louis, Missouri	Marco Island, Florida	16th
Top Chef: Charleston (Season 14)	Annie Pettry	—N/a	Asheville, North Carolina	Louisville, Kentucky	15th
Top Chef: Charleston (Season 14)	Sam Talbot	—	Charlotte, North Carolina	Brooklyn, New York	14th
Top Chef: Charleston (Season 14)	Robert "BJ" Smith	—N/a	South Bend, Indiana	Portland, Oregon	13th
Top Chef: Charleston (Season 14)	Silvia Barban	—N/a	Castronno, Varese, Italy	Brooklyn, New York	12th
Top Chef: Charleston (Season 14)	Amanda Baumgarten	—	Los Angeles, California	Chicago, Illinois	11th
Top Chef: Charleston (Season 14)	Jim Smith	—N/a	Troy, Alabama	Montgomery, Alabama	10th
Top Chef: Charleston (Season 14)	Jamie Lynch	—N/a	Rochester, New York	Charlotte, North Carolina	9th
Top Chef: Charleston (Season 14)	Katsuji Tanabe	—	Mexico City, Mexico	Los Angeles, California	8th
Top Chef: Charleston (Season 14)	Emily Hahn	—N/a	Lynchburg, Virginia	Charleston, South Carolina	7th
Top Chef: Charleston (Season 14)	Casey Thompson	—	Cedar Hill, Texas	Napa Valley, California	6th
Top Chef: Charleston (Season 14)	Sylva Senat	—N/a	Port-au-Prince, Haiti	Philadelphia, Pennsylvania	5th
Top Chef: Charleston (Season 14)	John Tesar	—	New York, New York	Dallas, Texas	4th
Top Chef: Charleston (Season 14)	Sheldon Simeon	—	Hilo, Hawaii	Maui, Hawaii	3rd
Top Chef: Charleston (Season 14)	Shirley Chung	—	Beijing, China	Irvine, California	Runner-up
Top Chef: Charleston (Season 14)	Brooke Williamson	—	Los Angeles, California	Los Angeles, California	Winner
Top Chef: Colorado (Season 15)	Jennifer Carroll	—	—	Washington, D.C.	N/A (Note: The contestant started in the Last Chance Kitchen but did not earn a spot in the main competition.)
Top Chef: Colorado (Season 15)	Marcel Vigneron	—	—	Los Angeles, California	N/A
Top Chef: Colorado (Season 15)	Kwame Onwuachi	—	—	Washington, D.C.	N/A
Top Chef: Colorado (Season 15)	Melissa Perfit	—N/a	—N/a	San Francisco, California	16th
Top Chef: Colorado (Season 15)	Laura Cole	—N/a	—N/a	Denali National Park, Alaska	15th
Top Chef: Colorado (Season 15)	Rogelio Garcia	—N/a	—N/a	San Francisco, California	14th
Top Chef: Colorado (Season 15)	Tyler Anderson	—N/a	—N/a	Simsbury, Connecticut	13th
Top Chef: Colorado (Season 15)	Tu David Phu	—N/a	—N/a	Oakland, California	12th
Top Chef: Colorado (Season 15)	Lee Anne Wong	—	—	Honolulu, Hawaii	11th
Top Chef: Colorado (Season 15)	Brother Luck	—N/a	—N/a	Colorado Springs, Colorado	10th
Top Chef: Colorado (Season 15)	Tanya Holland	—N/a	—N/a	Oakland, California	9th
Top Chef: Colorado (Season 15)	Claudette Zepeda-Wilkins	—N/a	—N/a	San Diego, California	8th
Top Chef: Colorado (Season 15)	Fatima Ali	—N/a	—N/a	New York, New York	7th
Top Chef: Colorado (Season 15)	Bruce Kalman	—N/a	—N/a	Los Angeles, California	6th
Top Chef: Colorado (Season 15)	Chris Scott	—N/a	—N/a	Brooklyn, New York	5th
Top Chef: Colorado (Season 15)	Carrie Baird	—N/a	—N/a	Denver, Colorado	4th
Top Chef: Colorado (Season 15)	Joe Sasto	—N/a	—N/a	Los Angeles, California	3rd
Top Chef: Colorado (Season 15)	Adrienne Cheatham	—N/a	—N/a	New York, New York	Runner-up
Top Chef: Colorado (Season 15)	Joe Flamm	—N/a	—N/a	Chicago, Illinois	Winner
Top Chef: Kentucky (Season 16)	Jim Smith	—	—	Montgomery, Alabama	N/A
Top Chef: Kentucky (Season 16)	Carrie Baird	—	—	Denver, Colorado	N/A
Top Chef: Kentucky (Season 16)	Caitlin Steininger	—N/a	—N/a	Cincinnati, Ohio	16th
Top Chef: Kentucky (Season 16)	Natalie Maronski	—N/a	—N/a	Philadelphia, Pennsylvania	15th
Top Chef: Kentucky (Season 16)	Kevin Scharpf	—N/a	—N/a	Dubuque, Iowa	14th
Top Chef: Kentucky (Season 16)	Pablo Lamon	—N/a	—N/a	Miami Beach, Florida	12th
Top Chef: Kentucky (Season 16)	Nini Nguyen	—N/a	—N/a	Brooklyn, New York	12th
Top Chef: Kentucky (Season 16)	Brother Luck	—	—	Colorado Springs, Colorado	11th
Top Chef: Kentucky (Season 16)	Brandon Rosen	—N/a	—N/a	San Mateo, California	10th
Top Chef: Kentucky (Season 16)	Brian Young	—N/a	—N/a	Boston, Massachusetts	9th
Top Chef: Kentucky (Season 16)	David Viana	—N/a	—N/a	Asbury Park, New Jersey	8th
Top Chef: Kentucky (Season 16)	Edmund "Eddie" Konrad	—N/a	—N/a	Philadelphia, Pennsylvania	7th
Top Chef: Kentucky (Season 16)	Justin Sutherland	—N/a	—N/a	St. Paul, Minnesota	6th
Top Chef: Kentucky (Season 16)	Adrienne Wright	—N/a	—N/a	Boston, Massachusetts	5th
Top Chef: Kentucky (Season 16)	Michelle Minori	—N/a	—N/a	San Francisco, California	4th
Top Chef: Kentucky (Season 16)	Eric Adjepong	—N/a	—N/a	Washington, D.C.	3rd
Top Chef: Kentucky (Season 16)	Sara Bradley	—N/a	—N/a	Paducah, Kentucky	Runner-up
Top Chef: Kentucky (Season 16)	Kelsey Barnard Clark	—N/a	—N/a	Dothan, Alabama	Winner
Top Chef: All-Stars L.A. (Season 17)	Joe Sasto	—	—	Los Angeles, California	15th
Top Chef: All-Stars L.A. (Season 17)	Angelo Sosa	—	—	San Diego, California	14th
Top Chef: All-Stars L.A. (Season 17)	Jamie Lynch	—	—	Charlotte, North Carolina	13th
Top Chef: All-Stars L.A. (Season 17)	Lisa Fernandes	—	—	Brooklyn, New York	12th
Top Chef: All-Stars L.A. (Season 17)	Jennifer Carroll	—	—	Philadelphia, Pennsylvania/Washington, D.C.	11th
Top Chef: All-Stars L.A. (Season 17)	Nini Nguyen	—	—	New York, New York	10th
Top Chef: All-Stars L.A. (Season 17)	Eric Adjepong	—	—	Washington, D.C.	9th
Top Chef: All-Stars L.A. (Season 17)	Lee Anne Wong	—	—	Maui, Hawaii	8th
Top Chef: All-Stars L.A. (Season 17)	Karen Akunowicz	—	—	Boston, Massachusetts	7th
Top Chef: All-Stars L.A. (Season 17)	Brian Malarkey	—	—	San Diego, California	6th
Top Chef: All-Stars L.A. (Season 17)	Gregory Gourdet	—	—	Portland, Oregon	5th
Top Chef: All-Stars L.A. (Season 17)	Kevin Gillespie	—	—	Atlanta, Georgia	4th
Top Chef: All-Stars L.A. (Season 17)	Stephanie Cmar	—	—	Boston, Massachusetts	Runner-up
Top Chef: All-Stars L.A. (Season 17)	Bryan Voltaggio	—	—	Frederick, Maryland	Runner-up
Top Chef: All-Stars L.A. (Season 17)	Melissa King	—	—	San Francisco, California	Winner
Top Chef: Portland (Season 18)	Roscoe Hall	—N/a	Chicago, Illinois	Birmingham, Alabama	15th
Top Chef: Portland (Season 18)	Sasha Grumman	—N/a	Newport Beach, California	Houston, Texas	14th
Top Chef: Portland (Season 18)	Brittanny Anderson	—N/a	Richmond, Virginia	Richmond, Virginia	13th
Top Chef: Portland (Season 18)	Kiki Louya	—N/a	Detroit, Michigan	Detroit, Michigan	12th
Top Chef: Portland (Season 18)	Nelson German	—N/a	New York, New York	Oakland, California	10th
Top Chef: Portland (Season 18)	Gabriel Pascuzzi	—N/a	Portland, Oregon	Portland, Oregon	10th
Top Chef: Portland (Season 18)	Avishar Barua	—N/a	Columbus, Ohio	Columbus, Ohio	9th
Top Chef: Portland (Season 18)	Sara Hauman	—N/a	Vista, California	Portland, Oregon	8th
Top Chef: Portland (Season 18)	Chris Viaud	—N/a	Randolph, Massachusetts	Milford, New Hampshire	7th
Top Chef: Portland (Season 18)	Byron Gomez	—N/a	Central Islip, New York	Aspen, Colorado	6th
Top Chef: Portland (Season 18)	Maria Mazon	—N/a	Tucson, Arizona/Navojoa, Sonora, Mexico	Tucson, Arizona	5th
Top Chef: Portland (Season 18)	Jamie Tran	—N/a	Stockton, California	Las Vegas, Nevada	4th
Top Chef: Portland (Season 18)	Dawn Burrell	—N/a	Philadelphia, Pennsylvania	Houston, Texas	Runner-up
Top Chef: Portland (Season 18)	Shota Nakajima	—N/a	Tokyo, Japan/Seattle, Washington	Seattle, Washington	Runner-up
Top Chef: Portland (Season 18)	Gabe Erales	—N/a	El Paso, Texas	Austin, Texas	Winner
Top Chef: Houston (Season 19)	Leia Gaccione	—N/a	Passaic, New Jersey	Morristown, New Jersey	15th
Top Chef: Houston (Season 19)	Stephanie Miller	—N/a	Bismarck, North Dakota	Bismarck, North Dakota	14th
Top Chef: Houston (Season 19)	Sam Kang	—N/a	Gardena, California	Brooklyn, New York	13th
Top Chef: Houston (Season 19)	Robert Hernandez	—N/a	Downey, California	San Francisco, California	12th
Top Chef: Houston (Season 19)	Monique Feybesse	—N/a	San Francisco, California	Vallejo, California	11th
Top Chef: Houston (Season 19)	Jo Chan	—N/a	Palmdale, California	Austin, Texas	10th
Top Chef: Houston (Season 19)	Jackson Kalb	—N/a	Los Angeles, California	Los Angeles, California	9th
Top Chef: Houston (Season 19)	Luke Kolpin	—N/a	Seattle, Washington	Seattle, Washington	8th
Top Chef: Houston (Season 19)	Jae Jung	—N/a	Seoul, South Korea	New York, New York	7th
Top Chef: Houston (Season 19)	Ashleigh Shanti	—N/a	Virginia Beach, Virginia	Asheville, North Carolina	6th
Top Chef: Houston (Season 19)	Nick Wallace	—N/a	Edwards, Mississippi	Jackson, Mississippi	5th
Top Chef: Houston (Season 19)	Damarr Brown	—N/a	Chicago, Illinois	Chicago, Illinois	4th
Top Chef: Houston (Season 19)	Sarah Welch	—N/a	Ann Arbor, Michigan	Detroit, Michigan	Runner-up
Top Chef: Houston (Season 19)	Evelyn Garcia	—N/a	Houston, Texas	Houston, Texas	Runner-up
Top Chef: Houston (Season 19)	Buddha Lo	—N/a	Port Douglas, Australia	Brooklyn, New York	Winner
Top Chef: World All-Stars (Season 20)	Samuel Albert	—N/a	Soucelles, France	Angers, France	16th
Top Chef: World All-Stars (Season 20)	Dawn Burrell	—	Philadelphia, Pennsylvania	Houston, Texas	15th
Top Chef: World All-Stars (Season 20)	Phattanant "May" Thongthong	—N/a	Chiang Mai, Thailand	Bangkok, Thailand	14th
Top Chef: World All-Stars (Season 20)	Luciana Berry	—N/a	Salvador, Bahia, Brazil	London, England	13th
Top Chef: World All-Stars (Season 20)	Begoña Rodrigo	—N/a	Valencia, Spain	Valencia, Spain	12th
Top Chef: World All-Stars (Season 20)	Sylwia Stachyra	—N/a	Lublin, Poland	Lublin, Poland	11th
Top Chef: World All-Stars (Season 20)	Dale MacKay	—N/a	Saskatoon, Saskatchewan	Saskatoon, Saskatchewan	10th
Top Chef: World All-Stars (Season 20)	Charbel Hayek	—N/a	Beirut, Lebanon	Lake Worth, Florida	9th
Top Chef: World All-Stars (Season 20)	Nicole Gomes	—N/a	Richmond, British Columbia	Vancouver, British Columbia	8th
Top Chef: World All-Stars (Season 20)	Victoire Gouloubi	—N/a	Brazzaville, Republic of the Congo	Milan, Italy	7th
Top Chef: World All-Stars (Season 20)	Amar Santana	—	Dominican Republic/Queens, New York	Santa Ana, California	6th
Top Chef: World All-Stars (Season 20)	Tom Goetter	—N/a	Mainz, Germany	Worldwide aboard Scenic ocean vessels	5th
Top Chef: World All-Stars (Season 20)	Ali Ghzawi	—N/a	Irbid, Jordan	Amman, Jordan	4th
Top Chef: World All-Stars (Season 20)	Gabriel "Gabri" Rodriguez	—N/a	Iztapalapa, Mexico City	Madrid, Spain	Runner-up
Top Chef: World All-Stars (Season 20)	Sara Bradley	—	Paducah, Kentucky	Paducah, Kentucky	Runner-up
Top Chef: World All-Stars (Season 20)	Buddha Lo	—	Port Douglas, Australia	Brooklyn, New York	Winner
Top Chef: Wisconsin (Season 21)	David Murphy	—N/a	Houston, Texas	San Francisco, California	16th
Top Chef: Wisconsin (Season 21)	Valentine Howell Jr.	—N/a	Boston, Massachusetts	Dorchester, Massachusetts	15th
Top Chef: Wisconsin (Season 21)	Kenny Nguyen	—N/a	Philadelphia, Pennsylvania	Athens, Georgia	14th
Top Chef: Wisconsin (Season 21)	Alisha Elenz	—N/a	Palatine, Illinois	Chicago, Illinois	13th
Top Chef: Wisconsin (Season 21)	Charly Pierre	—N/a	Cambridge, Massachusetts	New Orleans, Louisiana	12th
Top Chef: Wisconsin (Season 21)	Rasika Venkatesa	—N/a	Chennai, India	New York, New York	11th
Top Chef: Wisconsin (Season 21)	Kévin D'Andrea	—N/a	Oloron-Sainte-Marie, France	Austin, Texas	10th
Top Chef: Wisconsin (Season 21)	Kaleena Bliss	—N/a	Seattle, Washington	Chicago, Illinois	9th
Top Chef: Wisconsin (Season 21)	Amanda Turner	—N/a	Arlington, Texas	Austin, Texas	8th
Top Chef: Wisconsin (Season 21)	Soo Ahn	—N/a	Seoul, South Korea/Tacoma, Washington	Chicago, Illinois	7th
Top Chef: Wisconsin (Season 21)	Michelle Wallace	—N/a	St. Louis, Missouri	Houston, Texas	6th
Top Chef: Wisconsin (Season 21)	Manny Barella	—N/a	Monterrey, Nuevo León, Mexico	Denver, Colorado	5th
Top Chef: Wisconsin (Season 21)	Laura Ozyilmaz	—N/a	Acapulco, Mexico	San Francisco, California	4th
Top Chef: Wisconsin (Season 21)	Savannah Miller	—N/a	Southern Pines, North Carolina	Durham, North Carolina	Runner-up
Top Chef: Wisconsin (Season 21)	Dan Jacobs	—N/a	Chicago, Illinois	Milwaukee, Wisconsin	Runner-up
Top Chef: Wisconsin (Season 21)	Danny Garcia	—N/a	Brooklyn, New York	Brooklyn, New York	Winner
Top Chef: Destination Canada (Season 22)	Ying Gao	—N/a	Beijing, China	Whistler, British Columbia	N/A
Top Chef: Destination Canada (Season 22)	Sam Olayinka	—N/a	Ottawa, Ontario	Vancouver, British Columbia	N/A
Top Chef: Destination Canada (Season 22)	Mimi Weissenborn	—N/a	Frederick, Maryland	Portland, Maine	15th
Top Chef: Destination Canada (Season 22)	Anya El-Wattar	—N/a	Moscow, Russia	San Francisco, California	14th
Top Chef: Destination Canada (Season 22)	Zubair Mohajir	—N/a	Chennai, India	Chicago, Illinois	13th
Top Chef: Destination Canada (Season 22)	Kat Turner	—N/a	Sturgeon Bay, Wisconsin	Los Angeles, California	11th
Top Chef: Destination Canada (Season 22)	Corwin Hemming	—N/a	Augusta, Georgia	Brooklyn, New York	11th
Top Chef: Destination Canada (Season 22)	Katianna Hong	—N/a	Clifton Park, New York	Los Angeles, California	10th
Top Chef: Destination Canada (Season 22)	Henry Lu	—N/a	The Bronx, New York	Houston, Texas	9th
Top Chef: Destination Canada (Season 22)	Paula Endara	—N/a	Quito, Ecuador	Lexington, Kentucky	8th
Top Chef: Destination Canada (Season 22)	Vincenzo "Vinny" Loseto	—N/a	Massapequa, New York	Napa, California	7th
Top Chef: Destination Canada (Season 22)	Lana Lagomarsini	—N/a	The Bronx, New York	Harlem, New York	6th
Top Chef: Destination Canada (Season 22)	Massimo Piedimonte	—N/a	Montréal, Quebec	Montréal, Quebec	5th
Top Chef: Destination Canada (Season 22)	César Murillo	—N/a	Dallas, Texas	Chicago, Illinois	4th
Top Chef: Destination Canada (Season 22)	Bailey Sullivan	—N/a	Chicago, Illinois	Chicago, Illinois	Runner-up
Top Chef: Destination Canada (Season 22)	Shuai Wang	—N/a	Queens, New York	North Charleston, South Carolina	Runner-up
Top Chef: Destination Canada (Season 22)	Tristen Epps-Long	—N/a	Virginia Beach, Virginia	Houston, Texas	Winner
Top Chef: Carolinas (Season 23)	Day Anaїs Joseph	—N/a	Fort Lauderdale, Florida	Atlanta, Georgia	15th
Top Chef: Carolinas (Season 23)	Jaspratap "Jassi" Bindra	—N/a	Kanpur, India	Houston, Texas	14th
Top Chef: Carolinas (Season 23)	Nana Araba Wilmot	—N/a	Cherry Hill, New Jersey	Cherry Hill, New Jersey	13th
Top Chef: Carolinas (Season 23)	Brittany Cochran	—N/a	Columbus, Ohio	Charlotte, North Carolina	12th
Top Chef: Carolinas (Season 23)	Justin Tootla	—N/a	Detroit, Michigan	Suttons Bay, Michigan/Detroit, Michigan	11th
Top Chef: Carolinas (Season 23)	Jennifer Lee Jackson	—N/a	Statham, Georgia	Suttons Bay, Michigan/Detroit, Michigan	10th
Top Chef: Carolinas (Season 23)	Brandon Dearden	—N/a	Sterling, Virginia	Hamilton, Montana	9th
Top Chef: Carolinas (Season 23)	Oscar Diaz	—N/a	Chicago, Illinois	Durham, North Carolina	8th
Top Chef: Carolinas (Season 23)	Duyen Ha	—N/a	Binghamton, New York	Los Angeles, California	7th
Top Chef: Carolinas (Season 23)	Anthony Jones	—N/a	Sunderland, Maryland	Alexandria, Virginia	6th
Top Chef: Carolinas (Season 23)	Sieger Bayer	—N/a	Chicago, Illinois	Chicago, Illinois	5th
Top Chef: Carolinas (Season 23)	Jonathan Dearden	—N/a	Sterling, Virginia	Alexandria, Virginia	4th
Top Chef: Carolinas (Season 23)	Laurence Louie	—N/a	Boston, Massachusetts	Quincy, Massachusetts	Runner-up
Top Chef: Carolinas (Season 23)	Sherry Cardoso	—N/a	Belo Horizonte, Brazil	Brooklyn, New York	Runner-up
Top Chef: Carolinas (Season 23)	Rhoda Magbitang	—N/a	Antipolo, Philippines	Kailua-Kona, Hawaii	Winner
