= Top Chef =

American reality competition TV series

- Genre: Reality competition; Cooking show
- Presented by: Katie Lee; Padma Lakshmi; Kristen Kish
- Starring: Top Chef contestants
- Judges: Tom Colicchio; Gail Simmons; Ted Allen; Toby Young; Eric Ripert; Anthony Bourdain; Hugh Acheson; Emeril Lagasse; Wolfgang Puck; Richard Blais; Graham Elliot; Nilou Motamed
- Country of origin: United States
- Original language: English
- No. of seasons: 23
- No. of episodes: 344 (list of episodes)

Production
- Executive producers: Dan Cutforth; Jane Lipsitz; Casey Kriley
- Running time: 43 – 54 minutes
- Production company: Magical Elves Productions

Original release
- Network: Bravo
- Release: March 8, 2006 – present

Top Chef is an American reality competition television series which premiered on Bravo in March 2006. The show features chefs competing against each other in culinary challenges. The contestants are judged by a panel of professional chefs and other notables from the food and wine industry, with one or more contestants eliminated in each episode. The show is produced by Magical Elves Productions, the company that created Project Runway.

Judges Tom Colicchio and Gail Simmons have been mainstays, joined by various shorter-term and guest judges. The show was hosted by Katie Lee in season 1; by Padma Lakshmi from seasons 2 through 20; and by season 10 winner Kristen Kish, beginning with season 21.

The success of the show has resulted in multiple spin-offs, such as Top Chef Masters, Top Chef: Just Desserts, Top Chef Junior, Top Chef Amateurs, and Top Chef Family Style, as well as Spanish-language spin-offs, including Top Chef Estrellas and Top Chef VIP. Numerous international adaptations of the show have also been produced.

The twenty-third season, Top Chef: Carolinas, aired March–June 2026. In May 2026, the series was renewed for a twenty-fourth season.

== Show format ==
=== Basic format ===
Top Chef is a cooking show that uses a progressive elimination format. The beginning of each season starts with twelve to nineteen professional chefs selected through auditions. The chefs are brought to the season's host city or state, which typically inspires themes throughout the season. The chefs live in a provided apartment, house, or hotel during the season, with limited access to outside communication. In each episode, the chefs participate in a Quickfire Challenge and an Elimination Challenge (described below). The winner of the Quickfire Challenge is typically granted immunity from elimination, a prize, or another benefit for the following Elimination Challenge. As the name suggests, the loser of the Elimination Challenge is eliminated from the competition. This format continues until two or three chefs remain. Each finalist is then challenged to create a full-course meal; the chef with the best meal, as determined by the judges, is declared the "Top Chef". Towards the end of the season, when only four or five chefs remain, the show moves to another location to finish out the competition.

In the Quickfire Challenge, chefs must cook a dish that meets certain requirements (for example, using specific ingredients or inspiring a particular taste) or participate in a culinary-related challenge (for example, a mise en place relay race or a taste testing contest). They are usually given an hour or less to complete these tasks. The Quickfire Challenge traditionally begins with the host saying, "Your time starts now," and ends with the host saying, "Hands up, utensils down." A guest judge selects one or more chefs as the best in the challenge. Early in the season, the winning chef(s) are granted immunity from the episode's Elimination Challenge. As the number of contestants dwindles, immunity is withdrawn, and instead, the winner receives an advantage (such as being the team leader for a team challenge or getting the first pick of ingredients) or a prize (such as chef's knives, wine, or cash). To emphasize the culture and environment of Season 6's Las Vegas setting, the show introduced "High-stakes Quickfire Challenges", which feature extravagant rewards, usually a large cash prize upwards of US$10,000. High-stakes Quickfire Challenges continued onward in further seasons. Season 12 of Top Chef introduced the "Sudden Death Quickfire Challenge", where the chef with the least successful dish faces immediate elimination unless they win a cook-off against another competitor.

In the Elimination Challenge, the chefs prepare one or more dishes to meet the challenge requirements, often including a specific theme, and are usually more complex and require more time to execute than a Quickfire Challenge. Elimination Challenges may be individual challenges or require chefs to work in teams; some may require the contestants to produce several courses. Teams may be selected by the remaining chefs, but are more often determined by a random process such as "drawing knives" from a knife block. The time limit for an Elimination Challenge may range from a few hours to a few days, typically including preparation and planning time. Ingredients for Elimination Challenges generally allow chefs access to the Top Chef pantry and the ingredients they previously purchased at a grocery store within a specified budget and shopping time limit. However, certain challenges may provide specific ingredients or limit the type or number of ingredients used, while others require non-traditional methods for obtaining ingredients (such as asking people door-to-door or fishing). After shopping, the contestants will cook for up to four judges, usually including at least one guest judge. In most cases, the contestants also cook for a group of guest diners.

After the Elimination Challenge, the chefs report to the Judges' Table, where the judges deliberate on their choices for the best and worst dishes. The judges may also consider guests' comments, if available. The top individuals or teams are called in and may be asked questions about their dishes or preparation before they are notified of their placement. One or more chefs are named the winner of the challenge and may be awarded an additional prize by the guest judge. The same procedure is repeated with the poorest performing chefs or teams, after which a similar discussion occurs. From this group, one or more chefs are chosen for elimination, with the host asking the chef(s) to leave by saying, "Please pack your knives and go." This is usually followed by a knife-packing sequence for the eliminated chef(s), with a voice-over of their final thoughts about their performance, at the close of the episode. Contestants are judged strictly on a challenge-by-challenge basis and cumulative performance is not considered. According to the credits, some elimination decisions are made in consultation with the show's producers.

The season winner is awarded a cash prize, a feature in Food & Wine magazine, and an appearance at the Food & Wine Classic in Aspen, Colorado. The prize money was $100,000 for Seasons 1-5. It was increased to $125,000 for Seasons 6-7 and 9-16, with a temporary $200,000 prize for Season 8. It was then permanently increased again to $250,000, beginning with Season 17. Furthermore, a fan vote is held each season to determine the Fan Favorite, which features an additional $10,000 reward.

=== Special formats ===
Midway through each season, the contestants participate in a "Restaurant Wars" (or similarly named) Elimination Challenge. They are split into two teams, created by the previous Quickfire Challenge winner or by drawing knives. In these teams, the chefs must transform an empty space into a functioning pop-up restaurant within a set time limit and budget, selecting and creating the name, theme, décor, and menu. Typically, one team member is designated the role of executive chef, who is responsible for managing the kitchen and expediting food, while another team member is designated as front of house, who is responsible for training the waitstaff and managing the dining room. Various seasons have introduced twists to the standard Restaurant Wars formula. For example, Season 4 featured not only Restaurant Wars, but a "Wedding Wars" challenge as well. Season 16 introduced the challenge much earlier in the season, during its fourth episode, and utilized three teams instead of the usual two. Season 6 and Season 20 allowed chefs to work in an existing restaurant infrastructure, with the latter removing the front of house position in favor of multiple trained servers and a professional maître d'.

In the final Elimination Challenge, the two or three remaining chefs must prepare a multiple-course dinner with the assistance of sous chefs. These sous chefs could be previously eliminated contestants, members of the contestants' families, or celebrity chefs. The winner is selected based on the overall quality of their meal. There is typically no Quickfire Challenge during this episode.

=== Last Chance Kitchen ===
Last Chance Kitchen is a companion web series, introduced in Season 9, that features challenges in which previously eliminated contestants compete for a chance to re-enter the main competition. Each week, two or more chefs compete against each other in the Top Chef kitchen, with the results typically judged alone by Tom Colicchio. Each week's winner moves on to face the next eliminated Top Chef contestant(s), while the loser is eliminated from the competition for good. Initially, only the winner of the final episode of Last Chance Kitchen returned to compete. Beginning with Season 15, the format was changed to allow two chances to re-enter: one mid-season and one closer to the season finale. Season 23 then reverted back to a single opportunity for re-entry.

== Seasons ==
Season	Subtitle	Winner	Runner(s)-up		Fan Favorite	Original air dates
1	San Francisco	Harold Dieterle	Tiffani Faison		N/A	March 8 – May 24, 2006
2	Los Angeles	Ilan Hall	Marcel Vigneron		Sam Talbot	October 18, 2006 – January 31, 2007
3	Miami	Hung Huynh	Dale Levitski	Casey Thompson	Casey Thompson	June 13 – October 13, 2007
4	Chicago	Stephanie Izard	Lisa Fernandes	Richard Blais	Stephanie Izard	March 12 – June 11, 2008
5	New York	Hosea Rosenberg	Stefan Richter	Carla Hall	Fabio Viviani	November 12, 2008 – March 4, 2009
6	Las Vegas	Michael Voltaggio	Bryan Voltaggio	Kevin Gillespie	Kevin Gillespie	August 19 – December 16, 2009
7	D.C.	Kevin Sbraga	Ed Cotton	Angelo Sosa	Tiffany Derry	June 16 – September 15, 2010
8	All-Stars	Richard Blais	Mike Isabella		Carla Hall	December 1, 2010 – April 6, 2011
9	Texas	Paul Qui	Sarah Grueneberg		Chris Crary	November 2, 2011 – March 7, 2012
10	Seattle	Kristen Kish	Brooke Williamson		Sheldon Simeon	November 7, 2012 – February 27, 2013
11	New Orleans	Nicholas Elmi	Nina Compton		Nina Compton	October 2, 2013 – February 5, 2014
12	Boston	Mei Lin	Gregory Gourdet		N/A	October 15, 2014 – February 11, 2015
13	California	Jeremy Ford	Amar Santana		Isaac Toups	December 2, 2015 – March 17, 2016
14	Charleston	Brooke Williamson	Shirley Chung		Sheldon Simeon	December 1, 2016 – March 2, 2017
15	Colorado	Joe Flamm	Adrienne Cheatham		Fatima Ali	December 7, 2017 – March 8, 2018
16	Kentucky	Kelsey Barnard Clark	Sara Bradley		Kelsey Barnard Clark	December 6, 2018 – March 14, 2019
17	All-Stars L.A.	Melissa King	Bryan Voltaggio	Stephanie Cmar	Melissa King	March 19 – June 18, 2020
18	Portland	Gabe Erales	Shota Nakajima	Dawn Burrell	Shota Nakajima	April 1 – July 1, 2021
19	Houston	Buddha Lo	Evelyn Garcia	Sarah Welch	Damarr Brown	March 3 – June 2, 2022
20	World All-Stars	Buddha Lo	Sara Bradley	Gabri Rodriguez	Amar Santana	March 9 – June 8, 2023
21	Wisconsin	Danny Garcia	Dan Jacobs	Savannah Miller	Michelle Wallace	March 20 – June 19, 2024
22	Destination Canada	Tristen Epps-Long	Shuai Wang	Bailey Sullivan	N/A	March 13 – June 12, 2025
23	Carolinas	Rhoda Magbitang	Sherry Cardoso	Laurence Louie	N/A	March 9 – June 8, 2026
24	TBA	TBA	TBA	TBA	TBA	2027

== Production ==
Following the 2003 ratings success of Queer Eye for the Straight Guy, Bravo executives sought to leverage the show's popularity to create new programming based around its five central themes: food, fashion, beauty, interior design, and pop culture. During a meeting with Senior Vice President of Programming Andy Cohen and Vice President of Programming Dave Serwatka, Bravo President Lauren Zalaznick proposed the idea of an elevated food competition, similar to the fashion-focused Project Runway. Magical Elves, the producers of Project Runway, were brought in to helm the new series. Showrunner Shauna Minoprio championed the inclusion of chef Tom Colicchio as head judge, arguing that the competition would need his credibility. Bravo also approached the publisher of Food & Wine magazine about setting up a partnership like the one Project Runway had with Elle, resulting in Gail Simmons joining the cast as a permanent judge.

Before the show was set to film its inaugural season in San Francisco in 2005, producers learned that their first choice for host, Padma Lakshmi, had signed onto the British miniseries Planet Food. They then approached Katie Lee instead. The first season featured competitors with varying levels of experience and qualifications, including a culinary school student and sommelier. Due to the disparity in talent, producers aimed to move away from nonprofessional contestants in the future. Lee was dropped after Season 1, partly because of poor audience reception to her hosting style, and Lakshmi joined the series proper for Season 2 in Los Angeles. From then on, the show would change locations every year, using a new city or region to highlight local cuisine and serve as inspiration for challenges. After Season 20 in 2023, Lakshmi left the series to focus on other projects and was replaced by former Top Chef winner Kristen Kish.

== Spin-offs ==
=== Top Chef Masters (2009–13) ===
Top Chef Masters features established, award-winning chefs, in contrast to Top Chef, which typically features younger, up-and-coming chefs. The series debuted on June 10, 2009, with contestants including Rick Bayless, John Besh, Michael Chiarello, Wylie Dufresne, Jonathan Waxman and Hubert Keller. As of 2013, five seasons have been produced and aired. During its first two seasons, food journalist Kelly Choi hosted the show, while restaurant critic Gael Greene, culinary expert and Saveur editor-in-chief James Oseland, and food critic Jay Rayner served as judges. Beginning with the third season, celebrity chef Curtis Stone replaced Choi as host.

=== Top Chef: Just Desserts (2010–11) ===
Top Chef: Just Desserts is a spin-off of the Top Chef format featuring pastry chefs. Bravo announced the series on October 25, 2009. The show was hosted by Top Chef regular Gail Simmons. The judging panel included pastry chef Johnny Iuzzini, Top Chef Masters finalist Hubert Keller, and DailyCandy's "editor-at-large" Dannielle Kyrillos. The show debuted on Bravo on September 15, 2010, following the seventh season finale of Top Chef. The series was cancelled after two seasons.

=== Top Chef Healthy Showdown (2011) ===
Top Chef Healthy Showdown is a special webisode series aired in 2011 sponsored by Healthy Choice. It featured former Top Chef contestants Sara Nguyen (Season 3), Ryan Scott (Season 4), Casey Thompson (Season 3, Season 8), and Tre Wilcox (Season 3, Season 8) competing in a series of Quickfire Challenges to win $25,000 and inspire a Top Chef line of Healthy Choice entrées. The series was hosted by Curtis Stone; Ryan was declared the winner of the competition.

=== Life After Top Chef (2012) ===
Life After Top Chef is a spin-off featuring former Top Chef contestants Richard Blais, Jennifer Carroll, Spike Mendelsohn, and Fabio Viviani, which focuses on various aspects of their lives, from managing and opening a restaurant to dealing with family dynamics and personal issues. The series premiered on October 3, 2012.

=== Top Chef Estrellas (2014) ===
Top Chef Estrellas is a Spanish-language spin-off featuring Hispanic celebrities competing to win $100,000 for their charity of choice. It was hosted by actress Aylín Mújica and judged by chefs Lorena Garcia, Jaime Martín Del Campo, and Ramiro Arvizu. As part of the adaptation, eliminated celebrities were not sent home, but rather became sous-chefs for the remaining contestants. The series premiered on Telemundo on February 16, 2014.

=== Top Chef Duels (2014) ===
Top Chef Duels brings back contestants from past seasons of Top Chef and Top Chef Masters, pitting them against each other in head-to-head challenges. The winner of each match-up advanced to the season finale, where one chef received $100,000. The series premiered on August 6, 2014.

=== Top Chef Junior (2017–18) ===
Top Chef Junior is a spin-off series originally ordered in 2008 for an eight-episode run on Bravo. The show had never aired, nor is it known if any episodes were produced at that time. However, nine years later, Top Chef Junior was mentioned as part of the initial lineup for Universal Kids, an NBCUniversal-owned children's channel launched on September 9, 2017. The series features young chefs between the ages of 9–14. It was hosted by actress Vanessa Lachey, with Top Chef Masters and Top Chef Duels host Curtis Stone serving as its head judge. The first season of Top Chef Junior premiered on October 13, 2017, and its second season premiered on September 8, 2018.

=== Top Chef Amateurs (2021) ===
Top Chef Amateurs is a spin-off featuring home cooks competing in head-to-head challenges drawn from past seasons of Top Chef. Production of the show began in October 2020 in Portland, Oregon, following the filming of Top Chef: Portland. The series was hosted by Gail Simmons and premiered on July 1, 2021.

=== Top Chef Family Style (2021) ===
Top Chef Family Style is a spin-off featuring young chefs teaming up with adult family members to compete for $100,000. The series was ordered in May 2021 by streaming service Peacock. It is hosted by singer-songwriter Meghan Trainor with Top Chef Masters winner Marcus Samuelsson serving as head judge. The series premiered on September 9, 2021, and episodes from the series made their linear premiere on Bravo in 2022.

=== Top Chef VIP (2022–present) ===
Similar to Top Chef Estrellas, Top Chef VIP is a Spanish-language spin-off featuring Hispanic celebrities competing for $100,000. It is hosted by actress Carmen Villalobos and judged by chefs Antonio de Livier, Adria Marina Montaño and Juan Manuel Barrientos. The series premiered on Telemundo on August 9, 2022.

== Other media ==
=== Top Chef University ===
Top Chef University is a comprehensive online culinary school involving 12 courses and over 200 in-depth video lessons. The program takes participants through a structured program of the basics (knife skills, kitchen set-up, ingredients) to advanced culinary techniques (sous-vide, molecular gastronomy). The instructors at Top Chef University consist of the series' most successful and popular former contestants. Enrollment costs $25 for a monthly membership and $200 for an annual membership.

=== Top Chef: The Game ===
Top Chef: The Game is a computer game released by Brighter Minds for PCs. It challenges players to create the best dish from items in a virtual pantry. Games magazine gave the game an unfavorable review, calling it a "quick cash-in... for an undiscriminating audience."

=== TV dinners ===
To make certain dishes available to viewers who watch Top Chef but do not have time to prepare them, Schwan's Home Service started offering Top Chef-branded frozen meals in late 2009.

=== Cookbooks ===
On March 20, 2008, Chronicle Books released Top Chef: The Cookbook, with a foreword by Tom Colicchio. On September 30, 2009, Chronicle Books released Top Chef: The Quickfire Cookbook, with a foreword by Padma Lakshmi. On July 14, 2010, Chronicle Books released How to Cook Like a Top Chef, with a foreword by Rick Bayless.

== Reception ==
Time magazine's James Poniewozik named Top Chef one of the Top 10 Returning Series of 2007, ranking it at #10. In December 2023, Variety ranked Top Chef #97 on its list of the 100 greatest TV shows of all time.

=== Awards and nominations ===
==== Primetime Emmy Awards ====
Year	Category	Nominee(s)	Result
2007	Outstanding Reality-Competition Program	Top Chef	Nominated
2007	Outstanding Cinematography For Reality Programming	Craig Spirko, Gus Dominguez (for "Seven")	Nominated
2008	Outstanding Reality-Competition Program	Top Chef	Nominated
2008	Outstanding Cinematography For Reality Programming	Paul Starkman (for "Finale, Part 1")	Nominated
2008	Outstanding Picture Editing For Reality Programming	Kevin Leffler, Vikash Patel, Marc Clark, Annie Tighe, Steve Lichtenstein, Sue Hoover, Katherine Griffin (for "First Impressions")	Won
2009	Outstanding Reality-Competition Program	Top Chef	Nominated
2009	Outstanding Cinematography For Reality Programming	Tim Spellman (for "The Last Supper")	Nominated
2009	Outstanding Picture Editing For Reality Programming	Annie Tighe, Alan Hoang, Adrienne Salisbury, Kevin Leffler, Katherine Griffin, Sue Hoover, LaRonda Morris (for "The Last Supper")	Nominated
2009	Outstanding Directing For Nonfiction Programming	Steve Hrynewicz (for "The Last Supper")	Nominated
2009	Outstanding Host For A Reality Or Reality-Competition Program	Padma Lakshmi, Tom Colicchio	Nominated
2010	Outstanding Reality-Competition Program	Top Chef	Won
2010	Outstanding Cinematography For Reality Programming	Tim Spellman (for "Vivre Las Vegas")	Nominated
2010	Outstanding Picture Editing For Reality Programming	Adrienne Salisbury, Matt Reynolds, Jamie Pedroza, LaRonda Morris, Steve Lichtenstein, Kevin Kearney, Katherine Griffin (for "Vivre Las Vegas")	Nominated
2011	Outstanding Reality-Competition Program	Top Chef	Nominated
2011	Outstanding Cinematography For Reality Programming	Tim Spellman (for "Give Me Your Huddled Masses")	Nominated
2011	Outstanding Picture Editing For Reality Programming	Kevin Kearney, LaRonda Morris, Bri Dellinger, Michael Lynn Deis, Chris Colombel, Tom Danon, Jeff Nemetz (for "Give Me Your Huddled Masses")	Nominated
2011	Outstanding Directing For Nonfiction Programming	Paul Starkman (for "Give Me Your Huddled Masses")	Nominated
2012	Outstanding Reality-Competition Program	Top Chef	Nominated
2012	Outstanding Cinematography For Reality Programming	Ari Boles (for "Fit For An Evil Queen")	Nominated
2012	Outstanding Picture Editing For Reality Programming	Tony Rivard, Chris Colombel, Jeannie Gilgenberg, Hans van Riet, Tony Fisher, Kent Bassett, Matt Reynolds (for "Fit For An Evil Queen")	Nominated
2012	Outstanding Creative Achievement In Interactive Media - Enhancement To A Television Program Or Series	Top Chef: Last Chance Kitchen	Nominated
2012	Outstanding Special Class - Short-Format Nonfiction Programs	Top Chef: Last Chance Kitchen	Nominated
2013	Outstanding Reality-Competition Program	Top Chef	Nominated
2013	Outstanding Cinematography For Reality Programming	Ari Boles (for "Glacial Gourmand")	Nominated
2013	Outstanding Special Class - Short-Format Nonfiction Programs	Top Chef: Last Chance Kitchen	Nominated
2013	Outstanding Creative Achievement In Interactive Media - Multiplatform Storytelling	Top Chef: Last Chance Kitchen	Won
2014	Outstanding Reality-Competition Program	Top Chef	Nominated
2015	Outstanding Reality-Competition Program	Top Chef	Nominated
2016	Outstanding Reality-Competition Program	Top Chef	Nominated
2017	Outstanding Reality-Competition Program	Top Chef	Nominated
2018	Outstanding Reality-Competition Program	Top Chef	Nominated
2018	Outstanding Short Form Nonfiction Or Reality Series	Top Chef: Last Chance Kitchen	Nominated
2019	Outstanding Competition Program	Top Chef	Nominated
2020	Outstanding Competition Program	Top Chef	Nominated
2020	Outstanding Picture Editing For A Structured Reality Or Competition Program	Matt Reynolds, David Chalfin, Mike Abitz, Eric Lambert, Jose Rodriguez, Dan Williams (for "The Jonathan Gold Standard")	Nominated
2020	Outstanding Directing For A Reality Program	Ariel Boles (for "The Jonathan Gold Standard")	Nominated
2020	Outstanding Host For A Reality Or Competition Program	Padma Lakshmi, Tom Colicchio	Nominated
2021	Outstanding Competition Program	Top Chef	Nominated
2021	Outstanding Picture Editing For A Structured Reality Or Competition Program	Steve Lichtenstein, Mike Abitz, Ericka Concha, Tim Daniel, George Dybas, Eric Lambert, Matt Reynolds, Daniel Ruiz, Dan Williams (for "Restaurant Wars")	Nominated
2021	Outstanding Directing For A Reality Program	Ari Boles (for "Pan African Portland")	Nominated
2021	Outstanding Host For A Reality Or Competition Program	Padma Lakshmi, Tom Colicchio, Gail Simmons	Nominated
2021	Outstanding Casting For A Reality Program	Ron Mare	Nominated
2021	Outstanding Short Form Nonfiction Or Reality Series	Top Chef: Last Chance Kitchen	Nominated
2022	Outstanding Competition Program	Top Chef	Nominated
2022	Outstanding Picture Editing For A Structured Reality Or Competition Program	Steve Lichtenstein, Ericka Concha, Tim Daniel, George Dybas, Eric Lambert, Anthony Rivard, Jay Rogers, Sarah Goff, Matt Reynolds, Clark Vogeler (for "Restaurant Wars")	Nominated
2022	Outstanding Directing For A Reality Program	Ari Boles (for "Freedmen's Town")	Nominated
2022	Outstanding Host For A Reality Or Competition Program	Padma Lakshmi	Nominated
2022	Outstanding Casting For A Reality Program	Samantha Hanks, Ron Mare	Nominated
2022	Outstanding Short Form Nonfiction Or Reality Series	Top Chef: Last Chance Kitchen	Nominated
2023	Outstanding Reality Competition Program	Top Chef	Nominated
2023	Outstanding Picture Editing For A Structured Reality Or Competition Program	Steve Lichtenstein, Ericka Concha, Blanka Kovacs, Eric Lambert, Matt Reynolds, Jay M. Rogers, Brian Freundlich, Brian Giberson, Malia Jurick, Brian Kane, Daniel Ruiz, Anthony J. Rivard, Annie Tighe, Tony West (for Body of Work)	Nominated
2023	Outstanding Directing For A Reality Program	Ariel Boles (for "London Calling")	Nominated
2023	Outstanding Host For A Reality Or Competition Program	Padma Lakshmi	Nominated
2023	Outstanding Casting For A Reality Program	Ron Mare, Sena Rich, Erinlee Skilton	Nominated
2024	Outstanding Reality Competition Program	Top Chef	Nominated
2024	Outstanding Picture Editing For A Structured Reality Or Competition Program	Steve Lichtenstein, Ericka Concha, George Dybas, Malia Jurick, Brian Kane, Chris King, Eric Lambert, Joon Hee Lim, Matt Reynolds, Jay M. Rogers, Daniel Ruiz, Reggie Spangler, Annie Tighe (for Body of Work)	Nominated
2024	Outstanding Host For A Reality Or Reality Competition Program	Kristen Kish	Nominated
2025	Outstanding Reality Competition Program	Top Chef	Nominated
2025	Outstanding Directing For A Reality Program	Ariel Boles (for "Foraged in Fire")	Nominated
2025	Outstanding Host For A Reality Or Reality Competition Program	Kristen Kish	Nominated
2026	Outstanding Reality Competition Program	Top Chef	Nominated
2026	Outstanding Directing For A Reality Program	Anna Moulaison (for "Carolina Roots")	Nominated
2026	Outstanding Host For A Reality Or Reality Competition Program	Kristen Kish	Nominated
2026	Outstanding Casting For A Reality Program	Ron Mare, Heather Allyn, Joy Barrett, Anna Sturgeon, Sena Rich	Nominated

==== Other awards ====
Year	Association	Category	Nominee	Result	Ref.
2008	James Beard Foundation Media Awards	Best Television Food Special	"Top Chef Holiday Special"	Won	
2011	TCA Awards	Outstanding Achievement in Reality Programming	Top Chef: All-Stars	Nominated	
2011	Critics' Choice Television Awards	Best Reality Series - Competition	Top Chef	Nominated	
2014	Critics' Choice Television Awards	Best Reality Series - Competition	Top Chef	Nominated	
2020	TCA Awards	Outstanding Achievement in Reality Programming	Top Chef: All-Stars L.A.	Nominated	
2021	TCA Awards	Outstanding Achievement in Reality Programming	Top Chef: Portland	Nominated	
2021	Hollywood Critics Association TV Awards	Best Cable or Streaming Reality Series, Competition Series, or Game Show	Top Chef	Nominated	
2022	TCA Awards	Outstanding Achievement in Reality Programming	Top Chef: Houston	Nominated	
2022	Critics' Choice Real TV Awards	Best Competition Series	Top Chef	Won	
2022	Critics' Choice Real TV Awards	Best Culinary Show	Top Chef	Won	
2022	Critics' Choice Real TV Awards	Best Ensemble Cast in an Unscripted Series	Top Chef	Nominated	
2022	Critics' Choice Real TV Awards	Best Show Host	Padma Lakshmi	Won	
2022	Critics' Choice Real TV Awards	Female Star of the Year	Padma Lakshmi	Nominated	
2022	Hollywood Critics Association TV Awards	Best Cable Reality Show or Competition Series	Top Chef	Nominated	
2023	TCA Awards	Outstanding Achievement in Reality Programming	Top Chef	Nominated	
2023	Critics' Choice Real TV Awards	Best Culinary Show	Top Chef	Won	
2023	Critics' Choice Real TV Awards	Best Show Host	Padma Lakshmi	Won	
2023	Critics' Choice Real TV Awards	Star of the Year	Padma Lakshmi	Nominated	
2023	GLAAD Media Awards	Outstanding Reality Competition Program	Top Chef	Nominated	
2024	TCA Awards	Outstanding Achievement in Reality Programming	Top Chef	Nominated	
2024	Critics' Choice Real TV Awards	Best Competition Series	Top Chef	Nominated	
2024	Critics' Choice Real TV Awards	Best Culinary Show	Top Chef	Won	
2024	Critics' Choice Real TV Awards	Best Show Host	Kristen Kish	Nominated	
2024	People's Choice Awards	Host of the Year	Padma Lakshmi	Nominated	
2025	TCA Awards	Outstanding Achievement in Reality	Top Chef	Nominated	
2025	Critics' Choice Real TV Awards	Best Competition Series	Top Chef	Nominated	
2025	Critics' Choice Real TV Awards	Best Culinary Show	Top Chef	Nominated	
2025	Critics' Choice Real TV Awards	Best Ensemble Cast in an Unscripted Series	Top Chef	Nominated	
2025	Critics' Choice Real TV Awards	Best Show Host	Kristen Kish	Nominated	
2025	GLAAD Media Awards	Outstanding Reality Competition Program	Top Chef	Nominated	
2026	TCA Awards	Outstanding Achievement in Reality	Top Chef	Nominated	
2026	Critics' Choice Real TV Awards	Best Competition Series	Top Chef	Nominated	
2026	Critics' Choice Real TV Awards	Best Culinary Show	Top Chef	Won	
2026	Critics' Choice Real TV Awards	Best Show Host	Kristen Kish	Nominated	

=== U.S. television ratings ===
Season	Season premiere		Season finale	
Season	Date	US viewers (millions)	Date	US viewers (millions)
1	March 8, 2006	1.30	May 24, 2006	1.50
2	October 18, 2006	1.87	January 31, 2007	3.89
3	June 13, 2007	2.02	October 3, 2007	3.08
4	March 12, 2008	2.26	June 11, 2008	3.51
5	November 12, 2008	2.70	February 25, 2009	3.74
6	August 19, 2009	2.60	December 9, 2009	3.40
7	June 16, 2010	1.80	September 15, 2010	2.70
8	December 1, 2010	1.70	March 30, 2011	2.77
9	November 2, 2011	1.59	February 29, 2012	1.85
10	November 7, 2012	—N/a	February 27, 2013	1.85
11	October 2, 2013	—N/a	February 5, 2014	1.70
12	October 15, 2014	1.09	February 11, 2015	0.96
13	December 2, 2015	0.80	March 17, 2016	1.17
14	December 1, 2016	0.80	March 2, 2017	1.29
15	December 7, 2017	0.88	March 8, 2018	0.93
16	December 6, 2018	0.83	March 14, 2019	0.91
17	March 19, 2020	0.76	June 18, 2020	1.04
18	April 1, 2021	0.82	July 1, 2021	0.89
19	March 3, 2022	0.70	June 2, 2022	0.69
20	March 9, 2023	0.61	June 8, 2023	0.68
21	March 20, 2024	0.49	June 19, 2024	0.67
22	March 13, 2025	0.47	June 12, 2025	0.46
23	March 9, 2026	0.37	June 8, 2026	0.30

== See also ==
- List of Top Chef contestants
