= Erick Williams =

American chef (born 1974/75)

- Born: 1974 or 1975 (age 50–51)
- Culinary career
- Cooking style: Black Southern cuisine
- Current restaurants: Virtue Restaurant & Bar; Mustard Seed Kitchen; Daisy’s Po-Boy and Tavern; Top This Mac N' Cheese
- Previous restaurant: mk
- Award won: James Beard Award for Best Chef in the Great Lakes Region

Erick Williams is an American chef. In 2022, he was named Best Chef in the Great Lakes Region by the James Beard Foundation.

== Early life and education ==
Williams was born in Chicago and raised in Chicago's Lawndale and Austin neighborhoods. He first started cooking by helping his grandmother prepare dinner.

== Career ==
Williams worked for nearly 20 years at mk in Chicago's River North neighborhood, where he started as a salad chef and in 2008 became executive chef and eventually part owner.

In 2018, Williams opened Virtue in Chicago's Hyde Park neighborhood, hiring Damarr Brown, who had been his sous chef at mk, as chef de cuisine. The restaurant serves Black southern cuisine. Esquire and Eater named it to their lists of the best new restaurants in the country in 2019. In 2022, Garden & Gun asked rhetorically, "Is it possible the best restaurant now interpreting the food of Black Southerners does business outside the South?" In 2021, he opened Mustard Seed Kitchen in the South Loop and in 2022 Daisy’s Po-Boy and Tavern in Hyde Park. He also owns a fast-casual restaurant, Top This Mac N' Cheese.

In 2019, The New York Times named Williams one of sixteen Black chefs "changing food in America". According to Crain's Chicago Business, Bloomberg News and Ebony, he "paved the way" and "fueled" the development of fine-dining Southern cuisine in Chicago.

== Awards ==
In 2019, Williams received Food & Dining's Gamechanger Award. In 2020 the Chicago Tribune named Williams Chef of the Year. In 2022 Williams was named Best Chef in the Great Lakes Region by the James Beard Foundation. In 2023 Nation's Restaurant News named him Innovator of the Year.

== Personal life ==
Williams is married. His wife's name is Tiffany.
