= Le Cordon Bleu College of Culinary Arts in Chicago =

Former college in Chicago

- Type: For-profit
- Active: 1983–2017
- Affiliations: American Association of Collegiate Registrars and Admissions, American Culinary Federation. , American Institute of Wine and Food, Career College Association, Chicago Chamber of Commerce, Food Educator Network International, Illinois Restaurant Association, International Association of Culinary Professionals, National Association of Student Financial Aid Administrators, National Restaurant Association, Retail Bakers' Association, River North Association, World Association of Chefs Societies.
- Location: 361 West Chestnut; Chicago, IL 60610, Chicago, Illinois, United States; 41°53′52.7″N 87°38′18.1″W
- Website: Le Cordon Bleu College of Culinary Arts in Chicago

Le Cordon Bleu College of Culinary Arts in Chicago (formerly known as The Cooking and Hospitality Institute of Chicago) was an American culinary school founded in 1983, and closed in September 2017. The school was accredited by the Higher Learning Commission and was located in Chicago, Illinois. The school offered an Associate of Occupational Studies degree, a Certificate Program in Le Cordon Bleu Culinary Arts, and an Associate of Occupational Studies degree in Le Cordon Bleu Pâtisserie and Baking.

== History ==
Le Cordon Bleu College of Culinary Arts in Chicago (formerly known as The Cooking and Hospitality Institute of Chicago) was founded in May 1983. The school was designed to prepare students for careers in the culinary arts. Linda Calafiore, a successful cook, established the school using traditional European teaching methods. Since its opening, the school has had thousands of graduates, many of whom went on to work in restaurants around the nation.

The school expanded in 1989 and received degree-granting authorization in 1991. Le Cordon Bleu College of Culinary Arts in Chicago was acquired on February 1, 2000, by the Career Education Corporation. In June 2000, the school became affiliated with Le Cordon Bleu. The Higher Learning Commission accredited the school in 2003.

The campus was again expanded in 2004. Due to demand for the Le Cordon Bleu Program, additional kitchen space was required. Five new industry-current kitchens were built, along with two classrooms and a modern computer lounge.

In 2013 it paid $40 million to settle a class-action lawsuit brought by former students who alleged Career Education oversold the benefits of a Cordon Bleu diploma, leaving them with large student loans and only poor-paying restaurant industry jobs.

In December 2016, Career Education Corporation announced that it would no longer be enrolling students for its Le Cordon Bleu program on campuses across the United States. They closed the program entirely by September 2017.

== Notable alumni ==
- Damarr Brown (2011)
- Kristen Kish
