= Damarr Brown =

American chef

- Born: 1990 or 1991 (age 34–35); Germany
- Education: Le Cordon Bleu College of Culinary Arts in Chicago
- Culinary career
- Cooking style: Black Southern cuisine
- Television show: Top Chef Houston
- Award won: James Beard Foundation Emerging Chef 2023

Damarr Brown is an American chef. In 2022 he was named one of the country's best new chefs by Food & Wine and in 2023 he was named the James Beard Foundation's Emerging Chef.

== Early life and education ==
Brown was born in Germany and grew up in Harvey, Illinois. He is an only child and was raised by his mother, grandmother, and aunt, all of whom encouraged his interest in cooking. His mother set Chopped-style challenges for him, purchasing a variety of ingredients and telling him to produce a dish with them. His grandmother was born in Mississippi, and he learned to cook Black southern cuisine from her.

Brown graduated from Chicago's Le Cordon Bleu College of Culinary Arts in 2011.

== Career ==
Brown worked at mk in Chicago for seven years under Erick Williams, starting as an unpaid prep cook and eventually as garde manger and sous chef. With Williams' encouragement he moved to Roister for a year, and when Williams opened Virtue in Chicago's Hyde Park neighborhood in 2018, he hired Brown as chef de cuisine. Virtue serves Black southern cuisine. Esquire named it to their list of the best new restaurants in the country in 2019.

In 2022 Brown competed on Top Chef, coming in fourth behind Buddha Lo, Evelyn Garcia, and Sarah Welch; Brown was voted fan favorite. That same year, Food & Wine named him one of the country's best new chefs in 2022.

Brown and three other Black James Beard Award winners, including Williams, Gregory Gourdet, and Kwame Onwuachi created a popup restaurant showcasing cuisines of the African diaspora at the 2023 Aspen Food & Wine Classic.

== Awards ==
In 2023 Brown was named Best Emerging Chef by the James Beard Foundation.
