= Top Chef: Houston =

Season 19 of American television series

- Season 19
- Hosted by: Padma Lakshmi
- Judges: Tom Colicchio; Gail Simmons
- No. of contestants: 15
- Winner: Buddha Lo
- Runners-up: Evelyn Garcia; Sarah Welch
- Location: Houston, Texas, and Galveston Island
- Finals venue: Tucson, Arizona
- Fan Favorite: Damarr Brown
- No. of episodes: 14

Release
- Original network: Bravo
- Original release: March 3 – June 2, 2022

Season chronology
- ← Previous; Portland Next → World All-Stars

Top Chef: Houston is the nineteenth season of the American reality television series Top Chef. It was first announced by Bravo and NBCUniversal on September 21, 2021. The competition was filmed in Houston, Texas, which was not featured during the series' previous Texas-themed season, and Galveston Island. The season finale took place in Tucson, Arizona. The winner received US$250,000.

A variation of Top Chef: Portland's alumni judging panel was implemented. In each episode, the trio of Padma Lakshmi, Tom Colicchio, and Gail Simmons were joined by a former Top Chef competitor, along with a local or nationally acclaimed chef as a guest judge. In addition to the returning Last Chance Kitchen, a new web series titled Top Recipe was released each week, which featured Top Chef alum Dale Talde demonstrating how to cook winning Quickfire and Elimination Challenge dishes from the season.

Top Chef: Houston premiered on March 3, 2022, and concluded on June 2, 2022. In the season finale, Buddha Lo was declared the winner over runners-up Evelyn Garcia and Sarah Welch. Damarr Brown was voted Fan Favorite.

== Production ==
Filming in Houston covered roughly five weeks, beginning in late September 2021 and completing at the end of October. The same COVID-19 protocols used for Top Chef: Portland remained in effect, requiring frequent tests for the coronavirus and masks to be worn by production staff. The campaign to promote Houston as the next location for Top Chef was led by Houston First, who showed off the city to Magical Elves Productions and helped scout for potential sites to highlight during the season. The set for the show was constructed at the NRG Arena. Filming for the final two episodes in Tucson was completed in November 2021, with Visit Tucson offering US$750,000 to cover production and relocation costs.

== Contestants ==
Fifteen chefs competed in Top Chef: Houston. Jackson Kalb was notable for contracting COVID-19 a few weeks before the show began filming. While Kalb did not lose his spot among the cast, he ended up having to compete without his sense of taste or smell.

Name	Hometown	Current Residence (Note: The contestants' city and state of residence during time of filming.)
Damarr Brown	Chicago, Illinois	
Jo Chan	Palmdale, California	Austin, Texas
Monique Feybesse	San Francisco, California	Vallejo, California
Leia Gaccione	Passaic, New Jersey	Morristown, New Jersey
Evelyn Garcia	Houston, Texas	
Robert Hernandez	Downey, California	San Francisco, California
Jae Jung	Seoul, South Korea	New York City, New York
Jackson Kalb	Los Angeles, California	
Sam Kang	Gardena, California	Brooklyn, New York
Luke Kolpin	Seattle, Washington	
Buddha Lo	Port Douglas, Australia	Brooklyn, New York
Stephanie Miller	Bismarck, North Dakota	
Ashleigh Shanti	Virginia Beach, Virginia	Asheville, North Carolina
Nick Wallace	Edwards, Mississippi	Jackson, Mississippi
Sarah Welch	Ann Arbor, Michigan	Detroit, Michigan

Buddha Lo returned to compete in Top Chef: World All-Stars.

== Contestant progress ==
Episode #		1	2	3	4	5	6	7	8	9	10	11	12	13	14
Quickfire Challenge Winner(s)		Buddha; Jo; Monique	Damarr	N/A	Jackson^{1}	Nick	Ashleigh; Nick	Buddha	N/A	Damarr	Nick^{1}	Evelyn^{1}	N/A	Sarah^{1}	N/A
Contestant		Elimination Challenge Results													
1	Buddha	IN	IN	LOW	WIN	HIGH	HIGH	IN	HIGH	LOW	WIN	WIN	HIGH	IN	WINNER
2	Evelyn	IN	IN	HIGH	LOW	WIN	WIN	WIN	LOW	IN	HIGH	HIGH	IN	WIN	RUNNER-UP
2	Sarah	HIGH	LOW	IN	OUT							LOW^{3}	WIN	IN	RUNNER-UP
4	Damarr	IN	WIN	IN	IN	IN	IN	IN	HIGH	HIGH	LOW	HIGH	LOW	OUT	
5	Nick	IN	IN	IN	IN	IN	IN	WIN	HIGH	IN	HIGH	LOW	OUT		
6	Ashleigh	IN	IN	LOW	HIGH	OUT	LOW^{2}	IN	WIN	LOW	LOW	OUT			
7	Jae	LOW	IN	WIN	IN	IN	IN	LOW	IN	WIN	OUT				
8	Luke	IN	LOW	IN	HIGH	IN	LOW	IN	LOW	OUT					
9	Jackson	HIGH	IN	HIGH	WIN	HIGH	HIGH	WIN	OUT						
10	Jo	IN	IN	IN	LOW	LOW	IN	OUT							
11	Monique	IN	IN	IN	IN	LOW	OUT								
12	Robert	WIN	IN	IN	OUT										
13	Sam	IN	IN	OUT											
14	Stephanie	LOW	OUT												
15	Leia	OUT													

^Note 1: The chef(s) did not receive immunity for winning the Quickfire Challenge.
^Note 2: Ashleigh won the first Last Chance Kitchen re-entry challenge and returned to the competition.
^Note 3: Sarah won the second Last Chance Kitchen re-entry challenge and returned to the competition.

(WINNER) The chef won the season and was crowned "Top Chef".
(RUNNER-UP) The chef was a runner-up for the season.
(WIN) The chef won the Elimination Challenge.
(HIGH) The chef was selected as one of the top entries in the Elimination Challenge, but did not win.
(IN) The chef was not selected as one of the top or bottom entries in the Elimination Challenge and was safe.
(LOW) The chef was selected as one of the bottom entries in the Elimination Challenge, but was not eliminated.
(OUT) The chef lost the Elimination Challenge.

== Episodes ==
No. overall	No. in season	Title	Original release date	US viewers (millions)
275	1	"Primal Instincts"	March 3, 2022	0.70
Quickfire Challenge: In teams of three, the chefs were asked to create cohesive dishes while cooking relay-style. The chefs took turns cooking their team's dish, but were only allowed ten minutes each. In addition, teammates were not allowed to communicate with each other about the direction of their dishes. The members of the winning team received immunity from elimination. The guest judge was Top Chef: Portland runner-up Dawn Burrell.: Red Team: Jae, Leia, Stephanie; Blue Team: Ashleigh, Luke, Sam; Green Team: Damarr, Evelyn, Nick; Yellow Team: Buddha, Jo, Monique; Brown Team: Jackson, Robert, Sarah; Winners: Buddha, Jo, Monique (Thai Barbecued Beef with Salsa Verde Salad, Charred Scallions & Fish Sauce Butter); Elimination Challenge: Working in the same teams as the Quickfire Challenge, the chefs were tasked with creating three-course menus featuring primal cuts of beef to be served at The Annie Café & Bar. The five options included chuck, rib, short loin, sirloin, and round. Each team was only allowed to use one of the five primal cuts, which were available first-come, first-served. They were also responsible for butchering the meat themselves. The guest judges were Top Chef: Seattle winner Kristen Kish and chef Robert Del Grande.: Winner: Robert (Braised Pot Roast with Potato Gnocchi, Olive Tapenade & Parmesan Cream); Eliminated: Leia (Top Round Steak Summer Rolls with Peaches & Tahini Lime Sauce)
276	2	"Friday Night Bites"	March 10, 2022	0.79
Quickfire Challenge: The chefs put their own spin on queso. They had to include an accompanying item to dip into their queso, but were not allowed to make tortilla chips. The winner received immunity from elimination. The guest judge was chef Irma Galvan.: Winner: Damarr (Mild Cheddar Queso, Pickled Serrano Chiles & Toasted Bread Crumbs with Smoked Paprika); Elimination Challenge: The chefs were divided into two teams: the blue "Wildcats" and the red "Cougars". Each team was coached by a Top Chef alumni, with Dawn Burrell leading the Wildcats and Top Chef: Los Angeles finalist/Top Chef: Charleston contestant Sam Talbot leading the Cougars. The teams competed in seven head-to-head battles for a Friday Night Lights football-themed challenge at the Tomball ISD Stadium. The dishes, which were required to be heavy in carbohydrates, were presented to the judging panel, consisting of Padma Lakshmi, Tom Colicchio, Gail Simmons, Top Chef: Seattle runner-up/Top Chef: Charleston winner Brooke Williamson, and chef Chris Shepherd. Each judge voted for their favorite dish in each head-to-head battle. One vote netted the team five yards, with a maximum of 25 yards available per round. The objective of the game was to score 100 yards to cross the football field from one end zone to the other, thus scoring a touchdown and securing victory. If a team was unable to score a touchdown by the end of seven rounds, then chefs from either team were eligible to win or be eliminated.: Wildcats (Blue Team): Damarr, Jo, Luke, Monique, Robert, Sam, Sarah; Cougars (Red Team): Ashleigh, Buddha, Evelyn, Jackson, Jae, Nick, Stephanie; Winner: Damarr (Dirty Farro with 'Nduja, Chicken Thighs & Chicken Liver); Eliminated: Stephanie (Feijoada with Rice, Cilantro Salad, Toasted Cassava & Orange)
277	3	"Noodles and Rice and Everything Nice"	March 17, 2022	0.75
Elimination Challenge: The chefs were challenged to create street food dishes inspired by Asian flavors. The dishes were served to 100 guests at an Asian night market held at the POST Houston cultural center. The contestants were randomly assigned cuisines for inspiration, which included Vietnamese, Indian, Chinese, Filipino, and Japanese. Despite sharing cuisines, the chefs competed individually. The winner received US$10,000. The guest judges were Top Chef: Miami winner Hung Huynh and chef Kiran Verma.: Chinese: Ashleigh, Jae, Monique; Filipino: Jo, Robert; Indian: Buddha, Luke, Sam; Japanese: Damarr, Nick; Vietnamese: Evelyn, Jackson, Sarah; Winner: Jae (Stir Fried Udon with Chinese Sausage, Korean Melon & Ramen Topping); Eliminated: Sam ("Samaloo" - Potato Curry with Pomegranate Chutney)
278	4	"Doppelgängers"	March 24, 2022	0.76
Quickfire Challenge: The chefs created biscuit dishes from scratch. Instead of immunity, the winner received an advantage in the Elimination Challenge. The guest judge was chef Chris Williams, great grandson of Texasa African American culinary and business pioneer Lucille Elizabeth Bishop Smith, inventor of the first hot biscuit mix.: Winner: Jackson (Scallion Biscuit Glazed in Hot Maple with Ostrich Sausage, Crispy Cheddar & Fried Egg); Elimination Challenge: The chefs, working in pairs, had to make two dishes that looked exactly the same, but tasted completely different. As the winner of the Quickfire Challenge, Jackson was able to choose his partner first. His team also earned 30 extra minutes of cooking time. Both members of the losing team were eliminated. The guest judges were Top Chef: Boston finalist/Top Chef: All-Stars L.A. winner Melissa King and Top Chef Masters alum Wylie Dufresne.: Red Team: Damarr, Monique; Orange Team: Jae, Nick; Yellow Team: Robert, Sarah; Green Team: Evelyn, Jo; Blue Team: Buddha, Jackson; Brown Team: Ashleigh, Luke; Winners: Buddha ("Strawberries & Cream" - White Chocolate Panna Cotta, Strawberry Jelly, Strawberry Bon Bons with Cream & Basil Dressing); Jackson ("Everything But The Bagel" - Salmon Tartare, Capers, Shallots, Cream Cheese Bavarois, Marinated Tomato & Buttermilk Scallion Dressing); Eliminated: Robert (Strawberry Panna Cotta with Crème Fraîche, Japanese Brown Sugar Crumble, Kiwi & Basil); Sarah (Shrimp Sausage, Brown Butter Brioche Crumb with Compressed Cucumber Pickles & Pepper Sauce)
279	5	"Don't Mess with BBQ"	March 31, 2022	0.83
Quickfire Challenge: The chefs made dishes using Texas toast for Tom Colicchio and guest judge Brooke Williamson. The winner received immunity from elimination and US$10,000.: Winner: Nick (Texas Toast BLT with Pancetta & Cheese); Elimination Challenge: The chefs were asked to create innovative dishes highlighting smoked brisket. Upon meeting at J-Bar-M Barbecue, the contestants trimmed and seasoned their brisket before placing it in the restaurant's smoker for 12 hours. The guest judges were Brooke Williamson and pitmaster Greg Gatlin.: Winner: Evelyn (Brisket Curry with Aromatic Rice, Pickled Vegetables & Burnt Ends Crumble); Eliminated: Ashleigh (Kitchen Pepper Rubbed Brisket, Sweet Potato Slicks & Cream of Collard Soup)
280	6	"Texas Trailblaze-hers"	April 7, 2022	0.77
Quickfire Challenge: To start, half of the chefs were instructed to grab a salty ingredient, while the other half grabbed a sweet ingredient. The full nature of the challenge was then revealed, which required the chefs to pair up to make sweet and salty desserts for a Talenti gelato-sponsored challenge. The winning team received immunity from elimination and US$10,000 to split between them. Following Episode 5 of Last Chance Kitchen, Ashleigh rejoined the competition. The guest judges were Top Chef: Kentucky winner Kelsey Barnard Clark and Top Chef: Kentucky/Top Chef: All-Stars L.A. contestant Nini Nguyen.: Red Team: Ashleigh, Nick (Ginger Snaps & Pork Rinds); Yellow Team: Damarr, Monique (Sweet Corn & Pepitas); Green Team: Evelyn, Jo (Marcona Almonds & Peaches); Blue Team: Jackson, Jae (Pistachios & Asian Pears); Brown Team: Buddha, Luke (Honeycomb & Miso); Winners: Ashleigh, Nick (Ginger Snap Bundt Cake with Lemon Ice, Salted Molasses Buttermilk & Brown Butter Pork Rind Mulberry Crumble); Elimination Challenge: The chefs were tasked with creating dishes that honored the lives of five trailblazing Texas women: Ann Richards, Babe Didrikson Zaharias, Barbara Jordan, Bessie Coleman, and Selena. Despite sharing the same pioneers for inspiration, the chefs competed individually. The dishes were served to a table of prominent guest diners, including Suzette Quintanilla, Sheryl Swoopes, Lori Choi, Lauren Anderson, and Cecile Richards. The guest judges were Top Chef: D.C. contestant/Top Chef: All-Stars finalist Tiffany Derry and MasterChef Season 3 winner Christine Hà.: Ann Richards: Jo, Nick; Babe Didrikson Zaharias: Ashleigh, Jae; Barbara Jordan: Jackson, Monique; Bessie Coleman: Buddha, Luke; Selena: Damarr, Evelyn; Winner: Evelyn ("Como La Flor" - Snapper with Asian Pears, Chives, Avocado, Orange Zest & Aguachile with Chipotle Olive Oil); Eliminated: Monique (Fried Oysters with Assorted Beans, Pickled Okra & Pancetta Bean Broth)
281	7	"Swallow the Competition"	April 14, 2022	0.66
Quickfire Challenge: The chefs were randomly assigned one of three swallows, a starchy and dough-like Nigerian staple food: amala (green plantains), eba (cassava), and iyan (pounded yams). After sampling the swallows with some accompanying Nigerian soups and stews, such as egusi soup, efo riro, and seafood okra soup, the chefs were asked to cook their own dish to complement their swallow. The winner received immunity from elimination. The guest judges were Top Chef: California contestant Kwame Onwuachi and chef Ope Amosu.: Winner: Buddha (Iyan - Shrimp & Guineafowl with Peanuts & Fried Plantains); Elimination Challenge: The chefs, split into three teams, created dinosaur-themed progressive menus for a Jurassic World Dominion-sponsored challenge. Each team received dossiers on the Mosasaurus, Quetzalcoatlus, and Velociraptor, which served as inspiration for their courses. The dinner was held at the Houston Museum of Natural Science. The winning team received a VIP trip to the world premiere of Jurassic World Dominion. The guest judges for the challenge were Kwame Onwuachi and Top Chef: Colorado winner Joe Flamm. Actress DeWanda Wise appeared as a guest diner.: Red Team: Buddha, Jae, Jo; Green Team: Ashleigh, Damarr, Luke; Brown Team: Evelyn, Jackson, Nick; Winners: Evelyn (Quetzalcoatlus - Pork Tenderloin with Black Garlic Sauce, Pecan Crumb & Sweet Potato Purée); Jackson (Velociraptor - Fudgy Cacao Cake with Sweet Potato, Pecan & Raspberry Blood); Nick (Mosasaurus - Crab Croquette with Pepper Purée & Pecans); Eliminated: Jo (Quetzalcoatlus - Barbecue Stuffed Quail with Romesco & Roasted Carrots)
282	8	"Restaurant Wars"	April 21, 2022	0.74
Elimination Challenge: The chefs, separated into two teams, competed in Restaurant Wars. In addition to the returning VIP chef's table concept from the previous season, the teams went back to serving dining rooms full of guests. The restaurants were set up inside the POST Houston cultural center and featured open kitchens, allowing the judges and diners to watch the contestants cook during service. The teams had no restrictions on the number of dishes and courses needed to be served. While the judges declared an individual winner, each member of the winning team received US$10,000. The guest judges were Tiffany Derry and Food & Wine editor-in-chief Hunter Lewis.: Matriarc: Ashleigh (EC), Buddha (FOH), Damarr, Nick; First Course: Parker House Rolls with Ham Butter, Smoked Fish & Crab Tarts, Fried Oysters with Comeback Sauce (Buddha); Second Course: Salmon Tartare with Buttermilk Pearls & Peaches (Ashleigh); Third Course: Gumbo Z'herbes with Red Rice & Seasoning Meat (Ashleigh); Fourth Course: BBQ Strip Loin with Potatoes & Oxtail Marmalade (Nick); Fifth Course: Carrot Cake with Carrot Caramel, Coconut & Candied Ginger (Damarr); No Nem: Evelyn (EC), Jackson (FOH), Jae, Luke; First Course: Pani Puri with Shrimp, Passion Fruit & Thai Basil (Evelyn); Snapper "Summer Rolls" with Papaya, Citrus & Avocado (Jae); Second Course: Choo Chee Curry with Black Cod & Coconut Rice (Luke); BBQ Nem Sausage Wrap with Brussels Sprouts, Lettuce & Spicy Bean Sauce (Team Dish); Third Course: Shortbread with Mandarin Orange Citrus Curd & Whipped Coconut (Jackson); Winning Team: Matriarc; Winner: Ashleigh; Eliminated: Jackson
283	9	"Freedmen's Town"	April 28, 2022	0.73
Quickfire Challenge: The chefs were randomly assigned a box containing produce of the same color. The available colors were red, orange, yellow, green, purple, black, and white. They then had to use their ingredients to create a monochromatic vegetarian dish. The winner received immunity from elimination. The guest judge was Top Chef: Texas contestant Nyesha Arrington.: Winner: Damarr (Green - Harissa Glazed Broccoli with Chermoula & Avocado Purée); Elimination Challenge: The chefs catered a block party fundraiser held at the Bethel Baptist Church in honor of Juneteenth's Texas roots and the establishment of the freedmen's town located in Houston's Fourth Ward. The contestants had to contribute dishes that spoke from their hearts and souls, in reference to soul food. All proceeds from the fundraiser went towards the Houston Freedmen's Town Conservancy. The guest judges were Dawn Burrell and Kwame Onwuachi.: Winner: Jae (Mama Kim's Flaked Cod with Korean Sweet Potatoes, Kimchi & Shrimp Bisque); Eliminated: Luke (Mom's Meatloaf "Frikadeller Style" with White Cheddar Mash & Gravy Glaze)
284	10	"Dinner in Zero Gravity"	May 5, 2022	0.71
Quickfire Challenge: The chefs visited the Houston Farmer's Market, where they were tasked with putting their own spin on fajitas for a Chipotle Mexican Grill-sponsored challenge. The winner received US$10,000. Beginning with this Quickfire Challenge, immunity from elimination was no longer available as a reward. The guest judge was Top Chef: Colorado contestant Claudette Zepeda.: Winner: Nick (Tri-Tip, Cabbage & Black Bean Braise, Jicama Slaw & Lime Cilantro Cream with Corn Tortillas); Elimination Challenge: After touring the Space Center Houston, the chefs prepared dishes that could feed astronauts in space. The dishes were required to follow NASA guidelines on food consumption in a micro-g environment, such as limiting ingredients that could potentially create crumbs or free-floating liquids. The guest judges were Melissa King and Top Chef Masters Season 2 winner Marcus Samuelsson. Retired astronauts Cady Coleman, Tony Antonelli, and Susan Kilrain appeared as guest diners.: Winner: Buddha ("Apavlova 14" - Coconut Mousse with Berry Compote & Tropical Salsa); Eliminated: Jae (Bulgogi with Gochujang Barley, Sesame Mushrooms & Carrots)
285	11	"Family Vacation"	May 12, 2022	0.69
Quickfire Challenge: The chefs traveled to Galveston Island and created two-tier seafood towers at the beach. Each tower needed to include a hot dish and a cold dish. The winner received an advantage in the Elimination Challenge. Following the final episode of Last Chance Kitchen, Sarah rejoined the competition. The guest judge was Top Chef: Portland runner-up Shota Nakajima.: Winner: Evelyn (Cold - Oysters with Fish Sauce Vinaigrette, Chili Oil & Crispy Shallots; Hot - Thai Cajun Boil with Thai Chili Butter & Lime); Elimination Challenge: The chefs served family-style dishes catering to their own family members' tastes at a beachside vacation home for a Vrbo-sponsored challenge. As the winner of the Quickfire Challenge, Evelyn received an extra 30 minutes of cooking time. The winner received a complimentary stay, worth US$10,000, at any Vrbo vacation home around the world. The guest judges were Top Chef: Colorado runner-up Adrienne Cheatham and Top Chef: Seattle/Top Chef: Charleston finalist Sheldon Simeon.: Winner: Buddha ("Marry Me Pasta" - Pasta Amatriciana); Eliminated: Ashleigh (Paella Inspired Heirloom Rice with Red Shrimp & Calamari)
286	12	"We're on a Boat"	May 19, 2022	0.72
Elimination Challenge: The chefs went fishing off the Gulf of Mexico with Tom Colicchio and Dawn Burrell. They then had to make two different preparations using the fish they caught, to be served at the Bludorn Restaurant. The contestants were provided US$200 each to buy additional ingredients for their dishes. However, if they failed to catch anything, they would have to use their remaining budget to purchase fish from the market. The guest judges were Top Chef: Chicago winner Stephanie Izard and chef Daniel Boulud.: Winner: Sarah (Pickled Gulf Snapper with Silken Tofu, Fermented Greens & Kraut Broth; "Pastrami Sandwich" - Smoked Red Drum with Pastrami Spice, Carrot Butter & Parisian Gnocchi); Eliminated: Nick (Fried Redfish Taco with Pickled Peppers & Smoked Tomato Crema; Seared Bull Redfish Cake with Lemon Beurre Blanc & Mushroom Ragout)
287	13	"Cactus Makes Perfect"	May 26, 2022	0.63
Quickfire Challenge: The chefs were moved to Tucson, Arizona, for the final rounds of the competition. After meeting at El Charro Café, the oldest family-run Mexican restaurant in the United States, the contestants were asked to create a dish featuring carne seca. The winner received an advantage in the Elimination Challenge. The guest judge was chef Carlotta Flores.: Winner: Sarah (Carne Seca Gravy Over Polenta with Soft Egg, Morels & Blackberry Salsa); Elimination Challenge: The chefs had to make one savory dish and one sweet dish highlighting cactus and chiltepin. Prior to cooking, the chefs met with Top Chef: Portland contestant Maria Mazon at the Mission Garden to gather ingredients and learn about the Tucson food scene. As the winner of the Quickfire Challenge, Sarah received an extra 30 minutes of cooking time. The guest judges were Kristin Kish and Carlotta Flores.: Winner: Evelyn (Savory - Nopal Relleno with Shrimp Purée, Raw Nopal & Marigold; Sweet - Sour Orange & Sweet Lime Curd with Saguaro Pod Meringue, Prickly Pear Granita, Basil Flowers & Quince); Eliminated: Damarr (Savory - Pork Shoulder Glazed in Chiltepin Barbecue Sauce, Pikliz with Chiltepin, Grilled Nopales & Red Bean Purée; Sweet - Prickly Pear Cake Glazed with Prickly Pear Topped with Buttermilk Cheese, Saguaro & Frozen Mango)
288	14	"The Final Plate"	June 2, 2022	0.69
Elimination Challenge: The chefs were responsible for cooking the best four-course progressive meals of their lives. Each finalist was able to select a previously eliminated competitor to act as their sous chef; Buddha chose Jackson, Evelyn chose Jo, and Sarah chose Robert. The meals were served at the Tanque Verde Ranch to the regular judging panel, guest judges Stephanie Izard and Éric Ripert, as well as several guest diners, including Kristen Kish, Hunter Lewis, Top Chef: Boston runner-up/Top Chef: All-Stars L.A. finalist Gregory Gourdet, Top Chef: Texas contestant Edward Lee, chefs Janos Wilder and Alexander Smalls, and restaurateur Bricia Lopez.: Buddha: First Course: Hamachi with Sauce Vin Jaune, Caviar, Apple & Sweet Potato Bees; Second Course: Penang Laksa with Cannelloni, Lobster, King Crab & Carrot Butterfly Tuile; Third Course: Mongolian Lamb with Eggplant Purée, Asparagus, Miso Roasted Eggplant, Squash Blossom & Eggplant Tuile Leaves; Fourth Course: Pumpkin Pie Mille-Feuille with Pumpkin Custard, Crème Chantilly, Maple Caramel, Pumpkin Spice Cake & Pumpkin Leaves; Evelyn: First Course: Scallop Crudo with Prickly Pear & Citrus Broth, Sweet Potato & Crispy Quinoa; Second Course: Crystal Dumplings with Shrimp & Corn, Corn Broth, Hoja Santa Oil & Crispy Ginger; Third Course: Braised Goat with Curry Mole, Nopales & Spiced Squash Seeds; Fourth Course: Buñuelo with Cajeta Panna Cota, Cardamom Cream, Pitaya & Persimmon; Sarah: First Course: Venison & Beef Heart Tartare with Sourdough Miso & Smoked Butter; Second Course: Squash Dumpling with Corn Husk Broth, Miso, Huitlacoche Purée & Three Sisters Salad; Third Course: Rabbit Ballotine with Apricot, Chestnut & Herb Salad; Fourth Course: Acorn Cake with Buttermilk Ice Cream & Calypso Bean Miso Caramel; Winner: Buddha; Runners-up: Evelyn, Sarah

== Last Chance Kitchen ==
No.	Title	Original air date
1	"Two Cloche for Comfort"	March 10, 2022
Challenge: The chefs were given 30 minutes to create dishes highlighting local Houston ingredients. In addition, each chef was assigned an exotic protein to incorporate into their dish. Leia was given rattlesnake meat, while Stephanie was given alligator meat.: Leia: Cornmeal Fried Rattlesnake with Grapefruit Jicama Salad & Yogurt Grapefruit Shmear; Stephanie: Pepper Soda Marinated Fried Alligator, Lemon & Chermoula Sauce with Sliced Grapefruit & Scallions; Winner: Leia; Eliminated: Stephanie
2	"PotatOH No You Don't!"	March 17, 2022
Challenge: The chefs were given 30 minutes to make potato dishes. Prior to cooking, the chefs were presented with various ingredients and kitchen equipment, which they took turns selecting. Once chosen, these items became unavailable to their competitor. Leia chose the mandoline, peeler, bacon, onions, and cream, while Sam chose the fryer, grill, butter, garlic, and cheese.: Leia: Sweet Potato Hash with Bacon, Kale & Poached Egg; Sam: Potatoes in Garlic Butter Potato Sauce; Winner: Leia; Eliminated: Sam
3	"Double Jeopardy"	March 24, 2022
Challenge: The chefs were given 30 minutes to create both a savory dish and a sweet dish. Tom Colicchio selected his favorite savory dish first, granting the winner immunity. Brooke Williamson then judged the two remaining chefs' sweet dishes, resulting in one elimination.: Round 1 (Savory): Leia: Pan Roasted Pork Chop with Pan Roasted Apple Sauce; Robert: Shrimp Ceviche with Chili Paste, Fried Prawn Cracker, Cilantro & Red Onion; Sarah: Jerk Chilean Sea Bass in Coconut Broth with Fennel, Pomegranate & Cilantro Relish; Winner: Sarah; Round 2 (Sweet): Leia: Apple Caramel Ricotta Donuts; Robert: Buttermilk Pancake with Blueberry Sauce & Maple Seasoned Whipped Cream; ~~Sarah: Coconut Cream Pudding Topped with Pomegranate, Star Fruit & Lime Zest~~; Winner: Leia; Eliminated: Robert
4	"Panic in the Pantry"	March 31, 2022
Challenge: The chefs were given 30 minutes to cook any dish. However, they only had three minutes to shop in the Top Chef pantry. Once their shopping time expired, they were not allowed to go back into the pantry to grab extra ingredients. Two chefs advanced to the next round.: Leia: Woodfire Roasted Chicken Thigh, Butternut Squash & Fennel Purée with Roasted Cauliflower Hazelnut Relish; Sarah: Seared Salmon in Sesame Oil with Preserved Lemon Yogurt & Apple Fennel Slaw; Ashleigh: Grits with Okra Gravy, Okra Seed & Chili Relish; Winners: Sarah; Eliminated: Leia
5	"Station Swap"	March 31, 2022
Challenge: The chefs were given 30 minutes to create any dish using their competitor's ingredients from the previous challenge. The winner returned to the main competition, while the loser remained in Last Chance Kitchen.: Sarah: Okra Misti with Polenta & Fried Onion; Ashleigh: Salmon Tartare with Spiced Yogurt, Crispy Skin, Fennel Stock, Grated Apple & Walnut; Winner: Ashleigh
6	"Oh Broth-er!"	April 7, 2022
Challenge: The chefs were given 30 minutes to create a composed dish which included a flavorful broth.: Sarah: "Breakfast" Bacon Broth with Poached Egg, "Toast-Garashi" (Chilies & Spices) & Squash "Hash"; Monique: Sinigang with Tomato, Onions, Ginger Base & Shrimp Stock; Winner: Sarah; Eliminated: Monique
7	"The Right Stuffed"	April 14, 2022
Challenge: The chefs were given 30 minutes to make a stuffed dish.: Sarah: Rice Dumpling Stuffed with Odong & Wild Mushrooms; Jo: Caponata Stuffed Delicata Squash; Winner: Sarah; Eliminated: Jo
8	"Ghost Kitchen"	April 21, 2022
Challenge: The chefs were given 45 minutes to cook three dishes for their own ghost kitchen concepts. After time expired, the contestants delivered their meals to Tom Colicchio and Gail Simmons at a separate address for judging.: Sarah ("Jamasian" = Jamaican + Asian): First Course: Jerk Shrimp Larb; Second Course: Korean Style Fried Chicken with Curry Powder; Third Course: Pineapple, Mango & Dragonfruit with Sticky Rice Salad; Jackson (Casual Italian): First Course: Mandilli di Seta; Second Course: Chicken with Salsa Verde; Third Course: Eggplant with Tomato & Fonduta; Winner: Sarah; Eliminated: Jackson
9	"Blind Taste Test"	April 28, 2022
Challenge: The chefs first competed in a blind taste test. They were given five minutes to identify 20 different spices and herbs while blindfolded. If guessed incorrectly, the contestants were unable to use the ingredient. They then had 20 minutes to cook any dish.: Sarah: Roasted Carrots, Herbed Pesto with Pickled Carrots & Candied Almonds; Luke: Roasted Yellow & Green Cauliflower with Cauliflower & Kale Purée; Winner: Sarah; Eliminated: Luke
10	"Last Chance Kitchen Finale Pt. 1 / Pt. 2"	May 5, 2022
Challenge (Part 1): The chefs were given 30 minutes to make a dish featuring three different textures: crunchy, chewy, and creamy. Once the dishes were complete, the chefs were instructed to leave the kitchen. Tom Colicchio then had the remaining non-eliminated contestants from the main competition (Ashleigh, Buddha, Damarr, Evelyn, and Nick) vote for their favorite of the two dishes through a blind tasting. Their votes directly influenced the second part of the challenge.: Sarah: Crispy Delicata Squash with Chevre & Spicy Raisin Relish; Jae: Shrimp Boil with Andouille Potato Emulsion, Okra Kimchi & Celery Pickles; Challenge (Part 2): The chefs were allowed to create any dish of their choosing for Tom Colicchio and Shota Nakajima. Each contestant started with a 30-minute timer. They earned an additional three minutes toward their timer for every vote they received during the previous round. Ashleigh, Buddha, Damarr, Evelyn, and Nick all voted for Sarah, giving her a total of 45 minutes of cooking time. The winner returned to the main competition.: Sarah: Gnocchi Pomodoro; Jae: Sautéed Snapper with Spaghetti Squash Noodle Salad in Clam Broth; Winner: Sarah; Eliminated: Jae
