= Huso (restaurant) =

Restaurant in New York City

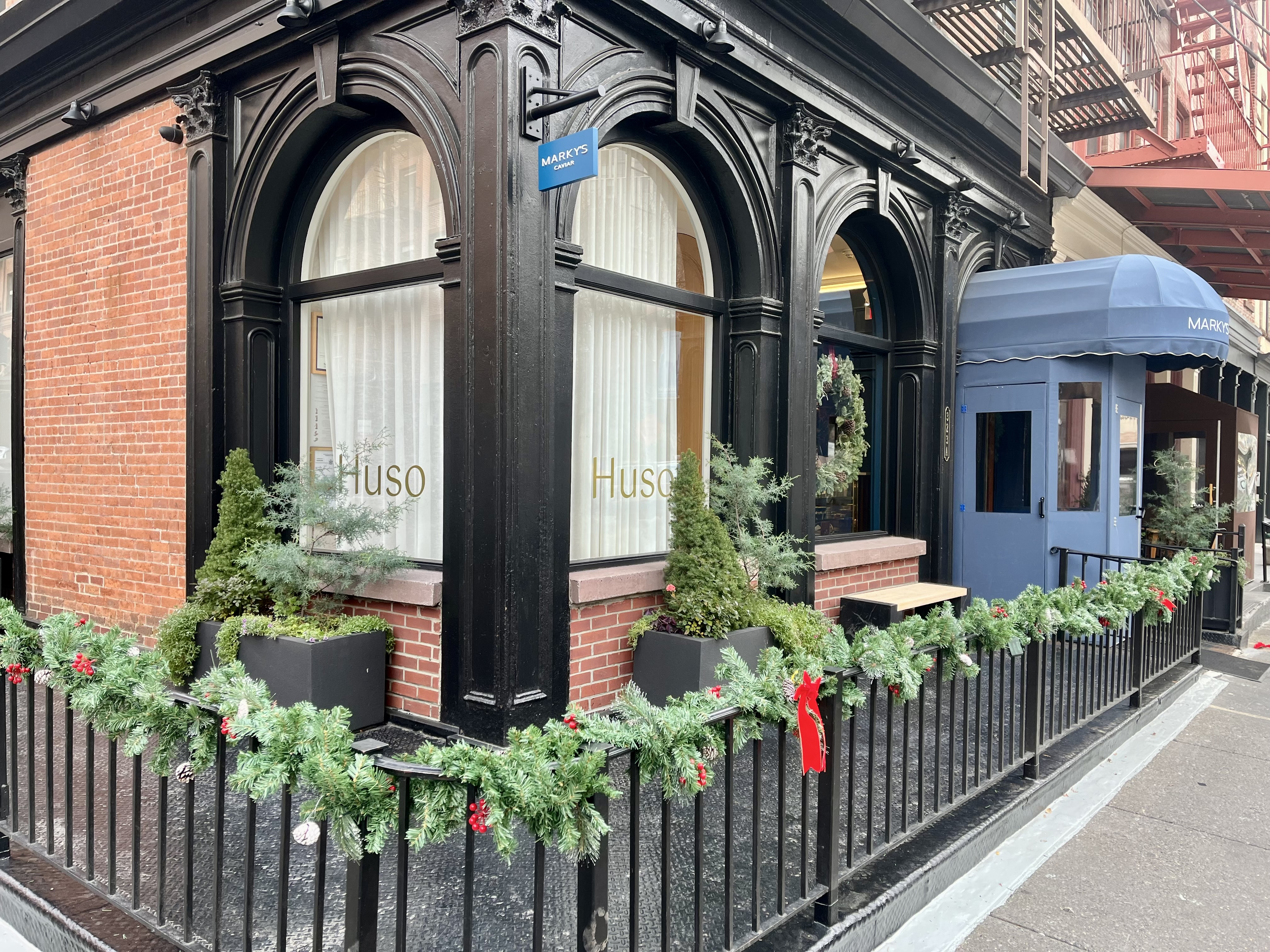
- The restaurant's exterior in 2025
- Interactive map of Huso

Restaurant information
- Established: 2023
- Owner: Buddha Lo
- Head chef: Lois Picken
- Rating: (Michelin Guide)
- Location: 323A Greenwich Street, New York, New York, United States
- Coordinates: 40°43′02″N 74°00′38″W
- Website: husony.com

Huso is a Michelin-starred restaurant located on Greenwich Street in the TriBeCa neighborhood of Lower Manhattan in New York City. The restaurant opened in 2023 on the Upper East Side and moved to TriBeCa in 2025 after a fire.

== See also ==
- List of Michelin-starred restaurants in New York City
