= Lawndale, Chicago =

Lawndale may refer to either of two neighborhoods on the far west side of the city of Chicago:

- South Lawndale, Chicago
- North Lawndale, Chicago

== See also ==
- Neighborhoods of Chicago
- Community areas of Chicago
- Lawndale (disambiguation)
