= Kristen Kish =

American chef & TV host (born 1983)

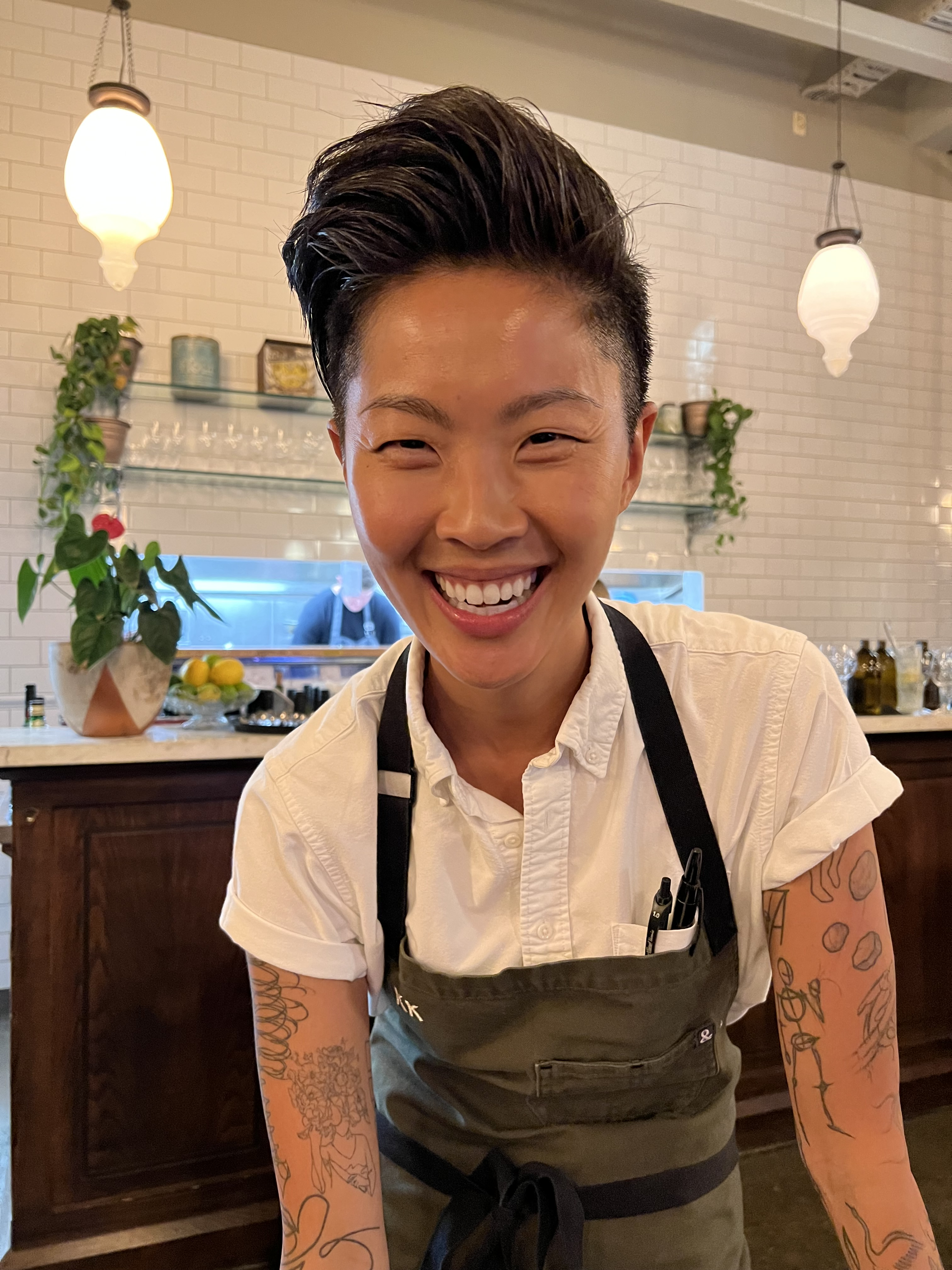
- Kristen Kish at Floriditas during Wellington On a Plate 2023
- Born: December 1, 1983 (age 42); Seoul, South Korea
- Education: Le Cordon Bleu College of Culinary Arts in Chicago
- Spouse: Bianca Dusic (m. 2021)
- Culinary career
- Current restaurant
- Arlo Grey
- Television shows
- Top Chef; 36 Hours; Fast Foodies; Iron Chef: Quest for an Iron Legend; Restaurants at the End of the World

Kristen Louise Kish (born December 1, 1983) is an American chef and television personality, best known for winning the tenth season of Top Chef. She later became the host of Top Chef starting with its twenty-first season. She has hosted a variety of other programs, including 36 Hours, Fast Foodies, Iron Chef: Quest for an Iron Legend, and Restaurants at the End of the World.

== Early life and education ==
Kish was born on December 1, 1983 in Seoul, South Korea, and adopted by a family in Kentwood, Michigan at the age of four months. She worked as a model while attending East Kentwood High School, graduating in 2002. She briefly studied international business and economics at Grand Valley State University for a year before attending Le Cordon Bleu in Chicago, earning an AA in Culinary Arts. Her culinary style is described as contemporary French cuisine with Italian influence.

== Culinary career ==
After graduating from Le Cordon Bleu in 2005, Kish worked in Chicago for two years before moving to Boston. She was a line cook at the Top of the Hub restaurant and chef de partie at Guy Martin's restaurant Sensing. In 2011, she landed a job as sous-chef at Stir, a culinary demonstration kitchen. She was promoted to Stir's chef de cuisine by the owner, Barbara Lynch, in 2012. After her appearance on Top Chef, Kish was the chef de cuisine at Lynch's restaurant Menton until 2014. In 2017, she released her first cookbook, co-authored with Meredith Erickson, titled Kristen Kish Cooking: Recipes and Techniques. In 2018, Kish became the chef and partner at her restaurant Arlo Grey in Austin, Texas. Since 2024, Kish has served as Chef-in-Residence at Auguste Escoffier School of Culinary Arts.

== Television appearances ==
In 2012, Kish competed in the tenth season of Bravo's Top Chef, which was filmed in Seattle, Washington. She initially had no interest in appearing on television but eventually agreed at Barbara Lynch's insistence. She was invited to participate in the qualifying rounds and was tasked with creating a signature soup for judge Emeril Lagasse. Kish passed the challenge and moved on into the competition proper. From there, Kish won four Elimination Challenges before being eliminated in the "Restaurant Wars" challenge (Episode 11). She was able to win her way back into the main competition with five consecutive victories in Last Chance Kitchen, making it to the finale with Brooke Williamson. Kish defeated Williamson and was crowned the Top Chef, becoming the second female winner in the series. In 2023, Kish was named the next host of Top Chef after Padma Lakshmi's decision to step away from the franchise. She has since received three Primetime Emmy Award nominations for Outstanding Host for a Reality or Reality Competition Program.

In 2015, Kish co-hosted 36 Hours, a six-episode series on the Travel Channel, with Kyle Martino, a television soccer analyst and former professional soccer player. The show, an adaptation of the New York Times travel column of the same name, followed Kish and Martino as they spent 36 hours eating, drinking, and exploring a given city. From 2021 to 2022, Kish starred in TruTV's cooking competition show Fast Foodies, alongside fellow chefs and Top Chef alumni Jeremy Ford and Justin Sutherland. In each episode, a celebrity presented their favorite fast food item. The chefs then competed in two rounds. In the first round, they tried to duplicate the dish as precisely as possible. In the second round, they re-imagined the item into an haute cuisine interpretation.

Kish served as a co-presenter, alongside Alton Brown and Mark Dacascos, on Iron Chef: Quest for an Iron Legend, the 2022 Netflix revival of the Iron Chef franchise. Kish provided running commentary with Brown on the competition and often served as the show's floor reporter, coming down to the kitchen area to check on the chefs' progress. In 2023, Kish hosted the National Geographic series Restaurants at the End of the World, where she visited restaurants in remote locations and showcased the talents of local chefs, farmers, fishers, herders, and foragers. In 2026, Kish appeared as a contestant on the fourth season of The Traitors. Designated as a Faithful, she was eliminated in the tenth episode after being "murdered" by the Traitors, placing eighth overall.

=== Filmography ===
Television
Year	Title	Role	Notes
2012	Top Chef: Seattle	Contestant	Winner
2014	Top Chef Duels	Contestant	Episode 8: "Stephanie Izard vs. Kristen Kish"
2014	Top Chef: Boston	Guest judge	Episode 1: "Sudden Death"
2015	36 Hours	Co-host	—N/a
2016	Chopped Junior	Guest judge	Season 3, Episode 9: "A Hot Minute"
2018	Girlfriends' Guide to Divorce	Self	Season 5, Episode 2: "Rule No. 149: Don't Eat the Yellow Snow"
2019	The Best Thing I Ever Ate	Self	Season 10, Episode 2: "Chocolate Bliss"; Season 10, Episode 12: "Culinary Revolutions"; Season 12, Episode 1: "Pie's the Limit"
2020	Chopped	Guest judge	Season 46, Episode 2: "Here to Persevere!"
2021	Top Chef: Portland	Guest judge	Episode 8: "Restaurant Wars"; Episode 9: "Portland-ia"; Episode 10: "Tournament of Tofu"; Episode 11: "Blind Ambitions"
2021–2022	Fast Foodies	Co-host	—N/a
2022	Top Chef: Houston	Guest judge	Episode 1: "Primal Instincts"; Episode 14: "The Final Plate"
2022	Iron Chef: Quest for an Iron Legend	Co-host	—N/a
2022	Selena + Chef	Self	Season 4, Episode 2: "Selena + Kristen Kish"
2023	Restaurants at the End of the World	Host	—N/a
2024	Top Chef: Wisconsin	Host	—N/a
2024	Top Chef Canada	Guest judge	Season 11, Episode 7: "Lights, Camera, Cooking!"
2024–2025	Top Chef: The Dish with Kish	Host	Web series
2025	Top Chef: Destination Canada	Host	—N/a
2026	The Traitors	Contestant	Season 4
2026	Top Chef: Carolinas	Host	—N/a
2026	Celebrity Wheel of Fortune	Contestant	Season 6, Episode 14: "Kristen Kish, Rashid Shaheed, Action Bronson"

== Personal life ==
In 2014, Kish publicly came out after announcing the first anniversary of the relationship with her girlfriend at the time, Jacqueline Westbrook, over Instagram. In 2019, Kish announced her engagement to Bianca Dusic in an Instagram post. They married in 2021. In 2025, Kish's memoir Accidentally on Purpose was published, becoming a New York Times Best Seller.
