= Evelyn Garcia (chef) =

American chef

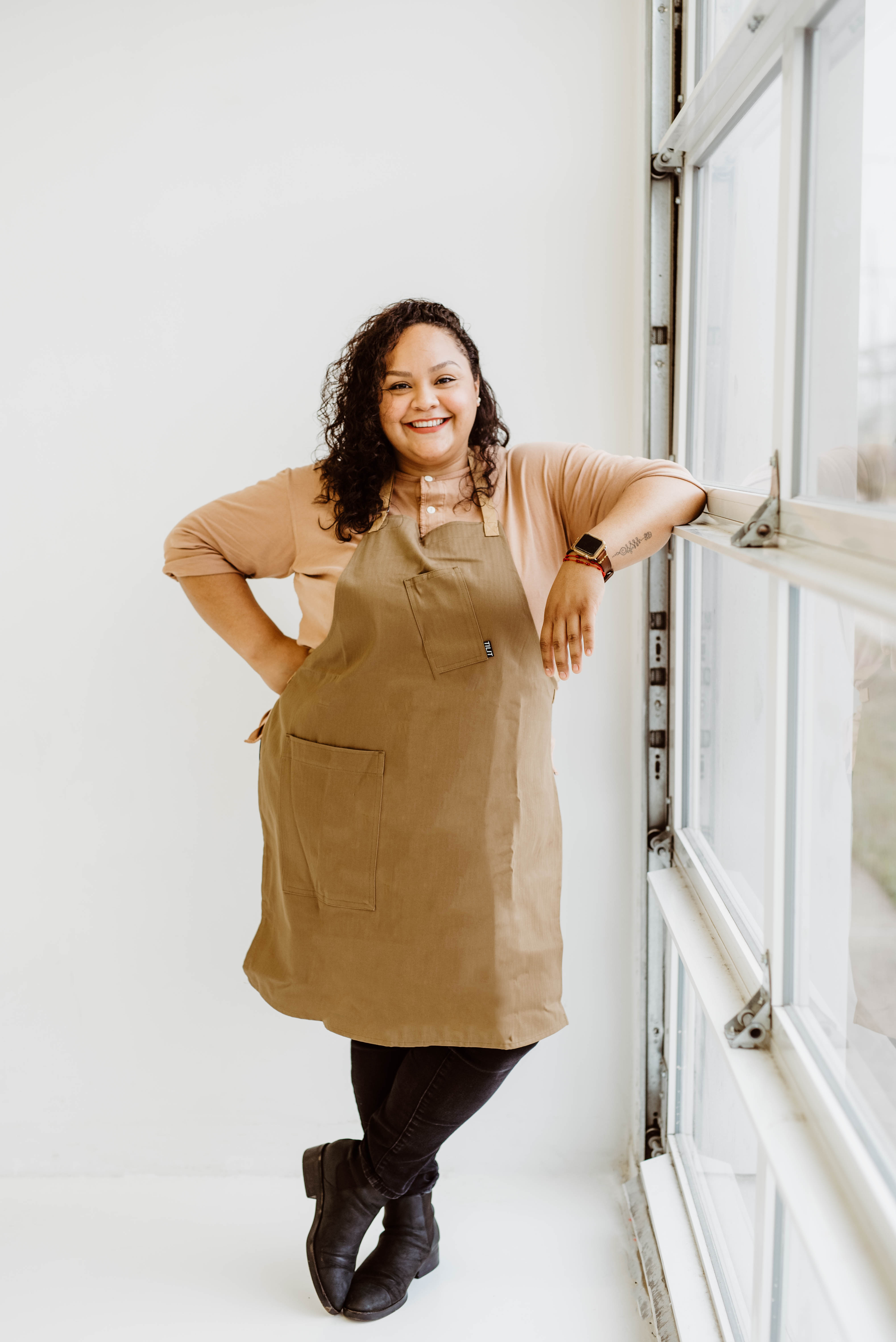
- Born: Evelyn Garcia; Houston, Texas, U.S.
- Education: The Culinary Institute of America
- Culinary career
- Current restaurant
- Kin HTX, Jun by Kin
- Website: www.chefevelyngarcia.com

Evelyn Garcia is an American chef most known for competing on the television series Top Chef: Houston.

== Early life ==
Garcia was born and raised in Houston, in the U.S. state of Texas. Her parents are from El Salvador and Mexico.

== Career ==
According to Jade Yamazaki Stewart of Eater Seattle, Garcia is "known for her creative melding of Texas and Southeast Asian cuisines". She operates the restaurant Kin (also known as Kin HTX), and has also hosted pop-up dinners and workshops. Garcia has appeared on Chopped and was a runner-up on Top Chef: Houston.

Garcia opened a new restaurant, Jūn in 2023 with fellow chef Henry Lu. In 2025, Garcia was a James Beard semi-finalist for Best Chef: Texas.

== Personal life ==
Garcia lives in Houston.

== See also ==
- List of people from Houston
- List of Top Chef contestants
