= Buddha Lo =

Australian chef

- Born: 20 August 1991 (age 35)
- Education: William Angliss Institute
- Spouse: Rebekah Pedler (m. 2018)
- Children: 2
- Culinary career
- Current restaurant: Huso
- Television show(s): Top Chef: Houston Top Chef: World All-Stars America's Culinary Cup

Kah-wai Lo (born 20 August 1991), known professionally as Buddha Lo, is an Australian chef and television personality based in New York City. He is best known for winning two consecutive seasons of the American television series Top Chef, becoming its first two-time winner. He is the executive chef and co-owner of Huso restaurant, which earned a Michelin star in 2025.

== Early life ==
Lo was born in Australia to a Hongkonger father and Malaysian mother. He was raised in Port Douglas, where his family owns a Chinese restaurant called the Jade Inn. During his childhood, he earned the nickname "Buddha" due to becoming chubby from "eating too much of [his] dad's food." Lo started working at the family restaurant at age 12. At age 14, he began a school-based culinary apprenticeship, working at a five-star hotel and resort on his weekends.

== Culinary career ==
Lo moved to Melbourne at age 17 after graduating high school, landing a job at Matteo's Restaurant and enrolling at the William Angliss Institute. While in culinary school, Lo won a scholarship for a two-month stage at the two Michelin star restaurant Café Lavinal at the Château Cordeillan-Bages hotel in Pauillac, France.

Returning to Australia, Lo was hired by Raymond Capaldi to work at his restaurant Hare & Grace, becoming its head chef by age 19. After two years with Capaldi, Lo moved to London, where he worked under Clare Smyth and Matt Abé at Restaurant Gordon Ramsay. In 2014, he received the Gordon Ramsay Excellence Award. After two years in London, Lo staged at various kitchens throughout Europe, including France, Sweden, and Copenhagen, before moving back to Melbourne. Lo was a guest chef at various events, including the Melbourne Cup and the Australian Open, and became a chef ambassador for Lavazza and Tabasco.

Lo then moved to New York City, working at Eleven Madison Park for a year. In 2019, he became the executive chef of Huso, a 12-seat, speakeasy-like tasting menu restaurant located behind Marky's Caviar retail shop on Madison Avenue. The restaurant started with little more than a single induction burner and a small oven. In February 2025, Marky's Caviar and Huso moved to Tribeca, doubling the restaurant's capacity and adding a complete kitchen. Huso was awarded its first Michelin star in November of the same year.

== Television appearances ==
In 2022, Lo was announced as a contestant on the nineteenth season of Top Chef, titled Top Chef: Houston. A longtime fan of the series, Lo started watching Top Chef at age 15, adding it to his career bucket list. Prior to filming, he binge-watched eight seasons, taking notes on past chefs' mistakes and formulating a strategy for the competition. He would eventually win the season, receiving its US$250,000 prize. Buddha dedicated his victory to his late father, Tze-Kwong "Tony" Lo, who died from cancer just two days before he got the call to appear on the show. He was then invited back to compete in the twentieth season, Top Chef: World All-Stars, which included former winners and finalists from several international editions of Top Chef. With the season set in London, Lo extensively studied British cuisine during the three months between the conclusion of Season 19’s television airing and the start of filming for Season 20. He was once again declared the winner, receiving his second US$250,000 prize and becoming the series' first repeat champion.

In 2026, Lo appeared as a contestant on the CBS reality competition show America's Culinary Cup, which featured a US$1,000,000 prize, finishing in fourth place.

== Personal life ==
Lo is married to pastry chef Rebekah Pedler. The two met while working at Hare & Grace. In June 2023, Pedler announced she was pregnant with twins. Their daughters were born in October 2023.
