= Nick Wallace (chef) =

American chef and businessman

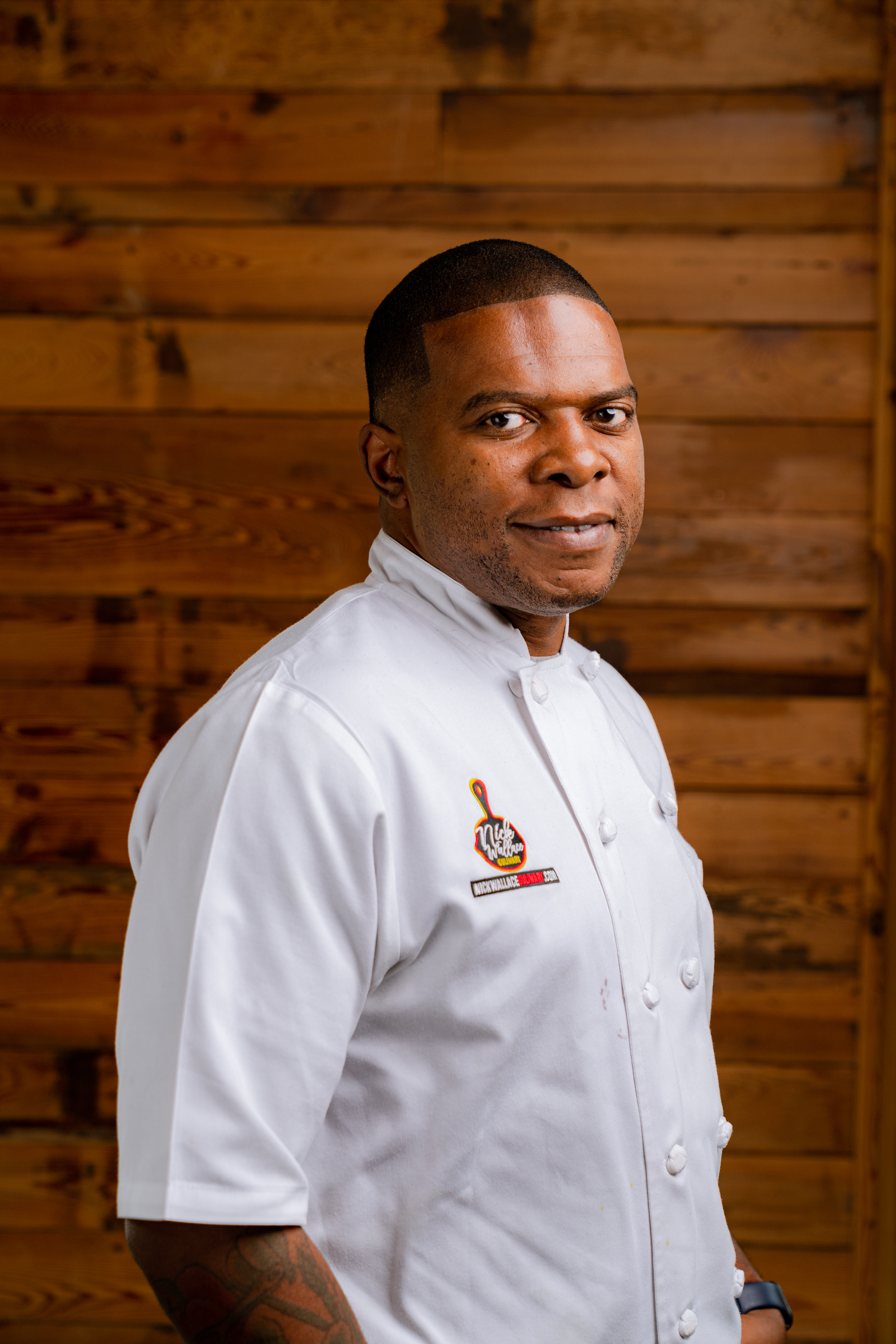
- Citizenship: United States
- Occupation: Chef
- Known for: Southern cuisine

Nick Wallace is an American chef based in Jackson, Mississippi. He is the Founder and Executive Chef of Nick Wallace Culinary, Nick Wallace Catering, and the Nissan Café by Nick Wallace. Born and raised in Mississippi, he began his culinary training at an early age in his grandmothers’ kitchens. He has been featured on notable food television programs.

== Early life ==
Wallace was born and raised in Edwards, Mississippi. He credits his grandmothers, Queen Morris and Lennel Donald, for sparking his love of the culinary arts.

== Career ==
Wallace is the Founder and Executive Chef of Nick Wallace Culinary, Nick Wallace Catering, and Nissan Café by Nick Wallace. He is also a promotional partner for Ben's Original, Pepsi, and HOPE Credit Union.

Wallace has been featured on numerous national media outlets. He has appeared on the Food Network’s Cutthroat Kitchen (2014; Season 4), Chopped (2017; Season 34), Chopped: Alton’s Challenge (2017), Comfort Nation (2018; Season 2). Wallace won his season of Chopped in 2017, and he has also appeared on the Food Network Canada's Fire Masters (2021).

Internationally, Wallace has appeared on the French channel Voyage on the show Unexplored America - Mississippi (2020). He has also been featured twice on Beautiful Destinations (2019) for Visit USA. Wallace placed fourth runner-up in Bravo’s Top Chef: Houston (2022; Season 19), and has most recently appeared on CNN's NOMAD with Carlton McCoy (2022).
