= Knife & Spoon =

Steakhouse in Orlando, Florida, U.S.

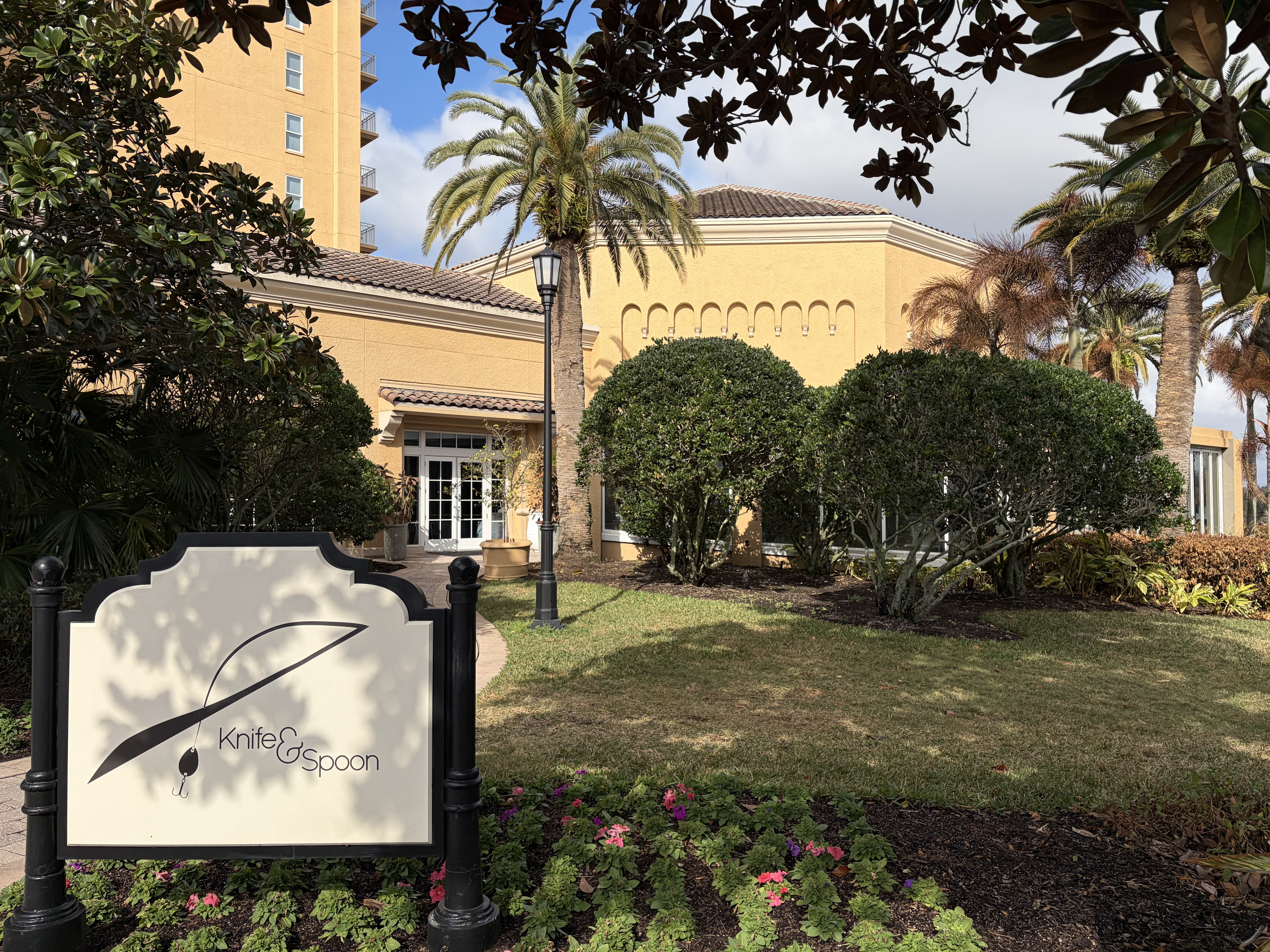
- The entrance to Knife & Spoon at the Ritz-Carlton Orlando
- Interactive map of Knife & Spoon

Restaurant information
- Head chef: John Tesar
- Food type: American
- Location: 4012 Central Florida Parkway, Orlando, Florida, 32837, United States
- Coordinates: 28°24′17″N 81°25′44″W

Knife & Spoon is a steakhouse by chef John Tesar in Orlando, Florida, United States. The restaurant serves American cuisine from the Ritz-Carlton Grande Lakes. The restaurant opened in 2020 with Gerald Sombright as the chef de cuisine. Sombright and Tesar first met during season 14 of Top Chef.

Knife & Spoon formerly held a Michelin star rating.

== See also ==
- List of Michelin starred restaurants in Florida
- List of steakhouses
