= Nina Compton =

Saint Lucian-American chef (born 1978)

- Compton at the Essence Festival in 2026
- Born: 1978 or 1979 (age 47–48)
- Education: The Culinary Institute of America at Hyde Park
- Culinary career
- Current restaurant
- Compère Lapin
- Television show
- Top Chef New Orleans
- Award
- James Beard Award 2018

Nina Compton is a Saint Lucian-American chef and restaurateur in New Orleans, Louisiana. In 2018 she won the James Beard Foundation award for Best Chef: South.

== Early life and education ==
Compton was born in Saint Lucia and grew up in the island's Moulin à Vent area. She is one of five children of Janice and Sir John George Melvin Compton, who served as Prime Minister of Saint Lucia on three occasions. She grew up cooking with her English maternal grandmother. At sixteen she left Saint Lucia to attend boarding school in England. She graduated from the Culinary Institute of America in Hyde Park in 2001.

== Career ==
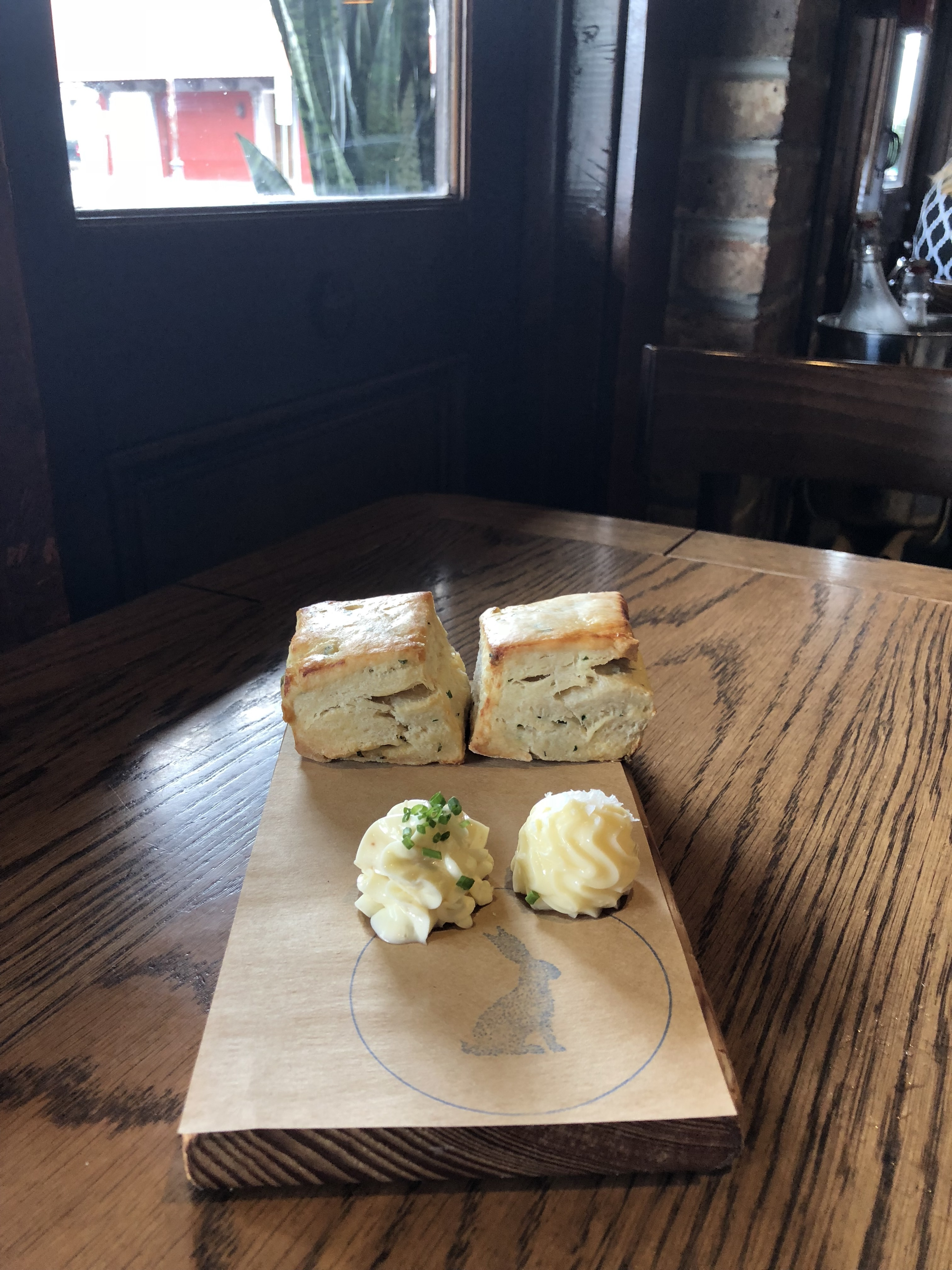
Biscuits from Compère Lapin in New Orleans, Louisiana

Compton began her career cooking at the Sandals resort in Saint Lucia, then moved to the resort's flagship in Jamaica.

She moved to Daniel in New York City, working for Daniel Boulud.

After moving to Miami, she worked for Norman Van Aken at Van Aken's Philippe Ruiz at Palme d’Or at the Biltmore Hotel. Eventually Compton moved to Casa Casuarina, a private club and boutique hotel in Miami Beach, starting as sous chef and eventually becoming executive chef.

Compton moved to Scarpetta in 2008 to work with Scott Conant opening Scarpetta at Fontainebleau Miami Beach as sous chef and eventually became chef de cuisine.

Compton competed on Season 11 of Top Chef. She was the Top Chef, Season 11 runner up and was voted fan favorite by viewers. She returned as a guest judge on several seasons.

After the Top Chef appearance, Compton and her husband and partner Larry Miller began planning to open a restaurant. Miller suggested a New Orleans site. In June 2015, Compton and Miller opened Compère Lapin. Compère Lapin serves Caribbean-style cuisine and is located in the New Orleans Central Business District. The name is a reference to Br'er Rabbit, a trickster in folktales common to both Saint Lucia and New Orleans.

In March 2018, Compton opened Bywater American Bistro in New Orleans with Miller and a third partner, chef Levi Rains. The restaurant closed in 2025.

== Recognition ==
In 2017, Compton was named Best New Chef by Food & Wine magazine. Compère Lapin was named one of America's 38 Best Restaurants by Eater that same year.

In 2018, Compton won the James Beard Foundation award for Best Chef: South.

== Books ==
- Kwéyòl/Creole: recipes, stories, and tings from a St. Lucian chef's journey. New York: Clarkson Potter/Publishers. 2025. ISBN 978-0-593-57897-1. with Osayi Endolyn

== Personal life ==
Compton is married to Larry Miller. The two met while working at Casa Casuarina in Miami.
