= Gerald Sombright =

American Michelin-starred chef

- Born: 1980 (age 45–46); St. Louis, MO
- Culinary career
- Cooking style: Specializes in dry-aged beef
- Rating: Michelin star
- Current restaurant: Dunes of Naples culinary program
- Previous restaurants: Annie Gunn's Smokehouse and Market; Ario Steakhouse; Knife & Spoon
- Television shows: Top Chef: Charleston; Food Network's The Globe; Tournament of Champions
- Award won: Level 2 WSET sommelier

Gerald Sombright (born c. 1980) from St. Louis, Missouri, is the first Black man in the United States to receive a Michelin Star. He has appeared on several shows, including Top Chef, Food Network's The Globe, and Guy Fieri's Tournament of Champions. Sombright is a contributing writer for Food & Wine magazine and has headlined a dinner at the James Beard House. As of October 25, 2025, he is one of only six Black executive chefs in the world with a Michelin Star.

== Early life and education ==
Sombright was born in St. Louis, Missouri circa 1980. He was raised by a single mother and recounts helping to make dinner on many nights. He credits helping to make dinner and being surrounded by food while at his grandmothers house for developing an interest in cooking.

== Career ==
In 1999, Chef Sombright began his career at 19 years old as a dishwasher and prep cook at the Westin Hotel St. Louis at Cupples Station. He worked through the ranks, eventually becoming chef de cuisine in his 20s. Sombright then moved on to Annie Gunn's Smokehouse and Market in St. Louis, where he worked under Chef Lou Rook. He has worked at two Four Seasons Hotels and Resorts, including the Four Seasons Baltimore and Residences where Sombright worked under Chef Clayton Miller at Wit and Wisdom, the hotel's signature restaurant, and PB&G at the Four Seasons Resort in Orlando.

In 2016, Sombright appeared on season 14 of Top Chef in Charleston, SC. He was eliminated after losing the "Sudden Death Quickfire Challenge" to John Tesar, who he would later join at Knife & Spoon. The episode was controversial with fans due to the filming location of the Sudden Death challenge, Boone Hall – a plantation. After Top Chef, Sombright began working at Ario, a steakhouse specializing in dry-aged beef, and at Tesoro, a Mediterranean restaurant that is part of the JW Marriott Marco Island Beach Resort. On July 27, 2017, the James Beard House hosted a dinner that Sombright headlined named "Beachside Glamour" Tesar and Sombright worked together several times before opening Knife & Spoon, once at a wine auction dinner that Tesar headlined and again at a dinner hosted by Ario named "Truffles on the Gulf".

In 2020, Sombright and Tesar opened Knife & Spoon in the Ritz-Carlton Orlando, Grande Lakes. In late 2022, the Dunes of Naples, a private residential community, announced that Sombright would become the head of the community's culinary operations. The role included managing the club's five restaurants: the Royal Palm Room, the Terrace, the Tiki Bar, the resort-style pool, and Sandbar. As of October 25, 2025, Sombright is a contributing writer for Food & Wine magazine, a level 2 Wine & Spirit Education Trust sommelier, and the executive chef of the Dunes of Naples culinary program.
