= Top Chef: Seattle =

Season 10 of American television series

- Season 10
- Hosted by: Padma Lakshmi
- Judges: Tom Colicchio; Gail Simmons; Emeril Lagasse; Hugh Acheson; Wolfgang Puck
- No. of contestants: 24
- Winner: Kristen Kish
- Runner-up: Brooke Williamson
- Location: Seattle, Washington
- Finals venue: Juneau, Alaska; Los Angeles, California
- Fan Favorite: Sheldon Simeon
- No. of episodes: 17

Release
- Original network: Bravo
- Original release: November 7, 2012 – February 27, 2013

Season chronology
- ← Previous; Texas Next → New Orleans

Top Chef: Seattle is the tenth season of the American reality television series Top Chef. The season premiered on November 7, 2012. The competition was initially filmed in Seattle, Washington before moving to Juneau, Alaska for three episodes, and then concluding in Los Angeles, California. Top Chef: Last Chance Kitchen, the web series introduced in the previous season which puts the eliminated contestants against each other in head-to-head challenges to battle for a chance to re-enter the main competition, also returned. The winner continued to compete in the season finale. In addition, viewers could vote each week for chefs eliminated from the Last Chance Kitchen to move on in the "Save a Chef" competition. The winner of the final vote was "saved", and earned a spot in the final round of the Last Chance Kitchen. In the season finale, Kristen Kish was declared the winner over runner-up Brooke Williamson. Sheldon Simeon was voted Fan Favorite.

== Contestants ==
The cast of Top Chef: Seattle initially consisted of 21 contestants. After the qualifying challenges in the first episode, the pool of chefs was narrowed down to 15. Former Top Chef competitors Josie Smith-Malave, Chris "CJ" Jacobson, and Stefan Richter joined the competition during the second episode.

=== Eliminated in qualifying rounds ===
Name	Hometown	Current Residence (Note: The contestants' city and state of residence during time of filming.)	Age
Tina Bourbeau	New York, New York		42
Stephanie Cmar	Boston, Massachusetts		27
Anthony Gray	Macon, Georgia	Atlanta, Georgia	35
Gina Keatley	Boston, Massachusetts	Harlem, New York	32
Daniel O'Brien	Clarkson, New York	Washington, D.C.	32
Jorel Pierce	Denver, Colorado		28

Jorel Pierce returned as Jennifer Jasinski's sous chef on the fifth season of Top Chef Masters. Stephanie Cmar returned to compete in Top Chef: New Orleans and Top Chef: All-Stars L.A..

=== Top 15 ===
Name	Hometown	Current Residence	Age
Elizabeth "Lizzie" Binder	Durban, South Africa	San Francisco, California	37
Chrissy Camba	Chicago, Illinois		31
Micah Fields	Los Angeles, California		28
Eliza Gavin	Telluride, Colorado		38
Jeffrey Jew	Washington, D.C.	St. Petersburg, Florida	34
Kristen Kish	Kentwood, Michigan	Boston, Massachusetts	28
Danyele McPherson	Waynesville, North Carolina	Dallas, Texas	31
Carla Pellegrino	Rio de Janeiro, Brazil	Las Vegas, Nevada	43
Sheldon Simeon	Hilo, Hawaii	Lahaina, Hawaii	30
John Tesar	New York, New York	Dallas, Texas	54
Josh Valentine	Del City, Oklahoma	Dallas, Texas	33
Bart Vandaele	Roeselare, Belgium	Washington, D.C.	42
Tyler Wiard	Denver, Colorado		41
Brooke Williamson	Los Angeles, California	Redondo Beach, California	34
Kuniko Yagi	Maebashi, Japan	Los Angeles, California	35

Kristen Kish and Brooke Williamson later competed in Top Chef Duels. Williamson, Sheldon Simeon, and John Tesar returned for Top Chef: Charleston. Kish took over hosting duties for Padma Lakshmi following Top Chef: World All-Stars. Outside of Top Chef, Kish competed on the fourth season of The Traitors.

=== Returning contestants ===
Name	Hometown	Current Residence	Age	Season
Chris "CJ" Jacobson	El Toro, California	Studio City, California	36	Season 3
Stefan Richter	Tampere, Finland	Santa Monica, California	40	Season 5
Josie Smith-Malave	Miami, Florida	San Francisco, California	37	Season 2

== Contestant progress ==
Episode #		2^{2}	3	4	5^{4}	6	7	8	9	10	11	12	13	14	15	16	17
Quickfire Challenge Winner(s)		John; Kuniko^{1} Sheldon^{1}	Josie	John	Bart; Sheldon	Brooke	Kristen	Micah	Micah	Brooke	N/A	Stefan^{1}	Sheldon^{1}	Sheldon^{1}	Brooke^{1}	N/A	N/A
Contestant		Elimination Challenge Results															
1	Kristen	IN	IN	WIN	IN	HIGH	WIN	IN	WIN	WIN	OUT					IN^{5}	WINNER
2	Brooke	LOW	IN	IN	LOW	WIN	HIGH	WIN	HIGH	IN	IN	LOW	WIN	WIN	WIN	IN	RUNNER-UP
3	Sheldon	HIGH	LOW	IN	IN	HIGH	HIGH	LOW	IN	WIN	WIN	HIGH	LOW	LOW	LOW	OUT	
4	Josh	IN	IN	LOW	LOW	LOW	HIGH	LOW	HIGH	HIGH	HIGH	WIN	HIGH	LOW	OUT		
5	Lizzie	IN	HIGH	HIGH	IN	IN	HIGH	HIGH	LOW	LOW	IN	HIGH	HIGH	OUT			
6	Stefan	LOW^{3}	IN	HIGH	LOW	IN	HIGH	IN	IN	IN	IN	LOW	OUT				
7	Josie	LOW^{3}	LOW	IN	IN	IN	LOW	LOW	IN	LOW	LOW	OUT					
8	Micah	IN	IN	IN	IN	LOW	LOW	HIGH	IN	OUT							
9	John	HIGH	IN	IN	LOW	HIGH	LOW	WIN	OUT								
10	Bart	LOW	IN	IN	IN	IN	LOW	OUT									
11	Danyele	IN	IN	IN	IN	LOW	OUT										
12	Eliza	IN	IN	IN	IN	OUT											
13	Tyler	IN	LOW	HIGH	OUT												
13	CJ	LOW^{3}	HIGH	LOW	OUT												
15	Carla	IN	WIN	OUT													
15	Chrissy	IN	IN	OUT													
17	Kuniko	WIN	OUT														
18	Jeffrey	OUT															

^Note 1: The chef(s) did not receive immunity for winning the Quickfire Challenge.
^Note 2: Due to the qualifying rounds, the show did not use its traditional elimination format until the second episode.
^Note 3: Former Top Chef contestants CJ, Josie, and Stefan entered the competition following the Quickfire Challenge.
^Note 4: Due to the poor quality of the dishes served in the Elimination Challenge, no winner was declared.
^Note 5: Kristen won Last Chance Kitchen and returned to the competition.

(WINNER) The chef won the season and was crowned Top Chef.
(RUNNER-UP) The chef was the runner-up for the season.
(WIN) The chef won the Elimination Challenge.
(HIGH) The chef was selected as one of the top entries in the Elimination Challenge, but did not win.
(IN) The chef was not selected as one of the top or bottom entries in the Elimination Challenge and was safe.
(LOW) The chef was selected as one of the bottom entries in the Elimination Challenge, but was not eliminated.
(OUT) The chef lost the Elimination Challenge.

== Episodes ==
No. overall	No. in season	Title	Original release date
140	1	"The Ultimate Chef Test"	November 7, 2012
Qualifying Challenge: The 21 chefs were separated into four groups and sent to the restaurants of judges Tom Colicchio, Emeril Lagasse, Wolfgang Puck, and Hugh Acheson. The judges devised their own challenges to evaluate the potential contestants and selected which chefs would compete for the Top Chef title in Seattle.: Group 1 (Colicchio): Anthony, John, Jorel, Lizzie, Micah; Eliminated: Anthony, Jorel; Group 2 (Lagasse): Jeffrey, Josh, Kristen, Stephanie, Tina; Eliminated: Stephanie, Tina; Group 3 (Puck): Carla, Chrissy, Daniel, Eliza, Kuniko, Tyler; Eliminated: Daniel; Group 4 (Acheson): Bart, Brooke, Danyele, Gina, Sheldon; Eliminated: Gina
141	2	"A Shock at the Space Needle"	November 14, 2012
Quickfire Challenge: The chefs separated themselves into teams of three and had to create a dish that highlighted the local shellfish. The winning team drew knives to determine which individual would receive immunity. Past Top Chef contestants, Chris "CJ" Jacobson, Josie Smith-Malave, and Stefan Richter officially joined the competition following the challenge.: Orange Team: Carla, Chrissy, Lizzie; Yellow Team: Danyele, Eliza, Josh; Green Team: Kristen, Micah, Tyler; Blue Team: John, Kuniko, Sheldon; Gray Team: Bart, Brooke, Jeffrey; Winner: Blue Team (Geoduck Sashimi with Ponzu, Apple & Cucumber); Elimination Challenge: Using the same teams from the Quickfire, the chefs traveled to the Space Needle to make a dish using regional ingredients.: Red Team: CJ, Josie, Stefan; Orange Team: Carla, Chrissy, Lizzie; Yellow Team: Danyele, Eliza, Josh; Green Team: Kristen, Micah, Tyler; Blue Team: John, Kuniko, Sheldon; Gray Team: Bart, Brooke, Jeffrey; Winner: Kuniko (Chili Oil Poached Cod with Dashi & Spot Prawn Shabu Shabu); Eliminated: Jeffrey (Pan Roasted Halibut with Mushrooms, English Peas, Wheat Beer & Herb Sabayon)
142	3	"Tom vs. Emeril: Turkeypocalypse"	November 21, 2012
Quickfire Challenge: The chefs were tasked with creating international dumplings, inspired by whatever country they took on a map; they had 5 minutes on an Amazon Kindle Fire to look up whatever they needed to know about their type of dumpling.: Winner: Josie (Mandu - Pork, Tofu & Shiitake Mushroom Filling); Elimination Challenge: The chefs worked in two teams, led by Tom Colicchio (Red) and Emeril Lagasse (Gray), to cook a Thanksgiving meal to benefit FareStart.: Red Team: Bart, Carla, CJ, Eliza, Josh, Lizzie, Micah, Stefan; Gray Team: Brooke, Chrissy, Danyele, John, Josie, Kristen, Kuniko, Sheldon, Tyler; Winner: Carla (Carrot Soup with Turkey Meatballs); Eliminated: Kuniko (Potato Pavé)
143	4	"'50s Food Flashback"	November 28, 2012
Quickfire Challenge: The chefs were asked to butcher a part of a whole piece of beef and cook a dish with that cut.: Winner: John (Braised Oxtails and Potato Gnocchi with Roasted Vegetables & Celery); Elimination Challenge: The chefs recreated dishes from a classic 1950's menu from the restaurant Canlis. The winner received $10,000.: Winner: Kristen (Dry-Roasted Sautéed Mushrooms with Crispy-Fried Shallots); Eliminated: Chrissy (Canlis' Special Salad); Carla (Whole Milk-Fed Squab with Red Wine Reduction)
144	5	"Pike Place Pickle"	December 5, 2012
Quickfire Challenge: The chefs paired up and created a breakfast on a stick for 50 people at Pike Place Market.: Winners: Bart, Sheldon (Green Forest Breakfast Sandwich: Eggs, Cheese, Pancetta, Bacon & Spinach); Elimination Challenge: The same teams were kept for the Elimination Challenge. The chefs were asked to create a dish, by drawing knives, to feature an ingredient created by the vendors at Pike Place Market. The winners would have received $10,000; however, due to the poor quality of the meal, the reward was pulled off the table.: Bart, Sheldon: Salmon Candy; Danyele, Lizzie: Coconut Curry Chocolate; John, Josh: Truffled Popcorn; Eliza, Josie: Cardamom Bitters; Brooke, Stefan: Rose Petal Jelly; CJ, Tyler: Spicy Dill Pickles; Kristen, Micah: Cheese Curds; Eliminated: CJ, Tyler (Pork Crumpet Burger with Fried Spicy Dill Pickles)
145	6	"Even the Famous Come Home"	December 12, 2012
Quickfire Challenge: The chefs were asked to cook a holiday-themed sweet and savory dish that reminds them of their heritage using Truvia baking blend sugar. However, there was only one knife available for all the chefs; those who needed to use it were forced to either share it or improvise using other tools or methods.: Winner: Brooke (Apple Crostata with Cheddar Cheese, Candied Pine Nuts & Apple Salad); Elimination Challenge: The chefs were tasked to cater a homecoming party for actors Anna Faris and Chris Pratt, along with their families and friends. The winner received a Toyota Prius c.: Winner: Brooke (Lamb-Stuffed Squid on Black Rice with Coconut Milk); Eliminated: Eliza (Elk Ribeye with Elk Sausage Polenta, Spiced Carrots & Huckleberry Port Sauce)
146	7	"Foiled Again"	December 19, 2012
Quickfire Challenge: All ingredients in the Top Chef pantry were completely wrapped in Reynolds Wrap aluminum foil. The chefs had 30 minutes to make whatever they wanted, with the limitation that each chef must incorporate any ingredient he or she unwrapped. In addition, all pots, pans, and bowls were off-limits; only the aluminum foil could be used as a cooking vessel.: Winner: Kristen (Almond & Chocolate Sponge Cake); Elimination Challenge: The chefs paired up and competed against each other to make dishes that featured berries from Remlinger's Farm. The winner of the Quickfire Challenge was allowed to cook by themselves. The dishes were served to 150 guests, who voted which contestant had the better dish in each head-to-head battle (below in italics). The winner received $10,000.: Danyele vs. Josh: Blueberries; Bart vs. Brooke: Blackberries; Stefan vs. John: Gooseberries; Josie vs. Lizzie: Raspberries; Micah vs. Sheldon: Strawberries; Kristen: Tayberries; Winner: Kristen (Matcha Goat Milk Custard with Macerated Tayberries); Eliminated: Danyele (Chicken Pine Nut Terrine with Blueberry Mostarda)
147	8	"Jalapeño Business"	December 26, 2012
Quickfire Challenge: The chefs were challenged to make either a hot or cold preparation of oysters that they had harvested themselves from local oyster beds in Bow, Washington. The winner received $5,000.: Winner: Micah (Crispy Fried Oysters with Arugula Salad, Hot Sauce & Lemon); Elimination Challenge: In teams of two, the chefs had to cater an after-game party for a Seattle roller derby team, the Rat City Rollergirls. The dishes each team cooked were inspired by the name of one of the rollergirls.: Josie, Bart: Teriyaki Terror; John, Brooke: Kutta Rump; Lizzie, Micah: Jalapeño Business; Kristen, Stefan: Eddie Shredder; Josh, Sheldon: Tempura Tantrum; Winners: Brooke, John (Thai Beef with Lobster Jasmine Rice & Thai Slaw); Eliminated: Bart (Steak Teriyaki with Forbidden Rice, Beet Blood & Green Papaya Salad)
148	9	"Past Suppers"	January 2, 2013
Quickfire Challenge: The chefs were tested on their knife skills. Beginning in three teams of three, the contestants had to sharpen dull knives enough to cut cleanly through paper. The two teams to finish the fastest advanced to the next round preparing 50 potatoes using the Tourné cutting method. The members of the winning team continued to the final round, competing against each other to break down the rack of two rabbits. A chef cutting themselves was treated as an automatic disqualification. The winner received a custom chef's knife from master bladesmith Bob Kramer, worth roughly $4,000, and immunity from elimination.: Winner: Micah; Elimination Challenge: Each chef cooked a dish inspired by a memorable moment from a previous season of Top Chef, but had to prepare a healthier version than the original. The winner received $15,000, and their dish would be used as inspiration for a new Top Chef Healthy Choice frozen entrée. In a surprise twist, the bottom two contestants competed head-to-head based on a memorable moment from this season: CJ's elimination in Episode 5.: Season 1: Josie - Dave saying to Tiffani "I'm not your bitch, bitch" after Restaurant Wars.; Season 2: Stefan - Marcel and Betty's fight during the TGI Fridays challenge.; Season 3: John - Howie referencing Anthony Bourdain's book at the judges' table after failing to plate part of his dish.; Season 4: Sheldon - The fight in the stew room with Spike, Antonia, Jennifer, Dale, and Lisa after Zoi's departure.; Season 5: Lizzie - Jamie making the same scallop dish from a previous episode and Fabio saying "It's Top Chef, not Top Scallop."; Season 6: Josh - The chefs cooking for 300 airmen at an Air Force base.; Season 7: Brooke - Alex winning a challenge for a dish with pea purée after Ed mysteriously lost his.; Season 8: Kristen - Carla's excitement over getting the chance to make chicken pot pie on Late Night with Jimmy Fallon.; Season 9: Micah - Beverly and Heather's fight at the judges' table.; Winner: Kristen (Poached Chicken Breast, Carrot Purée, with Garlic & Tofu Emulsion); Eliminated: John (Umami Risotto with Chicken, Salmon Roe, Burdock Root & Carrot Emulsion; Lamb Burger with Fried Egg and Spicy Pickle, Tomato & Pomegranate Salad)
149	10	"Battle Before the War"	January 9, 2013
Quickfire Challenge: The chefs had 15 minutes to prepare a dish containing ginger. The winner received immunity from elimination.: Winner: Brooke (Ginger-Caramel Squid with Fresh Lime & Chili Powder); Elimination Challenge: The chefs created a restaurant concept, and presented their concept via a representative dish at the Taste of Seattle Food Festival. The two winning chefs each received $10,000 and acted as executive chef for their teams during Restaurant Wars in the next episode. The two winners picked their teams from the other remaining contestants without knowing the results of the elimination, guaranteeing that one would be handicapped in the following challenge.: Winners: Kristen (Atelier Kwan - Onsen Egg with Camembert-Mustard Sauce & Buttered Radishes); Sheldon (Urbano - Sour Tamarind Soup with Pork Belly, Shrimp & Snapper); Eliminated: Micah (Raw - Salmon, Snapper, Hamachi, Squid, Scallop & Mackerel with Raw Vegetables)
150	11	"Restaurant Wars"	January 16, 2013
Elimination Challenge: The chefs had 48 hours to create a restaurant pop-up based on the winning concepts from the prior episode: Urbano (modern Filipino) and Atelier Kwan (reinterpreted classical French). They set up both the dining area and the kitchen area, and executed a multi-course dinner service. One member from the losing team was eligible for elimination. The winner received a Toyota Avalon.: Atelier Kwan: Brooke, Josie, Kristen, Lizzie; Charcuterie: Rabbit, Pickled Turnips & Yellow Beets in Chicken & Rabbit Broth (Lizzie); Bouillabaisse: Halibut, Dungeness Crab, Bay Scallops with Shellfish Broth (Josie); Beef Bourguignon: Braised Short Rib, Garlic Purée, Mushrooms & Carrots (Kristen); Baked Gougères, St. Agur Blue Cheese, Roasted Radish & Stone Fruit Compote (Brooke); Almond Cake Macaron with Coconut Custard & Caramel Buttercream (Kristen); Urbano: Josh, Sheldon, Stefan; Kilawen: Yellowtail with Cilantro, Spicy Chili & White Soy Sauces (Stefan); Balut: Poached Egg, Duck Confit & Foie Gras Mousse (Josh); Miki: Prawns, Tapioca Roll with Achiote (Sheldon); Adobo: Pork Belly with Mung Bean Purée & Pea Shoots Salad (Sheldon); Halo-Halo: Coconut Sorbet, Avocado Mousse, Banana & Shredded Coconut (Josh); Dark Chocolate with Macadamia Nuts, Ginger & Peppermint Oil (Stefan); Winner: Sheldon; Eliminated: Kristen
151	12	"Wolfgang Clucks"	January 23, 2013
Quickfire Challenge: The chefs had 30 minutes to create a dish to impress a sushi master. The winner received $5,000. From this point forward, the winners of the Quickfire no longer received immunity from elimination.: Winner: Stefan (Yellowtail with Grilled Shiitake & Raw Lobster with Seaweed and Unagi); Elimination Challenge: The chefs had to make a fried chicken dish for a dinner party. The winner received a year's supply of Terlato wine.: Winner: Josh (Smoked Fried Chicken with Hot Sauce & Blue Cheese); Eliminated: Josie (Chicken with Black Garlic, Cayenne, Thyme & Hot Sauce with Daikon Salad)
152	13	"Chefs at Sea"	January 30, 2013
Quickfire Challenge: The competition left Seattle and boarded a cruise ship en route to Juneau, Alaska. The chefs prepared 200 portions of a one-bite appetizer incorporating iceberg lettuce. The winner received an advantage in the following Elimination Challenge.: Winner: Sheldon (Vietnamese Lettuce Wrap with Pork, Shrimp & Pickled Iceberg Hearts); Elimination Challenge: The chefs prepared a creative reinterpretation of a surf and turf. The winner of the Quickfire Challenge was allowed to choose their two proteins first, which became off-limits to the rest of the competitors.: Winner: Brooke (Mussels & Frog Legs with Celery Root & Fennel Purée, Papadums & Shallot Chutney); Eliminated: Stefan (Braised Pork Belly with Beer Sauce, Parsnip & Eel Ravioli)
153	14	"Kings of Alaska"	February 6, 2013
Quickfire Challenge: The chefs had 30 minutes to create a dish highlighting Alaskan crab. The winner received $5,000.: Winner: Sheldon (King Crab, Dungeness Crab "Miso," Pine-Smoked Asparagus & Charred Corn); Elimination Challenge: The chefs had to make a dish using salmon and sourdough bread for the residents of Juneau. The winner received a trip for two to Costa Rica.: Winner: Brooke (Sockeye Salmon & Seafood Broth with Mustard Seed Caviar & Dill Sourdough); Eliminated: Lizzie (Citrus & Beet Glazed Salmon Slider with Poppyseed Bun & Pickles)
154	15	"Glacial Gourmand"	February 13, 2013
Quickfire Challenge: The chefs prepared a meal for the athletes training for the Iditarod using only the supplies already available at their training camp.: Winner: Brooke (Pan-Roasted Halibut, Panzanella Salad with Red Currant & Beet Vinaigrette); Elimination Challenge: The chefs cooked a dish inspired by their memory of the moment they decided to become a chef.: Winner: Brooke (Braised Chicken, Grilled Quail with Carrot Barley & Pickled Vegetables ); Eliminated: Josh (Foie Gras Three Ways: Torchon, Pan-Seared & Profiterole)
155	16	"Finale Part 1"	February 20, 2013
Elimination Challenge: After the competition moved to Los Angeles for the finale, the remaining chefs were given three hours to prepare an appetizer, a main course, and a dessert course to be served that night at Tom Colicchio's Craft restaurant. In addition, the chefs must run the kitchen during the dinner service, expedited by Colicchio himself, finishing and plating courses to order.: Eliminated: Sheldon (Sashimi Spot Prawns, Court Bouillon, Radish & Asian Herbs; Roasted Quail, Pine Nut Purée, Garam Masala & Tangerine; White Chocolate Mousse with Apple & Fennel)
156	17	"Finale Part 2"	February 27, 2013
Elimination Challenge: Cooking in an Iron Chef-style arena in front of the judges, their friends and families, and all nine previous Top Chef champions, the finalists each prepared up to five courses of a meal to be served to the judges and audience. Kristen was assisted by Josh, Lizzie, and Sheldon. Brooke was assisted by CJ, Kuniko, and Stefan. Each course would be critiqued head-to-head by the judges, who would immediately vote on a winner for the round. The first chef to win three rounds would be crowned "Top Chef".: First Course (No restriction): Brooke: Crispy Pig Ear & Chicory Salad, Six-Minute Egg, Apricot Jam & Candied Kumquats; Kristen: Chicken Liver Mousse with Frisée, Mustard, Prune, Hazelnuts & Pumpernickel; Winner: Kristen (1-0); Second Course (Scallops): Brooke: Seared Scallop with Salt Cod Purée, Speck, Black Currant & Mustard Seed Vinaigrette; Kristen: Citrus and Lavender Cured Scallop with Bitter Orange, Meyer Lemon & Apple; Winner: Brooke (1-1); Third Course (No restriction): Brooke: Vadouvan Fried Chicken Wing with Sumac Yogurt-Tahini & Pickled Kohlrabi Fattoush; Kristen: Celery Root Purée with Bone Marrow, Mushrooms, Bitter Greens & Radishes; Winner: Kristen (2-1); Fourth Course (Red Snapper): Brooke: Braised Pork Cheek & Red Snapper with Collard Green Slaw & Sorrel Purée; Kristen: Red Snapper with Leeks, Little Gem Lettuce, Tarragon, Uni & Shellfish Nage; Winner: Kristen (3-1); Runner-up: Brooke

== Last Chance Kitchen ==
No.	Title	Original air date
1	"Carla vs. Chrissy vs. Kuniko vs. Jeffrey"	November 28, 2012
Challenge: The chefs were given a chance to redeem themselves by creating a dish incorporating the same ingredients from the dishes that eliminated them.: Carla: Whole Squab with Baked Tomato & Morels; Chrissy: Canlis' Special Salad; Jeffrey: Pan-Roasted Halibut with Peas & Morels; Kuniko: Lemongrass Cream Potato Chowder; Winner: Kuniko; Eliminated: Carla, Chrissy, Jeffrey
2	"CJ and Tyler vs. Kuniko"	December 5, 2012
Challenge: The chefs were tasked with making a dessert. Because CJ and Tyler were eliminated from the main competition as a team, the two contestants had to work together to create their dish.: Kuniko: Frozen Bananas with Fruit Compote & Lemon Curd; CJ, Tyler: Hay Ice Cream with Cherry Fritter, Cherries & Arugula; Winners: CJ, Tyler; Eliminated: Kuniko; Saved: Jeffrey
3	"Eliza vs. CJ vs. Tyler"	December 12, 2012
Challenge: The chefs had to create a well-composed dish highlighting pickles and carrots.: CJ: Pan-Roasted Rainbow Trout, Carrot Purée & Charred Pickles; Tyler: Deconstructed Ceviche with Pickles & Carrots; Eliza: Brown Butter Carrot Mash, Crusted Scallops, Corn & Pickle Succotash; Winner: CJ; Eliminated: Eliza, Tyler; Saved: Kuniko
4	"Danyele vs. CJ"	December 19, 2012
Challenge: The chefs were required to make a sandwich using lunch meat.: CJ: Vietnamese-Inspired Ham & Butter Sandwich with Apple & Radicchio; Danyele Oven-Roasted Turkey, Bacon & Avocado Sandwich with Pickled Onions; Winner: CJ; Eliminated: Danyele; Saved: Kuniko
5	"Bart vs. CJ"	December 26, 2012
Challenge: The chefs had to use chicken breast to create a flavorful dish.: CJ: Marinated Chicken Breast with Mushroom Reduction, Greek Yogurt & Roasted Lettuces; Bart: Roasted Chicken with Carrots, Greek Yogurt, Tea-Infused Sauce & Speculoos Cookies; Winner: CJ; Eliminated: Bart; Saved: Kuniko
6	"John vs. CJ"	January 2, 2013
Challenge: The chefs were allowed to cook any dish, but were required to use pots and pans bought from a yard sale.: CJ: Seared Diver Scallop, Foie Gras Dashi with Mango & Caviar; John: Corn Velouté & Succotash with Roasted Lobster & Seared Foie Gras; Winner: CJ; Eliminated: John; Saved: Kuniko
7	"Micah vs. CJ"	January 9, 2013
Challenge: The chefs had to prepare their best tartare.: CJ: Beef Heart Tartare with Chili, Pickled Duck Skin & Tomato Water; Micah: Bison Carpaccio & Duck Tartare with Quail Egg Yolk, Pickled Carrots, Chilis & Arugula; Winner: CJ; Eliminated: Micah; Saved: Kuniko
8	"Kristen vs. CJ"	January 16, 2013
Challenge: The chefs got to choose an ingredient, a cuisine, and a cooking technique that they had to incorporate into their dishes, as well as a time limit. They decided that they had to prepare a French-inspired snapper dish with a smoked element in 30 minutes.: CJ: Brown Butter Snapper with Creamed Morel, Smoked Mashed Potatoes & Ratatouille; Kristen: Bouillabaisse of Snapper, Crème Fraîche, Smoked Butter, Fennel & Radish; Winner: Kristen; Eliminated: CJ; Saved: Kuniko
9	"Josie vs. Kristen"	January 23, 2013
Challenge: The chefs had to break down a salmon, portion 10 identical pieces, and create well-composed dishes for Tom and the eliminated contestants.: Kristen: Crispy Salmon with Pickled Pineapple, Raisins, Shaved Cauliflower & Crème Fraîche; Josie: Fennel Pollen Dusted Salmon with Fennel, Radish & Tarragon Salad; Winner: Kristen; Eliminated: Josie; Saved: CJ
10	"Stefan vs. Kristen"	January 30, 2013
Challenge: The chefs cooked dishes using offal.: Kristen: Chicken Livers with Garlic and Mustard Caramel, Pickled Fruit & Herb Salad; Stefan: Beuscherl of Innards with Cream Sauce, Bread Galette, Liver & Parsley Salad; Winner: Kristen; Eliminated: Stefan; Saved: CJ
11	"Lizzie vs. Kristen"	February 6, 2013
Challenge: The chefs made a dish over a campfire using Alaskan fish.: Kristen: Cod with Coconut Broth, Clam Juice, Lime, Chili-Marinated Tomato, Corn & Petite Herbs; Lizzie: Poached Salmon Stew with Fennel, Leek, Hungarian Paprika & Sweet Pepper Flakes; Winner: Kristen; Eliminated: Lizzie; Saved: Lizzie
12	"Josh vs. Lizzie vs. Kristen"	February 13, 2013
Challenge: The chefs received the simple challenge of creating a great plate of food.: Kristen: Semolina Orecchiette with Brown Butter, Pomegranate, Apple & Fresh Herbs; Josh: Venison with Coriander, Brown Sugar and Black Pepper Cure, Kale & Shaved Carrot; Lizzie: Black Cod in Black Pepper Vinegar, Savoy Cabbage & Spaetzle; Winner: Kristen; Eliminated: Josh, Lizzie
