= Salt Road Studio =

Artist-led studio in Akō, Japan

Salt Road Studio is an artist-led contemporary art studio operating between New York City and Akō, Hyōgo Prefecture, Japan. It was founded in 2026 by the American artist and curator Gina Keatley, and occupies a former kimono shop in the city. The studio states that its activities include art production, artist-led publishing, and an artist-in-residence program, and that it does not operate as a commercial gallery.

== Background ==
Salt Road Studio was established by Keatley, who had previously founded and directed Bushwick Gallery in Brooklyn, New York, and who transferred ownership of that gallery in 2026. Akō lies on the Seto Inland Sea and is historically associated with salt production, from which the studio takes its name.

According to the studio, Akō was chosen in part as an alternative to art destinations in Japan that have received greater international attention, such as Naoshima and Teshima. The city is approximately two hours from Osaka by rail.

== Seto Art Residency ==
The studio announced the Seto Art Residency at Salt Road Studio in July 2026. As announced, the program is to host three international artists for a three-week residency in June 2027, with round-trip airfare, lodging, shared studio access, and a living stipend provided. The studio states that the residency is open to artists working in painting, mixed media, photography, film, sound, collage, and cyanotype, that Japanese-language ability is not required, and that translation support is available. The residency is listed in the directory maintained by the Artist Communities Alliance.

As of August 2026, the residency has not yet taken place.

== See also ==
- Artist-in-residence
- Setouchi Triennale
