= Nourishing USA =

American non-profit organization

- Formation: 2008
- Type: Non-profit
- Headquarters: New York, NY
- Region served: USA
- Members: Over 7,500
- President & CEO: Current CEO Simon Hancock-- Past CEO Gina Keatley
- Main organ: Board of Directors
- Website: http://nourishingusa.org

Nourishing USA is a United States-based non-profit organization. It consists of a nationwide network of more than 9500 community advocates and food rescue organizations that serves in the United States as well as Puerto Rico. The organization supports approximately 500 local charitable agencies operating including pantries, soup kitchens, senior center's and emergency shelters. The current CEO Simon Hancock was appointed in January 2013. Past CEO Gina Keatley, is a 2011 CNN Hero. Nourishing USA was known as Nourishing NYC until September 2010

== History ==
In September 2010, Nourishing USA was featured on NBC San Diego at the Classy Awards, named the nationwide Charity of the Year.

In October 2010, FedEx partnered with Nourishing USA as the official sponsor of environmentally friendly shipping for all the anti-hunger advocacy kits mailed in 2010 and 2011. FedEx Express, a subsidiary of FedEx Corp uses it gasoline-electric hybrid vehicles from Azure Dynamics Corporation to deliver the kits. Most of the new FedEx gasoline-electric vehicles are in service at a Bronx, N.Y., station, making it the first FedEx all-hybrid facility with about 100 trucks.

In September 2010, the organization name was changed from Nourishing NYC to Nourishing USA. The new name conveys the mission—providing nutrition for all—and will be supported through expansive public outreach campaigns that will raise awareness and create action to stop malnourishment in low-income America.

In August 2009, Emerging New York Architects Committee (ENYA) announced that Nourishing USA had been chosen as Client for the Biennial Design Ideas Competition Program. The Harlem Edge/Cultivating Connections competition explored the redevelopment of the decommissioned Department of Sanitation marine transfer station located in the Hudson River at 135th Street. The site offered the opportunity to engage the local Harlem community with the waterfront, and echoes recent efforts by New York City to reclaim the waterfront for non-industrial use, as included Department of City Planning in its Vision 2020, the Comprehensive Waterfront Action Plan for New York City.

== Network programs ==
Nourishing USA works to connect community advocates across the country with the necessary tools and motivation to make the growth of local fresh produce free and accessible, so we can all combat the growing problem of poverty and obesity. The national office produces nutritional and culinary educational tools that spotlight aspects of malnourishment and provides information on hunger, poverty and the programs that serve vulnerable Americans.

Nourishing USA has received national attention from being featured on Dr. Oz Show in 2011, BBC World News and has been chosen as the Post Foods Charity of Choice, 2010. Nourishing USA's mission is to offer nutrition for all. In 2010 Nourishing USA helped to distribute over 25,000 pounds of fresh produce to in-need families in supermarket deserts. In addition, Nourishing USA collaborated with The New York Yankees to create the Healthy Home Plate Program designed after Nourishing USA's award-winning Junior Chef Program.
