= Top Chef: New Orleans =

Season 11 of American television series

- Season 11
- Hosted by: Padma Lakshmi
- Judges: Tom Colicchio; Gail Simmons; Emeril Lagasse; Hugh Acheson
- No. of contestants: 27
- Winner: Nicholas Elmi
- Runner-up: Nina Compton
- Location: New Orleans, Louisiana
- Finals venue: Maui
- Fan Favorite: Nina Compton
- No. of episodes: 17

Release
- Original network: Bravo
- Original release: October 2, 2013 – February 5, 2014

Season chronology
- ← Previous; Seattle Next → Boston

Top Chef: New Orleans is the eleventh season of the American reality television series Top Chef. The season was announced on May 10, 2013. Filming took place from early May through late July, beginning in New Orleans, Louisiana, and concluding in Maui. The season premiered on October 2, 2013. State and local tourism offices in Louisiana sponsored the season, paying a total of $375,000. The state contribution came from a recovery fund established by BP after the Deepwater Horizon oil spill. In addition to the return of the Last Chance Kitchen, Bravo launched a new web series called Padma's Picks. Debuting on August 14, 2013, the competition, presided over by host Padma Lakshmi, featured ten New Orleans-based chefs competing for the chance to join the official lineup of contestants and represent the city.

The final episode of the season generated controversy after head judge Tom Colicchio appeared to successfully sway the other judges into awarding the title of Top Chef to Nicholas Elmi, a contestant who had been nearly eliminated in several episodes and had temper control issues. Fan outrage led Colicchio to release the judges' scores on Twitter to justify their decision to give Elmi the victory over eventual runner-up Nina Compton, who was considered a front-runner in the competition. Compton was later voted Fan Favorite.

== Contestants ==
The cast of Top Chef: New Orleans originally consisted of 17 chefs. An additional 10 New Orleans-based chefs competed in Padma's Picks for the chance to join the main lineup of contestants; following its conclusion, Lakshmi selected Justin Devillier and Michael Sichel. Benedetto Bartolotta and Nick Lama previously competed in the fifth season of Top Chef Masters as the sous-chefs of Odette Fada and Sue Zemanick, respectively. Stephanie Cmar appeared as a contestant in Top Chef: Seattle during the qualifying rounds.

=== Eliminated in Padma's Picks ===
| Name | Current Residence (Note: The contestants' city and state of residence during time of filming.) |
|---|---|
| Benoit Angulo | New Orleans, Louisiana |
| Tres Barnard | New Orleans, Louisiana |
| Bart Bell | New Orleans, Louisiana |
| Michael Doyle | New Orleans, Louisiana |
| Nick Lama | New Orleans, Louisiana |
| Bradley McGehee | New Orleans, Louisiana |
| Casey Morvant | New Orleans, Louisiana |
| Chris Wadsworth | New Orleans, Louisiana |

=== Top 19 ===
| Name | Hometown | Current Residence (Note: The contestants' city and state of residence during time of filming.) | Age |
|---|---|---|---|
| Benedetto "Bene" Bartolotta | Astoria, New York | New York, New York | 27 |
| Ramon Bojorquez | Rio Rico, Arizona | San Diego, California | 31 |
| Janine Booth | Perth, Australia | New York, New York | 25 |
| Shirley Chung | Beijing, China | Las Vegas, Nevada | 36 |
| Jason Cichonski | Bucks County, Pennsylvania | Philadelphia, Pennsylvania | 27 |
| Stephanie Cmar | Boston, Massachusetts | | 28 |
| Nina Compton | Saint Lucia | New Orleans, Louisiana | 34 |
| Aaron Cuschieri | Livonia, Michigan | Chicago, Illinois | 29 |
| Justin Devillier | Dana Point, California | New Orleans, Louisiana | 32 |
| Nicholas Elmi | West Newbury, Massachusetts | Philadelphia, Pennsylvania | 32 |
| Carlos Gaytán | Huitzuco, Guerrero, Mexico | Chicago, Illinois | 42 |
| Brian Huskey | Pasadena, California | Los Angeles, California | 32 |
| Sara Johannes | Milwaukee, Wisconsin | Minneapolis, Minnesota | 36 |
| Louis Maldonado | Ukiah, California | Healdsburg, California | 32 |
| Travis Masar | La Junta, Colorado | Philadelphia, Pennsylvania | 27 |
| Carrie Mashaney | Carpenter, Iowa | Seattle, Washington | 35 |
| Bret Pelaggi | Norwood, Massachusetts | Miami, Florida | 34 |
| Michael Sichel | Valhalla, New York | New Orleans, Louisiana | 46 |
| Patricia "Patty" Vega | Gurabo, Puerto Rico | New York, New York | 29 |

Shirley Chung competed in Top Chef Duels, and later returned to compete in Top Chef: Charleston. Stephanie Cmar returned for Top Chef: All-Stars L.A.

== Contestant progress ==
| Episode # | | 1 | 2 | 3 | 4 | 5 | 6 | 7 | 8 | 9 | 10 | 11 | 12 | 13 | 14 | 15 | 16 | 17 |
|---|---|---|---|---|---|---|---|---|---|---|---|---|---|---|---|---|---|---|
| Quickfire Challenge Winner(s) | | N/A | Carrie | Shirley | N/A | Team; L.^{1}^{4} | Nina | Brian | Brian | N/A | Shirley | Carrie | Shirley | Nicholas | Shirley | Carlos^{1} | Nicholas^{1} | N/A |
| Contestant | | Elimination Challenge Results | | | | | | | | | | | | | | | | |
| 1 | Nicholas | IN | LOW | IN | IN | HIGH | HIGH | LOW | IN | WIN | WIN | IN | LOW | LOW | LOW | LOW | WIN | WINNER |
| 2 | Nina | WIN | IN | HIGH | HIGH | LOW | WIN | HIGH | HIGH | IN | IN | LOW | HIGH | WIN | HIGH | HIGH | IN | RUNNER-UP |
| 3 | Shirley | IN | IN | IN | WIN | IN | IN | IN | HIGH | IN | IN | WIN | IN | LOW | WIN | WIN | OUT | |
| 3 | Louis | IN | IN | LOW | IN | IN | IN | IN | OUT | | | | | | | | OUT^{5} | |
| 5 | Carlos | IN | HIGH | LOW | IN | WIN | IN | HIGH | WIN | IN | HIGH | HIGH | LOW | HIGH | HIGH | OUT | | |
| 6 | Brian | IN | HIGH | IN | IN | LOW | IN | LOW | IN | HIGH | LOW | HIGH | HIGH | HIGH | OUT | | | |
| 7 | Stephanie | IN | IN | HIGH | LOW | IN | IN | WIN | LOW | HIGH | HIGH | LOW | WIN | OUT | | | | |
| 8 | Carrie | HIGH | WIN | IN | HIGH | IN | IN | HIGH | IN | HIGH | IN | IN | OUT | | | | | |
| 9 | Justin | IN^{2} | IN | WIN | HIGH | IN | HIGH | IN | LOW | LOW | LOW | OUT | | | | | | |
| 10 | Travis | IN | HIGH | IN | LOW | WIN | LOW | LOW | IN | HIGH | OUT | | | | | | | |
| 11 | Sara | HIGH | IN | IN | LOW | IN | LOW | IN | IN | OUT | | | | | | | | |
| 12 | Patty | LOW | LOW | IN | HIGH | HIGH | IN | OUT | | | | | | | | | | |
| 13 | Bene | IN | IN | IN | LOW | LOW | OUT | | | | | | | | | | | |
| 14 | Michael | IN^{2} | IN | IN | IN | OUT | | | | | | | | | | | | |
| 15 | Janine | IN | IN | IN | OUT | | | | | | | | | | | | | |
| 16 | Bret | IN | LOW | OUT | | | | | | | | | | | | | | |
| 17 | Aaron | LOW | HIGH | OUT^{3} | | | | | | | | | | | | | | |
| 18 | Jason | IN | OUT | | | | | | | | | | | | | | | |
| 19 | Ramon | OUT | | | | | | | | | | | | | | | | |

^Note 1: The chef(s) did not receive immunity for winning the Quickfire Challenge.
^Note 2: As the winners of Padma's Picks, Justin and Michael were given immunity for the first Elimination Challenge.
^Note 3: Aaron was eliminated by placing last in the Quickfire Challenge.
^Note 4: Team Lakshmi consisted of Bene, Brian, Carlos, Nicholas, Nina, Patty, and Travis.
^Note 5: Louis won Last Chance Kitchen and returned to the competition.

(WINNER) The chef won the season and was crowned "Top Chef".
(RUNNER-UP) The chef was a runner-up for the season.
(WIN) The chef won the Elimination Challenge.
(HIGH) The chef was selected as one of the top entries in the Elimination Challenge, but did not win.
(IN) The chef was not selected as one of the top or bottom entries in the Elimination Challenge and was safe.
(LOW) The chef was selected as one of the bottom entries in the Elimination Challenge, but was not eliminated.
(OUT) The chef lost the Elimination Challenge.

== Episodes ==
| No. overall | No. in season | Title | Original release date |
|---|---|---|---|
| 157 | 1 | "Soiree in the Swamp" | October 2, 2013 |
Elimination Challenge: The chefs were sent to a swamp and asked to create a dish highlighting a Louisiana delicacy: alligator, turtle, or frog. The contestants were randomly assigned proteins by Lakshmi and Colicchio. The guests at the party voted for their favorite meals by presenting a string of Mardi Gras beads to the chefs whose dishes they liked the most. The three chefs who collected the most beads were eligible to win, while the three chefs with the fewest number were put up for elimination. The guest judge was chef Curtis Stone.: Winner: Nina (Curried Turtle Meatball, Chayote Slaw & Chutney with Raisins); Eliminated: Ramon (Braised Turtle with Thai Dashi)
| 158 | 2 | "Rebuilding New Orleans" | October 9, 2013 |
Quickfire Challenge: The chefs were given an entire night to prepare a gumbo inspired by their heritage. The guest judge was chef Leah Chase.: Winner: Carrie (Iowan-Trinidadian Gumbo with Coconut, Green Mango, and Corn Crumble); Elimination Challenge: The chefs were separated into four teams and worked in food trucks to serve lunch for Habitat for Humanity volunteers. The guest judge was chef Susan Spicer.: Red Team: Bene, Janine, Justin, Michael, Nina; Green Team: Louis, Sara, Shirley, Stephanie; Blue Team: Bret, Jason, Nicholas, Patty; Yellow Team: Aaron, Brian, Carlos, Carrie, Travis; Winner: Carrie (Beef & Pork Curry Empanadas with Watercress & Mango); Eliminated: Jason (Salmon Hand Roll with Quinoa, Honey Mustard Miso & Cucumber)
| 159 | 3 | "Commander's Palace" | October 16, 2013 |
Quickfire Challenge: The chefs were challenged to create a dish that reinvents one of four popular food trends: "eggs over everything", kale, bacon, or smoked foods. The contestants drew knives to select their trends. Revealed to be an Elimination Quickfire, the chef with the judges' least favorite dish would be sent home. The guest judge was Food & Wine editor-in-chief Dana Cowin.: Winner: Shirley (Rice Congee with Shirred Egg, Soy Sauce & Sesame Oil); Eliminated: Aaron (Fried Kale Dredged in Soy, Mirin, Rice Vinegar & Yuzu Sauce); Elimination Challenge: The chefs had to replicate classic dishes from the Commander's Palace menu.: Winner: Justin (Strawberry Trio); Eliminated: Bret (Veal Chop Tchoupitoulas)
| 160 | 4 | "Captain Vietnam" | October 23, 2013 |
Elimination Challenge: The chefs were separated into three teams to create a menu inspired by the Vietnamese influence on the shrimping industry in New Orleans. At least one dish on the menu had to feature shrimp.: Green Team: Bene, Janine, Sara, Stephanie, Travis; Orange Team: Brian, Carlos, Louis, Michael, Nicholas; Red Team: Carrie, Justin, Nina, Patty, Shirley; Winner: Shirley (Vietnamese Barbecue Shrimp with Creole Spice Butter); Eliminated: Janine (Fresh Gulf Shrimp with Ginger Vietnamese Tomato Sauce)
| 161 | 5 | "Lea Michele's Halloween Bash" | October 30, 2013 |
Quickfire Challenge: In a throwback to the Top Chef: Seattle Reynolds Wrap challenge, all ingredients and cooking utensils were completely wrapped in aluminum foil. The mothers of Padma Lakshmi and Gail Simmons, Vijaya Lakshmi and Renée Simmons, shopped for the chefs' ingredients and equipment. The contestants, split into two teams, had to create three dishes incorporating every ingredient. The winning team split $10,000.: Team Lakshmi: Bene, Brian, Carlos, Nicholas, Nina, Patty, Travis; Team Simmons: Carrie, Justin, Louis, Michael, Sara, Shirley, Stephanie; Winner: Team Lakshmi; Elimination Challenge: The chefs, separated into pairs, catered a Halloween costume party. The guest judge was actress Lea Michele.: Winners: Carlos, Travis (Dia de los Muertos: Goat Cheese Fondue with Fried Zucchini; Vegetable Ceviche); Eliminated: Michael (Bloody Eye: Yellow Arancini with Saffron & Tomato Jam)
| 162 | 6 | "Campfires, Cream Cheese and Countryside" | November 6, 2013 |
Quickfire Challenge: The chefs created dishes that highlighted the creole tomato. The guest judge was chef John Besh.: Winner: Nina (Chilled Watermelon Tomato Soup with Jalapeño, Fresh Basil & Shaved Zucchini); Elimination Challenge: The chefs had to make a dish using farm-fresh ingredients and featuring Philadelphia cream cheese. The contestants drew knives to determine their portion of the meal: appetizer, entrée, or dessert. The Quickfire winner was allowed to choose their course. The winner of the challenge received $10,000.: Winner: Nina (Crispy Zucchini Blossoms with Eggplant & Cream Cheese Purée); Eliminated: Bene (Roasted Chicken Breast Filled with Caramelized Onion & Tarragon Cream Cheese)
| 163 | 7 | "Jazz Hands" | November 13, 2013 |
Quickfire Challenge: The chefs rotated around prep stations in the kitchen in a version of musical chairs, continuing and completing the dishes that they ended up at. The guest judge was jazz trumpeter Kermit Ruffins.: Winner: Brian (Duck & Mussels with Flavors of Asia); Elimination Challenge: The chefs worked in teams to prepare potluck meals for a party hosted by Kermit Ruffins for a group of musicians.: Blue Team: Justin, Louis, Sara, Shirley; Gray Team: Brian, Nicholas, Patty, Travis; Green Team: Carlos, Carrie, Nina, Stephanie; Winner: Stephanie (Fried Baby Artichoke, Preserved Lemon & Anchovy Aioli); Eliminated: Patty (Tomato Watermelon Salad, Sichuan Pepper & Goat Cheese Espuma)
| 164 | 8 | "Piggin' Out" | November 20, 2013 |
Quickfire Challenge: The chefs prepared their own hot sauce. The guest judge was singer Dr. John.: Winner: Brian (Jalapeño & Serrano Hot Sauce with Lime & Yuzu Juices); Elimination Challenge: The chefs each prepared a dish from their portion of a whole hog, in the spirit of a Cajun boucherie, or communal slaughtering. The guest judges were chefs Toby Rodriguez and Donald Link.: Winner: Carlos (Pozole Verde with Fried Chorizo Tacos); Eliminated: Louis (Slow-Grilled Pork Leg with Spring Onions, Shiitake Mushrooms, Melted Corn & Popcorn)
| 165 | 9 | "Restaurant Wars" | December 4, 2013 |
Elimination Challenge: The chefs had 24 hours to create a pop-up restaurant. They set up both the dining area and the kitchen area, and executed a multi-course dinner service. One member from the losing team was eligible for elimination. The guest judge was restaurateur David Chang.: Fin: Brian, Carrie, Nicholas, Stephanie, Travis; First Course: Scallop Crudo, Corn & Squash Relish with Purple Corn Gel (Brian); Second Course: Sautéed Gulf Shrimp, Chickpea Purée, Oregano & Lemon (Carrie); Linguini with Caviar, Oyster Cream & Fennel (Stephanie); Roasted Black Drum, King Trumpet Mushrooms, Oxtail, Kale & Hibiscus Reduction (Nicholas); Third Course: Olive Oil Cake with Greek Yogurt, Cherries & Pistachios (Travis); Found: Carlos, Justin, Nina, Sara, Shirley; First Course: Red Snapper Crudo, Avocado Mousse, Pickled Baby Carrots & Fried Platano (Carlos); Roasted Parsnip Agnolotti, Mississippi Rabbit & Collard Greens Broth (Justin); Second Course: Olive Oil Poached Cobia, Blanched Ong Choy & Salsa Verde (Shirley); Pork Tenderloin with Sunchokes & Trumpet Royale Mushrooms (Nina); Third Course: Summer Nectarine Brown Butter Cake with Moscato Nectarine Salsa (Sara); Winner: Nicholas; Eliminated: Sara
| 166 | 10 | "Like Mama Made" | December 11, 2013 |
Quickfire Challenge: The chefs created dishes featuring Dunkin' Donuts coffee. The winner received $10,000.: Winner: Shirley (Coffee Crusted Tenderloin with Garlic Purée & Coffee Brown Butter Sauce); Elimination Challenge: The chefs created dishes that reminded them of home.: Winner: Nicholas (Ricotta Gnudi with Pancetta, Peas, Lemon & Parmesan); Eliminated: Travis (Biscuits with Maple Sage Sausage Gravy & Sour Plum Jam)
| 167 | 11 | "Giving It the College Try" | December 18, 2013 |
Quickfire Challenge: The chefs created dishes using drumsticks.: Winner: Carrie (Squab Legs Marinated in Thyme, Juniper & Cocoa Powder with Fig Mostarda); Elimination Challenge: The chefs served lunch to 500 freshman students at Louisiana State University. The winner received a brand new Toyota RAV4.: Winner: Shirley (Roast Beef with Potato Puree & Fire Roasted Tomato Relish); Eliminated: Justin (Marinated Gulf Shrimp, Cauliflower, Asparagus & Garlic Puree)
| 168 | 12 | "Mississippi Mud Bugs" | January 1, 2014 |
Quickfire Challenge: The chefs prepared their own version of a crawfish étouffée.: Winner: Shirley (Singapore Chili Crab Étouffée with Crawfish Stock, Cucumber & Egg); Elimination Challenge: The chefs had to create a dish highlighting two different types of seafood.: Winner: Stephanie (Fried Louisiana Oysters with Tuna & Pickled Beech Mushrooms); Eliminated: Carrie (Flounder Croquettes with Oyster Emulsion & Pickled Cucumbers)
| 169 | 13 | "Oui Si a Challenge" | January 8, 2014 |
Quickfire Challenge: The chefs replicated a dish prepared by Jacques Pépin (Dover Sole with Artichokes and Asparagus).: Winner: Nicholas (Poached Dover Sole with Mushroom Duxelle Stuffed Artichoke & Sautéed Asparagus); Elimination Challenge: The chefs were divided into two teams to prepare five-course tasting menus influenced by French and Spanish cuisine, respectively. The menus both featured olives, almonds, mussels, chicken, and chocolate. The French team was advised by Dominique Crenn, and the Spanish team by Julian Serrano.: French Team: Nicholas, Shirley, Stephanie; Spanish Team: Brian, Carlos, Nina; Winner: Nina (Ensaladilla Rusa with Green Olives, Gulf Shrimp & Potatoes; Ajo Blanco with Almonds, Crabs & Cherries); Eliminated: Stephanie (Pickled & Poached Mussels, Crustacean Jus & Tomate; Chicken Liver Mousse with Roasted Chicken Consomme)
| 170 | 14 | "Po' Boy Smackdown" | January 15, 2014 |
Quickfire Challenge: The chefs made gourmet po'boys. The guest judge was chef Roy Choi.: Winner: Shirley (Sauteed Catfish Po Boy with Mirin, Ginger, Garlic Glaze & Cabbage Slaw); Elimination Challenge: The chefs made dishes that represented a turning point in their career when they found their own culinary voice. The guest judge was filmmaker Jon Favreau.: Winner: Shirley (Seared Snapper with Crustacean Broth, Silken Tofu & Napa Cabbage); Eliminated: Brian (Chicken Anticucho with Twice Cooked Potatoes & Feta Walnut Pesto)
| 171 | 15 | "Leaving New Orleans" | January 22, 2014 |
Quickfire Challenge: The challenge occurred in two stages. In the first, the chefs made a one-bite dish that featured a combination of sweet, savory, sour, and spicy flavors. The chefs with the two best dishes advanced to the second stage, where they created a dish highlighting either bell pepper or eggplant. Instead of immunity, the winner received a brand new Toyota Corolla.: Winner: Carlos (Grilled Mango with Shrimp & Chili Glaze; Fried Red Bell Pepper Soup with Fennel, Basil & Onion); Elimination Challenge: The chefs created dishes inspired by their time in New Orleans.: Winner: Shirley (Black Drum with Zhenjiang Vinegar Butter Sauce, Braised Celery & Mushrooms); Eliminated: Carlos (Steamed Seafood Tamale with Saffron Cream Sauce & Pickled Okra)
| 172 | 16 | "Maui Wowie" | January 29, 2014 |
Quickfire Challenge: The chefs made dishes using Spam. Instead of immunity, the winner received $10,000.: Winner: Nicholas (Spam Broth, Pancetta, Seaweed, Dried Shrimp, Clam Juice & Quail Egg); Elimination Challenge: The chefs made dishes featuring canoe plants. Two chefs were eliminated.: Winner: Nicholas (Opakapaka with Jalapeño & Crispy Chicken Skin); Eliminated: Louis (Grilled Opah with Sweet Potato & Coconut Sauce); Shirley (Honey-Glazed Pork with Sweet Potato & Turmeric Puree)
| 173 | 17 | "Finale" | February 5, 2014 |
Elimination Challenge: The finalists, with the assistance of three sous chefs of their choosing (Jason, Louis, and Brian for Nicholas, and Shirley, Stephanie, and Travis for Nina)had to cook the best four-course meal of their lives.: Nina: Amuse-bouche: Breadfruit with Whipped Foie Gras Butter; First Course: Tuna & Escolar Tartar with Tomato Water & Jalapeño; Second Course: Roasted Goat Sugo with Orecchiette, Cherry Tomato Confit & Goat Cheese; Third Course: Swordfish with Squash Purée, Braised Kale & Smoked Onion Jus; Intermezzo: Compressed Dragon Fruit & Frozen Papaya Skewer; Dessert: Chocolate Zeppole with Macadamia Nuts & Passion Fruit Anglaise; Nicholas: First Course: Hamachi & Tuna with Green Apple Wasabi, Celery & Maui-Meyer Lemon; Second Course: Sweet Shrimp Bisque, Scallop & Daikon Noodles with Thai Basil; Third Course: Kombu Cured Duck Breast with Kabocha Squash, Hijiki & Ginger; Dessert: Caramelized White Chocolate Panna Cotta with Almond Cocoa Crumble & Tropical Fruit; Winner: Nicholas; Runner-up: Nina

== Last Chance Kitchen ==
| No. | Title | Original air date |
|---|---|---|
| 1 | "Ramon vs. Jason vs. Aaron vs. Bret vs. Janine" | October 23, 2013 |
Challenge: The chefs were allowed to cook any dish.: Aaron: Balsamic Marinated Rabbit Leg with Corn Fricassee & Creole Tomatoes; Bret: Seared Bass with Ratatouille & Mascarpone Polenta; Janine: Fried Oysters with Southern Vegetables & Creole Mustard Aioli; Jason: Suzuki Crudo with Corn, White Chocolate & Yuzu Nectarine; Ramon: Grilled Lemongrass Prawns with Kale, Nori & Peach Salad; Winner: Janine; Eliminated: Aaron, Bret, Jason, Ramon
| 2 | "Janine vs. Michael" | October 30, 2013 |
Challenge: The chefs were challenged to make risotto.: Janine: Mushroom Risotto with Mascarpone & Rosemary; Michael: Pine Nut & Thyme Risotto with Parmesan Crisp; Winner: Janine; Eliminated: Michael
| 3 | "Janine vs. Bene" | November 6, 2013 |
Challenge: The chefs made dishes using frozen and canned vegetables.: Janine: Seared Scallop with Pancetta, Minted Pea & Corn Purées; Bene: Duo of Swordfish with Sweet Pea Asparagus Purée, Pine Nuts & Raisins; Winner: Janine; Eliminated: Bene
| 4 | "Janine vs. Patty" | November 13, 2013 |
Challenge: The chefs created dishes highlighting onions. They were required to chop up a tub of onions before they could start on the challenge itself. In addition, they could not do any additional prep work once they started cooking.: Janine: Pork Loin with Apple Rolls, Goat Cheese, Bacon & Caramelized Onion; Patty: Grilled Pork Loin with Confit Potatoes, Andouille Sausage & Onions; Winner: Janine; Eliminated: Patty
| 5 | "Janine vs. Louis" | November 20, 2013 |
Challenge: The chefs were given $25 to spend at a farmers' market. They were allowed to keep only three of their purchased ingredients, and given only 20 minutes to prepare a dish.: Janine: Catfish with Potato, Asparagus & Saffron Sauce; Louis: Olive Oil Poached Prawns with Tomato & Fennel Bisque; Winner: Louis; Eliminated: Janine
| 6 | "Louis vs. Sara" | December 4, 2013 |
Challenge: The chefs made savory dishes featuring mascarpone. They were blindfolded for 10 minutes in the middle of the challenge and had to instruct a sous-chef (Jason for Louis, Janine for Sara) on how to continue preparing their dishes.: Louis: Mascarpone Poached Snapper with Beech Mushrooms, Snap Peas & Potato; Sara: Mascarpone Polenta with Agrodolce Mushrooms & Swiss Chard; Winner: Louis; Eliminated: Sara
| 7 | "Louis vs. Travis" | December 11, 2013 |
Challenge: The chefs made dishes highlighting Asian ingredients, including three out of the following: tripe, sea cucumber, Humboldt squid, chicken feet, duck feet, pork tongue, dried shrimp, and Chinese sausage. They were given 45 minutes for the challenge.: Louis: Braised Tripe, Dried Shrimp & Chinese Sausage with Bamboo Shoots & Bok Choy; Travis: Bitter Melon Soup with Squid Cakes; Winner: Louis; Eliminated: Travis
| 8 | "Louis vs. Justin" | December 18, 2013 |
Challenge: The chefs made dishes highlighting ingredients from their opponent's home region; Louis used ingredients from Louisiana, while Justin used ingredients from Northern California.: Louis: Redfish Almondine with Corn Puree & Crawfish Sauce; Justin: Grilled Sardine with Roasted Corn & Sherry Vinaigrette; Winner: Louis; Eliminated: Justin
| 9 | "Louis vs. Carrie" | January 1, 2014 |
Challenge: The chefs prepared dishes using broccoli.: Louis: Scottish Salmon, Anchovy Vierge with Broccoli Three Ways; Carrie: Roasted Broccoli Raviolini with Bagna Cauda; Winner: Louis; Eliminated: Carrie
| 10 | "Louis vs. Stephanie" | January 8, 2014 |
Challenge: The chefs each prepared a savory and a sweet beignet.: Louis: Crab & Black Garlic Beignet; Persimmon & Pine Nut Beignet; Stephanie: Andouille & Corn Beignet; White Chocolate & Cherry Beignet; Winner: Louis; Eliminated: Stephanie
| 11 | "Louis vs. Brian" | January 15, 2014 |
Challenge: The chefs made dishes using the skin and bones from various animals. They had 45 minutes to prepare their dishes.: Louis: Bouillon, Crispy Chicken Skin, Roasted Vegetables & Olive Oil Poached Egg Yolk; Brian: Seared Eggplant with Chicken Broth, Oyster Mushrooms & Chicken Skin; Winner: Louis; Eliminated: Brian
| 12 | "Louis vs. Carlos" | January 22, 2014 |
Challenge: The chefs made dishes showcasing a fresh Hawaiian fish. They had an hour to prepare their dishes, which were tasted blind by Tom Colicchio, Emeril Lagasse, and the three finalists (Nicholas, Nina, Shirley).: Louis: Braised Yellowfin Tuna with Mushrooms, Kale & Cabbage; Carlos: Mahi Mahi with Mole Manchamanteles & Taro Root; Winner: Louis; Eliminated: Carlos
