= Shirley Chung =

Chinese-American chef

- Born: 1976 or 1977 (age 49–50); Beijing, China
- Culinary career
- Current restaurant(s): Night Rooster (2026–present) Dallas, Texas
- Previous restaurants: Ms. Chi Cafe (2018–2024) Los Angeles, California; Twenty Eight (2014–2016) Los Angeles, California
- Television shows: Hell's Kitchen; Top Chef: New Orleans; Top Chef: Charleston; Tournament of Champions; Guy's Grocery Games; House of Knives

Shirley Chung (born 1976 or 1977) is a Chinese-American chef known for appearances on Top Chef: New Orleans, Top Chef: Charleston and Food Network's Tournament of Champions.

== Early life and education ==
Chung was born in Beijing, China, and immigrated to the United States with her family when she was 17 years old. She was introduced to international cuisine as a child by her grandmother Liang Si Yi, who worked as a director for the Red Cross. Chung worked for several years in Silicon Valley, after graduating with a degree in business administration. She eventually left the tech industry to attend culinary school.

== Career ==
Trained in classic French and Italian cuisine, Chung has worked and opened restaurants for chefs including José Andrés, Thomas Keller and Guy Savoy. In 2014 she opened Twenty Eight with Stacie Tran, acting as partner chef at the Irvine, California, restaurant. In 2016, she left that restaurant.

Chung opened her first restaurant, Ms. Chi Cafe, in Culver City in 2018. She spoke openly about her experiences with anti-Asian racism following the onset of the COVID-19 in order to draw attention to the impact of hate-motivated behavior on Asian Pacific American owned businesses. Ms. Chi Cafe closed in August 2024.

In addition to working in restaurants, Chung has appeared on numerous cooking-related television shows. She first appeared as a contestant on Top Chef season 11, where she finished in third place. She returned to the show during season 14, competing against winner Brooke Williamson in the finals. The pair previously competed against each other as part of Top Chef Duels, where Chung bested Williamson. In 2022, she began participating on Food Network's Tournament of Champions hosted by Guy Fieri.

== Personal life ==
Chung is married. In May 2024, Chung was diagnosed with stage four tongue cancer. She underwent chemotherapy and reported in 2025 that while she's still recovering, that the cancer is now in remission.

== Publications ==
- Chung, Shirley (2018). Chinese Heritage Cooking From My American Kitchen: Discover Authentic Flavors with Vibrant, Modern Recipes. Salem, MA: Page Street Publishing (published Oct 23, 2018). ISBN 9781624146770.
