= Brooke Williamson =

American chef

- Williamson in 2026
- Born: August 15, 1978 (age 48); Los Angeles, California
- Occupations: Chef and restaurateur
- Known for: Winning season 14 of Top Chef; Winning season 1 of Tournament of Champions

Brooke Williamson is an American chef and restaurateur. She won season 14 of the US television reality cooking competition series Top Chef and the first season of Tournament of Champions. She has owned several Los Angeles-area restaurants.

== Early life ==
Williamson was born in Los Angeles to Catherine Elliot and Keith Williamson; her parents were both artists. She had an early interest in cooking and worked as a teacher's assistant at the Epicurean Institute of Los Angeles at age 15. She graduated from Crossroads School for Arts and Sciences in 1996. She attended the University of Colorado Boulder.

== Career ==
Williamson became a sous chef at Michael's, a Santa Monica restaurant, when she was 19. In January 2001 Williamson was hired by Chris and Chantal Schaefer as executive chef of Zax in Brentwood where she met her now ex-husband Nick Roberts, who was her sous chef. That same year she cooked at the James Beard Foundation House.

In 2003, when Williamson was 24, she and Roberts opened Amuse Café. In 2010 they opened Hudson House in Redondo Beach and the Tripel in Playa del Ray, both of which they left or closed during the COVID pandemic. In 2014 they opened Playa Provisions. They've also opened Da Kikokiko and a kitchen supplies shop, Tripli-Kit. Williamson and Roberts co-own the hospitality group Company for Dinner.

== Television appearances ==
Williams has appeared twice on the cooking competition show Top Chef and won season 14, after being eliminated and returning from Last Chance Kitchen, competing against Shirley Chung in the finale. She came in second to Kristen Kish, who had also returned from Last Chance Kitchen, on season 10. In 2020 Williamson won the first Tournament of Champions cooking reality competition.

Williamson has also appeared on Top Chef Duels, Knife Fight, and Guy's Grocery Games. She served as a judge on BBQ Brawl and was host and mentor on MTV's House of Food. Since 2022, she has starred alongside Bobby Flay, Michael Voltaggio, and Tiffany Derry, then Ayesha Nurdjaja on Bobby's Triple Threat.

== Philanthropy ==
Williamson has participated in food-related philanthropic projects such as No Kid Hungry and World Central Kitchen.

== Personal life ==
Williamson was previously married to business partner, Nick Roberts. They have a son. She lives in Los Angeles' Westchester neighborhood.

As of March 2025, she is in a relationship with chef Bobby Flay.
