= Gina Keatley =

American artist, curator, nutritionist, and media personality

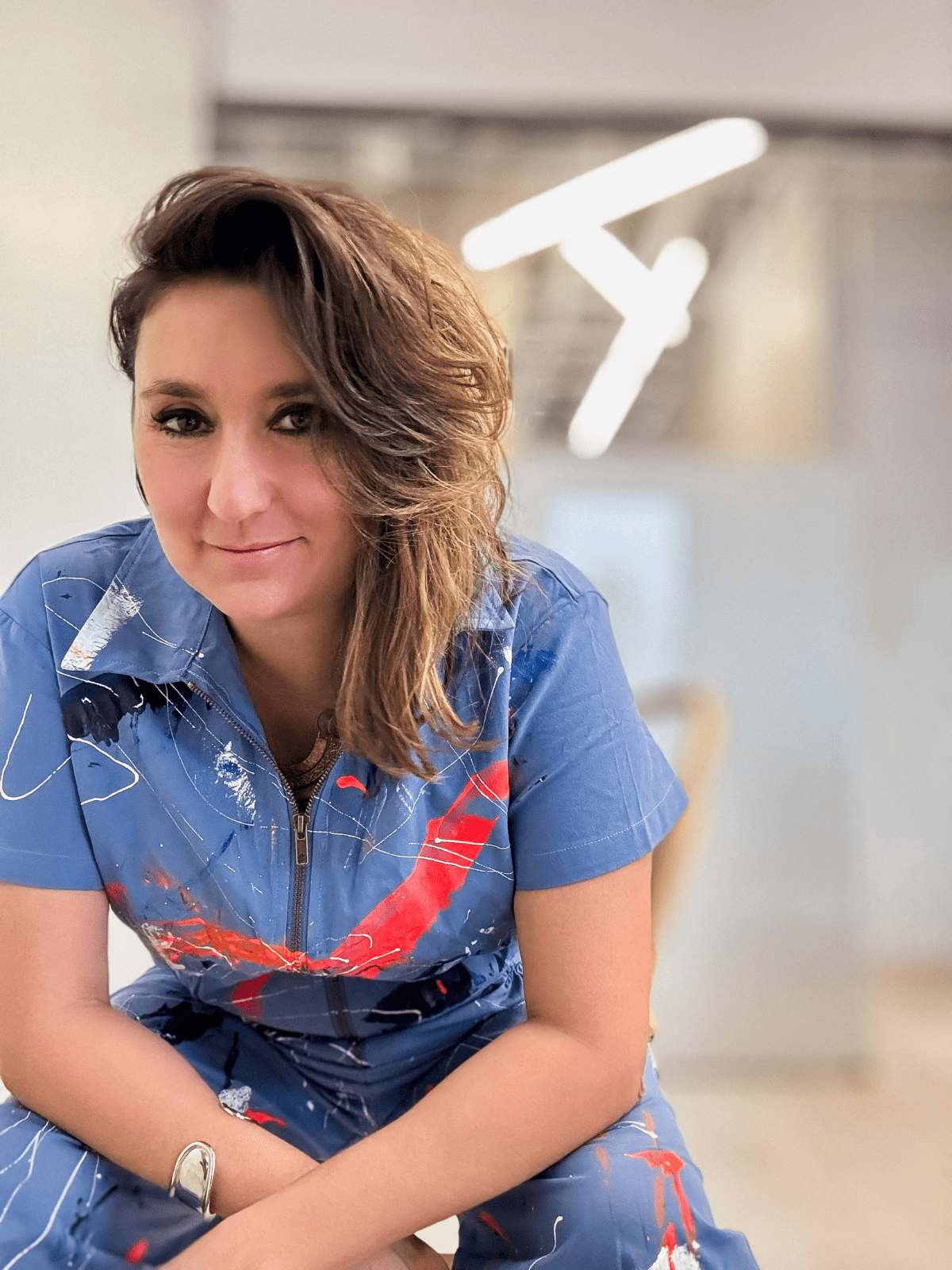
- Keatley in 2024
- Born: March 9, 1980 (age 46); Boston, Massachusetts, U.S.
- Education: New York University
- Occupations: Artist, curator, nutritionist, media personality
- Years active: 2007–present
- Known for: Bushwick Gallery; PCSFN Community Leadership Award, 2013

Gina Keatley (born March 9, 1980) is an American artist, curator, and media personality. She is the founder and director of Bushwick Gallery in Brooklyn, New York, an appointment-only gallery and creative hub that highlights both her own abstract expressionist works and those of international contemporary artists, with a curatorial philosophy emphasizing risk-taking, concept-driven programming, and creating space for artists to work beyond conventional boundaries. Keatley is also known for her earlier career as a nutritionist and television host, recognized for her food-focused programming and innovative approaches to health communication. In 2013, she was awarded the President's Council on Fitness, Sports & Nutrition Community Leadership Award for her contributions to public health.

== Career ==
In June 2007, Keatley co-founded and was CEO of Nourishing USA. In 2013, she stepped down as the CEO. Delving into urban malnourishment issues and pushing for promotion of personal responsibility for health resulted in Turner Broadcasting naming her a CNN Hero. She was named by L’Oreal as a Woman of Worth, "Special Inspiration Award" at the Inspiration Awards for Women and a Wiley College Women of Excellence Awardee.

In 2012, Keatley launched a private nutrition counseling center, Keatley Medical Nutrition Therapy. Keatley received The President's Council on Fitness, Sports & Nutrition Community Leadership Award in 2013.

In 2014, Keatley was named one of Collaborate Magazine's 40 Under 40 for her accomplishments as one of the industry's top young professionals. In 2015, Keatley became a spokesperson for "The Malaysia Kitchen for the World".

In December 2017, Keatley became a professor of International Cuisine at Queens College, City University of New York. In May 2018, Keatley facilitated the launch of SIMMER, a tech and food collaboration. In 2018, SIMMER began development of the app Hungry4Halal, a mobile application designed to help users find locations that serve halal cuisine. In January 2022, Keatley became the chief executive officer of the Sicilian Olive Leaf Tea Company and launched Matche, the world's first powdered olive leaf tea at the World Tea Conference and Expo.

On May 16, 2023, Keatley gave a TEDxCUNY Talk titled "The Journey to Finding Your Food Identity".

Beginning in January 2025, Keatley worked primarily as a visual artist. Her primary collections, the "Bone Series" and "Glimpse Series," engage themes of human emotion and natural beauty. Her art has been featured virtually in the Hamptons Fine Art Fair and Agora Gallery's Summer City Idyll.

In 2025, Keatley’s dual role as artist and gallerist was profiled in ArtRabbit. In just over a year, she produced more than 50 original works, including the Untamed Moderns, Linen, and Sow series—each reflecting a dynamic exploration of control, spontaneity, and compositional contrast. In July 2025, Keatley debuted her Miles series—large-scale abstract works themed around global emotional landscapes—at the Hamptons Fine Art Fair. Exhibiting through Bushwick Gallery (Booths 405 & 406), Keatley presented works alongside artists Beth Shaw, Jon Sarkin, Roger W. Hsia, Sherihan Khalil, and Kelly Nicole. The gallery's curation emphasized materiality, memory, and place-based intuition. Media coverage noted Keatley's presence at the fair as both an exhibiting artist and gallery director, featuring her works Cape Town, South Africa and Miles: Palermo.

Keatley's studio practice is characterized by layering, abrasion, and process-driven revision, with surfaces built to retain visible traces of decision-making. Her series include Persistent Prosecco, which explores endurance through scraped surfaces and tonal shifts; Ash and Algae, engaging opposing forces of destruction and regeneration through elemental forms; Aurora, focused on light and quiet transition; and the Linen Series, using minimal palettes to explore stillness and subtle disruption. In 2026, Keatley founded Salt Road Studio, an artist-led creative studio in a former kimono shop in Akō, Japan, operating between Akō and New York City. The studio announced the Seto Art Residency, a fully funded three-week residency for three international artists scheduled for June 2027.

In 2026, Keatley's forthcoming book Minute Muse was profiled by Fine Arts News. The book presents short artist-focused creative exercises based on art historical examples and artistic practice.

=== Television ===
Keatley has appeared on a number of cooking programs in the US, including Food Network's "Extreme Chef". In September 2012, Keatley was a contestant on the tenth season of Top Chef: Seattle. In 2013, Keatley was on HLN's "Cook Your Ass Off."

Keatley has appeared on Hallmarks Channel's show Emeril’s Table, The Dr.Oz Show, Good Day New York, The Lisa Oz Show and BBC World, and an occasional guest panelist on programs such as TED Talks.

In June 2013, Keatley joined Uncanned Productions team as Host of a new show, Healthy Soul with Gina Keatley. In November 2013, Keatley was highlighted in "Beard Foundation Honors Women in Food" article in Gotham Magazine. In 2014, Keatley was chosen as of one of five celebrity panelists for Glamour And L'Oreal Paris Top Ten College Women Panel.

In 2015, Keatley became a wellness contributing author to The Huffington Post, as well as an expert nutrition source for Yahoo Health. Keatley is executive producer of a food documentary titled Far From Healthy. In 2016, Keatley started filming Deliciously Diverse: Malaysia with Gina Keatley.

In 2017, Amazon Prime premiered Deliciously Diverse Malaysia with Gina Keatley.

== Filmography ==
Television
Year	Title	Role
2016	Deliciously Diverse: Malaysia	Herself - Host
2015	NY1	Health Contributor
2015	NY1	Nutrition Contributor
2015	Better Show	Nutrition/Culinary Guest
2015	Extra Virgin	Nutrition/Culinary Guest
2014	News 12 Brooklyn/Bronx	Nutrition/Culinary Guest
2013	Healthy Soul	Herself
2013	Cook Your Ass Off	Chef Contestant
2013	The Lisa Oz Show	Nutrition/Culinary Guest
2012	Top Chef: Seattle	Chef Contestant
2012	Craigslist Joe	Culinary Guest
2012	Ted Talks	Culinary Guest
2011	CNN Heroes: The 5th Annual CNN All-Star Tribute	Herself
2011	Food Network: Savoring Harlem	Culinary Guest
2011	Emeril's Table	Culinary Guest
2011	Food Network: Extreme Chef	Chef Contestant
2011	Fox: Good Day New York	Culinary Guest
2010	Fox: Street Talk New York	Culinary Guest
2009	The Dr. Oz Show	Herself
