= Compère Lapin =

Restaurant in New Orleans, Louisiana, U.S.

- Interactive map of Compère Lapin

Restaurant information
- Location: 535 Tchoupitoulas Street, New Orleans, Louisiana, United States
- Coordinates: 29.9479°N 90.0673°W
- Website: comperelapin.com

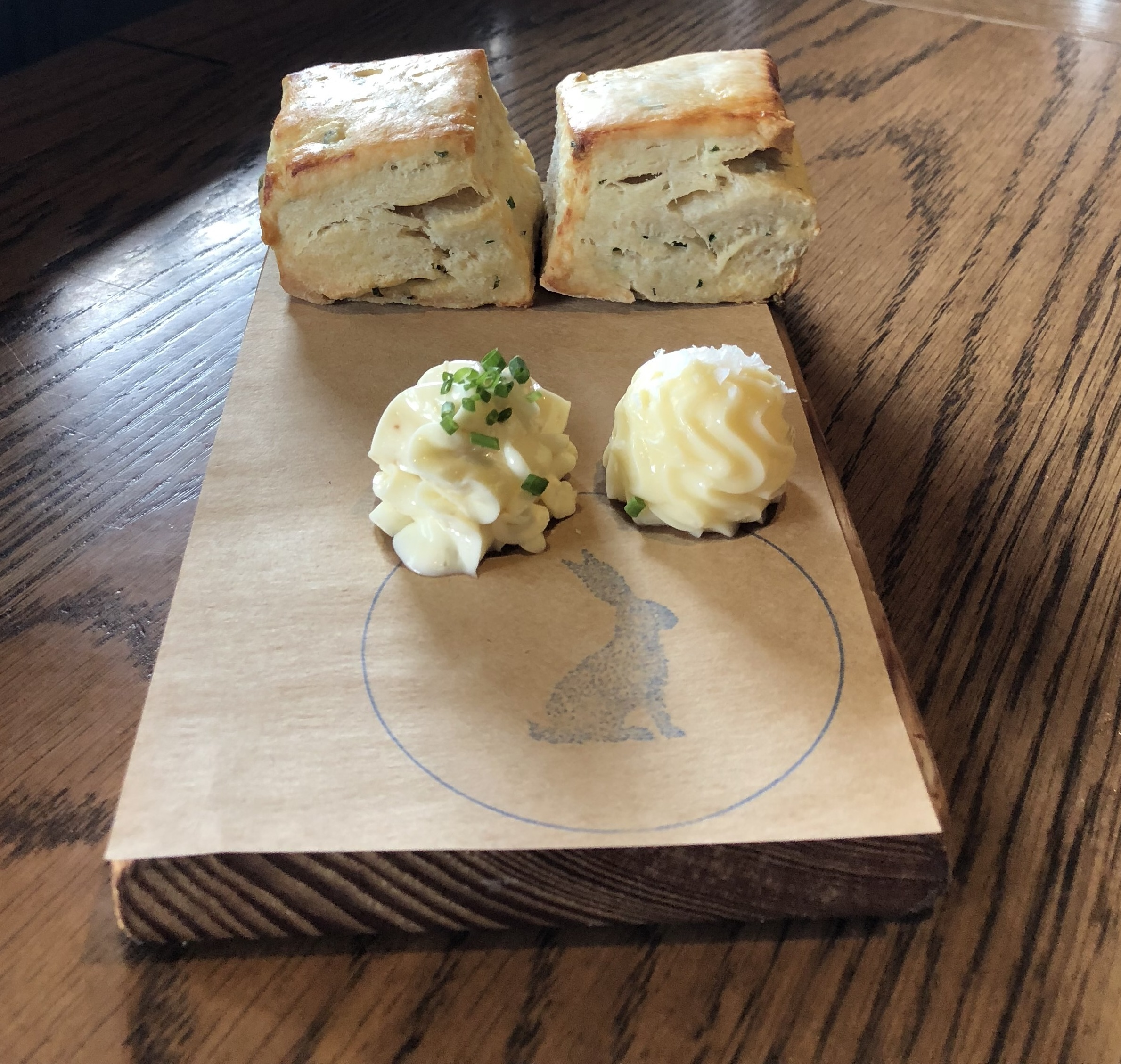
Biscuits from Compère Lapin

Compère Lapin is a restaurant in New Orleans, Louisiana, United States.

== See also ==
- List of restaurants in New Orleans
