= Four Seasons Baltimore and Residences =

Four Seasons Hotel Baltimore
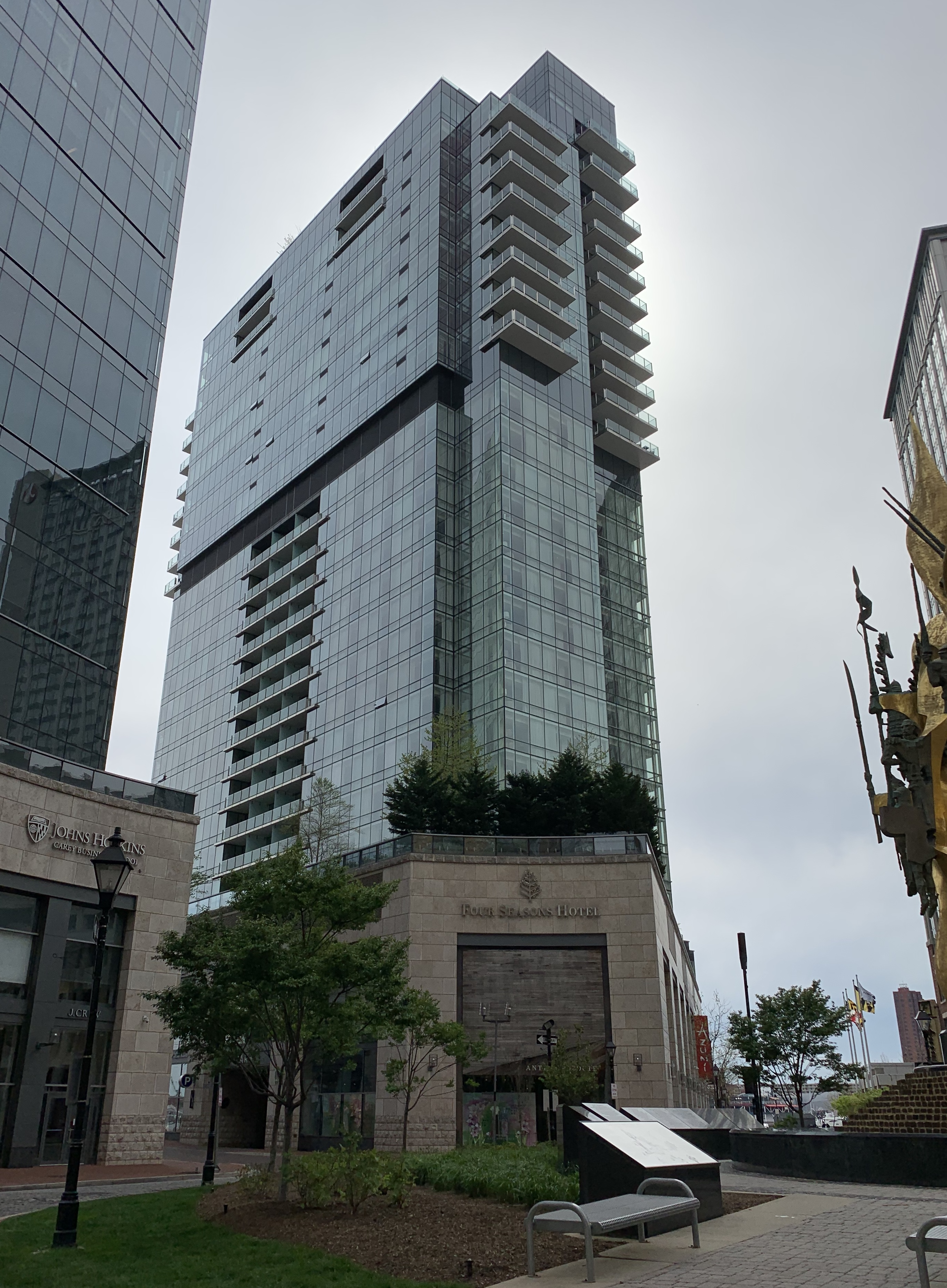
- Interactive map of the Four Seasons Hotel Baltimore area

General information
- Status: Completed
- Type: Mixed use
- Location: Baltimore, Maryland, United States
- Coordinates: 39°16′57.7″N 76°36′8″W
- Completed: Hotel:2011, Residence:2017
- Opened: November 14, 2011

Technical details
- Floor count: 30

Design and construction
- Developer: H&S Properties Development

Four Seasons Hotel Baltimore is a 30-story highrise hotel and condominium complex in Baltimore, Maryland. The hotel portion of the building opened on November 14, 2011. The building's construction began in 2007 and went through several changes. Developers originally planned the project as two towers, with a portion for residences. The hotel occupies just one of the towers, with the second being used as the Legg Mason Tower. A residential portion, comprising eight additional floors of condo units, began construction in 2014. The eight additional floors took almost four years to complete, adding an additional 62 residential units atop the existing hotel portion, separated by a mechanical floor.

Four Seasons Hotel Baltimore has a total of 256 rooms, including 45 suites, and 62 residential units. The building contains a hotel, two restaurants, a gourmet coffee shop, private residences and residential amenities, and a major retail store. The building is located in an upscale shopping and dining area of Baltimore, Harbor East.

Four Seasons Hotel Baltimore is located at 200 International Drive, overlooking the Inner Harbor. The reception desk and the lobby are on the ground floor. All the food and beverage facilities have views of the harbor through large bay windows. A function and meeting space is on the second and fourth floors. The function space includes the Grand Ballroom, the Cobalt Ballroom, eight meeting rooms and one Boardroom. The total function space, including the pre-function areas, offers over 20,000 square feet of meeting space. The spa and fitness center are on the fourth level.

== Hotel facilities ==
Wit & Wisdom, a tavern by Michael Mina, is the hotel’s signature restaurant, open for breakfast, lunch and dinner. The restaurant also features a bar area and patio seating during warmer months.

Lamill Coffee is a coffee shop serving beverages, delicacies, and lunch items.

The hotel's spa covers over 10,000 square feet and offers 11 treatment rooms, along with private men’s and women’s relaxation rooms.

Its corporate facilities includes a 5300 square foot Grand Ballroom, the dividable Cobalt Ballroom with harbor views, ten smaller meeting rooms, and a private executive boardroom.

== Pool ==
An infinity pool is located outside on the fourth floor Splash Terrace. A whirlpool and reflecting pool are located on the outdoor fifth floor Harbor Terrace Splash Pool Bar & Grill is located on the Splash Terrace.

== Private Residences ==
Upon completion of the 8 additional floors of residential units and amenity space, the complex opened an Indoor Infinity Pool, Fitness Center with included Sauna, outdoor and indoor entertainment space, and private valet/residential parking. The penthouse, a 6,500 square foot unit, sold in June 2021 for $8.0M, representing the highest single-condo transaction in city history. The vast majority of condo sales averaged greater than $1.5M.
