= Top Chef: Charleston =

Season 14 of American television series

- Season 14
- Hosted by: Padma Lakshmi
- Judges: Tom Colicchio; Gail Simmons; Graham Elliot
- No. of contestants: 16
- Winner: Brooke Williamson
- Runner-up: Shirley Chung
- Location: Charleston, South Carolina
- Finals venue: Guadalajara, Mexico, and Yucatán Peninsula
- Fan Favorite: Sheldon Simeon
- No. of episodes: 14

Release
- Original network: Bravo
- Original release: December 1, 2016 – March 2, 2017

Season chronology
- ← Previous; California Next → Colorado

Top Chef: Charleston is the fourteenth season of the American reality television series Top Chef. The season was announced by Bravo on October 13, 2016, premiered on December 1, 2016, and concluded on March 2, 2017. Filming initially took place in Charleston, South Carolina, beginning in May 2016, while the season's final episodes were filmed in areas across Mexico, including Guadalajara and the Yucatán Peninsula. Top Chef: Charleston featured eight new contestants competing against eight returning contestants from previous seasons. MasterChef and Top Chef Masters alumnus Graham Elliot debuted as a recurring judge, alongside returning judges Padma Lakshmi, Tom Colicchio, and Gail Simmons. In the season finale, Top Chef: Seattle runner-up Brooke Williamson was declared the winner over Top Chef: New Orleans finalist Shirley Chung. Top Chef: Seattle finalist Sheldon Simeon was voted Fan Favorite, his second Fan Favorite win.

== Contestants ==
Top Chef: Charleston featured a cast of 16 chefs, consisting of half rookies and half veterans.

=== New contestants ===
Name	Hometown	Current Residence (Note: The contestants' city and state of residence during time of filming.)
Silvia Barban	Castronno, Varese, Italy	Brooklyn, New York
Emily Hahn	Lynchburg, Virginia	Charleston, South Carolina
Jamie Lynch	Rochester, New York	Charlotte, North Carolina
Annie Pettry	Asheville, North Carolina	Louisville, Kentucky
Sylva Senat	Port-au-Prince, Haiti	Philadelphia, Pennsylvania
Jim Smith	Troy, Alabama	Montgomery, Alabama
Robert "BJ" Smith	South Bend, Indiana	Portland, Oregon
Gerald Sombright	St. Louis, Missouri	Marco Island, Florida

Jim Smith returned for Top Chef: Kentucky, competing in the Last Chance Kitchen. Jamie Lynch returned for Top Chef: All-Stars L.A.

=== Returning contestants ===
Name	Hometown	Current Residence	Season(s)
Amanda Baumgarten	Los Angeles, California	Chicago, Illinois	Season 7
Shirley Chung	Beijing, China	Irvine, California	Season 11
Sheldon Simeon	Hilo, Hawaii	Maui, Hawaii	Season 10
Sam Talbot	Charlotte, North Carolina	Brooklyn, New York	Season 2
Katsuji Tanabe	Mexico City, Mexico	Los Angeles, California	Season 12
John Tesar	New York, New York	Dallas, Texas	Season 10
Casey Thompson	Cedar Hill, Texas	Napa Valley, California	Season 3, 8
Brooke Williamson	Los Angeles, California		Season 10

== Contestant progress ==
Episode #		1	2	3	4	5	6	7	8	9	10	11	12	13	14
Quickfire Challenge Winner(s)		Brooke; Jim		Sheldon	Casey	Brooke	Jamie	Jamie	N/A	Brooke^{1}	Sheldon^{1}	Sheldon^{1}	Brooke^{1}	Brooke^{1}	N/A
Contestant		Elimination Challenge Results													
1	Brooke	IN		WIN	LOW	HIGH	LOW	LOW	WIN	HIGH	LOW	OUT	WIN^{6}	LOW	WINNER
2	Shirley	IN		IN	HIGH	IN	IN	WIN	HIGH	LOW	WIN	HIGH	LOW	WIN	RUNNER-UP
3	Sheldon	HIGH		IN	HIGH	HIGH	HIGH	HIGH	LOW	HIGH	HIGH	WIN	LOW	OUT	
4	John	HIGH		IN	HIGH	WIN	IN	LOW	LOW	IN	LOW	LOW	OUT		
5	Sylva	IN		HIGH	HIGH	LOW	WIN	HIGH	HIGH	WIN	OUT				
6	Casey	WIN		LOW	IN	IN	IN	LOW	LOW	LOW	OUT^{5}				
7	Emily	IN		IN	LOW	HIGH	LOW	LOW	HIGH	OUT					
8	Katsuji	IN		IN	WIN	LOW	IN	LOW	OUT						
9	Jamie	LOW		IN	HIGH	IN	IN	OUT^{4}							
10	Jim	IN		IN	LOW	IN	HIGH	OUT^{3}							
11	Amanda	IN		IN	LOW	LOW	OUT								
12	Silvia	IN		LOW	LOW	OUT									
13	BJ	LOW		LOW	OUT										
14	Sam	IN		OUT											
15	Annie	OUT													
16	Gerald	OUT^{2}													

^Note 1: The chef(s) did not receive immunity for winning the Quickfire Challenge.
^Note 2: Gerald lost the Sudden Death Quickfire Challenge and was eliminated.
^Note 3: Jim placed last in the Quickfire Challenge and was eliminated.
^Note 4: Feeling that his dish contributed the most to his team's loss, Jamie voluntarily forfeited his immunity, resulting in his elimination.
^Note 5: Casey placed last in the Quickfire Challenge and was eliminated.
^Note 6: Brooke won Last Chance Kitchen and returned to the competition.

(WINNER) The chef won the season and was crowned "Top Chef".
(RUNNER-UP) The chef was the runner-up for the season.
(WIN) The chef won the Elimination Challenge.
(HIGH) The chef was selected as one of the top entries in the Elimination Challenge but did not win.
(IN) The chef was not selected as one of the top or bottom entries in the Elimination Challenge and was safe.
(LOW) The chef was selected as one of the bottom entries in the Elimination Challenge but was not eliminated.
(OUT) The chef lost the Elimination Challenge.

== Episodes ==
No. overall	No. in season	Title	Original release date	US viewers (millions)
204	1	"Something Old, Something New"	December 1, 2016	0.80
Sudden Death Quickfire Challenge: The contestants competed in two different groups. The eight new chefs had to cook as many dishes as possible within one hour using a whole chicken, while the eight returning chefs had to create their own version of shrimp and grits. The winners of each group received immunity from elimination.: Winner: Brooke (Shrimp Scotch Egg & Grits with Lemon Fennel Salad & Espelette Pepper); Jim (Fried Chicken Innards with Aioli, Bitter Lettuces & Strawberry Vinaigrette); Sudden Death Cook-off: Gerald and John, who made the judges' least favorite dishes, competed against each other in an oyster roast-themed cook-off. The loser was immediately eliminated from the competition.; Winner: John (Cream-Poached Oysters with Truffle Butter, Hot Sauce & Shaved Truffle); Eliminated: Gerald (Roasted Oysters with Thai-Style Mignonette & Tomato Compote)
205	2	"Southern Hospitality"	December 8, 2016	0.83
Elimination Challenge: The rookies and veterans were separated into two teams. Each team dined at the home of a local Charleston chef. They then had to create a family-style meal inspired by the home-cooked dishes served to them. The guest judges for the challenge included chefs Carrie Morey, BJ Dennis, Frank Lee, Sean Brock, Robert Stehling, Kevin Johnson, and Michelle Weaver.: Winner: Casey (Collard Greens with Turnips, Coconut, Peanut, Crispy Chicken Skin, Bread Crumb & Smoked Trout Roe); Eliminated: Annie (Tomato Tart with Smoked Tomato Vinaigrette, Tomato Salad, Candied Benne & Mint)
206	3	"Choke Holds and Clammy Hands"	December 15, 2016	0.82
Quickfire Challenge: The contestants, separated into two teams, competed in the traditional mise en place relay race. The tasks involved peeling and mincing garlic, dicing onions, turning artichokes, deveining shrimp, and shucking clams; the first team to complete all five tasks could hit the opposing team's "pause button", forcing them to wait out a three-minute penalty. Once finished, each team then had to cook a dish using the prepped ingredients. The MVP from the winning team, designated by guest judge and Top Chef Masters winner Chris Cosentino, received immunity from elimination.: Winner: Sheldon; Elimination Challenge: Working in the same teams, the chefs had to create a seven-course, progressive meal for the judges and a group of select Top Chef fans; in addition, every dish had to highlight radishes. Each course was compared by the judges and guest diners in head-to-head battles. If the chef won the match-up, they earned their team one point. The first team to receive four points won the challenge. The chefs on the losing team who lost their head-to-head battles were eligible for elimination.: Winner: Brooke (Purple Daikon Panna Cotta with Sour Pineapple Curd, White Chocolate Pop Rocks & Pineapple Black Radish Juice); Eliminated: Sam (Radish Bánh Mì with Brioche & Crispy Chicken Skin)
207	4	"The Feast of Seven Trash Fishes"	December 22, 2016	0.78
Quickfire Challenge: The chefs had to create dishes using a bizarre collection of tools and ingredients packaged within gift boxes, including a pressure cooker, Patrón tequila, pomegranate, chocolate pretzels, cloves, wasabi, squab, and a melon baller; the winner received immunity from elimination. The guest judge for the challenge was Food & Wine editor-in-chief Nilou Motamed.: Winner: Casey (Smoked Chili, Tequila & Squab Soup with Squash, Roasted Chili, Peanuts & Compressed Pineapple); Elimination Challenge: Split into pairs, the contestants had to create a meal based on the Feast of the Seven Fishes using "trash fish". Each pair was randomly assigned a trash fish through knife draw; the types of fish included amberjack, mullet, tunny, blackbelly rosefish, barrel fish, triggerfish, and gray tilefish. As the winner of the Quickfire Challenge, Casey was able to work alone and choose the fish for her dish. The guest judge for the challenge was chef Mike Lata.: Winner: Katsuji (Triggerfish with Chili Sauce, Fennel Purée, Bottarga & Garlic Breadcrumbs, Stewed Tomatoes); Eliminated: BJ (Barrel Fish Brodo with Leeks, Kale, Cauliflower & Pane Carasau)
208	5	"Smoke 'Em If You Got 'Em"	December 29, 2016	0.97
Quickfire Challenge: The chefs walked into an empty Top Chef kitchen; shortly thereafter, the challenge clock began to count down and the doors to the kitchen pantry opened. Without further instructions, the chefs had to surmise the challenge requirements based on the ingredients located in the pantry. Once time expired, Lakshmi returned to inform the contestants that the challenge was to create their own take on a biscuit; the winner received immunity from elimination. The guest judge for the challenge was chef John Currence.: Winner: Brooke (Black Pepper & Poppy Seed Biscuit with Smoked Salmon Salad & Avocado Mousse); Elimination Challenge: The chefs, split into three teams, had to work through the night to prepare a whole hog barbecue. Each team was required to serve their hog with either a vinegar or mustard-based sauce, as well as create three side dishes for their meal. The guest judges for the challenge were pitmaster Rodney Scott and country singer Darius Rucker.: Winner: John (Smoked Mac & Cheese); Eliminated: Silvia (Italian Potato Salad)
209	6	"A Southern Legend"	January 5, 2017	1.06
Quickfire Challenge: The chefs were tasked with creating vegetarian versions of traditional comfort foods. In addition, following the theme of health and physical activity, the contestants were allowed to grab only one ingredient or cooking utensil at a time, forcing them to run between the kitchen and pantry; the winner received immunity from elimination. The guest judge for the challenge was U.S. Surgeon General Vivek Murthy.: Winner: Jamie (Tofu Sloppy Joe with Bell Peppers, Onions & Side Salad); Elimination Challenge: The chefs created dishes paying homage to Edna Lewis, a pioneer of Southern cuisine. The luncheon was served at Middleton Place to a table of guest judges, including Alexander Smalls, Art Smith, BJ Dennis, Glenn Roberts, Irv Miller, Mashama Bailey, Nathalie Dupree, and Toni Tipton-Martin.: Winner: Sylva (Skillet-Fried Snapper with Garden Vegetables & Vegetable Broth); Eliminated: Amanda (Roast Duck with Sweet Potatoes, Dandelion Greens, Spiced Pecans & Balsamic Onions)
210	7	"Booty"	January 12, 2017	1.06
Sudden Death Quickfire Challenge: The chefs had to create a dish using ingredients and cooking techniques inspired by the elements (earth, air, fire, or water) corresponding to their zodiac signs; the winner received immunity from elimination. The guest judge for the challenge was chef Michael Cimarusti.: Winner: Jamie (Fire: Dusted Lamb Chop with Fire-Roasted Pepper Salad & Toasted Cashew Jus); Sudden Death Cook-off: Emily, Jim, and Sylva, who made the judges' least favorite dishes, had to cook using the ingredients assigned to the earth element, which had not been used during the initial Quickfire Challenge. Before cooking, the participants had to agree upon a single dish to make for the judges; they chose to prepare steak tartare. The loser was immediately eliminated from the competition.; Eliminated: Jim (Steak Tartare with Arugula Purée, Egg Yolk Purée, Lemon, Olive Oil & Chive); Elimination Challenge: The chefs, working in teams of three, hosted a pirate-themed party inspired by Blackbeard's exploits in Charleston. However, in order to collect ingredients, each team was given a map of the city which they had to use to find seven treasure chests, each filled with a choice of three ingredients; the ingredients were available on a first-come, first-served basis. The teams were required to collect ingredients from all seven chests before they could return to the Top Chef kitchen and begin cooking.: Winner: Shirley ("Crewman Stew" with Mussels, Roasted Bell Pepper, Farro & Bacon); Eliminated: Jamie (Chicken Satay with Pickled Fennel & Orange Salad) (Note: Feeling responsible for his team's loss, Jamie opted to forfeit his immunity earned in the Quickfire Challenge. As a result, he was eliminated from the competition, sparing Emily.)
211	8	"Restaurant Wars"	January 19, 2017	1.01
Elimination Challenge: The chefs competed in Top Chef's traditional Restaurant Wars challenge. The contestants, split into two teams, were responsible for transforming an empty space into a fully functioning pop-up restaurant within 24 hours. Unlike past seasons, the teams took turns transforming the same space, serving their meals on two different days. The guest judges for the challenge were chef Daniel Humm and restaurateur Will Guidara.: Latitude: Brooke, Emily, Shirley, Sylva; First Course: Cured King Salmon with Pickled Kohlrabi, Marcona Almonds & Tiger Milk (Brooke) or Squid Ink Tagliatelle with Calamari, Lemon Bread Crumbs & Shrimp Butter (Emily); Second Course: Snapper with Bone Broth, Chile de Árbol & Wild Mushrooms (Shirley) or Pan-Roasted Halibut with Fennel Dust, Mushroom Rice & Tomato Chutney (Sylva); Third Course: Poppy Seed Buttermilk Cake with Miso Butterscotch, Pistachios & Blackberries (Emily) or Plum Wine Panna Cotta with Cherries, Toasted Cashews, Tarragon & Freeze-Dried Lychee (Shirley); Southern Belle: Casey, John, Katsuji, Sheldon; First Course: Sweet Potato Tamale with Charred Chili Onion Relish (Katsuji) or Crab "Pimento Cheese" with Benne Seed Cracker (John); Second Course: Fried Green Tomato & Almond Gravy Beef Tongue with Green Olives & Tomatoes (Katsuji) or Acorn Squash Stew with Sorghum Cod & Eggplant Crumble (Sheldon); Third Course: Blackberry Cobbler with Patrón Whipped Cream (Katsuji) or Strawberry Lemon Sorbet with Buttermilk Curd, Meringue & Roasted Strawberry (Casey); Winning Team: Latitude; Winner: Brooke; Eliminated: Katsuji
212	9	"For the Kids"	January 26, 2017	1.13
Quickfire Challenge: The chefs competed in a blindfolded taste test; they had 5 minutes to identify as many ingredients as possible, out of 20. Beginning with this episode, immunity was no longer awarded to the winner of the Quickfire Challenge. Instead, the winner received 14 cases of Terlato wine. The guest judge for the challenge was Top Chef: Las Vegas winner Michael Voltaggio.: Winner: Brooke; Elimination Challenge: The chefs drew inspiration from their favorite childhood memories to create dishes for the MUSC Shawn Jenkins Children's Hospital charity gala.: Winner: Sylva (Island Beef "Lollipop" with Ground Rib Eye, Turmeric Potato & Truffle Jus); Eliminated: Emily (Icebox Cake with Orange Bourbon Zabaione, Cherries, Hazelnuts & Cocoa Nib Mascarpone)
213	10	"Shrimp Boats and Hat Ladies"	February 2, 2017	1.02
Sudden Death Quickfire Challenge: After going on a shrimping trip with head judge Colicchio, the chefs had to create a dish using their freshly caught shrimp.: Winner: Sheldon (Tomato Water-Poached Roe Shrimp with Smoked Pine, Yuzu, Radish & Sea Beans); Sudden Death Cook-off: Casey, Shirley, and Sylva, who made the judges' least favorite dishes, had to create a dish using the bycatch from their shrimping trip. The loser was immediately eliminated from the competition.; Eliminated: Casey (Charred Squid with Mushroom Soy Broth, Roasted Fennel, Poached Radish & Mirin); Elimination Challenge: The chefs were tasked with making creative and whimsical breakfast and lunch mash-up dishes for a southern brunch. The guest judge for the challenge was pastry chef Dominique Ansel.: Winner: Shirley (Beef & Cheddar Dumpling with Bacon Tomato Jam); Eliminated: Sylva (Arctic Char Frittata with Morel Mushrooms, Beet Sabayon & Pancetta)
214	11	"Adiós Charleston, Hello James Beard"	February 9, 2017	0.88
Quickfire Challenge: The chefs had to cook a dish while simultaneously giving instructions to a mystery partner, hidden behind a partition, on how to cook the same exact dish. The mystery partners were Brooke's sister Jessica. John's wife Tracy, Sheldon's wife Janice, and Shirley's husband, Jimmy. The contestants were judged based on how closely both dishes resembled each other in terms of taste and presentation. The winner received $10,000 and a new sous-vide machine. Chef Michael Solomonov was the guest judge for the challenge.: Winner: Sheldon (6-Minute Egg with Sautéed Mushrooms, Charred Onion & Brown Butter Grapefruit Sauce); Elimination Challenge: The chefs prepared dishes that represented their journeys through Charleston. The winner received the honor of serving their dish and an accompanying menu at the James Beard House in New York City. The guest judges for the challenge included Top Chef Masters alumna Mary Sue Milliken and James Beard Award winners Michael Solomonov, Sean Brock, Ken Oringer, and Renee Erickson.: Winner: Sheldon (Carolina Gold Rice Chow Fun Noodle with Pork Belly, Okra, Annatto Seed & Turkey Broth); Eliminated: Brooke (Braised Pork Shoulder & Tenderloin with Smoked Island Sweets, Radish & Egg Yolk)
215	12	"Cooking Away in Margaritaville"	February 16, 2017	1.04
Quickfire Challenge: The three remaining chefs arrived at the Estadio Chivas in Guadalajara, Mexico for the final rounds of the competition. There, the winner of Last Chance Kitchen, Brooke, was reinstated. The four competitors had to cook dishes featuring goat, the team mascot for C.D. Guadalajara. The winner received $10,000 and an advantage in the Elimination Challenge. The guest judge for the challenge was chef Francisco Ruano.: Winner: Brooke (Goat Ribs with Chamomile, Guajillo & Pasilla Chiles, Mango & Papaya Salad); Elimination Challenge: At the Patrón Hacienda, the chefs created dishes to pair with their own original margaritas using Patrón tequila. The dishes were expected to incorporate the sweet, salty, sour, and bitter notes of a margarita. The chefs were paired up with the four most recently eliminated contestants to assist them with cooking and serving. As the winner of the Quickfire Challenge, Brooke was able to choose her own sous chef and assign her opponents' sous chefs. She chose to work with Casey and picked Emily for Sheldon, Sylva for Shirley, and Katsuji for John. The winner received a limited edition bottle of tequila, Patrón En Lalique, worth approximately $7,500. The guest judge for the challenge was chef Ray Garcia.: Winner: Brooke (Chilled Avocado Soup, Watermelon & Coconut Salad, Spicy Watermelon & Hibiscus Margarita); Eliminated: John (Caldo Verde Con Polo with Patrón Silver Margarita)
216	13	"Trial By Fire"	February 23, 2017	0.97
Quickfire Challenge: After arriving in the Yucatán Peninsula, the chefs were challenged to create a dish featuring habaneros and ingredients from the local market. The winner received a seven-night trip with a guest to any Secrets Resorts & Spas location of their choice. The guest judge for the challenge was chef Ricardo Muñoz Zurita.: Winner: Brooke (Roasted Pork Loin with Orange & Green Habanero Salsas); Elimination Challenge: In honor of traditional Mayan cooking, which laid the foundation for modern Mexican cuisine, the chefs had to create dishes using only ancient Mayan ingredients and tools. While they were allowed to keep their knives, the contestants were unable to use electrical kitchen equipment and were forced to rely on an open flame as a heat source. The guest judges for the challenge were Top Chef México head judge Guillermo González Beristáin and chefs Jeremiah Tower, Roberto Solís, and Carlo Cardenas.: Winner: Shirley (Hoja Santa Leaf-Grilled Grouper with Crustacean Habanero Tomato Sauce & Dragon Fruit Corn Salad); Eliminated: Sheldon (Grilled Snapper with Annatto Crab Sauce, Yucatan Vegetables & Habanero Salsa)
217	14	"Comida Final"	March 2, 2017	1.29
Elimination Challenge: The finalists had to create a four-course progressive meal for a full dining room of guests. Each finalist received help from three sous chefs: two previously eliminated contestants and one chef from their restaurants back home. Brooke was assisted by Sheldon, Sam, and her chef de cuisine Chris, while Shirley was assisted by Casey, Katsuji, and her chef de cuisine Jay. The guest judges for the challenge were Top Chef Masters alum Jonathan Waxman, Food & Wine editor-in-chief Nilou Motamed, and chefs Martha Ortiz, Joachim Splichal, Jonathon Sawyer, and Daniel Boulud.: Brooke: First Course: Warm Oyster with Grilled Swiss Chard & Bacon; Second Course: Charred Octopus with Orange Annatto Seafood Broth, Radish, Garlic Purée & Garlic Chips; Third Course: Braised Pork Belly & Beans with Charred Onion & Purslane; Fourth Course: Aged Rum & Chamomile Flan with Candied Cashews; Shirley: First Course: "Let Me Take You To Lijiang" - Snapper Crudo with Chili Soy Vinegar & Crispy Shallots; Second Course: "When I Was Eight" - Ramen with Egg, Kimchi, Purslane & Rendered Pork Fat; Third Course: "Dear Baba" - Braised Piglet Shank with Lentils, Wild Rice, Blanched Spinach & Habanero Onions; Fourth Course: "Mama Said, Always Finish Your Rice" - Rice Pudding with Tropical Fruit & Lemon-Lime Snow; Winner: Brooke; Runner-up: Shirley

== Last Chance Kitchen ==
No.	Title	Original air date
1	"The Clock"	December 8, 2016
Challenge: The first two eliminated chefs competed in a challenge designed to test their time management skills. The contestants had two minutes to shop for ingredients from the Top Chef pantry. Each section of the pantry was labeled with a specific amount of time; for example, spices were worth +1 minute, while pork and ground beef were worth +4 minutes. Every ingredient the chefs chose would add to their total cook time, and they were required to incorporate these ingredients into their final dish.: Annie: Lamb Tartare with Romanesco & Harissa; Gerald: Shellfish Broth with Turnip & Fennel; Winner: Gerald; Eliminated: Annie
2	"Celery Me on Your Dish"	December 15, 2016
Challenge: The chefs had 30 minutes to create a dish featuring celery.: Gerald: Celery Salad with Alabama BBQ Sauce & Celery Juice Sorbet; Sam: Cream of Celery Soup Topped with Apple & Fried Capers; Winner: Sam; Eliminated: Gerald
3	"Holiday Leftovers"	December 22, 2016
Challenge: The chefs had 20 minutes to create a dish using holiday leftovers.: Sam: Reconstructed Green Bean Casserole, Creamed Spinach, Swiss Chard Vinaigrette & Sweet Potato Crisps; BJ: Deep Fried Turkey Leg with Goat Cheese Mashed Potatoes, Miso Gravy & Fried Egg; Winner: Sam; Eliminated: BJ
4	"With a Little Luck"	December 29, 2016
Challenge: The chefs had 20 minutes to create a dish incorporating at least seven "lucky" ingredients, such as pork, sage, garlic, kale, onions, fish, and black-eyed peas.: Sam: Chicken-Fried Pork Chop, Crunchy Kale, Brown Butter, Sage & Pomegranate Vinaigrette; Silvia: Pan-Seared Branzino with Kale, Red Onion & Light Vinaigrette; Winner: Silvia; Eliminated: Sam
5	"Duck!"	January 5, 2017
Challenge: The chefs had 30 minutes to cook a soulful dish "from the heart" using the ingredients from Amanda's dish that got her eliminated, including duck, red onion, pecans, dandelion greens, sweet potato, and balsamic vinegar.: Silvia: Duck with Spicy Red Onion & Balsamic Purée, Dandelion Greens & Sweet Potato Chips; Amanda: Duck with Sweet Potato & Brown Butter Purée, Dandelion Salad with Sherry Gastrique & Balsamic Duck Jus; Winner: Silvia; Eliminated: Amanda
6	"Raw Deal"	January 12, 2017
Challenge: The chefs had 25 minutes to create a steak and potatoes dish.: Silvia: Grilled New York Ribeye with Roasted Fingerlings, Salsa Verde & Blue Potato Chips; Jim: Seared Porterhouse Steak with Arugula Basil Sauce, Charred Onions & Fingerling Potatoes; Winner: Jim; Eliminated: Silvia
7	"Treasured Ingredients"	January 12, 2017
Challenge: The chefs had 30 minutes to cook a dish using the ingredients assigned to Jamie's team during the pirate-themed Elimination Challenge.: Jim: Butter Poached Lobster in Fennel Ginger Broth with Shiitake Mushrooms & Truffles; Jamie: Butter Poached Lobster & Pea Emulsion with Fennel, Radish & Black Truffle Salad; Winner: Jamie; Eliminated: Jim
8	"Just Five"	January 19, 2017
Challenge: The chefs had 30 minutes to create a dish using five ingredients selected by Jamie; he chose sweet potatoes, onions, shishito peppers, sorghum, and limes.: Jamie: Sorghum Sweet Potatoes, Charred Shishito & Grilled Onion Salad with Shishito Vinaigrette & Lime Sorghum Gastrique; Katsuji: Sautéed Onions and Sweet Potatoes with Sorghum & Charred Shishito Salsa with Lime; Winner: Jamie; Eliminated: Katsuji
9	"No Second Guesses"	January 26, 2017
Challenge: To test their confidence and decision-making, the chefs had only 45 seconds to shop for ingredients. They then had 20 minutes to cook their dish.: Jamie: Watermelon & Heirloom Tomato Salad with Arugula Purée & Fresh Radish; Emily: Heirloom Tomato Salad with Charred Tomato & Corn Vinaigrette with Fresh Corn & Radish; Winner: Jamie; Eliminated: Emily
10	"Snack Attack"	February 2, 2017
Challenge: The chefs had 30 minutes to create an original snack concept. The dishes were required to incorporate at least one variety of Hidden Valley ranch dressing, and the chefs had to serve enough portions to feed the gallery of eliminated contestants. Instead of one winner, two chefs would move on to the next challenge.: Jamie: Pretzel Nachos with Pimento Cheese, Fire-Roasted Pepper & Sriracha Ranch; Casey: Cheese Puff Chicken Tender Lettuce Cups with Aerated Original Ranch; Sylva: Cilantro-Lime Pork Belly on Honey Graham Crackers with Cheese Sauce & Kimchi Strawberry Jam; Winners: Jamie, Casey; Eliminated: Sylva
11	"3-Way, 2 Ways"	February 9, 2017
Challenge: The chefs had 30 minutes to create a dish featuring a protein prepared using two different cooking techniques: braising and sautéing. The contestants with the two best dishes advanced to the final challenge.: Jamie: Braised Scallop over Potato Risotto & Sautéed Scallop over Pickled Tomatoes and Cucumber; Casey: Braised Pork Belly with Fish Sauce & Soy, Sautéed Ground Pork with Cabbage & Swiss Chard; Brooke: Braised Pork Belly & Bacon with Farro, Sautéed Bacon with Cabbage & Asian Flavors; Winners: Casey, Brooke; Eliminated: Jamie
12	"Who Wants to Go to Mexico?"	February 9, 2017
Challenge: To test their consistency, the chefs had 45 minutes to cook two separate dishes. Once finished, the dishes were concealed under cloches. Colicchio then randomly selected one dish from each contestant for judging.: Brooke: Cauliflower Soup with Garnish of Olive, Dill, Pepper & Preserved Lemon; ~~Ground Pork Larb with Apple & Fennel Salad~~; Casey: Steamed Cod with Lettuce Cream, Aromatics of Onion, Ginger & Garlic, Crispy Cauliflower; ~~Seared Strip Steak with Spicy Rub, Crispy Potatoes, Collard Greens, Chorizo & Pickled Peach~~; Winner: Brooke; Eliminated: Casey
