= Gabriel Pascuzzi =

American chef

- Born: Portland, Oregon, U.S.
- Education: Johnson & Wales University

Gabriel Pascuzzi is an American chef. He competed on the Food Network's Beat Bobby Flay and Bravo's Top Chef: Portland, and his restaurants in Portland, Oregon include Stacked Sandwich Shop and Mama Bird. Pascuzzi was Eater Portland's Chef of the Year in 2017.

== Early life and education ==
Gabriel Pascuzzi was born and raised in an Italian American family in Portland, Oregon. He graduated from Wilson High School (now Ida B. Wells-Barnett High School). He earned his Bachelor's degree in culinary arts from Johnson & Wales University.

== Career ==
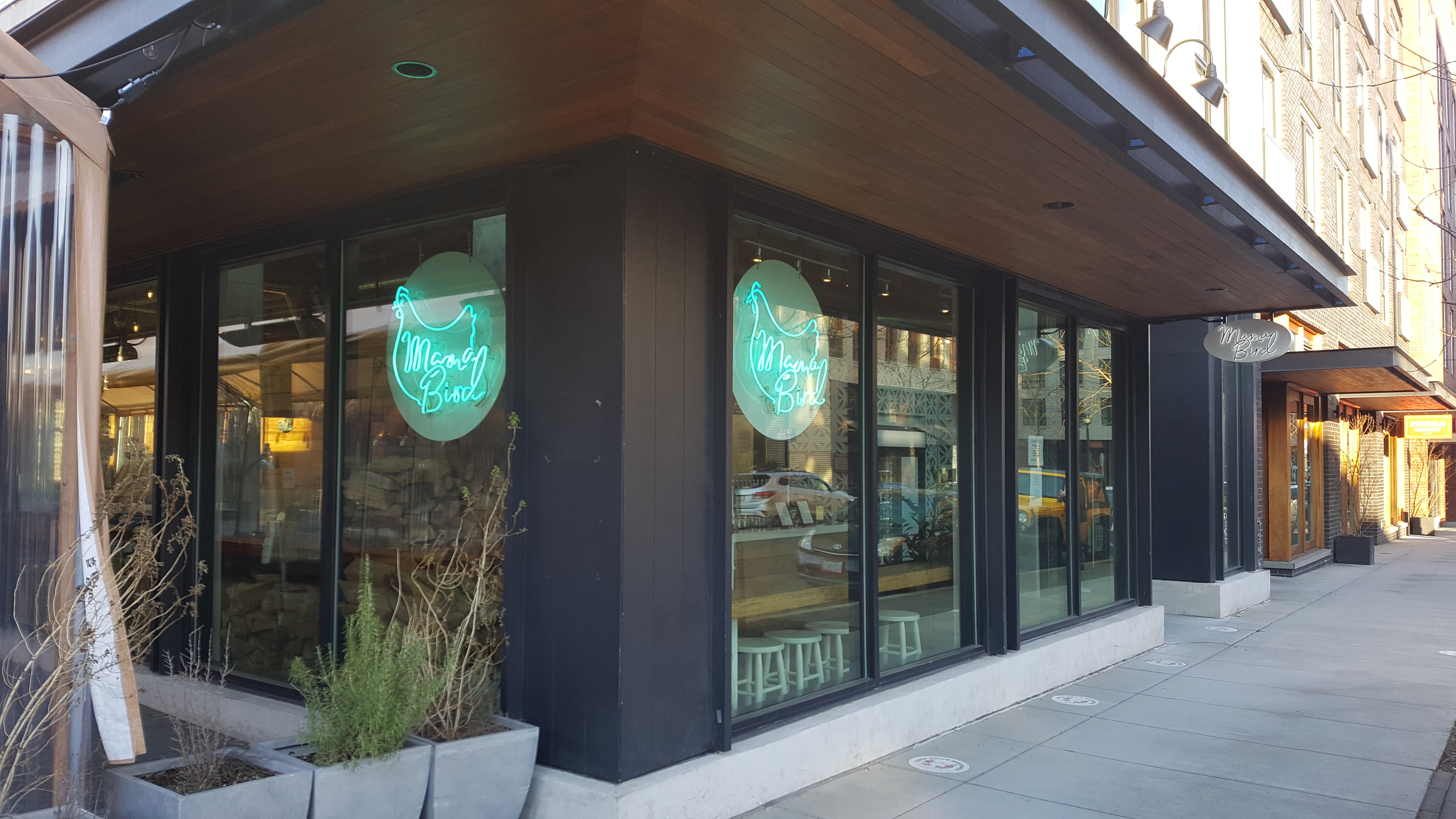
Mama Bird, 2022

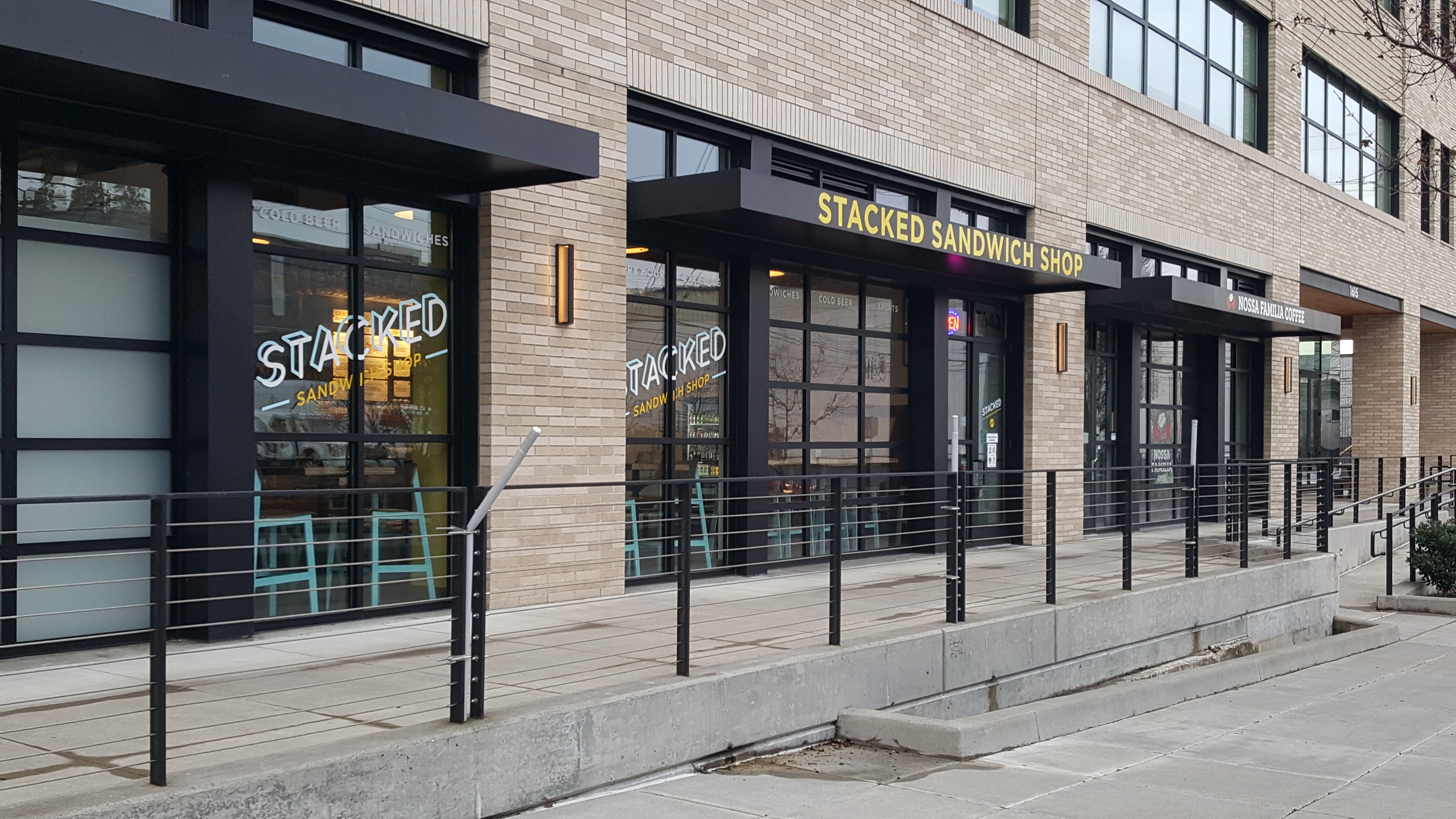
Stacked Sandwich Shop, 2021

Pascuzzi's background is in fine dining and Thrillist has described Pascuzzi as a "fine-dining vet". Pascuzzi has worked at Copenhagen's Noma, as well as DB Bistro Moderne, Colicchio & Sons, and Paulée. He was the head chef at Multnomah Whiskey Library, as of 2014–2015. Pascuzzi has competed on the Food Network's Beat Bobby Flay and Bravo's Top Chef: Portland.

Pascuzzi's restaurants in Portland have included Stacked Sandwich Shop, Mama Bird, and Feel Good. Mama Bird was replaced by Bistecca in 2025.

Eater Portland named Pascuzzi the Chef of the Year in 2017, as part of its annual Eater Awards.

== See also ==
- List of people from Portland, Oregon
- List of Top Chef contestants
