= MWL =

MWL may refer to:

- Maine Women's Lobby, an organization advocating on behalf of women and girls in Maine
- The Maxwell Show, a radio show airing weekday mornings on WNCX in Cleveland, Ohio
- Mineral Wells Airport, a public-use airfield in Texas (FAA & IATA identification code)
- Miniature Warning Light crossing, a type of level crossing
- Mirandese language, a Romance language spoken in a small area of northeastern Portugal
- Morwell railway station, Australia
- Multnomah Whiskey Library, a bar and restaurant in Portland, Oregon, U.S.
- Muslim World League, a Pan-Islamic non-governmental organization that propagates Islamic teachings
