= Pike Motorworks =

Building in Seattle, Washington, U.S.

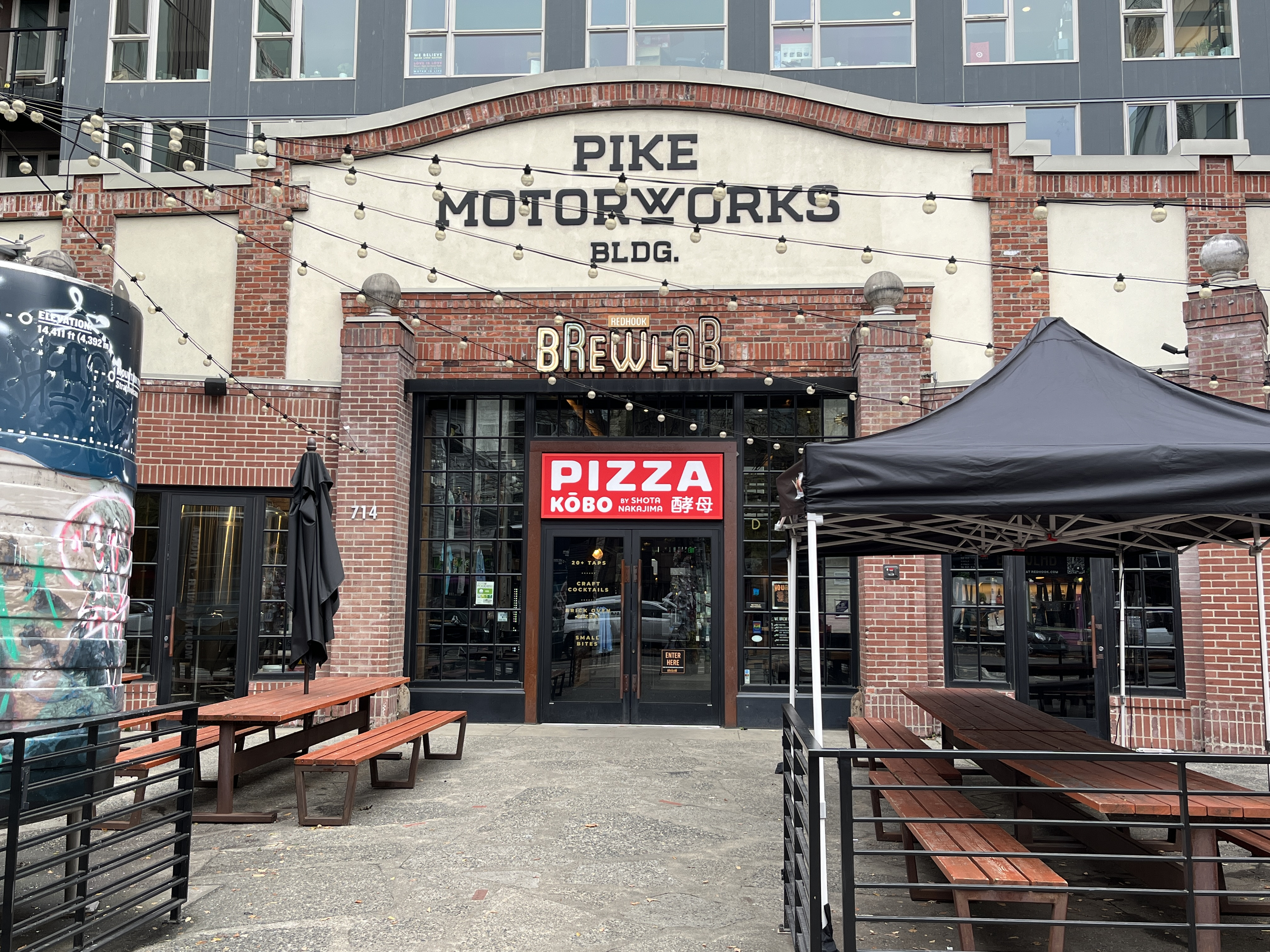
- Exterior, 2023
- Interactive map of the Pike Motorworks area

General information
- Location: Seattle, Washington, United States
- Coordinates: 47°36′52″N 122°19′22″W

Pike Motorworks is a mixed-use development on Seattle's Capitol Hill, in the U.S. state of Washington. Exxel Pacific built the complex, which is located at 714 E. Pike Street and has a historic storefront.

== Description ==
The two-building, 323,750-square-foot mixed-use development has 260 apartments, and houses several businesses, including Pinoyshki Bakery & Cafe and a brewpub operated by Redhook Ale Brewery. Redhook Brewlab's kitchen also hosted Shota Nakajima's now-defunct restaurant Kōbo Pizza, which offered "Japanese-inspired" Detroit-style pizza.

== History ==
The site, which formerly housed a BMW car dealership, was acquired for approximately $14.9 million in 2012. Pike Motorworks sold for approximately $128.3 million in 2019.

In late 2015, Redhook announced plans to open a brewpub in the building in 2016. The Brewlab opened in 2017. Verve Bowls opened in Pike Motorworks in 2016. Salt & Straw had announced plans to open a shop in the complex in 2017.

A 615-square-foot apartment was available for $2,434 in 2017.
