= Kōbo Pizza =

Defunct pizzeria in Seattle, Washington, U.S.

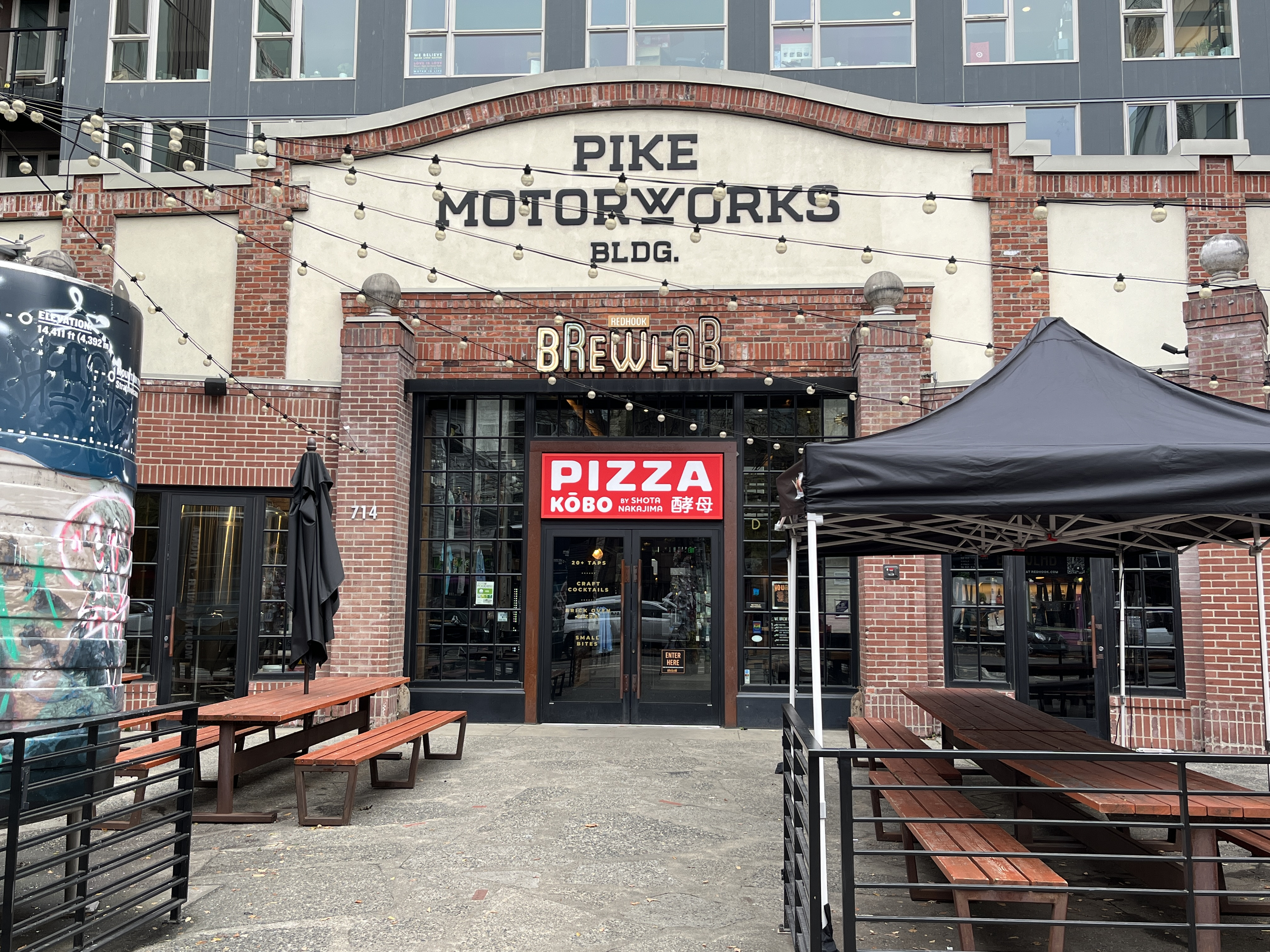
- Exterior of the Pike Motorworks building with signage for Redhook Brewlab and Kōbo Pizza in 2023
- Interactive map of Kōbo Pizza

Restaurant information
- Established: September 10, 2022
- Closed: October 31, 2024
- Owner: Shota Nakajima
- Location: 714 East Pike Street, Seattle, King, Washington, 98122, United States
- Coordinates: 47.6143°N 122.3227°W

Kōbo Pizza was a pizzeria in Seattle, in the U.S. state of Washington. Owner Shota Nakajima opened the restaurant in the Pike Motorworks building on Capitol Hill in September 2022. It closed permanently in October 2024.

== Description ==
Kōbo Pizza operated at Redhook Brewlab, in the Pike Motorworks building on East Pike Street on Seattle's Capitol Hill, serving square-shaped Detroit-style pizza. "Kōbo" means "yeast" in Japanese. Pizza dough was made with milk, buttermilk, and clarified butter to resemble Japanese milk bread.

Pizza varieties included The Flat-Earther, a variant of the Pizza Margherita with mozzarella and basil on a red sauce, and The Hot Neighbor, which had fried chicken from the neighboring restaurant Taku, as well as Monterey Jack, cilantro, and koji hot sauce. The Dodger, which was named after the owner's dog, had teriyaki brisket, cheddar cheese, tonkatsu, and Kewpie mayonnaise. The Ginny had pepperoni, cheese, and garlic honey. Some pizzas, including The Dodger, also had shredded cabbage.

In addition to pizzas, the restaurant served small corn dogs, tater tots with chili jam ketchup, small pretzels with miso beer cheese, and deep-fried broccoli with chili sauce. The Hill-D Cheese was a grilled cheese on sourdough, served with a blend of four cheeses and a bowl of tomato soup. The Hot Leg was a chicken leg with koji hot sauce, seaweed ranch, and pickled celery.

== History ==
Shota Nakajima opened Kōbo Pizza on September 10, 2022, next to his restaurant Taku. Kōbo was his second restaurant in the city. It replaced the food menu previously served by Redhook Brewlab.

As a New Year's Eve special, the restaurant served East Coast–inspired pizzas from December 28 to 31. On New Year's Day in 2023, Kōbo served brunch with banana and miso cinnamon rolls, Japanese pancakes with coconut-infused maple syrup, and pork katsu with eggs and kimchi hollandaise sauce. The brunch also included cocktails made by Redhook Brewlab.

In October 2024, Nakajima announced plans to close Kōbo permanently on October 31. He wrote in a closing announcement, "We got to make some seriously dope pizza and connect with all of you in the community. A huge thank you to each and every one of you who stopped by, supported us, and shared in the love of good food." Bethany Jean Clement, a food writer for The Seattle Times, said Nakajima "retroactively [branded]" the business as a pop-up in the announcement. The restaurant's final special pizza was the Wandering Forager.

== Reception ==
Hayley Hamilton Cogill included Kōbo in Tasting Table's 2023 list of the 20 best restaurants from Top Chef contestants.

== See also ==
- List of defunct restaurants of the United States
