= Byron Gomez =

Costa Rican chef

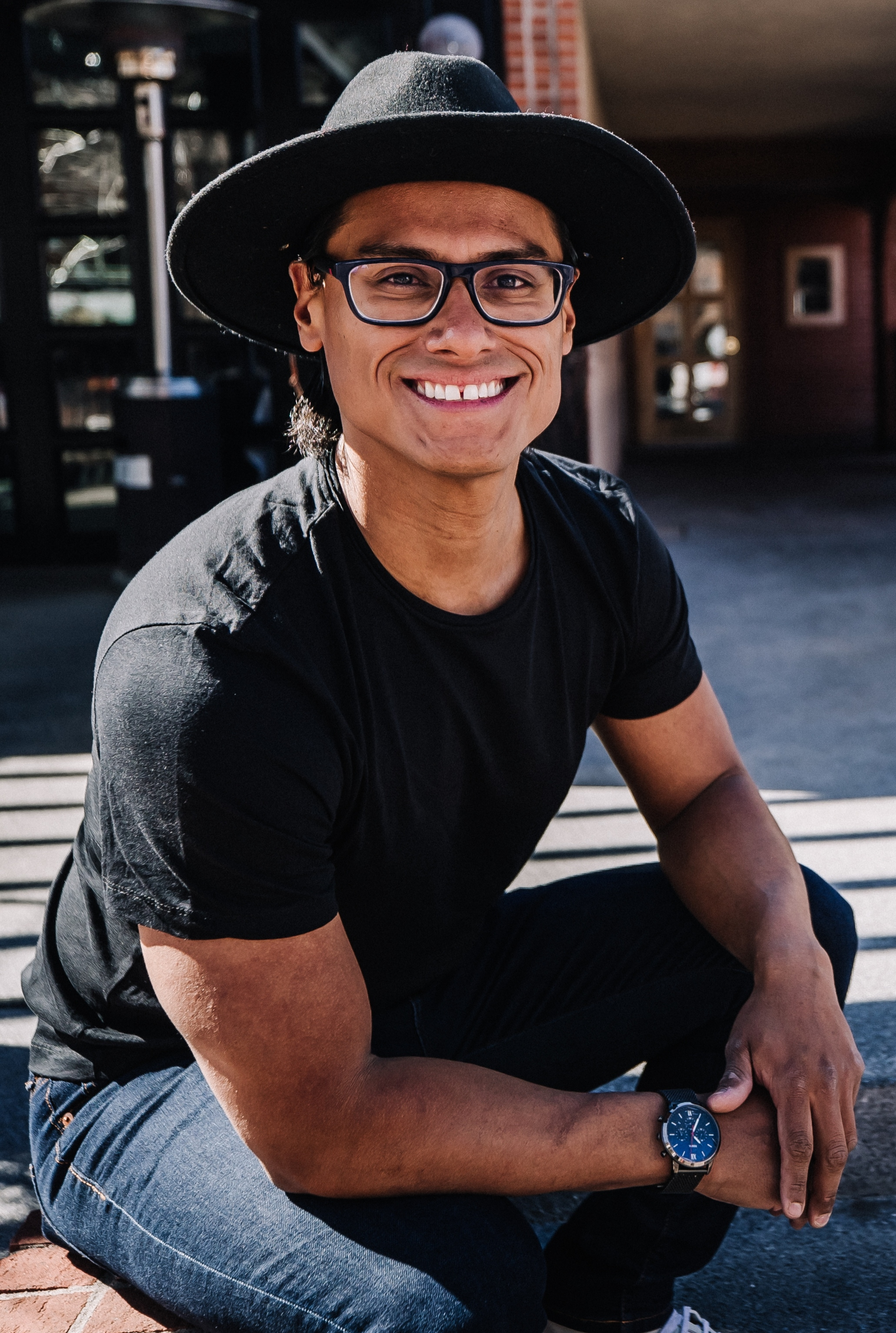
- Born: Byron Jose Gomez Chacon; June 6, 1988 (age 38); Heredia, Costa Rica
- Education: Eastern Suffolk Boces Oakdale Campus, Oakdale NY.
- Occupation: Chef
- Years active: 2004-present
- Television: Top Chef (season 18)
- Website: chefbyrongomez.com

Byron Gomez (born June 6, 1988) is a Costa Rican celebrity chef based in Denver, Colorado. He competed on season 18 of Bravo's Top Chef: Portland.

== Early life ==
Byron was born in Costa Rica, he migrated to the United States when he was 8 years old. Byron is a DACA recipient (Deferred Action for Childhood Arrivals program). His interest in culinary arts started at a young age and after several years cooking on Long Island, he set his sights on New York City. He honed his skills under culinary luminaries like Daniel Boulud, Ronny Emborg, Gavin Kaysen, and Daniel Humm.

== Career ==
While working at Eleven Madison Park, named the World’s Best Restaurant in 2017, Byron traveled with the restaurant’s pop up experiences to the Hamptons and Aspen. After spending the winter in the Rocky Mountains resort town, he decided to plant roots and became the executive chef at 7908 Aspen in 2019. Byron was featured on Season 18 of Bravo’s Top Chef.

== See also ==
- Bobby's Triple Threat
