= Pinoyshki Bakery & Cafe =

Restaurant in Seattle, Washington, U.S.

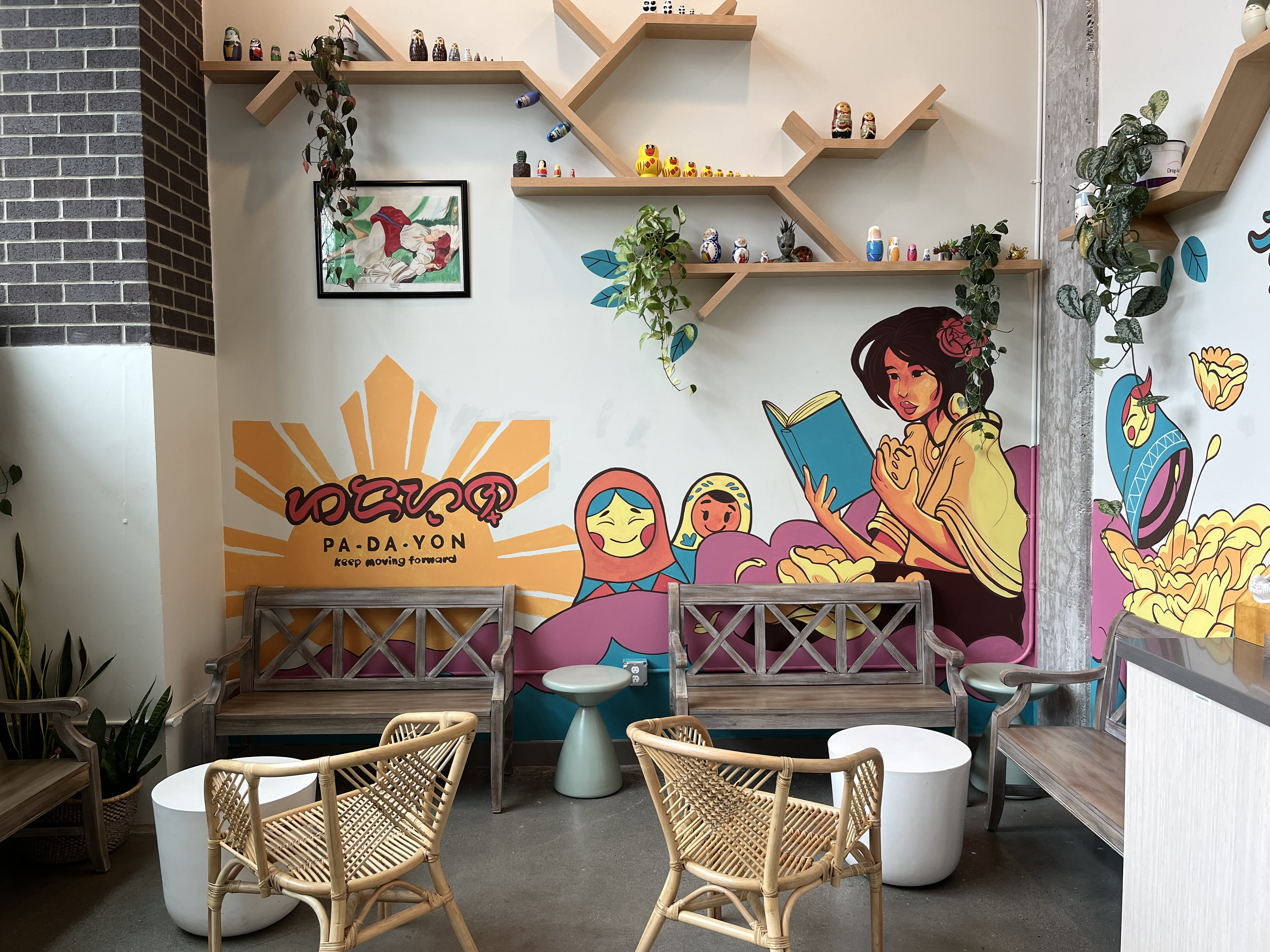
- The bakery's interior, 2024
- Interactive map of Pinoyshki Bakery & Cafe

Restaurant information
- Established: 1994
- Owner: Aly Anderson
- Location: 715 East Pine Street, Seattle, King, Washington, 98122, United States
- Coordinates: 47.6151°N 122.3226°W

Pinoyshki Bakery & Cafe, or simply Pinoyshki, is a restaurant in Seattle, in the U.S. state of Washington. Established in 1994, the bakery previously operated on 3rd Avenue and was known as Piroshki on 3rd (or Piroshki on Third), before rebranding in December 2023 and relocating to Capitol Hill in early 2024. Owned by Aly Anderson since 2016, the bakery has been featured on the Food Network's Diners, Drive-Ins and Dives.

== Description ==
Pinoyshki operates on the Pine Street side of the Pike Motorworks development, between Harvard and Boylston Avenues on Seattle's Capitol Hill. In 2014, Eater Seattle said the bakery specializes in "mashups of Filipino empanadas and Russian piroshki". Originally focusing on Eastern European and Russian piroshki, the menu was later expanded to incorporate Filipino cuisine. Piroshki varieties have included the cornpilog (corned beef hash), atsara (pickled papaya), and asadero (beef). The restaurant has also served borscht, a cheese and kimchi croissant, and chocnut babka. A small dessert called the "pot of gold" has chocolate sponge cake with espresso mousse and Irish cream custard.

== History ==
Piroshki on 3rd was established in 1994. Since 2016, the bakery has been owned by Aly Anderson, who expanded the restaurant's menu to reflect her Filipino heritage. Guy Fieri visited to film for the 28th season of the Food Network's Diners, Drive-Ins and Dives (episode "Tasty Traditions"), which aired in 2018. Like many restaurants, Piroshki on 3rd operated via delivery and take-out at times during the COVID-19 pandemic. The bakery rebranded in December 2023 and relocated from downtown Seattle to Capitol Hill in 2024.

== Reception ==
In 2019, Hoodline included Piroshki on 3rd in a list of the city's four best Russian eateries, describing it as "the highest rated Russian restaurant in Seattle, boasting 4.5 stars out of 303 reviews on Yelp". The website also included Piroshki on 3rd in 2019 lists of five "favorite spots to find affordable Eastern European food" and five "favorite bakeries (that won't break the bank)", as well as a 2020 overview of four Seattle eateries for inexpensive desserts. Naomi Tomky included Piroshki on 3rd in the Seattle Post-Intelligencer's 2021 overview of the metropolitan area's best "hidden gem" bakeries. Eater Seattle writers included Pinoyshki in a 2024 list of 19 "essential" Capitol Hill restaurants and a 2025 overview of the best restaurants in the neighborhood.

== See also ==
- List of bakeries
- List of Diners, Drive-Ins and Dives episodes
- List of Filipino restaurants
- List of Russian restaurants
