= Willamette Valley Vineyards =

American winery based in Turner, Oregon

Coordinates: 44.8250°N 123.0071°W

Willamette Valley Vineyards, Inc.
- Type: Winery / Public
- Traded as: Nasdaq: WVVI
- Industry: Wine
- Founded: 1983
- Founder: Jim Bernau and Don Voorhies
- Headquarters: Turner, Oregon, U.S.
- Website: www.wvv.com

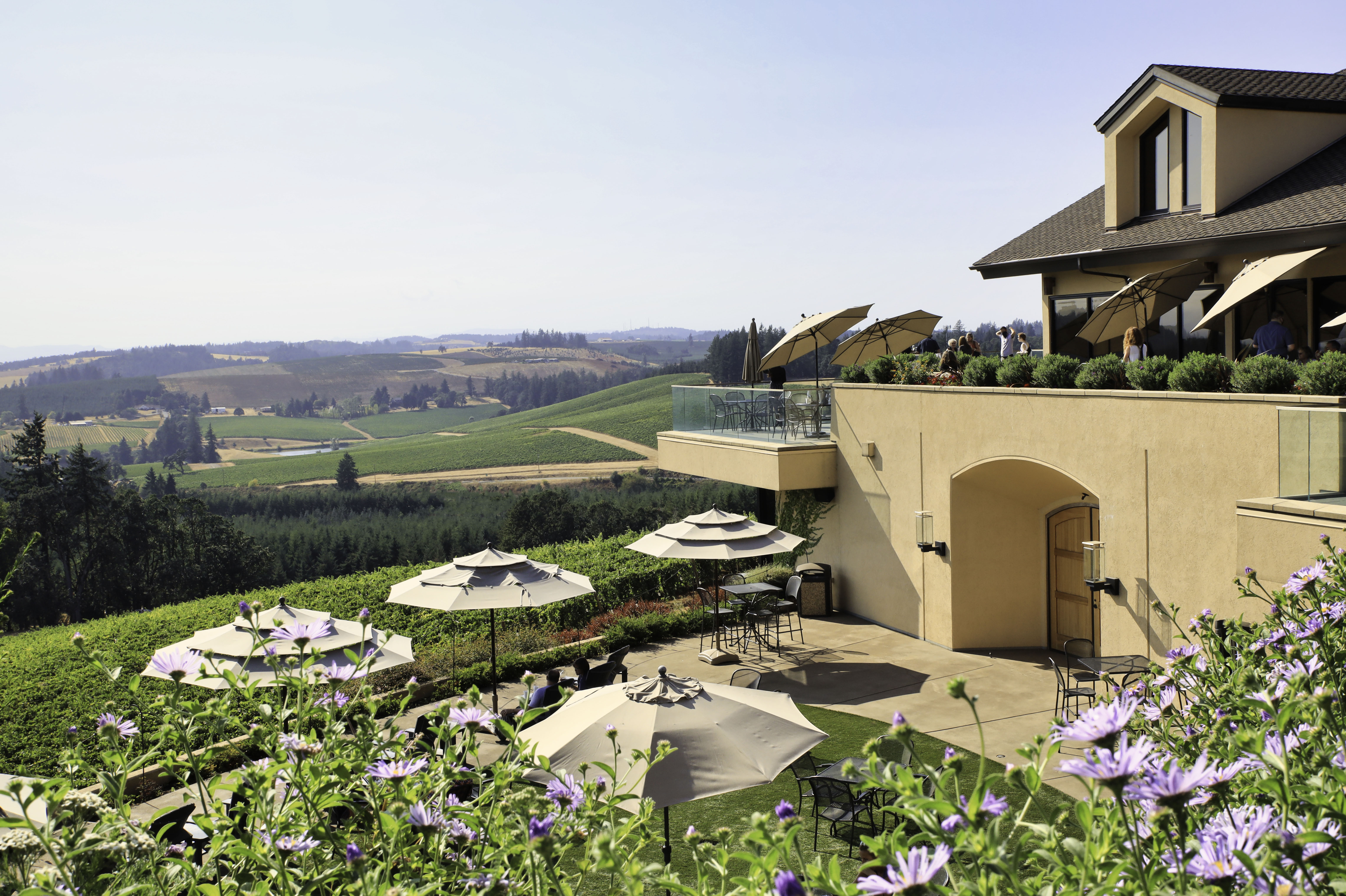
Willamette Valley Vineyards Estate patio and courtyard in the Salem Hills

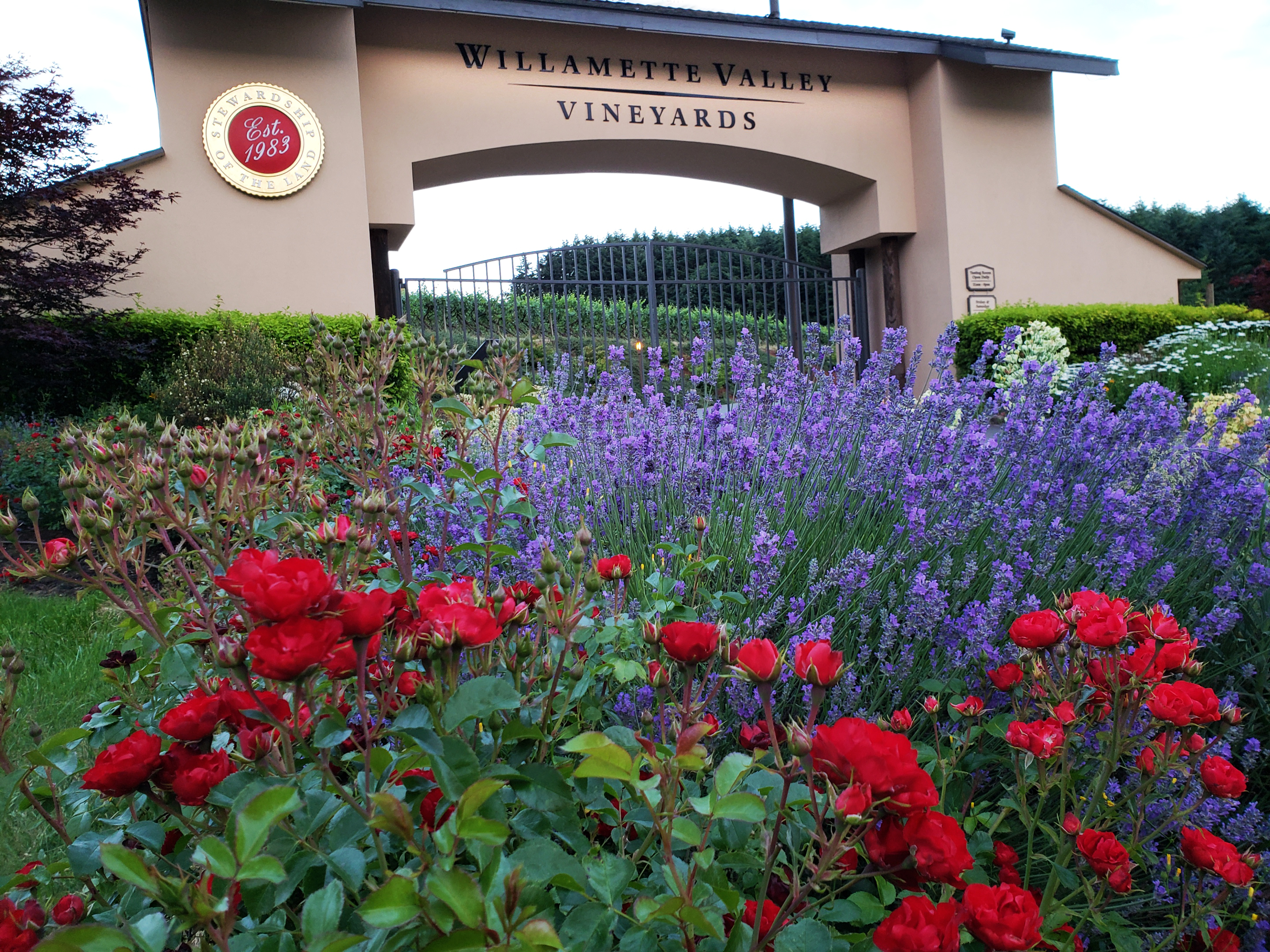
Entrance of the Willamette Valley Vineyards Estate in Turner, Oregon.

Willamette Valley Vineyards is an American winery located in Turner, Oregon. Named after Oregon's Willamette Valley, the winery is the leading producer of Willamette Valley-appellated Pinot Noir in Oregon, and also produces Chardonnay and Pinot Gris. In 2016, the winery was the largest producer of Riesling wine in the Willamette Valley.

== History ==
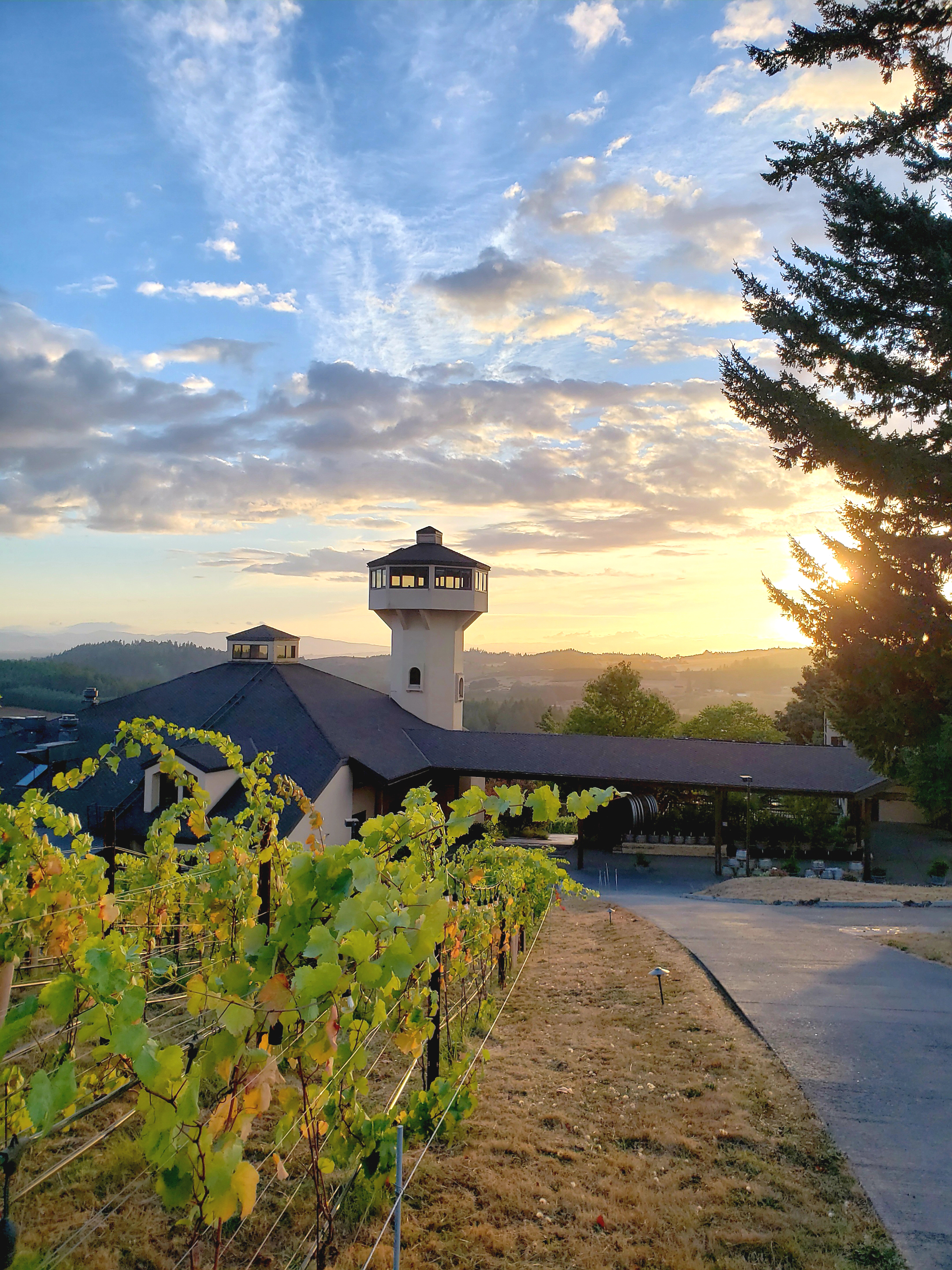
View of the Willamette Valley Vineyards Estate tasting room at sunset.

Willamette Valley Vineyards was founded by Jim Bernau and Don Voorhies. In 1997, Willamette Valley Vineyards merged with Tualatin Estate Vineyards, which was established by Bill Fuller in 1973.

The winery was established via an early crowdfunding campaign. In 1989, around 1,200 shareholders invested an average of $1,700 each in an unlisted stock offering approved by Oregon regulators. By 1993, the number of shareholders had grown to 4,500 and many shareholders were directly involved with operations, collectively donating 6,000 to 7,000 hours of labor per month. Over 300 shareholders passed an OLCC class to be certified to pour wine in the tasting room. The winery is now listed on the NASDAQ under the symbol WVVI.

In 2021, the winery hosted the season 18 finale of Bravo's Top Chef: Portland.

== Subsidiaries ==
In 2015, founder Jim Bernau and winery director Christine Clair founded the Oregon Estate Vineyards division to manage subsidiary vineyards.

Since 2007, Willamette Valley Vineyards has managed Elton Vineyards in the Eola-Amity Hills AVA. Elton Vineyards is primarily planted with Pinot Noir and Chardonnay. In 2017, Willamette Valley Vineyards began selling a boutique wine label under the "Elton" name.

In 2015, the company purchased new vineyard sites in the Walla Walla Valley AVA for a new subsidiary, "Pambrun Vineyard", named after Bernau's ancestor, Pierre Pambrun, a Walla Walla pioneer. Pambrun produces Cabernet Sauvignon along with other Bordeaux varieties. In 2018, Willamette Valley Vineyards acquired nearby Maison Bleue Winery, previously owned by Jon Meuret, who was also the consulting winemaker for Pambrun Vineyard.

== Press coverage ==
In 2015, Wine Enthusiast named Willamette Valley Vineyards' Whole Cluster Pinot Noir as one of "America's Best Value Pinot Noirs".

The Wall Street Journal included Willamette Valley Vineyards' Pinot Gris in the article, "Why Wine Remains a Great Connector".
