= Sunshine Noodles =

Restaurant in Portland, Oregon, U.S.

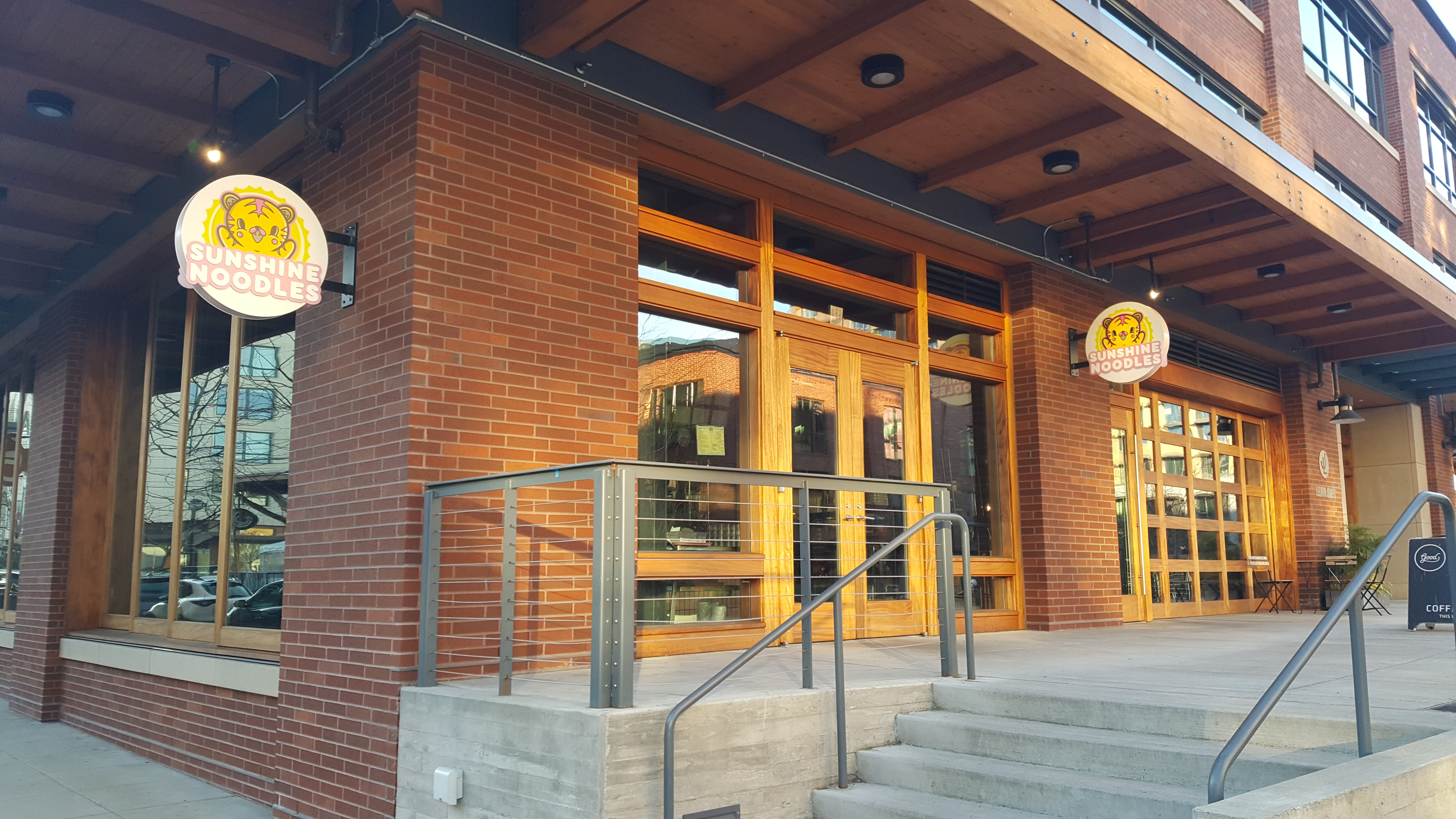
- The restaurant's exterior in 2022
- Interactive map of Sunshine Noodles

Restaurant information
- Established: 2019
- Closed: December 2022
- Food type: Cambodian American
- Location: 2175 Northwest Raleigh Street, Suite 105, Portland, Multnomah, Oregon, 97210, United States
- Coordinates: 45.5342°N 122.6960°W
- Website: sunshinenoodlespdx.com

Sunshine Noodles was a Cambodian American restaurant in Portland, Oregon, United States. Owner Diane Lam operated the business from 2019 to 2022, initially as a pop-up noodle bar and later as a brick-and-mortar restaurant in the Slabtown area of Northwest Portland's Northwest District. Despite garnering a positive reception, Lam closed Sunshine Noodles permanently in late 2022 and relocated to San Francisco.

== Description ==
Sunshine Noodles was a Cambodian American restaurant in Slabtown in Northwest Portland's Northwest District. Brooke Jackson-Glidden of Eater Portland described the interior, which had neon lights and pink tiles, as "Hello Kitty-meets-Blade Runner".

The frequently changed menu included Phnom Penh noodles, a beef brisket noodle stew, fish sauce spaghetti and meatballs, and catfish spring rolls. The brunch menu included macaroni soup, steak with eggs and rice, strawberry French toast, and grits with shrimp and bacon jam. Cocktails included the Mekhong Vacation, a passion fruit margarita.

== History ==
Revelry chef Diane Lam launched Sunshine Noodles in 2019 as a pop-up noodle bar with David Sigal. The menu included kuyteav Phnom Penh and num banhchok. The pop-up was successful, according to Jackson-Glidden of Eater Portland. Revelry planned to rebrand the outlet as Revelry Noodle Bar but closed in 2020 during the COVID-19 pandemic.

Sunshine Noodles operated at North Portland's Psychic Bar from July 2020 to January 2021. The Cambodian menu included spelt noodles with French-style vegan tomato and maitake mushroom ragout with Maggi seasoning, as well as samlor machu and grilled corn with a coconut milk glaze. Sunshine Noodles also served potato-chip salad with cabbage, wasabi ranch dressing, candied cashews, and chile relleno banh chao. The pop-up was designed for social distancing during the pandemic.

Lam began hosting a series of dinner parties called Penh Pals at the restaurant. The pop-up operation was expanded and extended through March 2021. According to Jackson-Glidden, Sunshine Noodle's fried chicken with lime sauce became "a breakout hit". The pop-up was originally scheduled to operate longer but temporarily ended service on December 24, 2020, intending to reopen at a permanent location in March 2021. The pop-up hosted a Valentine's Day dinner. In November 2021, Sunshine Noodles announced plans to re-open as a brick-and-mortar restaurant in Slabtown on December 13 the same year. The restaurant launched a brunch menu in 2022.

In December 2022, Lam announced plans to permanently close Sunshine Noodles on December 18 and relocate to San Francisco. Stacked Sandwich Shop is scheduled to reopen in the space in 2023 alongside a second location of Feel Good.

== Reception ==
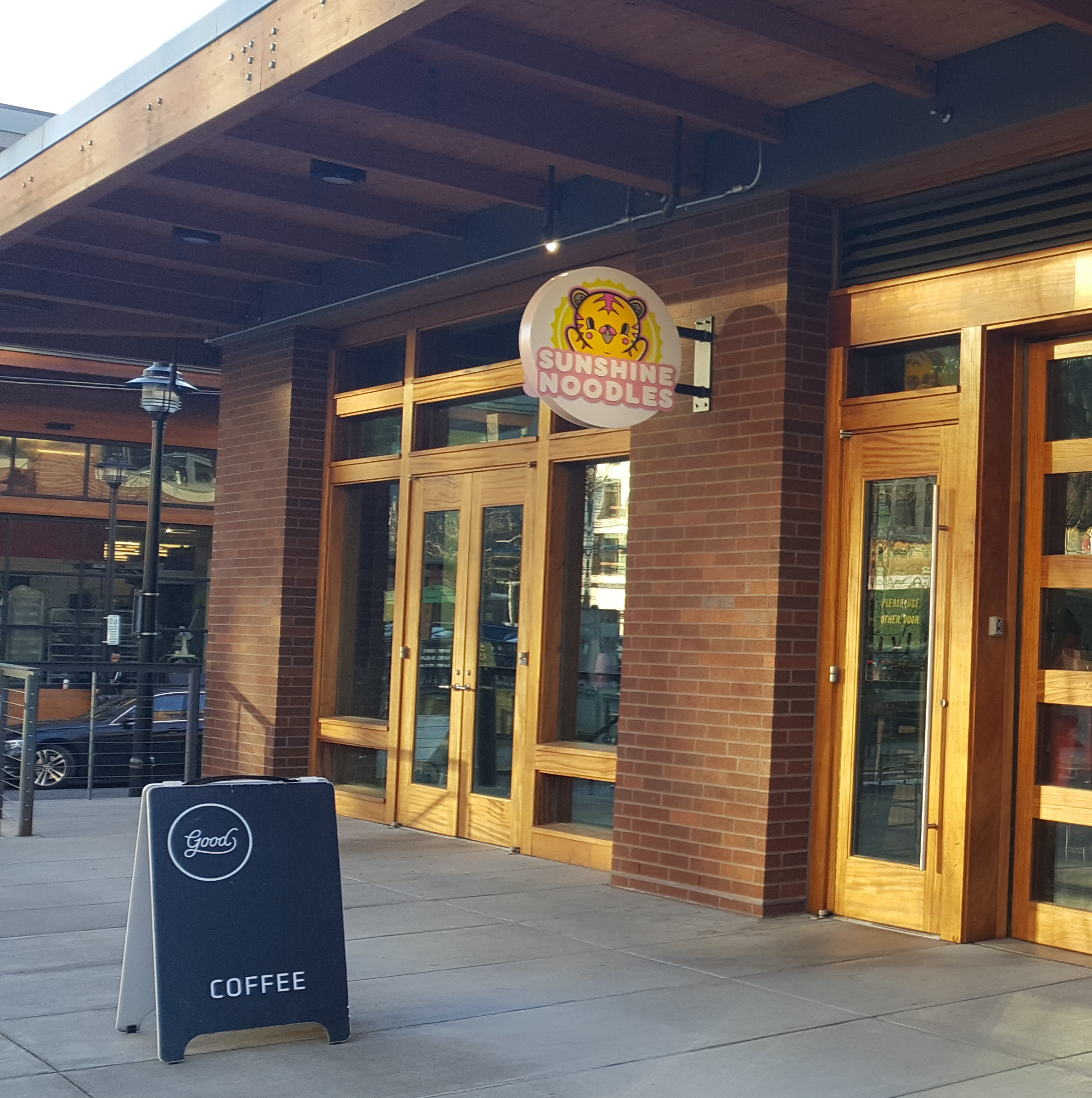
The restaurant's exterior, 2022

In August 2020, Willamette Week called the pop-up at Psychic Bar "an avowedly irreverent, none too serious take on contemporary Cambodian food" and said: "The corn pudding is a candidate for the city's best new dessert, but the lime pepper wings are the breakout hit—spicy and complex, they want for nothing except a beer, and perhaps a napkin." The newspaper also included Sunshine Noodles in a list of five "great" new restaurants that began operating in 2020.

Katherine Chew Hamilton of Portland Monthly also included Sunshine Noodles in an overview of the best new restaurants of 2020. For the magazine's 2020 "Portland Food Highlight Reel", she wrote: "We also loved the patio at contemporary Cambodian spot Sunshine Noodles, one of the first restaurants in Portland that was specifically designed with pandemic safety considerations in mind, with Dance Dance Revolution-themed arrows directing foot traffic and cartoon noodle bowls serving as social distance markers." In 2022, Hamilton included the fish sauce spaghetti and meatballs in a list of four noodle dishes "to eat now", and the Le Quick Fix in the magazine's list of the "best local spots to sip espresso martinis like a '90s boss".

Michael Russell included Sunshine Noodles in The Oregonian's list of Portland's 25 best new restaurants of 2022.
