= Top Chef: Portland =

Season 18 of American television series

- Season 18
- Hosted by: Padma Lakshmi
- Judges: Main Tom Colicchio Gail Simmons; Rotating Carrie Baird Richard Blais Nina Compton Tiffany Derry Gregory Gourdet Melissa King Kristen Kish Edward Lee Kwame Onwuachi Amar Santana Dale Talde Brooke Williamson
- No. of contestants: 15
- Winner: Gabe Erales
- Runners-up: Shota Nakajima; Dawn Burrell
- Location: Portland, Oregon
- Finals venue: Oregon Coast
- Fan Favorite: Shota Nakajima
- No. of episodes: 14

Release
- Original network: Bravo
- Original release: April 1 – July 1, 2021

Season chronology
- ← Previous; All-Stars L.A. Next → Houston

Top Chef: Portland is the eighteenth season of the American reality television series Top Chef. It was first announced by Bravo on September 28, 2020. The season was filmed in Portland, Oregon, and surrounding areas, including the Hood River Fruit Loop, Columbia River Gorge, Mount Hood, Tillamook Bay, Tualatin Valley, and Willamette Valley wine country. The winner received US$250,000.

Numerous production changes were made in response to COVID-19, and the pandemic's impact on the food industry became a recurring theme for challenges and discussions throughout the season. Due to the difficulty of bringing in guest judges and diners for individual episodes while observing pandemic safety protocols, in addition to series mainstays Tom Colicchio, Gail Simmons, and Padma Lakshmi, the season features a rotating judging and dining panel consisting of various Top Chef alumni.

Top Chef: Portland premiered on April 1, 2021, and concluded on July 1, 2021. In the season finale, Gabe Erales was declared the winner over runners-up Shota Nakajima and Dawn Burrell. Nakajima was voted Fan Favorite.

== Production ==
Production ran from early September through late October 2020. In response to COVID-19, a comprehensive health and safety plan was developed by Bravo and Magical Elves Productions in accordance with CDC guidelines, state and local orders, and safety policies from NBCUniversal. According to Magical Elves Productions co-CEO Casey Kriley, the company spent six months planning how to film during the pandemic. The cast and production crew, totaling around 150 people, were kept isolated in a bubble, similar to those used for sporting events, at the Kimpton Hotel Monaco Portland. They were tested for the coronavirus every other day. Due to the size of the production crew, the departments were broken up into separate zones that worked at different times.

Sanitation protocols were changed. The judges were not allowed to share plates of food; tasting spoons had to be discarded after every taste; and contestants were each given their own individual spice containers, instead of sharing them. Other production changes included curbside pickup and delivery from Whole Foods Market instead of in-store shopping; the exclusion of challenges involving large dinners, tasting events, and crowds; as well as a bigger kitchen set and judges' table to allow for more social distancing. According to Colicchio and Simmons, nobody became ill during filming.

The producers were committed to their decision to go with Portland, Oregon, as a host for Top Chef, despite ongoing civil unrest in the city including protests over the police murder of George Floyd and killing of Breonna Taylor. While the show was able to avoid the protests, which were largely concentrated to downtown Portland, the producers did not anticipate the effects of the 2020 Oregon wildfires, which "[threw] a massive curveball" into the production schedule. At times, the producers were unable to shoot outdoors, or even indoors, due to the smoke caused by the wildfires, forcing them to shift the schedule and filming locations around.

== Contestants ==
Fifteen chefs competed in Top Chef: Portland. The cast consisted entirely of executive chefs and restaurant owners, making it the first season of Top Chef to not include any sous-chefs among the competitors.

Name	Hometown	Current Residence (Note: The contestants' city and state of residence during time of filming.)
Brittanny Anderson	Richmond, Virginia	
Avishar Barua	Columbus, Ohio	
Dawn Burrell	Philadelphia, Pennsylvania	Houston, Texas
Gabe Erales	El Paso, Texas	Austin, Texas
Nelson German	New York City, New York	Oakland, California
Byron Gomez	Central Islip, New York	Aspen, Colorado
Sasha Grumman	Newport Beach, California	Houston, Texas
Roscoe Hall	Chicago, Illinois	Birmingham, Alabama
Sara Hauman	Vista, California	Portland, Oregon
Kiki Louya	Detroit, Michigan	
Maria Mazon	Tucson, Arizona/Navojoa, Sonora, Mexico	Tucson, Arizona
Shota Nakajima	Tokyo, Japan/Seattle, Washington	Seattle, Washington
Gabriel Pascuzzi	Portland, Oregon	
Jamie Tran	Stockton, California	Las Vegas, Nevada
Chris Viaud	Randolph, Massachusetts	Milford, New Hampshire

Dawn Burrell returned to compete in Top Chef: World All-Stars.

== Contestant progress ==
Episode #		1	2	3	4	5	6	7	8	9	10	11	12	13	14
Quickfire Challenge Winner(s)		Kiki; Sara; Sasha	Jamie	Avishar	Chris	Chris	Gabriel^{1}	Shota	N/A	Dawn^{1}	Dawn^{1}	Dawn^{1}	Jamie^{1}	Gabe^{1}	N/A
Contestant		Elimination Challenge Results													
1	Gabe	HIGH	HIGH	IN	WIN	IN	HIGH	IN	LOW	WIN	IN^{3}	WIN	LOW	IN^{4}	WINNER
2	Shota	HIGH	WIN	HIGH	IN	LOW	WIN	IN	HIGH	HIGH	IN^{3}	HIGH	WIN	WIN^{4}	RUNNER-UP
2	Dawn	IN	HIGH	WIN	IN	HIGH	HIGH	HIGH	LOW	HIGH	IN^{3}	HIGH	LOW	IN^{4}	RUNNER-UP
4	Jamie	LOW	IN	HIGH	IN	OUT		WIN^{2}	HIGH	LOW	IN^{3}	LOW	OUT		
5	Maria	IN	IN	IN	IN	HIGH	LOW	LOW	WIN	HIGH	IN^{3}	OUT			
6	Byron	IN	LOW	IN	IN	WIN	LOW	IN	HIGH	LOW	OUT^{3}				
7	Chris	IN	LOW	LOW	HIGH	IN	LOW	LOW	LOW	OUT					
8	Sara	WIN	HIGH	IN	IN	IN	WIN	HIGH	OUT						
9	Avishar	LOW	WIN	IN	LOW	HIGH	LOW	OUT							
10	Gabriel	HIGH	HIGH	IN	HIGH	LOW	OUT								
10	Nelson	IN	IN	IN	LOW	IN	OUT								
12	Kiki	IN	IN	LOW	OUT										
13	Brittanny	IN	LOW	OUT											
14	Sasha	LOW	OUT												
15	Roscoe	OUT													

^Note 1: The chef(s) did not receive immunity for winning the Quickfire Challenge.
^Note 2: Following Episode 5 of Last Chance Kitchen, Jamie returned to the competition.
^Note 3: Due to the tournament-style format of the Elimination Challenge in Episode 10, no top or bottom dishes were determined. The winner of each round was declared safe, while the loser of the final round was eliminated.
^Note 4: Since the judges could not decide on a losing dish, all three chefs moved forward to the finale.

(WINNER) The chef won the season and was crowned "Top Chef".
(RUNNER-UP) The chef was a runner-up for the season.
(WIN) The chef won the Elimination Challenge.
(HIGH) The chef was selected as one of the top entries in the Elimination Challenge, but did not win.
(IN) The chef was not selected as one of the top or bottom entries in the Elimination Challenge and was safe.
(LOW) The chef was selected as one of the bottom entries in the Elimination Challenge, but was not eliminated.
(OUT) The chef lost the Elimination Challenge.

== Episodes ==
No. overall	No. in season	Title	Original release date	US viewers (millions)
261	1	"First Impressions"	April 1, 2021	0.82
Quickfire Challenge: In teams of three, the chefs were tasked with combining their favorite ingredients together into one cohesive dish. The winning team received immunity from elimination and an advantage in the Elimination Challenge.: Brown Team: Kiki, Sara, Sasha; Blue Team: Chris, Roscoe, Shota; Red Team: Avishar, Byron, Nelson; Green Team: Dawn, Gabe, Jamie; Yellow Team: Brittanny, Gabriel, Maria; Winners: Kiki, Sara, Sasha (Harissa Seared Halibut with Meyer Lemon & Anchovy Salsa Verde, Roasted Hot Pepper Relish & Herb Salad); Elimination Challenge: The chefs created dishes featuring one of five game birds found in Oregon: quail, duck, chukar, turkey, or squab. As the winners of the Quickfire Challenge, Kiki, Sara, and Sasha were able to choose their proteins; the remaining contestants were randomly assigned theirs. The dishes were judged through a blind tasting.: Quail: Kiki, Sara, Sasha; Duck: Gabe, Roscoe, Shota; Chukar: Avishar, Brittanny, Nelson; Turkey: Chris, Dawn, Jamie; Squab: Byron, Gabriel, Maria; Winner: Sara (Glazed Quail with Green Beans, Charred Dates & Grilled Eggplant Coconut Yogurt); Eliminated: Roscoe (Duck Adobo with Sweet Potato Dumplings)
262	2	"Trouble Brewing"	April 8, 2021	0.73
Quickfire Challenge: The chefs competed in a short order cooking-themed breakfast challenge. At regular intervals, one of the eight all-star judges would call out a breakfast order. The first two chefs to ring their bells then had 30 minutes to prepare eight portions of said dish. The winner received immunity from elimination.: Amar Santana (Steak & Eggs): Byron, Gabe; Melissa King (Dim Sum): Avishar, Shota; Kwame Onwuachi (Shrimp & Grits): Jamie, Sara; Dale Talde (Spam & Kimchi Fried Rice): Gabriel, Maria; Gregory Gourdet (Fried Egg & Veggie Hash): Dawn, Sasha; Carrie Baird ("Fancy Toast"): Brittanny, Kiki; Richard Blais ("The Kitchen Sink"): Chris, Nelson; Winner: Jamie (Cheddar Polenta with Cajun Gochujang Shrimp); Elimination Challenge: Initially, the chefs were asked to create individual dishes highlighting either beer or coffee; the brews were randomly assigned via knife draw. However, upon their arrival at the challenge site just hours before service, Tom Colicchio requested that the contestants pair up and create new dishes featuring both beer and coffee, using the ingredients they had already purchased for themselves. One member of the losing team was eliminated.: Winners: Avishar, Shota (Lobster Sunomono, Double Cream Coffee & Stout Reduction, Carbonated Grapes & Furikake); Eliminated: Sasha (Beer Marinated Pork Loin with Beets, Milk Stout Vinaigrette, Coffee Romesco & Coffee Hazelnut Crunch)
263	3	"Pan African Portland"	April 15, 2021	0.74
Quickfire Challenge: The chefs were given 45 minutes to create layered desserts in a Talenti gelato-sponsored challenge. The desserts were required to have at least three layers. The winner received immunity from elimination and US$10,000.: Winner: Avishar (Buckeye Bonbon with Brown Butter & Liquid Graham Cracker); Elimination Challenge: The chefs toured several Portland restaurants specializing in food from the African diaspora, including Jamaican, Guyanese, Haitian, and West African cuisine. They were then asked to cook dishes inspired by Pan-African flavors.: Winner: Dawn (Curried Goat, Crispy Roti with Fondant Potatoes & Green Pepper Sauce); Eliminated: Brittanny (Pickled Mackerel with Allspice Fritter, Red Stew Coconut Sauce & Charred Cucumber)
264	4	"Thrown for a Loop"	April 22, 2021	0.89
Quickfire Challenge: The chefs were given 30 minutes to create a dish evoking a food memory, using Campbell's soup products. The winner received immunity from elimination and US$10,000.: Winner: Chris (Grilled Cheese Panzanella with Tomato Soup Vinaigrette & Pickled Shallots); Elimination Challenge: The chefs ventured to Mt. View Orchards in the Hood River Valley, where they were tasked with cooking savory dishes incorporating locally grown fruit. The contestants also did not have access to any vegetables in the Top Chef pantry.: Winner: Gabe (Smoked & Glazed Plums & Orchard Fruit Jus with Pork & Chicken); Eliminated: Kiki (Apple Glazed Fried Chicken, Grilled & Pickled Peaches with Creamy Polenta)
265	5	"Meet You at the Drive-In"	April 29, 2021	0.89
Quickfire Challenge: The chefs created dishes inspired by the mother figures in their lives. The dishes also had to incorporate roses or rose products, in reference to Portland's nickname as the "City of Roses". The winner received immunity from elimination and an advantage in the Elimination Challenge.: Winner: Chris (Labouyi "Cornmeal Porridge" with Rose Water & Candied Pistachios); Elimination Challenge: The chefs, split into two teams, competed head-to-head catering for patrons at a pop-up drive-in theater located at the Portland Expo Center. As the winner of the Quickfire Challenge, Chris was able to join the team of his choosing. Each team was responsible for six dishes, which had to be inspired by the following film genres: comedy, drama, action, sci-fi, horror, and romance. The judges and guest diners voted for their favorite dishes in each round. In the event of a 3-3 tie, the best overall dish determined the winning team. The chef with the judges' favorite dish received US$10,000.: Green Team: Avishar, Byron, Dawn, Gabe, Maria; Yellow Team: Chris, Gabriel, Jamie, Nelson, Sara, Shota; Winning Team: Green Team; Winner: Byron (Comedy: Korean Style Gochujang Fried Chicken); Eliminated: Jamie (Comedy: Sticky Fried Chicken Wings & Fish Sauce Glaze)
266	6	"Stumptown U.S.A."	May 6, 2021	0.90
Quickfire Challenge: The chefs cooked dishes featuring local Oregon mushrooms and Better Than Bouillon products. In reference to another Portland nickname, "Stumptown", the contestants were forced to use tree stumps as prep tables. Instead of immunity from elimination, the winner received US$10,000.: Winner: Gabriel (Seared Foie Gras with Fried Chanterelles, Oyster Mushrooms, Oven Roasted Figs & Herbs); Elimination Challenge: The chefs traveled to Cascade Locks and paired up to create surf and turf dishes featuring local fish, game proteins, and produce for members of the Confederated Tribes of the Umatilla Indian Reservation. Both members of the losing team were eliminated.: Winners: Sara, Shota (Smoked Smelt Crusted Rabbit Loin, Smoked Smelt & Kabocha Squash Purée, Pickled Smelt); Eliminated: Gabriel, Nelson (Crispy Skin Steelhead, Antelope, Chanterelles & Berries)
267	7	"Feeding the Frontlines"	May 13, 2021	0.85
Quickfire Challenge: The chefs were given the chance to redo a past failed dish, which could be drawn from mishaps in real life or a blunder made earlier in the competition. The dishes had to incorporate ingredients from the "second chance pantry", which ranged from overripe produce to moldy cheese to scrapped proteins. The winner received immunity from elimination.: Winner: Shota ("Aradaki" Soy Braised Fish Head); Elimination Challenge: The chefs were recruited by chef José Andrés to join his nonprofit organization World Central Kitchen. He then asked them to cook meals to be delivered to frontline workers at three local Portland hospitals: Legacy Emanuel Medical Center, Oregon Health & Science University Hospital, and the Legacy Good Samaritan Medical Center. Their meals needed to be reheatable and include a protein, a vegetable, and a starch/grain.: Winner: Jamie (Kimchi Tofu Soup, Bulgogi Braised Pork, Eggplant & Steamed Rice); Eliminated: Avishar (Bengali Style Beef Curry with Chana Cauliflower & Basmati Rice)
268	8	"Restaurant Wars"	May 20, 2021	0.78
Elimination Challenge: The chefs, separated into two teams of four, competed in a non-traditional Restaurant Wars. Each team was tasked with creating a chef's table concept for their pop-up restaurant and serving a seven-course tasting menu for the judges and all-star panel. The judges and all-stars were seated directly in front of the kitchen, giving them the opportunity to watch the contestants cook during service. The teams were not provided a waitstaff, and were responsible for all aspects of customer service themselves, including interacting with the diners, refilling drinks, and clearing the table. The teams could divide up the labor however they wanted. From the winning team, an individual winner was declared.: Kokosón: Byron, Jamie, Maria (FOH), Shota (EC); Drink: Matcha Limonada; First Course (Shota & Maria): Eggplant with Sesame Mole & Ham Furikake; Second Course (Byron & Jamie): Cured Sockeye Salmon with Rocoto Curry Sauce & Crispy Quinoa; Third Course (Maria): Beef Lengua Sando with Pickled Mustard, Onions & Dipping Sauce; Fourth Course (Shota): Lotus Root Shiso with Chopped Rockfish & Ume Paste; Fifth Course (Jamie & Byron): Short Rib with Galbi Glaze, Quail Egg, Puffed Rice & Salsa Morita; Sixth Course (Team Dish): Hot Pot Zōsui with Shrimp Machaca & Seafood Broth; Seventh Course (Jamie & Byron): Tres Leches Steamed Cake with Coconut Condensed Milk & Pineapple; Penny: Chris, Dawn, Gabe, Sara; Drink: Blood Orange Green Juice; Amuse-bouche (Gabe): Heirloom Corn Tostada with Fat Bastard Oyster & Cured Snapper; First Course (Dawn): Warm Crab Salad in a Corn Puff & Island Coconut Sauce; Second Course (Sara): Halibut Crudo with Ajoblanco Sauce & Confit Green Tomato; Third Course (Dawn): Seared Scallop with Creole XO & Ham Hock Broth; Fourth Course (Sara): Crispy Salmon Skin with Pak Choi, Turnips & Hazelnut Brown Butter Sauce; Fifth Course (Chris): Shrimp Tortellini en Brodo with Seafood Broth; Sixth Course (Gabe): Charred Octopus with Mole Verde, Squash & Serrano Chili; Seventh Course (Chris): Kelp Ice Cream with Cocoa Nib Meringue, Toasted Hazelnut & Seaweed Salt; Winning Team: Kokosón; Winner: Maria; Eliminated: Sara
269	9	"Portland-ia"	May 27, 2021	0.83
Quickfire Challenge: The chefs created dishes using ingredients with reputations for being hipster, such as hemp oil, almond flour, kombucha, and milk substitutes. They were also restricted to using vintage kitchen equipment and appliances. Portlandia stars Fred Armisen and Carrie Brownstein served as guest judges. The winner received an advantage in the Elimination Challenge. Beginning with this challenge, immunity from elimination was no longer available as a reward.: Winner: Dawn (Fonio & Semolina Quickbread with Pancetta Jam, Pear Butter & Goat Butter); Elimination Challenge: The chefs had to develop and write out a recipe fit for home cooks to prepare within 90 minutes. Upon their arrival at the challenge site, they were informed that all-star alumni chefs would be testing their written recipes. The contestants' dishes and the all-stars' versions were then compared side-by-side by the judges. As the winner of the Quickfire Challenge, Dawn was given an extra 15 minutes of cooking time.: Winner: Gabe (Banana Leaf Steamed Black Cod with Crispy Skin & Salsa Veracruzana); Eliminated: Chris (Sorghum Gnocchi, Green Romesco, Braised Dandelion Greens & Saucisson Sec)
270	10	"Tournament of Tofu"	June 3, 2021	0.77
Quickfire Challenge: The chefs made custom dishes based on the judges' preferred flavor combinations using ingredients from Chipotle Mexican Grill. Tom Colicchio, Gail Simmons, and Padma Lakshmi were each assigned two chefs. Each judge would declare their favorite dish between their two assigned chefs. Of the three favorites, Richard Blais declared an overall winner. The winner received US$10,000. The chef who made each judge's favorite dish is listed below in italics.: Tom (Tangy & Crunchy): Byron, Dawn; Gail (Smoky & Charred): Gabe, Jamie; Padma (Spicy & Tart): Maria, Shota; Winner: Dawn (Wood Fired Pork Loin with Crispy Onions & Poblano Avocado Purée); Elimination Challenge: The chefs competed in a multi-round elimination tournament, set at the Portland Japanese Garden, featuring tofu. The contestants were initially split into three pairs, with each pair cooking head-to-head using a specific texture of tofu: medium, firm, or extra firm. The winner of each head-to-head battle was declared safe, while the three losing chefs would compete in the second round with fried tofu. The two losing chefs of the second round would then compete in the third and final round, which required them to make a dessert using soft tofu. The loser of the third round was eliminated from the competition. In the event of a 5-5 tie, the judges consulted and chose the winner of the round. The winner of each round is listed below in italics.: Round 1: Medium Tofu: Maria (Soy Braised Tofu Tamale With Masa & Soybean) vs. Shota (Soy Braised Tofu, Soy Milk Yuba, Shira ae & Tofu Crumbles) (5:5); Firm Tofu: Gabe (Marinated & Braised Tofu with Cabbage, Soybean & Miso Chicken Jus) vs. Dawn (West Indian Style Brown Stew Tofu with Charred Vegetables) (5:5); Extra Firm Tofu: Byron (Pan-Seared Tofu with Daikon Salad & Soy Vinaigrette) vs. Jamie (Banh Xeo with Sauteed Tofu & Fresh Herbs) (1:9); Round 2: Fried Tofu: Maria (Fried Tofu Steak with Asian Mole & Fried Soy Bean Crumble) vs. Dawn (Nashville Hot Tofu with Pickles & Soy Buttermilk Ranch) vs. Byron (Guajillo Fried Tofu with Grilled Shrimp, Smoke Fried Tofu Puree, Prosciutto & Crispy Tofu Skins) (9:0:1); Round 3: Soft Tofu: Dawn (Mango Tofu Mousse, Macerated Mango, Diced soft tofu & Sesame Okara Crumble) vs. Byron (Soft Tofu Mousse with Honey, Okara & Dried Mango Granola); Eliminated: Byron
271	11	"Blind Ambitions"	June 10, 2021	0.83
Quickfire Challenge: The chefs competed in the "black box challenge", a recurring challenge from Top Chef France. The chefs were first split into pairs. Due to the odd number of contestants remaining, Brooke Williamson temporarily joined to fill in. After entering the black box, which covered the chefs in total darkness, the first team member had 15 minutes to taste, smell, and feel a mystery dish, prepared by guest judge Gabriel Rucker, and begin trying to recreate it. Once their time expired, the second team member, who was not allowed to communicate with their teammate, had 15 minutes to do the same and pick up where their partner left off. In the final 5 minutes, both team members were allowed to enter the black box, with the lights on, to sample the mystery dish again and fix any mistakes with their recreation.: Red Team: Jamie, Maria; Blue Team: Dawn, Brooke; Yellow Team: Gabe, Shota; Winners: Dawn, Brooke (Squab with Roasted Carrots & Pears, Carrot Mustard Purée & Gribiche); Elimination Challenge: The chefs received care packages from their families, each containing ten ingredients. They were then asked to create dishes using their gifted ingredients. While the contestants were not required to use every ingredient in their care packages, they were encouraged to utilize as many as possible. The dishes were served at the Scholls Lodge in the Tualatin Valley.: Winner: Gabe (Panuchos with Braised Pork, Kale & Pickled Red Onion); Eliminated: Maria (Grilled Wings with Miso & Ginger, Bean Sprout Salad & Tequila Cilantro Vinaigrette)
272	12	"The Cheesier the Better"	June 17, 2021	0.89
Quickfire Challenge: The chefs competed in a challenge paying homage to the Oregon Trail. The contestants had to produce modern dishes using only ingredients the settlers would have had on their journey through the Oregon Trail, including flour, lard, coffee, molasses, dried fruits, meats, and herbs. Any ingredients from the Top Chef pantry were off-limits. Vitaly Paley served as a guest judge. The winner received an advantage in the Elimination Challenge.: Winner: Jamie (Pan Seared Salmon with Walnut Pepper Sauce); Elimination Challenge: The chefs were moved to the Oregon Coast for the final rounds of the competition. They then visited the Tillamook Creamery, where they learned about the cheese-making process and sampled several varieties of Tillamook cheddar. Taking inspiration from Massimo Bottura's famous Parmigiano-Reggiano dish, each chef was responsible for creating a dish utilizing cheddar in five different ways. The winner received US$10,000. As the winner of the Quickfire Challenge, Jamie was given an extra 30 minutes of cooking time.: Winner: Shota (Tofu Cheddar Manjū with Cheddar Dashi, Smoked Cheddar Oil, Cheddar Tofu Miso & Cheddar Tuile); Eliminated: Jamie (Sea Bass with Crispy Cheddar, Cheddar Spaetzle, Spiced Cheese Sauce, Cheese Broth Bok Choy & Pickled Cheese Curds)
273	13	"Shellfishly Delicious"	June 24, 2021	0.82
Quickfire Challenge: The chefs went clam digging at the Yager Creek Flat in Netarts Bay. They then cooked dishes using their harvested clams. The winner received an advantage in the Elimination Challenge.: Winner: Gabe ("Sopa de Mariscos" Poached Gaper & Butter Clams in Broth); Elimination Challenge: In honor of Portland native James Beard, the chefs had to prepare both a hot dish and cold dish featuring one of his favorite ingredients: Dungeness crab. The contestants were able to catch their own crabs at Kelly's Brighton Marina in Nehalem Bay. Top Chef Masters alumna Naomi Pomeroy joined the judges and all-stars as a guest diner. As the winner of the Quickfire Challenge, Gabe received an extra US$100 towards his shopping budget.: Winner: Shota (Dungeness Crab Nigiri with Yuzu Koshō Aioli & Pickled Ginger; Braised Purple Daikon with Dungeness Crab Salad, Soy & Sherry Vinaigrette & Persimmon)
274	14	"The Next Top Chef Is..."	July 1, 2021	0.89
Elimination Challenge: The chefs had to cook the best four-course progressive meal of their lives. Each finalist received help from one sous chef, consisting of previously eliminated competitors Jamie, Maria, and Byron. Dawn was assisted by Jamie, Shota was assisted by Byron, and Gabe was assisted by Maria. The meals were served at the Willamette Valley Vineyards to the judges, all-stars, and guest diners Naomi Pomeroy and Peter Cho.: Dawn: First Course: Lamb Tartare with Tomato & Celery Salad, Beef Tendon Puff & Rice Honey Bread; Second Course: Green Gumbo with Seafood & Fermented Rice Fritter; Third Course: Braised Beef Cheek, Black-Eyed Peas & Buttered Turnips; Fourth Course: Yam Bread Pudding, Butter Pecan Anglaise with Purple Yam & Apple Compote; Gabe: First Course: Fried Cochinita Pibil Head Cheese with Habanero Ash Emulsion, Avocado Mousse & Kumquat Sauce; Second Course: Scallop Aguachile with Fermented Pineapple $ Roasted Scallop Oil; Third Course: Short Rib with Chichilo Negro Mole, Mushrooms & Pickled Persimmons; Fourth Course: Candied Delicata Squash with Cafe Mexicano Ice Cream; Shota: First Course: Sashimi 3-Ways, Mackerel, Cured Salmon & Tuna with Soy Sauce; Second Course: Sautéed Water Spinach, Sautéed Burdock Root, White Miso Burdock Root Purée with Octopus Karaage; Third Course: Beef Tongue Curry with Braised Turnips & Fukujinzuke Pickles; Fourth Course: Hoji Tea Cheesecake with Cedar Smoked Gelato; Winner: Gabe; Runners-up: Shota, Dawn

== Last Chance Kitchen ==
No.	Title	Original air date
1	"It Takes a Thick Skin"	April 8, 2021
Challenge: The chefs were given 25 minutes to create dishes featuring ingredients with thick skins or hard exteriors.: Roscoe: Peanut Velouté with Jackfruit Fritters, Clams, Shiitake Mushrooms; Sasha: Chicken Fried Oyster with Miso, Cherimoya & Green Apple Purée, Toasted Pistachios; Winner: Sasha; Eliminated: Roscoe
2	"One Pot Punch"	April 15, 2021
Challenge: The chefs were given 30 minutes to cook a meal using only one pot.: Sasha: Chicken Thigh Cacciatore with Red Bell Peppers, Calabrian Chilis, Mushrooms & Raisins; Brittanny: Corn Chowder with Cod & Crab; Winner: Sasha; Eliminated: Brittanny
3	"Raw Redemption"	April 22, 2021
Challenge: The chefs were given 20 minutes to prepare dishes featuring raw proteins.: Sasha: Citrus Marinated Yellowtail & Avocado Purée with Calabrian Chili Oil; Kiki: Scallop Ceviche with Peppered Relish & Tamarind; Winner: Kiki; Eliminated: Sasha
4	"Last Chance Chicken"	April 29, 2021
Challenge: The chefs were asked to cook with various parts of a chicken. To determine their time limit and ingredients, the contestants played a game of chicken with each other. They eventually settled for a 25-minute timer and five chicken parts (liver, oysters, skin, thighs, feet) to incorporate into their dishes.: Kiki: Chicken Drumstick & Fennel, Napa Cabbage, Radicchio Slaw with Stock; Jamie: Chili Chicken Stock with Grilled Chicken Thighs, Liver & Mousse in Red Curry & Baguette; Winner: Jamie; Eliminated: Kiki
5	"Who Will Return to Top Chef?"	May 6, 2021
Challenge: The chefs had 35 minutes to create elevated versions of the first dishes they ever cooked. The winner returned to the main competition. Due to a knee injury, Nelson opted out of competing any further.: Jamie: Peasant Style Lap Cheong Crispy Fried Rice with Lemon Juice & Apples; Gabriel: Filet Mignon & Corn Custard with Porcini & Anchovy Butter; Winner: Jamie; Eliminated: Gabriel
6	"Five Way Fight For Your Life"	May 6, 2021
Challenge: The five previously eliminated chefs were given 30 minutes to cook any dish. The winner would continue on in Last Chance Kitchen, receiving yet another opportunity to rejoin the main competition.: Brittanny: Pork Schnitzel with Caper & Lemon Brown Butter Sauce with Celery Salad; Gabriel: Watermelon & Tomato Salad with Smoked Feta; Kiki: Sardines & Preserved Lemon Yogurt with Chermoula Green Sauce & Pomegranate Relish; Roscoe: Farro & Shrimp Served "Gullah" Style with Pancetta; Sasha: Ricotta Cavatelli with Harissa, Chili & Tomato Sauce, Fontina & Espelette Pepper Relish; Winner: Sasha; Eliminated: Brittanny, Gabriel, Kiki, Roscoe
7	"Bloody Good Dish"	May 13, 2021
Challenge: The chefs had 30 minutes to create dishes using blood-themed ingredients, including blood oranges, Bloody Mary mix, blood sausages, pig hearts, and pig blood.: Sasha: Brown Butter Basted Blood Sausage with Beet Purée, Pickled Onions & Blood Orange Segments; Avishar: "Bloody Good Breakfast" - Blood Sausage with Blood Scrambled Eggs, Blood Orange & Blood Vinaigrette; Winner: Sasha; Eliminated: Avishar
8	"Three Perfect Bites"	May 20, 2021
Challenge: The chefs had 30 minutes to prepare a three-course progressive menu. However, each course had to be the size of an amuse-bouche.: Sasha: First Course: Tomatoes with Feta & Lemon Sumac Vinaigrette; Second Course: Scallop with Pesto; Third Course: Flank Steak with Creamy Caramelized Onion Purée; Sara: First Course: Roasted Red Pepper Soup with Fish Sauce & Curry; Second Course: Scallop with Celery Root & Caviar; Third Course: Wagyu Steak with Butter Braised Cabbage & Shiitake Mushrooms; Winner: Sara; Eliminated: Sasha
9	"Start Your Engines"	May 27, 2021
Challenge: The chefs were allowed to cook any dish. However, there was no visible timer in the Top Chef kitchen. Instead, their time limit would be determined by how long it took Tom Colicchio to finish ten laps around the Portland International Raceway using a BMW X6 M. Once Tom returned to the kitchen, the contestants had one minute to finish completing their dishes.: Sara: Beef Braised Turnips with Pickled Nori & Shiitake Mushrooms; Chris: Halibut with Seafood & Pepper Broth with Fennel Oil; Winner: Sara; Eliminated: Chris
10	"Bento Battle"	June 3, 2021
Challenge: The chefs had 30 minutes to create their own versions of a bento. Each bento needed to include a rice or noodle dish, a meat or fish, a vegetable, and a pickled component.: Sara: Green Tea Ume Rice; Pan Fried Quail Eggs in Uni Cream & Buddha Hands; Oven Roasted Eggplants with Sesame; Daikon Pickles with Shiso Lychee & Bamboo Shoot; Byron: Salmon Tataki with Umeboshi Glaze; String Beans with Yuzu Koshō; Sushi Rice with Wakame; Pickled Shiso Eggplant; Winner: Byron; Eliminated: Sara
11	"Last Chance Kitchen Finale"	June 3, 2021
Challenge: The last remaining chef competed head-to-head against three non-eliminated contestants. First, the non-eliminated chefs each grabbed ten ingredients from the Top Chef pantry to put into their own personal boxes. The Last Chance Kitchen contender, without knowing which box belonged to whom, had to choose three boxes of ingredients to cook with, determining their opponents for the challenge, and subsequently chose the order in which they wanted to face each chef. To earn their spot back into the main competition, the eliminated chef was required to win two out of three rounds. The chefs had 20 minutes for each round.: Round 1; Byron: Salad with Bacon, Guajillo & Raisin Purée, Shaved Manchego; Gabe: Guajillo Braised Radicchio, Bacon & Golden Raisin Jam, Braised Brassica & Shaved Manchego; Winner: Gabe; Round 2; Byron: Pan Roasted NY Strip Steak with Chanterelle Saffron Purée, Roasted Tomatoes & Mushroom Chipotle Sauce; Maria: Steak with Mushroom & Ancho Powder Marinade, Grilled Tomatoes, Onion Saffron Sauce & Sautéed Mushrooms; Winner: Byron; Round 3; Byron: Marinated & Grilled Pork with Turmeric & Coconut Sauce over Noodles; Jamie: Roasted Pork with Turmeric Serrano Chimichurri Sauce, Coconut Braised Kale, Crispy Rice Noodles; Winner: Jamie; Eliminated: Byron

== Controversy ==
In December 2020, about a month after filming ended in Portland, Gabe Erales, who would end up winning the competition, was fired from his executive chef position at Comedor in Austin. The day after the finale aired, the Austin American-Statesman reported that Erales "admitted to having a consensual sexual relationship" with a female coworker at Comedor in the summer of 2020. He later reduced the employee's work hours "based on her performance," Erales said, while he "continued to communicate with her in an unprofessional manner." Philip Speer, his former business partner and chef at Comedor, confirmed Erales was terminated due to "repeated violations of the company's ethics policy as it relates to harassment of women." Erales apologized on Instagram for his behavior, while the show declined to comment. Host and fellow producer Padma Lakshmi eventually spoke on the matter and stated, "As someone who has been sexually harassed, this topic is a serious one and merits openness. We filmed Top Chef in October of last year & were not aware of the allegations now coming out about Gabe. This should be investigated & the network should consider its best action." She added "no one has alleged sexual harassment on the record or otherwise to Bravo/Top Chef and we judges didn't have any indication of inappropriate behavior from Gabe during his time on set."
