= Mama Bird =

Defunct restaurant in Portland, Oregon, U.S.

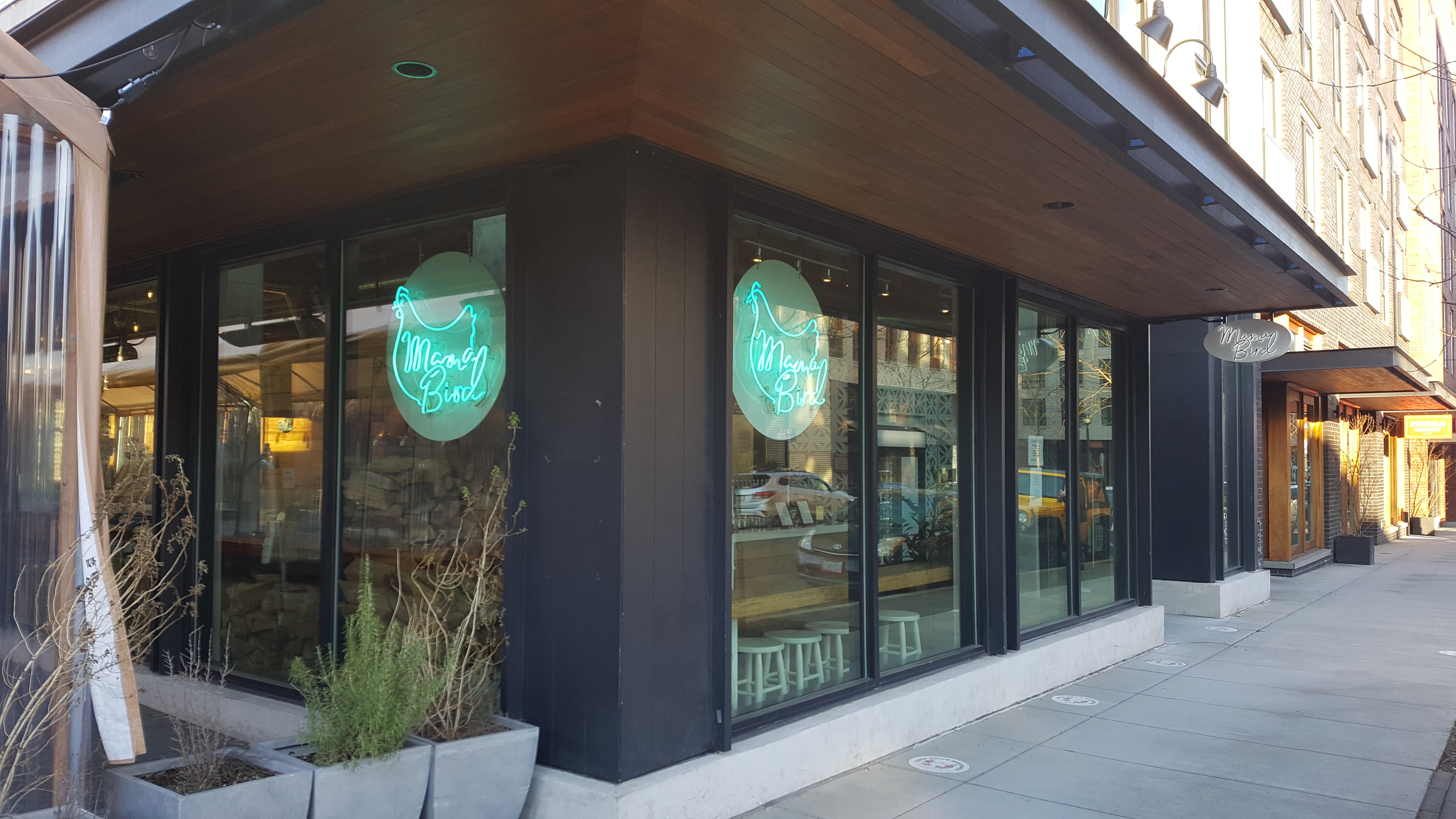
- The restaurant's exterior in 2022
- Interactive map of Mama Bird

Restaurant information
- Established: September 26, 2019
- Closed: January 26, 2025
- Owner: Gabriel Pascuzzi
- Location: 2145 Northwest Raleigh Street, Portland, Oregon, 97210, United States
- Coordinates: 45.5342°N 122.6956°W
- Website: mamabirdpdx.com

Mama Bird was a restaurant in Portland, Oregon, United States. In 2023, the counter service restaurant announced plans to expand the menu, add table service, and become known as Mama Bird Wood Fire Grill. Mama Bird closed permanently on January 26, 2025.

== Description ==
Mama Bird was a casual, counter-service restaurant in the Slabtown neighborhood of Portland's Northwest District, with a seating capacity of approximately 90 people. The interior had high ceilings, large windows, natural wood, neutral tones, and plants. Mama Bird's "allergy-friendly" menu focused on grilled chicken and vegetables. Pete Cottell of Willamette Week has said the menu "[split] the difference between comfort food and health food".

== History ==
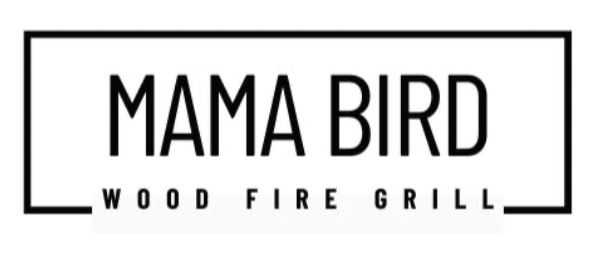
Logo for Mama Bird Wood Fire Grill

Gabriel Pascuzzi opened the restaurant on September 26, 2019. Soon after, Mama Bird closed temporarily because of smoke pollution complaints from neighbors. It reopened in November.

In June 2020, the restaurant donated $3 for each bird sold to Know Your Rights Camp, during the George Floyd protests. During the COVID-19 pandemic, the restaurant had patio service, as of September 2020.

Mama Bird closed permanently on January 26, 2025. Gabriel Pascuzzi converted the space into Bistecca Wood Fire Steakhouse, which is slated to close permanently in October 2026.

== Reception ==
In 2019, Eater Portland's Alex Frane included Mama Bird in his list of sixteen "quintessential" restaurant and bars in Slabtown. In 2021, the website's Brooke Jackson-Glidden said "Mama Bird is a godsend, with grilled chicken and vegetables that have a refreshing element of creativity and finesse".
