= Gabe Erales =

American celebrity chef

- Born: El Paso, Texas, US
- Education: University of Texas at Austin; Le Cordon Bleu
- Occupation: Executive Chef
- Television: Top Chef: Portland
- Website: gabeerales.com

Felix Gabriel "Gabe" Erales is an American chef specializing in modern Mexican cuisine based in Austin, Texas. In 2021, Erales won the eighteenth season of Top Chef, becoming the series' first Latino winner.

== Education ==
Erales graduated from Eastwood High School in El Paso, Texas then went on to get a BA and MA in Mechanical Engineering from the University of Texas at Austin and Master of Science in Mechanical Engineering from University of Oklahoma. He graduated from Austin’s Le Cordon Bleu.

== Career ==
Erales began working in restaurants at the age of 15 in El Paso, Texas and continued to do so throughout high school and college at University of Texas at Austin. After graduating from college, he worked as an engineer in the automotive and semiconductor industry but soon after shifted his focus to his culinary talents.

Erales went on to work in some of Austin's most notable restaurants (Fonda San Miguel, La Condesa, Qui, Odd Duck, Dai Due). After staging at Noma in Copenhagen, he went on to work for Noma during their Mexico pop-up in Tulum, Quintana Roo.

In 2006, Erales opened Dai Due Taqueria with Jesse Griffiths as the executive chef. The restaurant – focusing on tacos using wild game and fish – was located in Austin’s First Food Hall Fareground on Congress Avenue. He then opened the award winning Comedor restaurant, where he made famous the "bone marrow tacos".

In 2021, Erales competed in Top Chef: Portland, winning the season and its $250,000 grand prize. After shooting for Top Chef: Portland had ended, Erales was fired from his position as executive chef at Comedor due to violations of the restaurant's ethics policies. Erales has since issued an apology for his misconduct, which includes sexual harassment.

He is currently in the process of building a new restaurant called Bacalar Restaurant that is scheduled to open in 2023.

== Acclaim ==
Erales was featured in Tribeza’s Magnificent 7 in 2019. While working at Comedor (from April 2019 to December 2020) the restaurant was featured on Esquire’s ‘Best New Restaurants in America, 2019’ and Best Restaurant in Texas by Texas Monthly and Top 10 Best Restaurants in Austin 360 Eats. He was crowned the “Prince of Pork” two years in a row after winning the 2018 and 2019 Cochon555 Culinary Competition in Austin.

Erales also created a Culinary Scholarship fund called Niños De Maíz.

== Personal life ==
Gabe's parents are from Chetumal, Quintana Roo, Mexico. He has 6 siblings and is married with four children.
