= Stacked Sandwich Shop =

Defunct restaurant in Portland, Oregon, U.S.

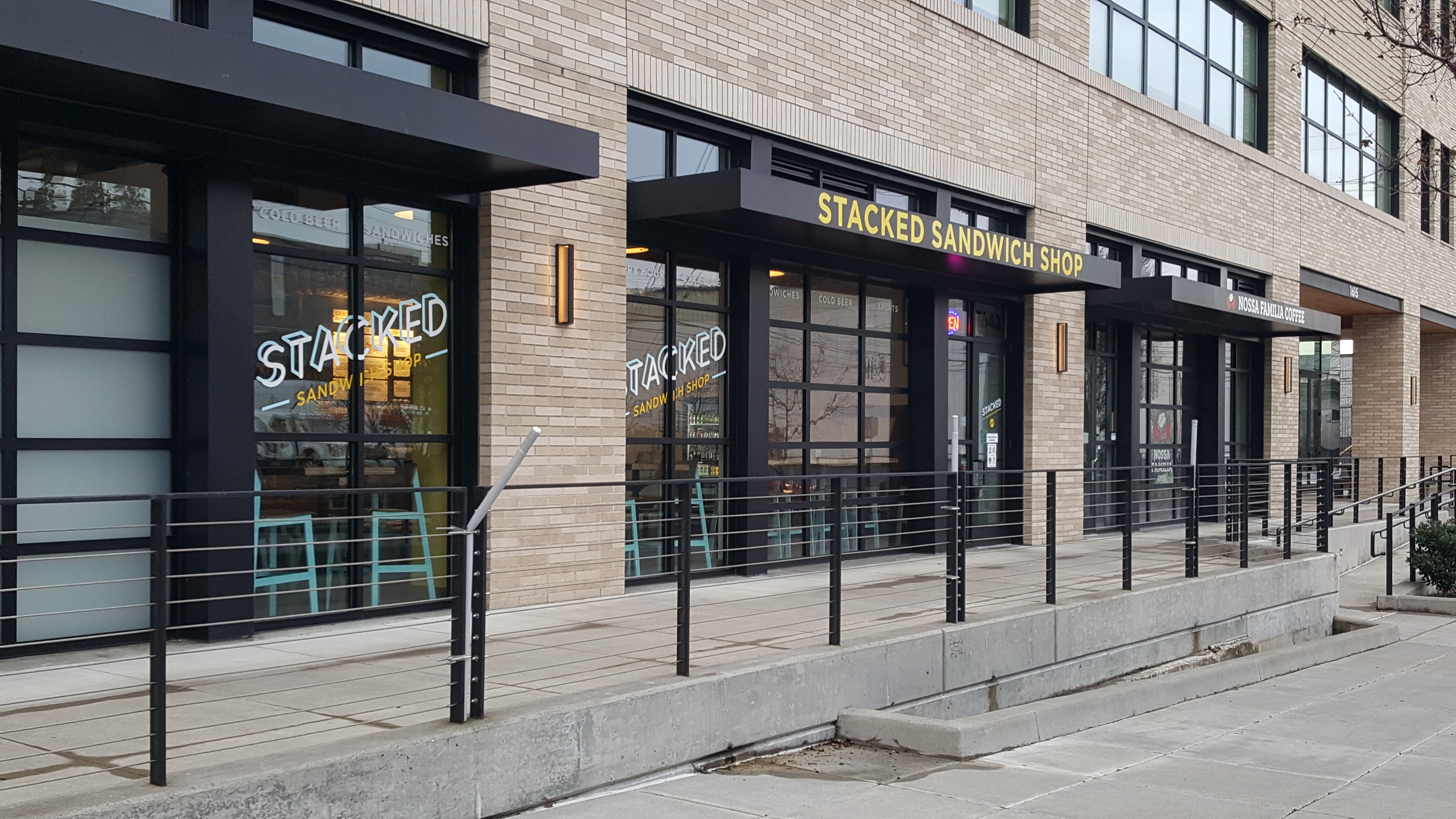
- The original restaurant's exterior in 2021
- Interactive map of Stacked Sandwich Shop

Restaurant information
- Established: February 17, 2017
- Owner: Gabriel Pascuzzi
- Location: 2175 Northwest Raleigh Street, Portland, Multnomah, Oregon, 97210, United States
- Coordinates: 45.5344°N 122.6959°W
- Website: stackedsandwichshop.com

Stacked Sandwich Shop was a sandwich shop in Portland, Oregon. Gabriel Pascuzzi operated the original restaurant in southeast Portland's Hosford-Abernethy neighborhood from 2017 to 2021. The business operated in a different location for several months in 2023. The second iteration of Stacked was housed alongside Pascuzzi's second Feel Good restaurant, in a space previously occupied by Sunshine Noodles in northwest Portland's Northwest District.

== Description ==
Sandwiches included an oxtail French dip and a turkey Reuben with purple sauerkraut, as well as roast beef, a turkey club, and grilled cheese. In 2023, the restaurant served a roasted pork coppa with provolone and a green curry fried chicken sandwich with fish sauce. The menu also included Caesar and wedge salads.

== History ==
Gabriel Pascuzzi opened the original restaurant in southeast Portland's Hosford-Abernethy neighborhood on February 17, 2017. Stacked began serving brunch in October 2017, and also offered special holiday meals. A new brunch menu was launched in 2019.

Stacked closed temporarily during the COVID-19 pandemic. In December 2021, Pascuzzi announced plans to close the restaurant permanently on December 19, citing supply chain issues and high meat costs as reasons.

In February 2023, Pascuzzi confirmed plans to reopen Stacked in a shared space with a second location of his restaurant Feel Good. The businesses operated in the space previously occupied by Sunshine Noodles, in northwest Portland's Northwest District. Feel Good and Stacked Sandwich shop opened on April 11. Later in 2023, Pascuzzi confirmed plans to close Stacked, replacing the sandwich shop with Tip Top Burger Shop. An exact closing date was not announced, but a menu transition was expected on November 7.

== Reception ==
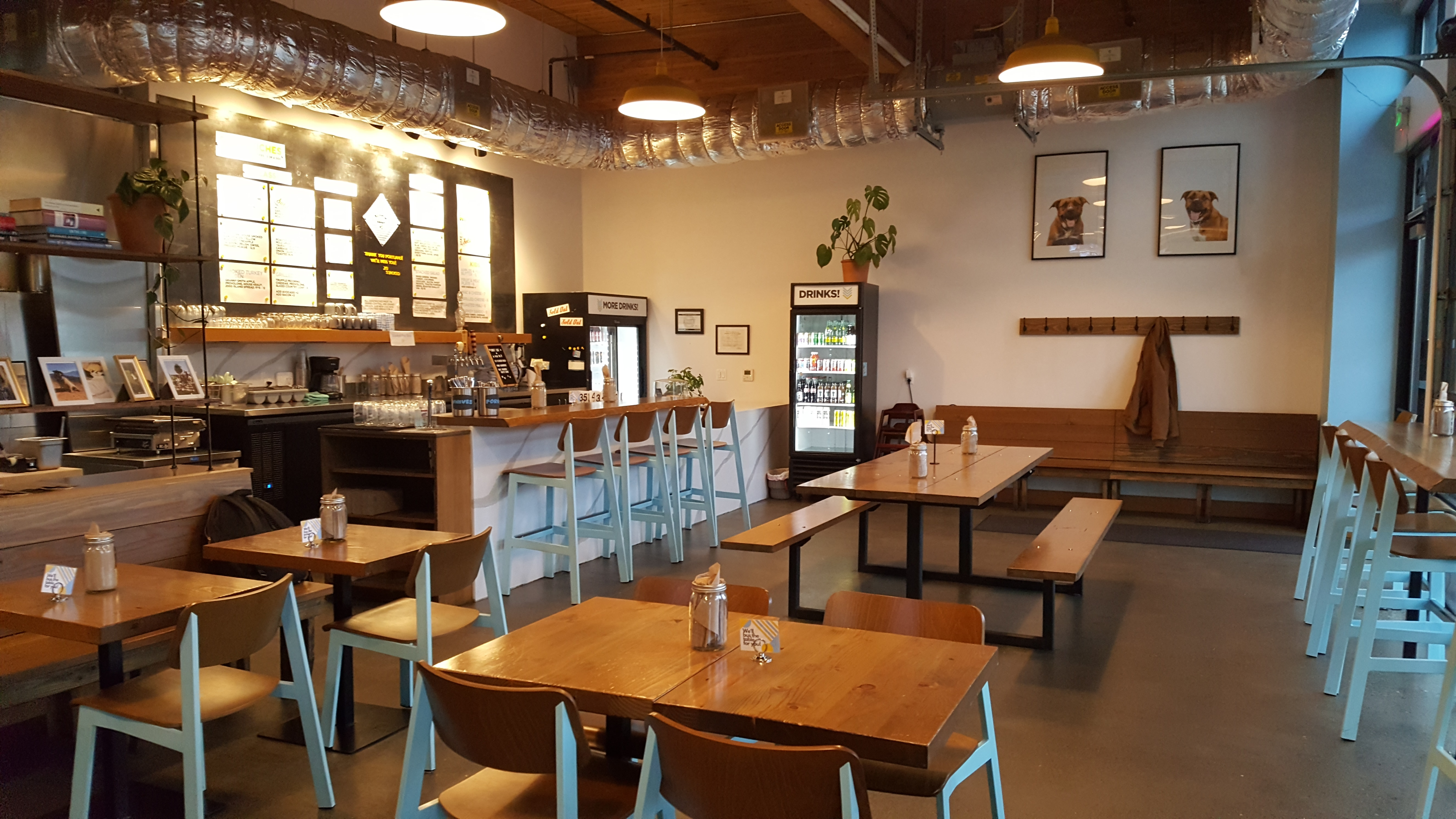
Interior of the original restaurant, 2021

In 2017, Eater Portland nominated Stacked as one of "Portland's Game-Changing Restaurant of the Year". Additionally, Pascuzzi was nominated for Chef of the Year for his work at Stacked. Michael Russell of The Oregonian named Stacked one of "Portland's new sandwich All Stars of 2017". He also included Stacked in a list of the city's 50 "most notable" restaurant openings of 2017 and said the oxtail French dip was "already one of Portland's best" sandwiches. In 2020, Russell wrote, "Few sandwiches turned more heads in the back half of the 2010s than the oxtail French dip at Stacked."

Tasting Table selected Stacked's oxtail French dip for Oregon in a 2017 list of the best sandwiches in each U.S. state. Benjamin Tepler of Portland Monthly complimented Stacked's wedge salad and said "Pascuzzi might make the best wedge in the city". In 2020, Alex Frane included Stacked in Eater Portland's list of fourteen "excellent" sandwich shops in Portland.

== See also ==
- COVID-19 pandemic in Portland, Oregon
- Impact of the COVID-19 pandemic on the meat industry in the United States
- Impact of the COVID-19 pandemic on the restaurant industry in the United States
