= Taku (restaurant) =

Restaurant in Seattle, Washington, U.S.

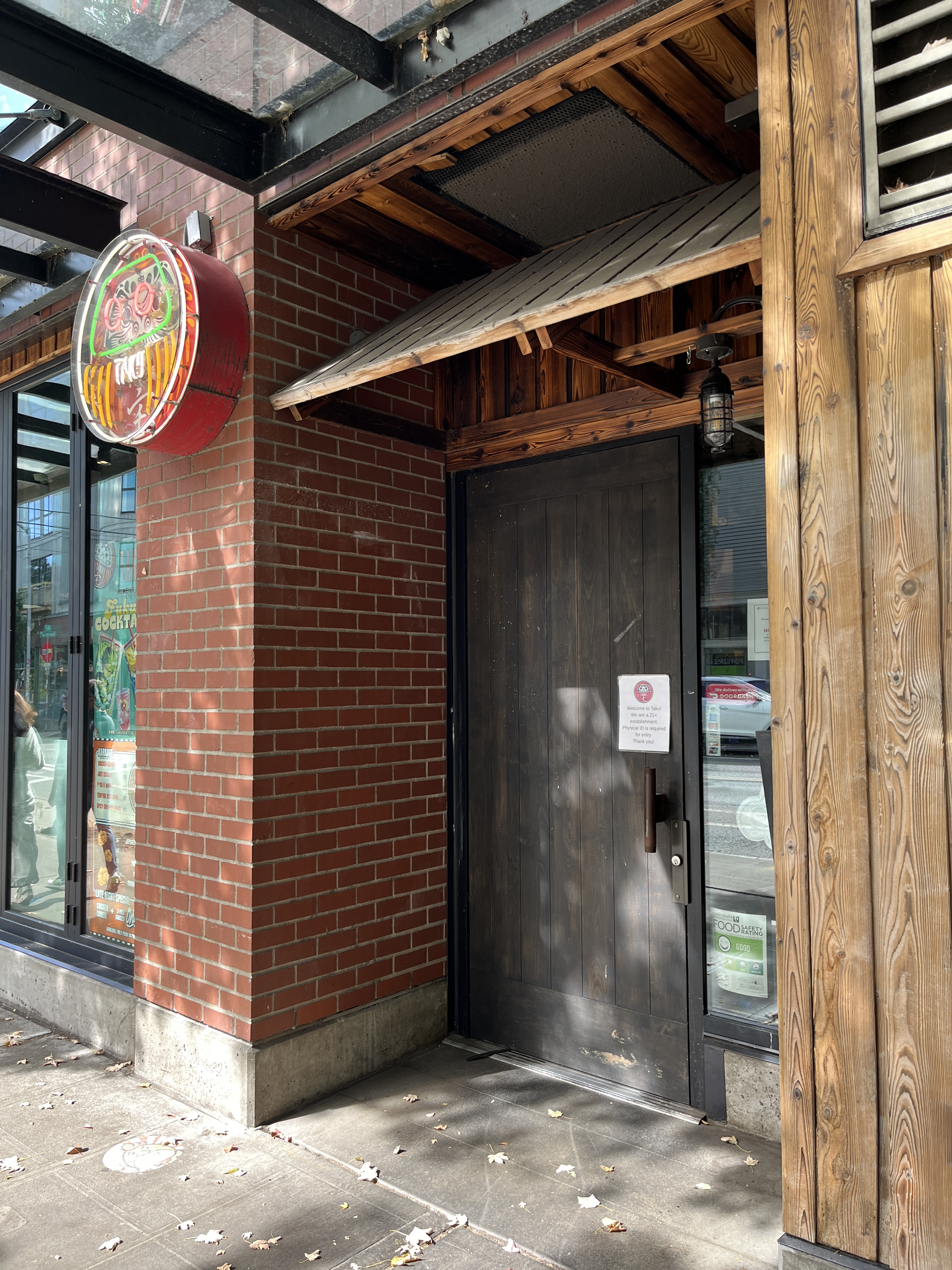
- The restaurant's exterior, 2024
- Interactive map of Taku

Restaurant information
- Established: 2020
- Closed: 2025
- Location: Seattle, Washington
- Coordinates: 47°36′51.1″N 122°19′22.8″W
- Website: www.takuseattle.com

Taku was a Japanese restaurant located in Seattle's Capitol Hill neighborhood at 706 East Pike Street. Owned by chef Shota Nakajima, the restaurant opened in 2020.

== Description ==
The name "Taku" means "table" in Japanese. Taku's menu offered marinated, battered and twice-fried karaage nuggets and wings. Additionally, it included a F*ck it Bucket, chicken karaage rice bowl, a curry karaage burger and a selection of classic Japanese sides like mac salad, furikake fries, cabbage salad and miso soup.

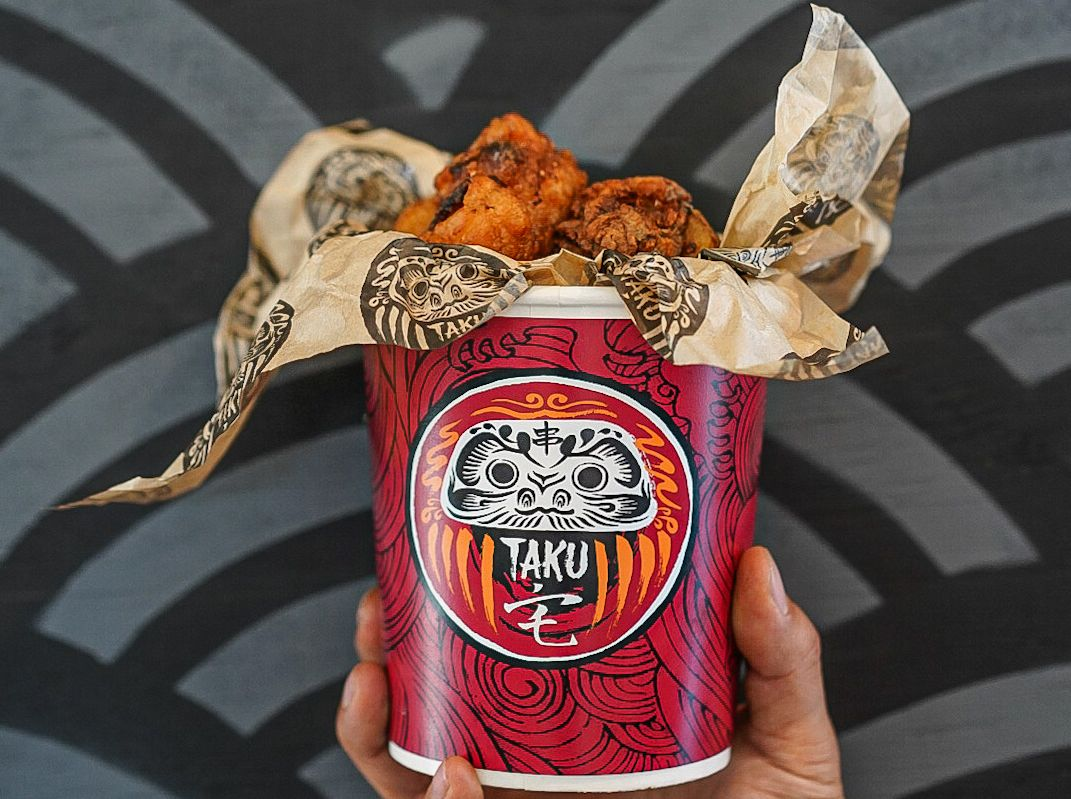
Container of twice-fried karaage

== History ==
The restaurant closed in 2025. It was replaced by Gol Mok Korean Market Bar.

== See also ==
- History of the Japanese in Seattle
- List of defunct restaurants of the United States
- List of Japanese restaurants
