= Shota Nakajima =

Japanese-American chef

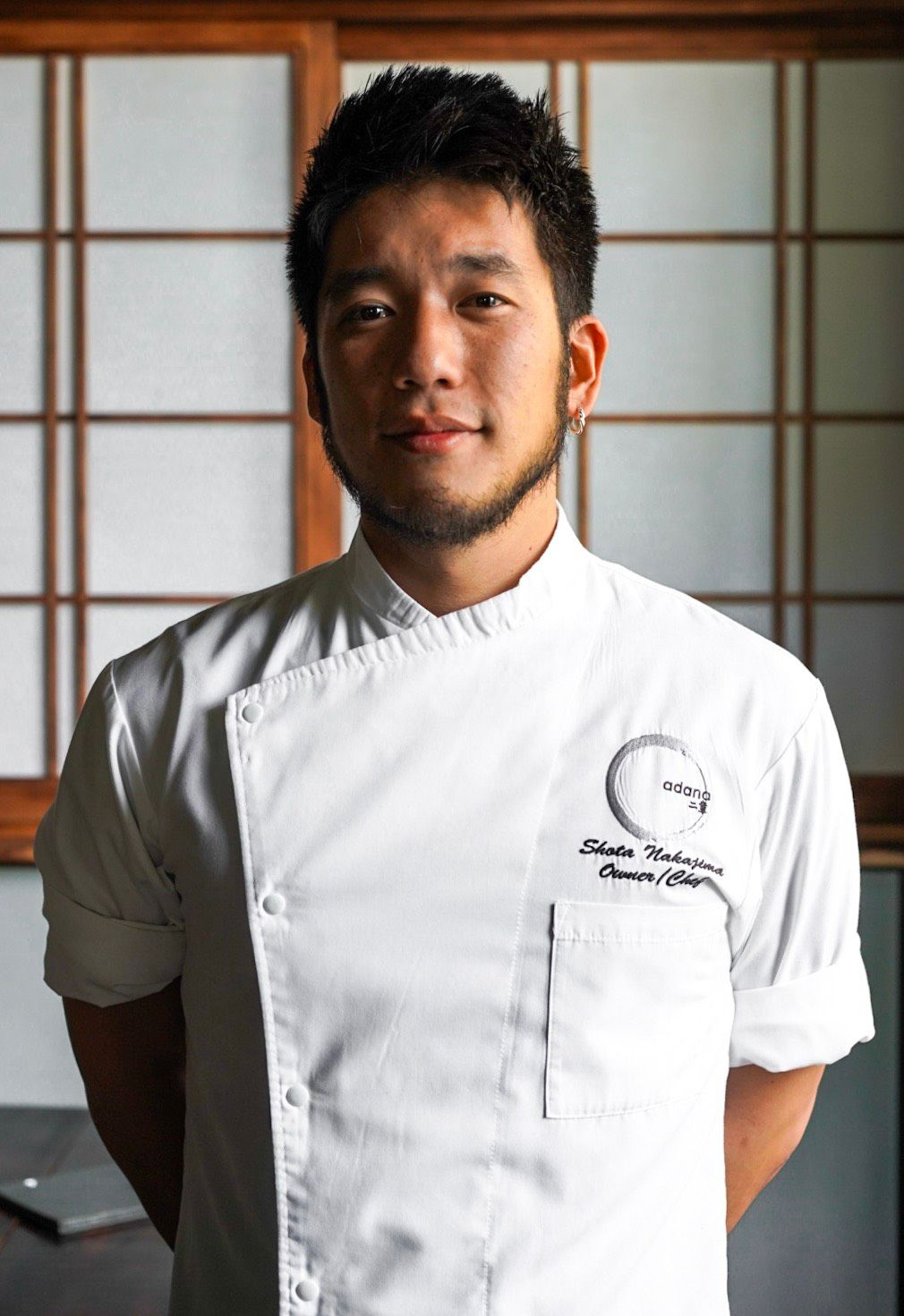
- Shota Nakajima
- Born: Tokyo, Japan
- Education: Tsuji Culinary Arts School
- Culinary career
- Current restaurants
- Taku, Seattle, WA (2020; 2021–2025)
- Previous restaurants
- Naka / Adana, Seattle (2015–2020); Banzai Teriyaki, Cle Elum, WA (2022); Kōbo Pizza
- Television shows
- Iron Chef Gauntlet (2017); Beat Bobby Flay (2018); Top Chef: Portland (2021); Bobby's Triple Threat (2023); 24 in 24: Last Chef Standing (2026)
- Website: shotanakajima.com

Shota Nakajima is a Japanese-American chef best known for competing on the eighteenth season of Top Chef in Portland, Oregon.

== Early life and education ==
Nakajima was born in Japan, and raised in Seattle, Washington. At 18, he moved to Osaka to attend the Tsuji Culinary Arts School. There, he apprenticed with chef Yasuhiko Sakamoto. He later returned to Seattle and worked for chef Taichi Kitamura at Sushi Kappo Tamura from 2011–2012.

== Television appearances ==
Nakajima appeared on Food Network's Iron Chef Gauntlet in 2017, where he was the fourth chef eliminated. In 2018, he appeared on Season 16, Episode 4 of Beat Bobby Flay. Nakajima won with his signature dish, tempura. In 2020, Nakajima competed on Top Chef: Portland, where he was one of three finalists. He was also voted Fan Favorite of the show. In Season 4 of Tournament of Champions, Nakajima reached the quarterfinals before losing to eventual winner Mei Lin.

== Chef and restaurateur ==
In 2014, Nakajima opened a catering business, Kappo Kitchen and later Naka, a kaiseki restaurant, in June 2015. In February 2017, Naka Kaiseki rebranded as Adana. In March 2020, Nakajima opened his restaurant Taku, an Osakan kushikatsu concept, in the Capitol Hill neighborhood of Seattle. Adana and Taku closed during the COVID-19 pandemic, but Taku reopened in May 2021 as a karaage restaurant. Taku is now permanently closed.

In late 2021, Nakajima began bottling his own teriyaki sauce, known as Make Umami, and selling it at Taku, Uwajimaya grocery stores, and on Amazon. In February 2022, Nakajima announced he was opening a teriyaki restaurant, Banzai Teriyaki, in Cle Elum, Washington. On June 23, 2022 Nakajima said he was no longer part of the Cle Elum project.

== Awards and accolades ==
- James Beard Foundation, Semifinalist, Rising Star Chef of the Year (2018)
- Eater, Young Guns Winner (2018)
- James Beard Foundation, Semifinalist, Rising Star Chef of the Year (2019)
- James Beard Foundation, Semifinalist, Rising Star Chef of the Year (2020)
