= Multnomah Whiskey Library =

Bar and restaurant in Portland, Oregon, U.S.

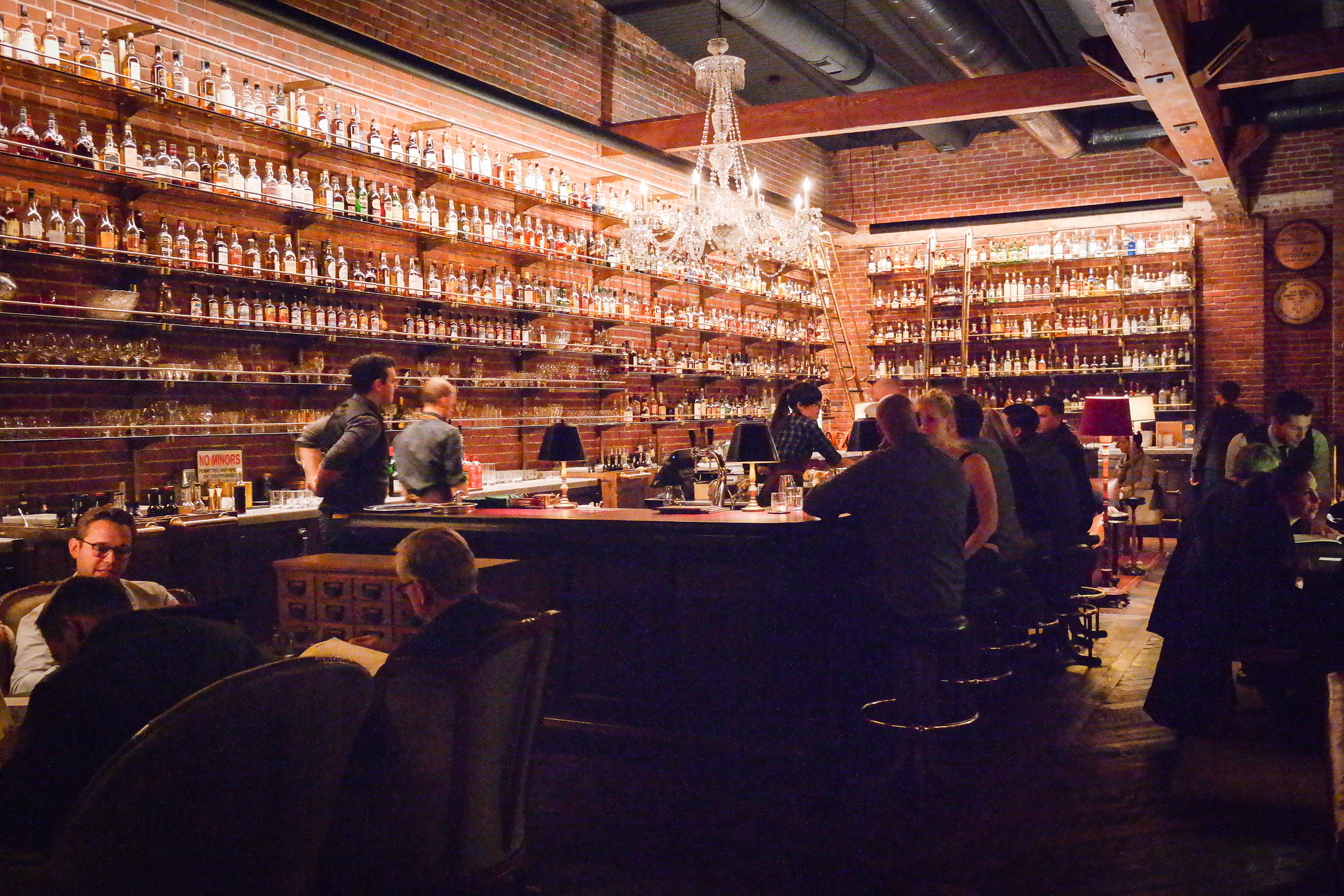
- Interior, 2013
- Interactive map of Multnomah Whiskey Library

Restaurant information
- Location: 1124 SW Alder St, Portland, Multnomah, Oregon, 97205-2201, United States
- Coordinates: 45.52099°N 122.68342°W
- Website: mwlpdx.com

Multnomah Whiskey Library is a drinking parlor and restaurant in Portland, Oregon, United States.

== Reception ==
Multnomah Whiskey Library was a runner-up in the "Best Cocktail Lounge" category of Willamette Week's "Best of Portland Readers' Poll 2020".
