= America's Culinary Cup =

American cooking competition television series

- Genre: Reality competition
- Directed by: Ariel Boles
- Presented by: Padma Lakshmi
- Judges: Padma Lakshmi; Michael Cimarusti; Wylie Dufresne
- Country of origin: United States
- Original language: English
- No. of seasons: 1
- No. of episodes: 11

Production
- Executive producers: Padma Lakshmi; Susan Rosner Rovner; Josh Silberman
- Production companies: Delicious Entertainment; Aha Studios; Raquel Productions

Original release
- Network: CBS
- Release: March 4 – May 13, 2026

America's Culinary Cup is an American reality competition cooking show television series that premiered on CBS on March 4, 2026, and concluded on May 13. The series is hosted and judged by Padma Lakshmi.

== Production ==
On April 17, 2025, it was announced that CBS had ordered the series with Padma Lakshmi as the host, judge, and executive producer. It is a production of former NBCUniversal chairman Susan Rosner Rovner's AHA Studios, making Rovner's return to network television following her departure from NBC in 2023. On November 17, 2025, it was announced that the series would premiere on March 4, 2026. On January 23, 2026, the judges, Michael Cimarusti and Wylie Dufresne, were announced. On January 27, 2026, the chefs were announced.

== Chefs ==
Contestant	Accolade	Hometown/Home country	Result
Rochelle Daniel	Arizona Culinary Hall of Fame	Flagstaff, Arizona	Eliminated March 4
Russell Jackson	James Beard nominee	New York City, New York	Eliminated March 4
Philip Tessier	Bocuse d'Or silver medalist	Napa, California	Eliminated March 4
Sol Han	James Beard nominee	New York City, New York	Eliminated March 4
Kim Alter	James Beard nominee	San Francisco, California	Eliminated March 11
Michael Diaz de Leon	Michelin-starred chef	Denver, Colorado	Eliminated March 18
Malyna Si	Michelin-starred chef	Jackson, Wyoming	Eliminated March 25
Emily Yuen	James Beard nominee	New York City, New York	Eliminated April 1
Diana Dávila	James Beard nominee	Chicago, Illinois	Eliminated April 8
Beverly Kim	Michelin-starred chef	Chicago, Illinois	Eliminated April 15
Keith Corbin	James Beard nominee	Los Angeles, California	Eliminated April 22
Katie Button	James Beard winner	Asheville, North Carolina	Eliminated April 29
Buddha Lo	Michelin-starred chef	New York City, New York	Eliminated May 6
Chris Morgan	Michelin-starred chef	McLean, Virginia	Runners-Up May 13
Matt Peters	Bocuse d'Or gold medalist	Austin, Texas	Runners-Up May 13
Cara Stadler	James Beard nominee	Portland, Maine	Winner May 13

== Elimination table ==
Place	Contestant	Episodes										
Place	Contestant	1	2	3	4	5	6	7	8	9	10	11
1	Cara	WIN	SAFE	SAFE	SAFE	WIN	SAFE	SAFE	SAFE	SAFE	SAFE	WIN
2	Chris	SAFE	SAFE	SAFE	SAFE	SAFE	SAFE	SAFE	SAFE	WIN	SAFE	RUNNER-UP
3	Matt	SAFE	WIN	SAFE	WIN	SAFE	SAFE	SAFE	WIN	SAFE	WIN	RUNNER-UP
4	Buddha	WIN	SAFE	SAFE	SAFE	SAFE	SAFE	WIN	WIN	SAFE	OUT	
5	Katie	WIN	SAFE	SAFE	SAFE	SAFE	SAFE	SAFE	SAFE	OUT		
6	Keith	WIN	SAFE	SAFE	SAFE	WIN	SAFE	SAFE	OUT			
7	Beverly	SAFE	SAFE	WIN	WIN	WIN	WIN	OUT				
8	Diana	WIN	SAFE	SAFE	WIN	SAFE	OUT					
9	Emily	WIN	SAFE	SAFE	SAFE	OUT						
10	Malyna	SAFE	SAFE	SAFE	OUT							
11	Michael	WIN	SAFE	OUT								
12	Kim	WIN	OUT									
13	Sol	OUT										
14	Philip	OUT										
15	Russell	OUT										
16	Rochelle	OUT										

- This cook won the competition.
- This cook finished as a runner-up in the finals.
- This cook won the challenge.
- This cook was safe from elimination.
- This cook won the elimination challenge.
- This cook was eliminated.

== Episodes ==
No.	Title	Guest Judge(s)	Original release date	U.S. viewers (millions)	Rating/share (18-49)
1	"Spoiled for Stroganoff"	N/A	March 4, 2026	N/A	TBA
2	"Meat the First Commandment"	Pat LaFrieda	March 11, 2026	N/A	TBA
3	"Nice Big Squash"	N/A	March 18, 2026	N/A	TBA
4	"Lets Get Saucy"	N/A	March 25, 2026	N/A	TBA
5	"The Roots of Success"	Suzette Gresham, Stefano Secchi, Tim Flores, Genie Kwon, Priya Krishna, JJ Johnson	April 1, 2026	N/A	TBA
6	"Good vs Evil"	Nina Métayer	April 8, 2026	N/A	TBA
7	"The Gastronomic Gauntlet"	N/A	April 15, 2026	N/A	TBA
8	"Consistency Is Key"	N/A	April 22, 2026	N/A	TBA
9	"Passport to Pressure"	Kwame Onwuachi, Roy Choi, Asma Khan	April 29, 2026	N/A	TBA
10	"Bittersweet Semifinals"	N/A	May 6, 2026	N/A	TBA
11	"Million-Dollar Menu"	Eric Ripert, Suzanne Goin, Daniela Soto-Innes	May 13, 2026	N/A	TBA
