= Supper (Spotify) =

Spotify application

Supper is a web-based application on the Spotify digital music streaming platform. The Supper app was born from a group of friends who had backgrounds in the music and gastronomy industries. Digital music solutions company Artisan Council later executed it. The app now sits in the top 40 applications on Spotify.

== About ==
The Supper Spotify application matches recipes for all occasions and skill levels with a playlist for both preparation and presentation, as envisioned by the chefs themselves. Supper is credited with being one of the first apps to pair music with food. Playing on the social nature of music and food culture, users can seamlessly experience both for the first time with real time music streaming.

== Supper.mx ==
In May 2014 Supper was launched outside of the Spotify streaming platform. Though still in partnership with Spotify, supper.mx allows users to view Supper's music + food collaborations on mobile, tablet and desktop, without the need to download Spotify directly.

== Curators ==
All of the recipes and playlists featured on the Supper app come straight from a growing network of tastemakers, including chefs, musicians and institutions around the world. Each month the recipes and playlists are updated in conjunction with current holidays, events and seasons.

=== Launch ===
Launching in October 2013 the first edition of Supper featured content from a range of eating institutions and culture makers from the US and Australia.

- Brooklyn Bowl (Brooklyn)
- Roberta's Pizza (Brooklyn)
- Fancy Hanks (Melbourne)
- The Foresters/Queenies Upstairs (Sydney)
- Hipstamatic
- Panama House (Bondi)
- Sweetwater Inn (Melbourne)
- Soul Clap (Syd record label)
- Yellow Birds (Melbourne)

=== November 2013 ===
- Yardbird (Hong Kong)
- Sonoma Bakery (Sydney)
- Do or Dine (Brooklyn)
- Cameo Gallery (Brooklyn)
- Hypertrak (Blog)
- Blue Smoke (NYC)
- The Crepes of Wrath (Blog)
- Willin Low // Wild Rocket - Wild Oats - Relish

=== December 2013 ===
- The Copper Mill (Sydney)
- Thug Kitchen
- Mamak (Sydney)
- Tutu's (Brooklyn)
- Chin Chin (Melbourne)
- Flat Iron Steak (London)
- Greasy Spoon (Copenhagen)

=== January 2014 ===
- Mexicali Taco & Co. (LA)
- Church & State (LA)
- Salts Cure (LA)
- Nopa (SF)
- L & E Oyster (LA)
- 4100 bar (LA)
- Golden Gopher (LA)
- The Pie Hole (LA)
- State Bird Provisions (SF)

=== Momofuku ===
In February 2014 Supper teamed up with restaurant heavy weights Momofuku. The recipes featured came from their iconic New York, Toronto and Sydney restaurants. Head office also got involved with an instructional from Brand Director Sue Chan on how to paint Momofuku vibes on to any party.

=== SXSW ===
March sees the Supper team migrate to Austin, Texas for SXSW, bringing together the best eateries the city has to offer as well as the music that has influenced them. Restaurants and eateries on board in 2014 included:

- The Backspace
- Kelis
- Swifts Attic
- Uchi
- Jackalope
- Paul Qui/East Side King
- Thai Kun Wonderland
- Hole in the Wall
- Justine's Brasserie
- The Liberty

=== Kelis ===
In April 2014 Kelis presented 5 of her recipes paired with a personal playlist for Supper. Kelis shared her recipes for apple farro, jerk ribs, New York vanilla bean cheesecake and Jerk Ribs. The Kelis/Supper collaboration coincided with the release of Kelis' 2014 album titled 'Food'.

=== Roberta's Pizza ===
In May 2014 Bushwick's Roberta's Pizza was guest curator on the Supper app and website. Included in their selections were restaurants and bars from across New York including Bun-ker Vietnamese, Old Stanley's Bar, St. Anselm, Chuko, Frank's Cocktail Lounge, Junior's Cheesecake, Xi'an Famous Foods, Xe Lua, 124 Old Rabbit and Yuji Ramen.
