= Uchiko =

Uchiko may refer to:

- Uchiko, sushi restaurant in Austin, Texas, United States
- Uchiko, Ehime, town in Kita District, Ehime, Japan
