= Uchi =

Uchi may refer to:

- Uchi (restaurant), a sushi restaurant located in Austin, Texas, United States
- University of Chicago (popularly abbreviated as UChi), a private university in Chicago, Illinois, United States
