= Supper (disambiguation) =

Supper is a name for the main evening meal.

Supper may also refer to:

- Supper (Spotify), a web-based application on Spotify
- Supper (album), a 2003 album by Smog

== See also ==
- Supper club
