= Tyson Cole =

American chef (born 1970)

- Born: September 3, 1970 (age 56); Sarasota, Florida, U.S.
- Education: Apprenticeship
- Culinary career
- Cooking style: Japanese, and fusion
- Current restaurants
- Uchi; Uchiko
- Television show
- Iron Chef America

Tyson Cole (born September 3, 1970) is a chef and restaurateur based in Austin, Texas, USA.

== Biography ==
Cole began his culinary career as a dishwasher at a Japanese restaurant named Kyoto in Downtown Austin, Texas. Attrition among the restaurant's staff gave Cole the opportunity to begin making sushi. Cole worked three and a half years at Kyoto, from 1992 to 1996.

Starting in mid-1996, Cole apprenticed for six and a half years under Takehiko Fuse, owner/chef of Musashino Sushi Dokoro in Austin. Cole also learned Japanese during this stint.

In May 2003, Cole opened Uchi, a 95-seat 2,600 square feet (240 m^{2}) sushi restaurant in Austin.

On July 6, 2010, Cole opened his second restaurant, Uchiko (loosely translated meaning "offspring of Uchi") after a three-week soft opening period. For a time, the executive chef at Uchiko was eventual Top Chef: Texas winner Paul Qui. Cole mentored Qui and was featured in an episode of Top Chef for that reason.

In July 2012, Cole opened his third restaurant, the second location of Uchi in Houston, Texas.

On May 31, 2013, Cole announced the late 2014/early 2015 opening of his fourth restaurant Uchi Dallas. The restaurant opened its doors on June 1, 2015.

In 2018, Cole, together with Aaron Franklin of Franklin Barbecue, founded Loro, a restaurant merging the founders' two loves of Asian and Texas cuisine.

== Awards ==
In 2005, Food & Wine Magazine named Tyson Cole "Best New Chef," one among ten chefs to receive that award.

He led a team of Uchi chefs against Chef Masaharu Morimoto on the Food Network program Iron Chef America in March 2008.

In 2006, Cole won goodhealth.com's "Healthy Chef Showdown" by a hair, over chef David Bull of the Driskill Grill.

In 2009, Tyson Cole was named one of Saveur's "Top 6 Texas Tastemakers."

In 2008, 2009, and 2010, the James Beard Foundation named Cole as a semifinalist in the “Best Chef: Southwest” category of its "James Beard Foundation Award", 2009, 2010.

In 2011, Cole was awarded the James Beard Award for "Best Chef: Southwest.".
