= Lee Ann Kim =

American journalist

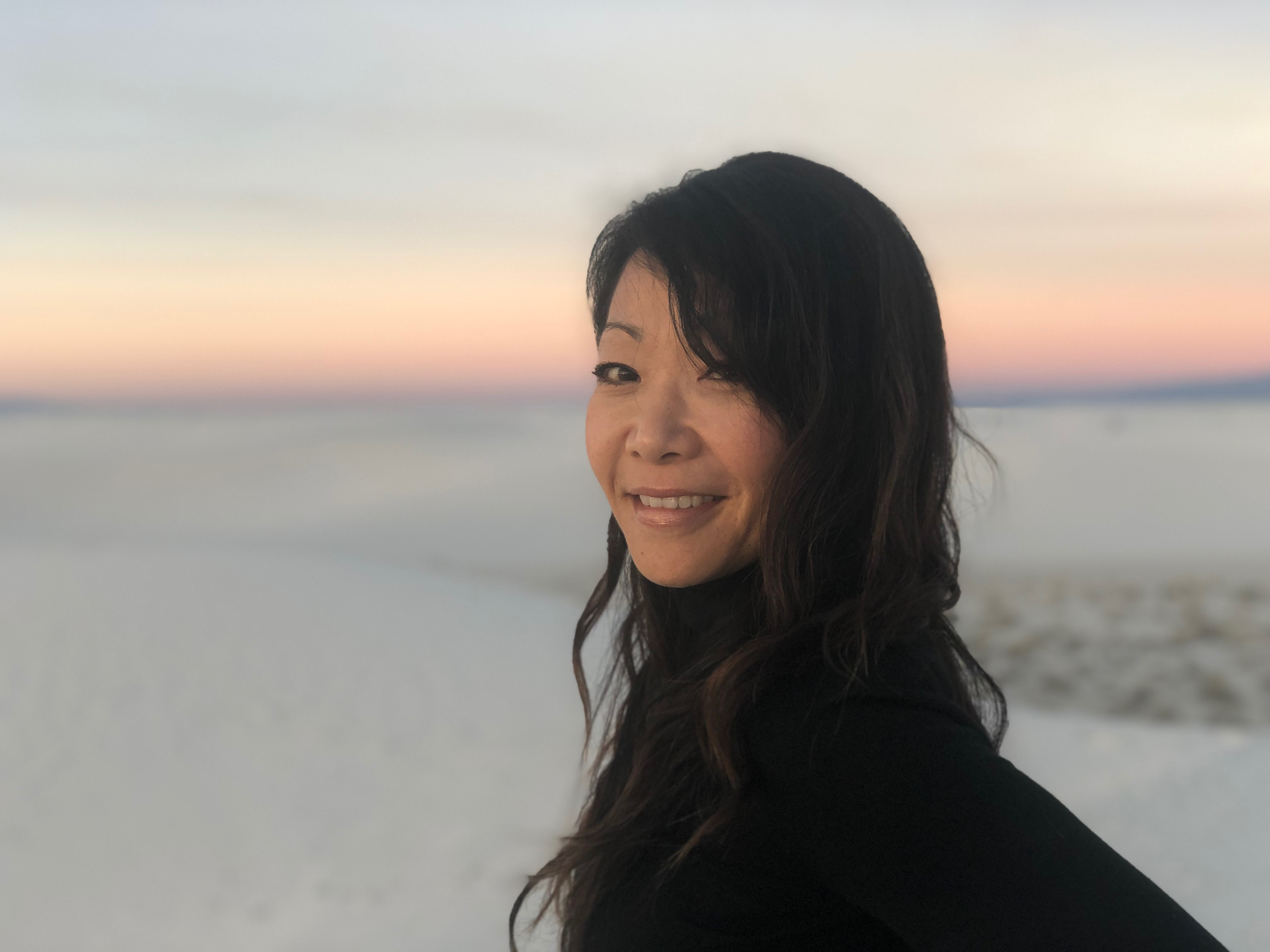
- Lee Ann Kim
- Born: September 1970 (age 55); Seoul, South Korea
- Other name: Lee Ann Yi Yun Kim
- Education: University of Maryland (College Park)
- Years active: 1996–2008
- Spouse: Louis Song
- Children: 2 sons

Lee Ann Kim is a first-generation Korean American who was an anchor and general assignment reporter for KGTV Channel 10, the San Diego, California, ABC television affiliate. She worked at KGTV from 1996 to 2008. She was also the executive director of Pacific Arts Movement (Pac-Arts, formerly the San Diego Asian Film Foundation) until 2016. Pac-Arts presents the annual San Diego Asian Film Festival, an event she founded in 2000 with the Asian American Journalists Association of San Diego. She has been married to Louis Song since 1997, with whom she has two sons.

== Background ==
Lee Ann Kim was born in Seoul, South Korea. She emigrated with her family to Downers Grove, Illinois, near Chicago in 1971, where she spent most of her childhood with her three younger sisters, her mother, and her father, who is a doctor. Her youngest sister Beverly Kim is a chef who made it to the final four of the 2011 season of Top Chef. Kim majored in broadcast journalism with a minor in Spanish at the University of Maryland. She married Louis Song, the CEO of a staffing company, in 1997.

The fact that most adoptees from Asia are not adopted into Asian families makes a clear statement about how Asians negatively view these children and their mothers. We can be the first generation to change that.

— Lee Ann Kim, Interview with Claire Yezbak Fadden (May 2010)

After discussing it for many years, Kim and Song were inspired by a story she watched regarding former National Football League quarterback Dan Marino's own family, prompting the couple to adopt a child while having a birth child of their own. They contacted the Holt International adoption agency and were matched with a boy in March, 2005. However, when the agency was notified that Kim was due to give birth in July 2005, the agency put a stop to the adoption process and reassigned the boy to another family. This was devastating for Kim, who had already named the boy Samuel.

Her birth child, Weston Yongwon Song, was born in 2005.

Lee Ann and Louis Song continued to pursue adoption as soon as her first son was born. On June 16, 2006, they were introduced to 4 month old Samuel Hyungwon Song, her newly adopted son, at Los Angeles International Airport. Samuel was born in February, 2006.

== Professional career ==
=== Broadcast news ===
While a senior at the University of Maryland, she was a bureau reporter for four Washington D.C. area radio stations, covering Maryland state politics in Annapolis for Capitol News Service.

In 1993, she landed her first TV job at the nation's first all-news local broadcast station, KNWS-TV in Houston, Texas. She moved in 1994 to become the main anchor at WCFT, the CBS affiliate station in Tuscaloosa, Alabama. In 1995, she then moved to Springfield, Missouri to work at KYTV, the local NBC affiliate, where she became the first person of color to anchor the news in the Ozarks. In 1996, she accepted an offer from KGTV to work in San Diego, starting in March 1996.

While working for KGTV news, Kim covered Santana and Granite Hills high school shootings, the search for Danielle van Dam, the Heaven's Gate suicides, and the 1996 Republican National Convention.

In 2005, she was promoted to the 5:30 pm weekday anchor position. In 2006, she was named as co-host of the newly created hour-long 4:00 pm news program called 10-4 San Diego, which was later cancelled due to low ratings in August 2006. In August 2008, Lee Ann chose not to accept the station's offer of a lower salary and longer hours and left the news business.

=== San Diego Asian Film Festival ===
Kim started the San Diego Asian Film Festival (SDAFF) in 2000, inspired by a conversation she had overheard while speaking at a local technology company. The first SDAFF was held in August 2000 on the campus of the University of California, San Diego with five features, multiple shorts, and guest appearances from Margaret Cho and Tamlyn Tomita.

I was speaking at a tech company here, and overheard a bunch of Caucasians talking about their favorite Asian movies, how they'd get together, eat dim sum and talk over films. At the same time, I was head of the Asian-American Journalists Association local chapter, and thinking how we could engage a larger audience with our issues. ... Well, I'm not a film connoisseur, but I knew a festival could help create the community we need, give Asians here a way to address their issues and reach others.

— Lee Ann Kim, 2006 interview with David Elliott

In 2002, the organization running the SDAFF applied for nonprofit status as the San Diego Asian Film Foundation. After the scope of the San Diego Asian Film Foundation grew beyond film, the nonprofit was rebranded the Pacific Arts Movement (Pac-Arts) in 2012. Kim served as the executive director the San Diego Asian Film Foundation and Pac-Arts until she retired from the nonprofit in April 2016.

== Awards ==
She has received numerous awards for her work including an Emmy Award for investigative reporting, the California Teacher's Association award for best educational reporting for her coverage of bilingual education, and best news report by the California Chicano News Media Association, and two national Asian American Journalists Association awards for best reporting in Asian and non-Asian related issues.

Since leaving KGTV, Kim has been honored for her nonprofit work including being awarded the 2010 KPBS Hero of the Month award, a 10News Leadership Award, San Diego Magazine′s Top 50 People to Watch in 2009, and she was featured on the cover of San Diego Family Magazine in May 2010. The San Diego Film Critics Society gave her its 2011 Kyle Counts Award, and she was chosen by the Women's Museum of California as the Spirit of the San Diego County Women's Hall of Fame for 2015. The San Diego City Council declared Tuesday, April 19, 2016 "Lee Ann Kim Day" to honor her leadership of Pac-Arts.
