= Acquarello =

Acquarello may refer to:

- Acquarello (painting), watercolour
- Acquarello (wine)

== See also ==
- Acquerello
- Aquarello
- Acquarelle
