= Delicate (Taylor Swift song) =

2018 single by Taylor Swift

- Sawyr and Ryan Tedder Mix cover

Single by Taylor Swift

from the album Reputation
- Released: March 12, 2018
- Studio: MXM (Los Angeles; Stockholm)
- Genre: Electropop; synth-pop
- Length: 3:52
- Label: Big Machine
- Songwriters: Taylor Swift; Max Martin; Shellback
- Producers: Max Martin; Shellback

Taylor Swift singles chronology
"New Year's Day" (2017)	"Delicate" (2018)	"Babe" (2018)

Music video
- "Delicate" on YouTube

"Delicate" is a song by the American singer-songwriter Taylor Swift from her sixth studio album, Reputation (2017). She wrote it with its producers, Max Martin and Shellback. An electropop and synth-pop ballad, "Delicate" features vocoder-manipulated vocals, dense synthesizers, and elements of tropical house and dancehall in its beats. Inspired by the events surrounding Swift's celebrity and personal life, the lyrics depict a narrator's vulnerability and anxiety over whether her blossoming romance would last.

Directed by Joseph Kahn and filmed in Los Angeles, the music video for "Delicate" premiered on March 11, 2018, at the iHeartRadio Music Awards. In the video, after becoming invisible upon receiving a mysterious note, Swift dances barefoot through public places and ultimately becomes visible again after dancing in the pouring rain. Critics interpreted the video as an autobiographical reference to her personal life, particularly her retreat from the press before Reputation's release. A day following the video's release, Big Machine Records sent "Delicate" to radio airplay in the United States as the album's fourth single.

"Delicate" received widespread critical acclaim for its vulnerable songwriting and mellow production. It featured in 2018 year-end lists by Billboard, Slant Magazine, and Rolling Stone, and critics have considered "Delicate" one of Swift's career-defining songs. In the United States, the single peaked at number 12 on the Billboard Hot 100 chart, reached number one on three Billboard airplay charts, and was certified double platinum by the Recording Industry Association of America (RIAA). Elsewhere, it received platinum certifications in Australia, Brazil, New Zealand, Portugal, Spain, and the United Kingdom. Swift performed the song on the Reputation Stadium Tour (2018) and the Eras Tour (2023–2024).

== Background ==
The American singer-songwriter Taylor Swift released her fifth studio album, 1989, in October 2014. 1989's synth-pop production transformed Swift's sound and image from country music to mainstream pop. The album was a commercial success, selling over five million copies in the United States within one year and spawning three Billboard Hot 100 number-one singles. The BBC asserted that the success solidified Swift's status as a global pop star.

Swift was a target of tabloid gossip during the promotion of 1989. Her "America's Sweetheart" reputation, a result of her wholesome and innocent image, was blemished from publicized short-lived relationships and disputes with other celebrities, including a dispute with the rapper Kanye West and the media personality Kim Kardashian. Swift became increasingly reticent on social media, having previously maintained an active presence with a large following, and avoided interactions with the press amidst the tumultuous affairs. She conceived her sixth studio album, Reputation, as an answer to the media commotion surrounding her celebrity.

== Production and composition ==
Swift wrote "Delicate" with its producers, Max Martin and Shellback. It was engineered by Sam Holland and Michael Ilbert at MXM Studios in Stockholm, Sweden, and Los Angeles, California. The song was mixed by Serban Ghenea at MixStar Studios in Virginia Beach, Virginia, and it was mastered by Randy Merrill at Sterling Sound Studios in New York.

"Delicate"
A short sample of the refrain of "Delicate", which features Swift singing over a muted pulse and vocals manipulated by a vocoder

Swift conceived "Delicate" as a confession to a prospective lover and described the song—the fifth track on Reputation—as the album's "first point of vulnerability". The preceding four tracks are about Swift's flippant disinterest in her perceived reputation, which is the recurring theme throughout the album. On "Delicate", she begins to reveal her inner vulnerability. Swift explained the song's meaning during an album release party with iHeartRadio: although she could feign disinterest in others' opinions about her, things became complicated "when you meet somebody that you really want in your life", which prompted her to wonder, "Could something fake like your reputation affect something real, like someone getting to know you?" To create a sound that reflects the lyrics' vulnerable sentiment, Martin and Shellback manipulated Swift's vocals with a vocoder, which Swift thought sounded "really emotional, vulnerable, and ... sad but beautiful". This vocoder effect is recurring on subsequent Reputation tracks.

"Delicate" is a mellow electropop and synth-pop ballad. Its production is driven by pulsing, dense synthesizers. The song features elements of urban music, showcased through influences of house music, tropical house, and dancehall in its beats, and Swift's emphasis on rhythm in her singing-speaking vocal delivery, influenced by hip-hop and Caribbean music. At the beginning of the song, Swift's character tells her lover that, because her reputation has "never been worse", he "must like [her] for [herself]". Carl Wilson from Slate interpreted this part as Swift's revelation on her public image: after the media gossip, she achieved a "liberation" that allowed her to "make her private life her own at last". She shares intimate moments with her love interest at a dive bar "on the East Side". Throughout the song, Swift goes through her inner monolog about whether what she does would affect this blossoming romance and how much her feelings would be reciprocated, over a muted pulse: "Is it cool that I said all that? Is it too soon to do this yet? 'Cause I know that it's delicate." Though she feigns confidence and tries to control her inner self-awareness, she admits: "I pretend you're mine all the damn time." In the refrain, a high-pitched voice echoes the title "Delicate" back to Swift's lyrics.

== Release ==
The music video of "Delicate" premiered at the 2018 iHeartRadio Music Awards on March 11. Following the video's premiere, Big Machine Records and Republic Records released the song to US hot adult contemporary radio stations on March 12, and US contemporary hit radio on March 13, as Reputation's fourth pop radio single. (Note: "Delicate" was Reputation's fourth single released to US pop and adult contemporary radio stations. Another single from Reputation, "New Year's Day", was released to US country radio before "Delicate".) Swift released another music video for the song—shot in a vertical format—exclusively on Spotify for users in the United States, the United Kingdom, Sweden, and Latin America, on March 30, 2018. It was available on YouTube for audiences worldwide on May 15. In Europe, "Delicate" was available for digital download in Germany on March 12, and to Italian and UK radio stations on April 20, 2018.

As part of the Spotify Singles series, Swift recorded a stripped-down version of "Delicate" using acoustic guitars in place of the original version's synthesizers. The version was released alongside Swift's cover of Earth, Wind & Fire's "September" as a two-track extended play (EP) on April 13, 2018, by Spotify. Two official remixes supported "Delicate": one by Sawyr and Ryan Tedder, available on May 25, and the other by Seeb, available on June 8, 2018. In December 2025, in the Dolby Atmos remaster of Reputation on Apple Music, "Delicate" had a lyric change, from "oh damn, never seen that color blue" to "goddamn, never seen that color blue".

== Music video ==
=== Synopsis ===
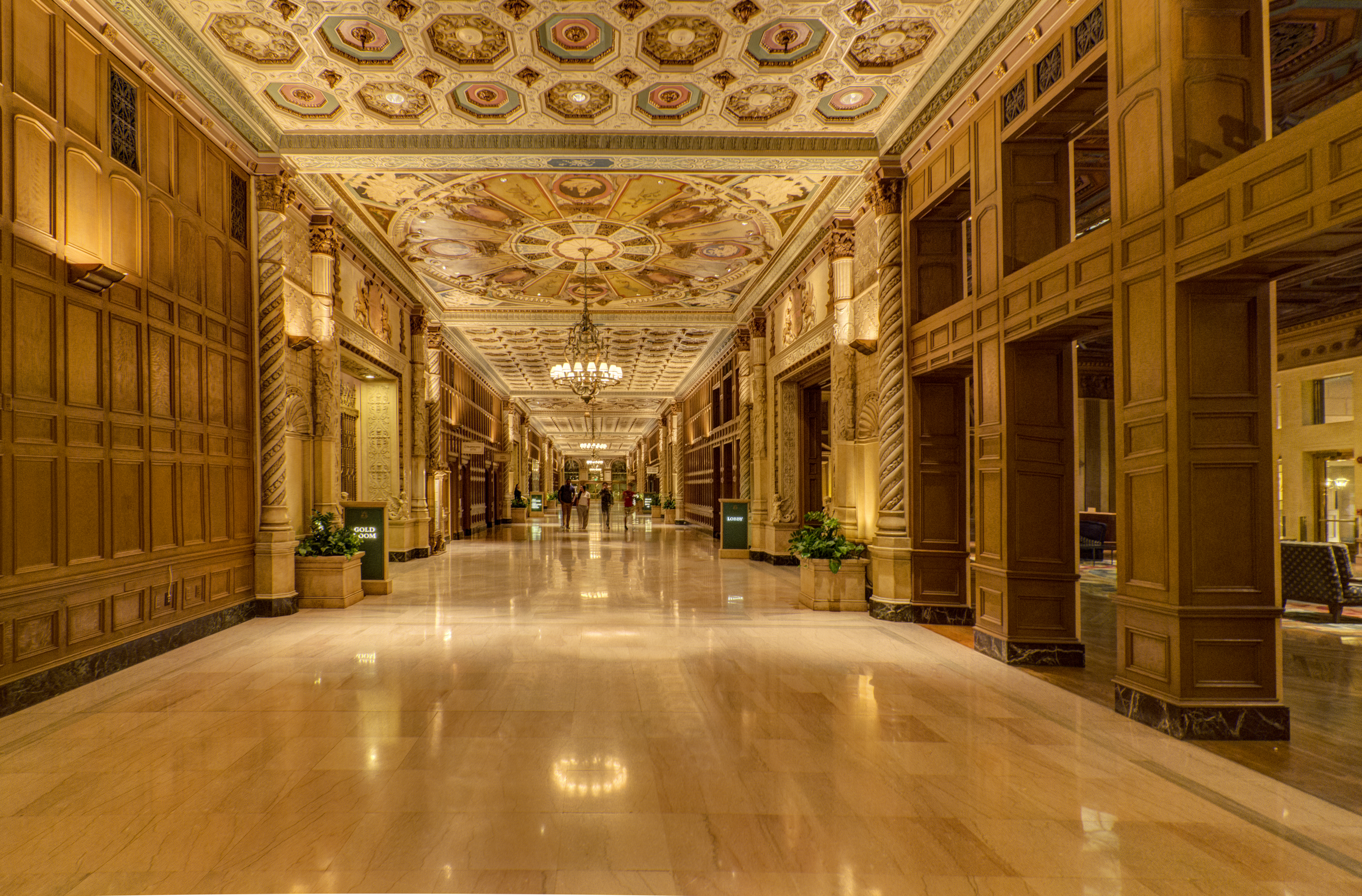
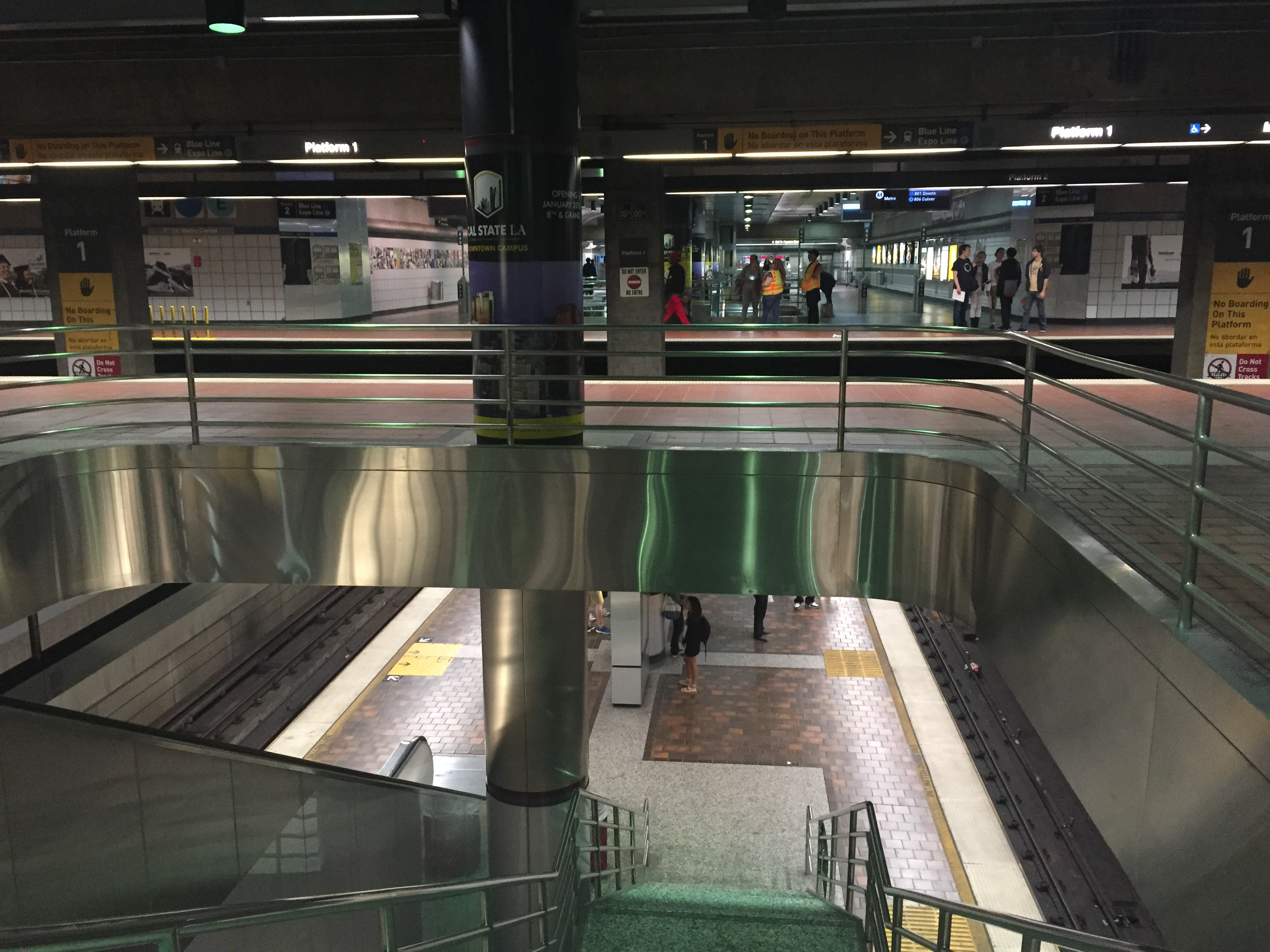
The video was filmed at the Millennium Biltmore Hotel (above) and the 7th Street/Metro Center station (below).

Directed by Joseph Kahn, the music video was shot over two nights in Los Angeles; landmarks featured include the Millennium Biltmore Hotel, the 7th Street/Metro Center station, the Los Angeles Theater, and the Golden Gopher bar. The video opens with Swift on the red carpet, seeming disconnected from the crowd gazing off in the distance. She snaps back to reality as a reporter points a microphone at her face for an interview. Amid camera lights, a mysterious man slips a sparkling paper note into her hand.

After the red-carpet interviews, Swift walks into a hotel lobby surrounded by four bodyguards, one of whom is portrayed by gay pornographic actor Kevin Falk, as the guests turn to look at her. Swift is bothered by the attention toward her, and when she gets some privacy in a dressing room, she turns the note over in her hand and makes silly faces in the mirror before being interrupted by a group of women. When she turns back to the mirror, the note sparkles and she realizes she has become invisible as her reflection in the mirror disappears.

Thrilled by her newfound freedom from fame, Swift starts dancing barefoot through the hotel. Though she seems elated by her invisibility, there are poignant moments—at one scene in an elevator with another woman, Swift thinks that woman is smiling at her, but she is in fact looking at her own reflection in the mirror. Swift continues dancing through a subway platform, and dances in a pouring rain before arriving at a dive bar. As she holds the note, everyone in the bar turns and looks at her, and she is visible again, smiling.

=== Analysis and reception ===
Media outlets considered the video's depiction of Swift's invisibility from the crowd an autobiographical reference, given that she had not given press interviews while promoting Reputation. Writing for The Washington Post, Emily Yahr described the video as a representation of Swift's celebrity. Yahr explained that the scenes where Swift appears jaded from the reporters and bodyguards were parallel to Swift's retreat from the press, and called her invisibility a metaphor for "the only time she's able to be herself". Denise Warner from Billboard wrote that the video's depiction of Swift being "clearly disturbed by her fame" resembled the narrative of Britney Spears's 2000 video "Lucky". In another analysis for Billboard, Richard He wrote: "Swift's a singer and guitarist by trade, but through her dancing and facial expressions, she's learned to tell stories with her whole body." According to He, while the lyrics to "Delicate" were inspired by Swift's love life, the video was inspired by her relationship with her audience. He observed that her cathartic, honest, and rather awkward dancing "for the pure joy of music" reminded her audience of "the reason she began writing songs in the first place". The video won Best Music Video at the 2019 iHeartRadio Music Awards.

Upon the video's release, some commentators on the internet accused "Delicate" of plagiarizing an advertisement directed by Spike Jonze in 2016 for "Kenzo World", a fragrance by the French brand Kenzo. According to Emma Payne, a scholar in music and cinema in the digital era, both visuals depict a woman who "breaks free from the pressures of society and acts freely as though nobody is watching"; to express this sentiment, both feature a choreography made up of unconventional dance moves, such as "marching and stomping" and "animalistic squatting", intertwined with conventional ballet moves. Payne commented that in doing so, the video allows the audience to see the "real" Swift beyond her commercially marketed image. She noted, nonetheless, due to the plagiarism controversy, Swift's persona was scrutinized for being "insincere or fake", a claim that had perpetuated since her earlier "dorky" image.

== Critical reception ==
Music critics lauded Swift's songwriting on "Delicate". Roisin O'Connor of The Independent described the song as an example of Swift's "most honest and direct songwriting". AllMusic's Stephen Thomas Erlewine similarly praised Swift's portrayal of vulnerability as "a necessary exercise" for her to mature as a singer-songwriter. Ann Powers writing for NPR called "Delicate" one of Reputation's "most memorable tracks", and described it as a reminder of Swift's songwriting talents in creating personal and relatable songs about her generation's "fashion choices, modes of gossip, dating habits and dreams of a comfortable middle-class life". To explain this viewpoint, Powers highlighted the lyrics mentioning Swift's love interest in Nike shoes: "In 21st-century America, 'Nikes' is as evocative a word as 'heartache' or 'promise.' Swift understands the heart that beats beneath the brand name."

Other critics highlighted the song's mellower production and vulnerable sentiment, in contrast to Reputation's heavy electronic production and themes about drama and vengeance. Troy Smith from The Plain Dealer called it one of the album's better songs because "Swift keeps the mood light". For Sal Cinquemani from Slant Magazine, the song's blending "scathing self-critique with effervescent pop" offers an enjoyable moment that contrasts with the album's dominant "tired, repetitive EDM tricks". Clash's Shahzaib Hussain criticized Reputation as a pretentious album with excessive lyrics about fame, but praised "Delicate" as one of the tracks that offer emotional honesty. On a less enthusiastic side, Spin's Jordan Sargent wrote that even though the song is one of Reputation's most honest, it is still "unshackled" from the album's recurring themes of drama and vengeance. Sargent, however, said that the production contains an "ethereal lusciousness" that hints at "new paths for her to travel".

Music critics have retrospectively considered "Delicate" one of Swift's strongest songs. Exclaim!'s Alex Hudson and Megan LaPierre, Paste's Jane Song, NME's Hannah Mylrae, and Rolling Stone's Rob Sheffield all lauded the song's depiction of vulnerability in terms of both lyrics and music, specifically through the vocoder effects. Sheffield ranked it first in his list of the best songs of 2017 and placed it at number four on his 2025 ranking of all 274 songs in Swift's discography. The song featured on 2018 year-end lists by Slant Magazine (9th), Rolling Stone (12th), and Billboard (35th). "Delicate" was one of the award-winning songs at the BMI Pop Awards (2019), and the ASCAP Awards (2019 and 2020).

== Commercial performance ==
"Delicate" was a sleeper hit in the United States. It entered at number 84 on the Billboard Hot 100 in March 2018 and reached the top 40 in May, becoming Swift's 56th song to enter the top-40 region and extending her status as the woman with the most top-40 entries. In July, in its sixteenth charting week, "Delicate" entered the top 20, driven by strong airplay performance. It was the second single from Reputation to enter the top 10 of Billboard's Radio Songs chart (peaking at number two), after the lead single "Look What You Made Me Do". "Delicate" peaked atop the Pop Songs chart and was Reputation's first number-one single on the Adult Pop Songs and Adult Contemporary charts, becoming the album's most successful radio single.

"Delicate" peaked at number 12 and spent 35 weeks on the Billboard Hot 100, becoming the longest-charting single from Reputation. The single was one of the 10 most successful songs on United States airplay of 2018, culminating 2.509 billion radio audience impressions. (Note: Audience impressions refer to the number of audience reached by a song on airplay from a radio station.) iHeartRadio awarded the single a Titanium Award for amassing one billion spins throughout 2018. It was certified by the Recording Industry Association of America, which denotes two million units consisted of sales and on-demand streaming. Philip Cosores from Uproxx thought that the success of "Delicate" changed the narrative that Reputation was an underwhelming era for Swift, an idea corroborated by Andrew Unterberger from Billboard, who described its sleeper success as a "turnaround in momentum". For Unterberger, the single's vulnerable sentiment and production contrasted with the previous singles' "outwardly vindictive" sentiments and proved that "[the audience] too still like Taylor for Taylor".

"Delicate" peaked within the top 20 on singles charts of Iceland (3), Honduras (11), Malaysia (14), the Czech Republic (19), and Canada (20). It was a top-40 chart entry in Greece, Hungary, Ireland, New Zealand, Norway (where it was certified gold), and Australia (where it was certified six-times platinum). The single was certified double platinum in Brazil, and platinum in Portugal, and the United Kingdom, where it charted outside the top 40.

== Live performances and covers ==
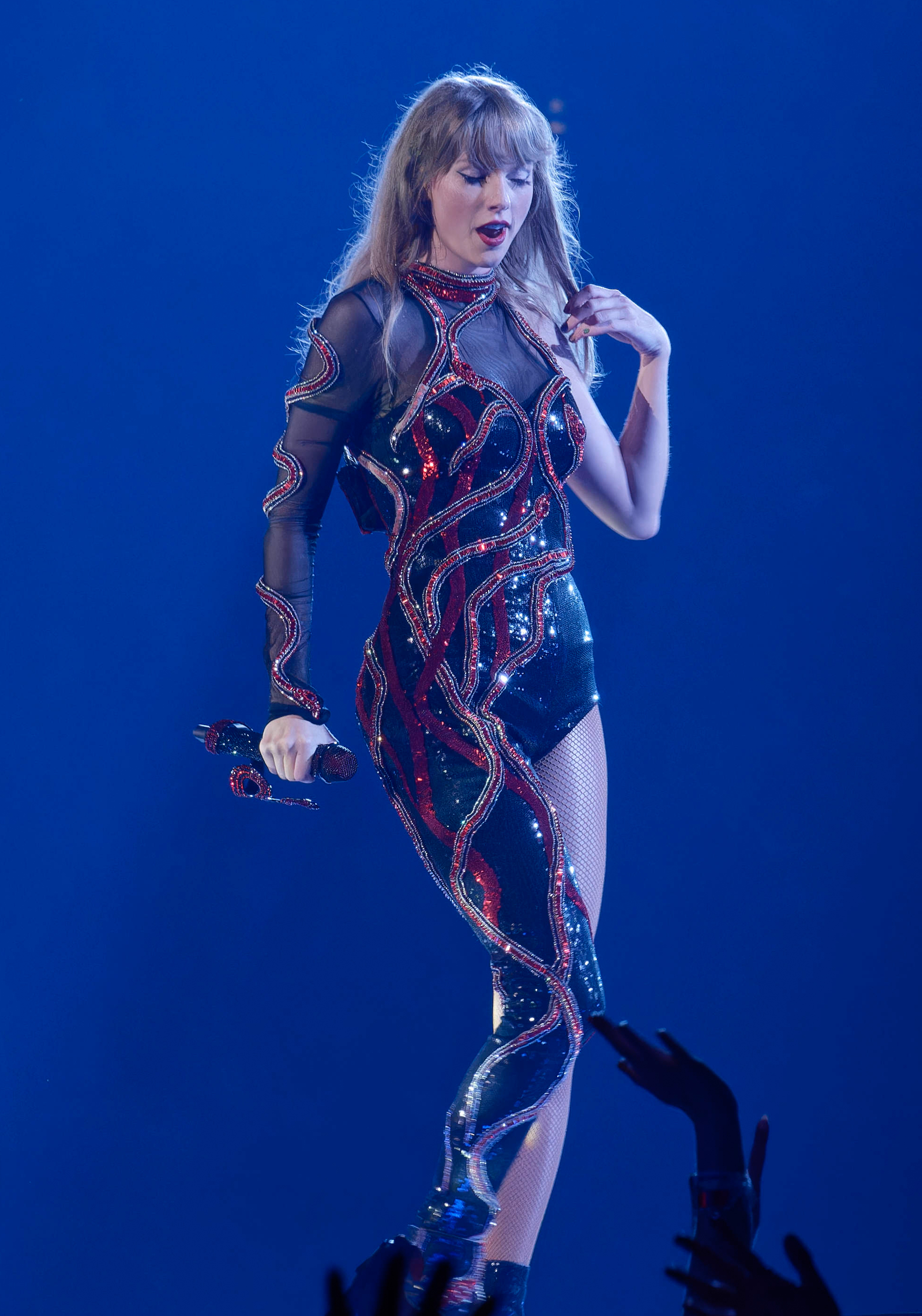
Swift performing "Delicate" on the Eras Tour (2023)

Swift included "Delicate" on the set list of her Reputation Stadium Tour (2018). During the concerts, she performed the song while standing in a golden balloon basket that floated above across the crowd. Swift performed an acoustic version of the song on a guitar at BBC Radio 1's Biggest Weekend on May 27, 2018, in Swansea. On December 6, 2018, Swift made an unannounced appearance at the Ally Coalition Talent Show, a benefit concert organized by the producer Jack Antonoff in New York, where she performed an acoustic rendition of "Delicate" with Hayley Kiyoko.

On April 23, 2019, Swift performed an acoustic version of the song at the Lincoln Center for the Performing Arts during the Time 100 Gala, where she was honored as one of the "100 most influential people" of the year. During promotion of her seventh studio album Lover in 2019, Swift performed the song at the Wango Tango festival on June 1, at the Amazon Prime Day concert on July 10, and at the City of Lover one-off concert in Paris on September 9. "Delicate" was included on the set list of Swift's sixth headlining concert tour, the Eras Tour (2023–2024).

On May 23, 2018, the British singer-songwriter James Bay covered "Delicate" as part of his BBC Radio 1's Live Lounge. The American singer Kelly Clarkson performed the song in an episode of her daytime talk show, The Kelly Clarkson Show, which aired on November 4, 2019.

== Personnel ==
Credits are adapted from the liner notes of Reputation.

- Taylor Swift – vocals, songwriter
- Max Martin – producer, songwriter, programming, keyboards
- Shellback – producer, songwriter, programming, keyboards
- Sam Holland – engineer
- Michael Ilbert – engineer
- Cory Bice – assistant engineer
- Jeremy Lertola – assistant engineer
- Serban Ghenea – mixing
- John Hanes – mix engineer
- Randy Merrill – mastering

== Charts ==
=== Weekly charts ===
2018–2019 weekly chart performance
Chart (2018–2019)	Peak position
Australia (ARIA)	28
Austria (Ö3 Austria Top 40)	70
Belgium (Ultratip Bubbling Under Flanders)	4
Belgium (Ultratip Bubbling Under Wallonia)	4
Canada Hot 100 (Billboard)	20
Canada AC (Billboard)	3
Canada CHR/Top 40 (Billboard)	6
Canada Hot AC (Billboard)	2
Czech Republic Airplay (ČNS IFPI)	19
Czech Republic Singles Digital (ČNS IFPI)	31
Finland Airplay (Radiosoittolista)	46
France (SNEP)	169
Greece International (IFPI)	25
Honduras (Monitor Latino)	11
Hungary (Stream Top 40)	32
Iceland (RÚV)	3
Ireland (IRMA)	31
Malaysia (RIM)	14
Mexico Ingles Airplay (Billboard)	10
New Zealand (Recorded Music NZ)	33
Norway (VG-lista)	27
Poland Airplay (ZPAV)	42
Portugal (AFP)	56
Scottish Singles Sales (Official Charts)	51
Slovakia Airplay (ČNS IFPI)	61
Slovakia Singles Digital (ČNS IFPI)	44
Sweden (Sverigetopplistan)	98
Switzerland (Schweizer Hitparade)	88
UK Singles (Official Charts)	45
US Billboard Hot 100	12
US Adult Contemporary (Billboard)	1
US Adult Pop Airplay (Billboard)	1
US Dance Airplay (Billboard)	4
US Pop Airplay (Billboard)	1
Venezuela (National-Report)	69

2024 weekly chart performance
Chart (2024)	Peak position
Singapore (RIAS)	19

=== Year-end charts ===
2018 year-end charts
Chart (2018)	Position
Canada (Canadian Hot 100)	36
Iceland (Plötutíóindi)	60
Portugal (AFP)	174
US Billboard Hot 100	24
US Adult Contemporary (Billboard)	9
US Adult Pop Songs (Billboard)	2
US Dance/Mix Show Airplay (Billboard)	45
US Pop Songs (Billboard)	18

2019 year-end charts
Chart (2019)	Position
US Adult Contemporary (Billboard)	6

== Certifications ==
Certifications
Region	Certification	Certified units/sales
Australia (ARIA)	6× Platinum	420,000^{‡}
Brazil (Pro-Música Brasil)	3× Platinum	120,000^{‡}
Denmark (IFPI Danmark)	Platinum	90,000^{‡}
France (SNEP)	Gold	100,000^{‡}
Italy (FIMI)	Gold	50,000^{‡}
New Zealand (RMNZ)	3× Platinum	90,000^{‡}
Norway (IFPI Norway)	Gold	30,000^{‡}
Poland (ZPAV)	Gold	25,000^{‡}
Portugal (AFP)	Platinum	10,000^{‡}
Spain (Promusicae)	Platinum	60,000^{‡}
United Kingdom (BPI)	Platinum	600,000^{‡}
United States (RIAA)	2× Platinum	2,000,000^{‡}
^{‡} Sales+streaming figures based on certification alone.

== Release history ==
Release dates and formats
Region	Date	Format(s)	Version	Label(s)	Ref.
Germany	March 12, 2018	Digital download	Original	Universal	
United States	March 12, 2018	Hot adult contemporary radio	Original	Big Machine; Republic	
United States	March 13, 2018	Contemporary hit radio	Original	Big Machine; Republic	
Italy	April 20, 2018	Radio airplay	Original	Universal	
Various	May 25, 2018	Digital download; streaming	Sawyr and Ryan Tedder remix	Big Machine	
Various	June 8, 2018	Digital download; streaming	Seeb remix	Big Machine	

== See also ==
- List of Billboard Adult Top 40 number-one songs of the 2010s
- List of Billboard Adult Contemporary number-one songs of 2018
- List of Billboard Mainstream Top 40 number-one songs of 2018
- Billboard Year-End Hot 100 singles of 2018
