= Beverly Kim =

American chef

- Education: Kendall College
- Culinary career
- Current restaurants
- Parachute HiFi; Anelya
- Previous restaurants
- Parachute; Wherewithall; The Dining Room at the Ritz-Carlton; Red Light; Charlie Trotter's; Prairie Grass Cafe; Opera; Aria (Fairmont Hotel)
- Television shows
- Top Chef (season 9); America's Culinary Cup
- Awards
- 2019 James Beard Foundation Award, Best Chef: Great Lakes

Beverly Kim is a James Beard Award–winning chef and restaurateur who was a contestant on Top Chef in 2011. She co-owned the Michelin-starred modern Korean restaurant Parachute with her husband Johnny Clark in Chicago from 2014 to 2024 before transforming that space into Parachute HiFi. In 2019, Kim and Clark opened neighboring restaurant Wherewithall, which closed in 2023 to make way for Anelya. She competed on America's Culinary Cup in 2026.

== Early life ==
Kim grew up in Downers Grove, Illinois, the daughter of Korean immigrants. She became interested in becoming a chef in high school, writing to Chicago-area chefs and landing an internship with Sarah Stegner at The Ritz-Carlton, Chicago before attending Kendall College, graduating in 2000.

== Culinary career ==
After culinary school, Kim worked again at the Ritz, and then at Charlie Trotter's. She worked with Stegner at Prairie Grass Cafe and then became executive chef of Opera and then Aria in the Fairmont Hotel in Chicago.

In 2011, Kim competed on season 9 of Top Chef in Texas. She was on the winning team in the "Restaurant Wars" episode before being eliminated in a later episode. However, she returned by winning the "Last Chance Kitchen" competition, and ended up finishing in fourth place.

In 2012, she was hired to take over the Michelin-starred Bonsoirée in Chicago, but the restaurant closed after two months. She then returned to her alma mater to teach a fine dining course at Kendall College's School of Culinary Arts.

In 2014, Kim and her husband, Johnny Clark, opened their own restaurant, Parachute in Avondale, Chicago, serving modern Korean-American cuisine. The restaurant was named Eater Chicago's 2014 Restaurant of the Year, and it was a finalist for the 2015 James Beard Award for Best New Restaurant. Bon Appétit magazine named it one of the country's best new restaurants in 2015. Parachute received a Michelin star in the 2016 Michelin Guide for Chicago. In 2019, Kim and Clark won the James Beard Award for Best Chef, Great Lakes. Parachute closed in March 2024, and Parachute HiFi, a casual pub, re-opened in the same space in October 2024.

In July 2019, Kim and Clark opened Wherewithall, a contemporary American restaurant. In June 2023, they closed Wherewithall, citing COVID-19 related difficulties as well as plumbing issues as main drivers behind the closure. In October 2023, a new concept, Anelya, opened in the former space that Wherewithall occupied, serving Ukrainian food inspired by Clark's Ukrainian heritage.

In 2026, Kim competed on America's Culinary Cup, which features a US$1,000,000 prize. Among the final eight contestants, her peers voted her most likely to win the competition, but she was eliminated on the molecular gastronomy challenge the following week.

== Personal life ==
Kim and her husband live in Chicago with their two children. Journalist Lee Ann Kim is her sister.
