= Bonsoirée =

Defunct restaurant in Chicago, Illinois, U.S.

- Interactive map of Bonsoirée

Restaurant information
- Established: September 2006
- Closed: October 2012
- Previous owner: Shin Thompson
- Chef: Shin Thompson; Beverly Kim and Johnny Clark (2012)
- Food type: French and Japanese-influenced contemporary cuisine
- Rating: (Michelin Guide, 2011–2012)
- Location: 2728 West Armitage Avenue, Chicago, Illinois, 60647, United States
- Coordinates: 41°55′3.5″N 87°41′45.5″W

Bonsoirée was a fine dining restaurant in the Logan Square neighborhood of Chicago, Illinois. Chef and owner Shin Thompson opened it in September 2006 as a small gourmet-to-go café, then developed it into a BYOB restaurant centered on seasonal tasting menus and French cuisine with Japanese influences. Bonsoirée received one Michelin star in the guide's inaugural 2011 Chicago edition and retained it for 2012. It closed in October 2012.

== History ==
Thompson opened Bonsoirée Café and Delicacies with business partner Kurt Chenier in September 2006. The 26-seat operation initially sold sandwiches and prepared food and ran a catering business; dinner service began as a side project in the storefront and expanded as demand increased. The restaurant also held reservation-only Saturday "Underground" dinners, a format that grew from meals Thompson and his colleagues had prepared for friends and family.

By 2008, Bonsoirée was operating as a French BYOB restaurant with frequently changing five- and seven-course tasting menus. Thompson's cooking combined French techniques with Japanese presentation and ingredients. In October 2010, he and Bonsoirée chef Luke Creagan prepared a five-course dinner at the James Beard Foundation's James Beard House, Thompson's second appearance there.

Michelin included Bonsoirée among the 18 restaurants awarded one star in the inaugural 2011 Chicago guide. That year, it completed an enclosed patio with a retractable roof that was intended to add approximately 20 seats to the 28-seat dining room. The restaurant was then serving eight- and thirteen-course menus and offered nonalcoholic beverage pairings while remaining BYOB.

In July 2012, Thompson announced that he would step away from day-to-day operations while remaining majority owner. Chefs Beverly Kim and her husband, Johnny Clark, joined the restaurant to take over its kitchen. After a two-week closure for remodeling, Bonsoirée reopened on August 24 with a 12-course menu emphasizing Korean and contemporary preparations, a prepaid reservation system, and a beverage program that replaced its BYOB policy.

Kim and Clark mutually agreed to leave the partnership in early October. The restaurant announced that it would stop service on October 13 for a possible reconcept, but the closure became permanent. Table, Donkey and Stick subsequently opened in the space. In 2013, Thompson revived the Bonsoirée name for occasional private dinners in customers' homes.

== See also ==
- List of defunct restaurants of the United States
- List of Michelin-starred restaurants in Chicago
