= Katie Button =

American chef and restaurateur (born 1983)

Katie Button (born 1983) is an American Chef and restaurateur. She holds the title of Executive Chef and CEO of the restaurant group Katie Button Restaurants which includes Cúrate Bar de Tapas and La Bodega by Cúrate located in Asheville, North Carolina.. She also operates an online Spanish food market, Cúrate at Home, and a culinary travel company, Cúrate Trips.

== Career ==
Button was born in South Carolina, and raised in New Jersey. Button attended Cornell University, and obtained a master's degree in biomedical engineering at École Centrale Paris. She began her career in hospitality as a server at José Andrés’ Café Atlantico and Minibar in Washington, DC. She then accompanied her now husband, Félix Meana to work as a server at El Bulli, where she fell in love with the food world, and made the move into the kitchen. She spent a year gathering experience under industry names such as José Andrés and Jean-Georges Vongerichten, and returned to El Bulli the next season with a seven-month stage in pastry. Button & Meana moved to Asheville and created Cúrate Bar de Tapas with her parents in 2011. The Spanish tapas restaurant received numerous awards and accolades, from mentions in The Wall Street Journal and The New York Times to local awards and press. Katie Button and team went on to open Button & Co. Bagels downtown Asheville in 2018. In the wake of the COVID-19 pandemic, the Katie Button Restaurants team chose to pivot their business model, expanding the Cúrate brand into the former Button & Co. Bagels space with their newest concept, La Bodega by Cúrate.

A four-time James Beard Award nominee, Button was a semifinalist for the James Beard Rising Star Chef award in 2012 & 2013, a nominee in 2014, semi-finalist for Best Chefs in America in 2015 and a nominee for Best Chef Southeast 2018, 2019 and 2020. Chef Button was one of Food & Wine magazine's Best New Chefs of 2015 and hosted an international television series, The Best Chefs in the World. In 2018, Cúrate was named one of the “40 Most Important Restaurants of the Decade” by Esquire, and recognized as one of the nation's “100 Best Wine Restaurants” by Wine Enthusiast.

Button was selected as the host of the National Geographic Channel series The World's Best Chefs. She has also been a guest star on FYI Network's Scraps and a guest chef on CBS This Morning Saturday's The Dish.

Katie Button has attended the James Beard Foundation Boot Camp for Policy and Change, an educational program with Chefs Action Network for chefs from across the country. She is also serving on the Independent Restaurant Coalition's leadership team.

Button published her first cookbook in October 2016. The book, Cúrate: Authentic Spanish Food from an American Kitchen, celebrates the broad appeal of Spanish cooking and shows readers how to recreate and adapt classic dishes in the home kitchen using seasonal local ingredients.

== Personal life ==
Button is married to Félix Meana. They have two children.

== Awards and nominations ==
- Semi-finalist for James Beard Rising Star Chef award from 2012 to 2013
- James Beard finalist for Rising Star Chef award, 2014
- Food & Wine magazine’s Best New Chefs of 2015
- Semi-finalist for James Beard Best Chefs in America, 2015
- James Beard nominee for Best Chefs in America, 2018 and 2019, 2020

== Bibliography ==
- Button, Katie; Ko, Genevieve (2016). Cúrate: Authentic Spanish Food from an American Kitchen. Macmillan. ISBN 9781250059444. OCLC 953926834.
