= Acquerello =

Italian restaurant in San Francisco, California, U.S.

- Interactive map of Acquerello

Restaurant information
- Established: July 1989
- Owners: Suzette Gresham, Giancarlo Paterlini
- Head chef: Suzette Gresham
- Chef: Gonzalo Agliozzo
- Pastry chef: Theron Marss
- Food type: Italian
- Dress code: Jackets required
- Rating: (Michelin Guide)
- Location: 1722 Sacramento Street, San Francisco, California, 94109, United States
- Coordinates: 37°47′29.7″N 122°25′17.3″W
- Seating capacity: 50
- Reservations: Recommended
- Website: www.acquerellosf.com

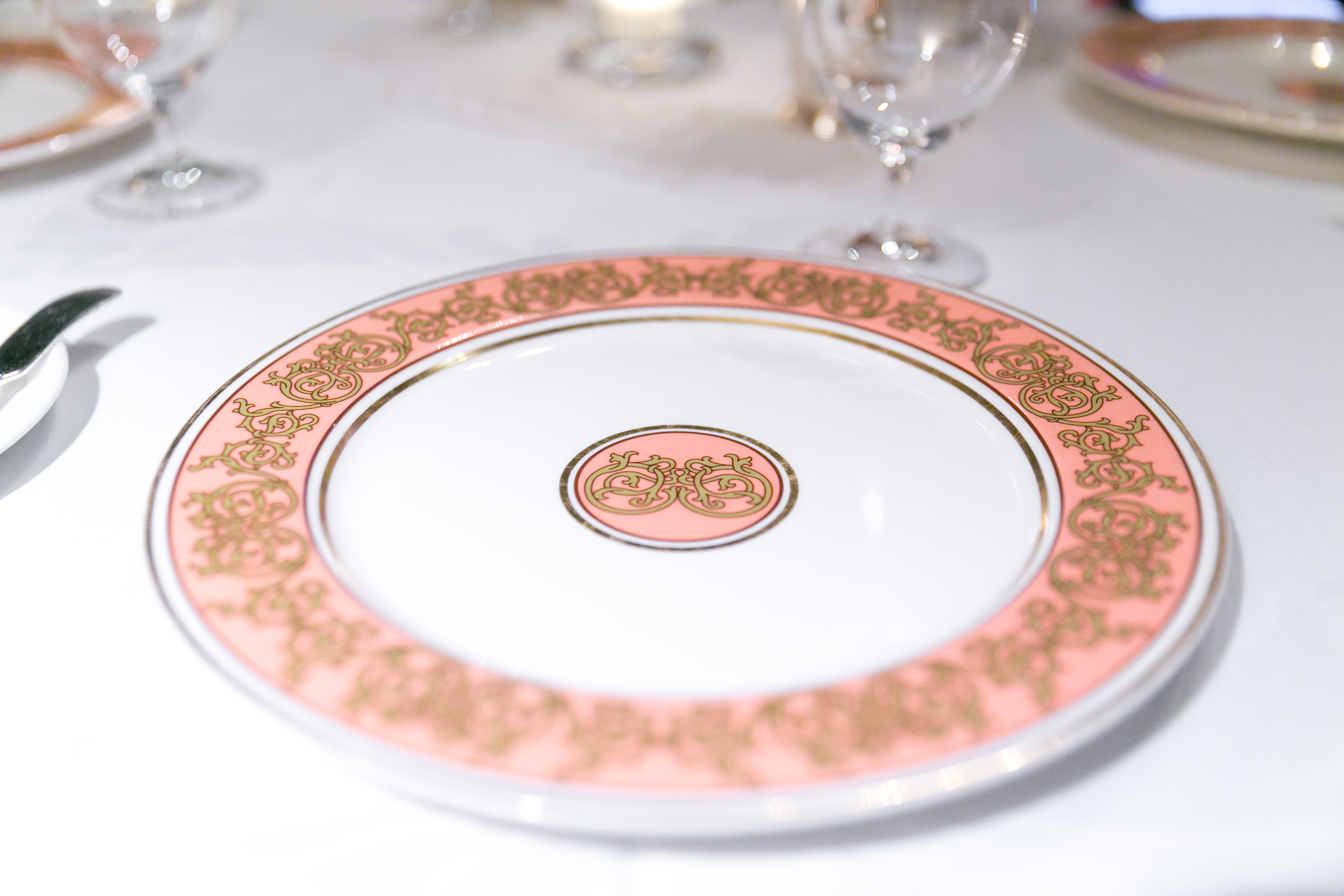
Table setting at Acquerello

Acquerello is an Italian restaurant in Nob Hill, San Francisco, California, United States, with two Michelin stars. It is co-owned by Giancarlo Paterlini and executive chef Suzette Gresham, who founded it in 1989.

== History ==
Executive chef Suzette Gresham and general manager Giancarlo Paterlini left another high-end Italian restaurant, Donatello, to open Acquerello in July 1989. Gresham has remained the executive chef, with chef de cuisine Mark Pensa, followed as of 2026 by Gonzalo Agliozzo. Paterlini is the front of house manager; his son Gianpaolo Paterlini has succeeded him as wine director.

The initial selection of 70 wines was based on four cases of Italian wine acquired in trade for a case of 1983 Mouton Rothschild. This was expanded to 600 selections and under Gianpaolo Paterlini to 2,000. The restaurant took over the location of Zola's, a French restaurant, with 14 tables, a very small kitchen, and the wine collection housed in the foyer; in late 1997 the restaurant was enlarged by moving the kitchen into an adjacent space. The dining room was redecorated in 2011 by interior designer John Wheatman.

== Restaurant ==
Acquerello is housed in a converted chapel in the Polk Gulch section of Nob Hill. The dining room, which has stucco walls and a high open-beam ceiling, is decorated with watercolors of Italy; acquerello is the Italian word for watercolor.

Acquerello serves a seasonal menu of Italian food, either traditional dishes à la carte or a tasting menu of modern Italian cuisine with wine pairings. It is among the few San Francisco restaurants that still have a dress code, requiring jackets for men and "the equivalent for ladies".

The restaurant has an extensive wine list, primarily of Italian wines but also including rare and high-end California wines, with the cellar containing about 15,000 bottles as of December 2024. It has one of the most extensive offerings of Italian wine in the United States.

== Reception ==
Acquerello was awarded a Michelin star in the first Michelin Guide to the San Francisco Bay Area, in 2007, and a second star in the 2015 Guide; Gresham was the third female chef to achieve two Michelin stars in the United States. It has retained the two stars. Acquerello has held Wine Spectator's Grand Award since 2012. In 2025, Gresham was a semifinalist for the James Beard Foundation Outstanding Chef award.

Acquerello has been called one of the best Italian restaurants in the United States. The Michelin Guide describes the cooking as "top rate, promising finesse and bold flavors in equal measure", and highlights the dessert offerings, with "one of the best mignardises carts in town". In the San Francisco Chronicle, long-term restaurant critic Michael Bauer noted in 2018 that the tasting menu at Acquerello was the only Italian tasting menu in San Francisco, and called the prix fixe menu "one of the best bargains" in the city given the quality of the food. He included Acquerello in his lists of the 100 best San Francisco Bay Area restaurants. It was also included in the 2019 list by his successor, Soleil Ho, and is on the Chronicle's 2025 list of the best Italian restaurants, but it was not included in the 2025 or 2026 Top 100 lists.

Bauer repeatedly praised Acquerello for its service, and it is on the Chronicle's 2025 list of restaurants with the best service. It has also been recognized for its cleanliness, by both the San Francisco Health Department and the SFGate news website.

== Associated ventures ==
In 2013 the owners of Acquerello opened a sister casual restaurant, 1760, at 1760 Polk Street, one block from Acquerello; it served an international menu. In 2021, Sorella, described as a cicchetti bar, replaced 1760 at the same address.

== See also ==
- List of Italian restaurants
- List of Michelin-starred restaurants in California
