= Paul Qui =

American chef (born 1980)

- Born: August 14, 1980 (age 46); Maria ConsueloPhilippines
- Education: Le Cordon Bleu (Austin, TX)
- Occupation: Chef
- Known for: Winner of Top Chef: Texas

Paul Qui (born August 14, 1980) is a Texas-based Top Chef winner and James Beard award recipient. He operates restaurants East Side King (Austin), Thai Kun (Austin) and Pao (Miami).

In 2011, he won the ninth season of reality television cooking competition Top Chef. Qui is also a winner of the James Beard Award.

== Biography ==
Paul Qui was born in the Philippines and moved to the United States as a child. He attended high school in Springfield, Virginia and completed his culinary training at Le Cordon Bleu in Austin, Texas. His initial forays into cooking professionally led to a job with Tyson Cole, chef/owner of Uchi and Uchiko restaurants in Austin. During his time in the kitchen, Cole became Qui's mentor, and Qui eventually worked his way up to become the chef de cuisine and executive chef at Uchiko.

Qui was one of 29 contestants who appeared on Top Chef Season 9 in 2011, which was filmed in locations around Texas. He won eight of the season's 16 elimination challenges and went on to win the entire season. Tom Colicchio, the head judge of Top Chef, said that Qui was the most talented chef in the first 12 seasons of the show.

Following his win, he returned to Austin and opened his flagship restaurant, Qui, and a venture called East Side King, which showcases various Japanese-inspired dishes via food trucks with business partner Moto Utsunomiya. Another of Qui's restaurants, Thai Kun, was recognized by Bon Appétit magazine as one of the best restaurants in America in 2014. In 2016, Qui opened Pao by Paul Qui at Faena Hotel in Miami Beach, Florida. That same year he was charged with assaulting his then-girlfriend with her minor child present while intoxicated and announced he was entering treatment; the charges were dropped in 2018 after his former girlfriend stopped cooperating with the investigation.

In 2018, his new Houston restaurant Aqui received a rare four-star review from the Houston Chronicle, but closed at the end of the year amidst controversy over the domestic violence charges.

In March 2019, Qui announced the opening of a second East Side King location in Denver, Colorado, inside the food hall Avanti Food & Beverage. However, a day later, it was announced that Avanti backed out of the deal. During this period, Qui expanded his restaurant portfolio by opening an additional East Side King location at POST Houston, a large-scale food hall development in downtown Houston. Around the same time, he launched two new dining concepts in Austin: Oko and Top Roe. While Top Roe later closed, Oko has remained in operation and continues to serve guests. Following the closure of East Side King locations in both Houston and Austin, Qui repurposed the former Austin space and, in December 2025, opened Kitsu Nori, a Japanese hand roll bar concept offering sushi, crudo, and highball cocktails. The restaurant occupies the same building and represents a new standalone dining experience.

== Awards and accolades ==
In addition to his win on Top Chef, Paul Qui also has earned the following awards:

- Chef of the Year by Esquire Magazine in 2014
- Best Chef, Southwest by the James Beard Foundation in 2012
- One of Food & Wine magazine's best new chefs of 2014
- Winner of the 2013 S. Pellegrino Cooking Cup Young Chef of the Year
