= Suzette Gresham =

American chef

- Culinary career
- Cooking style: Italian cuisine
- Rating: Michelin stars
- Current restaurants: Acquerello, San Francisco (1989–present), Sorella, San Francisco (2021–present)
- Previous restaurants: The Donatello, San Francisco (1988–1989), 1760, San Francisco (2013–2020)

Suzette Gresham, also known as Suzette Gresham-Tognetti, is an American chef. She holds two Michelin stars at her restaurant Acquerello in San Francisco, California.

== Career ==
Suzette Gresham was hired to work as head chef at The Donatello, a hotel in San Francisco, California, by front of house manager Giancarlo Paterlini in 1988. This was the first head chef position for Gresham, who had previously worked for United Airlines. The hiring caused some surprise on her first day at the hotel, as the kitchen staff presumed that since she was female, that she was in fact the pastry chef. However, she found them respectful once they saw her work. The hotel's owners' finances were curtailed as a result of the savings and loan crisis in 1989.

They left in 1989 to open Acquerello in the Nob Hill area of the city, with Gresham again as head chef, and Paterlini running the front of house. The Donatello's owner, Mr Rossi, was angry at Gresham, who he accused of poaching Paterlini. Following two weeks of refitting, Acquerello was opened. Gresham ensured that there was a training environment in her kitchen, going as far as to assign additional homework to her staff on externships. She likes to leave out cook books for her staff to read, and offers to reimburse staff for books they have purchased. Acquerello was awarded a Michelin star in 2007, and in 2014 was awarded a second. This made Gresham one of three female chefs in the United States to hold two stars.

After 24 years running Acquerello, Gresham and Paterlini opened a second restaurant in 2013. They named it 1760, after the location of the restaurant at 1760 Polk Street. While Gresham oversaw the food as chef patron, the head chef was Adam Tortosa. In 2020, the 1760 restaurant closed.

In 2021, the same location of 1760 Polk Street was used to open a cocktail bar with small bites, Sorella. The Sorella’s culinary team includes the chef de cuisine, Denise St. Onge; and support from Seth Turiansky and Suzette Gresham.
