= The Golden Gopher =

Restored 1905 dive bar in Downtown Los Angeles

Coordinates: 34.04493°N 118.25631°W

- Industry: Dive bar
- Founded: 1905
- Headquarters: 417 W. 8th St, Los Angeles, CA 90014
- Owner: 213 Hospitality
- Website: goldengopherla.com

The Golden Gopher is a restored 1905 dive bar in Downtown Los Angeles at 417 W. 8th Street. It was originally dubbed The Golden Sun Saloon, reopening as the Golden Gopher in 2004. Due to its age, its original 1905 liquor license exempts it from abiding by certain present-day ordinances, such as prohibiting the sale or location of alcohol within a certain distance of the establishment's front door, or the prohibition of liquor-to-go. Former U.S. President Theodore Roosevelt was a rumored early owner of the bar. It is currently managed by L.A. entrepreneur Cedd Moses under his 213 Hospitality group which, as of 2018, oversees 17 other Los Angeles watering holes and eateries that are either in their original state or are located in historic buildings whose original uses differed from that of a food or drink business.

== Philanthropy ==
The Golden Gopher and 213 Hospitality are partnered with The Spirited Group as The Spirited Coalition for Change. The coalition aims to raise funds for and awareness of the homelessness crisis in the city. They aim to help "permanently end the cycle of homelessness on Skid Row and Los Angeles, provide special services in particular to the homeless women, children & veterans on Skid Row, and raise awareness of homelessness and Skid Row amongst [their] partners and patrons." One of the coalition's fundraising efforts involves donating a portion of the Golden Gopher's Moscow mule proceeds toward the coalition's activities.

== Use as a filming location ==
- The Golden Gopher appears in recording artist Taylor Swift's "Delicate" music video.
- The opening of Chris Brown's video for his song "Liquor" features the Golden Gopher's neon marquee.
- A scene in Torchwood: Miracle Day shows Captain Jack Harkness drinking there, although the story cites it as a bar in Washington, D.C.
