= Top Chef: Texas =

Season 9 of American television series

- Season 9
- Hosted by: Padma Lakshmi
- Judges: Tom Colicchio; Gail Simmons; Emeril Lagasse; Hugh Acheson
- No. of contestants: 29
- Winner: Paul Qui
- Runner-up: Sarah Grueneberg
- Location: San Antonio, Dallas, and Austin, Texas
- Finals venue: Whistler, British Columbia
- Fan Favorite: Chris Crary
- No. of episodes: 18

Release
- Original network: Bravo
- Original release: November 2, 2011 – March 7, 2012

Season chronology
- ← Previous; All-Stars Next → Seattle

Top Chef: Texas is the ninth season of the American reality television series Top Chef. The season was filmed in various cities in Texas, including San Antonio, Dallas, and Austin, before moving on to Whistler, British Columbia for the finale. The season premiered on November 2, 2011. This season of Top Chef featured a much larger number of contestants than any previous season, with 29 chefs. Top Chef: Texas also introduced a new side competition to the series; in addition to the Quickfire and Elimination Challenges featured in televised episodes, the Last Chance Kitchen competition allowed eliminated contestants to compete head-to-head in a series of webisodes, with the winner eventually returning to the main competition. In the season finale, Paul Qui was declared the winner over runner-up Sarah Grueneberg. Chris Crary was voted Fan Favorite.

== Contestants ==
The cast of Top Chef: Texas initially consisted of 29 contestants. After the qualifying challenges in the first two episodes, the pool of chefs was narrowed down to 16.

=== Eliminated in qualifying rounds ===
Name	Current Residence (Note: The contestants' city and state of residence during time of filming.)	Age
Jonathan Baltazar	Long Beach, California	36
Molly Brandt	Hollywood, Florida	30
Chaz Brown	New York, New York	29
Kimberly Calichio	New York, New York	27
Andrew Curren	Austin, Texas	32
Berenice deAraujo	Miami, Florida	33
Janine Falvo	Atlanta, Georgia	37
Simon Pantet	Seattle, Washington	30
Colin Patterson	Seattle, Washington	37
Laurent Quenioux	Los Angeles, California	51
Tyler Stone	Sacramento, California	22
Nina Vicente	Seattle, Washington	29
Ashley Villaluz	Seattle, Washington	25

=== Top 16 ===
Name	Hometown	Current Residence	Age
Nyesha Arrington	Los Angeles, California		28
Lindsay Autry	Fayetteville, North Carolina	West Palm Beach, Florida	29
Ty-Lör Boring	Kansas City, Missouri	Brooklyn, New York	34
Chris Crary	Bucyrus, Ohio	Los Angeles, California	29
Richie Farina	Riverview, Florida	Chicago, Illinois	28
Sarah Grueneberg	Houston, Texas	Chicago, Illinois	29
Chris Jones	Fort Lauderdale, Florida	Chicago, Illinois	30
Beverly Kim	Downers Grove, Illinois	Chicago, Illinois	32
Edward Lee	Brooklyn, New York	Louisville, Kentucky	38
Whitney Otawka	Hesperia, California	Athens, Georgia	30
Paul Qui	Springfield, Virginia/Houston, Texas	Austin, Texas	31
Keith Rhodes	Wilmington, North Carolina		39
Grayson Schmitz	New Holstein, Wisconsin	New York, New York	28
Heather Terhune	St. Albans, Vermont	Chicago, Illinois	39
Chuy Valencia	Santa Rosa, California	Chicago, Illinois	25
Dakota Weiss	Quartz Hill, California	Los Angeles, California	35

Nyesha Arrington later competed in Top Chef Duels. Grayson Schmitz returned to compete in Top Chef: California.

== Contestant progress ==
Episode #		3^{2}	4	5	6	7	8	9	10	11	12	13	14	15	16	17
Quickfire Challenge Winner(s)		Dakota	Paul	Lindsay	Grayson	Ty-Lör^{1}	Paul^{1}	Ty-Lör	N/A	Lindsay	Chris J.^{1} Grayson^{1}	Edward^{1}	Sarah^{4}	N/A	Sarah^{1}	N/A
Contestant		Elimination Challenge Results														
1	Paul	WIN	IN	WIN	IN	IN	IN	WIN	LOW	WIN	WIN	IN	WIN	WIN	WIN	WINNER
2	Sarah	LOW	WIN	HIGH	IN	IN	WIN	LOW	HIGH	LOW	LOW	LOW	IN^{4}	WIN	IN	RUNNER-UP
3	Lindsay	LOW	IN	IN	IN	IN	IN	WIN	HIGH	HIGH	HIGH	WIN	LOW	WIN	OUT	
4	Beverly	WIN	LOW	IN	IN	LOW	HIGH	LOW	WIN	OUT			HIGH^{3}	OUT		
5	Edward	WIN	IN	IN	LOW	WIN	HIGH	LOW	LOW	HIGH	LOW	LOW	OUT			
6	Grayson	WIN	IN	HIGH	IN	LOW	LOW	WIN	HIGH	LOW	HIGH	OUT				
7	Chris J.	WIN	IN	LOW	HIGH	LOW	IN	LOW	LOW	HIGH	OUT					
8	Ty-Lör	LOW	IN	LOW	LOW	WIN	IN	LOW	OUT							
9	Chris C.	IN	WIN	LOW	IN	IN	LOW	OUT								
10	Heather	WIN	IN	IN	WIN	LOW	OUT									
11	Nyesha	IN	LOW	IN	HIGH	OUT										
11	Dakota	IN	IN	HIGH	IN	OUT										
13	Whitney	IN	IN	IN	OUT											
14	Chuy	WIN	WIN	OUT												
15	Richie	WIN	OUT													
16	Keith	OUT														

^Note 1: The chef(s) did not receive immunity for winning the Quickfire Challenge.
^Note 2: Due to the qualifying rounds, the show did not use its traditional elimination format until the third episode.
^Note 3: Beverly won Last Chance Kitchen and returned to the competition.
^Note 4: As a reward for winning the Quickfire Challenge, Sarah was allowed to sit out the Elimination Challenge.

(WINNER) The chef won the season and was crowned "Top Chef".
(RUNNER-UP) The chef was a runner-up for the season.
(WIN) The chef won the Elimination Challenge.
(HIGH) The chef was selected as one of the top entries in the Elimination Challenge, but did not win.
(IN) The chef was not selected as one of the top or bottom entries in the Elimination Challenge and was safe.
(LOW) The chef was selected as one of the bottom entries in the Elimination Challenge, but was not eliminated.
(OUT) The chef lost the Elimination Challenge.

== Episodes ==
No. overall	No. in season	Title	Original release date	US viewers (millions)
122	1	"Everything's Bigger in Texas"	November 2, 2011	1.59
Location: San Antonio Qualifying Challenge: The first group of chefs created a feast with an entire pig, which had only been partially butchered. Each chef had to use one part of the pig; the group had collective responsibility over butchering down to their assigned cuts. Based on the results, the chefs either landed a spot in the Top 16, were eliminated from the competition, or placed "on the bubble". Those put on the bubble were given a second chance at earning a Top Chef coat.: Group 1: Chris J., Colin, Grayson, Heather, Molly, Nyesha, Richie, Sarah, Simon, Tyler; Qualified: Chris J., Heather, Nyesha, Richie, Sarah; Bubble: Grayson, Molly; Eliminated: Colin, Simon, Tyler; Qualifying Challenge: The second group of chefs created dishes using a collectively-decided ingredient. The chefs chose rabbit.: Group 2: Chris C., Chuy, Dakota, Edward, Janine, Keith, Nina, Ty-Lör, Whitney; Qualified: Chris C., Chuy, Dakota, Keith, Ty-Lör, Whitney; Bubble: Edward, Janine; Eliminated: Nina
123	2	"The Heat Is On"	November 9, 2011	1.64
Location: San Antonio Qualifying Challenge: The third group of chefs each chose an ingredient from a provided assortment. Unbeknownst to the chefs, each ingredient also had an associated time limit of either 20 minutes, 40 minutes, or 60 minutes.: Group 3: Andrew, Ashley, Berenice, Beverly, Chaz, Jonathan, Kim, Laurent, Lindsay, Paul; Qualified: Beverly, Lindsay, Paul; Bubble: Andrew, Laurent; Eliminated: Ashley, Berenice, Chaz, Jonathan, Kim; Qualifying Challenge: The contestants put on the bubble had 45 minutes to cook any dish.: Group 4: Andrew, Edward, Grayson, Janine, Laurent, Molly; Qualified: Edward, Grayson; Eliminated: Andrew, Janine, Laurent, Molly
124	3	"Quinceañera"	November 16, 2011	1.45
Location: San Antonio Quickfire Challenge: The chefs cooked dishes using rattlesnake. The winner received immunity and $5,000.: Winner: Dakota (Beer-Battered Tempura Rattlesnake); Elimination Challenge: The chefs, divided into two teams, catered a quinceañera with upscale Mexican food.: Pink Team: Chris C., Dakota, Keith, Lindsay, Nyesha, Sarah, Ty-Lör, Whitney; Green Team: Beverly, Chris J., Chuy, Edward, Grayson, Heather, Paul, Richie; Winner: Green Team; Eliminated: Keith (Pork Tenderloin Huarache with Pineapple Salsa; Enchiladas en Salsa Verde)
125	4	"Red Hot Chili Cook-Off"	November 23, 2011	1.67
Location: San Antonio Quickfire Challenge: The chefs made dishes using an assortment of chiles, ranging from mild to hot on the Scoville scale. The winner received immunity, as well as a cash prize associated with each ingredient. The hotter the chile used, the higher the possible prize.: Winner: Paul (Chilled Coconut Soup with Kaffir Lime, Ghost Pepper Relish); Elimination Challenge: The chefs participated in a Texas chili cook-off. The contestants were randomly divided into five teams of three and had all night to cook. The dishes were cooked at the house where the contestants resided rather than the Top Chef kitchen, limiting the cooking supplies available. Winners were selected by crowd vote. The members of the losing team then competed against one another to rework their losing chili into a winning dish.: Red Team: Chris J., Dakota, Whitney; Green Team: Chris C., Chuy, Sarah; Blue Team: Edward, Heather, Paul; Black Team: Beverly, Nyesha, Richie; White Team: Grayson, Lindsay, Ty-Lör; Winner: Green Team (Chili Con Carne); Eliminated: Richie (Frito-Encrusted Pork Tenderloin, Potato Hash & Ricotta Cheese Chili Purée)
126	5	"Don't Be Tardy for the Dinner Party"	November 30, 2011	1.86
Location: Dallas/Fort Worth Quickfire Challenge: The chefs prepared dishes using only the ingredients provided in backpack survival kits. The winner received immunity and a $5,000 cash prize.: Winner: Lindsay (Triple Club with Tuna & Sardines in French Onion Soup with Vienna Sausage); Elimination Challenge: Each chef had to create a dish for a course in a progressive dinner party in the exclusive Dallas neighborhood of Highland Park. The chefs were divided into three teams: appetizers, entrées and desserts. Each team was given $250, 30 minutes to shop, and two hours to prepare their meals.: Team Appetizer: Chris J., Lindsay, Paul, Sarah, Whitney; Team Entrée: Beverly, Chuy, Heather, Nyesha, Ty-Lör; Team Dessert: Chris C., Dakota, Edward, Grayson; Winner: Paul (Fried Brussels Sprouts with Grilled Prosciutto); Eliminated: Chuy (Sockeye Salmon Fillet Stuffed with Goat Cheese)
127	6	"Higher Steaks"	December 7, 2011	1.70
Location: Dallas/Fort Worth Quickfire Challenge: The chefs were given 90 minutes to prepare a dish that incorporated their own interpretation of one of Auguste Escoffier's five "mother sauces": béchamel, espagnole, hollandaise, tomate, or velouté. The winner received immunity.: Winner: Grayson (Scallop, Charred Corn Sauce, Corn Ravioli & Blueberry Balsamic Reduction); Elimination Challenge: The chefs worked as a team to cater a four-course steak dinner for 200 at the annual Cattle Baron's Ball. Two of the courses had to contain steak. They had 30 minutes to plan the menu, 45 minutes to shop, and three hours to prep on the first day. On the day of the event, the chefs had three hours to cook and serve at Southfork Ranch in Dallas. The winner received a 2011 Toyota Venza.: First Course (Soup): Beverly, Dakota, Sarah; Second Course (Appetizer): Chris J., Edward, Paul; Third Course (Entrée): Chris C., Nyesha, Ty-Lör, Whitney; Fourth Course (Dessert): Grayson, Heather, Lindsay; Winner: Heather ("Right Side Up" Texas Peach Cake, Peach Salad & Candied Pecan Streusel); Eliminated: Whitney (Creamy Potato Gratin)
128	7	"Game On"	December 14, 2011	1.74
Location: Dallas/Fort Worth Quickfire Challenge: The chefs were shown several varieties of tequila. They were then given 30 minutes to create a dish that pairs well with the tequila of their choice. Instead of immunity, the winner received $5,000.: Winner: Ty-Lör (1942: Steamed Clams in Thai Style Fish Caramel Sauce); Elimination Challenge: Working in teams of two, the chefs served a game dinner. Each team had 30 minutes to shop, three hours to prep, and 90 minutes to cook and serve at Tim Love's restaurant. The chefs decided among themselves which three teams had the least successful dishes. The judges then selected one of the teams to be eliminated. The winning team split $10,000.: Team Boar: Lindsay and Chris C.; Team Duck: Beverly and Heather; Team Elk: Grayson and Chris J.; Team Quail: Edward and Ty-Lör; Team Squab: Paul and Sarah; Team Venison: Dakota and Nyesha; Winners: Edward, Ty-Lör (Sorghum Quail with Pickled Cherries & Eggplant); Eliminated: Dakota, Nyesha (Roasted Rack of Venison with Kabocha Squash & Beet Gratin)
129	8	"Tribute Dinner"	December 21, 2011	1.69
Location: Austin Quickfire Challenge: The chefs prepared dishes that incorporated fan suggestions sent in via Twitter during the challenge. Instead of immunity, the winner received $10,000.: First Tweet ("Better With Bacon"): The chefs had 45 minutes to cook a dish with bacon.; Second Tweet (Hashtag Challenge): The chefs had to incorporate a hash into their dishes.; Third Tweet (Extra Ingredient): The chefs had to use a pantry ingredient randomly chosen for them by another contestant.; Winner: Paul (Bacon Fat, Crispy Bacon, Blackberries, Chorizo & Mushroom Hash); Elimination Challenge: The chefs were tasked with making dishes honoring their cooking influences as part of a tribute dinner. They had 30 minutes to shop, then two hours the next day to cook and serve their meals to the judges at the Driskill Hotel in Austin.: Winner: Sarah (Pork Sausage Stuffed Cabbage & Spinach with Browned Butter); Eliminated: Heather (Beef Stroganoff with Herb Spaetzle & Roasted Wild Mushrooms)
130	9	"BBQ Pit Wars"	January 4, 2012	1.94
Location: Austin Quickfire Challenge: The chefs were given 45 minutes to create a dish that best illustrated Modernist Cuisine, an encyclopedia and guide to the science of contemporary cooking. The winner received immunity and a copy of Modernist Cuisine.: Winner: Ty-Lör (Watermelon, Vanilla Bean Honey, Black Pepper & Salted Olive Oil Powder); Elimination Challenge: The chefs, separated into three teams, catered a barbecue meal for 300 guests. Each team was required to use brisket, pork ribs, and chicken in their dishes, in addition to serving two side dishes. The chefs were able to cook through the night and had access to individual pits, a smoker, and a trailer kitchen. The winning team split $15,000.: Blue Team: Grayson, Lindsay, Paul; Red Team: Edward, Sarah, Ty-Lör; White Team: Beverly, Chris C., Chris J.; Winner: Blue Team (Asian Spare Rib, Chicken & Brisket, Brussels Sprouts & Watermelon Salad); Eliminated: Chris C. (Beer Can Chicken, Brisket & Dr Pepper Glazed Pork Ribs)
131	10	"Restaurant Wars"	January 11, 2012	1.82
Location: Austin Elimination Challenge: The chefs, working in two teams divided by gender, had to create a pop-up restaurant and execute a three-course dinner service. Each chef was responsible for at least one dish on their team's menu. One member from the losing team was eligible for elimination. The winner received a 3-liter bottle of EPISODE wine from Terlato Family Vineyards and a trip for two to tour their Napa Valley vineyard.: Canteen: Chris J., Edward (FOH), Paul, Ty-Lör; First Course: Thai Style Crab & Shrimp Salad, Caramel Fish Sauce & Peanuts (Ty-Lör); Ham & Pork Pâté with Mushrooms, Braised Mustard Seeds & Duck Fat Crostini (Paul); Second Course: Poached Salmon in Warm Tomato Water, Clams, Salmon Skin & Tomatillo Jam (Paul and Ty-Lör); Crispy Skin Pork Belly with Green Apple & Sweet Potato Purée (Paul); Third Course: Almond Joy Cake with Malted Chocolate Mousse & Banana Coconut Purée (Edward); Homemade Cracker Jack, Cherries & Peanut Butter Ice Cream (Chris J.); Half Bushel: Beverly, Grayson, Lindsay (FOH), Sarah; First Course: Peach Salad with Pickled Shallots, Bacon Vinaigrette & Candied Pistachio (Grayson); Mozzarella Filled Arancino, Sweet & Sour Eggplant & Celery Salad (Sarah); Second Course: Braised Short Rib with Thai Basil Potato Purée, Apple Slaw & Kimchi (Beverly); Grilled Halibut with Spanish Chorizo, Fennel & Sherry Salad (Lindsay); Third Course: Schaum Torte with Vanilla Meringue & Champagne Berries (Grayson); Hazelnut Cream Italian Doughnuts with Banana Sugar Glaze (Sarah); Winner: Beverly; Eliminated: Ty-Lör
132	11	"Fit for an Evil Queen"	January 18, 2012	2.00
Location: San Antonio Quickfire Challenge: The chefs had to make sophisticated dishes that incorporated three ingredients from a random assortment provided by a quickly moving conveyor belt. The winner received immunity.: Winner: Lindsay (Bouillabaisse with Fennel-Pernod Broth); Elimination Challenge: Each chef prepared a dish inspired by the 2012 gothic film adaptation of the "Snow White" fairy tale, Snow White and the Huntsman.: Winner: Paul (Foie Gras with Bacon, Pumpernickel, Pickled Cherries & Beets); Eliminated: Beverly (Seared Halibut with Red Curry Coulis & Forbidden Black Rice)
133	12	"Block Party"	January 25, 2012	1.83
Location: San Antonio Quickfire Challenge: The chefs paired off for a mise en place relay, where they had 30 minutes to both prepare ingredients for the judges' inspection and combine them into one dish. The prep tasks included making fresh pasta, shelling and deveining shrimp, and husking corn. The winning team received $10,000. From this point onward, immunity was no longer offered.: Winner: Chris J., Grayson (Fettuccine, Toasted Corn, Poached Shrimp, Chili, Bacon & Rosemary); Elimination Challenge: In the same pairs as the Quickfire, the chefs catered a neighborhood block party. Each pair decided together on a common main dish and side dish, but were competing against each other to separately prepare their own versions. As a twist, after selecting their dishes, the chefs were told that they had to prepare healthy, low-fat, low-sodium dishes. The crowd's favorite for each pair was eligible for the win, while the crowd's least favorite was eligible for elimination. The winner received $15,000.: Winner: Paul (Turkey Kalbi, Eggplant with White Peach Kimchi); Eliminated: Chris J. (Chicken Salad Sandwich with Tofu "Mayo", Red Lettuce, Watermelon Fruit Salad with Pineapple Ice)
134	13	"Bike, Borrow & Steal"	February 1, 2012	2.01
Location: San Antonio Quickfire Challenge: Each chef made their own creative version of pancakes. The quickfire guest judge was Paul Reubens in his Pee-wee Herman persona. The winner received $5,000.: Winner: Edward (Pancake Bits, Blueberries, Raspberries, Strawberries, Bacon & Brûléed Marshmallow); Elimination Challenge: The chefs were given bikes to shop for their own ingredients, and had to find their own cooking spaces somewhere in the environs around The Alamo.: Winner: Lindsay (Stuffed Zucchini with Braised Beef Cheeks, Rice & Goat Cheese); Eliminated: Grayson (Egg, Spinach & Gorgonzola Stuffed Chicken & Butternut Roasted Squash)
135	14	"Mentors at Work?"	February 8, 2012	2.02
Quickfire Challenge: The chefs selected ingredients from the pantry while blindfolded and incorporated all of them into one dish. The winner received a choice between either a Toyota Prius V or an automatic pass into the finals.: Winner: Sarah (Corn Soup with Onion, Red Chili, Roasted Mushrooms & Peaches); Elimination Challenge: The chefs each prepared a dish inspired by a chef for whom they had previously worked for. These mentors acted as the guest judges.: Winner: Paul (Chilled Sunchoke & Dashi Soup with Summer Vegetables); Eliminated: Edward (Braised Pork Belly & Smoked Oyster Crema with Pickled Vegetables)
136	15	"Culinary Games"	February 15, 2012	1.74
Elimination Challenge: The competition moved to Whistler Olympic Park in British Columbia, where the four remaining chefs were confronted with a series of three Olympic-themed challenges, in honor of Vancouver's hosting of the 2010 Winter Olympics. The winner of each challenge received $10,000 and the right to move on in the competition.: Event 1: Each chef created a dish using equipment and ingredients found in a moving gondola lift. When the gondola reached the next station, each chef briefly exited and chose one ingredient from an assortment laid out for them, which then had to be incorporated into the final dish. The chefs needed to complete their dishes by the time the gondola finished its return trip.; Winner: Lindsay (Seared Salmon, Red Quinoa "Risotto" with Chorizo & Horseradish Vinaigrette); Event 2: The contestants had an hour to break out ingredients that had been frozen in ice blocks and make a dish out of them while outdoors in frigid weather.; Winner: Paul (Poached King Crab, Toasted Almonds, Mango Chutney with Orange Marmalade); Event 3: The two remaining competitors took part in a biathlon competition to collect ingredients. After skiing back and forth on a cross-country course, they had to use a rifle to shoot at targets representing one of a variety of ingredients. Each chef was allowed to use the ingredient written on the targets that they hit, but was also limited to ten shots total (hit or miss). Once the ingredients were determined, the chefs had 20 minutes to make a dish incorporating them.; Winner: Sarah (Braised Rabbit Leg & Heart with Cherries, Hazelnuts & Sauerkraut Purée); Eliminated: Beverly (Arctic Char, Onion & Beet Compote, Celery Root Truffle Purée & Fennel Salad)
137	16	"Fire and Ice"	February 22, 2012	1.79
Quickfire Challenge: The chefs were each paired in a tag team challenge with a previous Top Chef Masters contestant: Takashi Yagihashi, Anita Lo, and Floyd Cardoz. The teammates were unable to speak to each other during the challenge, and only one was able to cook in the kitchen at a time. Each chef had two ten-minute rounds to cook. The winner received $20,000.: Winner: Sarah (Pan-Seared Cod with Coconut Curry, Crab Salad with Clementine & Amaranth); Elimination Challenge: The chefs catered a "fire and ice"-themed event, where they prepared a dish and cocktail that incorporated a hot and cold element. The winner received a trip for two to Costa Rica.: Winner: Paul (Dish: King Crab with Lobster Broth & Lemon Snow; Cocktail: "The Pan Am" Kaffir Lime, Thai Chilies & Rum); Eliminated: Lindsay (Dish: Halibut with Fiery Celery Root Salad; Cocktail: "Encendido" Vodka, Tomato & Horseradish)
138	17	"Finale"	February 29, 2012	1.85
Elimination Challenge: The two finalists were asked to lead their own restaurants and create a four-course tasting menu. They could select four sous chefs from candidates who were either master chefs (Marco Canora and Barbara Lynch) or other contestants eliminated earlier in the Top Chef competition. The finalists chose their sous chefs by tasting the dishes that they had prepared, without prior knowledge of who prepared each dish. Paul was assisted by Barbara Lynch, Chris C., Keith, and Ty-Lör, while Sarah was assisted by Heather, Grayson, Nyesha, and Tyler.: Paul: First Course: Chawanmushi, Edamame, Pea Shoots & Spot Prawns; Second Course: Grilled Sea Bass with Clam Dashi, Pickled Radishes & Mushrooms; Third Course: Congee with Scrambled Eggs, Uni, Kale & Smoked Albacore; Dessert: Coconut Ice Cream, Puffed Rice, Kumquats, Mangosteen, Thai Chili Foam & Jasmin Gelée; Sarah: First Course: Squid Ink Tagliatelle, Spot Prawns & Coconut; Second Course: Rye Crusted Steelhead Trout with Fennel Sauce, Pickled Beets & Gras Pista; Third Course: Braised Veal Cheek with Crispy Veal Sweetbreads; Dessert: Hazelnut Cake with Kumquat & Roasted White Chocolate Ganache; Winner: Paul; Runner-up: Sarah
139	18	"Reunion"	March 7, 2012	1.04

== Last Chance Kitchen ==
No.	Title	Original air date
1	"Andrew vs. Janine"	November 9, 2011
Challenge: The final two chefs to be eliminated during the qualifying rounds were given 30 minutes to cook a pizza.: Andrew: Mediterranean Pizza with Anchovies, Capers, Fried Calamari & Arugula.; Janine: Fig Pizza with Parmesan-Asiago, Soppressata, Arugula & Black Garlic.; Winner: Andrew; Eliminated: Janine
2	"Andrew vs. Keith"	November 16, 2011
Challenge: The chefs were given 10 minutes to prep and cook a dish containing six ingredients, including clams, lemons, onions, and peppers.: Andrew: Clams with Grilled Radicchio & Peperonata.; Keith: Clam Ceviche with Lemon Zest & Steamed Clams with Pancetta.; Winner: Keith; Eliminated: Andrew
3	"Keith vs. Richie"	November 23, 2011
Challenge: The chefs were asked to prepare a dish using at least three ingredients provided from the leftovers of a traditional Thanksgiving dinner.: Keith: Turkey & Sweet Corn Hash, Ham Fritter, Sweet Potatoes, Pumpkin Pie Smear; Richie: Turkey, Green Bean Casserole, Macaroni & Cheese Fritter & Cornbread Purée; Winner: Keith; Eliminated: Richie
4	"Keith vs. Chuy"	November 30, 2011
Challenge: Colicchio directed the chefs to Bolner's Meat Market in San Antonio, where they were given an entire rib rack of beef. The contestants were then given 45 minutes to butcher five bone-in ribeyes, and cook one of them into a "perfect" medium-rare steak.: Winner: Chuy; Eliminated: Keith
5	"Chuy vs. Whitney"	December 7, 2011
Challenge: The chefs created a classic American burger with one of two assigned proteins in 30 minutes.: Chuy: Ostrich & Ground Pork Burger with Fresno Chili Aioli & Onion Straws; Whitney: Elk & Pork Sausage Burger, Shallot & Garlic, Egg Sunny-Side Up; Winner: Whitney; Eliminated: Chuy
6	"Whitney vs. Dakota vs. Nyesha"	December 14, 2011
Challenge: The chefs cooked dishes with cactus as the main ingredient, using only a wok, in 30 minutes.: Whitney: Cactus & Chicken Fried Rice with Sriracha & Soy Sauce; Dakota: Shrimp Tostada with Watermelon & Prickly Pear Shooter; Nyesha: Asian-Style Scallops with Prickly Pear Garnish, Cilantro & Thai Basil; Winner: Nyesha; Eliminated: Dakota, Whitney
7	"Nyesha vs. Heather"	December 21, 2011
Challenge: The chefs had 30 minutes to create a dish using three different cooking techniques: frying, injecting, and foaming.: Nyesha: Brown Butter Foam & Beignet Injected with Caramel Sauce; Heather: Fried Gulf Shrimp Injected with Smoked Paprika & Porcini Mushroom Foam; Winner: Nyesha; Eliminated: Heather
8	"Nyesha vs. Chris C."	January 4, 2012
Challenge: The chefs had 30 minutes to create a dish using ingredients found in a gas station with a budget of $20.: Nyesha: Beer-Glazed Smoked Sausage with Pork Rind Tuile & Chili Cheese Sauce; Chris C.: Togarashi Spiced Tomato Soup with Spicy Pork Rinds, Grilled Cheese with Fried Ham & Pickle; Winner: Nyesha; Eliminated: Chris C.
9	"Nyesha vs. Ty-Lör"	January 11, 2012
Challenge: The chefs had 30 minutes to make a pastry dessert with the help of a sous-chef. Assistants were chosen from the remaining eliminated cheftestants. Nyesha chose Heather, and Ty-Lör chose Chris C.: Nyesha: Coconut & Lime Tart with Coconut, Crème Fraîche Mousse & Caramel Sauce.; Ty-Lör: Puff Pastry with Dark Chocolate Mascarpone Cream, Vanilla Bean Rum Cherries & Caramel Sauce; Winner: Nyesha; Eliminated: Ty-Lör
10	"Nyesha vs. Beverly"	January 18, 2012
Challenge: The chefs had 30 minutes to create a dish using black drum. The chefs were only allowed to go through the Top Chef kitchen once to gather all necessary ingredients and equipment. With 23 minutes remaining, Colicchio instructed the chefs to switch stations and surrender all ingredients to their opponent.: Nyesha: Seared Black Drum with Julienne of Tri-Pepper, Slaw & Pineapple Chutney; Beverly: Seared Black Drum with Oranges, Fennel & Black Olives; Winner: Beverly; Eliminated: Nyesha
11	"Beverly vs. Chris J."	January 25, 2012
Challenge: The chefs had 30 minutes to make a dish that incorporated all of the ingredients found in a "mystery box", which could not be opened until the timer started. As the challenge progressed, the chefs were given two additional ingredients to use in their final dish.: Beverly: Grilled Lamb Chop with Parsnips, Curry, Radicchio & White Anchovy Vinaigrette; Chris J.: Grilled Lamb Chop with Sweet Purée, Radicchio Salad with Pancetta, Pine Nuts & Apple; Winner: Beverly; Eliminated: Chris J.
12	"Beverly vs. Grayson"	February 1, 2012
Challenge: The chefs had 30 minutes to cook a dish worthy of competing in the finale.: Beverly: Red Snapper in Coconut Broth Infusion with Lemongrass, Ginger, Thai Basil & Cilantro; Grayson: Bacon Seared Scallop with Cherry & Champagne Grapes Gastrique, Pistachio & Tarragon; Winner: Beverly; Eliminated: Grayson
