= Uchi (restaurant) =

- Interactive map of Uchi

Restaurant information
- Established: 2003
- Owner: Tyson Cole
- Head chef: Tyson Cole
- Food type: Sushi
- Location: 801 South Lamar Boulevard, Austin, Texas, 78704, United States
- Coordinates: 30.257501°N 97.759588°W
- Other locations: Uchiko
- Website: uchirestaurants.com

Uchi is a sushi restaurant in Austin, Texas, which opened in 2003. The Japanese word "Uchi" translates to "house" in English.

== Sister restaurants ==
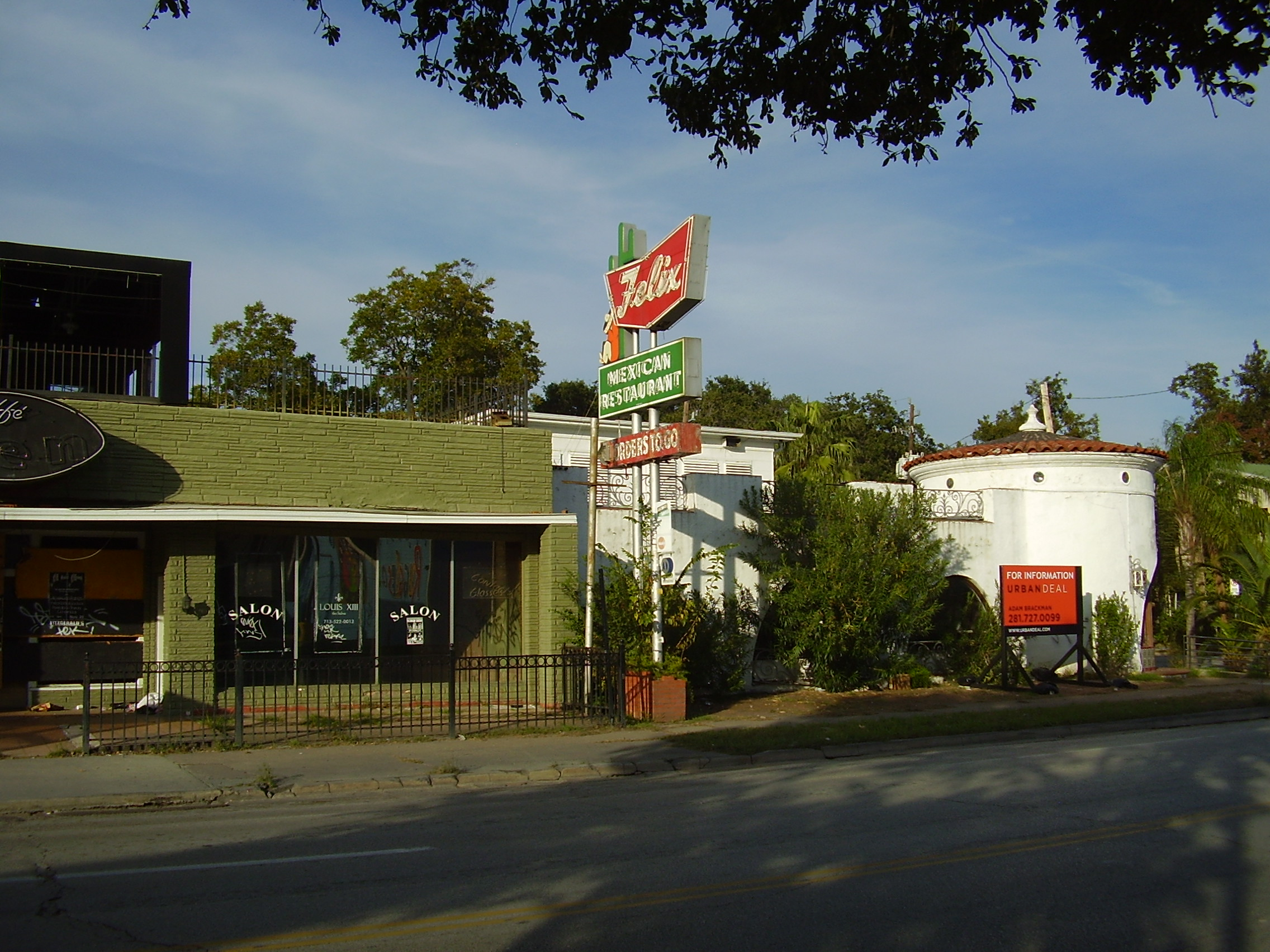
The former location of the final Felix Mexican Restaurant operation, which has since become Uchi

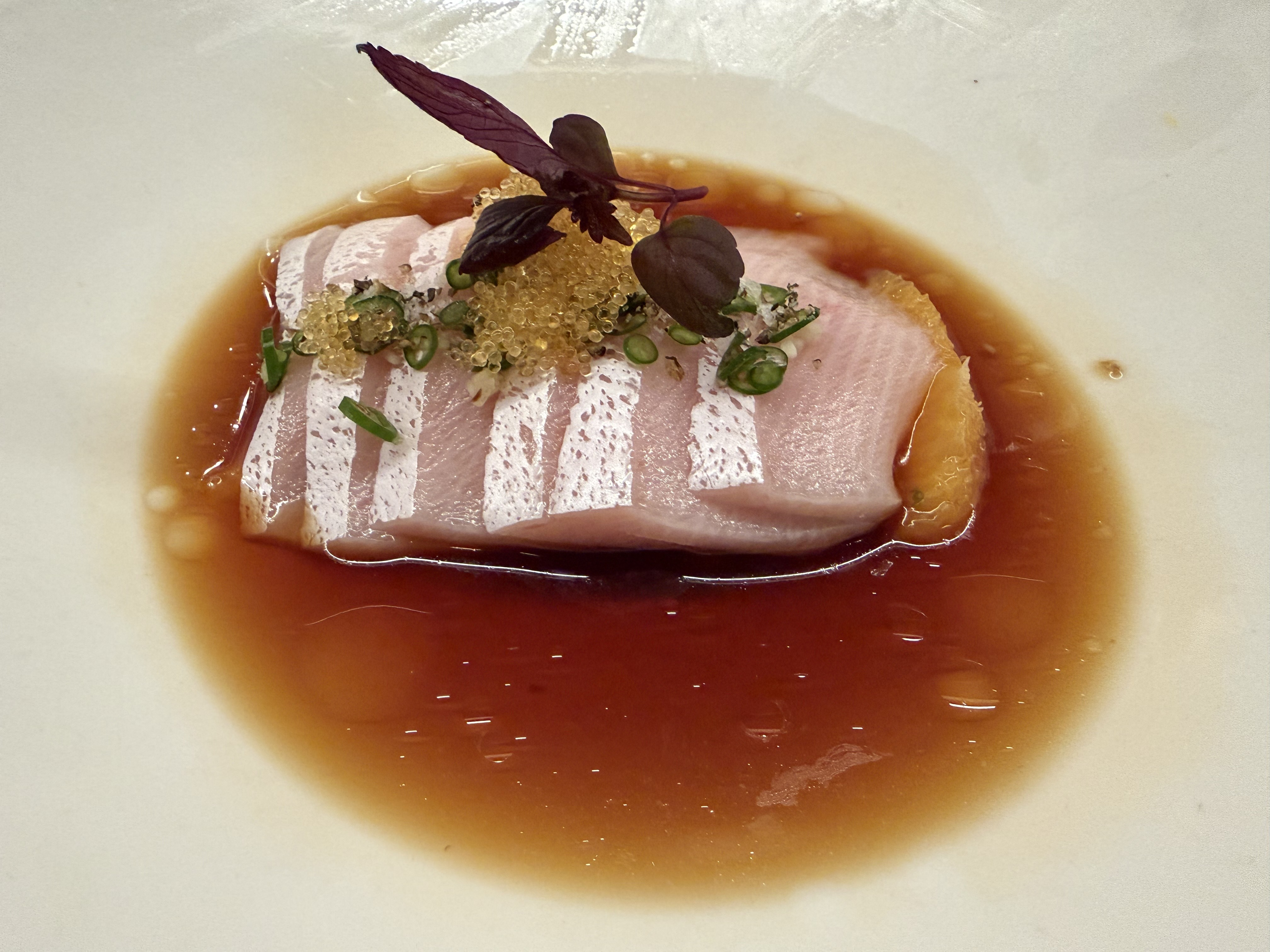
"Hama Chili" consisting of yellowtail in ponzu sauce with Thai chili and orange supreme at Houston location

Sister restaurants include:

- Uchiko, Tyson Cole’s follow up to his first restaurant, Uchi, opened its doors in July 2010. Translated as “child of uchi” from Japanese, Uchiko is located at 4200 North Lamar, just south of 45th Street in Central Austin.
- Uchiko Cherry Creek is set to open 2024, at 299 Fillmore St., Denver, CO, 80206.
- Uchi Houston opened in February 2012, located at 904 Westheimer Rd Houston, TX 77006 Chef Stephen Conklin is the current Chef de Cuisine.
- Uchi Dallas opened on June 1, 2015, located at 2817 Maple Ave., Dallas, TX 75201. Rhonda McCullar is the Chef de Cuisine. Right above Uchi is Uchiba, which is owned by the same people and recently opened in 2018.
- Uchi Denver open October 4, 2018, located at 2500 Lawrence St., Denver, CO 80205. Andres Araujo is the Chef de Cuisine.

== Awards ==
Notable awards for Uchi include

- The Daily Meal - 101 Best Restaurants in America for 2015
- Chefs Feed - The Best Dishes in Austin March 2015
- Thrillist - The 21 Best Sushi Spots in America January 2015
- The Daily Meal - The Best Sushi in America December 2014
- TripAdvisor - Travelers' Choice Awards for Fine Dining October 2014
- Zagat Guide - Austin's Best Restaurant September 2014
- Southern Living - 100 Best Restaurants in the South August 2014
- Nylon Magazine Guide to Austin - Best Restaurant November 2013
- Bon Appétit - 20 Most Important Restaurants in America October 2013
- Zagat Guide - 10 Austin Restaurant All-Stars September 2013
- Bon Appétit - The Best New Sushi Restaurants in America October 2012
- Travel and Leisure - Best Seafood Restaurants in America October 2012
- Rare Magazine – Best Fine Dining June 2010
- Rare Magazine – Best Service 2009, 2010
- Rare Magazine – Best Sushi 2008-2010
- Bon Appétit Magazine – Top Ten Sushi Spots April 2009
- The Fearless Critic – Best Restaurant in Austin 2008, 2010
- Zagat Guide – Best Food in Austin 2008-2010
- Houston Chronicle - Top Restaurants in Texas
- Austin Business Journal – Best Chef August 2007
- Austin American-Statesman XLENT – Five-star review May 2007
- Austin Chronicle reader’s poll Favorite Restaurant in Austin 2006-2010
- Austin Chronicle reader’s poll Best Sushi 2004-2010
- Austin Chronicle reader’s poll Best Chef 2005-2010
- Texas Monthly – Best New Restaurants in Texas February 2004

Notable awards for Uchiko include

- Houston Chronicle - Top new restaurants in Texas
- San Antonio Express - Top new eateries in the state
- Dallas Morning News - Top 10 new restaurants in Texas
- GQ Magazine- Top new restaurant in America 2010
- Texas Monthly - Where to Eat Now, February 2011

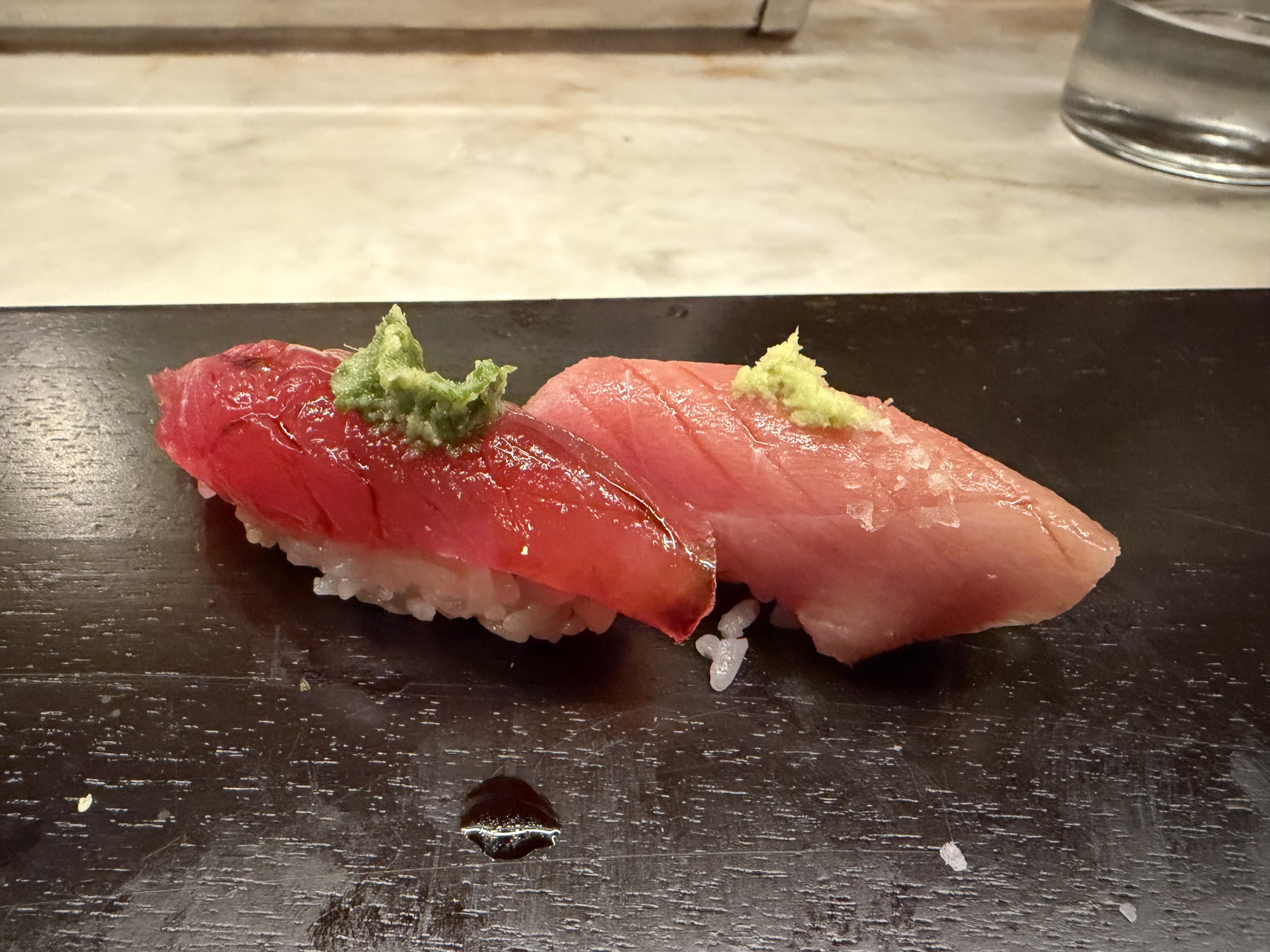
Two types of Tuna nigiri, hakami and chutoro, at Houston location

== See also ==
- List of restaurants in Austin, Texas
- List of sushi restaurants
