= History of the Culinary Institute of America =

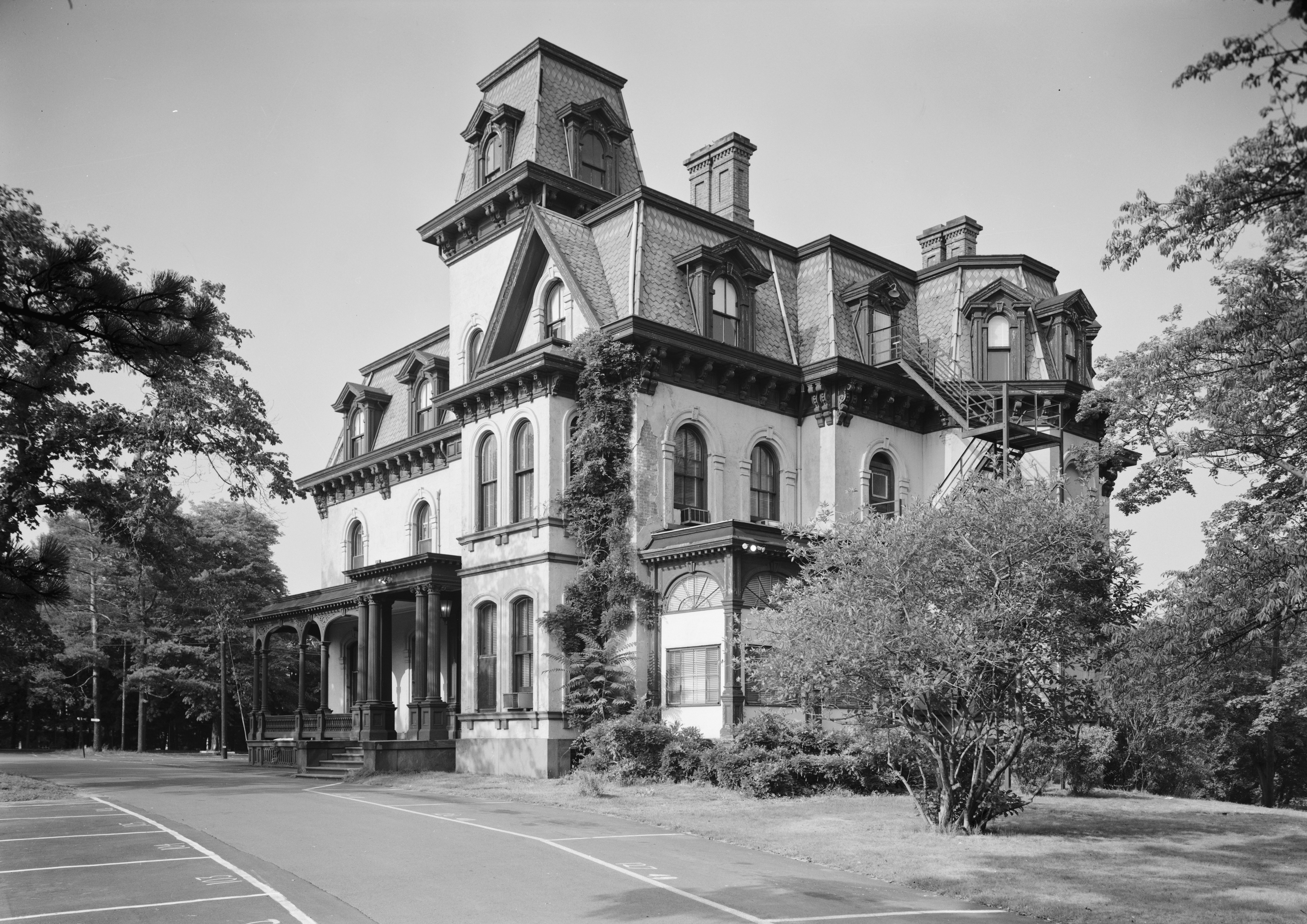
The Davies mansion at the time of its occupancy by the CIA

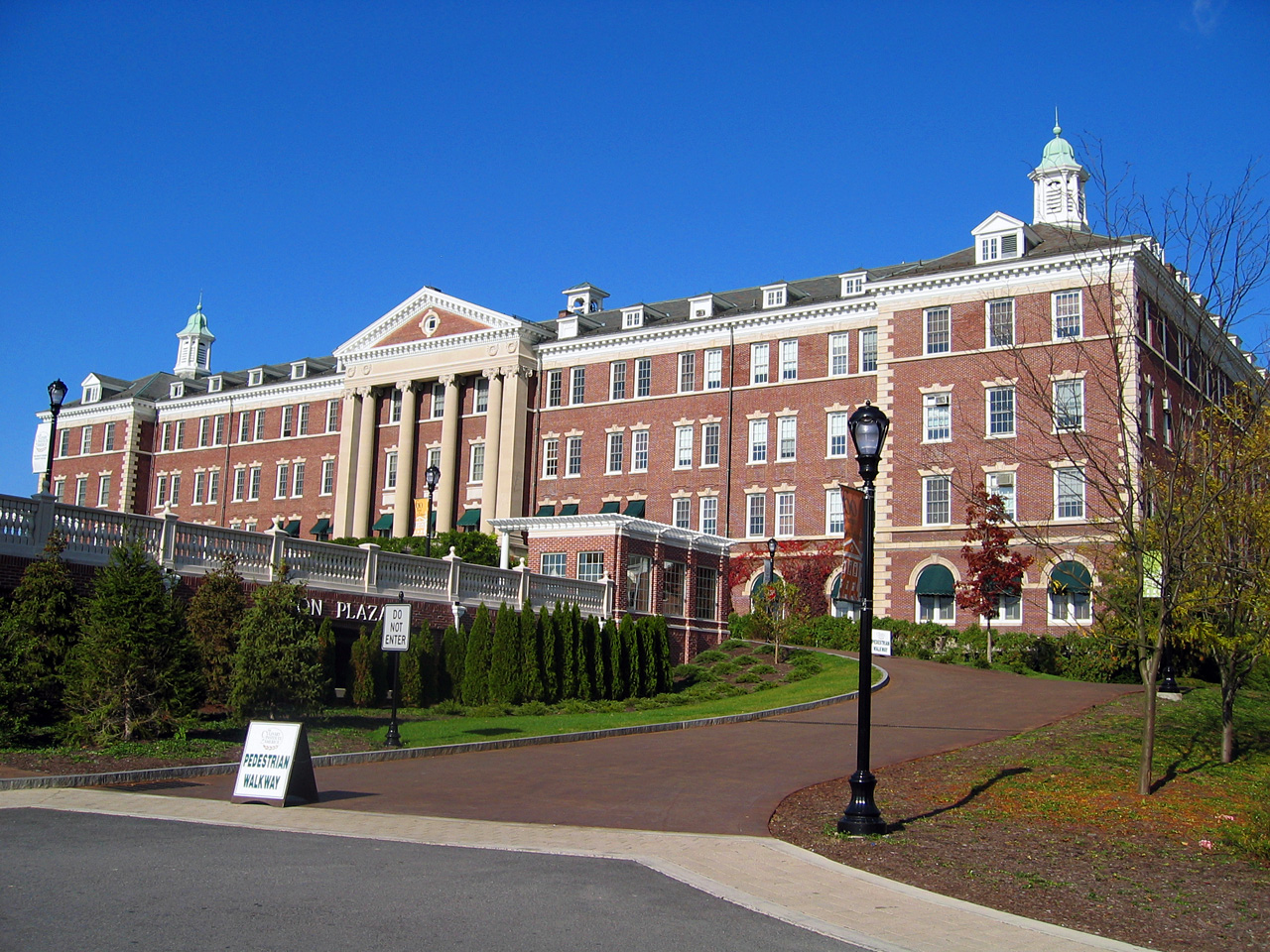
Roth Hall, the primary school facility at the school's main campus

The history of the Culinary Institute of America (CIA) began in 1946 in New Haven, Connecticut, where it was founded as a vocational institute for returning veterans of World War II. With a growing student body, the Culinary Institute purchased a former Jesuit novitiate in Hyde Park in 1970, which remains its central campus. The school began awarding associate degrees in 1971 and bachelor's degrees in 1993. The school opened its St. Helena campus in 1995, its Texas campus in 2008, its Singapore campus in 2010, and its Napa campus in 2016.

== Beginnings: 1946–1969 ==
The New Haven Restaurant Institute was founded by the New Haven Restaurant Association, with the assistance of culinary educator Frances Roth and Katharine Angell in New Haven, Connecticut. The vocational training school, intended for returning World War II veterans, held its first classes on May 22, 1946. Roth became the first administrative director, and Angell became the first president and chairman of the board, serving from 1946 to 1966. She built the school's relations with New Haven and especially close ties with Yale University. The first graduating class consisted of fifty students and three faculty: a dietitian, a baker, and a chef.

Originally housed in a storefront in New Haven, the school moved in 1947. With assistance from Yale University, the school purchased the Davies mansion in New Haven's Prospect Hill neighborhood, spending $75,000. The building, known as Angell Hall after James Rowland Angell, had a private chapel, as Angell found important for cooking schools. The building was joined by the adjacent Taft Mansion, now demolished. In 1947 the school was renamed the Restaurant Institute of Connecticut to reflect its growing repute; the school's name was changed again to the Culinary Institute of America in 1951.

== Relocation and early history ==
Enrollment grew to approximately 1,000 students by 1969, beyond the capacity of its original campus, so the school sold the New Haven property to Yale and purchased the St. Andrew-on-Hudson Jesuit novitiate in Hyde Park, New York in 1970. The 5-story, 150-room building was purchased along with 80 acres for $1 million. Following the purchase, the school began a $4 million renovation.

On November 19, 1971, the New York State Board of Regents granted the college its absolute charter incorporating a board of trustees and associates. The following year, the board of regents granted a charter for the college to begin awarding associate degrees. It began operating at the Hyde Park location in 1972.

In 1973, the school opened the Epicurean Room, later named the Escoffier Restaurant, which had a three-star New York Times rating and four stars on the Mobil Travel Guide. In 1974 the college built three residence halls, housing 880 students total. A fourth residence hall, Hudson Hall, was built in 1986 housing 350 students. Early in 1988, following a $1.5 million grant, the school built the General Foods Nutrition Center, housing the student-run St. Andrew's Cafe. That year the school also opened its Takaki School of Baking and Pastry building, holding three bakeshops, four pastry shops, four kitchens, and four lecture halls.

In 1993, the school was granted approval from the board of regents to establish two bachelors of professional studies degrees, and the school also opened its library building and Danny Kaye Theater. It was granted a $1.5 million gift from the Conrad N. Hilton Foundation. In July 1998, the Student Recreation Center opened.

== Recent history: 2000–present ==
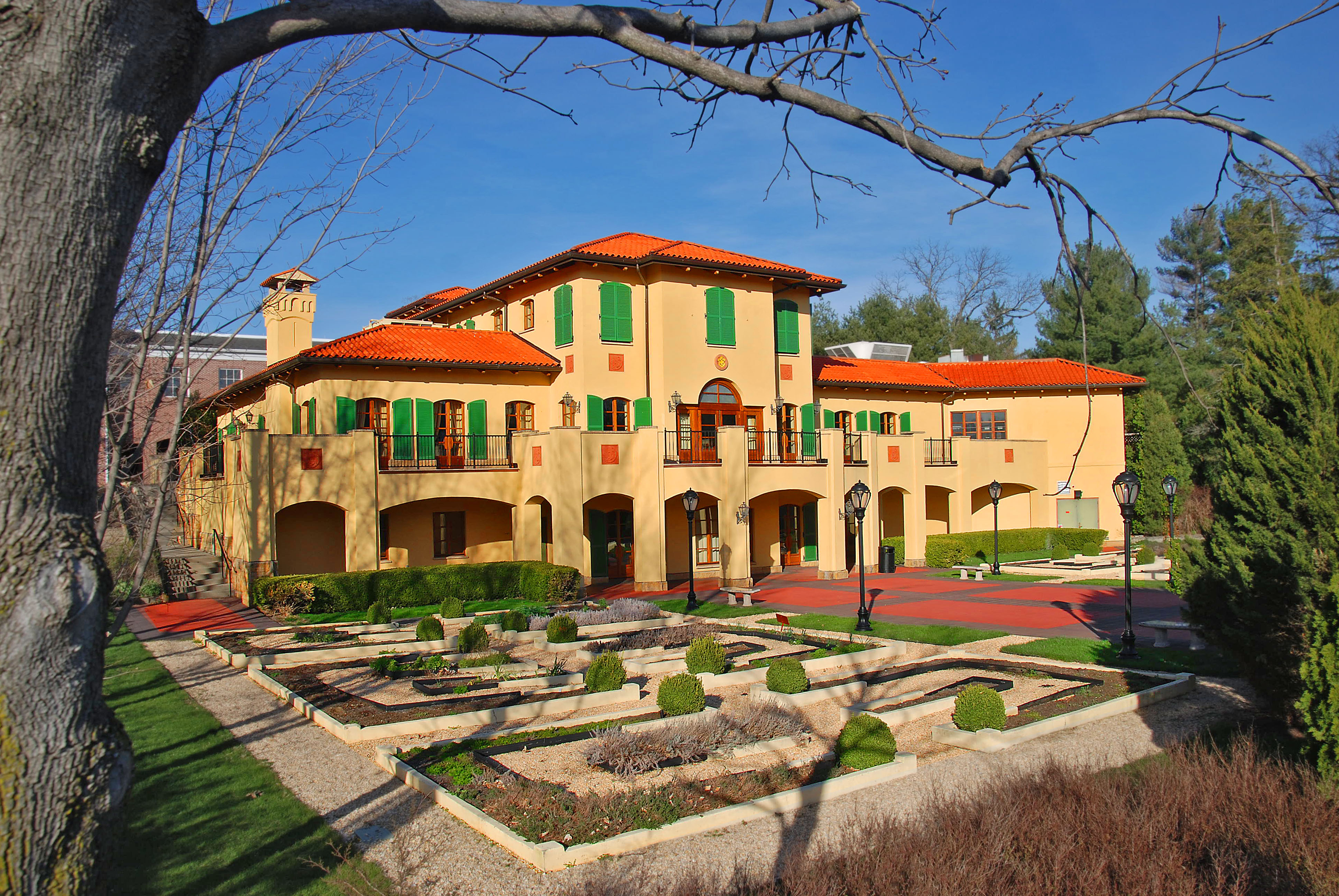
The Colavita Center houses the Ristorante Caterina de' Medici

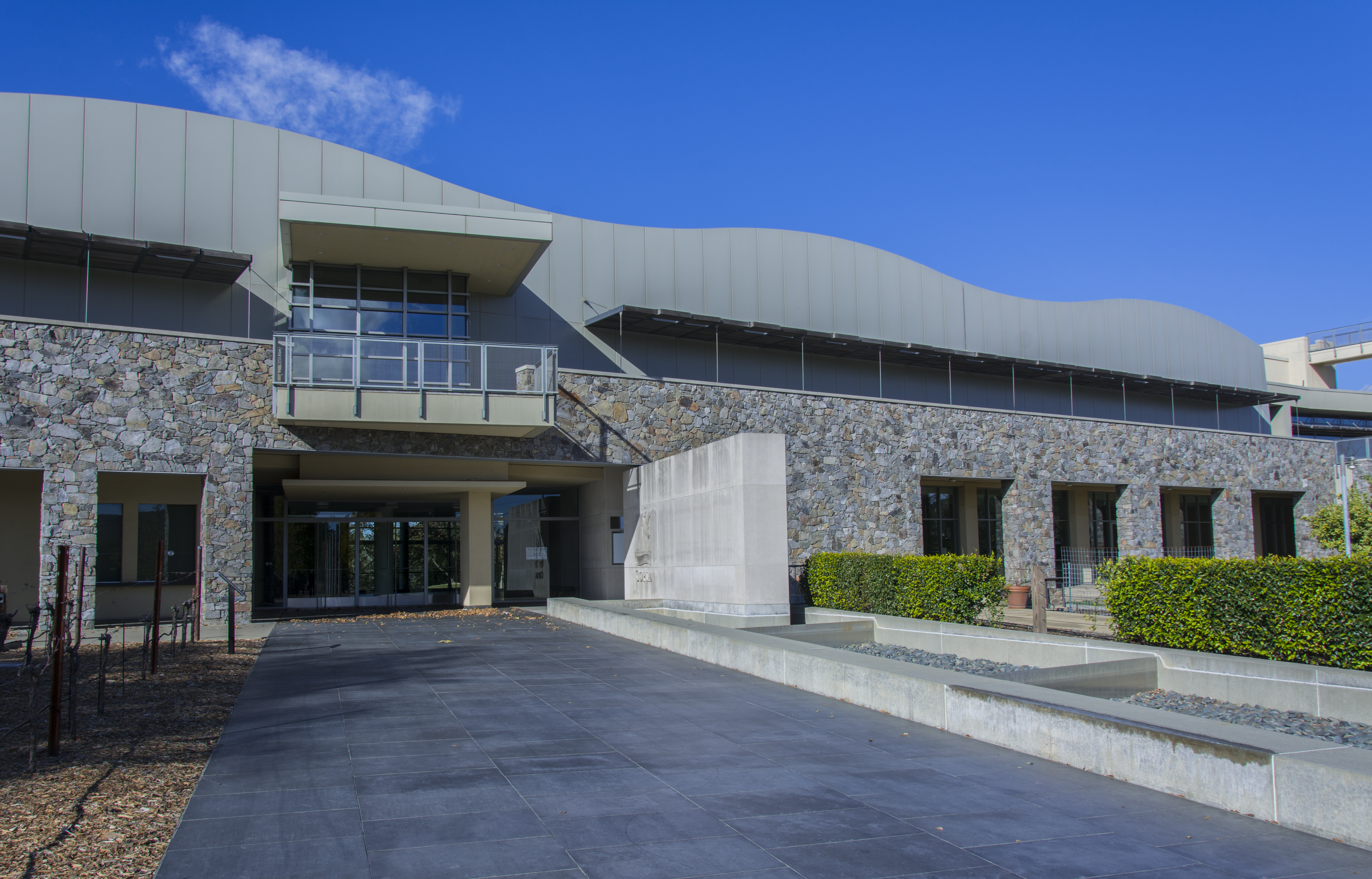
Copia, now the CIA at Copia campus

The Apple Pie Bakery Café opened in 2000, and the Colavita Center opened the following year. More residence halls were built at the school's Hyde Park campus in 2004. In 2005, Anton Plaza opened in Hyde Park while the Ventura Center for Menu Research and Development opened in St. Helena. The school's third campus opened in 2008 in San Antonio. Two years later, the CIA opened a campus in Singapore consisting of a facility on the campus of Temasek Polytechnic. In 2012, the CIA began offering a bachelor's degree program in culinary science, and in 2014 introduced a bachelor's degree in applied food studies. In 2015, the college expanded its recreation center and added a new dining facility for students, called The Egg. Both are housed in the CIA's Student Commons building. In the same year, the college acquired a portion of Copia, a museum in downtown Napa, California that operated from 2001 to 2008. In 2016, the college opened a campus, the Culinary Institute of America at Copia, which houses the CIA's new Food Business School. The college, which was outgrowing its St. Helena campus, purchased the northern portion of the property for $12.5 million (it was recently assessed for $21.3 million). In September 2016, the college replaced its Bachelor of Professional Studies business management program with a Bachelor of Business Administration degree program in food business management.

On April 23, 2008, amid complaints directed toward CIA president Tim Ryan, the school's teachers' union approved a vote of no confidence, with a vote of 85 to 9. The faculty described poor equipment, falling academic standards, and little support in the administration for complaints as causes. The largest complaints, laid out in a thirteen-item list, included outdated technology, poorly-designed uniforms, substandard school-bland kitchen equipment, overcrowded classes, complicated schedules, and poor record-keeping. The document described President Ryan as taking an autocratic style, ignoring staff input, and retaliating against criticism. Ryan later met with union representatives and described coming improvements in scheduling and curriculum. As a result of the event and changes made, the board confirmed unanimously their confidence in him and extended his contract.

Following the approval, students began organizing a protest, including creating several student groups on Facebook, and hanging "Fire Tim Ryan" signs in dorm rooms. The students described further complaints including the administration's close ties with the corporate food industry and less challenging kitchen tasks, such as frying frozen waffle fries. In May the school prevented the campus newspaper from writing about the issue, which prompted its editor to resign. The school later apologized and allowed a full report in the paper's next issue. Ryan held that he was trying to prevent students from being involved in a conflict between the faculty and administration.

On April 23, 2013, About 90 students left classes to protest a recent trend of less enforcement of a school policy. The policy, requiring applicants to have professional kitchen experience, has varied from three months to a year, and is currently six months; a 2011 revision allowed front-of-house service to count for the requirement. The protesting students signed letters to teachers and the school administration, gave speeches, and donned name tags with their student loan debt written on them.

In May 2017, the college announced it will be offering a Bachelor of Science degree in Hospitality Management starting September 2018.

== Demographics ==
The number of enrolled women has been increasing since the school opened in 1946, with its first graduating class having one woman among 50 students. By 1980, 20% of students were female, which rose to 30% by 2000 and 40% by 2006. In 2017, women became the majority at the school, with 51.6% of students.

Although it is often cited that women were not admitted to the school until 1970, there was one woman in the first class held, four in the next, and more in almost every class since then. From 1966 to 1971, women were not admitted, with the stated reason of limited facilities on their New Haven campus.

== See also ==
For the history of the campuses, see:

- Betts House
- Hyde Park campus of the Culinary Institute of America
- The Culinary Institute of America at Greystone
- The Culinary Institute of America at Copia
