= Amelie Kang =

Chinese chef and restauranteur

- Education: Culinary Institute of America
- Occupations: Chef, restauranteur

Amelie Ning Kang is a Chinese chef and restauranteur. In 2015, she founded the Sichuan restaurant MáLà Project, and in 2019, she founded the fast-casual restaurant Tomorrow.

In 2018, Kang was selected for Eater Young Guns. In 2020, she, Meng Ai, and Yishu He, as co-founders of MáLà Project, were named to Forbes 30 Under 30 for Food and Drink.

== Early life and career ==
Growing up south of Beijing, Kang grew up in a family of "good cooks" and "had a romantic relationship with food." She then went to the city for high school, worked at a French café, and looked for college education in culinary arts.

In 2010, Kang moved from Beijing to New York City in order to study at the Culinary Institute of America.

== Career ==
After school, Kang worked in various establishments including Bar Boulud, Café China, China Blue, and B-Flat.

In 2014, Kang had the idea to start a restaurant, which became MáLà Project one year later in the East Village. Kang opened another location in Bryant Park in 2018.

In 2019, Kang opened a dumpling and noodle restaurant, Chubby Princess, in the Financial District, Manhattan. However, it closed six months later due to the COVID-19 pandemic.
