= Katharine Angell =

Katharine Angell may refer to:

- Katharine Cramer Angell (1890–1983), co-founder of the Culinary Institute of America
- Katharine Sergeant Angell White (1892–1977), writer and the fiction editor for The New Yorker
