= Dan Coudreaut =

American chef

Dan Codreaut
- Born: November 8, 1965 (age 60); Ossining, New York
- Education: Culinary Institute of America
- Occupations: Executive chef, McDonald's, 2004-2018
- Years active: 1987-present

Dan Coudreaut (born November 8, 1965) is an American chef. He was the executive chef and vice president of culinary innovation at McDonald's from 2004 to 2018.

== Biography ==
Coudreaut started his culinary career at the age of 14, washing dishes in a local restaurant in his hometown of Ossining, New York. In 1995, he graduated at the top of his class from the Culinary Institute of America.

=== Culinary career ===
After graduating from the Culinary Institute of America, Coudreaut was hired as executive sous chef at Café Pacific before becoming the club chef at the Four Seasons Hotels and Resorts, both of which are in Dallas, Texas. In 2000, he moved to the field of chain restaurants, joining Metromedia Company's Ponderosa Steakhouse and Bonanza Family Steakhouse chains as director of culinary product development. He joined McDonald's in 2004, taking over as executive chef from Rene Arend. As executive chef, Coudreaut's main responsibility was helping the creative team of chefs to create concepts and develop new menus for McDonald's approximately 36,900 outlets. In 2012, he released a YouTube video revealing the recipe of the special sauce for the Big Mac. He left the company in 2018.

=== Accomplishments ===
Coudreaut has been listed among the NRN 50:R&D Culinarians by Nation's Restaurant News in 2003. In 2006, he received the magazine's Chef/Innovator MenuMasters Award.

He also sang lead vocals in Chef Dan and the Appetizers, a classic rock band formed by McDonald's employees in 2008 to raise money for Ronald McDonald Charities.

== Menu contributions ==
Coudreaut was responsible for the addition of several items to McDonald's national menu, including:

- Asian and Southwest Chicken Salads
- Angus and Chicken Snack Wraps
- Angus Burger sandwich line
- McCafe coffee drinks
- Oatmeal
- Real Fruit Smoothie beverages
- Spicy Premium Chicken sandwich
