= Connecticut Commission for Child Support Guidelines =

The Connecticut Child Support Guidelines are published by the Connecticut Commission for Child Support Guidelines pursuant to Connecticut General Statute 46b-215a. The Commission is required to meet within every four years to revise and update the Connecticut Child Support Guidelines.

== Commission Composition ==
The commission is composed of eleven members, seven of whom are determined by state office:

- The Chief Court Administrator or his designee
- the Commissioner of Social Services or his designee
- the Attorney General or his designee
- the chairpersons and ranking members of the joint standing committee on judiciary or their designees

The remaining four members are appointed by the Governor:

- a representative of the Connecticut Bar Association
- a representative of legal services,
- a person who represents the financial concerns of child support obligors
- a representative of the Permanent Commission on the Status of Women

The chairperson of the commission shall be elected by the members of the Commission. The goals of the Commission are to ensure the appropriateness of periodic child support payment awards.
