= Frances Roth =

American lawyer and founding director of the Culinary Institute of America

- Born: Frances Levenstein; April 1896; New Haven, Connecticut
- Died: June 20, 1971 (aged 75)
- Education: New York University Law School
- Occupations: Lawyer, director
- Known for: Firsts as a woman lawyer and directing the Culinary Institute of America
- Spouse: Charles G. Roth (m. 1917; div. ?)

Frances Levenstein Roth (April 1896 – June 20, 1971) was an American lawyer and founding director of the Culinary Institute of America.

Born in New Haven, Connecticut in April 1896, she earned a degree in law from New York University Law School and at the age of 21 became the first woman to be admitted to the Connecticut Bar Association, and then the first women prosecutor for New Haven in 1925. After leaving her job as assistant prosecutor at the New Haven city court in 1937, she aided the state's welfare commissioner on juvenile delinquency issues and supervised a newly formed juvenile court in the early 1940s. She also served as secretary of the Social Protection Committee in the Connecticut War Council during World War II.

She had developed a reputation for being able to "get things done", and the New Haven Restaurant Association asked her to direct a new culinary school, which eventually was named the Culinary Institute of America. The school opened on May 22, 1946, with sixteen students, and she ran it until 1965 by which time it had expanded to have over 300 students. In 1951 she discussed the school with Eleanor Roosevelt on the latter's radio program. Roth died in 1971, at the age of 75.

== Early life and education ==
Frances Levenstein was born in New Haven, Connecticut in April 1896. (Note: The Concise Dictionary of American Jewish Biography, citing the 1938 edition of Who's Who in American Jewry, gives her birth date as April 26. The article "Frances L. Roth: A Connecticut Trailblazer" in the Connecticut Lawyer gives a birth date of April 19.) Her brother also worked in law, earning a degree from Yale Law School. She went straight from high school to New York University School of Law at the age of 18. To pay for school, she worked at a settlement house in Manhattan, which helped engender a concern for children in crisis; at her father's shoe store in New Haven; and part-time at a law office in New Haven, which she left because her work at the shoe store paid more. After graduating, she was admitted to the Connecticut Bar Association at the age of 21—the first women to do so.

== Career ==
=== New Haven prosecutor ===
She became the first women prosecutor for New Haven, being assistant prosecutor at the New Haven city court from 1925 to 1937. Though she was "very capable" at her job according to the Hartford Courant, she faced opposition in reappointments to the post as some preferred a man do it.

During her time as assistant prosecutor, which was a part-time post, she worked in the domestic relations department, dealing with "abused or abandoned wives, delinquent husbands, wayward girls, and troublesome sons". She expressed her attitude as prosecutor as: "My first duty is to prosecute and obtain punishment of offenders. So I just don't feel anything at all about it. Of course, I am just as human as the next fellow but I refuse to let my feelings get the better of me. If you have some rotten apples on the social tree, the only thing to do is to pick them off." The Hartford Courant described her in 1934 as having "a rich good humor, a becoming frankness, natural sincerity and spontaneous wit ... a sturdy physique and an abundance of energy." By that time she had dealt with over 6000 family disputes.

Roth wrote articles on ways to improve the court system and advocated for the creation of a domestic relations court. She gave a lecture to the American Bar Association's criminal law section in October 1932 about the value of psychiatrists in examining offenders in courts. In 1933, the lecture was published in the New England Journal of Medicine.

=== State government ===
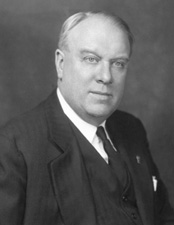
Governor Raymond Baldwin

Around the time of her resignation as assistant prosecutor in 1937, there was suggestion that she should run for Connecticut Secretary of State. In 1939 she was assigned to work in the Bureau of Child Welfare by Governor Raymond Baldwin—with whom she had legal and political contacts—to help Robert J. Smith, the welfare commissioner, with juvenile delinquency issues. She produced two reports on that matter. The first, about the "duties and responsibilities of the state commissioner of welfare re delinquency", described the role of juvenile probation officers in the state, and advocated for an overhaul of the juvenile probation system to match that of Massachusetts and an increase in the juvenile cut-off age to 18 from 16. The second report was on a "simplified system of the reporting the cases of juvenile offenders" and listed all juvenile probation officers in Connecticut, included a form she had created which was used in 169 towns, and recommended a statewide juvenile court rather than a juvenile judge for each congressional district. The report was given to Baldwin and Connecticut Supreme Court Chief Justice William M. Maltbie in mid-1940. Smith also asked her to advise juvenile court justices with interpretation of legislation and on how to improve their work.

In 1939, Roth led 150 women in the old Connecticut Senate chamber rallying for the passage of a juvenile court reform bill; she argued that Connecticut needed a "true juvenile court". Fiscal issues prevented the bill's passage that year. She advocated for the reform to the Judiciary Committee in the 1941 session, and the bill passed on the last day of it. Though she desired the post, Governor Hurley did not appoint Roth to one of the three juvenile court judge positions created by the law. However, she was assigned by Chief Justice Maltbie to arrange and supervise the new juvenile court.

=== World War II and private practice ===
While working in the judicial branch, Roth also became secretary of the Social Protection Committee in the Connecticut War Council during World War II. She identified places where troops should not go and wrote a paper titled "Drunkenness in Wartime Connecticut" on the increasing alcoholism due to the war; she suggested a commission to find solutions for the issue. To address juvenile delinquency, with issues of girls "following soldiers to camp; runaways who got picked up-often in trucks-and transient wayward minors who were hardest to control", she started an association of policewoman. Because of the rising amount of sexually transmitted diseases, she helped in the creation of a sex-education program for communities in 1944. That year she also proposed the Connecticut War Council fund a training center for guiding veterans, including psychologists for determining the veterans' work interests. The War Council presented the proposal to the Connecticut Reemployement Commission.

Roth's employment by the government ended in 1945. She then worked as a defense attorney, represented Connecticut in the American Arbitration Association, and wrote an article titled "Arbitration, a Vital Tool for Lawyers".

=== Culinary Institute of America ===
Roth had gained a reputation of being able to "get things done", which had impressed some restaurant owners that she had met through her work in the war. The executive secretary of the New Haven Restaurant Association, Charles Rovetti, asked Roth to direct a new culinary school. After some persuasion she agreed to start the school, then named the New Haven Restaurant Institute but now known as The Culinary Institute of America. Roth contacted the Connecticut commissioner of education Alonzo Grace to get the school accredited and thus qualify for payments under the GI Bill. Roth and Katharine Angell incorporated the school as a non-profit and therefore independent of the New Haven Restaurant Association. Roth picked staff and a board of directors. The school opened on May 22, 1946, with sixteen students, a budget of $12,700, and a ten-week course that included instructions on how to make foods like beef stew and apple pie. Roth aimed to grow the school. A report by the Connecticut State Department of Education from around 1949 said of Roth: "Her leadership, excellent contacts and dynamic personality have accomplished in two years, that which other groups or individuals would have required five to ten years to accomplish."

In December 1950, she testified to the House Select Committee investigating the education programs under the GI Bill; the Veterans Administration (VA) managing the GI Bill payments had deemed the institute that year as massively overcharging the VA. She described to the committee the founding, running, and finances of the institute and the issues with the VA the school had. To the committee she justified the expenses that had been pronounced improper: for example, the VA complained that there were "excessive charges" for the food used in culinary training which the students then ate, but she argued that the students needed practice with cooking gourmet food and that the food prepared needed to be eaten by the students so that they could appraise it.

She said she felt there was a bias against trade schools in the VA and that "we have gone white-collar haywire in this country of ours." Roth also said that "I have had boys come with their parents to our school to inspect and be absolutely astonished to find it the way it is pictured in the brochure. They simply have no faith in it until they come and actually see it." The committee members, persuaded that the institute was not engaging in malpractice, asked her for advice on bettering the teaching of veterans in trade schools.

She discussed the institute with Eleanor Roosevelt on the latter's radio program in 1951, telling Roosevelt that students almost always had three or four job offers after graduation and that students from 38 states attended the school. According to Roth's family, she also debated politics with Roosevelt.

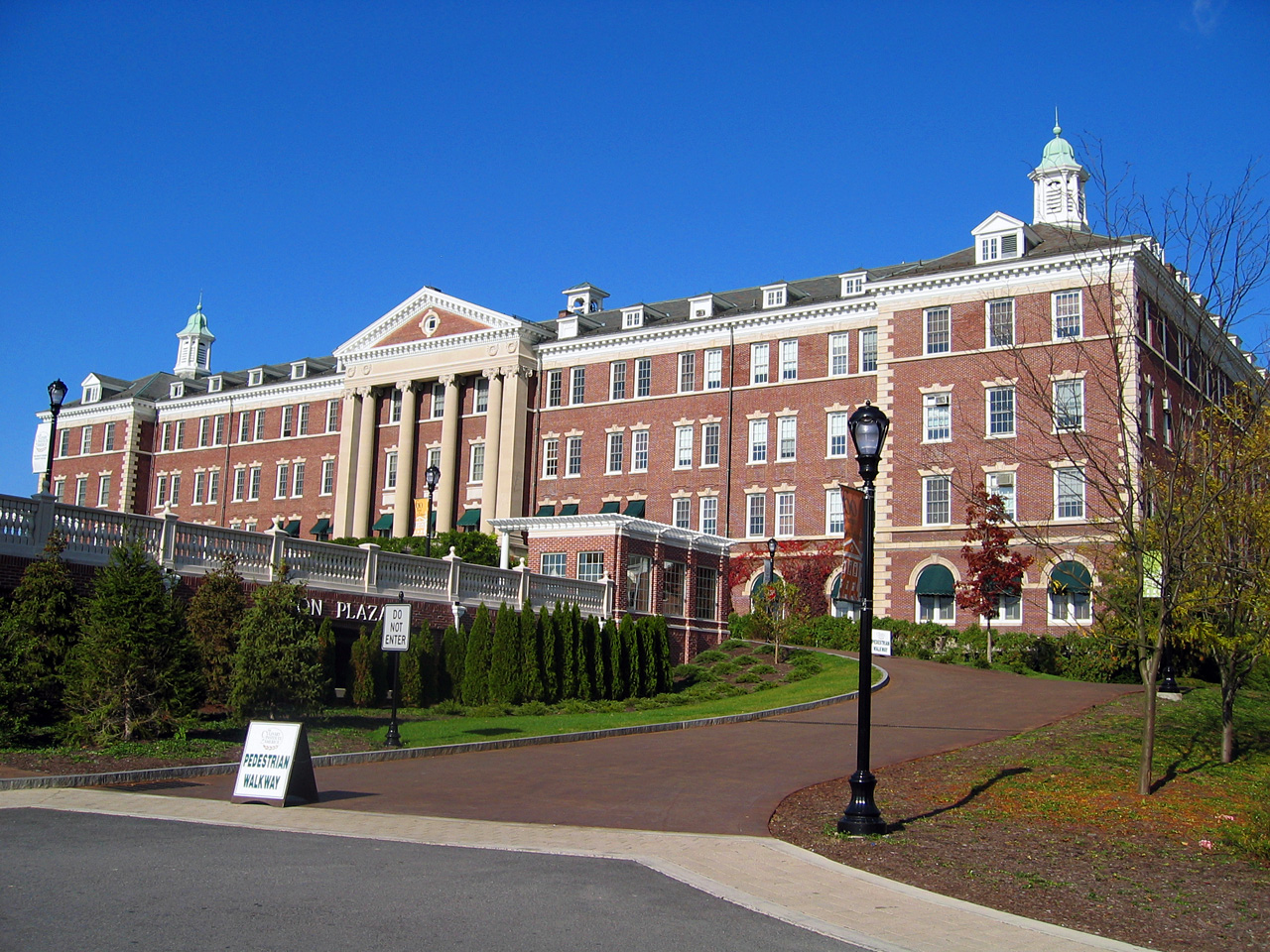
Roth Hall at the institute's Hyde Park campus, which was named after her.

On her time at the institute, she wrote:

I simply wanted to help out a few former associates and frankly I got on a merry-go-round and did not get off [illegible] for over 20 years. Remember I had never been in a commercial kitchen in my life - I knew good food - my mother was an expert in house cooking - and of course I had travelled the world and eaten in fine establishments - this was all I knew about the prep of food but many years of teaching and working with educators had given me a valuable background in the principles of good education - expert and dedicated faculty - respect for the manual worker - the right tools and facilities to work with - supervision by qualified personnel and depts of City and State.

In 1960, Craig Claiborne, writing in The New York Times, said of her that: "All of the world's great chefs have been men, but the one individual who has probably done more than any other to give fine cuisine a foothold in the United States is a woman. She is Mrs. Frances Roth, a kind and intelligent gem of a person, with a seemingly inexhaustible capacity for getting her own way."

Roth chose to retire in 1964. Jack Rosenthal became co-director in 1965 and succeeded her as director in June 1966. By that time in 1965 the school had 300 students. She consulted for the Office of Economic Opportunity and became the first woman inductee of the society Confrérie de la Chaîne des Rôtisseurs towards the end of her life. She died on June 20, 1971, at the age of 75.

== Personal life ==
She met Charles G. Roth at NYU Law School, and just before Charles left for World War I, they married in May 1917. They had two daughters: Bernice and Norma. Norma became a lawyer and passed the bar in 1944, making them the first mother and daughter to pass the Connecticut Bar. Roth's marriage was troubled; Charles aspired to a career in finance in New York and so was rarely at home. They later divorced.

=== Politics ===
Roth was an active Republican, advocating for the re-election of Herbert Hoover in 1932 at Republican meetings in Hartford and Barkhamsted. She supported Alf Landon's election in 1936 while she was chair of the New Haven Republican Women's Club and was against the enactment of Social Security. Campaigning for Dwight Eisenhower, she lauded him as someone "we can really depend upon and get behind" and was a Republican National Convention delegate in 1952.

== Bibliography ==
- Altschuler, Glenn C.; Blumin, Stuart M. (2009). The GI Bill: The New Deal for Veterans. Oxford University Press. ISBN 978-0195182286.
- Campbell-Schmitt, Adam (March 17, 2017). "How Two Women Founded the Culinary Institute of America". Food & Wine. Archived from the original on October 27, 2018.
- Claiborne, Craig (January 25, 1960). "Food News: From Court To Kitchen". The New York Times.
- Claiborne, Craig (January 28, 1971). "School Where Chefs Are Made". The New York Times.
- Cohn, Henry S. (April 2012). "Frances L. Roth: A Connecticut Trailblazer". Connecticut Lawyer. Vol. 22. Connecticut Bar Association. pp. 25–31. ISSN 1057-2384.
- Geraci, Victor William; Demers, Elizabeth S. (2011). Icons of American Cooking. ABC-CLIO. ISBN 978-0313381324.
- Marcus, Jacob Rader (September 1, 1994). Daniels, Judith M. (ed.). The Concise Dictionary of American Jewish Biography (PDF). Carslon Pub. ISBN 978-0926019744.
- Roth, Frances L. (April 13, 1933). "The Present Development of Psychiatric Technique in the Criminal Process". New England Journal of Medicine. 208 (15): 785–787. doi:10.1056/NEJM193304132081508.
- Smith, Andrew F. (2011). Eating History: 30 Turning Points in the Making of American Cuisine. Columbia University Press. ISBN 978-0231140935.
- "History of the CIA". The Culinary Institute of America. 2018.
