= John Doherty (chef) =

John Doherty (born c. 1958) is a prominent chef, who served as the executive chef of the Waldorf Astoria hotel in New York City for 23 years, leaving in 2009. He had served at the Waldorf for an entirety of 30 years, and became executive chef of the Waldorf in 1985 at the age of 27, the youngest person ever to be named to the position. He graduated from the Culinary Institute of America in 1978, where he was voted "most likely to succeed".

Doherty joined Brady Risk Management after parting ways with the Waldorf and has been a feature chef on the PBS show At The Chef's Table.

Doherty has offered his services to several food-based companies, including Chicken Soup for the Soul. He has also cooked for more presidents and world leaders than any other chef in history.

In 2015, he opened Black Barn Restaurant on East 26th Street in Manhattan. It is his first solo restaurant.

He has been awarded an honorary Doctorate degree from Johnson & Wales, an honorary master's degree from the Culinary Institute of America and a Leadership award from Niagara University as well as Food Arts Magazines' Silver Spoon Award.
