= Rajat Parr =

Indian-American sommelier and wine producer

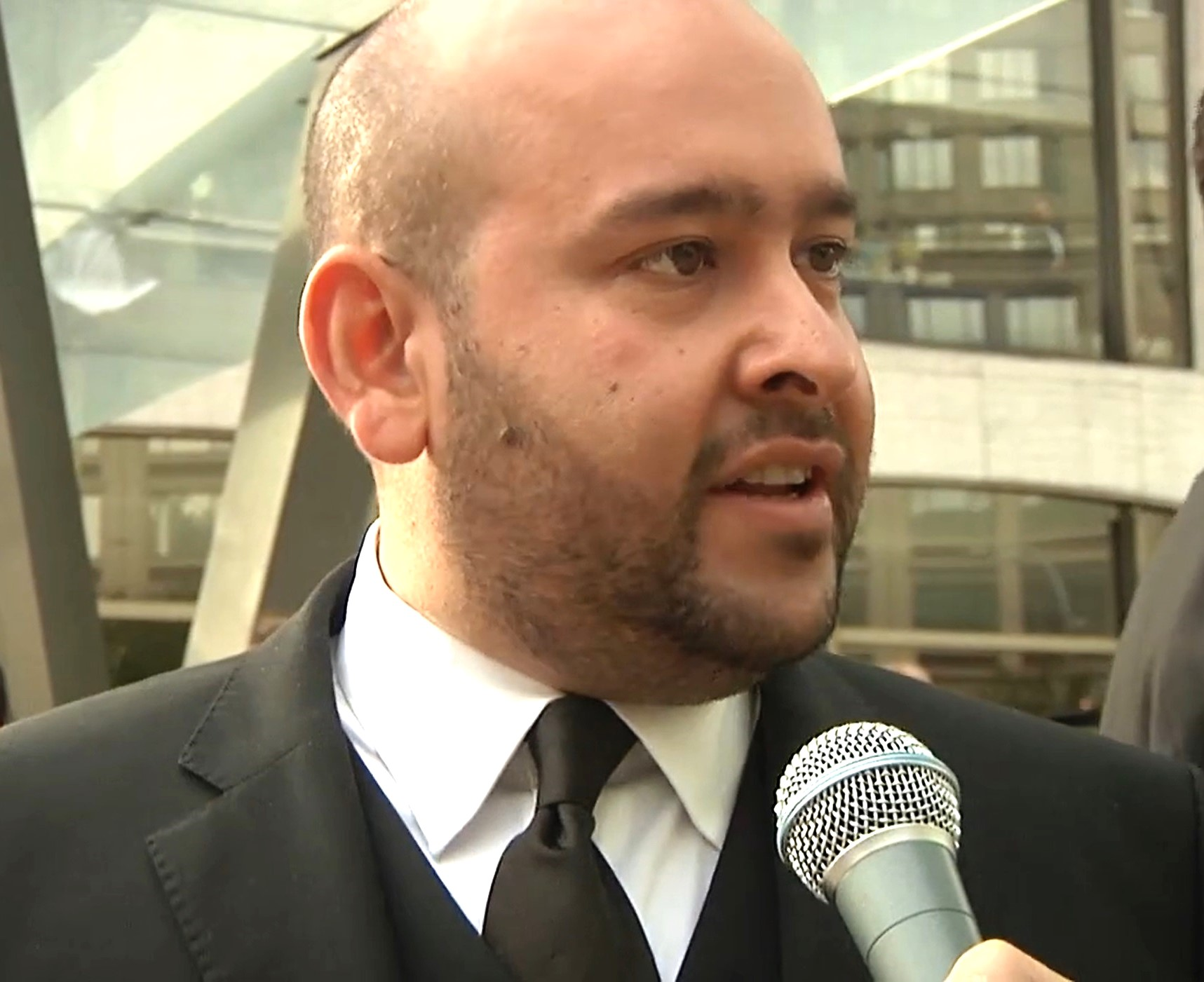
Parr interviewed at the James Beard Foundation Awards 2010

Rajat Parr is an Indian-American sommelier turned winemaker who oversaw the Michael Mina restaurant group's wine program before launching his own wineries in Oregon and the Central Coast of California. Sandhi is his label of purchased grapes while Lompoc, Domaine de la Cote, and Evening Land are productions from his and Sashi Moorman's (his business partner) vineyards. He mainly produces Pinot Noir and Chardonnay, biodynamically and organically. His winemaking philosophy is based on little to no manipulation of the final product through never inoculating nor over-ripening. His latest project is an urban winemaking facility in DTLA that he shares with fellow winemaker Abe Schoener.

== Early life and education ==
Parr was born and raised in Calcutta, India. He grew up close to his cousin, who ran two restaurants in New Delhi. Although he had read about wine, he had never tasted it (wine production and consumption in India is relatively limited) until age 20, in 1993, with an uncle living in London.

Parr graduated from the Welcomgroup Graduate School of Hotel Administration in Manipal, Karnataka, India. He graduated from the Culinary Institute of America in Hyde Park, New York, intending to become a chef and externed at the Raffles Hotel in Singapore.

== Career ==
Parr moved to San Francisco to become a food runner at Rubicon Restaurant, on encouragement from his wine instructor, after reading a magazine article about the restaurant's celebrity-sommelier Larry Stone. Parr, who visited vineyards on his days off to learn more about wine, impressed Stone with his persistence and determination. Within six months he became assistant to Stone, who became his mentor. After three years, Parr became sommelier of the Fifth Floor in San Francisco in 1999. In 2003 Parr was appointed wine director all of the Michael Mina restaurants throughout the United States.

In 2007 he, along with Michael Mina, were hired to develop and run a food and wine program by the developers of San Francisco's Millennium Tower, who called him "one of the most celebrated sommeliers in the world". The restaurant, RN74, had a $4.5 million budget and opened in May 2009 with an 84-page wine list. RN74 closed in October 2017.

In October 2010, Parr in collaboration with Jordan Mackay published Secrets of the Sommeliers, which won the 2011 James Beard Cookbook Award - Beverage Category. Parr and Mackay later co-authored The Sommelier's Atlas of Taste: A Field Guide to the Great Wines of Europe (ISBN 0399578234), released in October 2018.

== See also ==
- List of wine personalities
