= Betts House (Yale University) =

Coordinates: 41.32267°N 72.92214°W

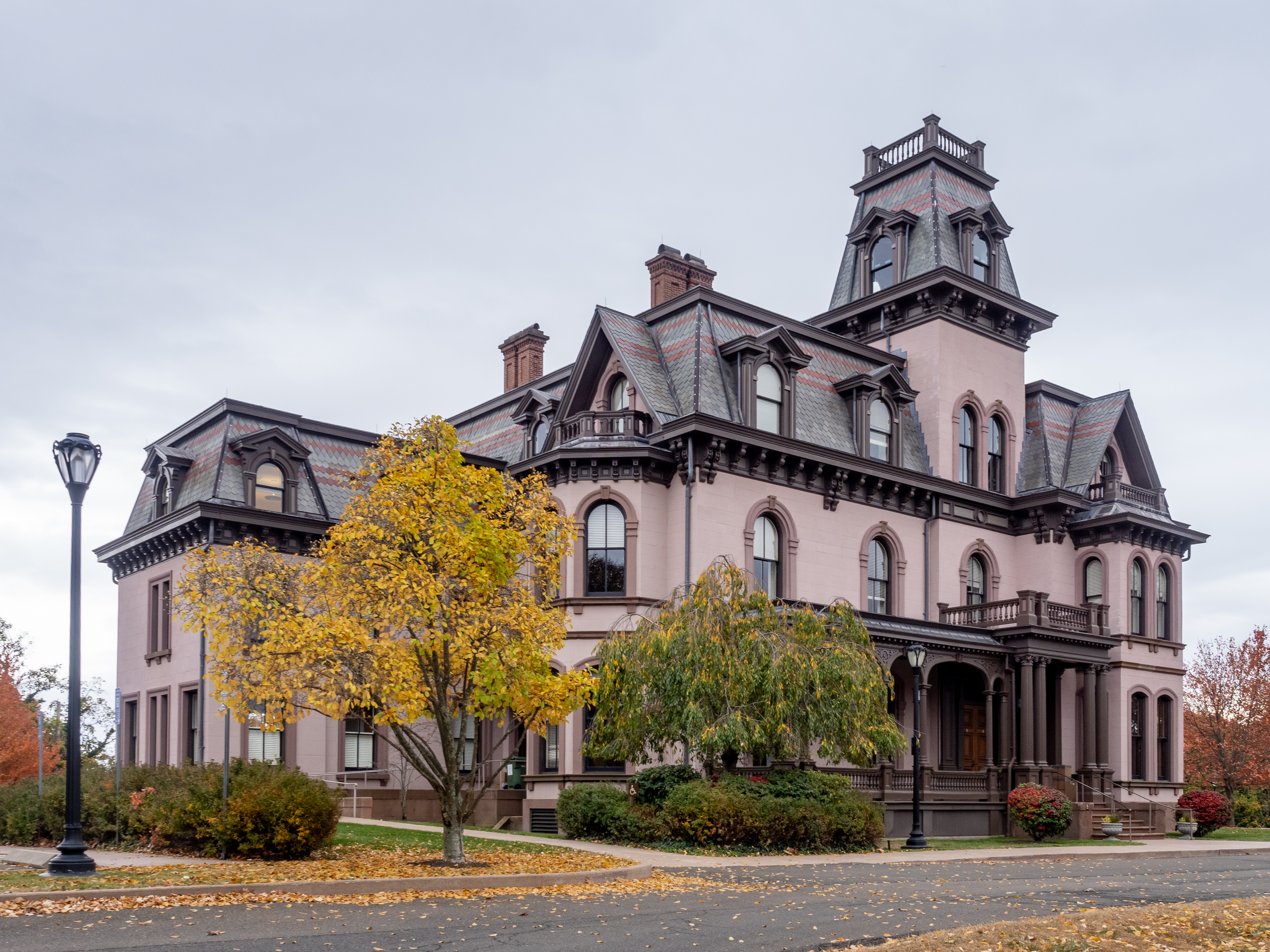
- Betts House from Prospect Street
- Interactive map of the Betts House area
- Former names: John M. Davies House; Angell Hall

General information
- Architectural style: French Second Empire
- Location: 393 Prospect Street, New Haven, Connecticut, United States
- Completed: 1868
- Renovated: 2002
- Renovation cost: US$14,000,000
- Client: John M. Davies
- Owner: Yale University

Technical details
- Floor count: 3
- Floor area: 21,899 sq ft (2,034.5 m^{2})
- Grounds: 7 acres (2.8 ha)

Design and construction
- Architect: Henry Austin (with David R. Brown)

Renovating team
- Renovating firm: Helpern Architects

Other information
- Number of rooms: 23

Betts House, also known as the John M. Davies House or Davies Mansion, is a mansion owned by Yale University in the Prospect Hill Historic District of New Haven, Connecticut. Completed in 1868 and designed by Henry Austin, it was sold to Yale in 1972 and is now home to the Yale Center for the Study of Globalization.

When built, the 21,000-square-foot (2,000 m^{2}) square foot mansion was the largest single-family home in New Haven. In 1947, it was converted into the home of the new Culinary Institute of America, but fell into disuse for four decades after being acquired by Yale. Considering it the best example of Second French Empire Revival architecture in the city, preservationists and students stopped the university from demolishing it in the 1990s. In 2002, the building was extensively renovated and put back into use.

== History ==
The earliest residences in the Prospect Hill neighborhood were built in the 1860s, when Oliver Winchester, Othneil Marsh, and John M. Davies all built mansions on the same block north of Edwards Street. Winchester, founder of the Winchester Repeating Arms Company located just down the hill, was the first to complete his mansion, an Italian villa designed by Henry Austin, which was later replaced by the Sterling Divinity Quadrangle. In 1867, Davies acquired seven acres to its south and commissioned Austin to design a second mansion at the highest point on the hill. An 1885 home was then completed to the mansion's south, later occupied by William Howard Taft after his term as President of the United States. When Davies died in 1871, the property passed to his wife, Alice, then to Thomas Wallace Jr. in 1911, who redecorated much of the interior.

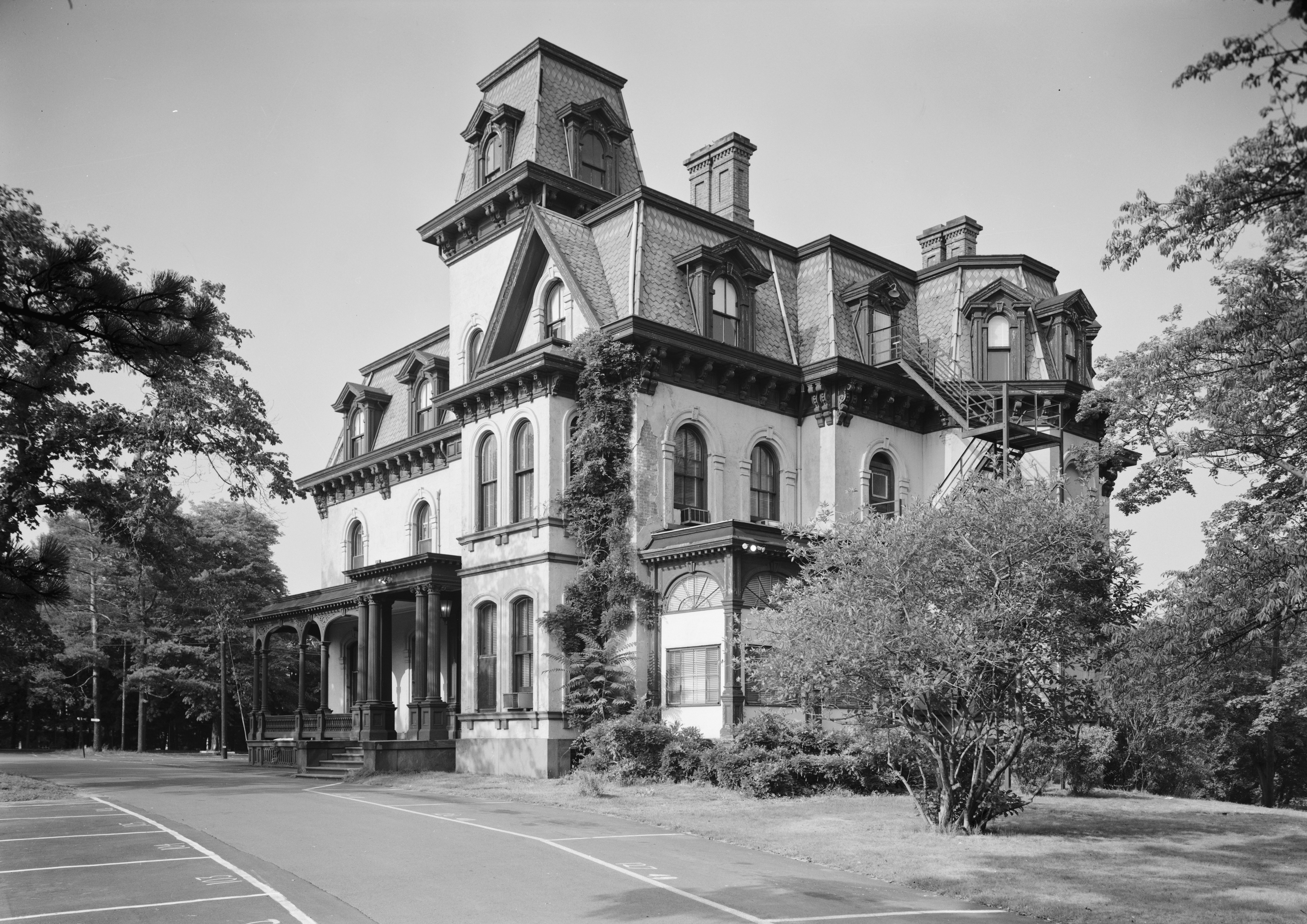
Davies House as the main building of the Culinary Institute of America in 1964

The Davies House became an academic building when Katharine Angell, wife of Yale President James Rowland Angell, helped establish the Culinary Institute of America in New Haven in 1946. With assistance from Angell and Yale University, the school purchased the Davies estate in 1947 as a facility for culinary instruction, and later purchased the adjoining Taft mansion. However, enrollment in the school quickly outgrew the buildings' capacity. When the institute departed for larger facilities in Hyde Park, New York, Yale acquired the building and grounds through right of first refusal.

After its purchase by Yale, the house remained vacant for nearly thirty years. Because of its high maintenance costs, university administrators proposed to demolish the mansion in 1980, but were rebuffed by students and preservationists who fought for its restoration, and the university instead accepted a developer's proposal to convert the mansion to an inn. These plans were never brought to fruition; Davies House was not restored, and some of its interior decor was looted. Already in disrepair, a 1990 fire destroyed much of the interior and upper stories. Although the property had been considered as a location for The Addams Family movie, the fire and university administrators' reluctance to allow access caused its producers to select a Los Angeles location instead.

In order to house international initiatives announced in its tercentennial year, Yale began a US$13.5 million renovation of the building in 2000. The university renamed the building after receiving a major gift towards the renovation from Roland Betts. In 2009, a conference center connected to Betts House via an enclosed arcade was completed, designed by the firm of Robert A. M. Stern.

== Building ==
Henry Austin, the primary architect for the building, is known for his revivalist mansions and public buildings in central New Haven and other New England towns. Betts House, one of his later works, is considered the best example of Second Empire architecture in New Haven.

The mansion is a three-story brick structure with a mansard roof and tower. Its massing was substantially similar to Austin's adjoining mansion for Oliver Winchester, though the buildings' interiors and ornamentation differed. The interior of the home was finished with black walnut and carved plaster ceilings, some of which were lost in the 1990 fire. In addition to its bedrooms and kitchen, the house had a library, parlor, dining room, drawing room, and billiard room, and sewing room, which were originally furnished in pinks, blues, and gold.

Interiors of Davies House
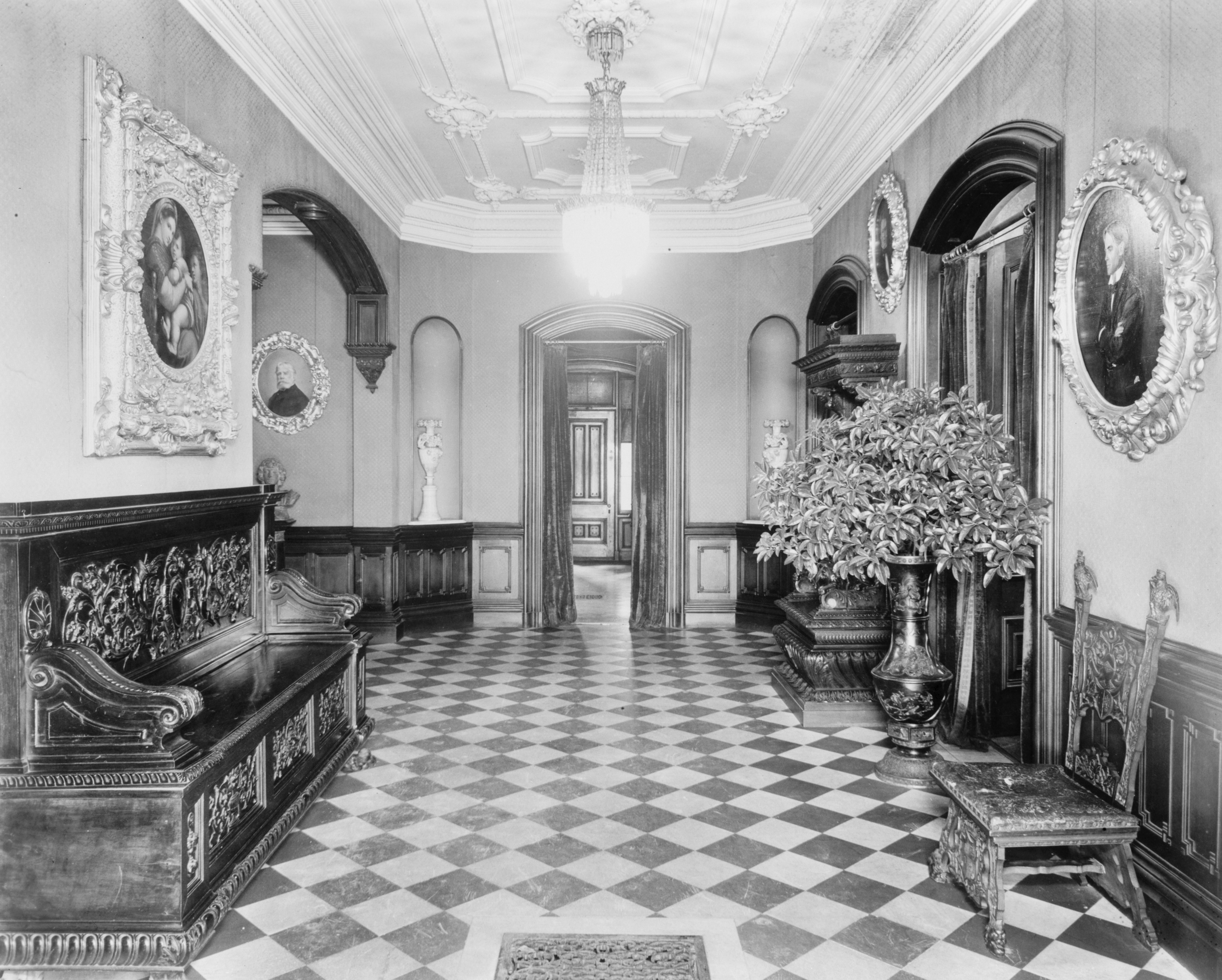
Entrance hall c. 1911

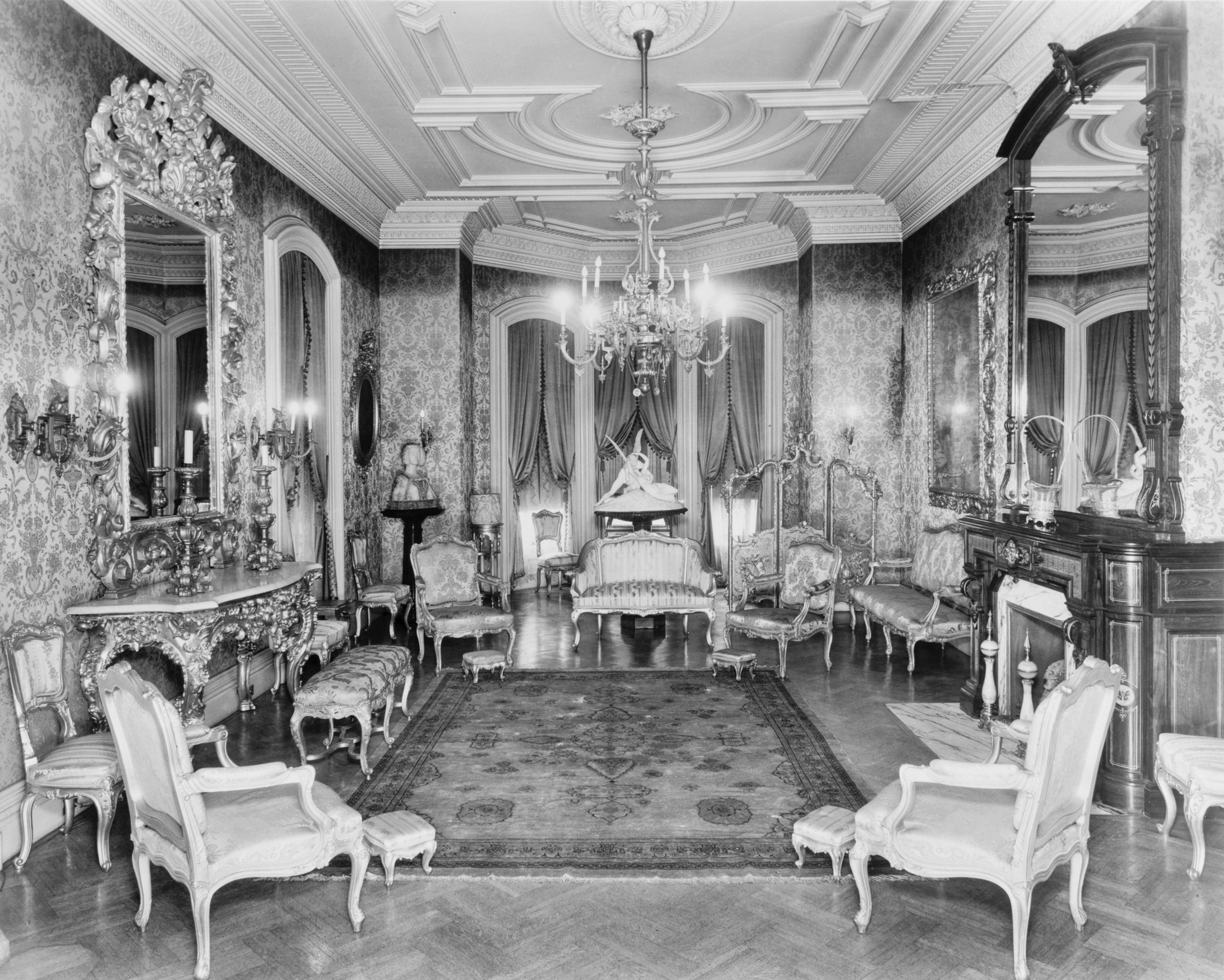
Drawing room, c. 1911

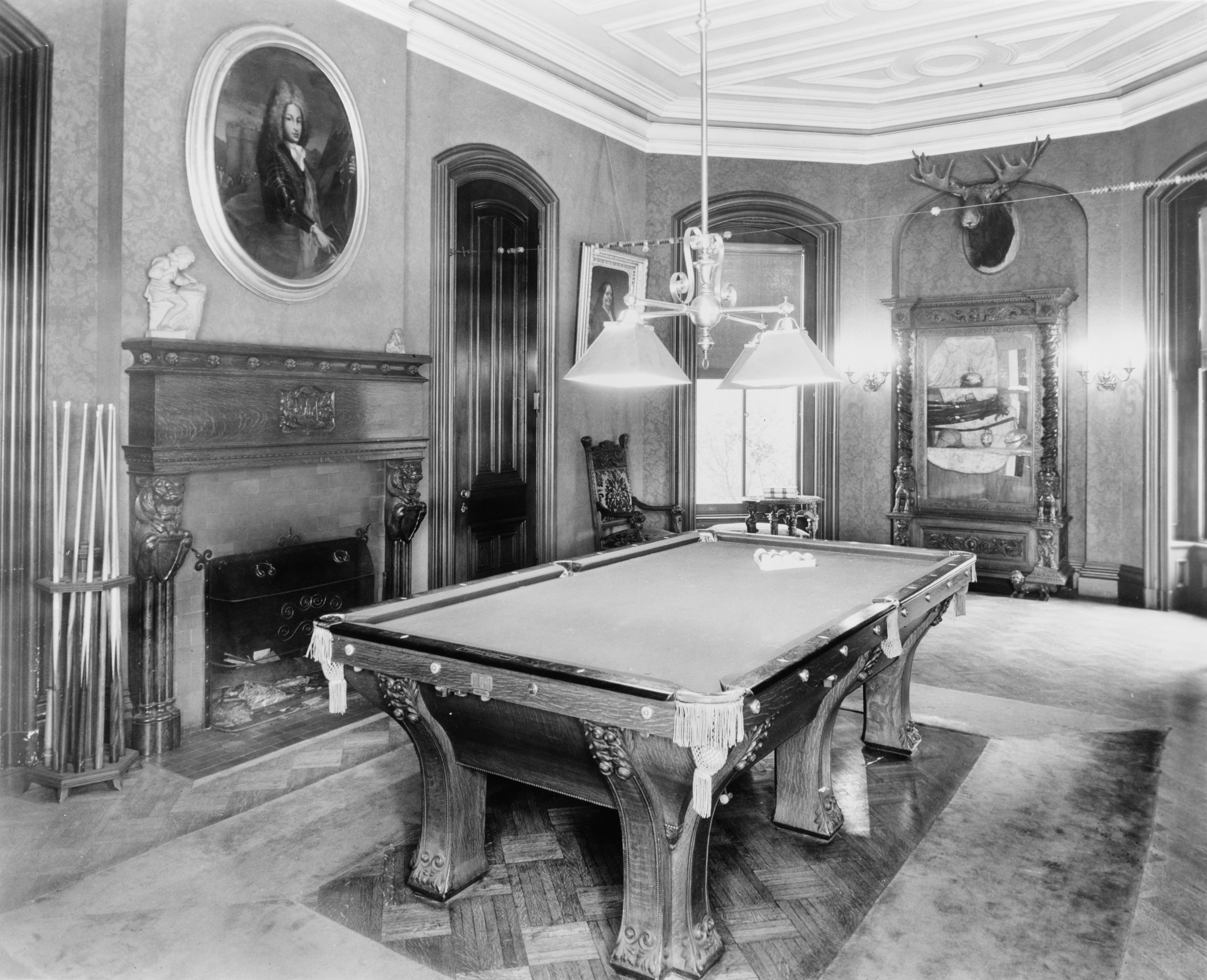
Billiard room, c. 1911

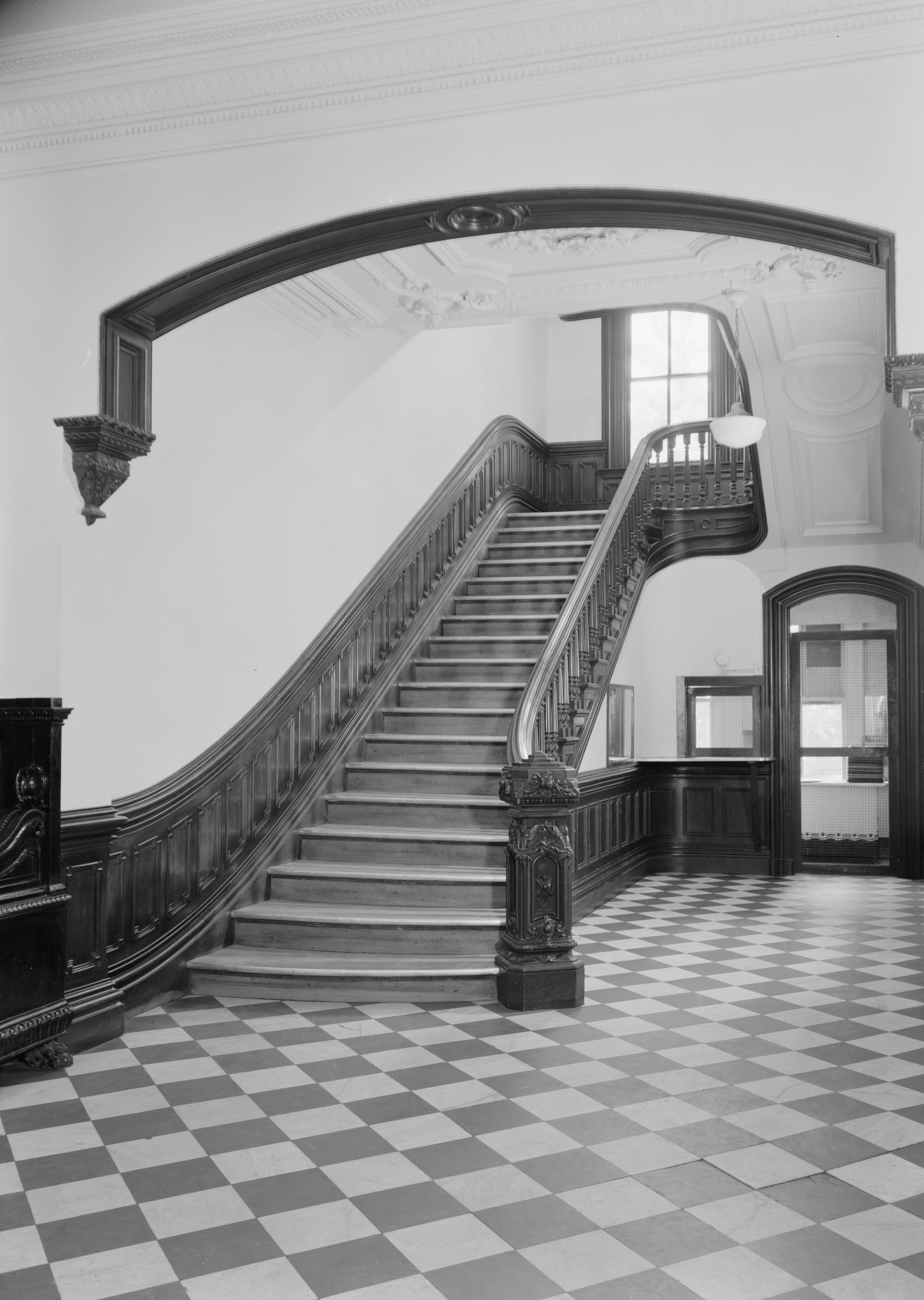
Main stair, 1964
