= Yale Center for the Study of Globalization =

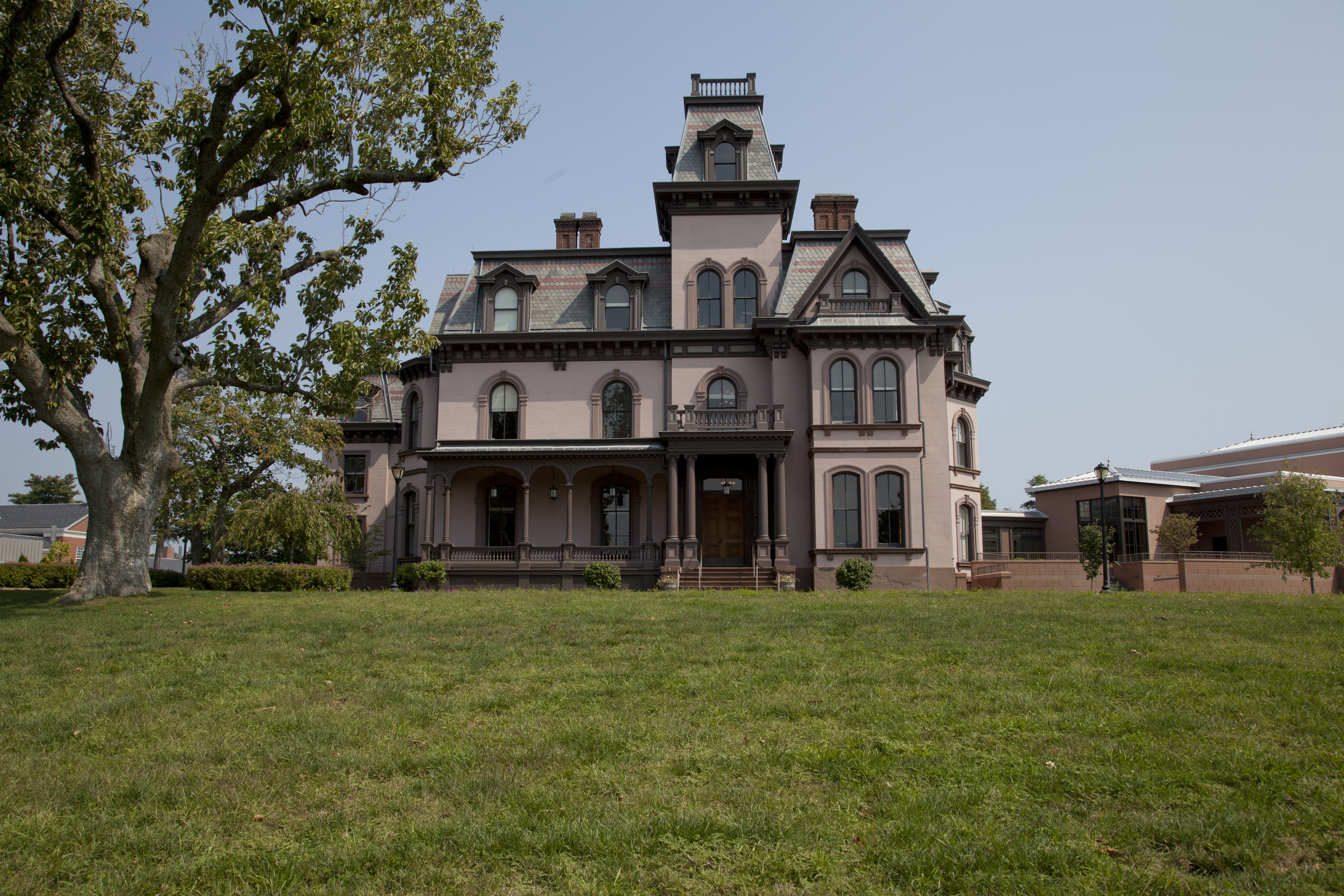
- The center's offices are located in Betts House
- Abbreviation: YCSG
- Formation: 2001
- Type: Research center
- Director: Ernesto Zedillo
- Website: www.ycsg.yale.edu

The Yale Center for the Study of Globalization, or YCSG, is a research center at Yale University at New Haven, Connecticut. It was established in 2001 in order to "enrich the debate about globalization on campus and to promote the flow of ideas between Yale and the policy world".

The current director is Ernesto Zedillo, president of Mexico from 1994 to 2000. Its current sponsors include William Henry Draper III, the William and Flora Hewlett Foundation, and the John D. and Catherine T. MacArthur Foundation. The program's main offices are located in Betts House, a university-owned mansion in the Prospect Hill Historic District.

From 2001 to 2013, the organization published YaleGlobal Online, an online magazine that explores globalization and implications of growing global interconnectedness in economics, security, trade, politics and the environment. Since 2013, the MacMillan Center at Yale has published YaleGlobal.
