= L. Timothy Ryan =

American chef

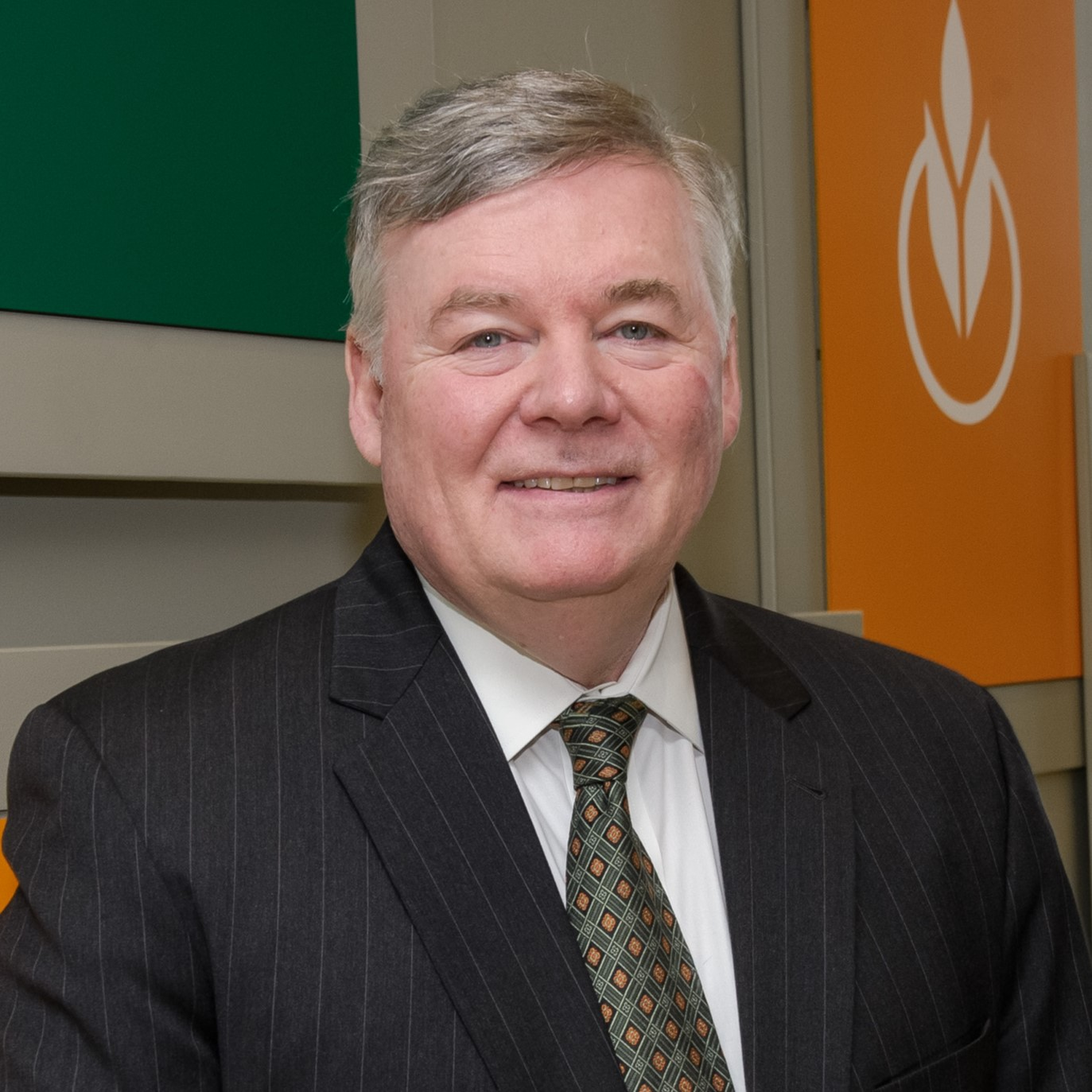
- Ryan in 2023

5th President of The Culinary Institute of America
- Incumbent
- Assumed office November 1, 2001

Personal details
- Born: Lawrence Timothy Ryan; January 16, 1958 (age 68) Pittsburgh, Pennsylvania, U.S.
- Education: Culinary Institute of America (AA); University of New Haven (BS, MBA); University of Pennsylvania (EdD)

Lawrence Timothy Ryan (born January 16, 1958) is an American chef and was the fifth president of the Culinary Institute of America (CIA) from 2001 to 2024. Ryan, a certified master chef, graduated from the CIA in 1977 and joined the school's faculty in 1982, and later moved to administration before heading the education division. In 2001, he became the first CIA alumnus and faculty member to become president of the college. Prior to returning to the CIA as a faculty member, he spent five years as a chef in different aspects of the culinary industry.

== Early life and education ==
Tim Ryan was born in Pittsburgh, Pennsylvania, on January 16, 1958. At age 13, he began work as a dishwasher at a restaurant there. By the time he went to high school, he had decided he wanted to be a chef and enrolled at the Culinary Institute of America. Following graduation with an Associate of Occupational Studies degree, he worked as assistant chef at a restaurant in Irwin, Pennsylvania and then as executive chef at La Normande in Pittsburgh. Ryan also attained a Bachelor of Science and Master of Business Administration from the University of New Haven. He earned a Doctor of Education (EdD) from the University of Pennsylvania.

== Career ==
Ryan also traveled to France to gain experience in several French restaurants. While in France, he was approached by the CIA to join the faculty, and returned to the school as a chef-instructor in 1982. Later that year, he became part of the team that developed the school's American Bounty Restaurant. He worked his way up through the ranks at the college serving a number of roles, including department head for culinary education, director of culinary education, vice president of education, and executive vice president.

=== President of CIA ===
In 2001, the school's president Ferdinand Metz stepped down to become president emeritus. After searching to fill the vacancy, the college's board of trustees elected Tim Ryan from a group of finalists at its meeting in New York City on October 11, 2001. On November 1, 2001, Ryan began his tenure as the fifth president of the college.

Highlights of Ryan's presidency include expansion of student housing facilities and a new admissions center on the Hyde Park campus, the launch of associate degree programs at the school's California campus, and the 2008 opening of the college's second branch campus, the Culinary Institute of America, San Antonio.

On April 23, 2008, the school faculty voted no confidence in his presidency, by a vote of 85 to 9. The board subsequently unanimously confirmed their confidence in him and extended his contract.

=== Honors, awards, and affiliations ===
In 2010, Ryan was inducted into the James Beard Foundation's Who's Who of Food and Beverage in America, a group that the foundation lists as the most accomplished food and beverage workers in the United States. He was also presented with a Lifetime Achievement Award from Foodservice Educators Network International in 2012, and the UCLA Extension presented him with its 2013 Innovation Award. In 2014, Ryan was named one of the 50 most powerful people in the restaurant industry on the Nation's Restaurant News Power List.

He is a member of the American Culinary Federation, a past member and chairman of the National Culinary Review, and an editorial advisory committee member for Cheers, Seafood Business, and Take Out Business magazines. He also has served as keynote speaker at a number of industry events, including the 2009 International Foodservice Congress in Madrid, Spain and the 2010 Center for the Advancement of Foodservice Education Leadership Conference.
