= Mike Colameco =

American chef (born 1957)

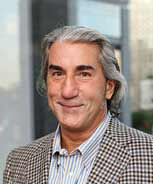
Michael Colameco, chef, author, host of Real Food on PBS and Food Talk on Heritage Radio Network

Michael Colameco (born 1957) is an American chef, author, and media personality. A 45-year veteran of the restaurant industry, he is the host and producer for Mike Colameco's Real Food television show, retooled from the original 3-part series "The Food Dude". Since 2006, he has hosted a live weekly radio show called Food Talk. Colameco is a long time contributor to Saveur, Edible Manhattan, Edible New Jersey, Snooth, and Guitar Aficionado magazines and in 2009, he published Mike Colameco's Food Lover's Guide to New York City with Houghton Mifflin Harcourt.

== Career ==
Chef

Colameco began working in the restaurant industry as a busboy at the age of 13 and he is a graduate of the Culinary Institute of America in Hyde Park, New York. Early mentors include chef Seppi Renggli of the Four Seasons Restaurant, where Colameco worked as a line cook and chef Christian Delouvrier at The Maurice, where he worked as a sous chef. Colameco has worked as a chef for numerous New York City-based restaurants, including the legendary Tavern on the Green, Windows on the World, and The Ritz Carlton Hotel. Taking the helm of his own restaurant, he was chef/owner of the seasonally-focused, The Globe restaurant, near his home based in Cape May, New Jersey.

Importer

After selling his restaurant in 1993, Colameco worked as an import food broker and founder of MECO Trading through 2002. As a consultant for US importers of record, he has worked with overseas food manufacturers, mostly in China as a sourcing supplier for US-based Importer Distributors.

Television & Radio Host

Colameco's popular long-running TV series, Mike Colameco's Real Food, is a pioneer in food television. Shot documentary-style, the show provides a backstage look at how the most influential people in today's restaurant scene transform the way we think about food. Featured chefs include Daniel Boulud, Thomas Keller, Gabrielle Hamilton, Dan Barber, Alice Waters, Eric Ripert, Alain Ducasse, April Bloomfield and countless other industry taste makers. Mike Colameco's Real Food has been on the air since 2000 via New York's flagship PBS affiliate, WNET, as well as NJTV. In 2014, the show was picked up for national distribution and airs year-round on the CREATE TV Channel. He is the host and the producer of the show.

Food Talk with Michael Colameco is a weekly one-hour radio show and podcast produced by the Heritage Radio Network. Each hour is a stand-alone multi-themed program featuring live interviews with a myriad of guests including chefs, restaurateurs, cookbook authors and food writers. Discussions cover a wide range of topics including ingredient sourcing, cooking, baking, wine, equipment, mixology, beer, farming, foraging, fisheries, sustainability, chocolate, food trends, travel, diet, health, music and his take on the many restaurants he frequents.

Food Talk has been on the air since the mid-1990s, founded by the long-time host New York's Food Maven, Arthur Schwartz. A live show airing six days a week on WOR 710, Colameco became the host in 2006, replacing short runs by Tyler Florence in 2005 and Rocco DiSpirito in 2004. Following a change in programming at WOR, Food Talk with Michael Colameco has been airing weekly via the Heritage Radio Network.

Book

Mike Colameco's Food Lover's Guide to New York City by John Wiley & Sons

Awards

Mousquetaire d' Armagnac, 2003

Compagnon du Beaujolais, 2006

== Fitness ==
An avid sportsman, from 1985 to 1991, Colameco fought for the New York Athletic Club amateur boxing team and at various times, was the NYAC Middleweight and Light Heavyweight Boxing Champion. Prior to that, he was a paid sparring partner for boxers Chris Reid, Kevin Moley, and Donny LaLonde.

In 1986, Colameco earned his Black Belt in Kyokushin Karate, and since then, he has completed five New York City Marathons. An avid open water ocean swimmer, in 2014 his New York Athletic Club 3-man relay team finished 2nd in the men's open division in the FKCC 12.5 mile relay, completing the course in 5 hours 26 minutes.

== Personal life ==
Colameco is Italian-American. He divides his time between homes on the Lower East Side in Manhattan and Cape May. Colameco is married to Heijung Park-Colameco, a real estate agent and native of South Korea. The couple has two sons.
