= Snack Wrap =

McDonald's menu item

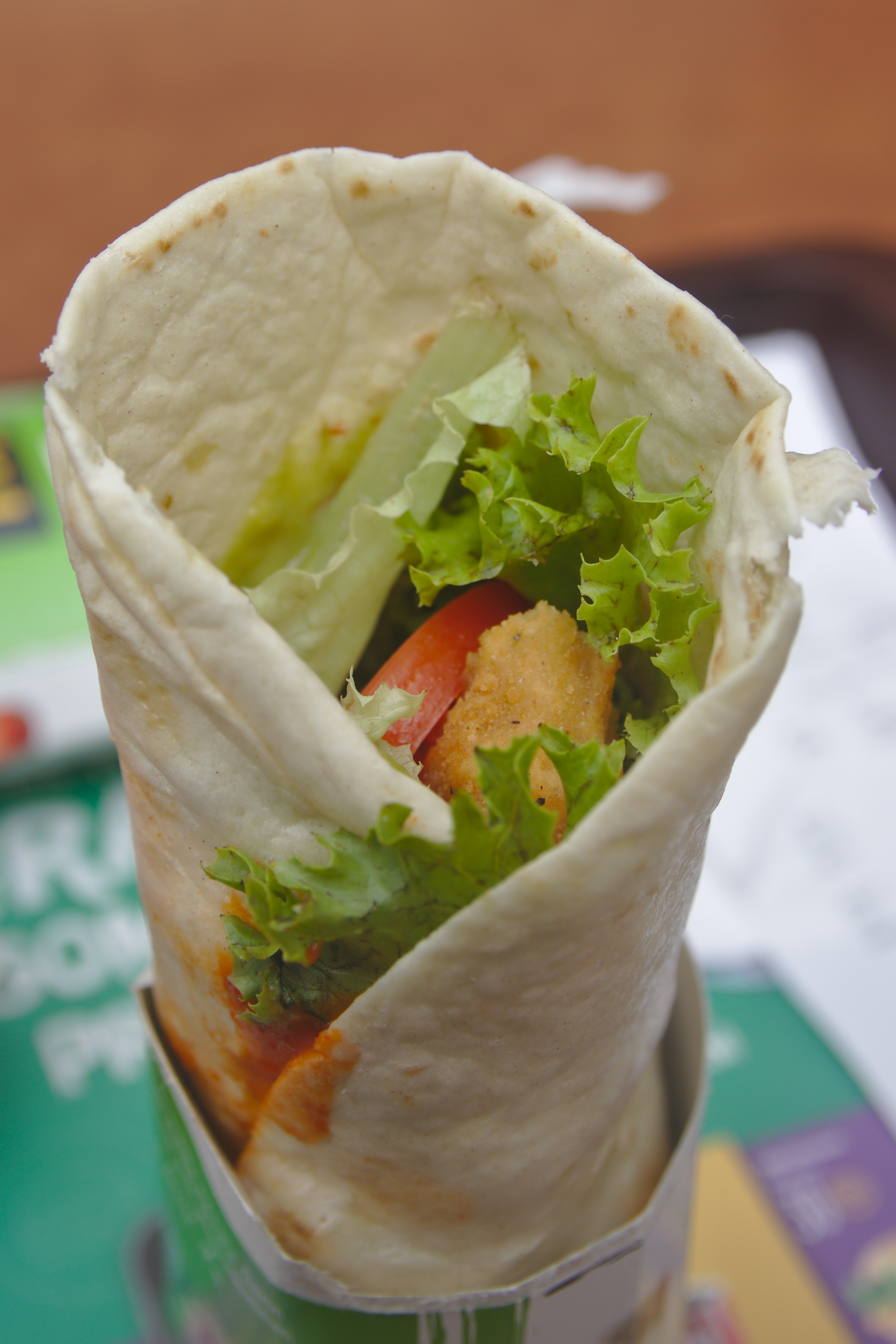
- McDonald's Tomato Salsa Crispy Chicken Wrap in Austria
- Alternative names: McCrispy Snack Wrap
- Type: McDonald's
- Place of origin: Poland
- Invented: 2004

The Snack Wrap is a menu item available at McDonald's in the United States, Canada, Europe and Australia. It consists of 100% white meat chicken breast (crispy or grilled), lettuce, shredded cheddar jack cheese, Monterey Jack cheese, and sauce (ranch, honey mustard or salsa roja), wrapped in a soft flour tortilla. It was created to serve as a snack to satisfy hunger between meals. A similar product called "Big Flavour Wraps" is offered in McDonald's in the United Kingdom.

== History ==
=== Concept ===
The concept of a McDonald's Snack Wrap originated and debuted in Poland in 2004. It was officially launched in the United States in 2006, and was initially only available with crispy chicken and ranch sauce. In early 2007, the option to substitute for grilled chicken and/or honey mustard sauce were made available. In some markets, salsa roja or Chipotle BBQ is also available.

The Snack Wrap was developed as an attempt to create a new chicken item appealing to drive-through customers. The original wrap used the same meat as the Chicken Selects, allowing restaurants to cook batches of the chicken more frequently and provide a fresher product to customers. The menu item was also introduced in order to take advantage of the growing demand for "snack-size", or smaller portion options.

=== Discontinued in the US ===
In 2016, the Snack Wrap was officially discontinued in the United States as a result of underwhelming sales and time-consuming construction, though individual franchises could still choose to sell them. However, as a result of menu simplification in 2020 due to the COVID-19 pandemic, the Snack Wrap was removed nationwide.

A video posted to TikTok on April 7, 2022, showed a promotion for the Honey Mustard Snack Wrap, leading to the belief that the item was returning to stores in the United States on later that year. It was later proven to be a hoax.

=== Return in the US ===
In December 2023, it was reported that the wrap would return in 2025 under a new name of "McCrispy Snack Wrap" as part of the McCrispy products. Later, on April 15, 2025, McDonald's tweeted that the Snack Wrap would return on an unspecified date, "0x.14.2025". On June 3, 2025, McDonald's revealed that the Snack Wrap would return on July 10, 2025 with 2 different versions, Spicy or Ranch.

=== Similar products ===
In the United Kingdom, a similar product called "Big Flavour Wraps" is offered including flavours such as sweet chilli chicken.

== Nutrition information ==
Snack Wrap (with crispy chicken and ranch sauce)
Nutritional value per 1 wrap (110-132 g)
- Energy: 330 kcal (1,400 kJ)
- Carbohydrates: 33 g
- Fat: 16 g
- Saturated: 9 g
- Trans: 2 g
- Protein: 14 g
Vitamins and minerals
Minerals	Quantity %DV^{†}
Sodium	34% 780 mg
- Other constituents: Quantity
- Cholesterol: 35 mg
- ^{†}Percentages estimated using US recommendations for adults.

A Snack Wrap with crispy chicken and ranch sauce contains 330 calories (1,380 kJ), 16 grams of fat, 2 grams of trans fat, 35 milligrams of cholesterol, 780 milligrams of sodium, 33 grams of carbohydrates, and 14 grams of protein.

Snack Wrap (grilled chicken with honey mustard or barbecue)
Nutritional value per 1 wrap (110-132 g)
- Energy: 250 kcal (1,000 kJ)
- ^{†}Percentages estimated using US recommendations for adults.

A Snack Wrap that includes grilled chicken with honey mustard or barbecue contains 250 calories.
