= Connecticut Bar Association =

Voluntary bar association for Connecticut, US

The Connecticut State Bar Association
- Type: Legal Society
- Headquarters: New Britain, CT
- Location: United States
- Members: 6,500+ in 2012
- Website: http://www.ctbar.org

The Connecticut Bar Association (CBA; formerly the Connecticut State Bar Association) is a voluntary bar association for the state of Connecticut.

== History ==
The CBA was founded on June 2, 1875.

In 1878, members of CBA met in Saratoga Springs, New York, to lead in founding the national bar association; out of this grew the American Bar Association.

The Connecticut Bar Association is governed by a Board of Governors, an administrative board with responsibility for budgetary and financial matters other than setting annual dues, and a House of Delegates, its primary decision-making and policy-making body. Seven offices, held by members of the Association for one-year terms, include president, immediate past president, president-elect, vice president, secretary, treasurer, and assistant secretary-treasurer.

CBA does not regulate admission to the practice of law in Connecticut; that is the function of the Connecticut Bar Examining Committee of the Connecticut Judicial Branch.
