= The Culinary Institute of America =

American private culinary school

- Former names: New Haven Restaurant Institute (1946–1947); Restaurant Institute of Connecticut (1947–1951)
- Type: Private culinary school
- Established: May 22, 1946; 80 years ago
- Founders: Frances Roth, Katharine Angell
- Accreditation: MSCHE
- Endowment: $172.3 million (2025)
- Chairman: John C. Metz Jr.
- Chancellor: L. Timothy Ryan
- President: Michiel Bakker
- Provost: Mark Erickson
- Academic staff: 138 FT/ 74 PT
- Students: 3,147 (Fall 2024)
- Undergraduates: 3,011 (Fall 2024)
- Postgraduates: 145 (Fall 2024)
- Location: Hyde Park, New York, United States; 41°44′45″N 73°56′00″W
- Colors: Sage Green and Fire Gold
- Nickname: Steels
- Sporting affiliations: HVIAC
- Mascot: Sting
- Website: www.ciachef.edu

The Culinary Institute of America (CIA) is a private culinary school with its main campus in Hyde Park, New York, and branch campuses in St. Helena and Napa, California; San Antonio, Texas; and Singapore. The college, which was the first to teach culinary arts in the United States, offers associate, bachelor's, and master's degrees, and has the largest staff of American Culinary Federation Certified Master Chefs. The CIA also offers continuing education for professionals in the hospitality industry as well as conferences and consulting services. The college additionally offers recreational classes for non-professionals. The college operates student-run restaurants on its four U.S. campuses.

The school was founded in 1946 in New Haven, Connecticut, as a vocational institute for returning veterans of World War II. With a growing student body, the school purchased a former Catholic novitiate in Hyde Park in 1970, which remains its central campus. The school began awarding associate degrees in 1971, bachelor's degrees in 1993, and master's degrees in 2018. Additional campuses were opened in the following years: St. Helena in 1995, Texas in 2008, Singapore in 2010, and Napa in 2016.

== History ==
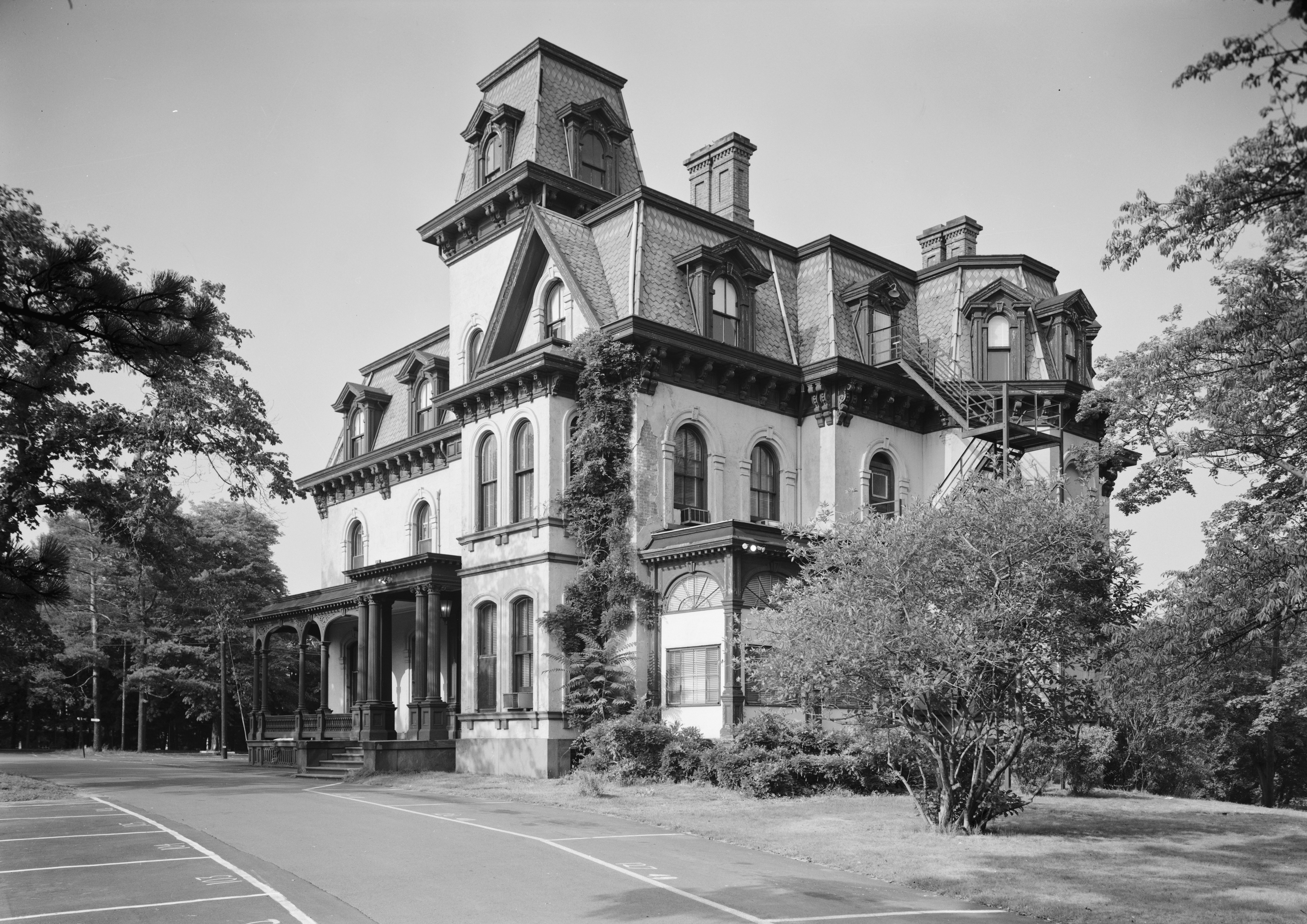
The Davies Mansion in 1964, during its use by the CIA

The New Haven Restaurant Institute was founded by New Haven attorney Frances Roth and Katharine Angell on May 22, 1946 in New Haven, Connecticut as a vocational training school for returning World War II veterans. It was the first culinary college in the United States. With assistance from Yale University, the school purchased the Davies mansion in New Haven's Prospect Hill neighborhood. The first class consisted of sixteen students and the faculty included a dietitian, a baker, and a chef. In 1947 the school was renamed the Restaurant Institute of Connecticut to reflect its growing repute; the school's name was changed again to the Culinary Institute of America in 1951.

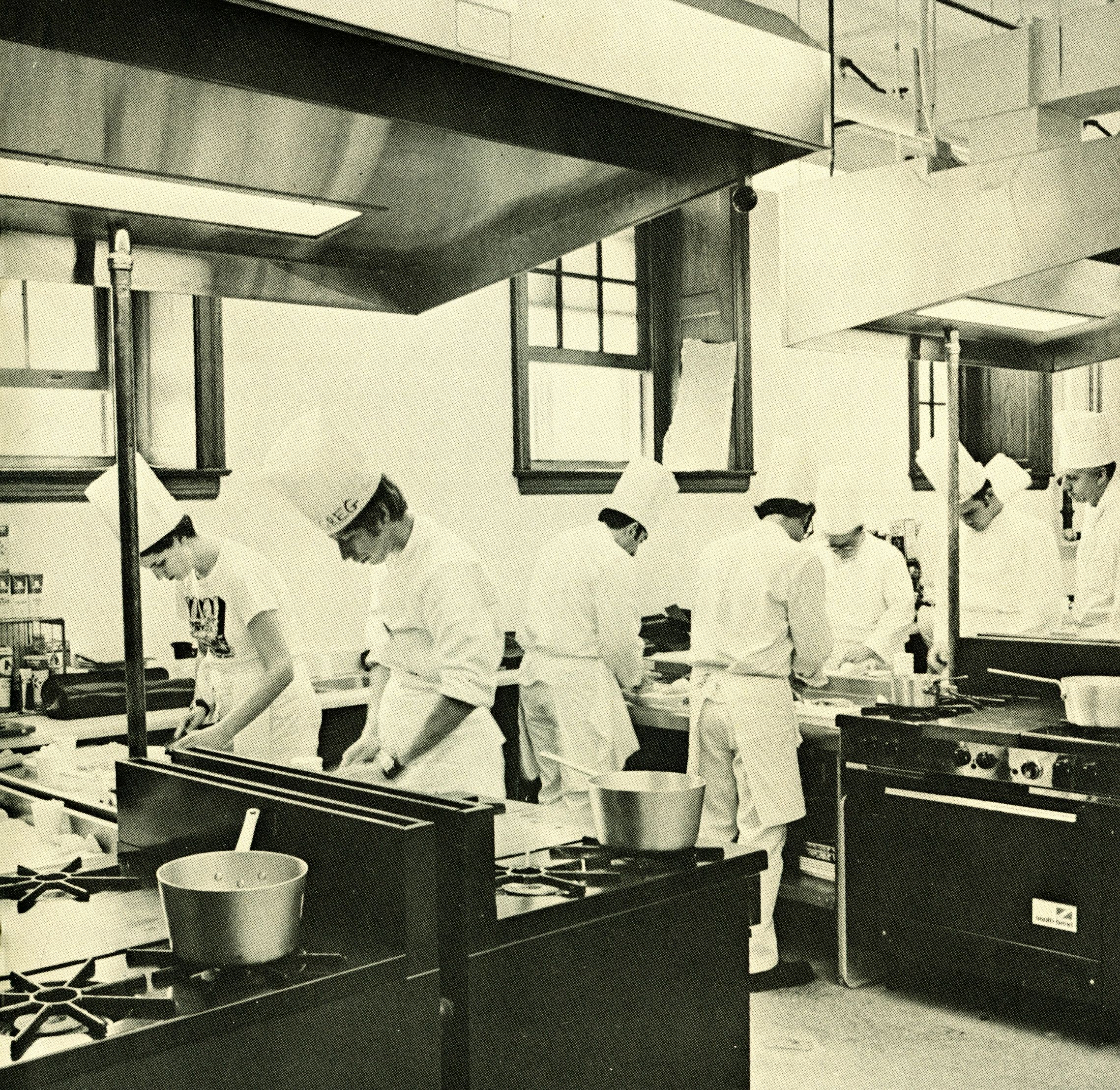
CIA students in 1974

Enrollment grew to approximately 1,000 students by 1969, beyond the capacity of its original campus, so the school purchased the St. Andrew-on-Hudson Jesuit novitiate in Hyde Park, New York in 1970. In 1971, the college began awarding associate degrees, and opened its doors in Hyde Park in the following year. From 1974 to 1979, the school built three residence halls, a culinary library, a career planning center, and a learning resources center. From 1982 to 1984, the American Bounty and Caterina de' Medici Restaurants and St. Andrew's Café opened. In 1984, the school's continuing education center (later named the J. Willard Marriott Education Center) opened, and the school improved its teaching kitchens and constructed an experimental kitchen and food laboratory. In 1990, the school opened a baking and pastry facility, named two years later as the Shunsuke Takaki School of Baking and Pastry. In 1993, the school opened its Conrad N. Hilton Library and began offering bachelor's degree programs. In 1995, the school's first branch campus opened, the Culinary Institute of America at Greystone in St. Helena, California. In 1998, the Student Recreation Center was opened.

Roth Hall, the primary facility at the school's Hyde Park campus

The Apple Pie Bakery Café opened in 2000, and the Colavita Center opened the following year. More residence halls were built at the school's Hyde Park campus in 2004. In 2005, Anton Plaza opened in Hyde Park while the Ventura Center for Menu Research and Development opened in St. Helena. On April 23, 2008, the school's teachers' union approved a vote of no confidence regarding CIA president Tim Ryan, the result was 85 to 9 against him. A thirteen-item list of complaints included outdated technology, poor-quality classes, and bad dining hall meals. Ryan later met with union representatives and described coming improvements in scheduling and curriculum. Immediately after the faculty's vote of no confidence, the board of trustees unanimously voted in support of Ryan and extended his contract. In the course of the controversy, the school prevented the campus newspaper, La Papillote, from writing about the issue, which prompted its editor to resign. Administrators later apologized and reportedly allowed a full report in the paper's next issue.

The school's third campus opened in 2008 in San Antonio. Two years later, the CIA opened a campus in Singapore consisting of a facility on the campus of Temasek Polytechnic. In 2012, the CIA began offering a bachelor's degree program in culinary science, and in 2014 introduced a bachelor's degree in applied food studies. In the same year, the college acquired a portion of Copia, a museum in downtown Napa, California that operated from 2001 to 2008. In 2016, the college opened a campus, the Culinary Institute of America at Copia, which houses the CIA's new Food Business School. The college, which was outgrowing its St. Helena campus, purchased the northern portion of the Copia property for $12.5 million. The following year, CIA began offering electives focused on food photography and food styling in response to the growing popularity of food photography on social media platforms and increased competition for jobs. It also launched a Bachelor of Business Administration in Food Business Management in 2016 and a Bachelor of Science degree program in Hospitality Management in 2017. In February 2020, it announced its online Bachelor of Business Administration (BBA) in Food Business Leadership program.

The college introduced master's-level education with a Master of Professional Studies degree program in Food Business in 2018 and Wine and Beverage Management in 2019. In 2023 it began offering an online Sustainable Food Systems master's program and master's degrees in Culinary Arts. The culinary arts master's program is based at the school's Hyde Park campus and includes courses on business administration and product sourcing, as well as in-person residencies. Residency locations include Michelin star-rated restaurants The French Laundry, SingleThread, and Californios, as well as with Dom Pérignon in the Champagne wine region. In 2024, the CIA and Kapiʻolani Community College announced a partnership to create a workforce development program in the University of Hawaiʻi system. In January 2025, a Culinary Therapeutics master's program was announced, which applies culinary arts strategies to promoting health and well-being.

== Campuses ==
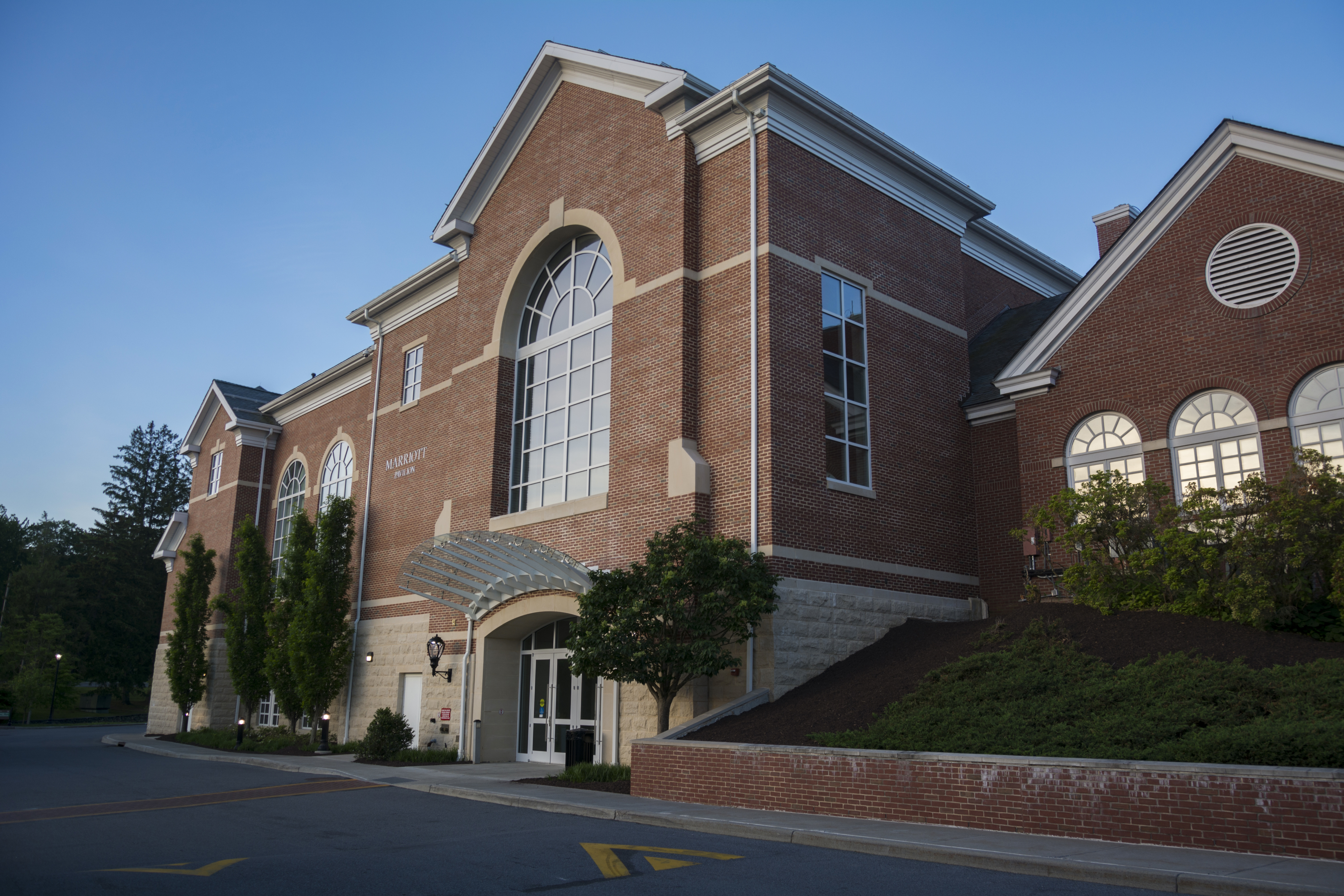
The Marriott Pavilion, behind Roth Hall

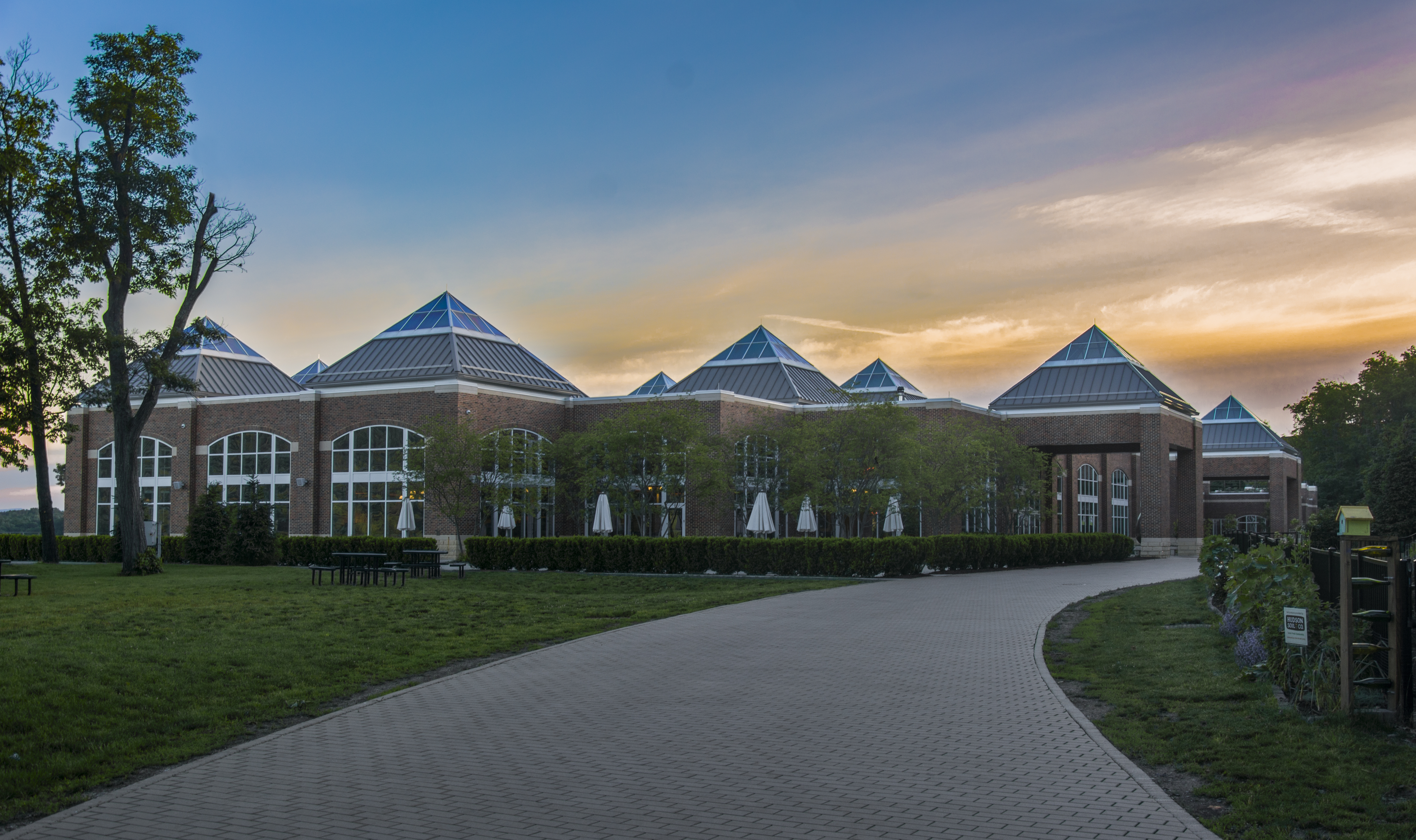
Student Commons

=== Hyde Park, New York ===
The school's largest and primary campus operates four public restaurants for students to gain experience. Food served at the American Bounty Restaurant highlights Hudson Valley produce and is prepared in the style of cuisines of the Americas. The Bocuse Restaurant serves traditional French food using modern techniques. It was the first of the school's restaurants, and opened as the Epicurean Room and Rabalais Grill in 1973, before being renamed the Escoffier Restaurant (after Auguste Escoffier) in 1974. In 2012 it was again renamed to honor Paul Bocuse, and given a $3 million renovation by Adam Tihany. The Ristorante Caterina de' Medici is a restaurant with a focus on Italian food. The Apple Pie Bakery Café has a casual atmosphere.

The school also frequently creates on-campus pop-up restaurants, including Post Road Brew House. The second of the campus' pop-ups, the gastropub opened in February 2016 in the General Foods Nutrition Center.

Students participate in intercollegiate, intramural, and club athletics. Its intercollegiate program began in 2004, and is affiliated with the Hudson Valley Intercollegiate Athletic Conference.

=== Jacksonville, Florida ===
Rendering of future Jacksonville campus location

The Culinary Institute of America, with the support of the City of Jacksonville, announced the selected site for its future Southeast hub. The campus is expected to be part of a $160.5 million hotel and convention center development at 330 E. Bay St. on Jacksonville’s riverfront, assuming the deal is seen to fruition.

=== Napa County, California ===
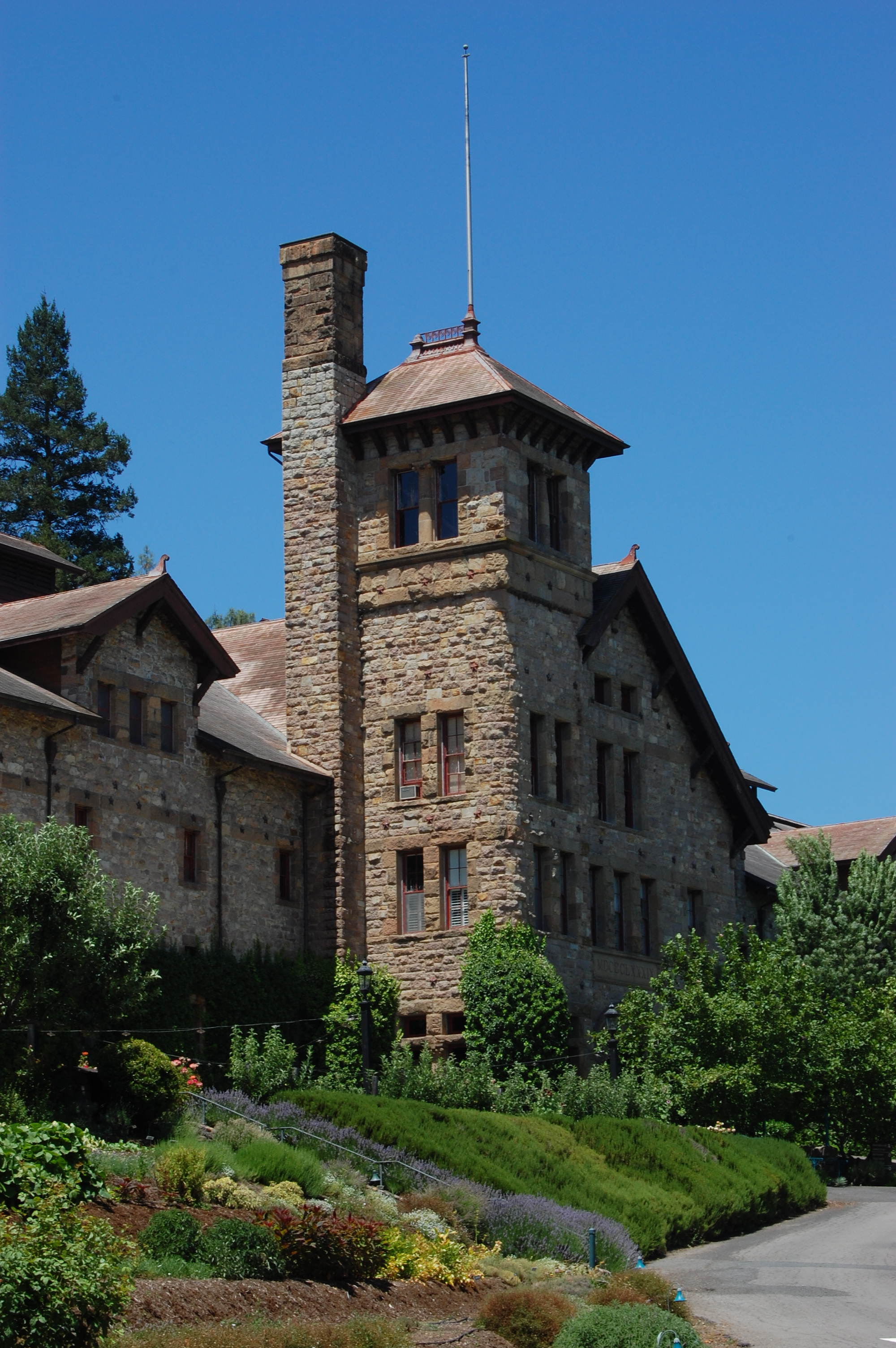
Main facility in St. Helena, California

The CIA has two campuses in Napa County, California. The campus in St. Helena is known as the Culinary Institute of America at Greystone; the other campus, in the city of Napa, is known as the Culinary Institute of America at Copia. The Greystone campus runs associate degree programs, certificate programs, continuing education courses, and custom classes.

The campus also operates two restaurants. The Gatehouse Restaurant offers contemporary dishes using regional ingredients, and the Bakery Café by illy serves food prepared by students in the college's baking and pastry arts degree program.

The Copia campus was purchased in 2015. The building and grounds were formerly Copia, a museum in downtown Napa that operated from 2001 to 2008. The campus opened in 2016 as the Culinary Institute of America at Copia, to house the CIA's new Food Business School and includes a restaurant, the Restaurant at CIA Copia.

=== San Antonio, Texas ===
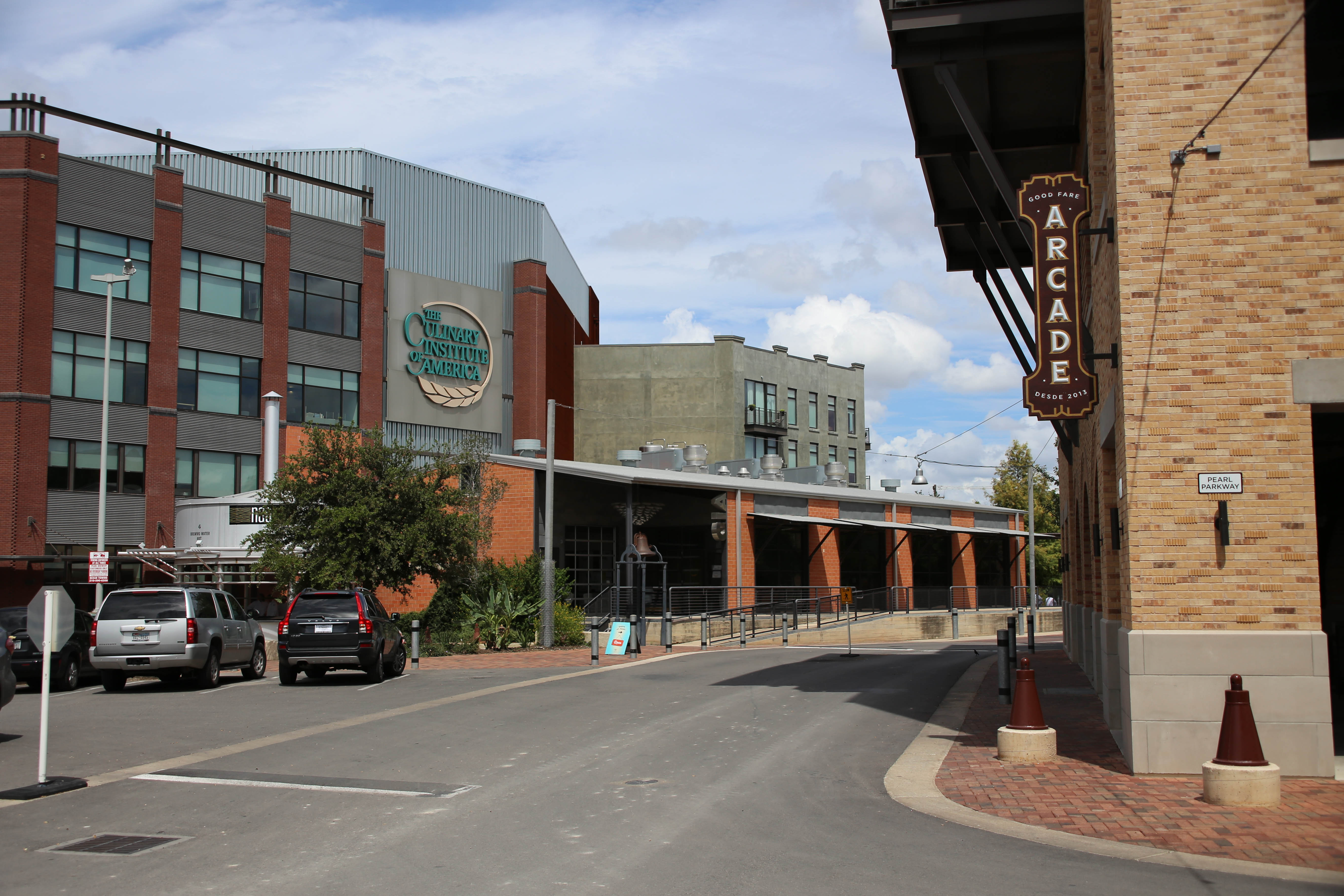
The CIA San Antonio

The San Antonio campus is located in Downtown San Antonio's Pearl Brewery, and runs associate degree programs in culinary arts and baking and pastry arts, as well as programs for professionals and food enthusiasts. The campus' restaurant, Savor, serves dishes inspired by ingredients and techniques from around the world. The campus also hosts seminars and conferences for foodservice professionals.

=== Singapore ===
The Culinary Institute of America, with the Singapore Institute of Technology and Temasek Polytechnic, runs its bachelor's degree program in Culinary Arts Management in Singapore to graduates of Polytechnic institutions who have earned diplomas in hospitality, tourism, or culinary arts. Temasek Polytechnic and the CIA constructed a 30,000-square-foot (2,800 m^{2}) educational facility with three teaching kitchens to house the programs.

== Organization and administration ==
The Culinary Institute of America is a nonprofit organization governed by a 24-member board of trustees. These trustees are elected to three-year terms by the Members of the Corporation, the stakeholders of the CIA. Each trustee can serve a maximum of four terms. The board appoints the president and votes on major initiatives for operation of the college, including tuition and fees, nomination of new trustees, operating and capital budgets, planning, major construction projects, and bylaw changes and amendments. The school's board of trustees has 24 members, including Ralph Brennan, Thomas Keller, Michael Mina, Robert A. Muh, Charlie Palmer, Roy Yamaguchi, and chairman Jon L. Luther.

The president of the school is Michiel Bakker. The president's cabinet consists of seven vice presidents, the campus's provost, and its chief of staff. There is proportionately a large number of departments, for operating various functions related to foodservice classes and restaurants.

On September 27, 2015, the Culinary Craft Association (CCA), a union at the school, protested the CIA's outsourcing of jobs. The school had allegedly demanded that union workers cut ties to other unions in order to keep their jobs.

The official school colors are green and gold, allegedly chosen because they are common food colors. The college logo includes a stalk of wheat.

=== Faculty ===
As of Fall 2022, the school had 130 full-time and 67 part-time faculty members.

== Academics ==
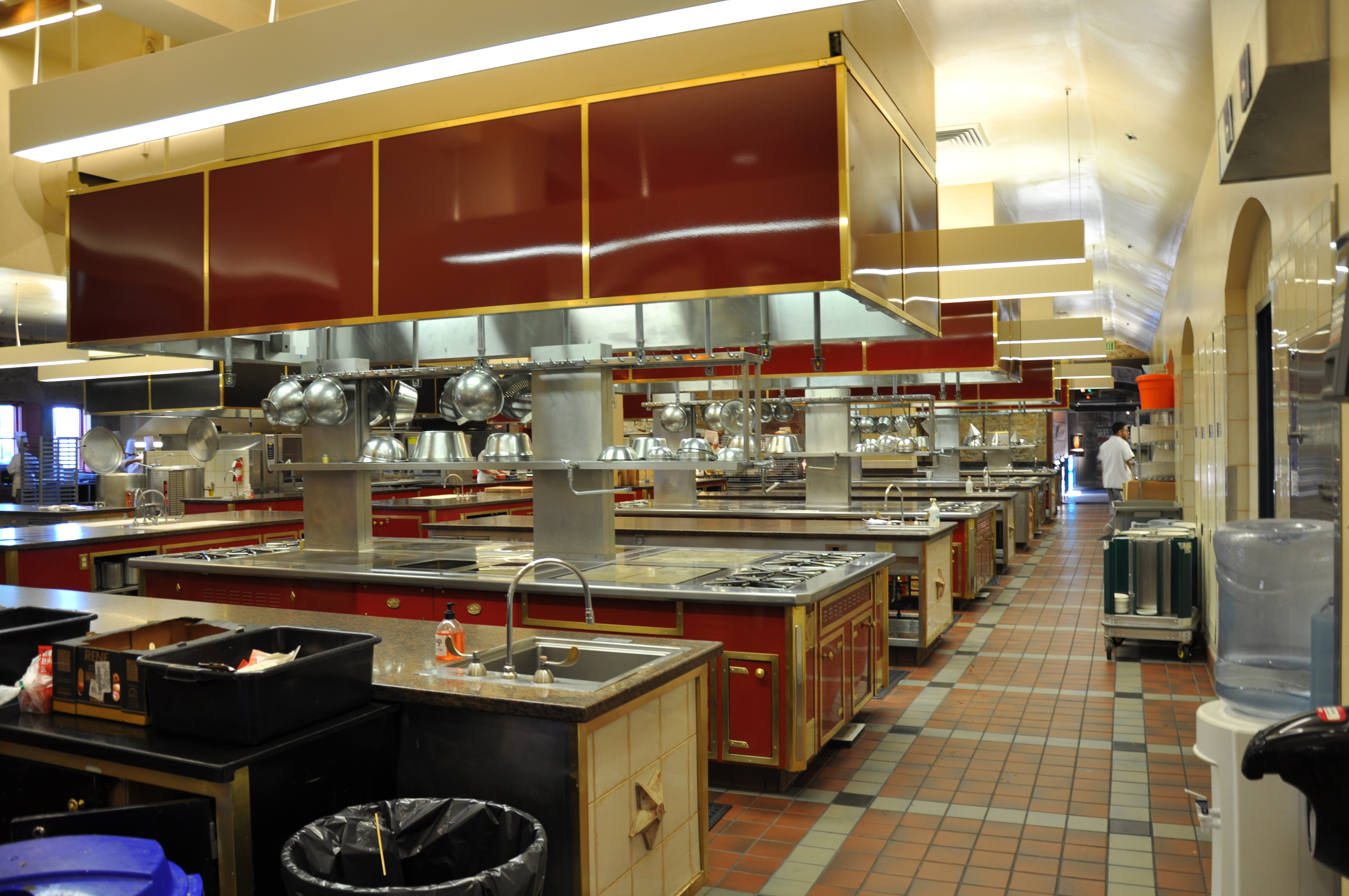
Teaching kitchens at the Greystone campus

The Gatehouse Restaurant, Greystone's student-run restaurant

On April 23, 2013, about 90 students held a walkout to protest declining educational standards.

=== Degree programs ===
The college offers multiple associate and bachelor's degrees programs, as well as master's degree programs. Each associate and bachelor's program requires a 15-week externship at a CIA-approved foodservice operation. The school's degree programs are accredited by the Middle States Commission on Higher Education.

=== The Food Business School ===
In spring 2015, the institute opened the Food Business School for executive and graduate education in business. The school's faculty are instructors at UC Berkeley, Stanford University, and UC Davis; some were chefs, restaurant consultants and other food industry employees. The school involves three separate programs: online classes, 3- or 4-day sessions at the Greystone campus or other areas in the San Francisco Bay Area, and multiple-month-long programs. Tuition varies from $400 for a single course to $4,000 for an "intensive retreat". The program only offers certificates, but not graduate degrees.

=== Other programs and courses ===
The college's New York campus also offers continuing education courses and certificate programs. The California and Texas campuses run several continuing education classes, and the California campus also has programs for wine professionals. A variety of programs for food enthusiasts are run as well at all the U.S. campuses. The college partnered with Epicurious in running an online cooking school featuring a variety of culinary classes. The CIA also runs a certification program called ProChef, a program to recognize culinary and academic skills, as well as familiarity with business practices.

The CIA's California campus runs an accelerated culinary program for students with previous bachelor's degrees in the hospitality field. Several classes are run with an intensified curriculum.

=== Libraries and museums ===
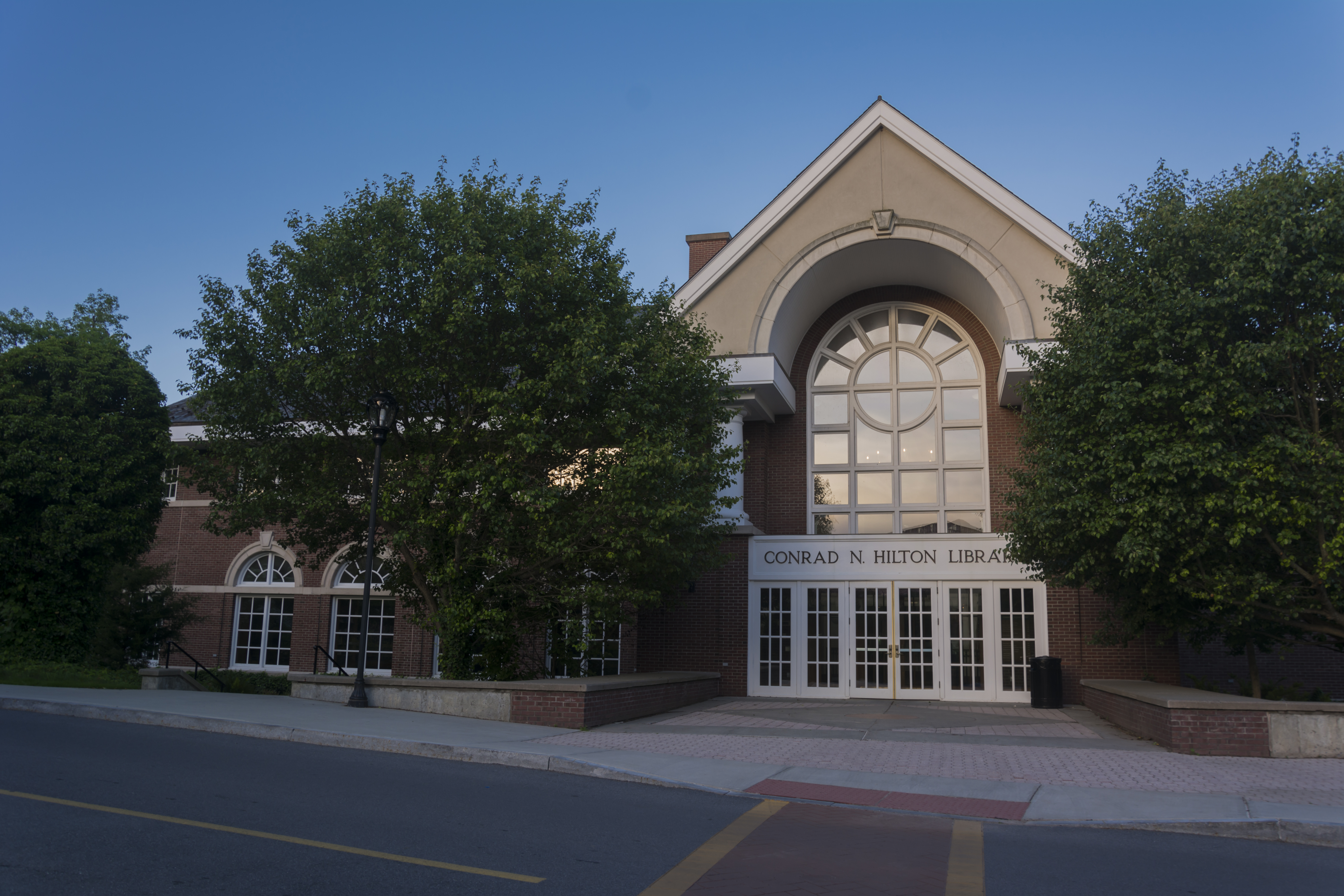
The Conrad N. Hilton Library

The school's Archives and Special Collections department is located in the Hyde Park campus' Conrad N. Hilton Library. Highlights of the collection includes a Roman amphora displayed in the Archives Reading Room, menu covers for New York City's Chanterelle Restaurant which were designed by notable artists, and a 1556 Latin edition of Athenaeus' Deipnosophistae, volume 15.

The Greystone campus maintains the Margie Schubert Library, located adjacent to the school's teaching kitchens.

The CIA also operates a college museum, the Chuck Williams Culinary Arts Museum, at its Copia campus in Napa.

== Student body ==
=== Admissions ===
Undergraduate admission to the Culinary Institute of America is characterized by College Board as "not selective". As of April 2024, The Princeton Review gave the university an admissions selectivity rating of 75 out of 99. In fall 2022, the school received 1,887 applications, of which 95 percent were accepted. The Culinary Institute of America admits all students on a need-blind basis.

=== Enrollment ===
In Fall of 2022, the university had an enrollment of 3,005 undergraduate students, of which 415 were transfer students, and 119 graduate students; 95 percent of students were enrolled full-time. Of all the students, 18 percent were from New York and 12 percent were international students. Approximately 82 percent of the student body was 24 years of age or younger. The average high school grade point average was 3.0, and 68 percent of undergraduate students lived on campus.

In 2014, undergraduates were enrolled in five schools: the School of Culinary Arts, the School of Baking and Pastry Arts, the School of Business and Management, the School of Liberal Arts and Food Studies, and the School of Culinary Science and Nutrition. Within the bachelor programs, 83% of student majors are in business management, 10% in culinary science, and 6% are interdisciplinary.

As of July 2016, associate and bachelor's degree tuitions are $14,315 per semester ($28,630 per year). Other charges vary per campus. With board, supplies, and fees, the first semester is typically about $17,200, with later semesters around $16,500. Room fees vary, with New York per-semester rates from $3,210 for a double-occupancy room to $4,085 for a single. In California, on-campus quads or triples are $3,200, doubles are $3,800, and singles are $4,700. Tuition and residence hall rates are set to increase in July 2017. In 2017, the Princeton Review estimated the average annual total for a student before aid was $46,846, and cost per credit hour before aid was $955. The average need-based financial aid was $13,950, and 100% of students judged to have financial need received aid; that was 64% of the student body. The average need-based loan was $3,825, and the average loan debt per graduate was $51,200. 88% of graduates were offered full-time employment within six months, with an average starting salary of $33,754 per year. Average earnings from on-campus employment were $2,355; the school offers federal and other work study accommodations.

== Publications ==
The college's newsletter for alumni, mise en place, aims to improve the relationship between the school and its alumni by providing information of interest about the college, its alumni, and students; covering of major issues and events concerning the college; and featuring the leadership and contributions of the school's alumni.

La Papillote, the school's student newspaper, was established in 1979. The paper uses submissions from students, chefs, and outside professionals.

== Branding ==
The CIA has a brand licensing program that sells branded products for foodservice operations and households, and it also publishes cookbooks for professional and home use. The school's general cookbook, The Professional Chef also has an interactive iPad edition that PC Magazine called "a new frontier for books." During the late 1990s, the CIA produced the PBS television show Cooking Secrets of the CIA.

== Events ==
Beginning in April 2007, the school hosts the CIA Leadership Awards event annually to honor people for success and achievements in the foodservice industry. The events are organized as fundraising dinners, with CEOs and other prominent members of the industry attending, sponsoring student scholarships. At the Leadership Awards event, the school issues the Augie Award, named for Auguste Escoffier, the French chef and restaurateur who popularized and modernized French cuisine. In 2017, Shep Gordon, Jacques Pépin, and Martha Stewart were each recipients of the award.

In 2017, the CIA began hosting its Thomas Keller Golf Classic, a golf outing and fundraiser for student scholarships. The school hosted the inaugural event on June 17 at Silverado Resort and the school's Copia campus in Napa County, near Keller's restaurant the French Laundry.

== Notable alumni ==
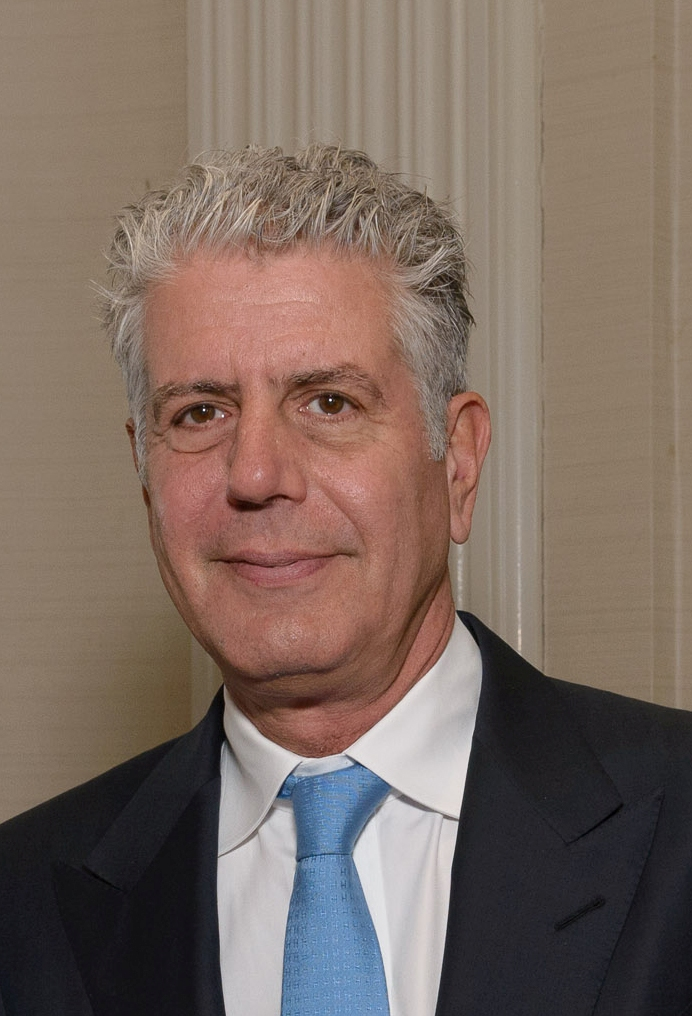
Anthony Bourdain, chef, author, television host

The CIA has more than 55,000 graduates in the culinary industry. Some of the college's notable alumni include:

- Grant Achatz
- John Besh
- Richard Blais
- Jérôme Bocuse
- Anthony Bourdain
- David Burke
- Anne Burrell
- Maneet Chauhan
- Kelsey Barnard Clark
- Michael Chiarello
- Roy Choi
- Mike Colameco
- Scott Conant
- Cat Cora
- Dan Coudreaut
- Rocco DiSpirito
- John Doherty
- Steve Ells
- Todd English
- Dean Fearing
- Susan Feniger
- Larry Forgione
- Amanda Freitag
- Duff Goldman
- Johnny Iuzzini
- Vikas Khanna
- Spike Mendelsohn
- Michael Mina
- Rick Moonen
- Sara Moulton
- Rajat Parr
- Charlie Palmer
- L. Timothy Ryan
- Walter Scheib
- Barton Seaver
- Michael Smith
- Pichaya Soontornyanakij
- Kerry Simon
- Michael Symon
- Roy Yamaguchi
- Geoffrey Zakarian

== Notable faculty ==
In 2020, CIA graduate Roshara Sanders became the first Black woman to teach in the culinary department.

== In popular culture ==
Several books have been written about the school. Journalist Michael Ruhlman, in his first book about the CIA, The Making of a Chef, documents his experiences as he passes through the classes at an accelerated rate. In another book, The Soul of a Chef, he documents seven chefs taking the ACF Master Chef test held there semi-annually. Kitchen Confidential by Anthony Bourdain also features an in-depth discussion of the author's education at the CIA. The book Beaten, Seared, and Sauced: On Becoming a Chef at The Culinary Institute of America by Jonathan Dixon, describes from first-hand the experience of a student at the CIA. In 2015, the SyFy show Ghost Hunters filmed an episode about the school's Hyde Park campus. Chef Sydney Adamu (Ayo Edebiri) of The Bear put herself through CIA by working as a driver for United Parcel Service (UPS); she quipped in the season one finale that she was educated at the culinary school, not the Central Intelligence Agency, but she "could do a regime change if [she] wanted to."
