= Katharine Cramer Angell =

Co-founder of the Culinary Institute of America

- Born: Katharine Cramer; July 23, 1890; Charlotte, North Carolina
- Died: July 22, 1983 (aged 92); Ellsworth, Maine
- Known for: Co-founding the Culinary Institute of America
- Spouses: Paul Woodman (died 1930); James Rowland Angell (m. 1932; died 1949)

Katharine Cramer Angell (July 23, 1890 – July 22, 1983) was one of two named founders of the Culinary Institute of America.

== Early and personal life ==
Born in Charlotte, North Carolina in 1890 to Bertha Hobart Cramer and Stuart Warren Cramer, an engineer and owner of mills, Katharine Cramer attended Queens College and Finch School.

She married merchant Paul Woodman in 1915, and had six children with him; he died in 1930. A wealthy widow, she married James Rowland Angell, President of Yale University, two years later. James died in 1949, 17 years after their marriage.

She chaired the Consumer Division of the State Defense Committee in World War II, and her eldest son, Edward, died near the end of the war. Angell channeled her grief into helping returning war veterans with employment skills.

== Career ==
In 1946, Angell and Frances Roth, along with the New Haven Restaurant Association, helped found the New Haven Restaurant Institute. The school was later renamed the Culinary Institute of America. Angell regarded the school as a memorial to her dead son. Since the institute was accredited, students qualified for G.I. Bill payments, and Angell created a loan fund for students whose payments were late. She used her own money to help the institute and raised money for it. When the institute purchased a mansion in September 1947 for $75,000 to allow expansion of the school, she guaranteed the loan. She convinced the union of dining hall workers at Yale to allow the school to make meals for Yale athletes. From 1948 until her retirement in 1966, she chaired the board of the institute.

In 1972 she was honoured with the Yale Medal. Until her death she remained working with the Culinary Institute.

== Death ==
Angell died on July 22, 1983, at the age of 92 in Ellsworth, Maine at the Maine Coast Memorial Hospital, due to a pulmonary embolism.
