= List of Culinary Institute of America alumni =

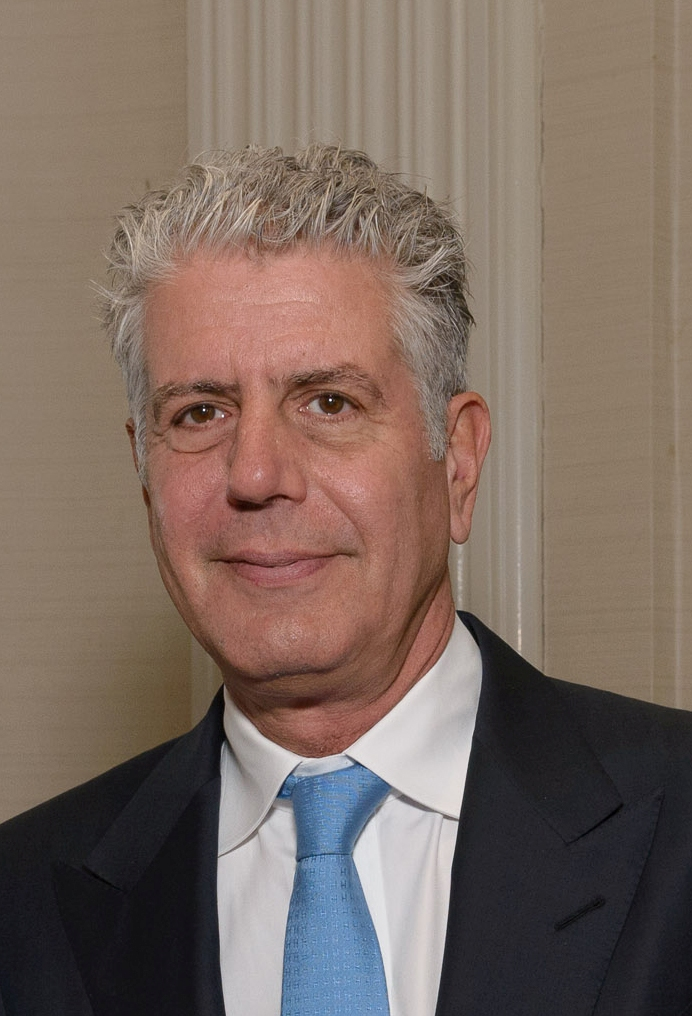
Anthony Bourdain, chef, author, television host

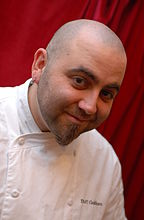
Duff Goldman

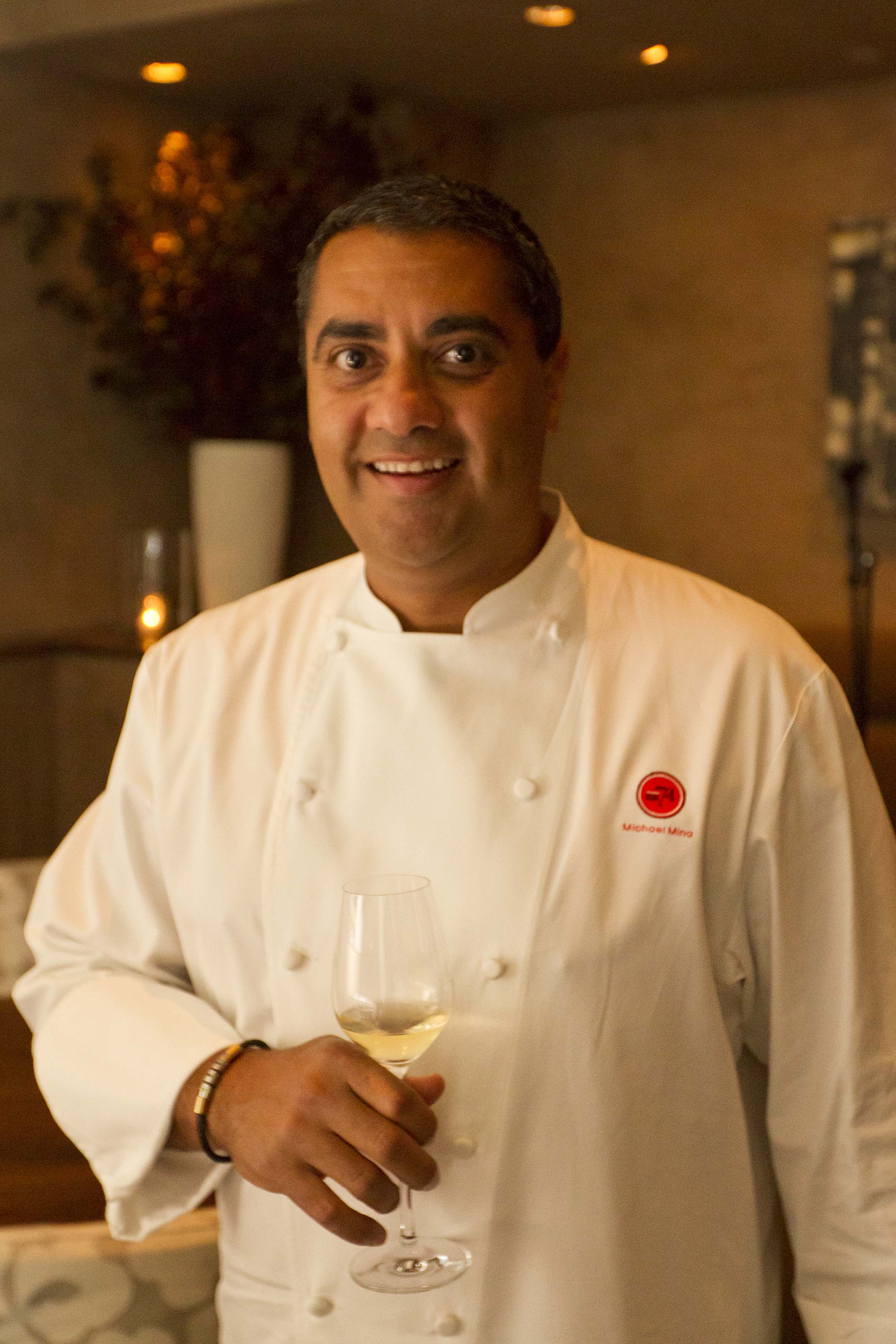
Michael Mina

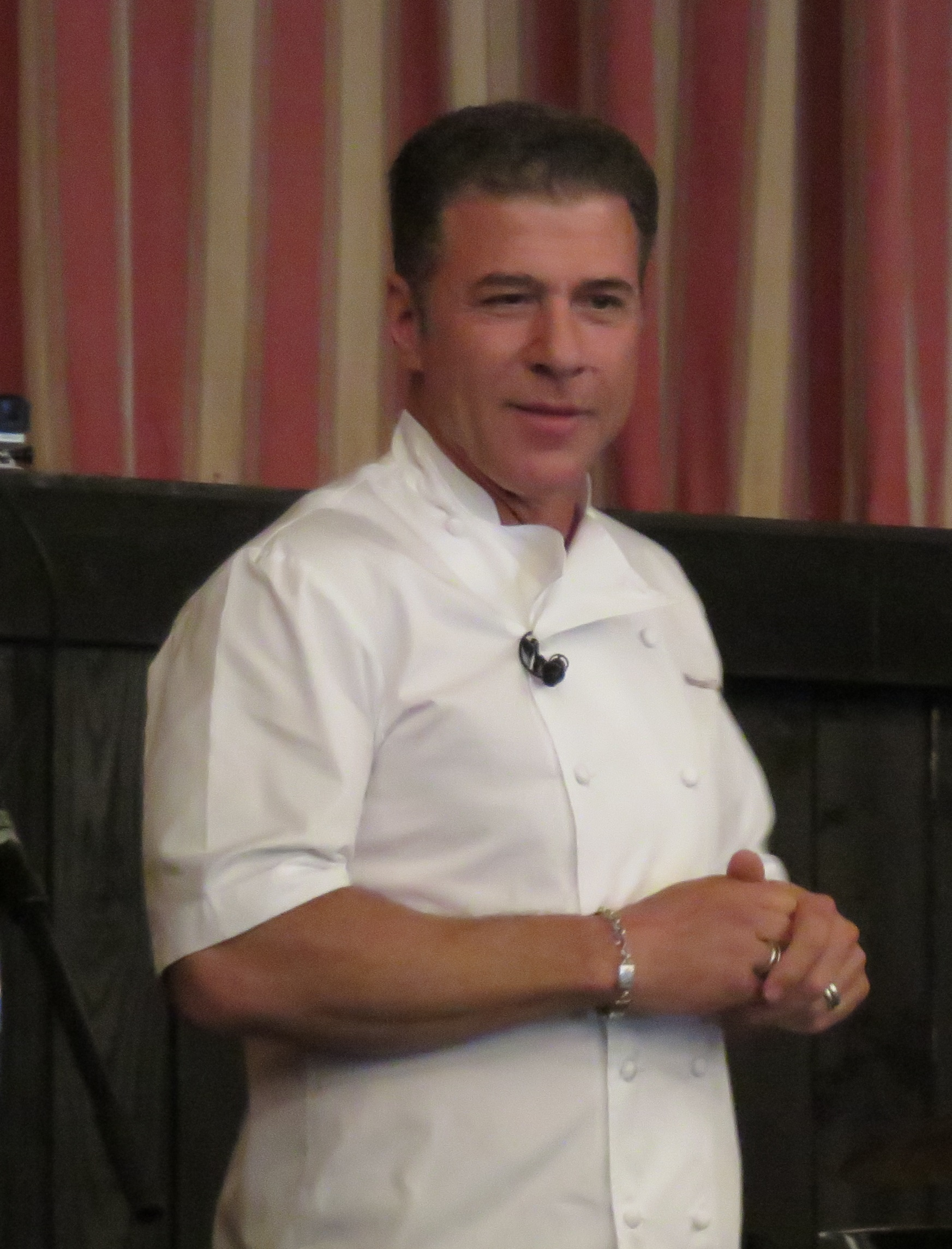
Michael Chiarello

The Culinary Institute of America has more than 55,000 graduates in the culinary industry. Notable alumni include:

- Grant Achatz
- David Adjey
- Stephen Asprinio
- Emel Başdoğan
- John Besh
- Richard Blais
- Marcy Blum
- Jérôme Bocuse
- Anthony Bourdain
- David Burke
- Anne Burrell
- Andrew Carmellini
- David Carmichael
- Josef Centeno
- Maneet Chauhan
- Richard Chen
- Michael Chiarello
- Roy Choi
- Mike Colameco
- Scott Conant
- Cat Cora
- Dan Coudreaut
- Robert Danhi
- Gary Danko
- Jill Davie
- Marcel Desaulniers
- Harold Dieterle
- Rocco DiSpirito
- John Doherty
- Sohla El-Waylly
- Steve Ells
- Todd English
- Dean Fearing
- Susan Feniger
- Larry Forgione
- Amanda Freitag
- Alex García
- Geoffrey Gatza
- Duff Goldman
- Todd Gray
- Ilan Hall
- Johnny Hernandez
- Rochelle Huppin
- Hung Huynh
- Johnny Iuzzini
- Joseph Johnson
- Melissa Kelly
- Vikas Khanna
- Eli Kulp
- Maciej Kuroń
- Sara La Fountain
- Francis Lam
- Stephen Langlois
- Andrew Le
- Bruce Lefebvre
- Matthew Levin
- Kelly Liken
- Shane Lyons
- Christina Machamer
- Tracy Malechek-Ezekiel
- Erin Jeanne McDowell
- Thomas McNaughton
- Jehangir Mehta
- Spike Mendelsohn
- George Mendes
- Michael Mina
- Rick Moonen
- Daniela Moreira
- Sara Moulton
- Bradley Ogden
- Ken Oringer
- Ralph Pagano
- Charlie Palmer
- Stella Parks
- Rajat Parr
- Melissa Perello
- Tina Pickett
- Ben Pollinger
- Alfred Portale
- Ana Liz Pulido
- Dora Ramírez
- Britt Rescigno
- L. Timothy Ryan
- Jeffrey Saad
- Roshara Sanders
- Walter Scheib
- Pedro Miguel Schiaffano
- Chris Schlesinger
- Barton Seaver
- Kerry Simon
- Michael Smith
- Greggy Soriano
- Lon Symensma
- Michael Symon
- Dale Talde
- Sue Torres
- Marcel Vigneron
- Jason Vincent
- Paul Virant
- Bryan Voltaggio
- Brendan Walsh
- Chris Waters
- Jasper White
- Laurie Wolf
- Roy Yamaguchi
- Sherry Yard
- Geoffrey Zakarian
- Eric Ziebold
