= Pollinger =

Pollinger is a surname. Notable people with the surname include:

- Ben Pollinger (born ?), U.S. chef
- Franz Ignaz Pollinger (c. mid-19th century), Austrian painter
- Laurence Pollinger (fl. 1935–1956), English literary agent (see Pearn, Pollinger & Higham)
- Samuel Pollinger (1868–1943), Canadian Anglican bishop
