= Top Chef: D.C. =

Season 7 of American television series

- Season 7
- Hosted by: Padma Lakshmi
- Judges: Tom Colicchio; Gail Simmons; Eric Ripert
- No. of contestants: 17
- Winner: Kevin Sbraga
- Runners-up: Angelo Sosa; Ed Cotton
- Location: Washington, D.C.
- Finals venue: Singapore
- Fan Favorite: Tiffany Derry
- No. of episodes: 15

Release
- Original network: Bravo
- Original release: June 16 – September 22, 2010

Season chronology
- ← Previous; Las Vegas Next → All-Stars

Top Chef: D.C. is the seventh season of the American reality television series Top Chef. The season was initially filmed in Washington, D.C. before concluding in Singapore, the series' first international venue. It premiered on June 16, 2010, and concluded on September 22, 2010. In the season finale, Kevin Sbraga was declared the winner over runners-up Angelo Sosa and Ed Cotton. Tiffany Derry was voted Fan Favorite.

== Contestants ==
Seventeen chefs competed in Top Chef: D.C.

Name	Hometown	Current Residence (Note: The contestants' city and state of residence during time of filming.)	Age
Amanda Baumgarten	Los Angeles, California		27
Tracey Bloom	Rochester, New York	Atlanta, Georgia	33
Ed Cotton	Boston, Massachusetts	Queens, New York	32
Andrea Curto-Randazzo	Vero Beach, Florida	Miami Beach, Florida	39
Tim Dean	Washington, D.C.	Baltimore, Maryland	39
Tiffany Derry	Beaumont, Texas	Dallas, Texas	26
Lynne Gigliotti	Philadelphia, Pennsylvania	Hyde Park, New York	51
Kenny Gilbert	Euclid, Ohio	Telluride, Colorado	36
Stephen Hopcraft	Cleveland, Ohio	Las Vegas, Nevada	40
Kelly Liken	Pittsburgh, Pennsylvania	Vail, Colorado	33
Jacqueline Lombard	Boston, Massachusetts	Brooklyn, New York	33
Arnold Myint	Nashville, Tennessee		32
Alex Reznik	Brooklyn, New York	Hollywood, California	33
Kevin Sbraga	Willingboro, New Jersey		30
John Somerville	Detroit, Michigan	West Bloomfield, Michigan	42
Angelo Sosa	Durham, Connecticut	New York, New York	34
Tamesha Warren	Barbados	Washington, D.C.	24

Angelo Sosa and Tiffany Derry returned to compete in Top Chef: All-Stars. Amanda Baumgarten returned for Top Chef: Charleston. Sosa returned again for Top Chef: All-Stars L.A.

== Contestant progress ==
Episode #		1	2	3	4	5	6	7	8	9	10	11	12	13	14
Quickfire Challenge Winner(s)		Angelo^{1}	Angelo; Tracey	Kenny	Kenny^{1} Tamesha^{1}	Ed	Kelly^{2}	Angelo	Tiffany	Amanda^{1} Kelly^{1} Kenny^{1} Kevin^{1}	Tiffany^{1}	Ed^{1}	Angelo^{1}	Ed	N/A
Contestant		Elimination Challenge Results													
1	Kevin	HIGH	IN	LOW	LOW	HIGH	WIN	LOW	HIGH	LOW	IN	LOW	IN	LOW	WINNER
2	Ed	IN	LOW	HIGH	IN	IN	IN	HIGH	LOW	WIN	HIGH	WIN	IN	WIN	RUNNER-UP
2	Angelo	WIN	LOW	HIGH	IN	IN	IN	IN	IN	HIGH	LOW	LOW	WIN	LOW	RUNNER-UP
4	Kelly	IN	WIN	IN	WIN	HIGH	IN^{2}	LOW	HIGH	LOW	HIGH	LOW	IN	OUT	
5	Tiffany	IN	HIGH	IN	IN	IN	HIGH	HIGH	WIN	HIGH	WIN	HIGH	OUT		
6	Amanda	IN	LOW	HIGH	IN	LOW	IN	IN	IN	LOW	LOW	OUT			
7	Alex	HIGH	IN	IN	IN	IN	IN	WIN	LOW	HIGH	OUT				
8	Kenny	HIGH	LOW	IN	LOW	WIN	LOW	IN	IN	OUT					
9	Stephen	LOW	LOW	LOW	IN	LOW	IN	IN	OUT						
10	Andrea	IN	IN	IN	WIN	HIGH	IN	OUT							
11	Tamesha	IN	LOW	IN	IN	IN	OUT								
12	Tim	LOW	IN	LOW	IN	OUT									
13	Arnold	IN	HIGH	WIN	OUT										
13	Lynne	IN	HIGH	IN	OUT										
15	Tracey	IN	LOW	OUT											
16	Jacqueline	LOW	OUT												
17	John	OUT													

^Note 1: The chef(s) did not receive immunity for winning the Quickfire Challenge.
^Note 2: As a reward for winning the Quickfire Challenge, Kelly was allowed to sit out the Elimination Challenge.

(WINNER) The chef won the season and was crowned "Top Chef".
(RUNNER-UP) The chef was a runner-up for the season.
(WIN) The chef won the Elimination Challenge.
(HIGH) The chef was selected as one of the top entries in the Elimination Challenge, but did not win.
(IN) The chef was not selected as one of the top or bottom entries in the Elimination Challenge and was safe.
(LOW) The chef was selected as one of the bottom entries in the Elimination Challenge, but was not eliminated.
(OUT) The chef lost the Elimination Challenge.

== Episodes ==
No. overall	No. in season	Title	Original release date
90	1	"House of Chef-presentatives"	June 16, 2010
Quickfire Challenge: The 17 chefs competed in a three-round mise en place tournament; the tasks were: peel 10 potatoes, brunoise 10 cups of onions, and finally break down 4 chickens into 8 parts, eliminating multiple chefs at each leg. The final four chefs were given 30 minutes to make a dish with the ingredients from the first three rounds, plus items from the Top Chef pantry. Instead of immunity, the winner received $20,000.: Winner: Angelo (Roasted Wing & Thigh, Curried Onion Jam, Potato Noodles); Elimination Challenge: Each chef created a dish that represented where they were from for 300 guests at an event during the Cherry Blossom Festival. The chefs were divided into four groups; each chef competed head-to-head with the others in their group. The chef in each group with the best dish was eligible for the win, while the chef with the poorest dish in each group was subject to elimination. The four Quickfire finalists were allowed to choose the chefs whom they would compete against to form the four teams.: Team 1: Angelo, John, Kelly, Tiffany; Team 2: Ed, Kenny, Lynne, Stephen, Tracey; Team 3: Amanda, Arnold, Jacqueline, Kevin; Team 4: Alex, Andrea, Tamesha, Tim; Winner: Angelo (Arctic Char with Pickled Shallots, Tapioca & Smoked Bacon Froth); Eliminated: John (Maple Mousse Napoleon with Crisp Macadamia Nuts & Vanilla Sauce)
91	2	"Outside the Lunch Box"	June 23, 2010
Quickfire Challenge: Working in pairs, the chefs made a "bipartisan" sandwich while joined together with a "double-apron", allowing each chef the use of only one hand.: Winners: Angelo, Tracey (Flounder Marinated in Fish Sauce, Spicy Sriracha Mayo, Pickled Red Onions); Elimination Challenge: Inspired by Michelle Obama's Let's Move! campaign, the chefs, working in teams of four, had to create a healthy four-course school lunch for kids at Alice Deal Middle School, consisting of an entrée, two side dishes, and a dessert. Each chef was responsible for one item on the menu. Sam Kass guest judges.: Team 1: Angelo, Ed, Kenny, Tracey; Team 2: Amanda, Jacqueline, Stephen, Tamesha; Team 3: Alex, Andrea, Kevin, Tim; Team 4: Arnold, Kelly, Lynne, Tiffany; Winner: Kelly (Braised Pork Carnitas Tacos with Pickled Onions and Cilantro on Oat Tortillas); Eliminated: Jacqueline (Banana Pudding with Skim Milk & Strawberries)
92	3	"Capitol Grill"	June 30, 2010
Quickfire Challenge: The chefs were tasked with making a pie without a recipe. James Beard Award-winning pastry chef and cookbook author Johnny Iuzzini appears as guest judge.: Winner: Kenny (Bananas Foster Pie with Currants & Chinese Five-Spice); Elimination Challenge: The chefs catered an American picnic at Mount Vernon for Capitol Hill interns that included one main dish and two side dishes. Chef Jonathan Waxman guest judges.: Winner: Arnold (Sesame Lamb Meatball with Tabouli Salad & Gazpacho); Eliminated: Tracey (Italian Sausage Slider, Tomato, Cucumber & Red Onion Salad)
93	4	"Room Service"	July 7, 2010
Quickfire Challenge: The chefs prepared an adult dish and a baby-friendly purée version. Instead of immunity, the winners received $10,000 each.: Winners: Kenny (Curried Chicken, Mango Salad, Confit of Butternut Squash & Maitake Mushrooms); Tamesha (Salmon with Vegetable Chowder & Lobster Stock, Thai Basil & Licorice Oil); Elimination Challenge: In a tournament-style elimination, the chefs worked in pairs to prepare breakfast, lunch, and dinner for people on-the-go, to be placed on the Hilton Hotel's menu. Seven pairs prepared breakfast, and Amanda, Stephen, Tiffany, & Timothy were declared safe. The remaining five pairs prepared lunch, and Alex, Ed, Angelo & Tamesha saved. The last three pairs prepared dinner, where the team with the poorest dish was eliminated. The team with the judges' favorite dish had it placed on the hotel's menu. The two chefs of the winning team were also awarded separate trips, blindly selected, to either Italy or Spain. Chef Nora Pouillon guest judges.: Winners: Andrea, Kelly (Braised Beef Short Rib, Polenta, Shiitake Mushrooms & Citrus Gremolata); Eliminated: Arnold, Lynne (Pineapple Red Curry Mussels with Squid Ink Pasta & Focaccia)
94	5	"Farm Policy"	July 14, 2010
Quickfire Challenge: The chefs created dishes featuring Maryland blue crab.: Winner: Ed (Jumbo Lump Crab with Thai Basil, Mango & Cucumber Salad); Elimination Challenge: The chefs worked as a team to create a family-style farm lunch. Chef Patrick O'Connell guest judges.: Winner: Kenny (Hot and Sour Curried Eggplant with Peppers & Carrot Tops); Eliminated: Tim (Roasted Turnips & Asparagus with Honey)
95	6	"Cold War"	July 21, 2010
Quickfire Challenge: The chefs attempted to create a dish using strange or exotic proteins, including yak, Cayman crocodile, ostrich, frog legs, emu egg, duck white kidneys (testicles), duck tongue, and foie gras. Partway through the challenge, host Lakshmi ordered the contestants to trade their proteins with a neighboring chef. The winning chef was exempt from the Elimination Challenge.: Winner: Kelly (Emu Egg Omelet with Goat Cheese & Harissa Vinaigrette); Elimination Challenge: The chefs were divided into two groups to prepare individual dishes best served cold. The opposing group of chefs joined the panel of judges and the Quickfire winner to examine their competitors' dishes. A top dish and a bottom dish were nominated from each team. The winner received a six-night trip to the Hilton Hawaiian Village. Chef Michelle Bernstein guest judges.: Group A: Alex, Ed, Amanda, Kenny, Kevin; Group B: Andrea, Angelo, Tamesha, Tiffany, Stephen; Winner: Kevin (Tuna & Veal with Romaine Leaves, Pine Nuts & Mediterranean Condiments); Eliminated: Tamesha (Scallops with Pickled Rhubarb, Cilantro, Basil & Long Pepper in Rhubarb Jus)
96	7	"Power Lunch"	July 28, 2010
Quickfire Challenge: The chefs were required to create a dish served on a toothpick, mirroring the "toothpick rule", which states that congressmen cannot accept meals from lobbyists not eaten with a toothpick. The winner received $20,000.: Winner: Angelo (Cucumber Cup with Spiced Shrimp & Cashew); Elimination Challenge: The chefs took over the kitchen at the Washington branch of The Palm steakhouse for a lunch service. Each chef was randomly assigned one of five classic proteins served at The Palm: salmon, porterhouse steak, swordfish, lamb chops, and lobster. The winner had their dish put on The Palm's menu and their portrait on the wall. Guests include Mika Brzezinski, Savannah Guthrie, Joe Scarborough, Aaron Schock, Mark Warner, John Podesta, Kelly O'Donnell, Luke Russert and chef Art Smith.: Winner: Alex (Applewood Smoked Salmon with Black Forbidden Rice & English Pea Purée); Eliminated: Andrea (Pan-Seared Swordfish with "Risotto-Style" Couscous, Asparagus & Beurre Blanc)
97	8	"Foreign Affairs"	August 4, 2010
Quickfire Challenge: The chefs were asked to create an Ethiopian-inspired dish.: Winner: Tiffany (Beef Goulash with Poached Egg, Currants, Peppers & Yogurt); Elimination Challenge: The chefs had to make a dish inspired by a foreign country they selected, to serve at the Meridian Center for thousands of diplomats. The winner received $10,000. Chefs Marcus Samuelsson and José Andrés guest judge.: Winner: Tiffany (Mexico: Chicken Tamales with Queso Fresco & Tomatillo Sauce); Eliminated: Stephen (Brazil: Flank Steak in Chimichurri Sauce with Black Peas & Rice)
98	9	"Restaurant Wars"	August 11, 2010
Quickfire Challenge: The contestants separated into two teams for the Quickfire Challenge. Each team created one dish and competed in a tag-team cook-off. Each chef from each team had 10 minutes to cook (40 minutes total), while the remaining chefs wore blindfolds and could not communicate with the cooking chef. The winning team split $10,000. From this point forward, the winners of the Quickfire no longer received immunity from elimination. Then-Speaker of the House Nancy Pelosi guest judges.: Blue Team: Kevin, Kenny, Kelly, Amanda; Red Team: Ed, Tiffany, Angelo, Alex; Winner: Blue Team (Sautéed Shrimp, Angel Hair Pasta, Mustard Sauce & Crispy Basil); Elimination Challenge: Following the Restaurant Wars tradition, the teams from the Quickfire Challenge each created a pop-up restaurant name, concept, and menu. The winner received a trip to Terlato Vineyards in Napa. Food critic Frank Bruni is guest judge, with Bill and John Terlato of Terlato Wines as special guests.: EVOO: Ed, Tiffany, Angelo (EC), Alex (FOH); First Course: Confit of Tomato Soup, Squash & Olive Crouton (Angelo); Crudo of Black Bass & Yellowtail Snapper with Meyer Lemon-Caper Relish (Tiffany); Second Course: Striped Bass, Stewed Spinach, Chorizo & Clams (Tiffany); Slow-Baked Turbot, Eggplant Caviar & Black Olive Jus (Ed); Third Course: Pan-Seared Lamb Chop, English Pea Pureé, Smoked Bacon & Parmesan Foam (Alex); Seared Rib Eye Steak, Crushed Walnut Potatoes & Balsamic Fig Reduction (Angelo & Ed); Twenty One 21: Kevin, Kenny (EC), Kelly (FOH), Amanda; First Course: Chilled Sweet Corn Soup with Maryland Blue Crab Salad (Kelly); Beet Salad with Warm Chorizo-Citrus Vinaigrette (Kenny); Second Course: Oakwood Grilled Strip Steak with Roasted Sunchoke & Maitake Mushrooms (Amanda); Pan-Roasted Halibut, Fennel Marmalade & Tomato-Fennel Emulsion (Kevin); Third Course: Crispy Aged Goat Cheese & Strawberry-Rhubarb Relish (Kenny); Dark Chocolate Ganache Tart and Blackberry-Chocolate Chunk Ice Cream (Kelly); Winner: Ed; Eliminated: Kenny
99	10	"Covert Cuisine"	August 18, 2010
Quickfire Challenge: The chefs created dishes using the contents of a "mystery box", with more and more boxes arriving throughout their designated cooking time. The winner, selected by this episode's guest judge chef Wylie Dufresne, received $10,000.: Winner: Tiffany (Fish Stew with Hominy, Fava Beans, Saffron & Black Garlic); Elimination Challenge: The chefs took a classic dish and created a "new identity" for it. Their dishes were served at CIA headquarters to an array of Agency officers and staff including then-director Leon Panetta. The winner received a trip to Paris, France.: Winner: Tiffany ("Gyro": Roasted Leg of Lamb with Smoky Eggplant, Tomatoes & Pickled Onions); Eliminated: Alex ("Veal Parmesan": Veal & Parmigiano Cheese Tortelloni with Tomato Sauce & Tempura Cheese)
100	11	"Making Concessions"	August 25, 2010
Quickfire Challenge: The chefs created dishes based on a common food-based idiom.: Winner: Ed ("Hot Potato": Herb & Roasted Garlic Gnocchi, Spring Vegetables & Mushroom Fricassee); Elimination Challenge: The chefs worked as a team to operate a concession stand, with a minimum of six dishes, for a baseball game at Nationals Park. The winner received a trip to Australia. Washington Nationals players Matt Capps, John Lannan, and Adam Dunn are in attendance and chef Rick Moonen guest judges.: Winner: Ed (Shrimp & Corn Risotto Fritters with Jalapeño Aioli); Eliminated: Amanda (Yellowfish Tuna Tartare with Fennel, Meyer Lemon & Fava Bean Purée)
101	12	"Gastro-nauts"	September 1, 2010
Quickfire Challenge: The chefs had to choose a wine and had 1 hour to create a dish to pair it with. The winner received a trip to London.: Winner: Angelo (Evolution White Wine: Sautéed Foie Gras with Black Salt & Fennel Salad); Elimination Challenge: At NASA, the chefs were asked to create a dish that could be served in zero gravity. The winner received a brand new Toyota Avalon. Astronauts Buzz Aldrin and Leland D. Melvin are in attendance. Chef Anthony Bourdain and Dana Cowin, Editor-in-Chief of Food & Wine, guest judge.: Winner: Angelo (Ginger-Lacquered Short Ribs & Horseradish Créme Fraîche); Eliminated: Tiffany (Pan-Seared Alaskan Halibut with Coconut Curry, Snow Pea Shoots & Jasmine Rice)
102	13	"Season Finale, Part I"	September 8, 2010
Quickfire Challenge: The chefs are in Singapore, where they visit a street market called a hawker centre with food critic and guest judge KF Seetoh and are challenged to create traditional Singaporean street food using a wok. For the first time in the history of Top Chef, the winner of the final Quickfire Challenge won a guaranteed spot in the finals.: Winner: Ed (Stir-Fry Noodles with Black Pepper Sauce, Lobster & Gai Lan); Elimination Challenge: Working as one team, all four chefs created a cohesive menu celebrating Singaporean cuisine for an event hosted by Food & Wine magazine at Singapore's Tanjong Beach Club.: Winner: Ed (Sweet & Sour Pork with Crispy Rice & Potato Cakes, Gai Lan; Banana Fritter with Red Chili Paste); Eliminated: Kelly (Chilled Cucumber-Yogurt Soup, Bitter Melon Salad; Seared Prawns, Spicy Red Coconut Curry, Crispy Prawn Heads)
103	14	"Season Finale, Part II"	September 15, 2010
Elimination Challenge: The final three chefs were told to cook the best four-course meal of their lives, incorporating a vegetable, red mullet (Rouget), duck, and dessert. The finalists were assisted by previous Top Chef winners, chosen via knife pull. Ed drew Ilan Hall, Angelo drew Hung Huynh, and Kevin drew Michael Voltaggio.: Angelo: First Course: Pickled Royale Mushrooms, Char Siu Bao Pork Belly & Watermelon Tea; Second Course: Sautéed Rouget & Poached Cuttlefish with Asian Style Bouillabaisse; Third Course: Sautéed Duck Breast & Foie Gras with Marshmallow & Tart Cherry Shooter; Fourth Course: "Thai Jewel": Coconut-Vanilla Cream & Crushed Ice with Exotic Fruits; Ed: First Course: Chilled Summer Corn Velouté with Fried Black Cockles; Second Course: Stuffed Rouget, Glazed Slipper Lobster & Cuttlefish with Zucchini Pesto; Third Course: Duck Two Ways: Roasted Breast & Braised Stuffed Neck with Baby Spinach; Fourth Course: Sticky Toffee Date Pudding with Fleur de Sel Crème Chantilly; Kevin: First Course: Eggplant, Zucchini & Pepper Terrine, Tomatoes, Jalapeños & Black Garlic Purée; Second Course: Rouget, Cuttlefish "Noodles", Pork Belly, Cockles, Slipper Lobster & Cigala; Third Course: Roasted Duck Breast with Duck Dumpling, Caramelized Bok Choy & Coriander Sauce; Fourth Course: Frozen "Singapore Sling" with Tropical Fruits and coconut Panna Cotta; Winner: Kevin; Runners-up: Angelo, Ed
104	15	"Reunion"	September 22, 2010
