= 4th Engineer Battalion (United States) =

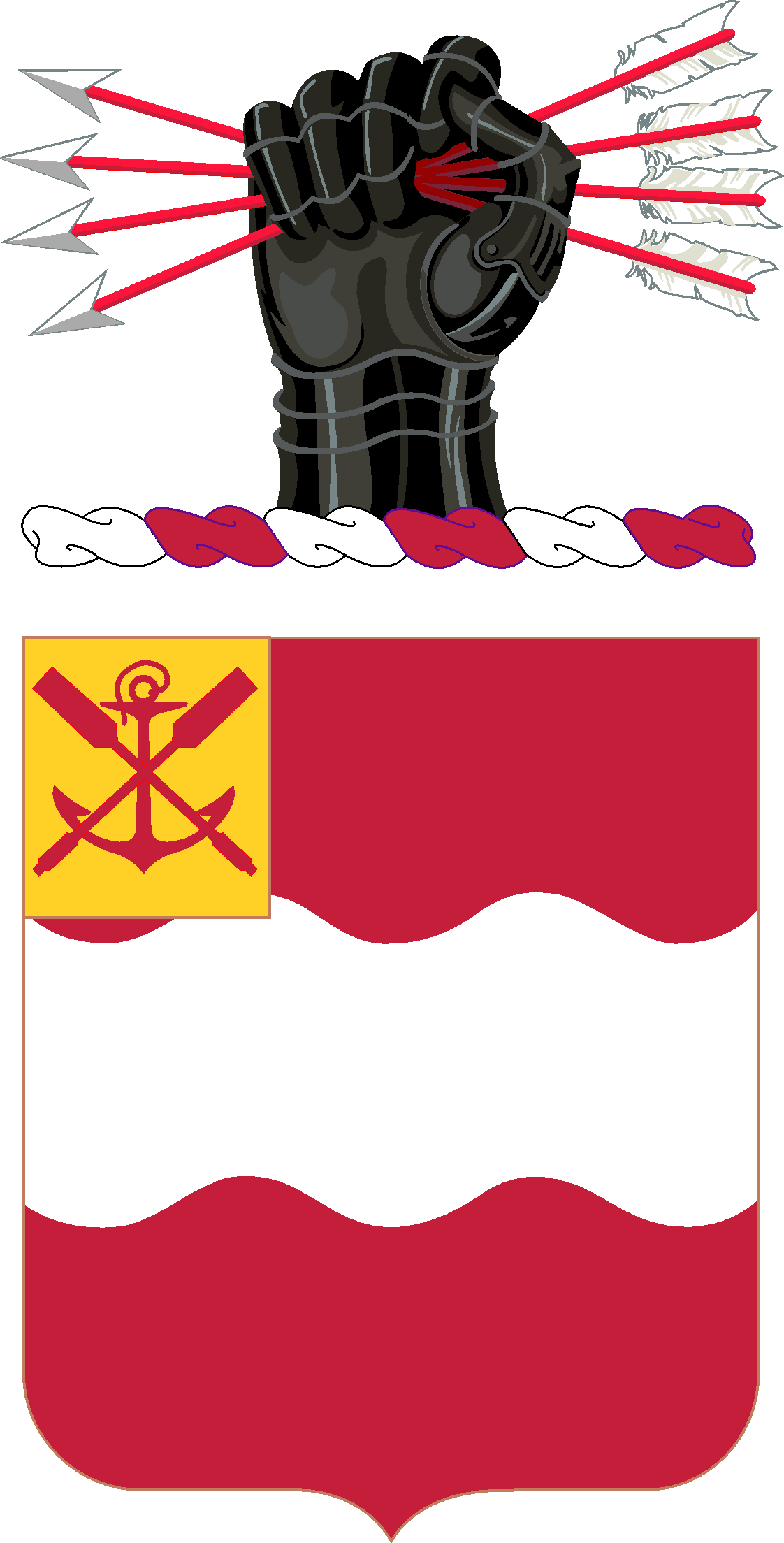
- Coat of Arms
- Active: 31 December 1861 – 21 September 1921; 24 July 1922 – 19 February 1946; 6 July 1948 – 15 December 2004; 18 October 2006 – present
- Country: United States
- Branch: U.S. Army Corps of Engineers
- Role: Combat engineering
- Battalion Headquarters: Fort Carson, Colorado, U.S.
- Nickname: Vanguard of the 4th Division
- Mottos: Volens Et Potens (Willing and Able)
- Engineer Corps Colors: Scarlett and White
- Engagements: World War I World War II; Vietnam War; War on terror
- Decorations: Presidential Unit Citation (Army); Meritorious Unit Commendation (Army); Belgian Fourragère 1940; Republic of Vietnam Cross of Gallantry with Palm; Republic of Vietnam Civil Action Honor Medal; Valorous Unit Award

Insignia
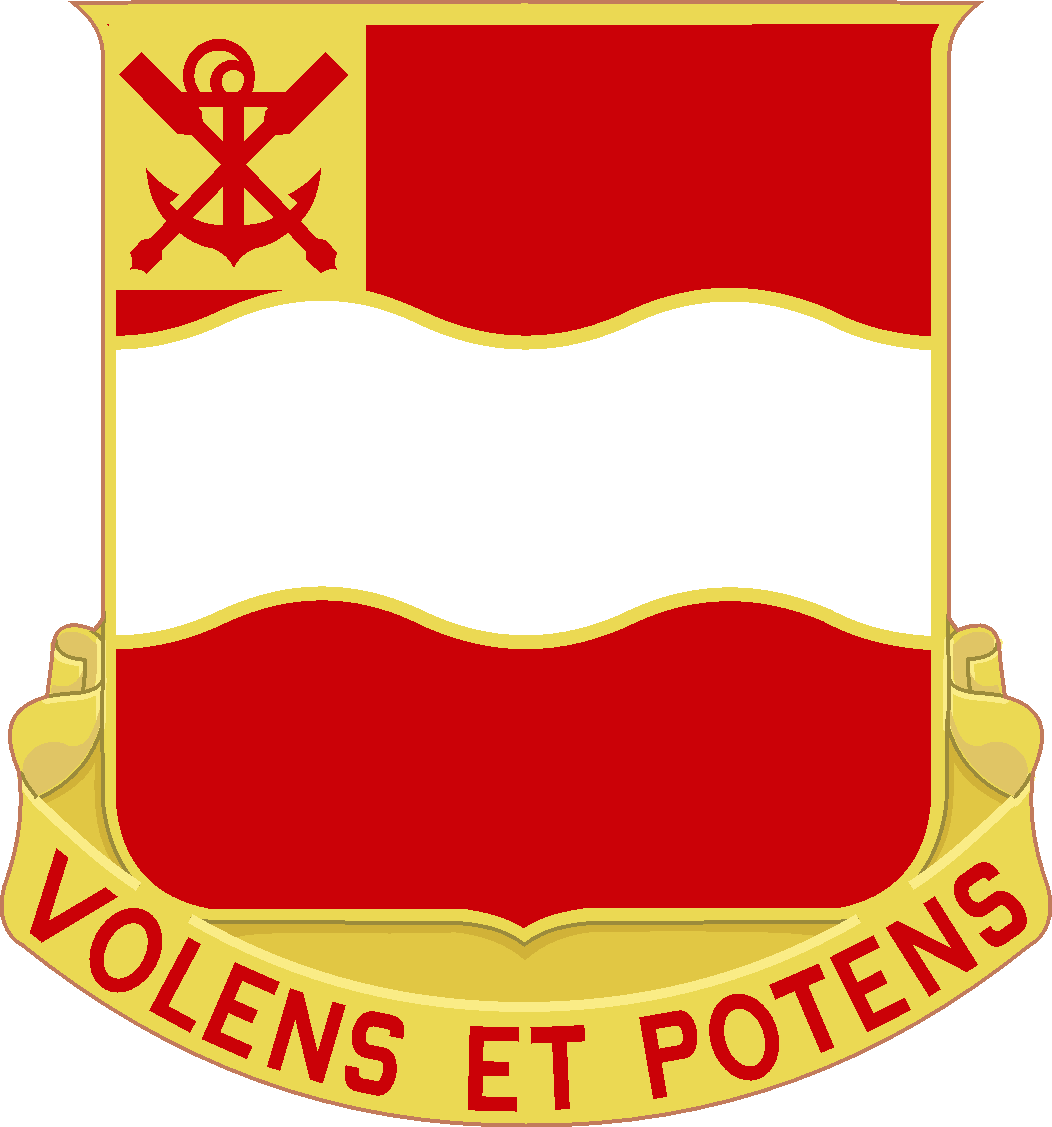
- Distinctive Unit Insignia

The 4th Engineer Battalion (the Vanguard of the 4th Division) is an engineer battalion of the United States Army. It is made up of combat engineers. The unit saw action in the American Civil War, World War I, World War II, Vietnam War, and the global war on terrorism, to include Operation Iraqi Freedom and Operation Enduring Freedom.

== Coat of arms ==
=== Blazon ===
- Shield: Gules, a fess wavy Argent, on a canton Or an anchor debruised by two oars in saltire of the field.
- Crest: From a wreath Argent and Gules a dexter cubit arm mailed Proper grasping four arrows Gules armed and feathered Argent.
- Motto: "VOLENS ET POTENS" (Willing and Able).

=== Symbolism ===
- Shield: Scarlet and white are the colors of the Corps of Engineers.
  The wavy fess alludes to the outstanding feat accomplished by the organization in World War I, in which the regiment bridged the Vesle under heavy fire, making possible the forcing of the passage by the Division.
  The yellow canton, representative of the color of the Engineers' facing when the old companies of the regiment were organized in 1861, refers to the 2nd Engineers, from which the 4th Engineers was organized in 1916.
  The device on the canton was the badge of the Engineers and Pontoniers of the American Civil War.
- Crest: The mailed hand and arrows are indicative of the combat capabilities of the unit, the number of arrows corresponding to the numerical designation of the battalion.
- Background: The coat of arms was originally approved for the 4th Engineer Regiment on 21 January 1921.
  It was redesignated for the 4th Engineer Battalion on 4 December 1940.

== Distinctive unit insignia ==
- Description: A Gold metal and enamel device 1 1/8 inches (2.9 cm) in height overall consisting of a shield blazoned: Gules a fess wavy Argent; on a canton Or an anchor debruised by two oars in saltire of the field. Attached below the shield is a Gold scroll inscribed "VOLENS ET POTENS" in red letters.
- Symbolism: Scarlet and white are the colors of the Corps of Engineers.
  The wavy fess alludes to the outstanding feat accomplished by the organization in World War I, in which the regiment bridged the Vesle under heavy fire, making possible the forcing of the passage by the Division.
  The yellow canton, representative of the color of the Engineers' facing when the old companies of the regiment were organized in 1861, refers to the 2nd Engineers, from which the 4th Engineers was organized in 1916.
  The device on the canton was the badge of the Engineers and Pontoniers of the Civil War.
- Background: The distinctive unit insignia was originally approved for the 4th Regiment Engineers on 18 February 1927.
  It was redesignated for the 4th Engineer Battalion on 5 December 1940.

== Formation and early history ==
The battalion was organized 31 December 1861 in the Regular Army at Washington, D.C., from new and existing companies of engineers as a provisional engineer battalion. The battalion participated in major campaigns and battles in the American Civil War to include: Peninsula Campaign (March 1862), Battle of Antietam (September 1862), Battle of Fredericksburg (December 1862), Battle of Chancellorsville (April 1863), Battle of the Wilderness (May 1864), Battle of Spotsylvania Court House (May 1864), Cold Harbor (June 1864), Siege of Petersburg (June 1864-March 1865), and the Confederate surrender after the Battle of Appomattox Court House (April 1865). It was constituted 28 July 1866 as the Battalion of Engineers. The battalion also participated in the War with Spain at the Battle of Santiago in July 1898 and the Philippine Insurrection in 1899. The battalion was then expanded 14 March-7 June 1901 to form the 1st and 2nd Battalions of Engineers.

== The Great War and World War II ==
The 2nd Battalion of Engineers was further expanded, reorganized and redesignated during July 1916 as the 2nd Regiment of Engineers. The unit was expanded yet again during May and June 1917 to form the 2nd, 4th, and 5th Regiments of Engineers. The 4th Regiment of Engineers was redesignated as the 4th Engineers in August 1917 and was, thereafter, assigned to the 4th Division in January 1918. The 4th Engineers deployed to France in support of the Western Front by participating in campaigns within the European theater. Such campaigns included: Aisne-Marne (Summer 1918), Battle of Saint-Mihiel (September 1918), Meuse-Argonne Offensive (Fall of 1918), and November 1918 in Alsace-Lorraine. After occupation service, the unit was inactivated in 1921 at Camp Lewis, Washington. Between 1927 and 1933 the unit was reassigned to support the 6th Division and six years later it was redesignated as the 4th Engineer Battalion activated (less Company A, which activated 24 July 1922 at Fort Bragg, North Carolina) 1 June 1940 at Fort Benning, Georgia. Reorganizations and redesignations led first as the 4th Engineer Motorized Battalion (September 1942) then the 4th Engineer Combat Battalion (August 1943) were formed. In January 1944, the battalion arrived in England to prepare for deployment to Normandy, France. On 6 June 1944 the battalion deployed to Normandy as part of Operation Overlord. After the Normandy invasion, the battalion continued across western Europe and participated in campaigns such as Northern France, the Rhineland, Ardennes-Alsace, and Central Europe. Soon after World War II ended, the unit was inactivated 19 February 1946 at Camp Butner, North Carolina. This did not last long however, with reactivation on 6 July 1948 at Fort Ord, California and subsequent redesignation as the 4th Engineer Battalion in June 1953.

== Vietnam War ==
The 4th Engineer Battalion was activated for deployment in July 1966 to the Vietnam War from Fort Lewis, Washington, as the Vanguard of the 4th Infantry Division, and assigned to support the 1st Brigade 8th Infantry. Company A was sent to Pleiku, Vietnam via ship on the MST Gordan and later units on the Buckner, flying from SEATEC on 7 July 1966, to Oakland Naval Shipyard, and then transported to, via San Diego to pick up 3500 Marines, then on to Japan, (Sgt E-6 and above in Japan, overnight some got passes), and then to Qui Nhơn, we were able to secure a palette of beer, and mess food, and other misc supplies and trucked to Pleiku by our squad platoon of dump trucks. We were then airlifted to Camp Holloway, Pleiku, by Caribou Aircraft. Then the battalion was driven by rough terrain buses to Dragon Mountain and into a huge area of four square miles, in for personnel and heavy equipment, beached landed and then headed north up Highway 1 and convoyed to Tuy Hòa and built the 2nd Brigade of the 8th Infantry 4th ID Base Camp. The company was then assigned simultaneously, to operations (laterite pit, hard clay like substance, used for road base), at Tuy Hòa, and 350 km back up to order to start securing and building up construction of base camp for the arrival of the 4th Infantry Division in August 1966. This is the origin of it being named the "Vanguard of the 4th Division". This base camp was named Camp Enari after the 1st officer, Lieutenant Enari, to be killed.

=== Further operations ===
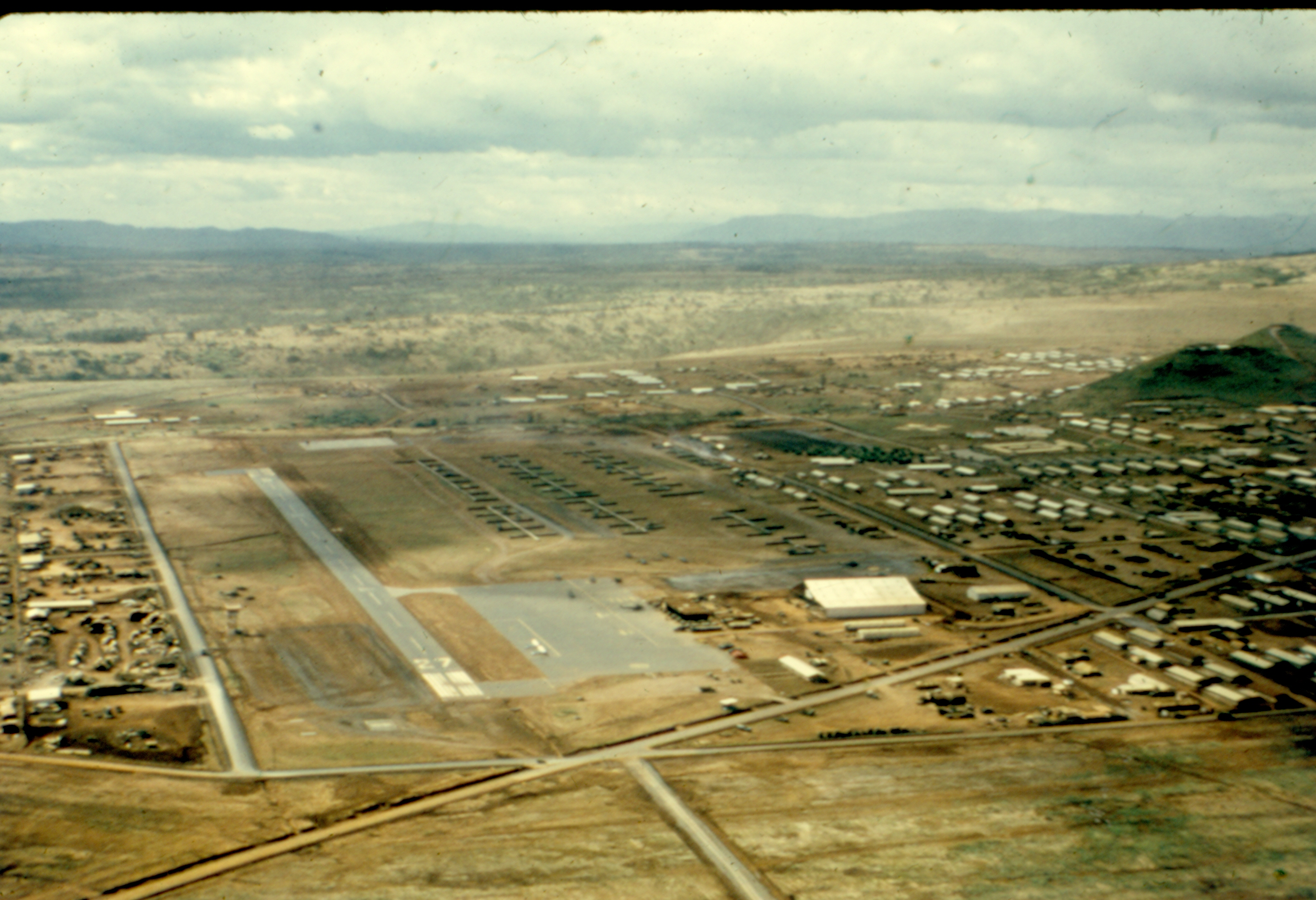
The 4th Infantry Division Base camp, known as Dragon Mountain on 2 December 1967. The 4th Engineer Battalion contributed to the construction of the 2000 ft. C-123 runway by laying down M8A1 matting.

The CO A, 4th Engineer Battalion convoyed back down to Qui Nhơn from Pleiku, then via LST transport Pleiku, Camp Enari, Hwy 1, Qui Nhơn, QL 6B, La Hai, and Phú Yên Province. There, it performed daily mine sweeps, repaired roads and bridges on Highways 1, 14 & 19 through the Central Highlands. After it had completed these tasks, the unit returned to Camp Enari. This task included mine-clearing and "jungle busting" with HD 16 Allis Chambers Bulldozers (replaced by the D-7E Caterpillar Bulldozers and M-48 tanks equipped with blades).

Later, the individual companies B, C, D, E, and F, of the battalion were assigned to ground operations in Tuy Hòa, Jackson Hole Vietnam, LZ Oasis, Đắk Tô, Đức Cơ, Plei Me, Kontum, Ban Me Thuot, Ia Drang Valley and Đức Phổ. Various Landing Zones (LZs) were built by the 4th Engineers: LZ Marylou near Kontum, LZ Oasis, and LZ Jackson Hole, LZ Duc Co, LZ Baldy, and others. Their operations there included activities concerning Tuy Hòa, La Hai, Polei Kleng, Bong Son and its enormous bridge, and the coastal town of Đức Phổ. Captain Knutzen, a West Point graduate, led the unit through a one-year tour with only one soldier reported as killed in action. The 4th Engineer Battalion participated in the intense combat of the Tet Offensive of 1968. It is often said that engineers are really "infantrymen with additional picks and shovels." This was certainly the case for the 4th Combat Engineers Battalion in Vietnam.

In November 1968, Charlie Company accompanied infantry units of the 4th division on "Operation Tollroad," designed to deter traffic down the Ho Chi Minh Trail. Deployed from Polei Kleng, the operation was completed in two legs; the first team started near the Ia Drang Valley, moved into Cambodia on the Trail and moved North until crossing into Laos. There they were relieved by the second team which continued North until 1 December. The operation blew bunkers, constructed abatis and performed other deterrent actions along the Trail. On Thanksgiving eve, Turkey dinner was delivered into Laos by helicopter.

Company A, 4th Engineer Battalion received two Presidential Unit Citations, 20 May 1967 Duc Co and Nove 19–23 1967 Dakto, they also received the Meritorious Unit Citation and Unit & Individual Vietnamese Gallantry Medals. They were shipped on the USMS Walker, from Oakland Terminal, to San Diego, to Kodak Japan, overnight stop, and landed at Qui Nhơn, and in-country from, 7 July 1966 to 6 June 1967. The colors were brought to their new home at Ft. Carson in 1971, and remain there, with CO A being deactivated on 12 December 2004.

=== Withdrawal ===
Some personnel of A Company departed Vietnam 30 days early and the rest with the rest of the battalion to follow within weeks, on 15 December 1970. The 4th Engineer Battalion was reflagged December 2004, at Ft. Carson, Inactivated 15 December 2004 at Fort Carson, Colorado, and relieved from assignment to the 4th Infantry Division. "A Company" The Vanguard, with two Presidential Unit Citations, with Oak Leaf Cluster, was deactivated, with the other companies reflagged as B, C, D, and F BCT units and with F being deployed to Iraq.

== Modern era ==
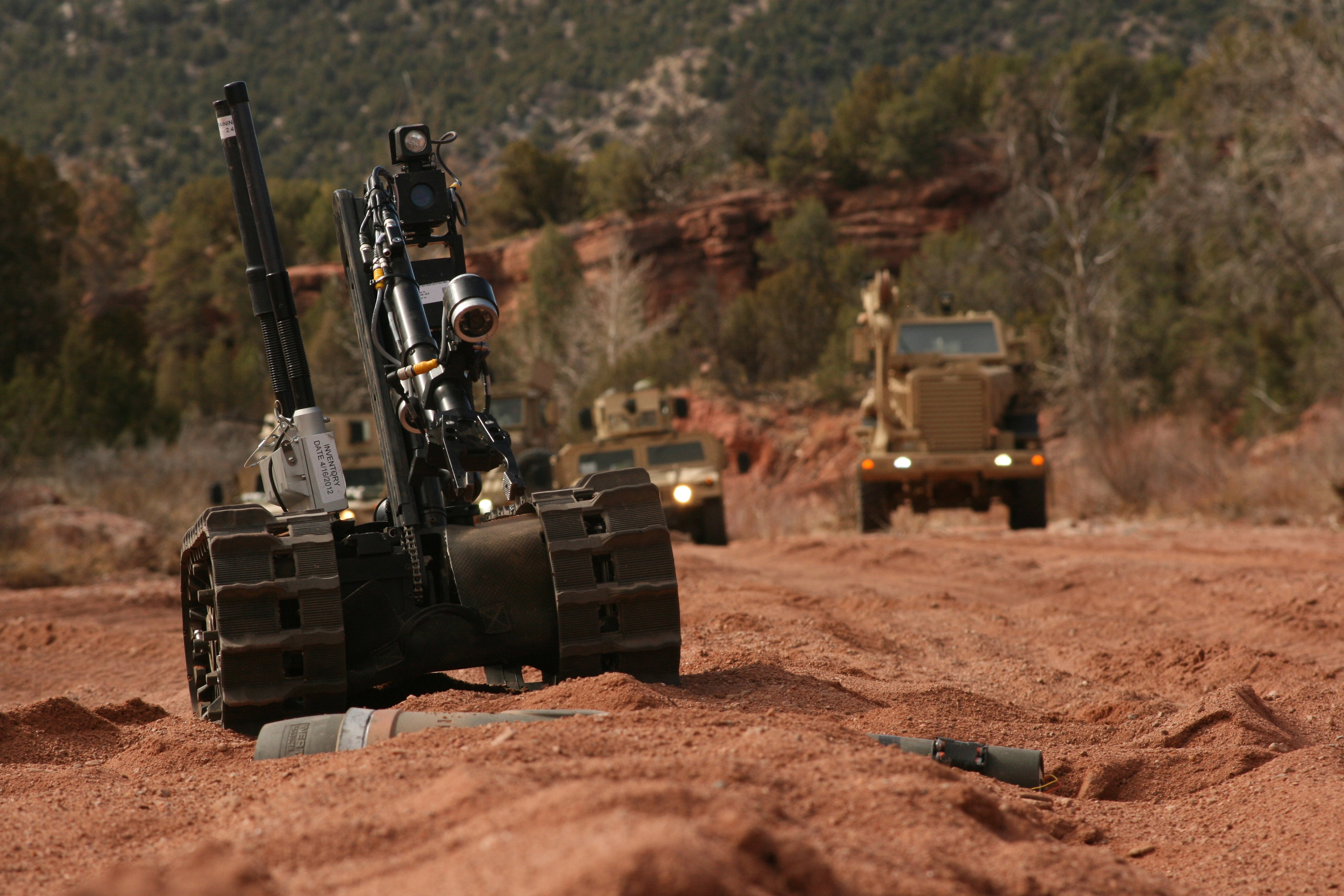
The Talon Robot examines ordnance during the 576th Engineer Company Field Training Exercise (FTX) at Camp Red Devil, Fort Carson in March 2013.

The 4th Engineer Battalion's Headquarters and Headquarters Company was reactivated 18 October 2006 at Fort Carson, Colorado. Additionally, the battalion consists of the 62nd Engineer Company (Sapper), 576th Engineer Company (Clearance), 41st Engineer Company ( Clearance), 569th Engineer Company (Mobility Augmentation), 615th Engineer Company (Construction) and a Forward Support Company. In February 2009, the battalion deployed in support of Operation Iraqi Freedom to Camp Liberty, Iraq. In early March, the battalion was reassigned to support Operation Enduring Freedom, and by late April, the entire battalion had arrived at Kandahar Airfield, Afghanistan. It was there that the battalion designated itself "Task Force THOR" and began route clearance operations across Regional Command South. The battalion supported Operation Enduring Freedom in RC-South for the next 10 months, redeploying to Fort Carson in February 2010.

The battalion's next involvement in the Global War on Terrorism resulted in the 62nd Engineer Company (Sapper) deployment in support of Operation Iraqi Freedom from August 2011 to December 2011, while, simultaneously, the 576th Engineer Company (Clearance) deployment in support of Operation Enduring Freedom from August 2011 to July 2012. The 569th Engineer Company (Mobility Augmentation) deployed in support of Operation Enduring Freedom from February 2012 to February 2013. Upon the 569th Engineer Company's return, the 62nd Engineer Company (Sapper) deployed to Afghanistan in support of Operation Enduring Freedom in February 2013 and await redeployment scheduled around November 2013. The battalion and its Forward Support Company recently deployed to Kandahar, Afghanistan located within Regional Command South in support of Operation Enduring Freedom in June 2013 and awaits redeployment scheduled in March 2014. In August 2013, the 576th Engineer Company (Clearance) deployed to Regional Command West to support Italian operations under Operation Enduring Freedom and returned in May 2014

As of August 2013, the 4th Engineer Battalion and its subsequent Engineer Companies, in support of both Operation Enduring Freedom and Operation Iraqi Freedom, currently has 28 months of continuous service in OIF and OEF with a combined total of 37 months during that 28-month period due to having multiple Engineer Companies deployed at the same time. Also, as of August 2013, the 4th Engineer Battalion has accrued more than 95 months of combined deployment time in support of the Global War on Terrorism from 2003 to 2013.

== Lineage ==
Year	Date	Event
1861	31 December	Organized in the Regular Army at Washington, D.C., from new and existing companies of engineers as a provisional engineer battalion (constituted 28 July 1866 as the Battalion of Engineers).
1901	14 March	Expanded to form the 1st and 2nd Battalions of Engineers (1st Battalion of Engineers—hereafter separate lineage).
1916	1 July	2nd Battalion of Engineers expanded, reorganized, and redesignated as the 2nd Regiment of Engineers.
1917	21 May	2nd Regiment of Engineers expanded to form the 2nd, 4th, and 5th Regiments of Engineers (2nd and 5th Regiments of Engineers—hereafter separate lineages).
1917	29 August	4th Regiment of Engineers redesignated as the 4th Engineer Regiment.
1918	1 January	Assigned to the 4th Division.
1918	May	Unit deployed to France with the 4th Division between, making use of the British Shipping Program.
1919	August	Unit returned to CONUS with the 4th Division.
1921	21 September	Unit Inactivated at Fort Lewis, Washington.
1922	24 July	Company A activated at Fort Bragg, North Carolina.
1927	15 August	Relieved from assignment to the 4th Division and assigned to the 6th Division.
1929	30 September	Company A inactivated.
1933	1 October	Relieved from assignment to the 6th Division and assigned to the 4th Division (later redesignated as the 4th Infantry Division) (Company A concurrently activated at Fort Benning, Georgia).
1939	19 October	Redesignated as the 4th Engineer Battalion.
1940	1 June	Activated (less Company A) at Fort Benning, Georgia.
1942	19 September	Reorganized and redesignated as the 4th Engineer Motorized Battalion.
1943	1 August	Reorganized and redesignated as the 4th Engineer Combat Battalion.
1944	18 January	Departed New York Port of Embarkation.
1944	29 January	Arrived in England started to prepare for Deployment.
1944	6 June	Unit Deployed to Normandy and entered Combat in the Normandy Campaign.
1944	24 July	Normandy Campaign concluded.
1944	25 July	Northern France Campaign started.
1944	14 September	Northern France Campaign concluded.
1944	15 September	Rhineland Campaign started.
1944	16 December	Unit was withdrawn from the Rhineland Campaign to engage in the Ardennes-Alsace Campaign.
1945	25 January	Ardennes-Alsace Campaign concluded. Unit resumed combat in Rhineland Campaign.
1945	21 March	Rhineland Campaign concluded.
1945	22 March	Central Europe Campaign started.
1945	11 May	Central Europe Campaign concluded.
1945	12 July	Unit returned to CONUS and located at Camp Butner, North Carolina.
1945	14 August	Unit was located at Camp Butner, which is when the war ended.
1946	19 February	Inactivated at Camp Butner, North Carolina.
1948	6 July	Activated at Fort Ord, California.
1953	5 June	Redesignated as the 4th Engineer Battalion.
1966	7 July	Arrived in Vietnam. The battalion had its headquarters collocated with the 4th Infantry Division at Pleiku.
1968	March	The battalion moved its headquarters to Dak To.
1968	April	The battalion moved its headquarters back to Pleiku.
1970	March	The battalion split its headquarters, with some elements located at Pleiku, with the rest at An Khê.
1970	April	The battalion consolidated its headquarters at An Khê.
1970	15 December	Unit returned to CONUS.
2003	April	The battalion deployed to Iraq in support of Operation Iraqi Freedom.
2004	February	The battalion redeployed to Ft. Carson, Colorado.
2004	15 December	Inactivated at Fort Carson, Colorado, and relieved from assignment to the 4th Infantry Division.
2006	18 October	Headquarters and Headquarters Company activated at Fort Carson, Colorado (Support Company concurrently constituted and activated).
2009	February	The battalion deployed to Baghdad, Iraq in support of Operation Iraqi Freedom.
2009	April	The battalion moved to Kandahar, Afghanistan to support Operation Enduring Freedom.
2010	February	The battalion redeployed to Ft. Carson, Colorado, having completed a twelve-month route clearance deployment to Iraq and Afghanistan in support of the Global War on Terror.
2011	August	The 62nd Engineer Company deployed to Iraq in support of Operation Iraqi Freedom and the 576th Engineer Company deployed to Afghanistan in support of Operation Enduring Freedom.
2011	December	The 62nd Engineer Company redeployed to Fort Carson, Colorado, after a 5-month deployment to Iraq.
2012	February	The 569th Engineer Company deployed to Afghanistan in support of Operation Enduring Freedom.
2012	July	The 576th Engineer Company redeployed to Fort Carson, Colorado, after a 12-month deployment to Afghanistan.
2013	February	The 569th Engineer Company redeployed to Fort Carson, Colorado, after being deployed 12 months to Afghanistan. Also within the same month, the 62nd Engineer Company deployed to Kandahar, Afghanistan in support of Operation Enduring Freedom.
2013	June	The 4th Engineer Battalion, its Headquarters and Headquarters Company, and a Forward Support Company deployed to Kandahar, Afghanistan in support of Operation Enduring Freedom.
2013	August	The 576th Engineer Company deployed to Regional Command West (RC-W), Afghanistan in support of Operation Enduring Freedom.
2017	March	The 576th Engineer Company deployed to South Korea for a 9-month rotation.

== Honors ==
=== Campaign participation credit ===
American Civil War

Peninsula Antietam Fredericksburg Chancellorsville Wilderness Spotsylvania Cold Harbor Petersburg Appomattox

Spanish–American War

Santiago

Philippine Insurrection

Streamer w/o inscription

World War I

Aisne-Marne St. Mihiel Meuse-Argonne Champagne 1918 Lorraine 1918

World War II

Normandy Northern France Rhineland Ardennes-Alsace Central Europe

Vietnam War

Counteroffensive, II Counteroffensive, III Tet Counteroffensive Counteroffensive, IV Counteroffensive, V Counteroffensive, VI Tet 69/Counteroffensive Summer-Fall 1969 Winter-Spring 1970 Sanctuary 1970 Counteroffensive, VII

Global War on Terrorism

- Operation Enduring Freedom

Consolidation II Consolidation III Transition I

- Operation Iraqi Freedom

Liberation of Iraq Transition of Iraq Iraqi Sovereignty

=== Decorations ===
World War II

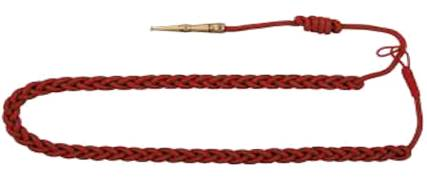
Belgian Fourragère 1940

- Cited in the Order of the Day of the Belgian Army for action in BELGIUM
- Cited in the Order of the Day of the Belgian Army for action in the ARDENNES

Presidential Unit Citation (Army) for HURTGEN FOREST 1944

Vietnam War

Meritorious Unit Commendation (Army) for VIETNAM 1967–1968

Republic of Vietnam Cross of Gallantry with Palm for VIETNAM 1966–1969

Republic of Vietnam Cross of Gallantry with Palm for VIETNAM 1969–1970

Republic of Vietnam Civil Action Honor Medal, First Class for VIETNAM 1966–1969

- Company A additionally entitled:

Presidential Unit Citation (Army) for PLEIKU PROVINCE

Presidential Unit Citation (Army) for DAK TO DISTRICT

- Company C additionally entitled:

Valorous Unit Award for QUANG NGAI PROVINCE

Republic of Vietnam Cross of Gallantry with Palm for VIETNAM 1966–1967

Global War on Terrorism

Valorous Unit Award, Streamer embroidered IRAQ 2003-2004

Valorous Unit Award, SOUTHERN AFGHANISTAN 2009-2010

== Notable members ==
- Roshara Sanders
