= Matt Levine =

Matt Levine or Matthew Levine may refer to:

- Matt Levine (entrepreneur), American entrepreneur and restaurateur
- Matt Levine (columnist), writer for Bloomberg News

== See also ==
- Matthew Levin (disambiguation)
