= Matthew Levin =

Matthew Levin may refer to:

- Matt Levin, American racing driver
- Matthew Levin (chef), American celebrity chef
- Matthew Levin (diplomat), Canadian diplomat

== See also ==
- Matthew Levine (disambiguation)
