= Ricky Moore (chef) =

American chef

- Education: The Culinary Institute of America
- Occupation: Chef

Ricky Moore is an American chef who owns Saltbox Seafood Joint in Durham, North Carolina. He won the James Beard Foundation Award for Best Chef: Southeast in 2022

== Early life, education, and military service ==
Ricky Moore was born at Marine Corps Air Station Cherry Point, and by the age of seven had lived in Germany, Kentucky, and Texas because of his father's military career. Moore was exposed to German cooking when he lived in Europe. Growing up in New Bern, he fished and crabbed, and wanted to become an artist. In high school, a home economics class helped from discover his passion for cooking.

Moore graduated from New Bern High School in 1987, then enlisted in the military at the age of 18. He was initially a paratrooper and later served as a cook in the United States Army. After seven years in the army, he graduated from The Culinary Institute of America in 1994.

== Career ==
Following his culinary education, Moore interned and worked in commercial kitchens in Asia (Singapore), Europe, the Middle East, and North America. Restaurants have included Charlie Trotter's, Equinox and Frontera Grill, IndeBleu, Le Tarbouche, Lespinasse, Tru (Chicago), and Vidalia. In France, Moore worked at Apicius with Jean-Pierre Vigato and Le Violin d'Ingres with Christian Constant in Paris, as well as Le Cerf with Michel Husser in Alsace. He also worked Cuisine of India with Shishir Sharma in Toronto. In New York, he interned at Daniel in Manhattan and the Westchester Country Club in the Hudson Valley. In North Carolina, he worked at Glasshalfull in Carrboro and was the first executive chef at Giorgio's in Cary.

Moore has been an instructor at the Washburne Culinary Institute's Parrot Cage Restaurant and executive chef of Kimpton Hotels & Restaurants' South Water Kitchen. He was executive chef of Agraia in Washington, D.C., as of 2007. Moore competed against Michael Symon on Iron Chef America, and has been featured in the magazines Garden & Gun, Our State, and Travel + Leisure. He is the owner of Saltbox Seafood Joint, which originally opened in Durham, North Carolina in 2012. Moore published his first cookbook (Saltbox Seafood Joint Cookbook) in 2019. According to Tina Adkins of the Sun Journal, the book has 60 recipes "celebrating his coastal culinary heritage". He also filmed the documentary miniseries The Hook for the public broadcasting network PBS North Carolina.

Moore was named a "local food champion" by the North Carolina Local Food Council in 2019. In 2020, he was a James Beard Foundation Award semi-finalist in the Best Chef: Southeast category. He also received $25,000 as part of the foundation's '#EatItForward' campaign for Black-owned restaurateurs. Moore won the James Beard Foundation Award for Best Chef: Southeast in 2022. Additionally, he has been named "Best Chef in the Triangle" by Indy Week.

In 2025, Moore was named a semifinalist of the James Beard Foundation's Outstanding Chef award.

== Personal life ==
Moore and his wife Norma have been married for 30 years and live in Chapel Hill, as of 2022. The couple met while Moore was stationed in Hawaii, and have two children (daughter Hunter and son Greyson). Moore displays a collection of filet knives from around the world in his kitchen.

== Publications ==
- Moore, Ricky (August 19, 2019). Saltbox Seafood Joint Cookbook. UNC Press Books. ISBN 9781469653549.

== See also ==
- List of Culinary Institute of America alumni
- List of people from North Carolina
