= David Shalleck =

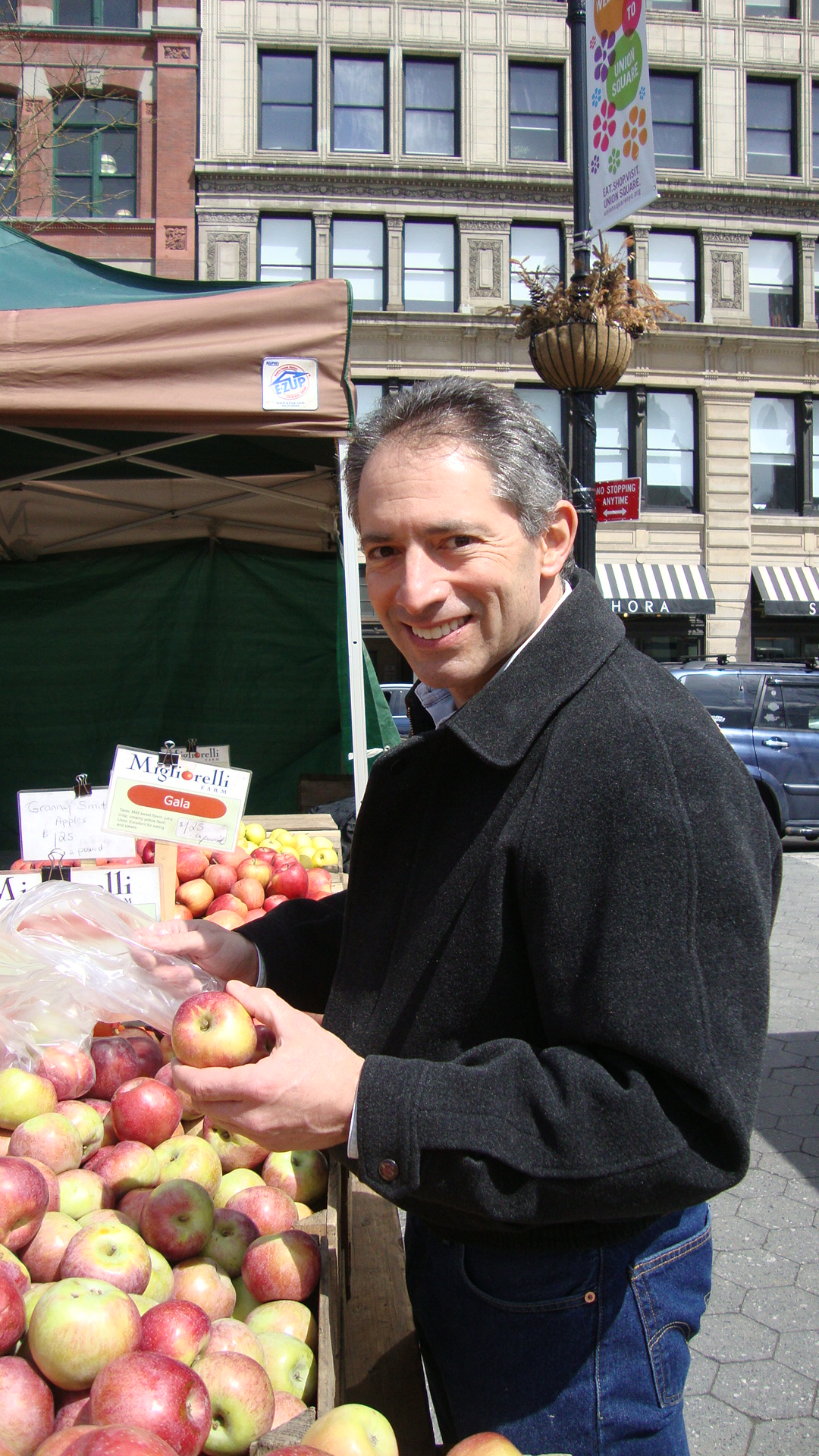
- Chef David Shalleck at Union Sq. Market, New York
- Born: New York City
- Education: Syracuse University
- Culinary career
- Cooking style: Italian, French & Western Mediterranean Cuisine
- Television show(s): Jacques Pépin: More Fast Food My Way José Made in Spain
- Award(s) won: Cordon d'Or Culinary Academy Award USA Book News Award 2007
- Website: http://www.volochef.com/

David Shalleck is a chef, culinary producer, and author. He has worked in restaurants and at events in New York, San Francisco, California's Napa Valley, London, Provence and various regions of Italy. Specializing in coastal Italian, French and Western Mediterranean cuisine, Shalleck has worked on the television productions for chefs such as Jacques Pépin and Cat Cora. His culinary travel memoir, Mediterranean Summer: A Season on France's Cote d'Azur and Italy's Costa Bella was published in 2007.

== Chef & Culinary Producer ==
With a BFA degree in Set and Lighting Design from Syracuse University, Shalleck started his career in New York City as an associate designer at Imero Fiorentino Associates, a television and stage lighting design firm. At the same time, he also worked under Chef Larry Forgione at An American Place restaurant during the early 1980s while the American food revolution was emerging. After a move to San Francisco, he then became the Culinary Director for retail and media company, NapaStyle, based in the Napa Valley, California. It was from this position he was able to create VOLOCHEF Culinary Solutions in 2003.

== Television shows ==
Shalleck has worked in culinary production services for over 250 television shows including the PBS series Jacques Pépin: More Fast Food My Way (based on the 2004 book of the same name) and Essential Pépin both of which were produced by KQED-TV in San Francisco (currently broadcast on PBS Create Channel) as well as José Made in Spain with Chef José Andrés and for Chef's Story at the French Culinary Institute. He has also appeared with Cat Cora on the Food Network's Iron Chef America.

== Author ==
Shalleck is also the author of the culinary travel memoir and a 2007 New York Times summer reading pick, Mediterranean Summer. New York Times literary critic Janet Maslin ranked Mediterranean Summer number 4 (of 11) on her “Hot List" Maslin wrote that it "is a book-sized vacation." Co-written by Erol Munuz, the book chronicles David's work as a Chef while aboard an Italian sailing yacht from Saint-Tropez in France to Positano on Italy's Amalfi Coast. The culinary travelogue / memoir was published by Broadway Books, an imprint of Random House, Inc. and features a foreword by Mario Batali, as well as numerous recipes and wine pairing recommendations by Sergio Esposito, owner of Italian Wine Merchants. The book received accolades from literary critics, chefs, magazines and bloggers alike. The paperback edition, now in its seventh print, has been published in several foreign languages and is also available in several e-Book editions.

== Awards & honors ==
In 2008 Mediterranean Summer won the Cordon d'Or Culinary Academy Awards in the Literature/Memoir category. It also caught the attention of the USA Book News Awards where it won best Travel Essay in 2007.

== Today ==
David Shalleck continues to oversee his company VOLOCHEF. He is also active in several professional and charitable organizations. Shalleck is the exclusive culinary consultant to Windstar Cruises where he has designed Mediterranean-inspired menus for its flagship restaurant Degrees on the MSY Wind Surf. He is also the American spokesperson for the French professional cookware line; Mauviel. Shalleck serves on the Culinary Advisory Board for the Mediterranean Food Alliance. He is also a member of the Chef's Council for the Center for Culinary Development and a speaker on the food & culture circuit.In addition, Shalleck is a Taste Guru for local San Francisco e-commerce start-up that sells artisanal food, Delicious Karma where he shares his opinions and reviews on the products. He lives in San Francisco.
