= Saltbox Seafood Joint =

Seafood restaurant in Durham, North Carolina, U.S.

- Interactive map of Saltbox Seafood Joint

Restaurant information
- Established: 2012
- Owner: Ricky Moore
- Chef: Ricky Moore
- Food type: Seafood
- Location: 2637 Durham-Chapel Hill Boulevard, Durham, North Carolina, 27707, United States
- Coordinates: 35.9741°N 78.9291°W

Saltbox Seafood Joint is a seafood restaurant in Durham, North Carolina. Chef–owner Ricky Moore established the business in the Old Five Points neighborhood in October 2012. He added a food truck in 2014 and opened a second larger brick and mortar restaurant in 2017. The original location closed in August 2021 with the expiration of a ten-year lease, and the business continues to operate on Durham-Chapel Hill Boulevard.

Saltbox Seafood Joint focuses on local fish and changes the menu daily. In addition to seafood staples like clams, crabs, oysters, and scallops, the restaurant has served fried cornmeal fritters called "Hush-Honeys" as well as special dishes to celebrate select holidays and observances such as Black History Month, National Hispanic Heritage Month, Thanksgiving, and Veterans Day. The business has received positive reviews, being named "Best New Restaurant" by The News & Observer and earning Moore a James Beard Foundation Award in the Best Chef: Southeast category in 2022.

== Description ==
Owned by Black chef Ricky Moore, Saltbox Seafood Joint (SSJ) is a seafood restaurant in Durham, North Carolina. The restaurant's exterior has a sign with the text "NC Seafood". According to Vanessa Real Williams of Indy Week, the restaurant is "shaped like a shrimp boat and painted an unexpected pastel green color—modern and fresh, like the restaurant itself". The front of the restaurant has large picture windows and the back walls have pine paneling. The interior also features exposed brick and a large poster of Moore's cookbook.

According to Addie Ladner of Walter Magazine, the chalkboard menu display is changed daily "based on what the tides bring in". Various fish have included amberjack, black drum, bluefish, butterfish, catfish, croakers, dogfish, flounder, herring, hogfish, king mackerel, mackerel, mullet, red drum, red snapper, ribbonfish, sheepshead, snowy grouper, spadefish, spot, striped bass, swordfish, tilefish, triggerfish, grey and speckled trout, tuna, white perch, and whiting. Shellfish have included bay scallops, blue crab, clams, oysters, shrimp, and soft-shell crab.

The oyster sandwich has fried oysters and cabbage fennel coleslaw on bread toasted in seafood butter. Oysters have also been paired with a dipping sauce which includes ketchup, mayonnaise, mustard, hot sauce, vinegar, salt, and pepper. The menu has included "Hush-Honeys", or fried cornmeal fritters described as "half hushpuppy, half zeppole (a fried Italian dessert), drizzled with spices and honey". Rolls, house-made chips with fried onions and green bell peppers, and various sides have also been served. The "good" tea is sweetened with simple syrup and has crushed ice.

== History ==
Inspired by the hawker stalls and street food of Singapore, Moore opened the original 205-square-foot restaurant in October 2012, in a former hot dog stand on North Mangum Street in Durham's Old Five Points neighborhood. He expanded the business with a food truck in 2014. As of 2015, Moore used chard, cucumbers, kale, potatoes, scallions, and tomatoes from the nearby urban garden Sweet Beet City Farm.

Moore opened a second 2,200-square-foot brick and mortar restaurant on Durham-Chapel Hill Boulevard in 2017. During the COVID-19 pandemic, he supported the use of face masks by patrons, and shared a message on social media criticizing those who refused to do so. Moore and SSJ received a $25,000 prize from Discover's Eat It Forward campaign, which celebrates and supports Black-owned businesses, in August 2020.

The Old Five Points restaurant closed on August 22, 2021, when the ten-year lease expired. SSJ's five employees were all women, as of 2022.

SSJ has served special dishes to commemorate select holidays and observances. On Veterans Day in 2020, the restaurant offered a "military-inspired" seafood variant of chipped beef. For Thanksgiving, the original restaurant served crab grits and the second location hosted a lobster roll social. In 2022, SSJ celebrated Black History Month by offering new dishes each Wednesday during the month of February. The specials, which Moore said commemorated the annual observance as well as the Pan-African influence of the Atlantic slave trade, included fried catfish and spaghetti, bake and shark, Senegalese fish yassa, and Moqueca Baiana (Brazilian fish stew). The restaurant has also celebrated National Hispanic Heritage Month.

== Reception ==
SSJ was named "Best New Restaurant" by The News & Observer. Jill Warren Lucas of Our State wrote, "it's not the press or even the word of mouth that keeps people coming back. The draw is simple: It's the taste and aroma of perfectly cooked, imaginatively seasoned, impeccably fresh fish." In 2013, Saveur editors said SSJ "fulfills our wildest fantasies of what a takeout fish shack can be".

The restaurant was included in Southern Living's 2014 list of "The South's Best Cheap Eats under $10". Eater included SSJ in a 2017 list of "The South's 38 Essential Restaurants". In 2020, D.G. Martin of The Pilot described the Hush-Honeys "a little salty, a little spicy, and a little sweet" and wrote, "They're the perfect complement to the best seafood you're liable to find anywhere, let alone in the middle of the Tar Heel State."

Adrian Miller included SSJ in Southern Living's 2021 overview of "The South's Best Soul Food" and recommended the grouper bites. Sarah Edwards of Indy Week said the restaurant "has accrued a well-deserved following over the years, with politicians factoring chef Ricky Moore's fried fish into campaign stops". SSJ was named "Best Seafood Restaurant in the Triangle" by readers of Indy Week in 2019, 2020, 2021, and 2022. The restaurant earned Moore a James Beard Foundation Award in the Best Chef: Southeast category in 2022. The News & Observer named him Tar Heel of the Year, which recognizes North Carolina residents "who have made a lasting and significant impact", in 2022.

== See also ==
- List of Black-owned restaurants
- List of seafood restaurants
