= Bullard-Havens Technical High School =

Bullard Havens Technical High School

Location
- 500 Palisade Avenue; Bridgeport, Connecticut 06610; United States; 41°11′55″N 73°09′54″W

Information
- Established: 1936
- CEEB code: 070050
- Principal: Susan Foss
- Grades: 9-12
- Enrollment: 818 (2023-2024)
- Colors: Black and orange
- Mascot: Tiger
- Website: bullard-havens.cttech.org

Bullard-Havens Technical High School, or Bullard-Havens Tech, is a technical high school, part of the Connecticut Technical Education and Career System. Located at the east end of Bridgeport, it serves the region of southwestern Connecticut. The school attracts students from all over the state due to its extensive Career and Technical Education programs and rigorous academics. Each student has the opportunity to participate in athletics, activities and Work-Based Learning programs.

== Technologies ==
In addition to a complete academic program leading to a high school diploma, students attending Bullard-Havens Tech receive training in one of the following trades and technologies:

- Automotive Technology
- Culinary Arts
- Carpentry
- Criminal Justice and Protective Services
- Electrical
- Graphic Design
- Hairdressing and Cosmetology
- Health Technology
- Masonry
- Information Technology
- Plumbing and Heating
- Precision Machining Technology
- Architecture

== Notable alumni ==
- Roshara Sanders
