= Oceana (restaurant) =

Restaurant in New York City

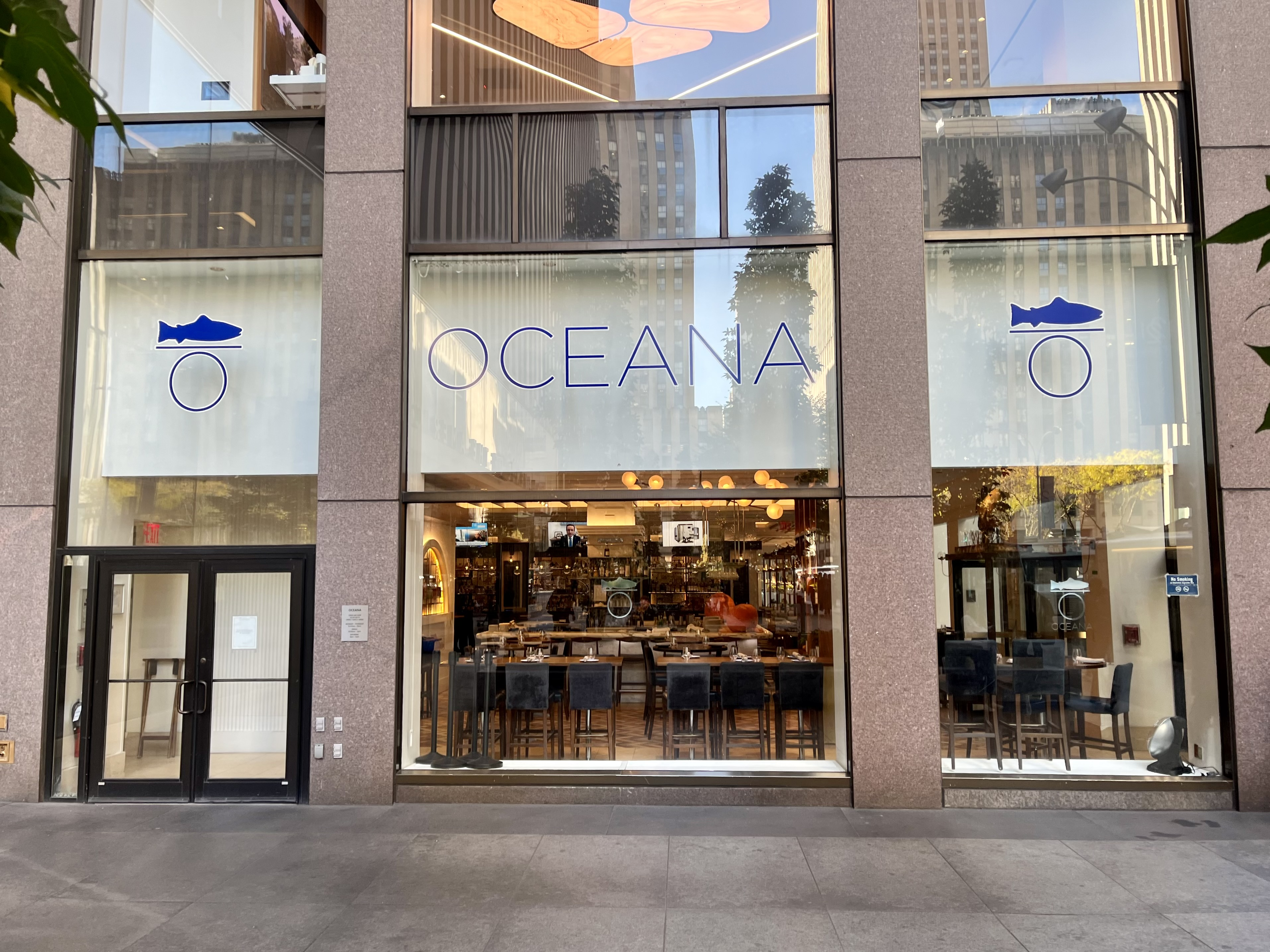
- Oceana in November 2023
- Interactive map of Oceana

Restaurant information
- Location: 120 West 49th Street, New York City, New York, 10020, United States
- Coordinates: 40°45′35.2″N 73°58′56.3″W
- Website: Official website

Oceana is a restaurant in New York City. The restaurant opened in 2009 and serves seafood.

== Notable staff ==
- Roshara Sanders

== See also ==
- List of Michelin-starred restaurants in New York City
- List of seafood restaurants
