= Franz Ignaz Pollinger =

Austrian painter

Franz Ignaz Pollinger was a mid-19th century Austrian painter. His work "Der erste Christbaum in Ried" (The first Christian tree in Ried) was completed in 1848. It depicts a Christmas celebration including mayor Josef Anton.
