= Roshara Sanders =

American culinary professional

- Born: 1989 or 1990 (age 36–37)
- Education: Bullard-Havens Technical High School; Culinary Institute of America
- Military career
- Allegiance: United States
- Branch: United States Army
- Unit: 4th Engineer Battalion
- Conflicts: War in Afghanistan; Iraq War

Roshara Sanders is an American chef and cooking instructor. In 2020 she became the first Black woman to teach in the culinary department at the Culinary Institute of America (CIA). In 2024 she was named to Food & Wine magazine's Game Changers list.

== Early life and education ==
Sanders was born and raised in Bridgeport, Connecticut. She has said her mother was addicted and homeless while pregnant with her and was offered a job by a local restaurateur to help her get off the streets. She has said she grew up in a house built by Habitat for Humanity.

Sanders graduated from Bullard-Havens Technical High School in Bridgeport in 2007 with a concentration in culinary. She was accepted to the CIA but was unable to afford tuition even with financial aid and decided to enlist in the army to fund her education. She served for six years in the 4th Engineer Battalion, including in Iraq and Afghanistan from 2009 to 2010, and in the 395th Combat Sustainment Support Battalion. After a roommate who had encouraged her to pursue her culinary interests was murdered by another soldier, Sanders enrolled at CIA under the Post-9/11 Veterans Educational Assistance Act of 2008, commonly referred to as the GI Bill. She graduated in 2014 with a Culinary Arts Business Management BPS.

Sanders is gay.

== Career ==
Sanders worked in restaurants in Connecticut and became chef de partie at Oceana in Manhattan.

In 2016 she was named to the inaugural class of NBCBLK28 as one of 28 trailblazers under the age of 28. In 2017 she was named a celebrity ambassador for Habitat for Humanity and was the National Restaurant Association Educational Foundation's 2017 Faces of Diversity Award winner. In 2018 she created a Veterans Day dinner at the James Beard House and was named a Forbes 30 Under 30 fellow.

In 2020, when she was 29, Sanders became the first Black woman to teach in the culinary department at The Culinary Institute of America (CIA).

In 2024 Food & Wine named Sanders, along with fellow CIA instructor Rupa Bhattacharya, to their list of seventeen "Game Changers" who were "shaping the future of food".

=== Television ===
In 2015 she won an episode of Chopped. In 2025 she was a team mentor on Next Gen Chef.
