= Matt Levine (entrepreneur) =

American fashion designer

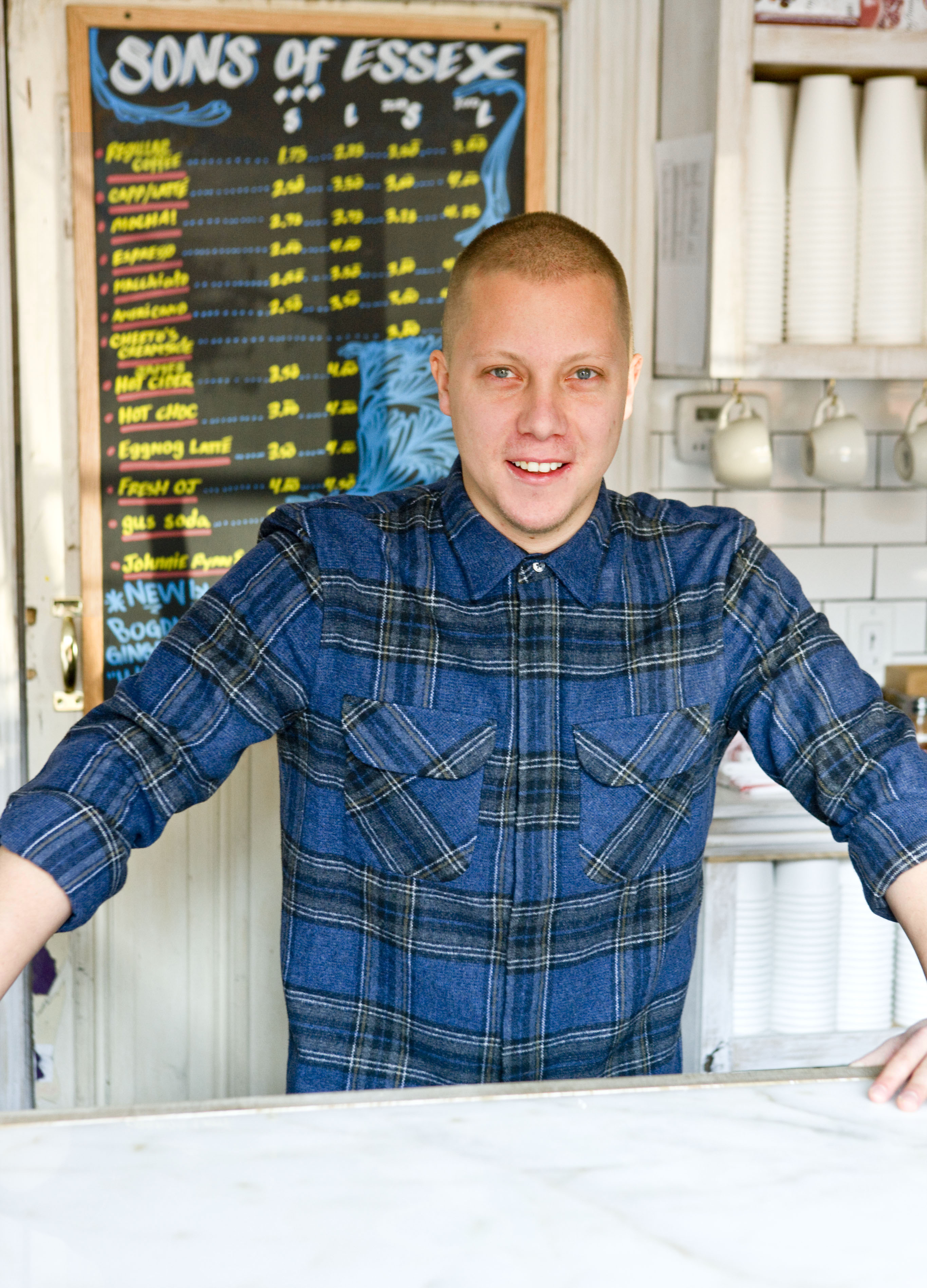
- Born: February 17, 1982 (age 44); Long Island, New York, United States
- Occupation: Entrepreneur

Matt Levine (born February 17, 1982) is an American entrepreneur, founder of Chlorophyll Water and Matcha Mama Tulum, former restaurateur known for his ventures in hospitality, nutrition and wellness.

== Early life and career ==
Prior to founding Chlorophyll Water, Levine had been a restaurateur, known for his gluten-free, organic, locally sourced, low carbon footprint, sustainable, vegetarian and vegan restaurants “as a way to help local farms and build a sense of community".

Levine has been labeled as “Lord of Local” by WWD, awarded “Best Display of Marketing Genius” by the Village Voice, and was selected as one of Vanity Fair's #VF500, Top 500 most influential people in 2017.

Levine previously owned and operated the farm to table New York restaurant, Chalk Point Kitchen and fresh pressed elixir cocktail bar, The Handy Liquor Bar in New York City. While Levine's companies operated the Food and Beverage at The hotel on Rivington, W New York Times Square and Walk Hotel Greenwich Village.

Previously, Levine was the owner of the Lower East Side Manhattan lounge, The Eldridge, and creator of Steelo', a high-end men's clothing collection.

== Business ==
=== Steelo' ===
Steelo', created by Levin in 2004 and dismantled in 2008, was a men's clothing collection sold in various high-end boutiques, such as Beam Japans, Holt Renfrew Canada Fred Segal Los Angeles, and Atrium New York voted one of the "Top 20 Brands in the World" by the World Global Style Network. Steelo' apparel has been featured in People and OK! magazines as well in a series of other men's publications and red carpet events.

=== The Eldridge ===
Opened by Levine in 2008, the Eldridge is a bar/lounge on the Lower East Side of New York City. The lounge has since received a lot of press regarding its exclusivity, with Fox News calling it a "club that even famous people can't get into." Reportedly only 400 of Levine's most esteemed acquaintances received "VIP admission cards." Known for its live music, celebrity patrons, lavish interior, and used bookstore exterior, The Eldridge has been both praised and criticized for its stringent door policies. In 2008, the Eldridge was voted "Best Display of Marketing Genius" by The Village Voice.

=== Chalk Point Kitchen ===
Levine opened up Chalk Point Kitchen in 2013, a “healthy” and “hip SoHo restaurant specializing in vegan food" with a commitment to “sustainability and sourcing ingredients locally" with a focus on community. Chalk Point Kitchen was the first restaurants in Manhattan to establish Gender Neutral Bathrooms.

Chalk Point Kitchen (2013-2018) was known for "reinventing farm to table fare" and became the premiere farm to table restaurant in New York City, known for its “local, seasonal, sustainable and organic foods”, ranking #1 overall on TripAdvisor out of 12,009 in 2016 and ranked No. 1 vegetarian restaurant in 2016 and 2017.

The menu was awarded “World’s Hottest Destination for Vegans” by CNN,

Chalk Point Kitchen also received “a rare 10 out of 10 review” from Manhattan Digest.

=== Chlorophyll Water ===
Chlorophyll Water was founded by Matt Levine in 2019. Is a purified water beverage enhanced with the addition of Chlorophyll. Green Business Bureau defined it as “Good for the Mind, the Body, and the Planet"

Chlorophyll Water is bottled in landfill biodegradable bottles, “designed to eliminate pollution, reduce GHG emissions and recover clean renewable energy".

During COVID-19, Chlorophyll Water donated bottled water to medical workers, homeless and senior citizen centers.

Chlorophyll Water set up a donation platform where they donate bottled water to those in need of hydration through their partnerships with ACE New York Programs for the Homeless, Bowery Mission, and Hillside Food Outreach.
