= Cigala =

Cigala is a surname. Notable people with this surname include:

- Alfonso Cigala Fulgosi (1884 –1943), Italian general during World War II
- Giuseppe Cigala Fulgosi (1910 – 1977), Italian naval officer during World War II
- Giovanni Cigala (1622–1687), Greek Cypriot academician and philosopher
- Lanfranc Cigala (or Cicala) (fl. 1235–1257), Genoese nobleman, knight, judge, and man of letters
- Giovanni Cigala (1805–1857), harpsichordist and choir master of the theater in Zadar

== See also ==
- Diego el Cigala (born 1968), a Romani Flamenco gypsy singer
