= Emel Başdoğan =

Turkish chef

Emel Başdoğan (born 26 March 1960) is a Turkish celebrity chef, author of cooking and baking books, and media personality known for her television shows and publications. She was a judge on the television programme Ver Fırına, the Turkish version of the Great British Bake Off for 170 episodes.

== Early life ==
Emel Başdoğan was born in Istanbul, Turkey. She graduated from Deutsche Schule Istanbul and continued her further education in biology and sociology at Boğaziçi University, Istanbul and Nanterre University in Paris, As well as philosophy and cinema at the University of Vienna. For the last twenty years she has been the host and the editor of various TV shows focused on cooking, baking and weight control which are broadcast at major TV channels of Turkey.

== Career ==
She has been the host and editor of a variety of TV shows focused on cooking, caking, and weight loss, which have been broadcast in Turkey. In 1994, Emel Başdoğan became the gastronomic editor for the first cooking program in Turkey “A La Luna”. In 1995, she published and co-owned the first cooking magazine of Turkey, in cooperation with Gruner Jahr/Prizma Press of Germany. Again in 1995 she published a baking encyclopedia, viz. “Proser Akademi” in cooperation with Teubner Publication House, which aimed at training bakers. In 1997, she attended the Culinary Institute of America, and became one of the first eight certificated food stylists in the world. She founded "Foodie by Emel Başdoğan" in 1997, the boutique bakery of which she is the chef and the owner. “Foodie by E.B. “ introduced Turkey the concept of special occasion cakes besides tea-time treats with non-industrial ingredients. The differentiation point of "Foodie by Emel Başdoğan" is less sugar, no artificial additives. In 1998, she founded Başdoğan Publications, which specializes in gastronomic books.

In cooperation with companies like Marsa, Suchard, Kraft, Unilever, Tefal and Anadolu Holding, she has written eight cook books. In 2005, she wrote the first special occasion cakes book in Turkey, published by one of the oldest and prestigious publication houses of the country, İnkılâp Publishing House. In 2011 she worked with GlaxoSmithKline, in efforts to raise awareness about weight management.

== TV shows ==
1997-2000- she produced the gastronomic content, and presented the daily show about nutrition and lifestyle "Sen Herseyi Düşünürsün" in collaboration with Tefal.

2000-2001- she produced the gastronomic content and presented the daily show about nutrition and life style "Yoksa Siz Hala?" in collaboration with Marsa. The main focus of the show was weight control.

2010- she designed the content and presented the daily cooking and baking show "Emel Başdoğan ile Tam Tadında".

2014-2015- she was the judge of the Great British Bake Off/Turkey for the first 170 episodes.

Controlling weight while eating healthy and tasty have been the main themes of her TV shows, focusing on topics such as family life, parenting, partnership and relations at the same time.

== Books ==
- A La Luna Yemekler 1 (November 1995)
- A La Luna Yemekler 2 (September 1996)
- Sen Her Şeyi Düşünürsün 1 (March 1998)
- Yudum'la Hafifleyen Yemekler (August 1998)
- Sen Her Şeyi Düşünürsün 2 (August 1998)
- Birali Yemekler (1998 )
- Sen Her Şeyi Düşünürsün 3 (May 1999)
- Sen Her Şeyi Düşünürsün 4 (August 2000)
- Foodie Emel Başdoğan'la Pasta Yapımı (2005)
- Hayat Zayıflarken de Güzel (2018)
