= Camp Enari =

Former U.S. Army base in Vietnam

Camp Enari (Hensel Airfield)
- Pleiku, Central Highlands in Vietnam
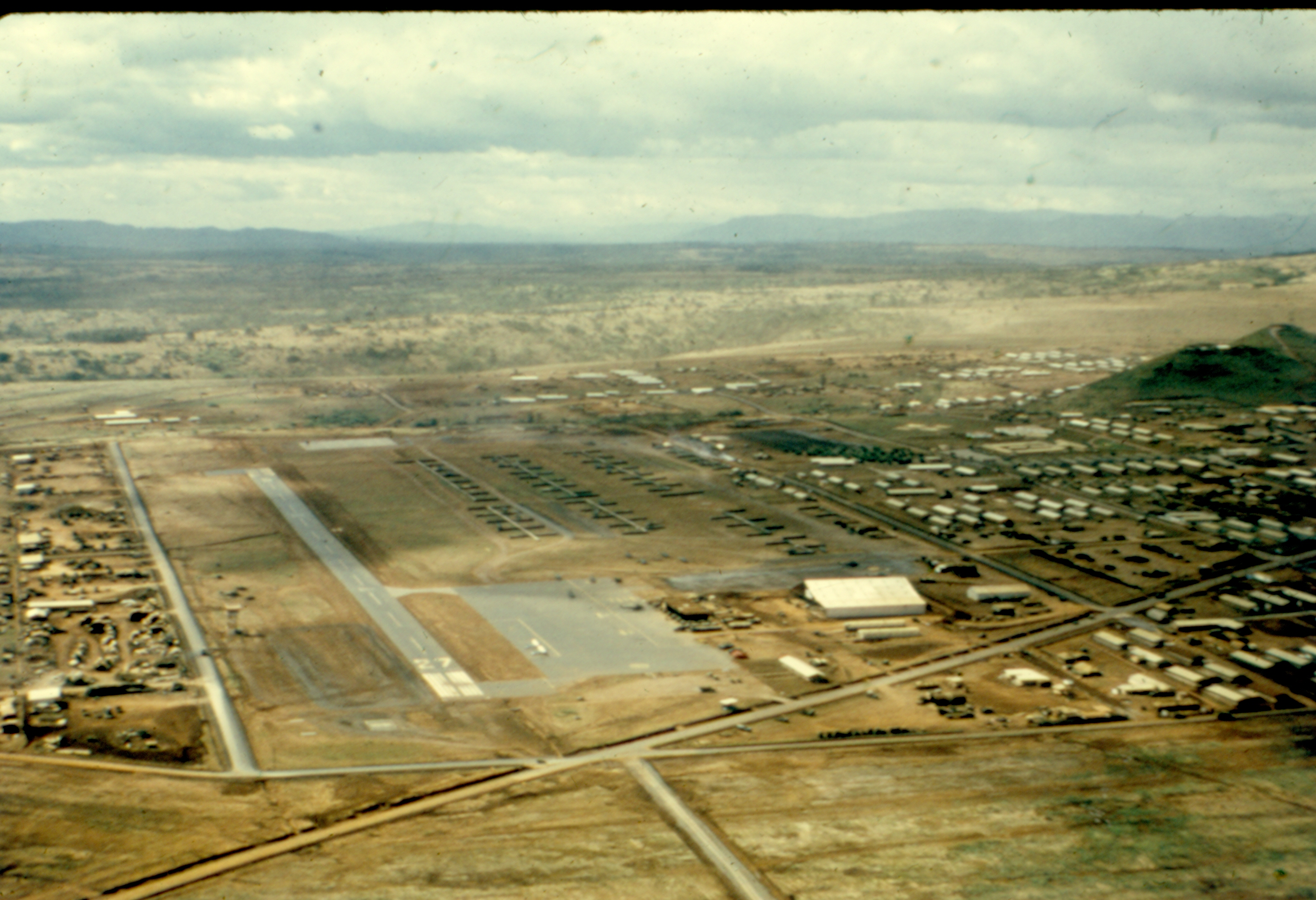
- Camp Enari, December 1967

Site information
- Type: Army base
- Operator: Army of the Republic of Vietnam (ARVN); United States Army (U.S. Army)
- Condition: Abandoned

Location
- Shown within Vietnam
- Coordinates: 13°52′02″N 108°02′10″E

Site history
- Built: 1966
- In use: 1966-1972
- Battles/wars: Vietnam War

Garrison information
- Garrison: 4th Infantry Division

Airfield information
- Elevation: 2,529 feet (771 m) AMSL
Runways
Direction	Length and surface
09/27	2,500 feet (762 m) PSP

Camp Enari (also known as Dragon Mountain Base Camp and Hensel Airfield) is a former U.S. Army base south of Pleiku in the Central Highlands of South Vietnam.

== History ==
Camp Enari was established near Dragon Mountain (Núi Hàm Rồng) and Highway 14, 12 km southeast of Pleiku. The base was named for 1st Lieutenant Mark Enari, the first 4th Infantry Division member awarded the Silver Star (posthumously) in Vietnam, who was killed in action on 2 December 1966.

Camp Enari served as the base for the 4th Infantry Division from September 1966 until February 1968 and from April 1968 until February 1970.

Other units stationed at Camp Enari included:

- 2nd Squadron, 1st Cavalry (August 1967-February 1968, June-November 1968)
- 69th Armor Regiment (August 1967-April 1970)
- 4th Aviation Battalion

Hensel Airfield was named after WO-1 Ernest Hensel a 1st Squadron, 10th Cavalry Huey helicopter gunship pilot who was killed in action on 17 February 1967.

The base was turned over to South Vietnamese control on 15 April 1970.

== Current use ==
The base is abandoned and turned over to farmland, light industry and housing.
