= Jill Davie =

American chef

- Education: University of California, Santa Cruz; Culinary Institute of America
- Occupation: Chef
- Spouse: Clark Staub
- Culinary career
- Current restaurant(s): Mar Vista
- Previous restaurant(s): Josie (2000–)
- Television show(s): Date Plate
- Award(s) won: Julia Child's Food and Wine Baby Chef Award, 1996

Jill Davie is an American chef. She is the chef-owner of the Mar Vista in Los Angeles, California.

== Early life and education ==
Jill Davie grew up in Los Angeles. She attended the University of California, Santa Cruz and the Culinary Institute of America (CIA). At the CIA, she worked at LuLu in San Francisco.

== Career ==
In 1996, she became the chef de cuisine at Hans Rockenwagner's restaurant. She worked for Rockenwagner for three years. After leaving Rockenwagner, she was a visiting chef at Charlie Trotter's, Blackbird and Tru.

In 2000, Davie started working at Josie, the eponymous restaurant of Josie Le Balch in Santa Monica. She became chef de cuisine at Josie in 2003. That same year, she appeared on the Food Network's Date Plate. Davie appeared on the channel's Party Starters the following year. In 2006, she opened the Mar Vista in Los Angeles with D. Brandon Walker. She was featured on Shopping With Chefs in 2007.

Davie appeared in Time Machine Chefs on ABC in 2012.

== Personal life ==
Davie is married to chef Clark Staub.
