= Lon Symensma =

American chef (born 1977)

Lon Symensma (born March 22, 1977) is an American chef residing in Denver, Colorado. He is the executive chef/owner of Denver's ChoLon Modern Asian Bistro. Lon Symensma is from Letts Iowa, and attended Louisa Muscatine High School graduating in 1995.

In its first year ChoLon was a semi-finalist for the James Beard Foundation Award "Best New Restaurant" in the nation. ChoLon has since risen to be ranked 3rd Best Restaurant in Denver by 5280 magazine and Chef Lon has been awarded Best Chef in Denver in 2012 and 2013 by Westword.

== Honors and awards ==
- 2009- Featured in the Fall Edition of Art Culinaire.
