= Melissa Kelly (chef) =

American chef

Melissa Kelly is an American chef in Rockland, Maine in the United States. She is the Executive Chef and proprietor of Primo, a restaurant located in Maine.

== Early life and education ==
Kelly grew up on Long Island, New York and graduated first in class from the Culinary Institute of America in Hyde Park, New York. She worked with Larry Forgione at An American Place and Alice Waters at Chez Panisse.

== Career ==
Kelly co-founded the restaurant Primo with Price Kushner in 1999 and serves as its executive chef, preparing Italian and Mediterranean cuisine with a focus on local ingredients. Primo locations can also be found at hotels in Orlando, Florida and Tucson, Arizona.

She re-opened her Orlando location in the fall of 2021 after an extensive renovation tracing back to her family roots in Puglia, Italy.

== Awards ==
She received the 1999 and 2013 Best Chef in the Northeast honors at the James Beard Awards.
