= Robert Danhi =

Robert Danhi (born July 19, 1970) is an American research chef and food writer specializing in Southeast Asian Cuisine. Danhi is also the author of the James Beard finalist cookbook Southeast Asian Flavors.

== Early years and education ==
Robert Danhi was born and raised in New York, United States. He started his culinary career as a dishwasher at the age of 15. After working his way up to sous chef positions in various Los Angeles restaurants, Danhi obtained his AOS degree at the Culinary Institute of America in Hyde Park, New York in 1991. Afterwards he returned to the food service Industry in Los Angeles and Hawaii. After attaining the position of Executive Chef, Danhi returned to academia and became the Executive Chef Instructor and Director of Education at the Southern California School of Culinary Arts. In 1998, Robert joined the Culinary Institute of America in Hyde Park as a faculty member.

== Career ==
In 2005, Danhi founded Chef Danhi & Co Inc., a consulting firm based in Los Angeles, focusing on menu and product research and development, sales and marketing support, and educational and training programs. Danhi is also a frequent presenter for Research Chefs Association, Institute of Food Technologist, Specialty Food Association, Produce Marketing Association, Worlds of Flavors, The Flavor Experience, International Association of Culinary Professionals, National Restaurant Association, National Association of Colleges and Universities, and the Restaurant Leadership Conference.

In 2008, Robert published Southeast Asian Flavors—Adventures in Cooking the Foods of Thailand, Vietnam, Malaysia, & Singapore; and Easy Thai Cooking – 75 Family-Style Dishes You Can Prepare at Home in Minutes in 2012. Robert has hosted Taste of Vietnam. a 26-episode TV show exploring the undiscovered provinces of Vietnam, broadcast nationally in Vietnam on HTV7 in 2014. Robert is also one of the main judges of Top Chef Vietnam (Đầu Bếp Đỉnh)- Season 1.

== Personal life ==
Danhi is currently living in El Segundo, Los Angeles with his Malaysian wife, Esther Danhi.

== Television appearances ==
Robert Danhi- Taste of VietNam- Host

Top Chef Vietnam – Season 1 – Main Judge

== Cookbooks ==
- Southeast Asian Flavors
- Easy Thai Cooking
