= Ben Pollinger =

American chef

- Born: New Jersey
- Education: Culinary Institute of America in Hyde Park, New York
- Culinary career
- Rating: Michelin stars
- Current restaurant
- Previous restaurants: The Hill; Oceana
- Website: thehillcloster.com

Ben Pollinger is owner of The Hill restaurant, and formerly of the Oceana restaurant in New York City. Oceana was awarded a Michelin Star in 2013 while Pollinger was executive chef. which he lost in 2015

== Career ==
Pollinger was raised in New Jersey. He earned a degree in economics from Boston University and later graduated as class valedictorian from Culinary Institute of America. He trained under chef Alain Ducasse at Le Louis XV in Monte Carlo.

After leaving Oceana in 2016, he opened The Hill restaurant in 2018. which went out of business in 2026..

== See also ==
- List of Michelin starred restaurants
