= Kelly Liken =

American chef and restaurant owner (born 1976)

- Born: August 29, 1976 (age 49); Pittsburgh, Pennsylvania, United States
- Education: Culinary Institute of America
- Culinary career
- Cooking style: American cuisine
- Website: http://www.kellyliken.com/

Kelly Liken is an American chef and restaurant owner. She has worked in Virginia and Colorado and has opened two restaurants in Colorado. She has appeared as a contestant on the television shows Top Chef and Iron Chef America.

== Personal life ==
Liken was born in Pittsburgh, Pennsylvania, and she currently lives in Vail, Colorado. She attended the Culinary Institute of America where she graduated first in her class. She married Rick Colomitz in 2004.

== Professional career ==
Liken was an intern at the Inn at Little Washington in Washington, Virginia. She moved to Colorado in 2002 and began to work in the kitchen at Splendido at the Chateau in Beaver Creek, Colorado, where she met her future husband, Rick Colomitz. In 2004, she opened Restaurant Kelly Liken in Vail and later that year, she married Colomitz. Her husband was general manager and wine director at the restaurant, which closed in 2015. In June 2016 she opened her new restaurant project, Harvest Vail located in Edwards, Colorado.

She visited the White House in Washington DC on 19 April 2011 two months after First Lady Michelle Obama visited her restaurant for dinner with her daughters. She has appeared on television on the Bravo Network's Top Chef D.C, on the Food Network's Iron Chef America, and on the CBS Morning Show.

== Charity work ==
Liken is one of the founders of the Sowing Seeds Program (Part of the Vail Valley Youth Foundation). Sowing Seeds focuses on the scientific aspect of teaching children about how foods grow, as well as the accompanying nutritional message of eating healthy. This program involves a greenhouse project at Brush Creek Elementary School where students plant and care for their own gardens.

Liken and her namesake restaurant are supporters of the Vail Jazz Foundation; hosting events throughout the year in conjunction with the foundation.

== Awards ==
- Wine Spectator Award of Excellence. 2005–2012
- AAA 4-Diamond Award, Restaurant Kelly Liken. 2006–2012
- James Beard Award Semi-Finalist; Best Chef Southwest. 2009, 2010, 2011
- Winner Wine Spectator Taste of Vail Bar Chef Mix-Off. 2007, 2008
- Taste of Vail Lamb Cook-Off Winner. 2010, 2011
