= Larry Forgione =

American chef and author

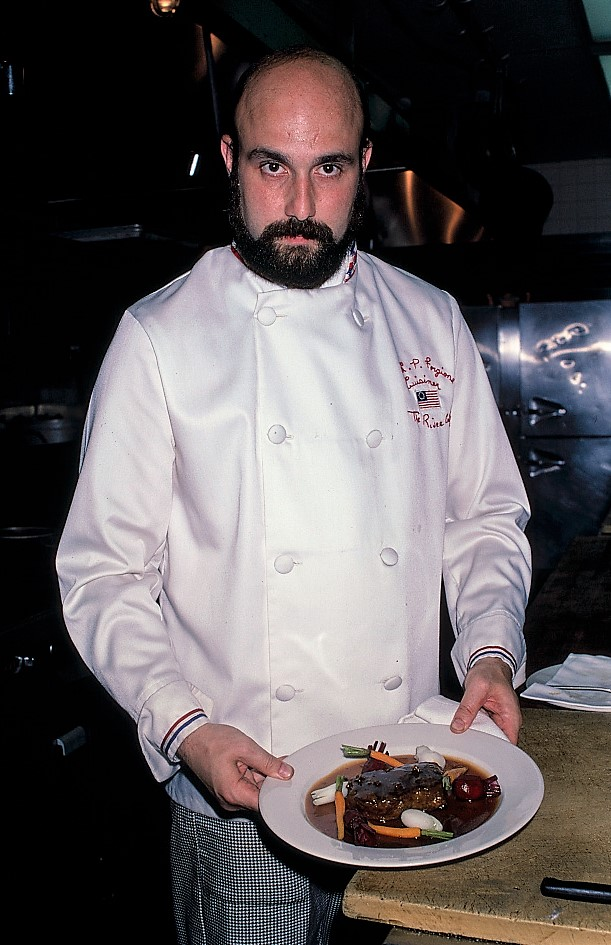
Forgione as chef at the River Cafe, NYC, circa 1980

Larry Forgione (born 1952) is a chef in the United States. He is known for his work at the An American Place restaurant in New York City and several notable chefs apprenticed with him (including Christina Machamer, David Shalleck, Melissa Kelly, Michael Cimarusti, and Alexandra Guarnaschelli). His son, Marc Forgione, has his own restaurant and competes on Iron Chef America.

Forgione was born on Long Island, New York, in 1952. He attended the Culinary Institute of America. He received an America's Best Chef recognition from the James Beard Foundation and Chef of the Year honors from the Culinary Institute of America.

Forgione cofounded American Spoon Foods, a specialty food maker in northern Michigan. His An American Place Cookbook won the James Beard Award for Best American Cookbook.

Forgione's remake of Lord & Taylor Cafés into Signature Cafés (since rebranded as Lord & Taylor Signature) was part of the department store's 2003 restructuring.

== Personal life ==
On April 18, 2019, Forgione was found guilty of involuntary vehicular manslaughter in the city of Santa Barbara, CA. Forgione ran a red light and struck and killed 90-year-old Gilbert Ramirez (a World War Two vet) while Ramirez was legally crossing the street. On July 16, 2019, Forgione was sentenced to two months in jail.
