= Matthew Levin (chef) =

American chef

- Born: August 25, 1975; Philadelphia Pennsylvania
- Education: Syracuse University; Culinary Institute of America
- Culinary career
- Cooking style: Progressive American
- Current restaurant(s): Chef Owner of Adsum Restaurant Philadelphia (2010-present)
- Previous restaurant(s): Lacroix, Philadelphia (2006–2008); Pluckemin Inn, Bedminster, New Jersey (2005–2006); Moonlight Restaurant, New Hope, Pennsylvania; Charlie Trotters, Chicago; Aureole, New York City

Matthew Levin is an American celebrity chef based in Philadelphia. He was the executive chef at Lacroix in the famed Rittenhouse Hotel until December 9, 2008. From 2010 to July 24, 2011, he was the chef at Adsum, a Queen Village bistro where he gained notoriety for dishes including Tastykake sliders and his Four Loco dinner. In March 2012, along with Cuba Libre owners Barry Gutin and Larry Cohen, he will take over as chef and co-owner of Square Peg, at the former location of Marathon Grill at 10th and Walnut St.

== Early life ==
Levin attended Syracuse University on a lacrosse scholarship, studying business. He then went on to study at the Culinary Institute of America in Hyde Park, New York.

== Career ==
As a graduate of the Culinary Institute of America, Levin began his culinary career training under chefs including Georges Perrier at Le Bec-Fin and Brasserie Perrier and Craig Shelton at The Ryland Inn. Levin eventually went on to distinguished restaurants such as Aureole in New York City, Charlie Trotters in Chicago, The Millhouse in Langhorne and The Pluckemin Inn in Bedminster, New Jersey.

Levin drew national attention as executive chef at the Moonlight Restaurant in New Hope, Pennsylvania. The Philadelphia Inquirer food critic Craig LaBan awarded Moonlight three bells.

Levin returned to his hometown of Philadelphia in 2006 to join the kitchen at Lacroix. Soon after his arrival, critic Craig LaBan once again reviewed Levin's work and awarded the cuisine a rare four bells stating, "Chef Levin has elevated this luxury destination to an elite four-bell status", hailing Levin's creations as "Philly’s most sophisticated contemporary cooking".

Lifestyle Magazine named Levin among the region's best chefs and Philadelphia Style magazine named Levin one of Philadelphia's "Hot Chefs in 2007". In 2008, Philadelphia Magazine rated Lacroix #2 out of the top 50 restaurants in Philadelphia.

At the end of 2008 Levin left Lacroix to open his own restaurant. In 2008 it was reported that the restaurant, Masano, was slated to open late 2009 or early 2010. The deal for Masano, and another restaurant, later fell through. In 2010 Levin plans on opening Adsum bistro. In January 2013 critic Craig Laban would go to write a scathing review of Levin's Square Peg.
