= 29 Diner =

Historic commercial building in Virginia, United States

- U.S. National Register of Historic Places
- Virginia Landmarks Register
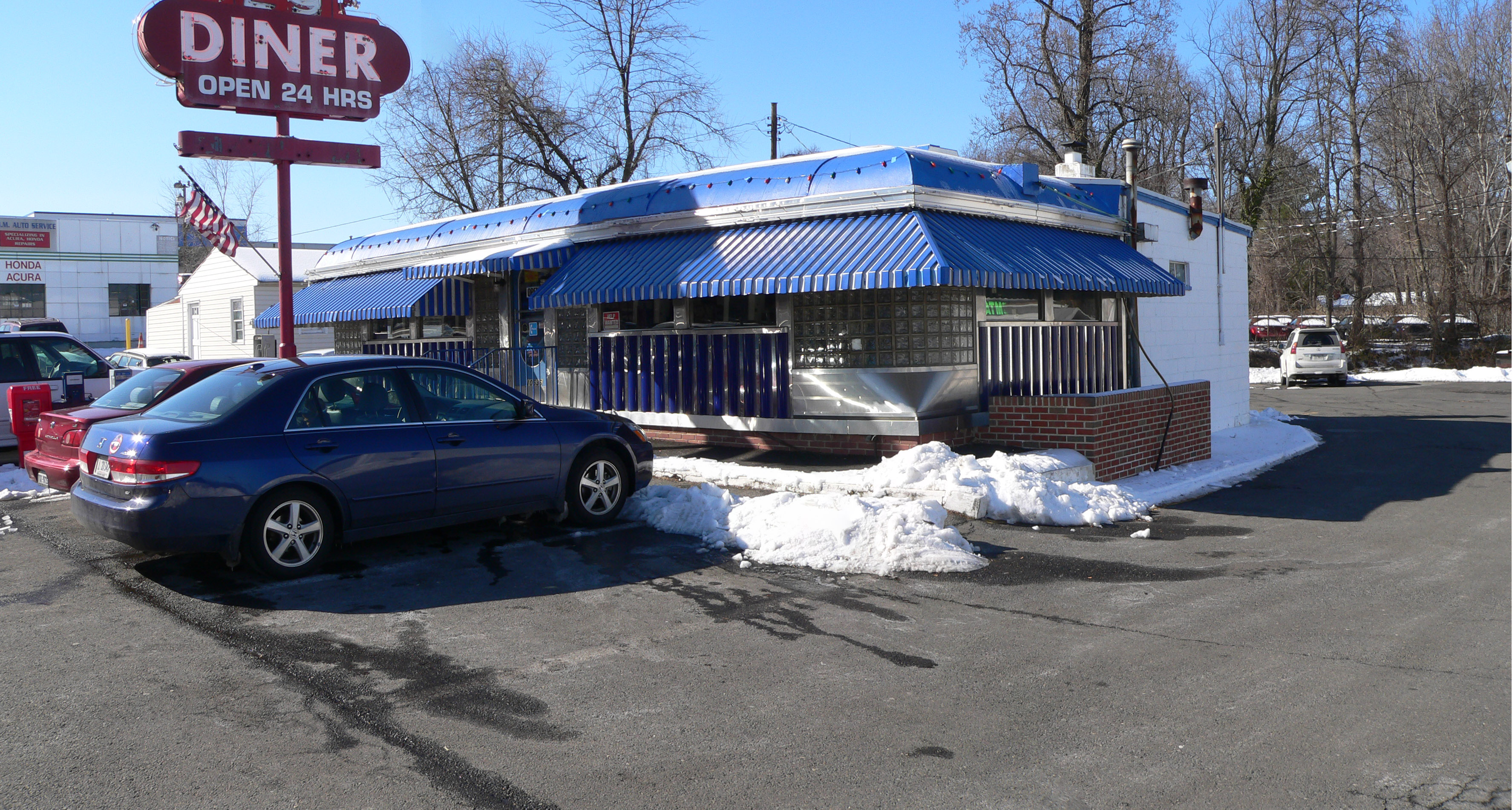
- Exterior of the 29 Diner

- Location within Fairfax Location within Northern Virginia Location within Virginia Location within the United States
- Location: 10536 Lee Hwy., Fairfax, Virginia
- Coordinates: 38°51′29.1″N 77°18′31.9″W
- Area: 1 acre (0.40 ha)
- Built: 1947
- Architect: Mountain View Diner Co.
- Architectural style: Moderne
- MPS: Diners of Virginia MPS
- NRHP reference No.: 92001370
- VLR No.: 151-0039

Significant dates
- Added to NRHP: October 29, 1992
- Designated VLR: June 17, 1992

The 29 Diner is a diner in the City of Fairfax, Virginia. The diner was located at 10536 Fairfax Boulevard (U.S. Route 29/U.S. Route 50), a short distance west of the Boulevard's intersection with Chain Bridge Road (Virginia State Route 123).

== History ==
The 29 Diner opened on July 20, 1947. It was built by the Mountain View Diners Company of Singac, New Jersey. D.T. "Bill" Glascock (deceased) purchased the diner and had it shipped to a strip of land that he owned in Fairfax, Virginia. Glascock and his wife, Elvira "Curly," ran the diner for the first several years, and thereafter leased the building to a succession of business owners.

In 1973, the Tastee Diner company bought the location and it became the Tastee 29 Diner.

In 1992, the diner was declared to be a historic site. Marc Christian Wagner, an architectural historian from the Charlottesville-based Preservation Associates of Virginia organization wrote the statement of significance. The opening of the statement declares:

The Tastee 29 Diner is a rare survivor among the once-numerous streamlined Moderns diners that operated in the United States. While it is rare to find one of these 1940's diners still standing, it is even more unusual to find one still in operation. The high quality of this Mountain View diner has withstood the test of time in a hostile environment.

Thus, in 1992, the Tastee 29 Diner was added to the list of National Register of Historic Places.

In the late-1990s, Fredy and Ginger Guevara (Ginger being a former waitress at the 29 Diner in the mid-1960s) bought the location and restored its original name of 29 Diner.

For years the diner was-open twenty four hours a day, seven days a week, with the exception being Christmas Day. In January 2009, the diner began closing on Monday nights due to the 2008 financial crisis; however, in 2014 it was restored to being open 24 hours a day.

In May, 2014, the 29 Diner went out of business under the operations of Fredy and Ginger Guevara, but the property lease was quickly picked up by Fairfax native John Wood, who planned to reopen it in the summer of 2014. After some delays, the diner reopened to the public at 12:01 am on September 11, 2014. It was open 24 hours Tuesday through Sunday and closed on Monday.

Two days before Thanksgiving 2021, a chemical fire near the kitchen resulted in closure of the diner until further notice. A GoFundMe campaign by community members was approaching half of its collection goal within a week of the fire.

== Culture ==
Fairfax, Virginia, mayor Robert Lederer has made a recent annual tradition of dining at the 29 Diner on Thanksgiving.

John Walsh, host of America's Most Wanted, made a visit to the diner in 1999 with two bodyguards.

Bill Griffith featured 29 Diner in the July 23, 2003, and April 21, 2012, installments of Zippy the Pinhead.
