= Jackson Hole Burgers =

Chain of hamburger restaurants

- Original restaurant at 232 East 64th Street (2026)
- Interactive map of Jackson Hole Burgers

Restaurant information
- Established: 1972
- Location: 232 East 64th Street, New York, New York, United States
- Coordinates: 40°45′50.2″N 73°57′46.2″W
- Other locations: Astoria, Queens; Englewood, New Jersey; Murray Hill, Manhattan
- Website: jacksonholeburgers.com

Jackson Hole Burgers, simply called Jackson Hole, is a New York City based chain of hamburger restaurants. It has been family-owned since its 1972 establishment. Before she became famous, Jennifer Aniston was a waitress at the Upper West Side location. The location closed in 2016 after 42 years. There are currently restaurants operating in Astoria, Queens; Englewood, New Jersey; and two locations in Manhattan.

== History ==
The chain was started by brothers Jimmy and Chris Meskouris at 232 East 64th Street on the Upper East Side of Manhattan. The name "Jackson Hole" was selected for the restaurant because they found a National Geographic article on Jackson Hole, Wyoming, under the floor when they were renovating and they also happened to live in Jackson Heights, Queens.

It is said that Donald Trump is a fan. Other fans are said to include Denzel Washington, Derek Jeter, Hillary and Bill Clinton and Diane Sawyer.

== In media ==
In the 1990 crime film Goodfellas, the scene at the Airline Diner where Henry Hill and Tommy DeVito steal a truck was filmed at the Jackson Hole location on Astoria Boulevard in Queens, which is a 1950s era prefabricated stainless steel diner manufactured by Mountain View Diners Company.

== See also ==
- List of restaurants in New York City
