= The Culinary Institute of America at Hyde Park =

Culinary college in Hyde Park, New York

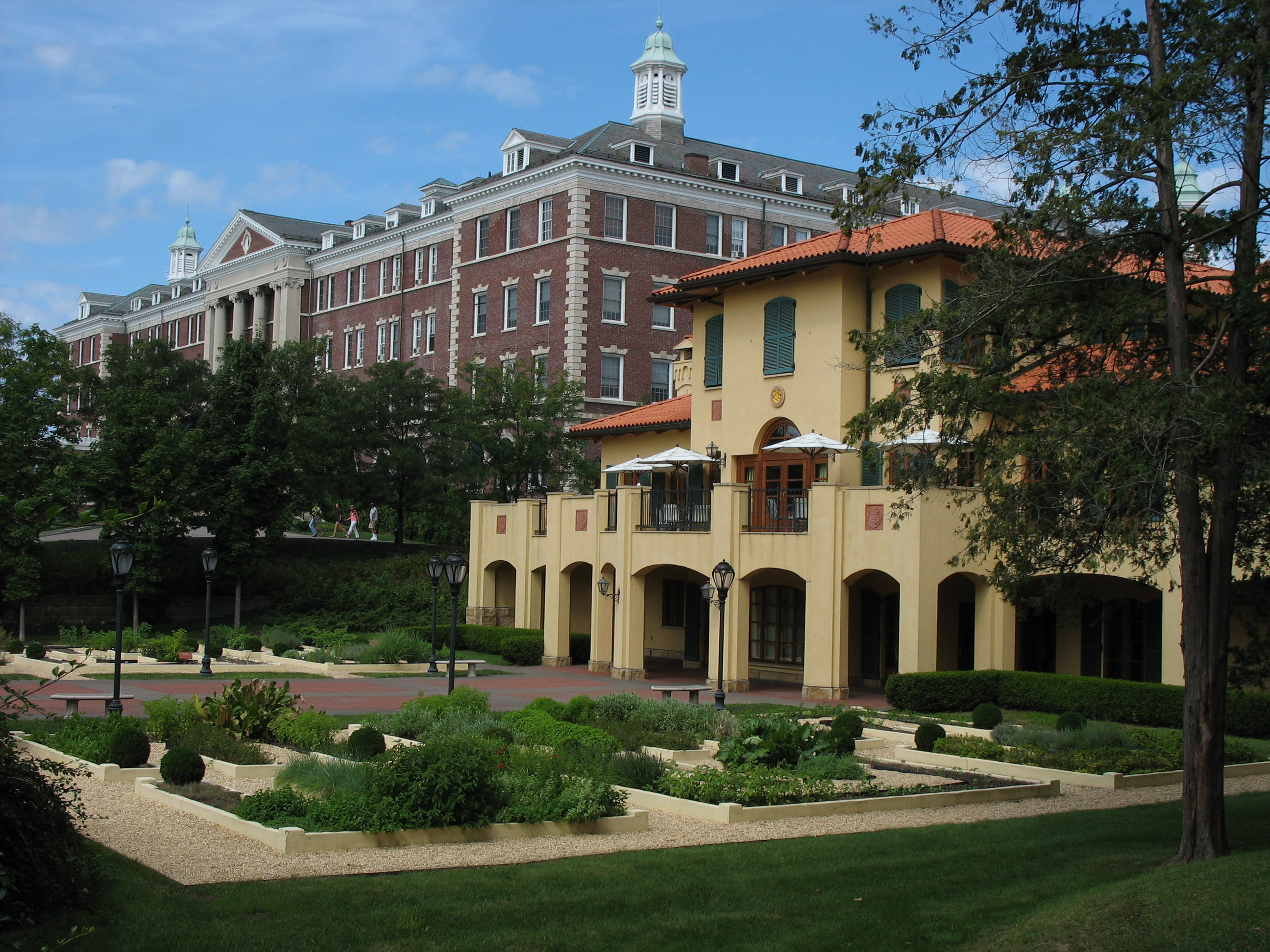
- Interactive map of the The Culinary Institute of America at Hyde Park area
- Former names: St. Andrew-on-Hudson

General information
- Location: 1946 Campus Drive, Hyde Park, New York 12538
- Coordinates: 41.745941°N 73.932959°W

Technical details
- Grounds: 70 acres (0.1 sq mi)

Design and construction
- Architecture firm: Schickel & Ditmars, Noelker and Hull

The Culinary Institute of America at Hyde Park is located in the town of Hyde Park, New York, between the Hudson River and U.S. Route 9. The Culinary Institute of America (CIA) campus offers associate and bachelor's degrees and certificate programs in culinary arts and baking and pastry arts. It is the school's primary and largest campus, with about 2,300 students.

The property was first settled around the 1600s, and mills and farms made use of the area's land and streams until the provincial of the Maryland-New York Province of the Society of Jesus purchased the land around 1897. The Jesuits subsequently constructed the present-day Roth Hall and other buildings, operating the property as the novitiate named St. Andrew-on-Hudson from 1903 to 1970. In 1970, the Culinary Institute of America purchased the property and moved its school there from New Haven, Connecticut. The school operates the property as its primary campus.

== History ==
=== Prehistory and early inhabitance ===
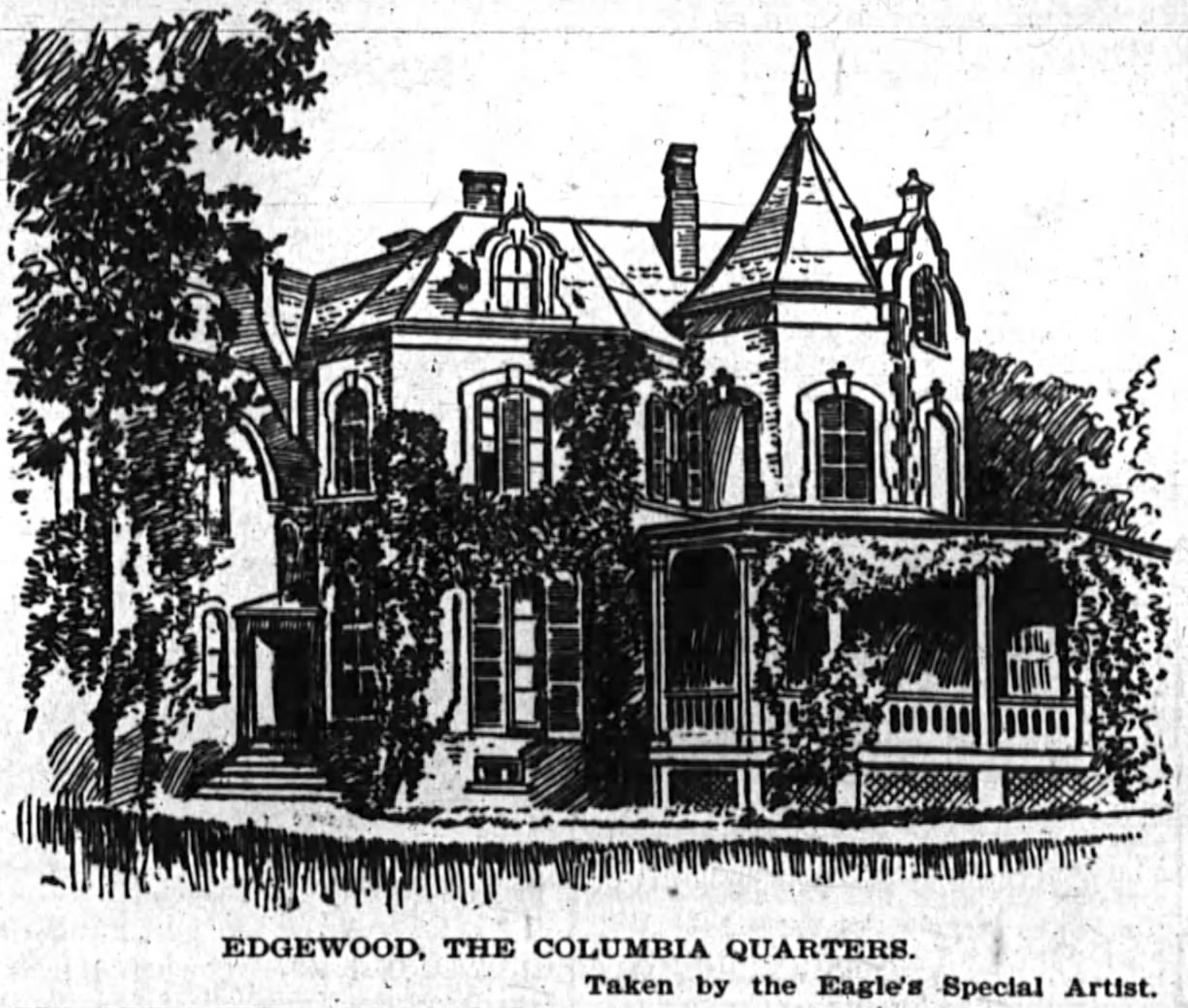
Edgewood, the Stuyvesant estate built on the property

The property's earliest inhabitance likely started near the Maritje Kill, a small stream or kill (Note: An 1893 county atlas shows large ponds or lakes behind the dam, indicating that the stream level had once been considerably higher.) in the forest toward the north end of the CIA's cleared property. The river had kept that name since the area's early history, around the United States' Colonial Era, when several mills were built on the kill. The earliest settlements in the area date to the 1600s, however the earliest recorded land transfer was in 1719. A saw mill was located on the property since at least 1786 and according to a 1789 map, a grist mill was located on the northern bank of the kill a short distance west of US Route 9.

The river was an abundant source for fish, edible plants, and water, and the Albany Post Road (present-day US Route 9) is one of the Hudson Valley's oldest north–south routes. In 1697 the land along the kill was part of Water Lot 3 of Dutchess County's Nine Partner Patent. The earliest use of the site by colonists is estimated to have been around the 1750s. The saw mill, according to the study, was present in 1774. The grist mill was owned by Jeremiah Rogers, a militia officer serving on Long Island during the Revolution. The family burial ground, across the kill, has the graves of Rogers, his son and daughter, and his grandson. The property changed ownership multiple times in the 1800s. James Roosevelt owned the land as part of his estate in the 1820s, and by the 1860s a farmhouse and stone terraces were constructed along the stream by Moses Beach. In the 1890s the Webendorfer family of Long Island refurbished the farmhouse and built barns, a tenant house, and other structures. From 1919 until its destruction around 1940, St. Andrew-on-Hudson used the Webendorfer house as a rest home.

A one-year archaeological survey was performed at the school in 2003. The survey found evidence of human activity in the campus' wooded property dating at least 3,600 years, with elements dating from around 1700 BCE and up until the mid-20th century. The survey was a requirement of New York's State Historic Preservation Office in order for the school to construct a new residential complex in a 36-acre (15 ha) expansion to its campus; it was funded by the CIA and conducted by Landmark Archaeology, a company based in Altamont, New York. The surveyors focused on a 5-acre (2.0 ha) site between the Hudson River and Route 9. The site contained two house structures, a dam, a mill, retaining walls, and outbuildings and barns, and was found to be eligible as a historic district on the National Register of Historic Places. Excavations unearthed foundation walls, a well, cistern, and post molds, and about 40,000 artifacts. Prehistoric objects, dating to the Late Archaic period, included stone tools, byproducts of tool production, projectile points, and fire hearths found in the site's portion used for crop cultivation. A larger area held artifacts from the mid-to-late 1700s, including ceramics, tobacco pipes, coins, buttons, buckles, military objects, thimbles, domesticated animal remains, and an inscribed piece of slate. Due to the findings, the CIA revised its plans to prevent construction on a large portion of the site.

=== St. Andrew-on-Hudson ===
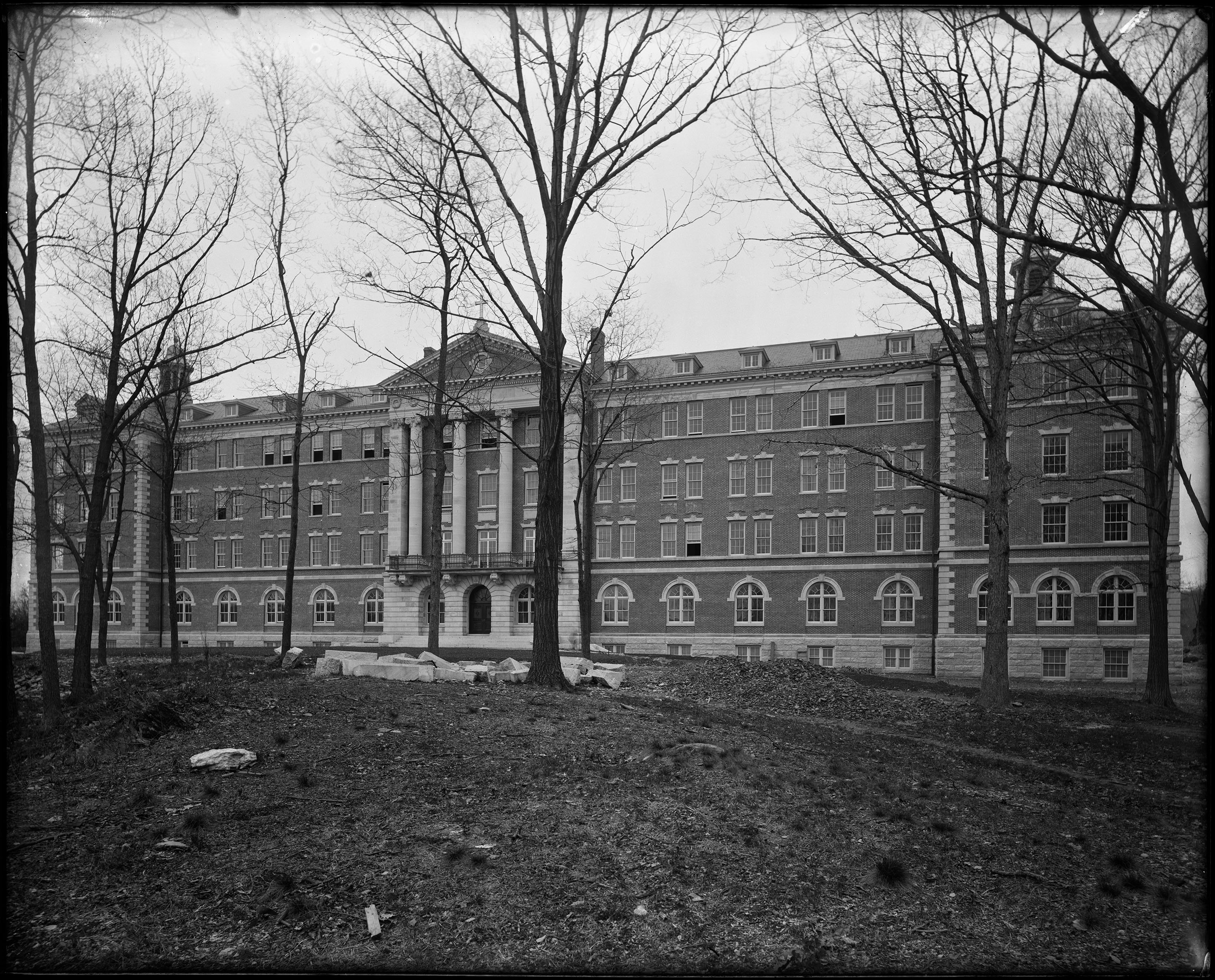
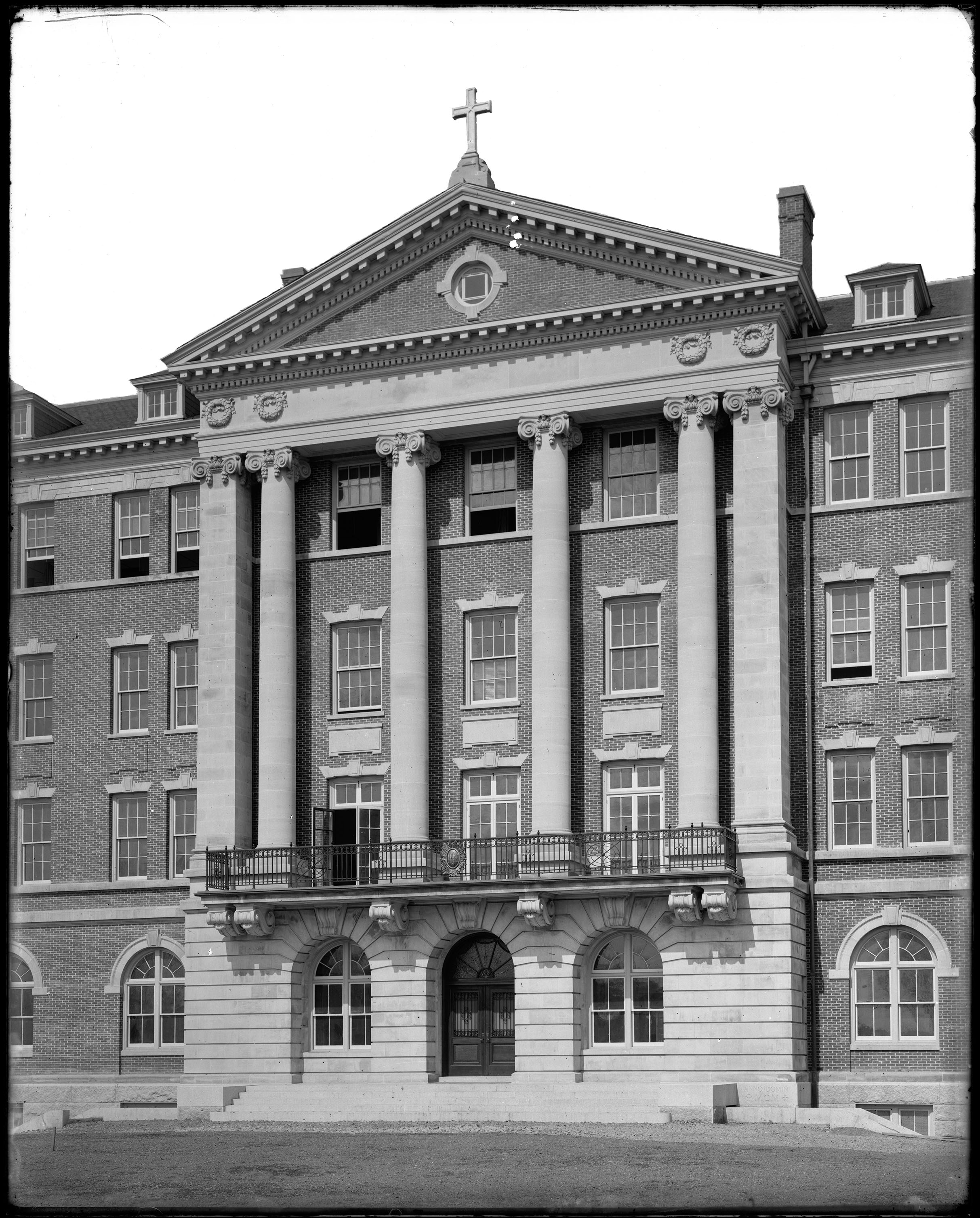
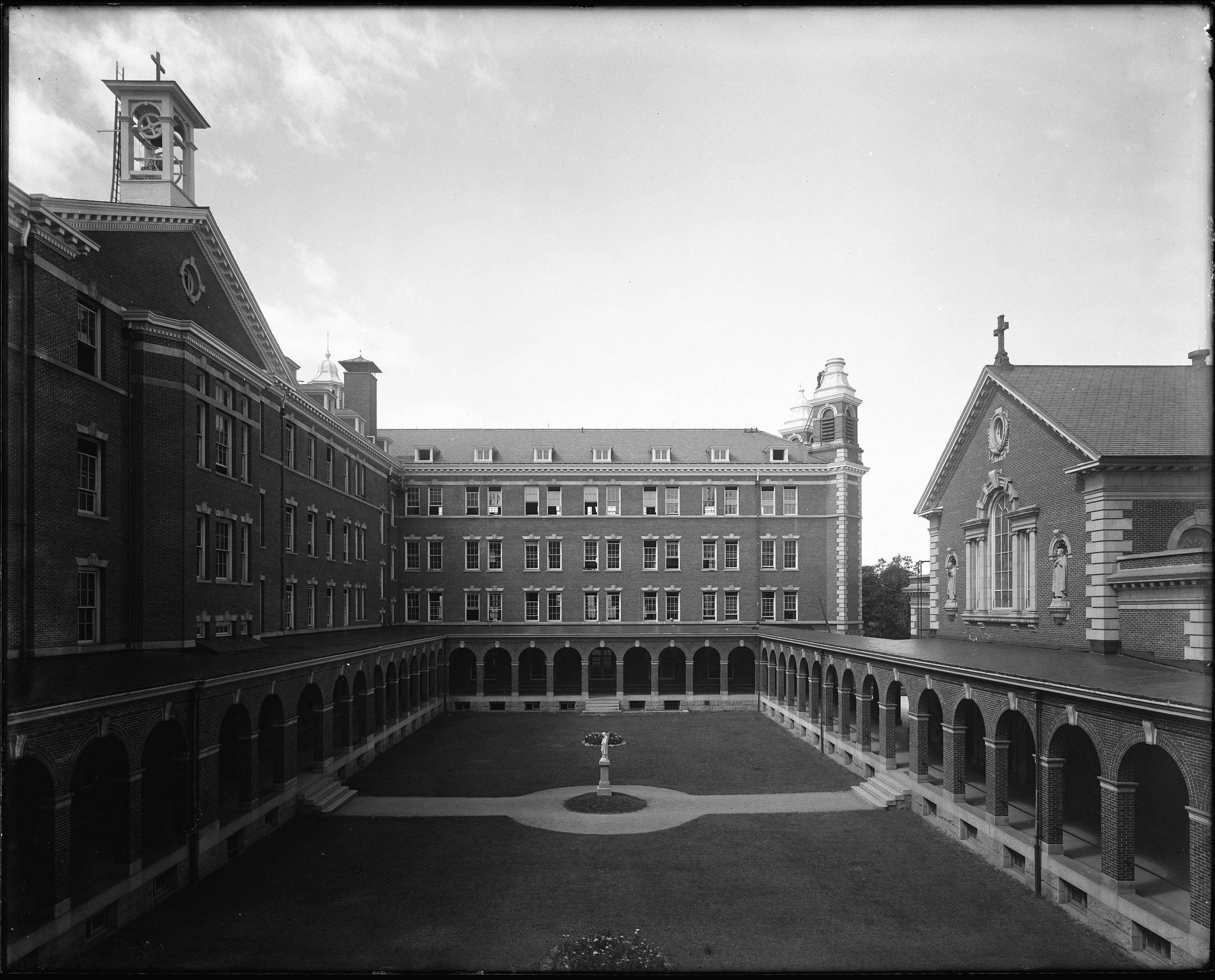
Facade, main entrance, and cloister, circa 1920
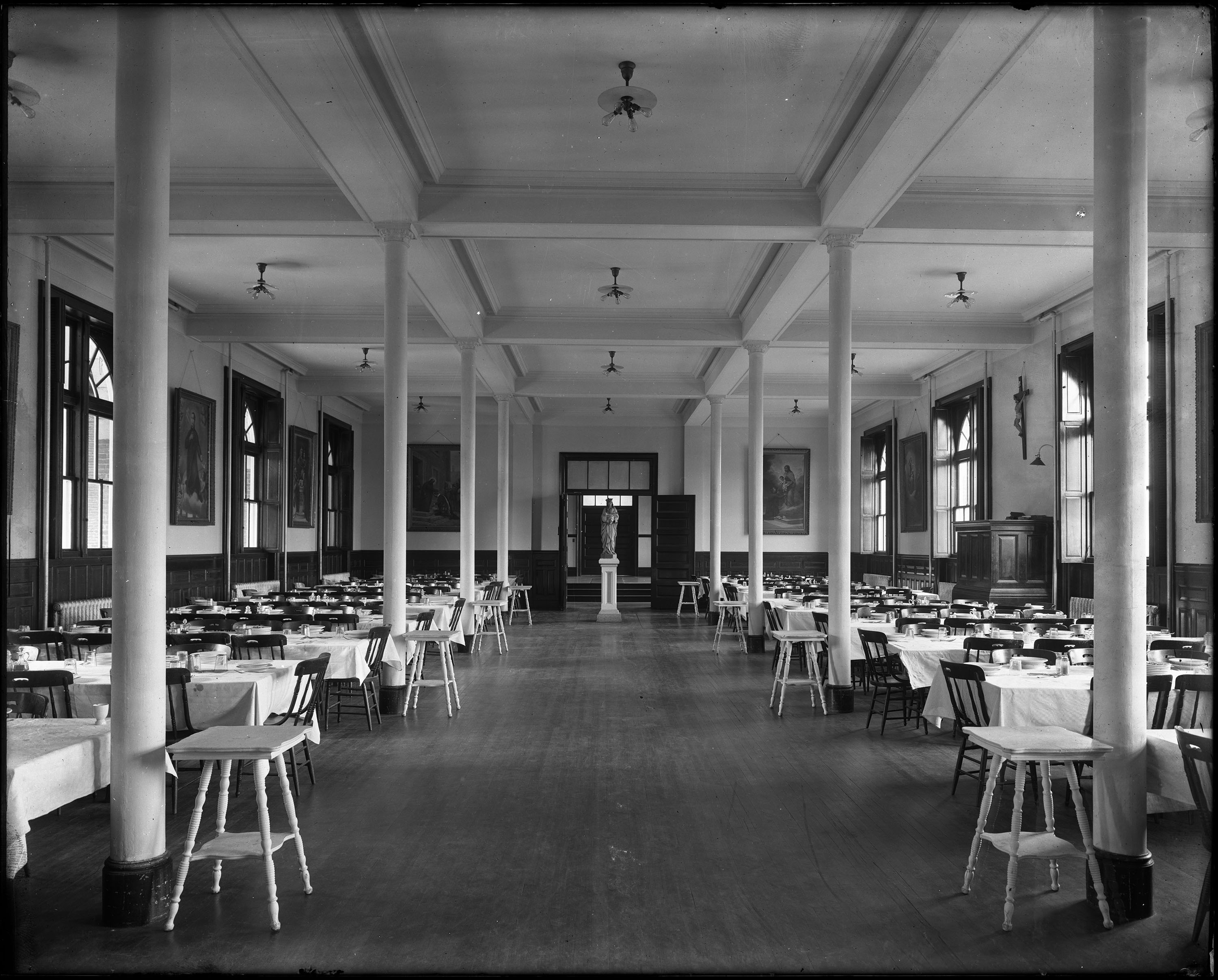
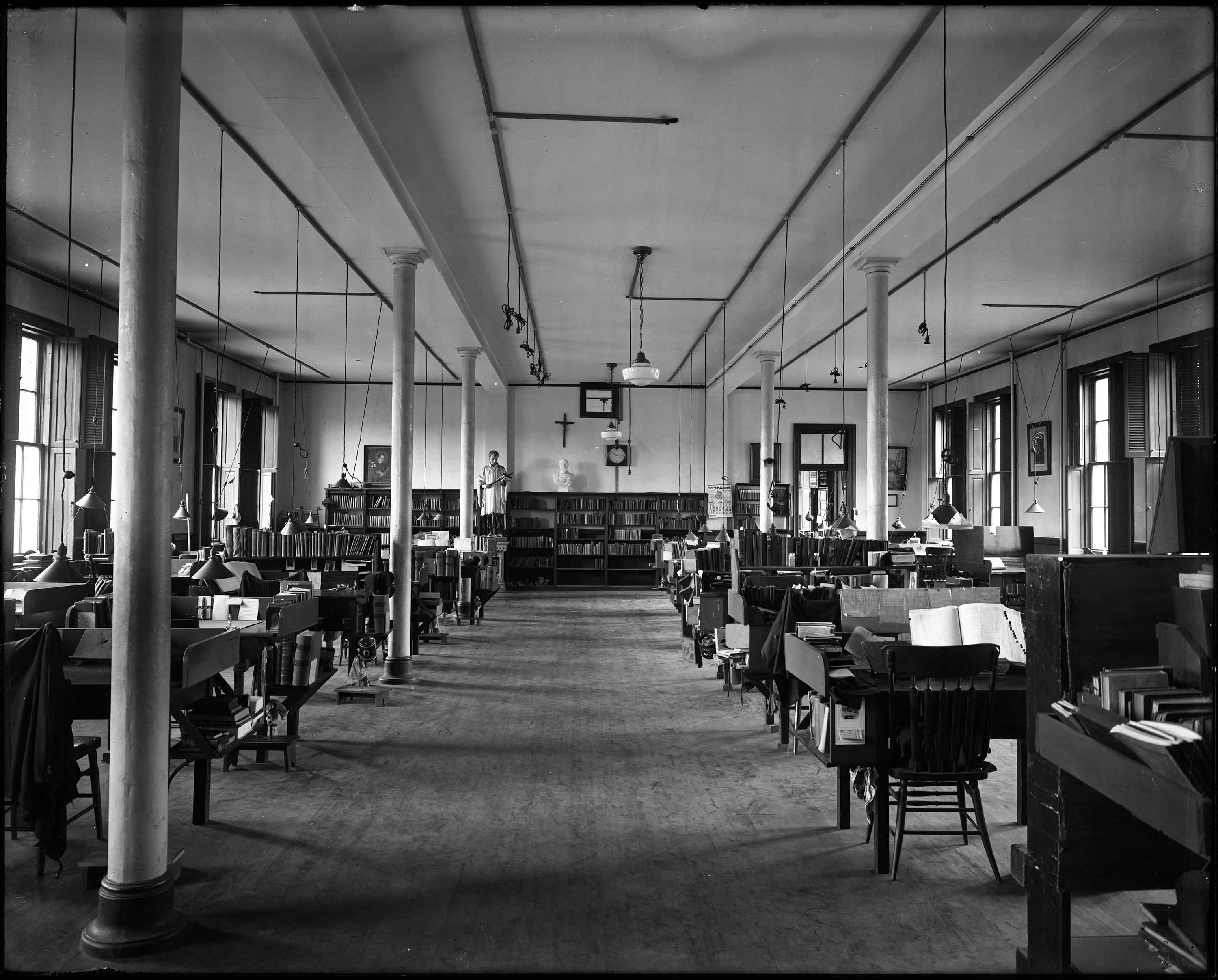
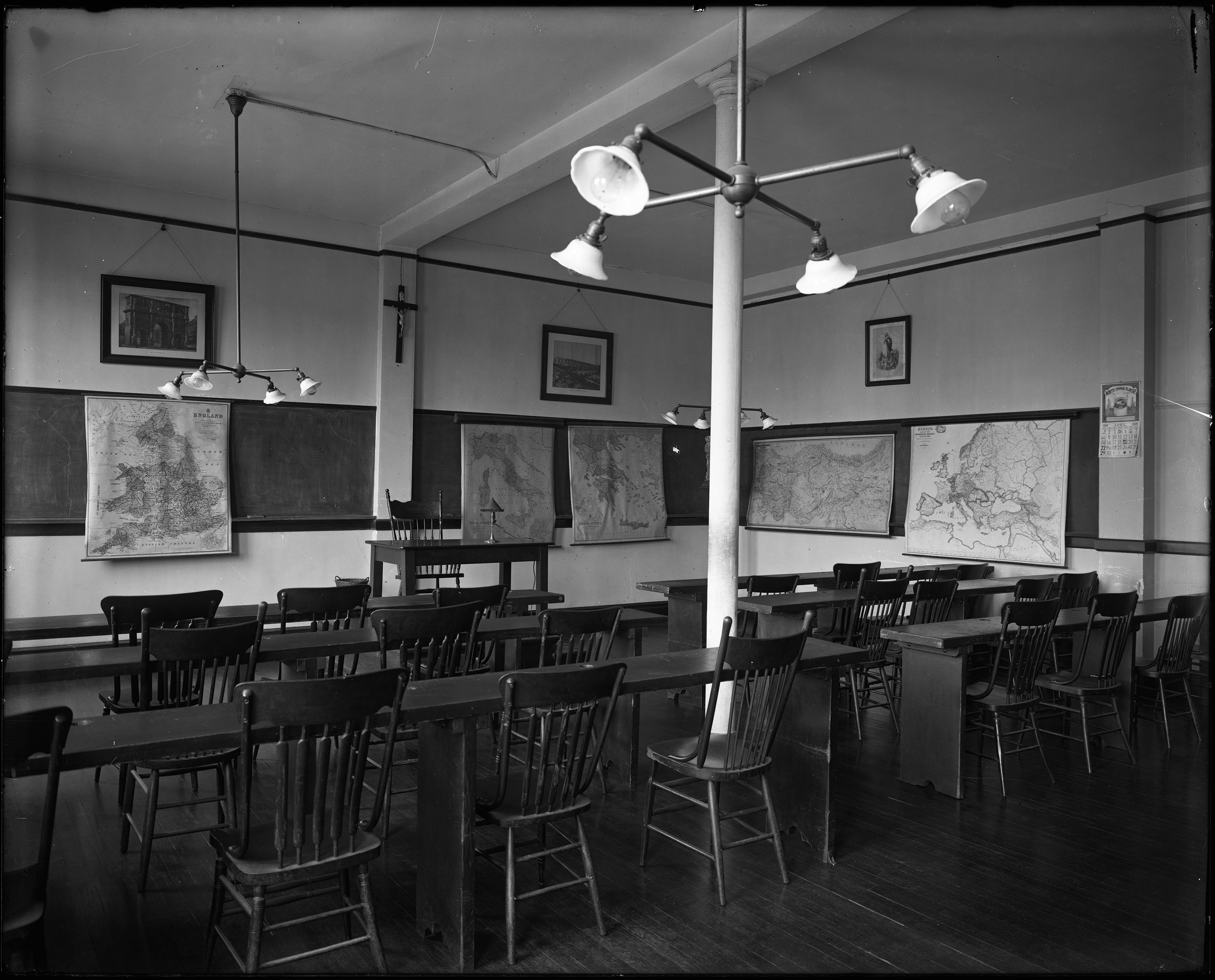
The dining hall, Juniors' study hall, and classroom, circa 1920

Edward Ignatius Purbrick, an English Jesuit and the provincial of the region's Jesuit province, acquired the property around 1897 to 1899 for $22,500. He purchased several farms, from the Butler, Jones, and Osborn families, and the estates of John R. Stuyvesant (Ridgewood) and Webendorfer families (Edgewood). Stuyvesant deeded his property first, on July 13, 1899. John Aspinwall Roosevelt (FDR's uncle) was one of the owners of that property. The acquisition period took nineteen years and seven months, with a total cost to novitiate at $37,901.

On January 15, 1903 the novitiate and juniorate of the Maryland-New York Province of the Society of Jesus left its house in Frederick, Maryland (which it had occupied since 1833) and moved to St. Andrew with 123 Jesuits.

The Maryland house was built next to the street and only had a 1.5-acre (0.61 ha) property. Purbrick described the new property in Hyde Park as easy to access, in a good neighborhood, surrounded by well-maintained estates with English-style parkland. The Jesuits planned to demolish the property's mansion, Ridgewood House, and build a structure to house 200 Jesuits, including novices, juniors, and tertians.

The site for Roth Hall was chosen on the highest ground of the property, and was originally completely hidden from the road, only seen from the Hudson. The surrounding land is undulating, and the Jesuits found it lends itself to building grottoes and winding paths for shrines and summer houses. They hoped to construct a broad walkway the whole length of the 60-foot (18 m) cliff which skirts the river and hides the railroad and grounds from each other. They also planned to construct a bridge over the railroad, leading to a piece of rocky land jutting into the river to be used for bathing and boating houses.

In 1906, the novitiate constructed a chapel attached to the main building. It was sponsored by Mrs. Thomas F. Ryan and dedicated to New York's Archbishop John Farley. St. Andrew also had another chapel, dedicated to Our Lady of the Way, near the entranceway to the property. James D. Murphy built the primary building as well as this chapel, the latter of which he built at his own expense. Publisher P. J. Kenedy later became the chapel's beneficiary, and built a mortuary called Della Strada there, for him and his family to be buried in. The chapel's construction began on October 2, 1905, the cornerstone was laid July 8, 1906, and the building was dedicated November 19, 1907. In 1918–19, the Via Regis, a covered walkway to the chapel, was created. Prior to that, the Jesuits would have to cross the open courtyard or walk around the open cloisters. The courtyard was landscaped in 1904 and held a statue of the Sacred Heart in its center until construction of the Via Regis.

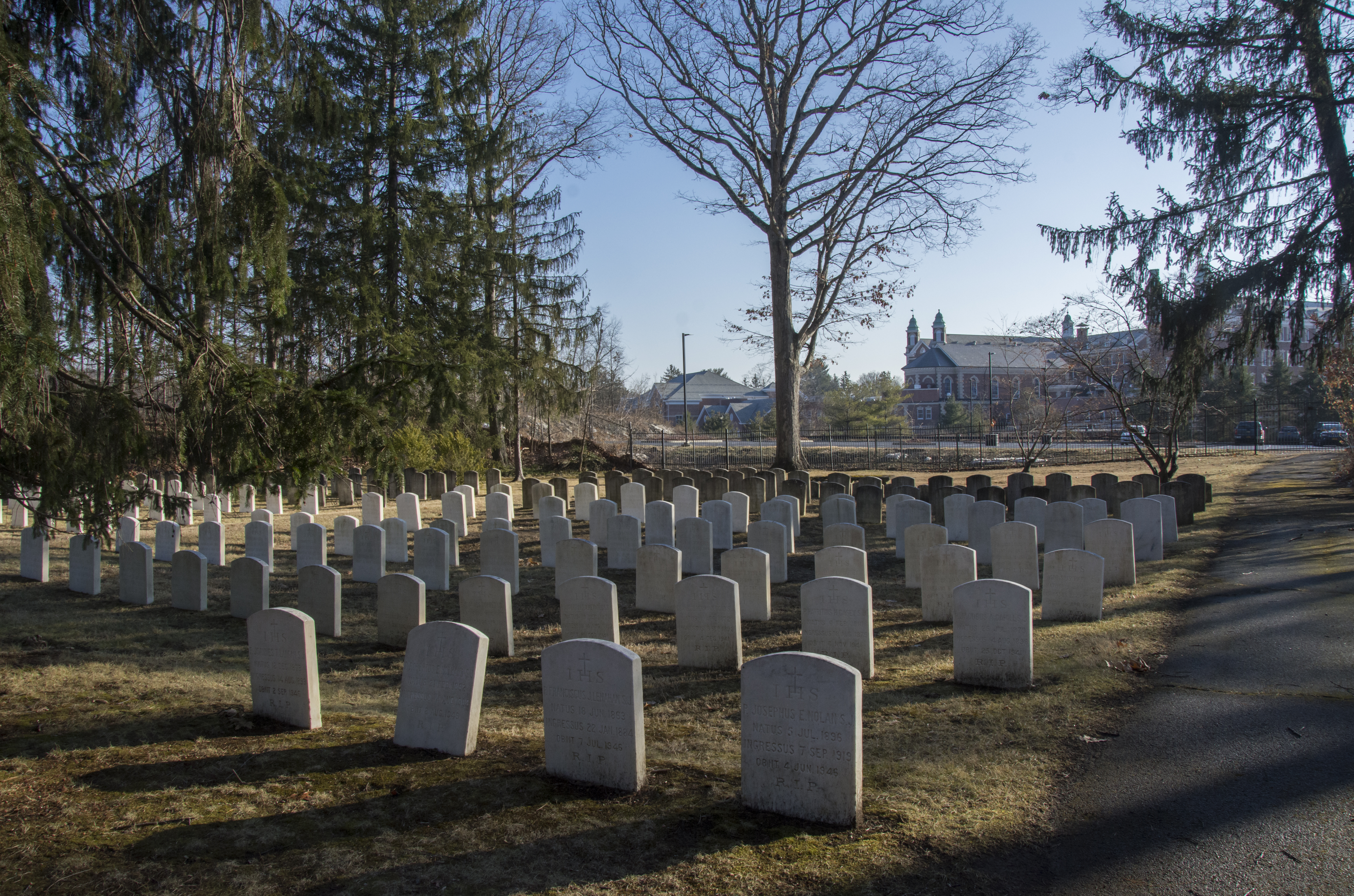
Jesuit cemetery on the property

In 1907, the present Jesuit cemetery was created in a filled-in swamp, replacing two previous burial grounds on the campus. Along with those exhumed from the prior cemetery, twenty-four bodies were brought from West Park across the river to the new cemetery. The cemetery was expanded an acre north in 1939 and began use in the late 1940s.

During the 1918 flu pandemic, four Jesuits died in less than a week in late January 1919. Also in that decade, several gazebos, pagodas, and other recreational or religious structures were built around the novitiate campus.

St. Andrew trained about 41 scholastic novices and 5 brother novices each year, and was at first the only novitiate in the province. Later on, provincial novitiates existed in Yonkers (1917–1923), Shadowbrook (1923–26), Wernersville, Pennsylvania (1930–42), and Plattsburgh (1955–59). The Shadowbrook. Wernersville, and Plattsburgh locations later became part of provinces subdivided from St. Andrew's. The novitiate's tertianship maintained about 28 tertians per year; it remained there until 1939 when it moved to Auriesville, New York. In the early 1920s, the novitiate also housed some first-year philosophers. Priests active in the community also stayed at St. Andrew-on-Hudson. A month after the novitiate's opening, one of the residing priests began to host Mass each week at Hudson River State Hospital, which was located a short distance down the road from St. Andrew. The psychiatric hospital had about 2,000 patients at the time, many of whom were Catholic.

By 1953, the Jesuits owned 704 acres (285 ha) with an assessed value of $157,000 ($1,889,300 in 2025), of which over three-quarters (446.5 acres) were east of Route 9; the Jesuits owned 257.5 acres west of Route 9. Their land had lawns, gardens, walkways, and recreational facilities. Only 60 acres west of the highway were cleared and developed at this point. The Jesuits used one quarter of their land on the east side for farming, with three-quarters remaining woodlands and overgrown brush.

The novitiate was moved to the Jesuit provincialate at Le Moyne College in Syracuse in 1968 and St. Andrew-on-Hudson was closed. The Syracuse provincialate was renamed St. Andrew Hall.

==== Notable people ====
Notable Jesuits to study or teach at St. Andrew's included James Demske, William Hogan, John LaFarge, Jr., Vincent McCormick, brothers Lorenzo, Francis, Paul, and John Reed, and Vincent Taylor. Beginning in 1905, the novitiate's founder and provincial over the region Edward Purbrick returned to teach as a tertian instructor there for two years. As well Zacheus J. Maher, assistant to the Superior General of the Society of Jesus, used St. Andrew-on-Hudson as his base of operations.

=== CIA campus ===
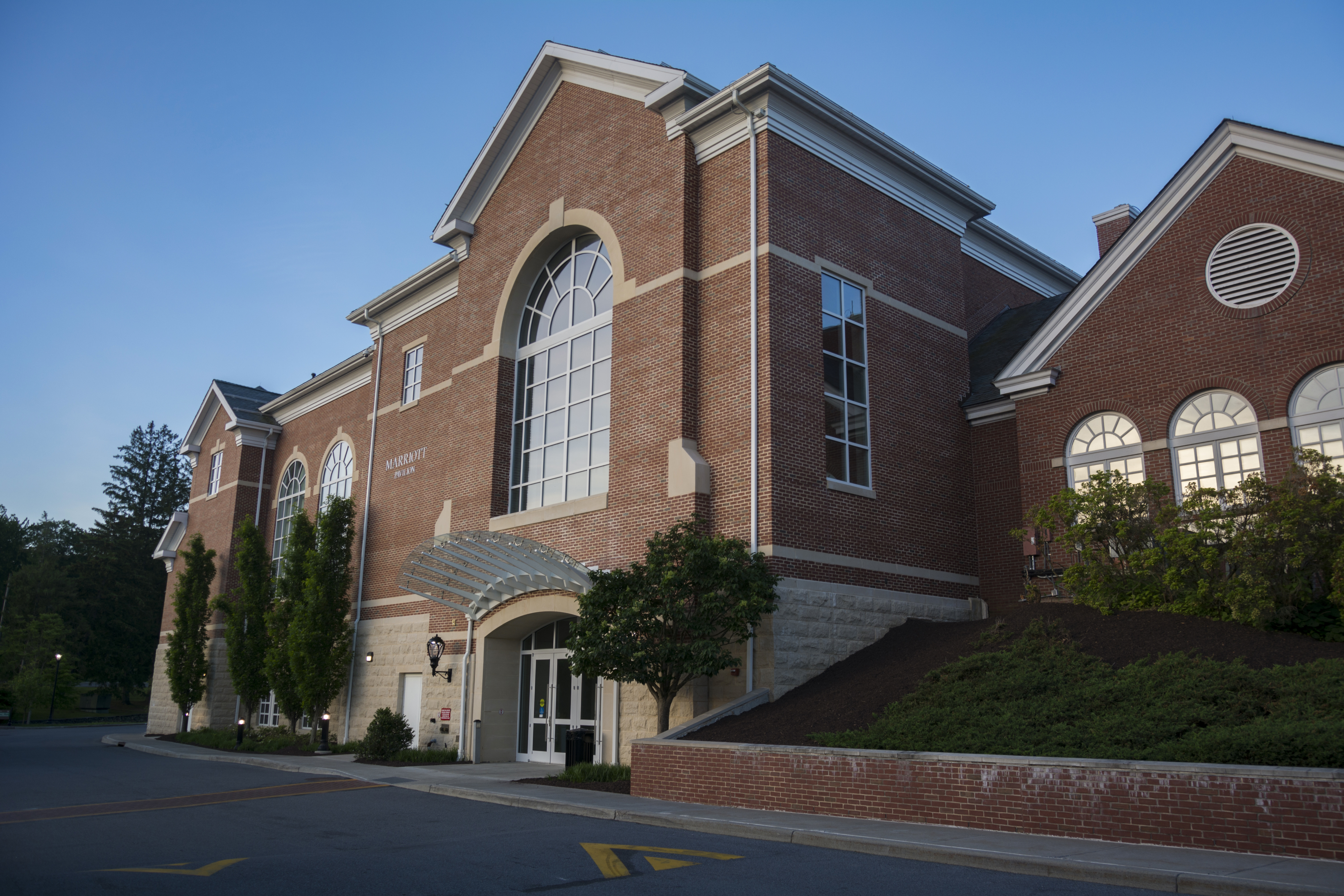
Marriott Pavilion

The Hyde Park property was sold to the Culinary Institute of America in 1970, and its main building became Roth Hall, the school's primary teaching and administration facility. The novitiate's chapel became Farquharson Hall, the main student dining facility in Roth Hall. Remnants of the Jesuit presence include a small cemetery, where philosopher and priest Pierre Teilhard de Chardin is interred.

Farquharson Hall, the main dining hall used for commencement and other ceremonies, was renamed in ceremony thanking John and Clara Farquharson in November 2002. The chapel, built in 1906 and dedicated November 1907 as St. Andrew's main chapel, has vaulted ceilings, stained glass windows, and murals, and seats 330. John Farquharson was a member of the school's board of trustees and was involved in food service, including at Aramark and the International Food Safety Council. Farquharson noticed the hall needed repair and donated $1.4 million to restore the building. John Canning Studios designed a 5-month restoration, which took place from May to September 2002, and restored lighting, carpets, ventilation, and audio systems. The Farquharson family crest was painted on the back wall of the room, along with portraits of Angell and Roth, and a skyscape mural on the ceiling. The hall's reopening ceremony involved a ribbon-cutting and lunch with the Amerscot Highland Pipe Band playing bagpipes.

In 2013, the school built its Marriott Pavilion Theater and Conference Center, which cost $19 million, $5 million of which was from the J. Willard and Alice S. Marriott Foundation. The Marriott Pavilion is now the location for the school's graduation ceremonies. The Half Moon Theatre Company, a Broadway-style group formed in 2006, has operated out of the pavilion's theater since 2014.

== Grounds ==
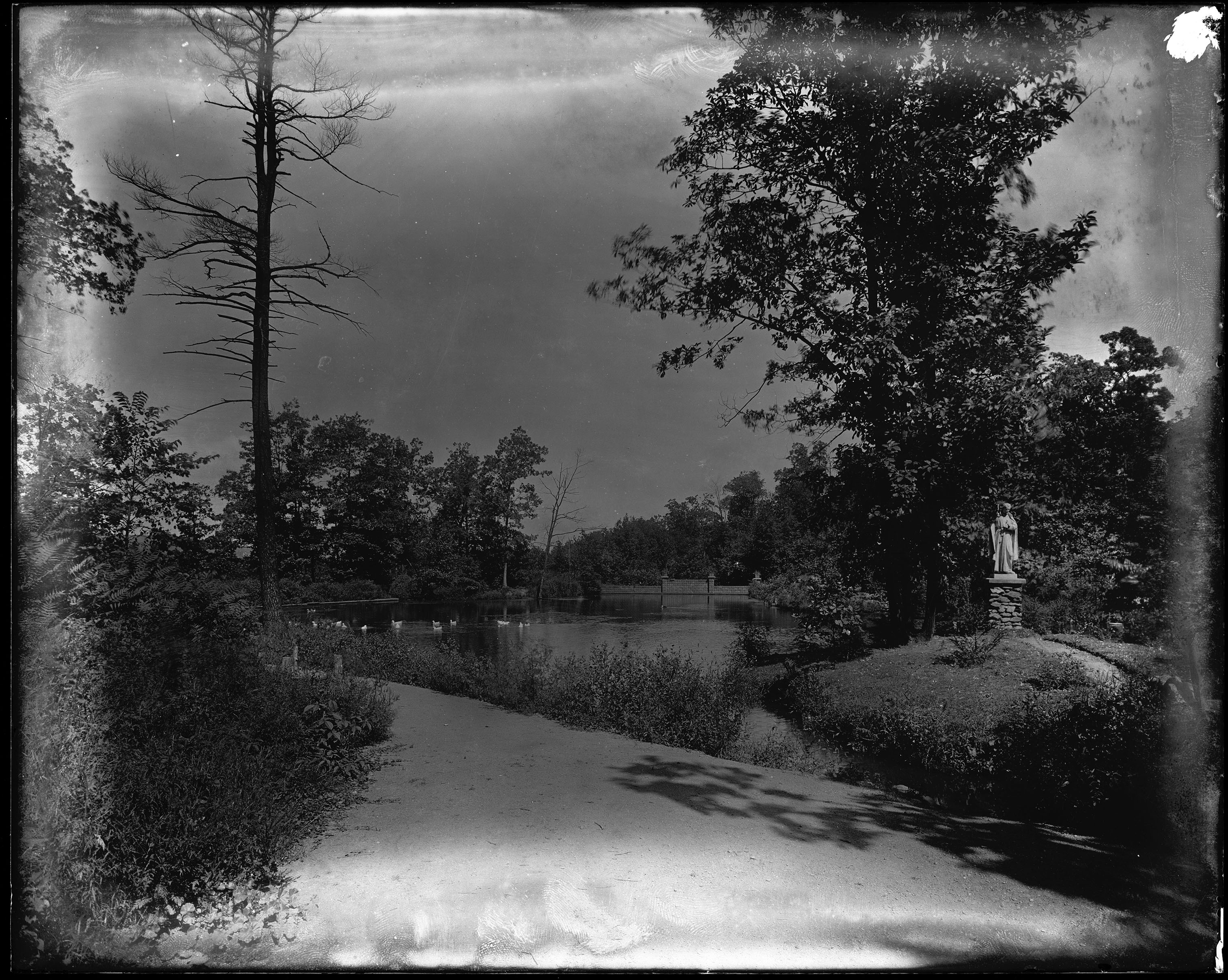
Xavier Lake, 1920

The 70-acre (28 ha) campus is about three miles north of the city of Poughkeepsie and 80 miles north of New York City. It is located on the Hudson River, at a point where the river is about one-half mile (0.80 km) wide. The property has steep and varied banks against the river's edge. The average temperatures include a low of 11 °F (−12 °C) in January and a 79 °F (26 °C) average high in September; there are about 119 days of precipitation per year.

The grounds contain several small lakes or ponds, including one first known as the Upper Hollow Pond, then as Xavier Lake. The lake was first created in 1904, when each winter, the novitiate's juniors would dam a small stream with boards and clay; they would use the lake for ice skating. In 1911 the novices constructed a dam on the lake's north side and a spillway on its west side. In 1919, a statue of Saint Francis Xavier was placed on the lake's island, and thus the lake became known after him.

Another lake, known as Swimming Lake, was created in 1916 after Xavier Lake's spillway created a swampland nearby. In 1916 a dam was created, and in 1926 the lake was drained and cleaned to allow swimming. A northern overflow of Xavier Lake created another swamp, which became Hockey Lake in 1934.

Also on the campus is the residence of the school's president, part of the school's property.

=== Safety And Security ===
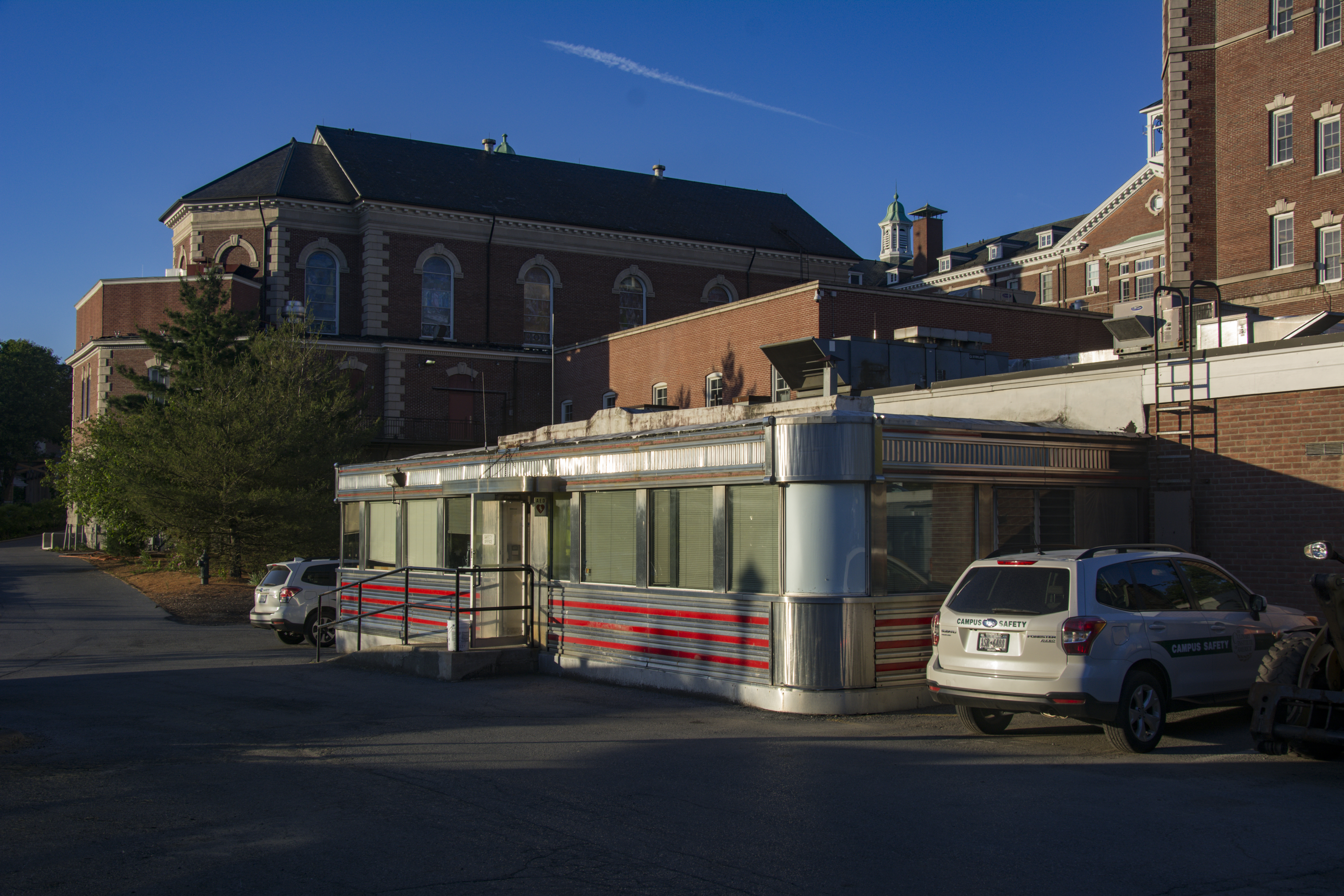
The 1950s diner operated as Campus Safety

Safety and security is primarily handled by the college's Campus Safety department. The Campus Safety department maintains a 24-hour presence on campus and is responsible for emergency control, parking and policy enforcement, as well as crime prevention. Security escorts are provided by Campus Safety to students, guest, faculty and staff. The college's grounds and buildings are monitored by a CCTV camera system. Certain buildings on campus, such as dormitories, require an activated access badge in order to gain access.

The Campus Safety office is located inside of a red diner building behind Roth Hall. The diner was constructed by Mountain View Diners Company in New Jersey and purchased by the CIA in 1971. The school transported, refurbished, and attached it to a preexisting building, an outbuilding of the Jesuit seminary. The diner, referred to as the school's "coffee shop", originally served as a fast food restaurant for students; the CIA president and vice president had desired some fast food training in the curriculum, as the style was very prevalent at the time. The Walgreen Company, which operated similar restaurants at that time, donated $25,000 to the school for the diner restaurant. In 1978, the Wechler Corporation donated an additional $20,000 donation, and the facility became known as the Wechler Coffee Shop.

== Academics ==
=== Restaurants ===
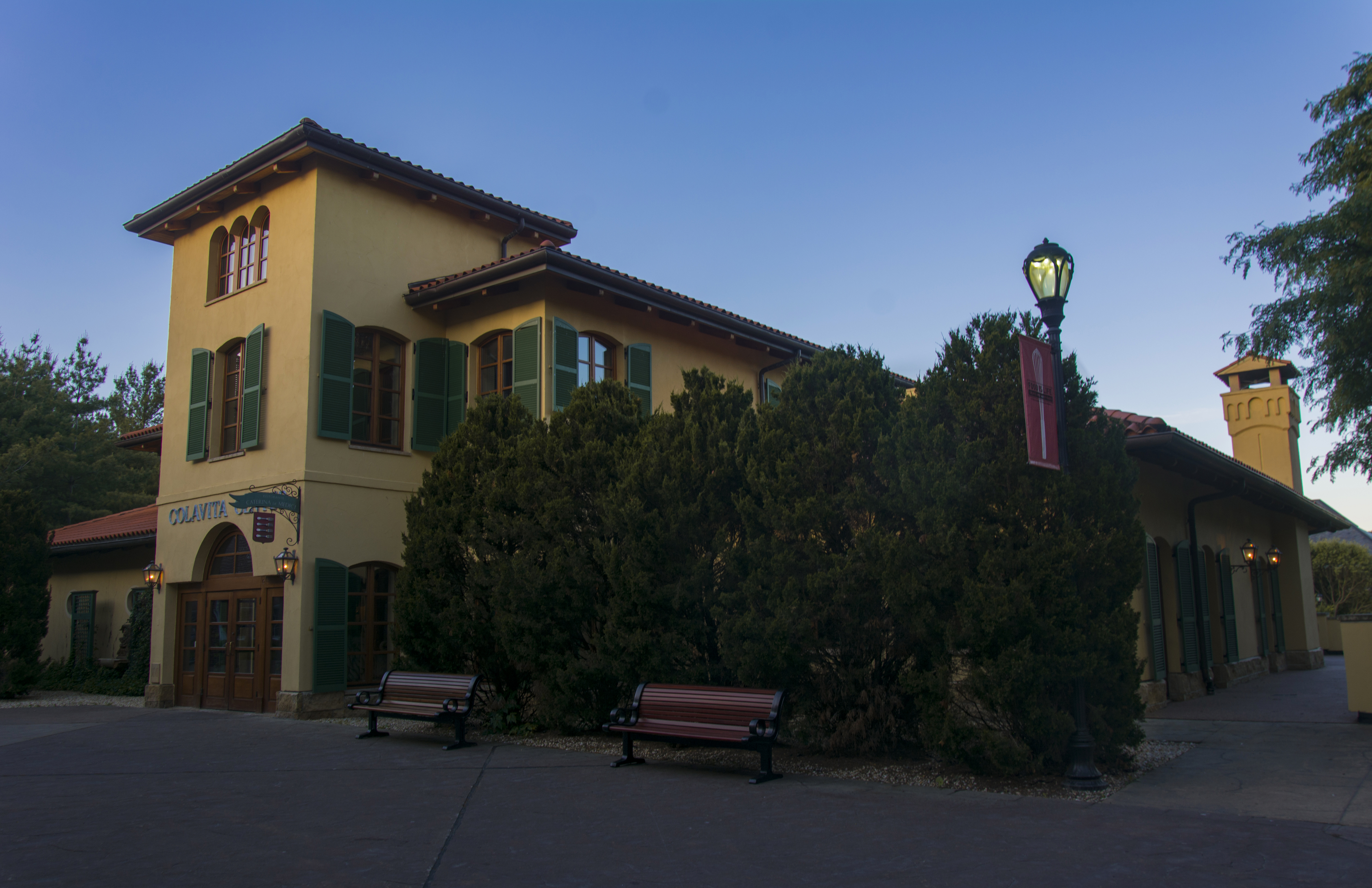
The school's Italian restaurant, Ristorante Caterina de' Medici

The Hyde Park campus operates four public restaurants for students to gain experience in kitchen and management skills. Food served at the American Bounty Restaurant highlights Hudson Valley produce and is prepared in the style of cuisines of the Americas. The Bocuse Restaurant serves traditional French food using modern techniques. It was the first of the school's restaurants, and opened as the Epicurean Room and Rabalais Grill in 1973, before being renamed the Escoffier Restaurant (after Auguste Escoffier) in 1974. In 2012 it was again renamed to honor Paul Bocuse, and given a $3 million renovation by Adam Tihany. The Ristorante Caterina de' Medici is a restaurant with a focus on authentic Italian food. The Apple Pie Bakery Café has a casual atmosphere and serves sandwiches, soups, and baked foods.

The school also frequently creates on-campus pop-up restaurants, including Post Road Brew House. The second of the campus' pop-ups, the gastropub opened in February 2016 in the General Foods Nutrition Center (formerly St. Andrew's Cafe).

==== Caterina de' Medici ====
The student-run Ristorante Caterina de' Medici was moved to a new location in May 2001, when the Colavita Center for Italian Food and Wine was built for $6.7 million. Roberto Magin, a Florentine architect, designed the building.

==== Bocuse Restaurant ====
The Bocuse Restaurant serves contemporary French food. It opened on May 5, 2012 after a $3 million renovation designed by Adam Tihany. Originally the Epicurian Room, and renamed the Escoffier Restaurant in 1974, the restaurant originally served classical French cuisine in an old-fashioned formal French dining room. It had French chandeliers, gilded mirrors, patterned carpets, and high-backed chairs. The redesign intended it to now resemble a brasserie, with polished steel lights, smoked-oak floors, and bentwood armchairs.

The new restaurant would also do away with traditional kitchen stations and hierarchy previously common in the restaurant industry, and would double the size of the restaurant kitchen. A new station was included to sous vide food. Another modernization is to have seasonal ingredients dictate the menu, as opposed to the previous restaurant's dishes dictating the ingredients purchased.

CIA graduates who worked in the Escoffier Restaurant included Grant Achatz, Jonathan Benno, Anthony Bourdain, David Burke, Harold Dieterle, Todd English, Susan Feniger, Larry Forgione, Johnny Iuzzini, and Bradley Ogden.

== Student life ==
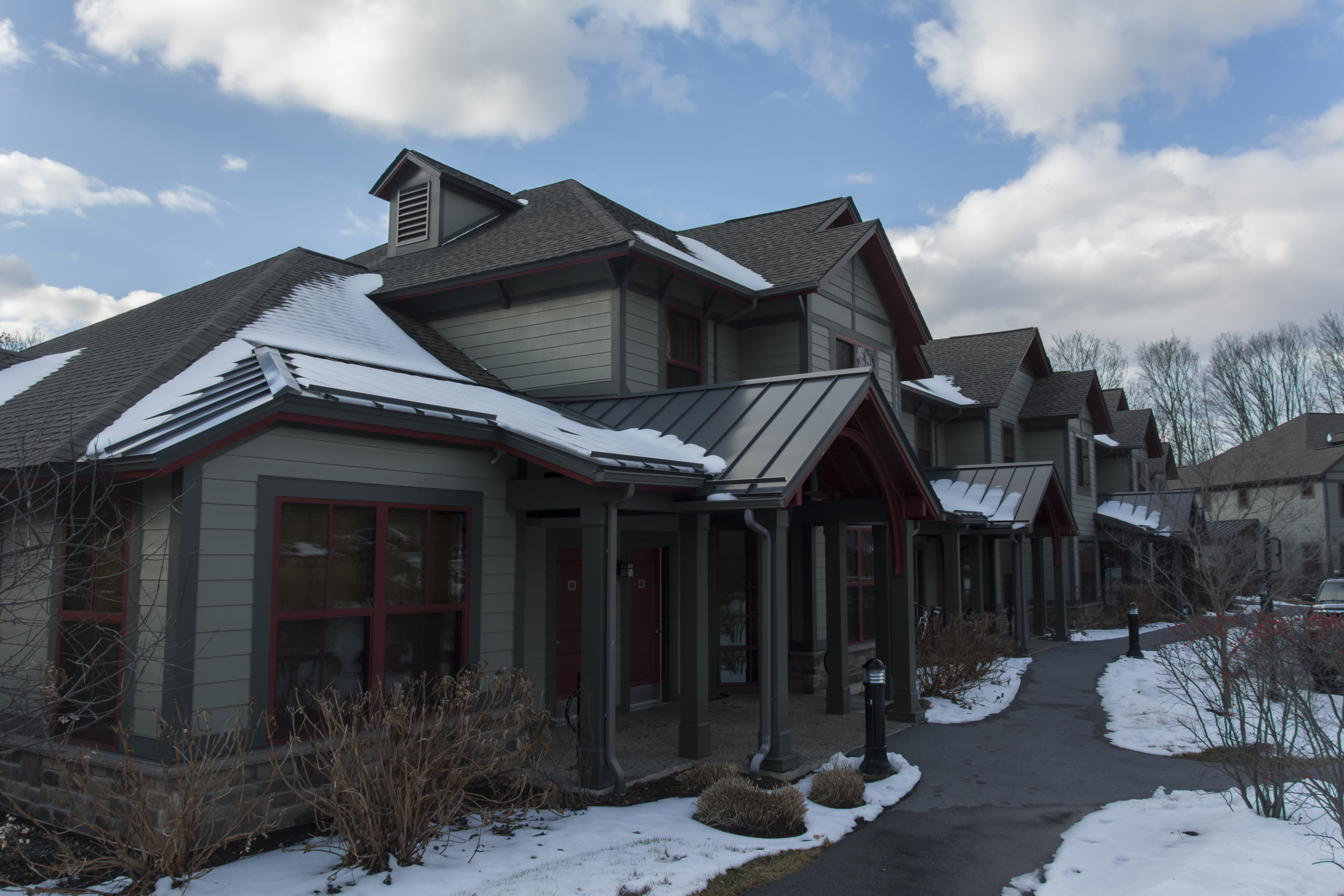
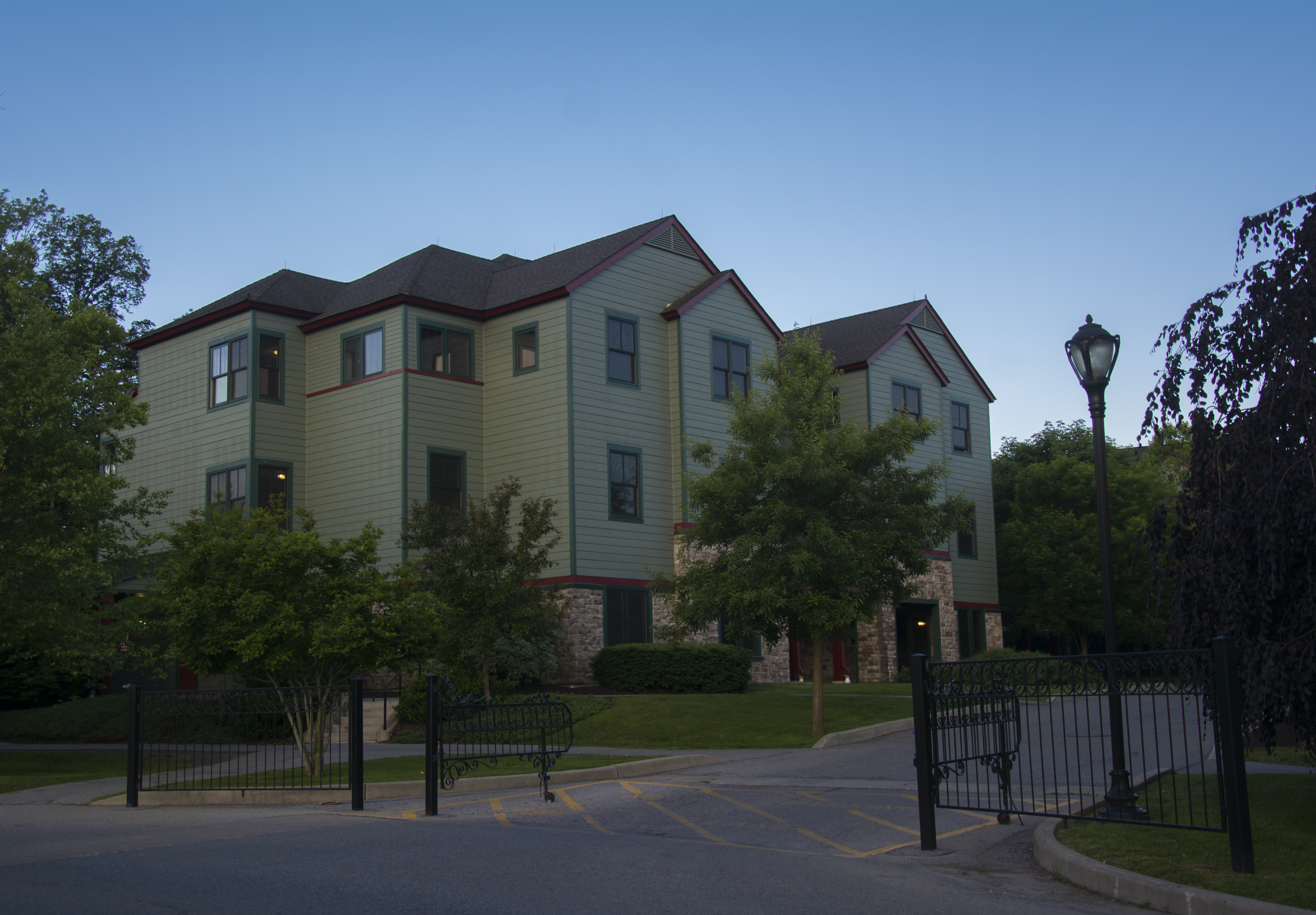
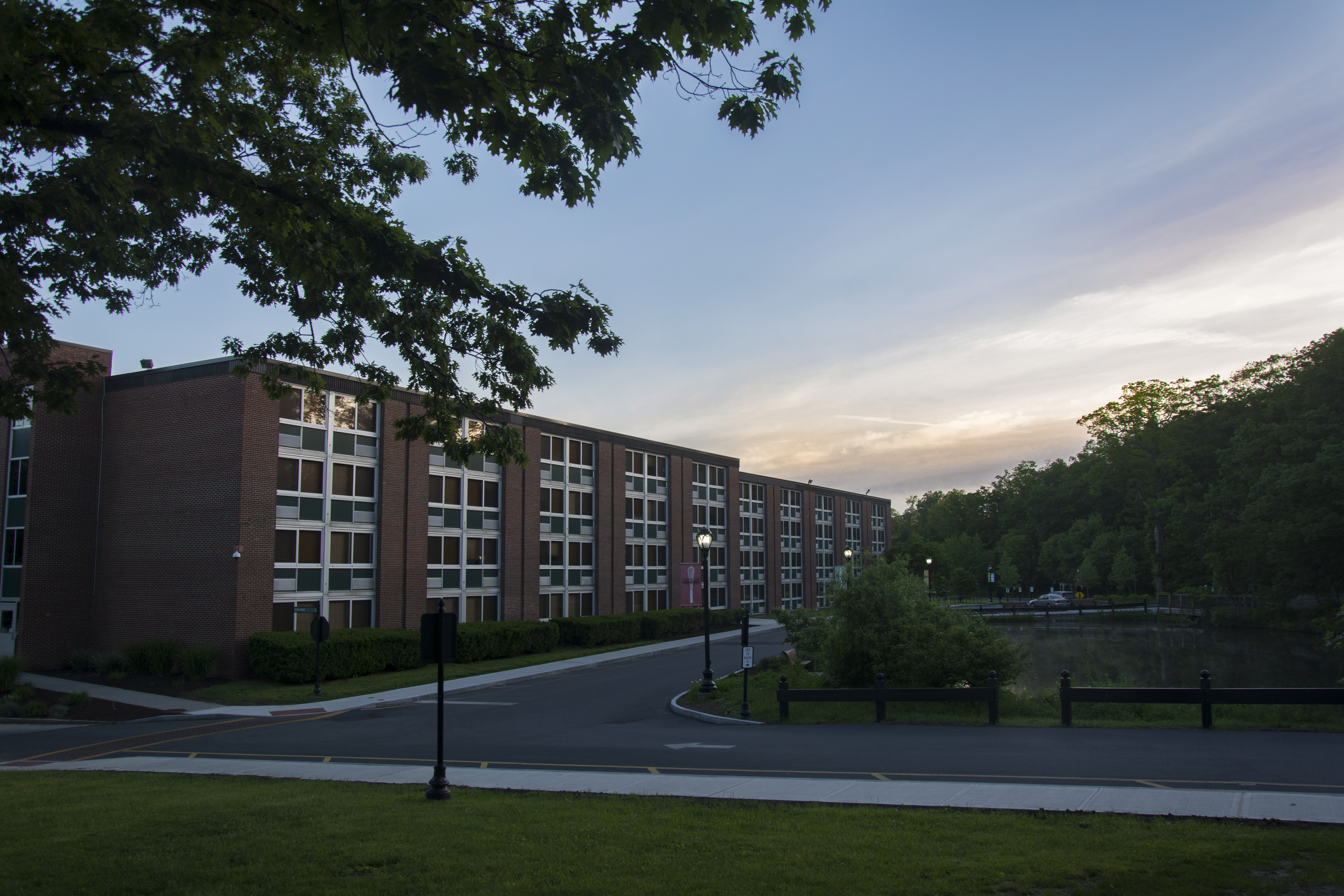
Three primary styles of residence halls: the townhouses, lodges, and the original residence halls

The campus offers intercollegiate, intramural, and club athletics, playing under the name "Steels". Its intercollegiate program began in 2004, and is affiliated with the Hudson Valley Intercollegiate Athletic Conference. 11% of the student body participates in the school's intramural sports, and 3% in its intercollegiate sports. These include men's and women's basketball, cross-country, soccer, and tennis, and women's volleyball. The school also has about 27 student organizations, including three religious groups, one honor society, and one LGBT group. It does not offer any Greek life organizations.

The campus' student newspaper, La Papillote, was established in 1979. The newspaper's primary mission is to report school news and current events in the food industry. The paper is published by the school's Student Affairs Division, and usually has three student editors, including the editor-in-chief and two copy editors. The paper uses submissions from students, chefs, and outside professionals. The paper succeeds about eighteen other student newspapers at the school, dating back to its opening in 1946.

In May 2008, La Papillote was prevented from reporting on a dispute against the school's president, who later apologized and allowed a full report in the paper's next issue. The president L. Timothy Ryan held that he was trying to prevent students from being involved in a conflict between the faculty and administration.

=== Student Commons ===
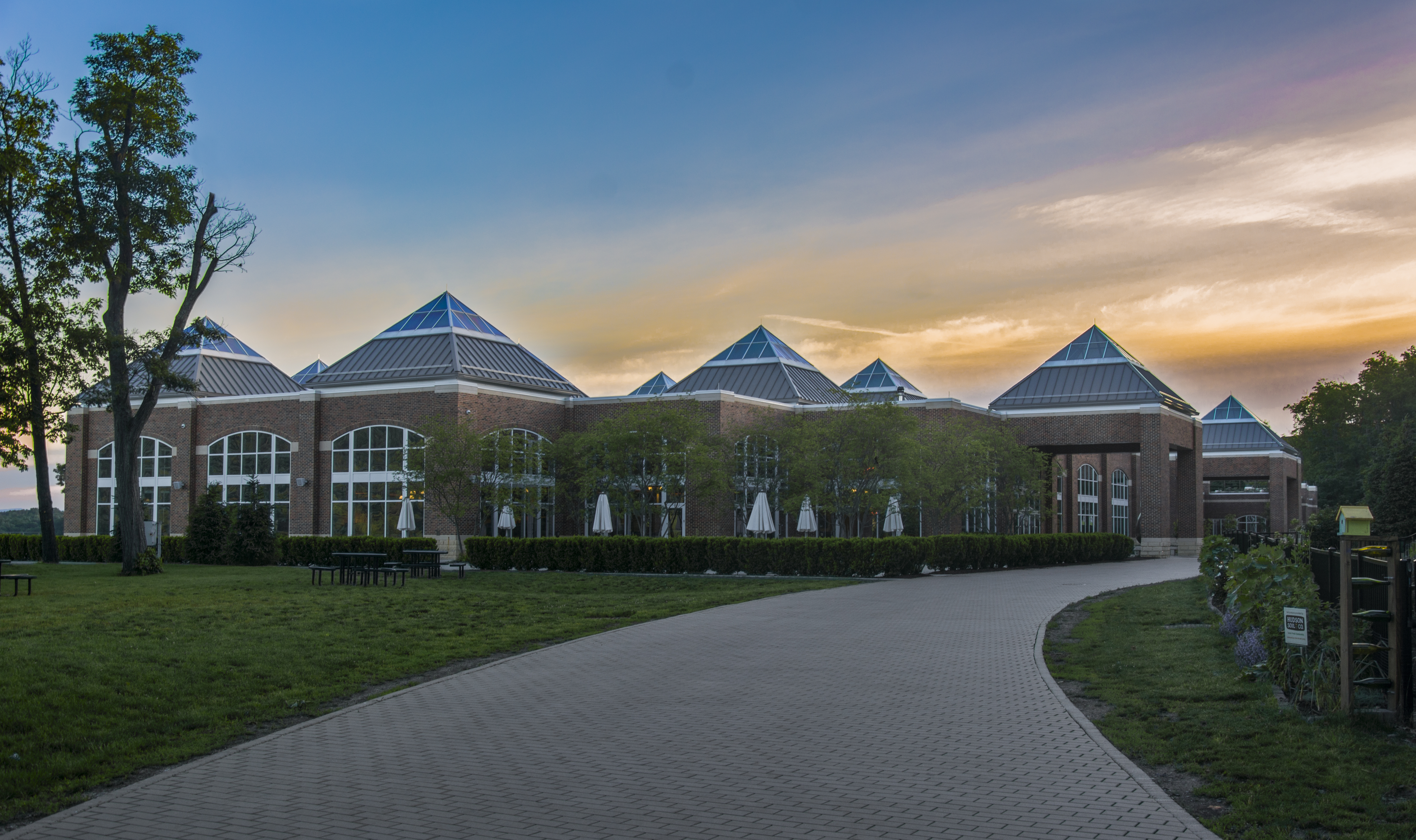
Student Commons, holding the recreation center and the Egg dining hall

Student Commons opened as the Student Recreation Center in July 1998. It has 56,246 square feet (5,225.4 m^{2}) and cost $9 million. The building has two racquetball courts, two full-seize collegiate basketball/volleyball courts, an indoor running track, a 25-yard 6-lane lap swimming pool, fitness center, aerobics/spinning room, locker rooms with saunas, club meeting room and student lounge, offices and meeting spaces for student clubs, multi-purpose conference room, and had the Courtside Deli Café & Pub.

As part of a Stormwater Pollution Prevention Plan, the CIA built a garden on top of the student commons building during its renovation. The garden takes in water, leading less rainwater to wash trash into the Hudson. The school's 12-member grounds staff maintains the garden, growing berries which are used in the school's classes and restaurants.

=== Dining halls ===
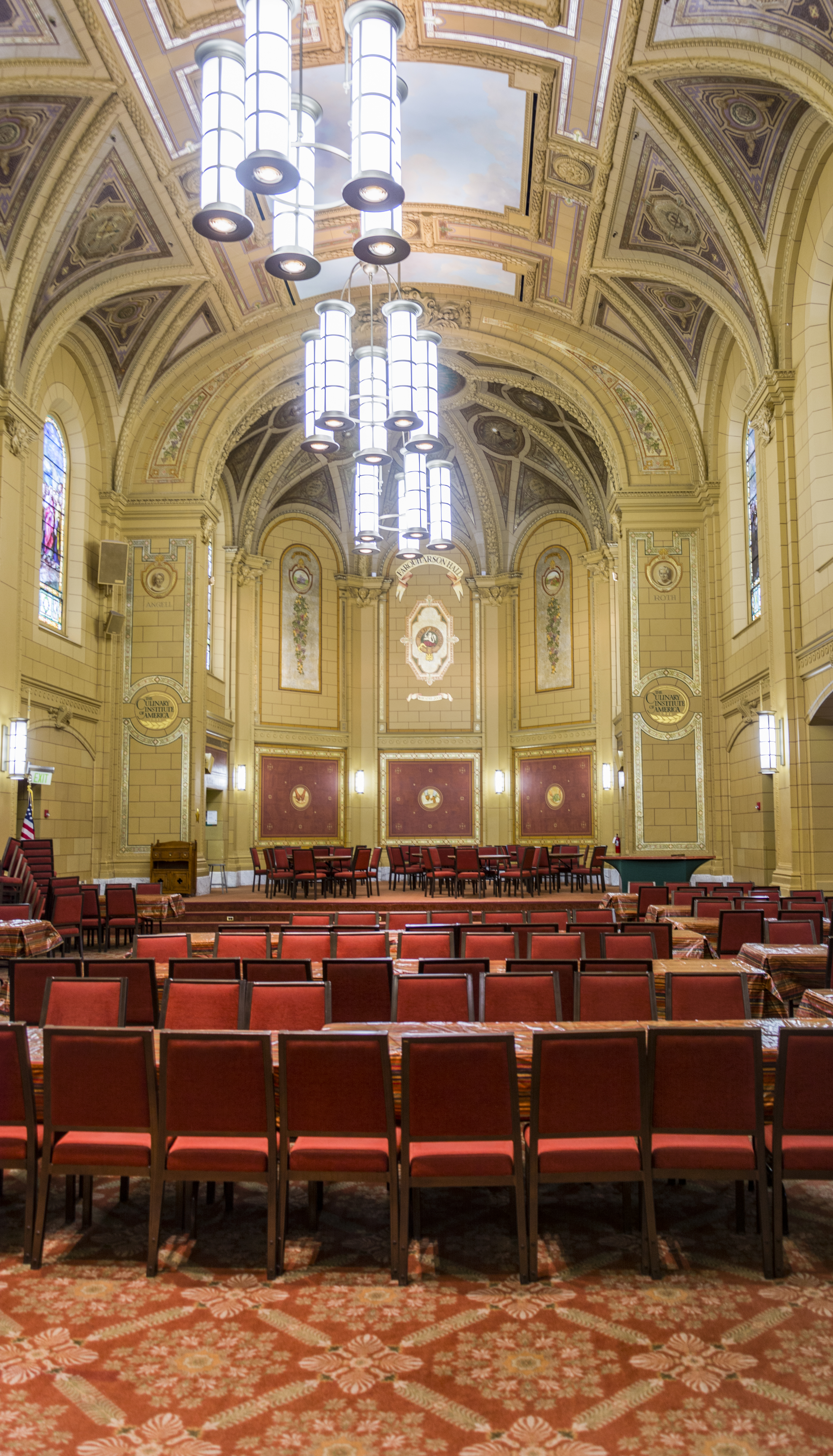
St. Andrew's main chapel, now Farquharson Hall

The first dining hall at the CIA was built in 1906 as a chapel; the Jesuits had constructed it as their main chapel to replace smaller chapels in the building. The Jesuits built smaller chapels including altars at each alcove of the hall, and had a pipe organ in front of the main altar off to the left. Upon the CIA's purchase, the chapel was converted into a dining hall, known as Alumni Hall. In 2002, the dining hall was renovated and renamed Farquharson Hall.

In June 2015, the school opened the Egg, a 550-seat dining hall on the Hudson River. The dining hall also serves as a kitchen classroom, where students prepare food for the areas known as the Innovation Kitchen, the Line, and the Brooklyn Brewery. The Brooklyn Brewery was established with New York City company Brooklyn Brewery, which sponsored the on-campus brewery and trained staff. The brewery has a full-time brewer, assisted by bachelor's students in the beverage concentration. The Innovation Kitchen is staffed by students in the intrapreneurship concentration. The students break into groups and create a business plan, including marketing, menus, and a human resources manual. The Line is operated by students and has a cycling menu which changes every three weeks and seasonally. The Egg also has a separate cooking suite, the Café, which serves hot foods, coffee, and sushi. The dining hall has an open plan and a variety of decor, including lounge areas, dining tables, a retail food and beverage market, large television screens, a stage for entertainment and cooking demonstrations, and outdoor patios. The hall also has a private dining room and a lounge area with a fireplace and library.

The dining hall is named after eggs as used for cooking, and it features a large metal sculpture of an egg at its entrance.

== See also ==
- History of the Culinary Institute of America
- List of Jesuit sites
