= Mountain View Diners Company =

Mountain View Diners Company, established by Les Daniel and Henry Strys in the Singac section of Little Falls, New Jersey, to manufacture prefabricated diners, operated from 1939 to 1957, selling diners that were shipped nationwide. "A Mountain View Diner will last a lifetime" was the company motto. Their pre-World War II diner models usually incorporated late Art Deco styling, few were produced during the war years. Post-war, streamline styling then in vogue was used. The company ceased operation in 1957 after producing over 400 diners. Subsequent to 1957, Les Daniel II established Mountain View Auto body. It is currently owned and operated by Les Daniel III.

== Partial list of Mountain View diners ==
Selected examples

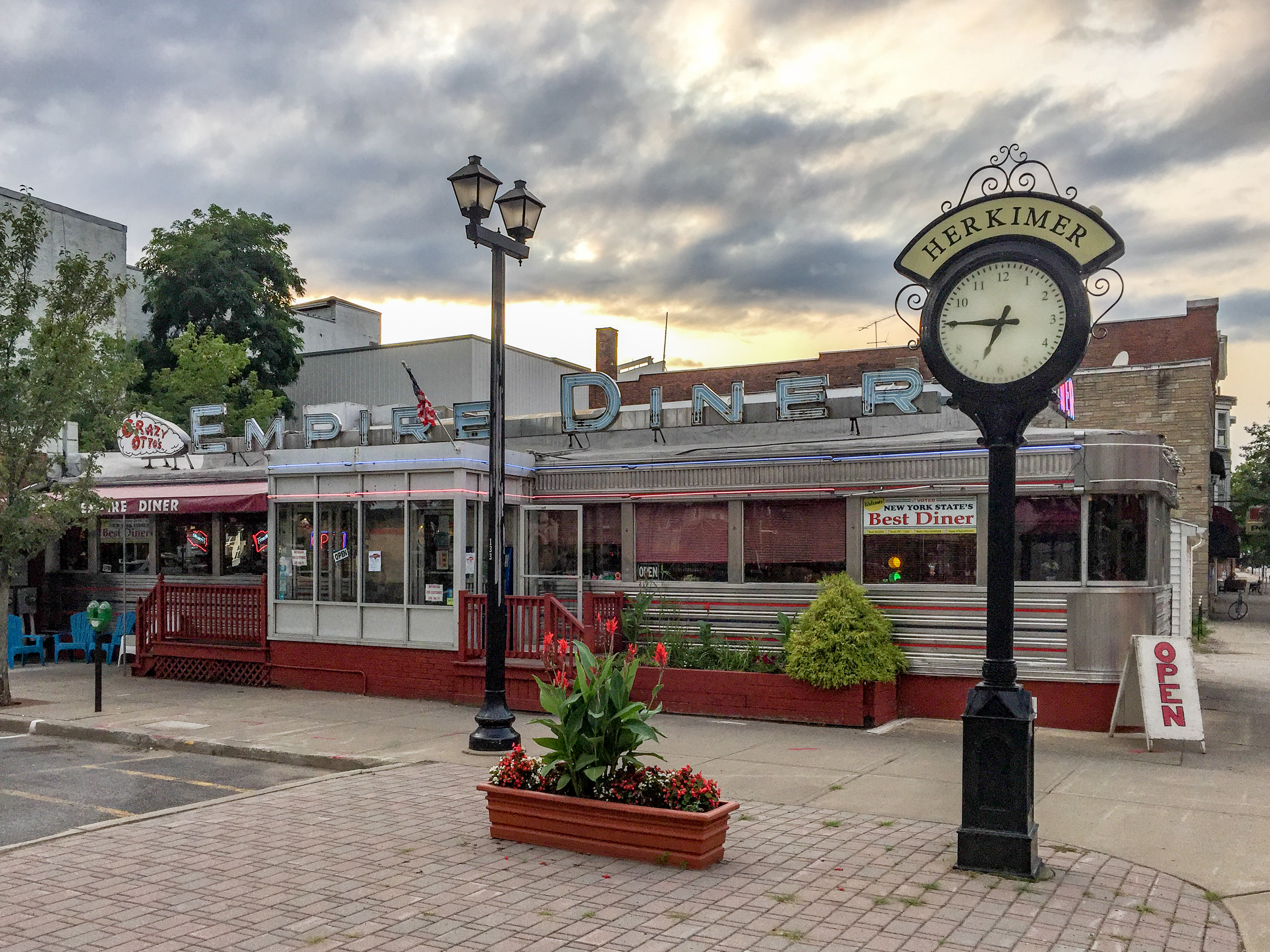
Crazy Otto's Empire Diner, Herkimer, New York

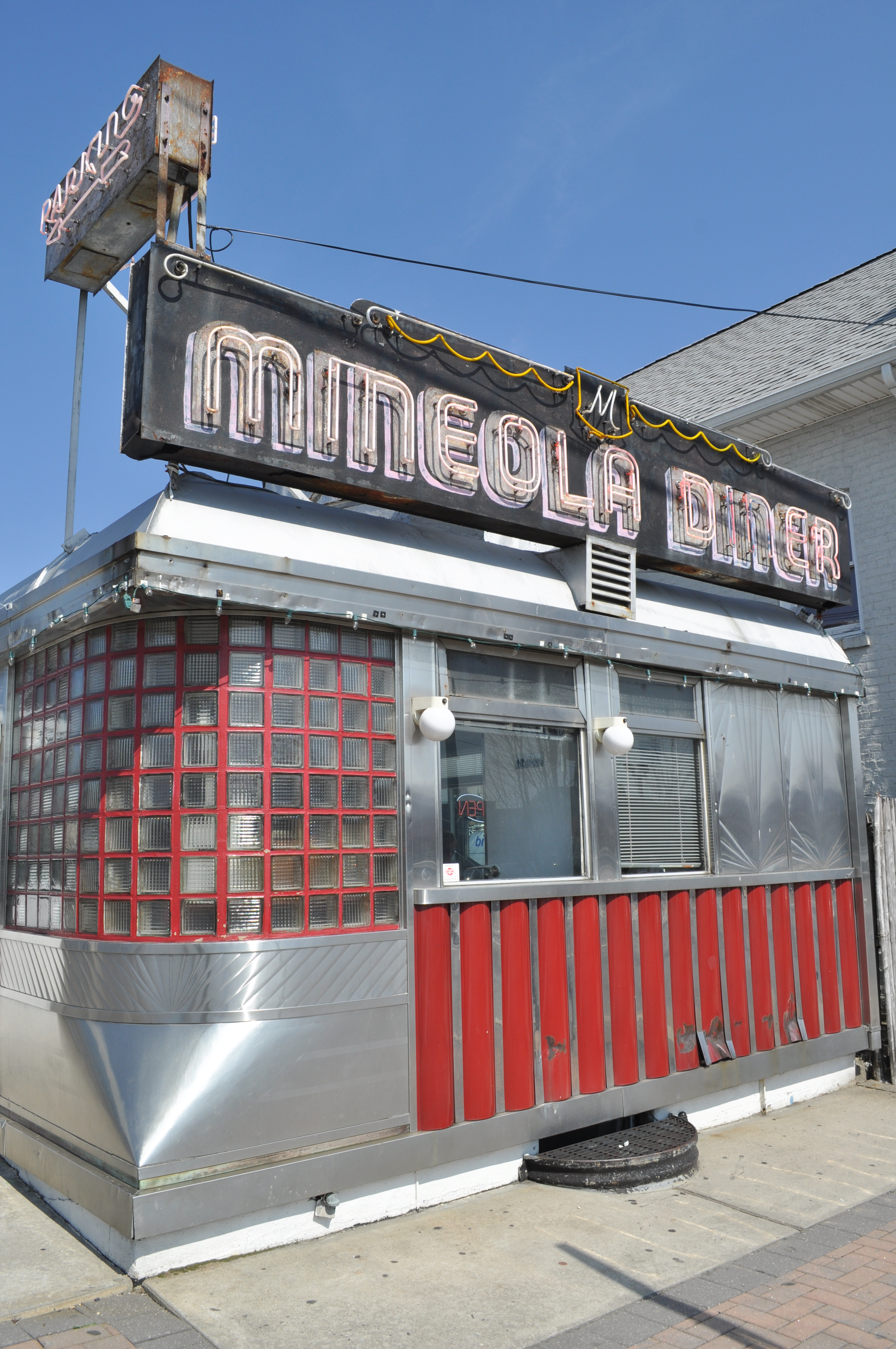
Mineola Diner, Mineola, New York

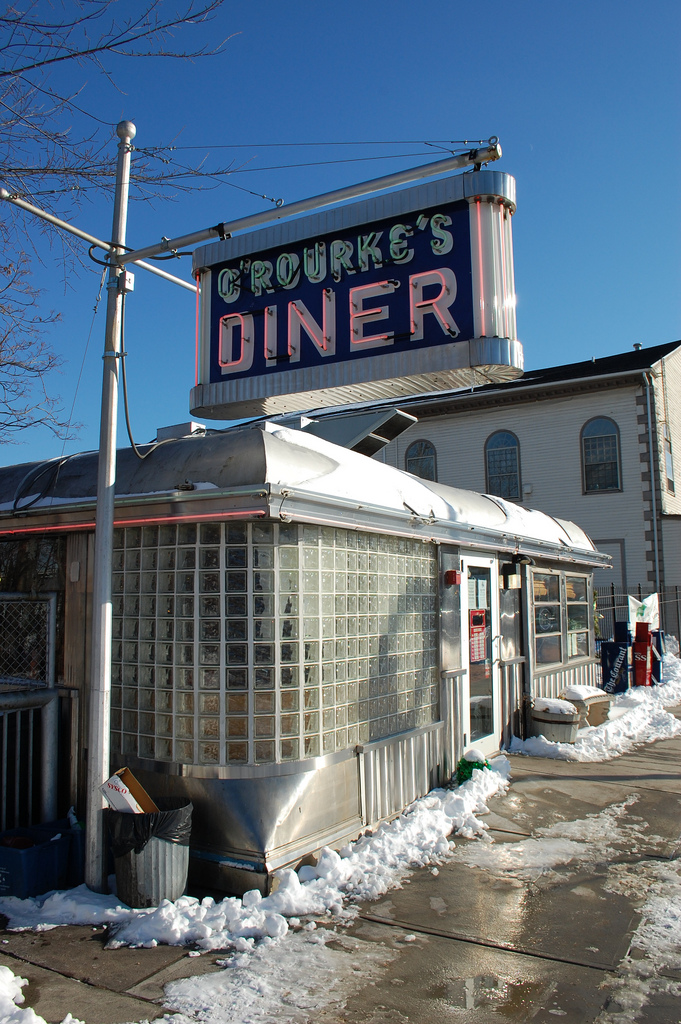
O'Rourke's Diner, Middletown, Connecticut

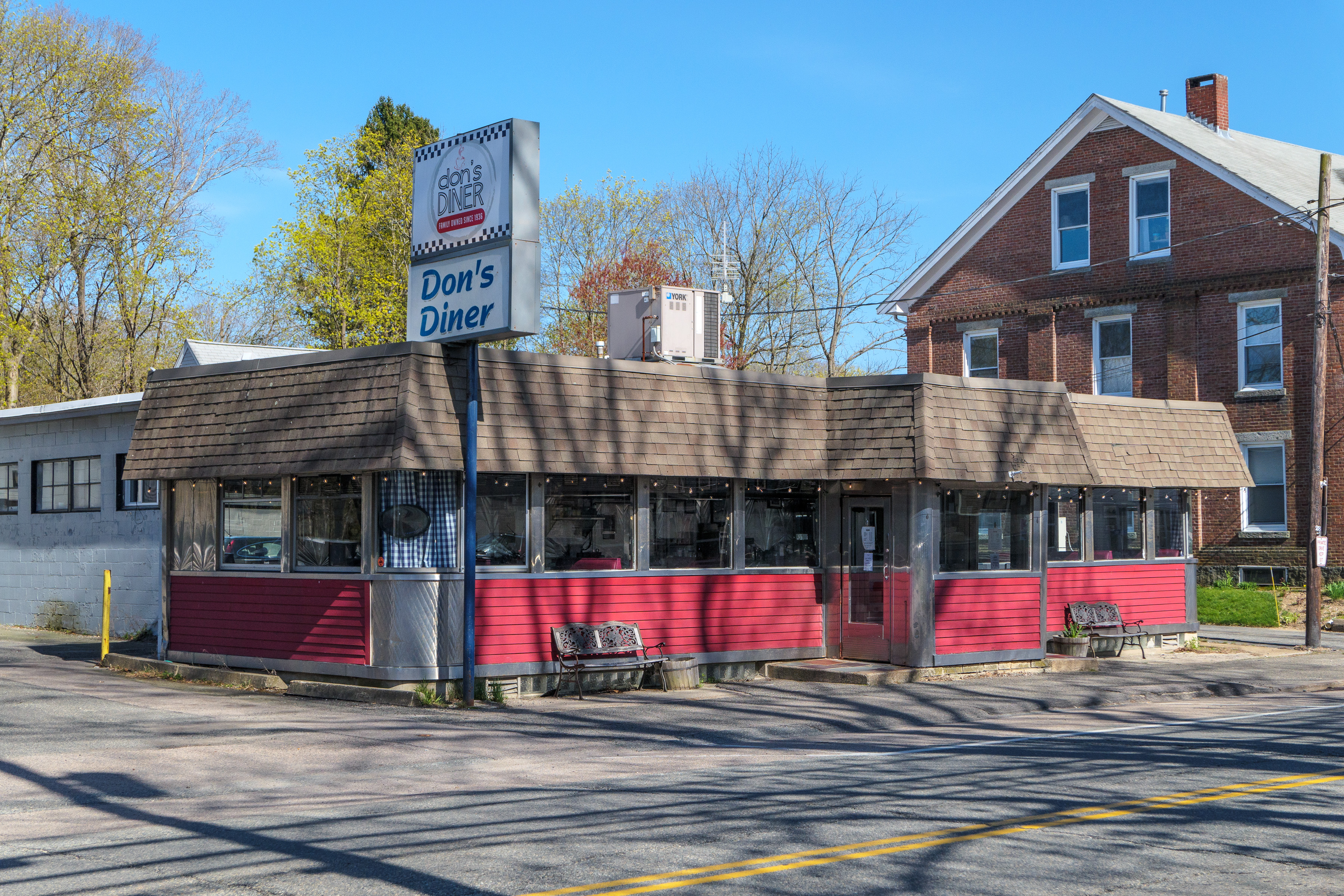
Don's Diner, Plainville, Massachusetts

Sorted by Serial # where known:

- (# 234) TJ’s Pit Stop Charles Town, West Virginia
- (# 236) Mineola Diner Mineola, New York
- (# 237) Bob's Diner Queens, New York
- (# 256) New York Ham & Eggery Diner Long Island City, New York
- (# 267) Colonial Diner Lyndhurst, New Jersey
- (# 281) Red Robin Diner Johnson City, New York
- (# 288) El Miski White Plains, New York
- (# 289) Chick's Diner Scranton, Pennsylvania
- (# 295) Paris Diner Brooklyn, New York
- (# 296) Neptune Diner Lancaster, Pennsylvania
- (# 301) Lee's Diner York, Pennsylvania
- (# 307) Gibby's Diner Delanson, New York
- (# 308) Wethersfield Diner Wethersfield, Connecticut
- (# 309) Pandolfi's Mattapoisett Diner Mattapoisett, Massachusetts
- (# 310) Crazy Dog Diner Westhampton Beach, New York
- (# 313) Trolley Car Diner Philadelphia, Pennsylvania
- (# 314) Burch's Family Restaurant Gary, Indiana
- (# 317 ) Betty-Ann's Diner Plaistow, New Hampshire
- (# 326) Hollywood Diner Baltimore, Maryland
- (# 328) Jack's Hollywood Diner Hollywood, Florida
- (# 330) Crazy Otto's Empire Diner Herkimer, New York
- (# 343) Blue Point Diner Blue Point, New York
- (# 356) Daddypop's Diner Hatboro, Pennsylvania
- (# 359) Bel-Aire Diner Peabody, Massachusetts
- (# 361) D-K Diner West Chester, Pennsylvania
- (# 368) Pioneer Diner Wichita Falls, Texas
- (# 369) Oasis Diner Burlington, Vermont
- (# 399) West Taghkanic Diner Ancram, New York
- (# 401) Karter's Diner-Eliots Diner-Kentucky Diner Milwaukee, Waukesha, Louisville, Kentucky
- (# 414) Jolly Donut Sandusky, Ohio
- (# 425) 54 Diner Buena, New Jersey
- (# 428) Patriot Diner Bourne, Massachusetts
- (# 440) Maybrook Diner, Maybrook, New York
- (# 441) Jackson Hole East Elmhurst, New York
- (# 445) Tandoor Indian Restaurant New Haven, Connecticut
- (# 446) Lake Effect Diner Buffalo, New York
- (# 457) Betsy's Diner Falmouth, Massachusetts
- (# 508) Scarfalloto's Town House Diner (Honesdale, Pennsylvania)
- (# 489) Sandy's Diner Front Royal, Virginia
- (# 498) Relish Diner Brooklyn, New York
- (# 514) Lou's Farm Mart Bensalem, Pennsylvania
- (# 516) Davie's Chuck Wagon Diner Lakewood, Colorado
- (# 522) Sally's Diner Erie, Pennsylvania
- (# 532) Route 66 Diner Springfield, Massachusetts
- (# 534) Main Line Diner (Formerly Maybrook Diner), Maybrook, New York
- 29 Diner Fairfax, Virginia
- Annabelle's Diner Mentor, Ohio
- Ben's Diner Lawrenceville, New Jersey
- Bilal's Oasis Trenton, New Jersey
- Bluebird Diner Brooklyn, New York
- Blue Comet Hazleton, Pennsylvania
- Blue Sky Queens, New York
- Bobbie's Diner Savannah, Georgia
- Bob's Diner Columbia, Pennsylvania
- Centennial Diner Atlantic City, New Jersey
- Chuck Wagon Princetown, New York
- Cookstown Diner Cookstown, New Jersey
- Culinary Institute of America campus Hyde Park, New York
- Diner Indianapolis, Indiana
- Don's Diner Plainville, Massachusetts
- Family Diner Norwalk, Connecticut
- Farmington Diner Wilton, Maine
- (# 420) Flo's Roadside Diner Clarks Hill, Indiana
- Giordano's Diner Hamilton, New Jersey
- (# 302) Glider Diner Scranton, Pennsylvania
- Joe's Diner Cincinnati, Ohio
- Kasteli Diner Mount Vernon, New York
- Lark Diner Larksville, Pennsylvania
- Mickey's Windham Diner Willimantic, Connecticut
- Magnolia Diner Joppa, Maryland
- Moosic Diner Moosic, Pennsylvania
- Morgan's Eastland Diner Irwin, Pennsylvania
- (#197) O'Rourke's Diner Middletown, Connecticut
- Panini Deli & Grill Queens, New York
- Pearl Diner Dayton, Ohio
- Pelican Diner St. Petersburg, Florida
- Pig 'N Whistle Brighton, Massachusetts
- Silver Diner Waterbury, Connecticut
- Subway Indianapolis, Indiana
- Terminal Diner, Cleveland Heights, Ohio
- Trail Diner New Milford, Pennsylvania
- Oasis Diner Plainfield, Indiana
- Village Diner Milford, Pennsylvania
- West Market Diner New York City

== See also ==
- List of diners
