= Singac, New Jersey =

Populated place in Passaic County, New Jersey, US

- Census-designated place
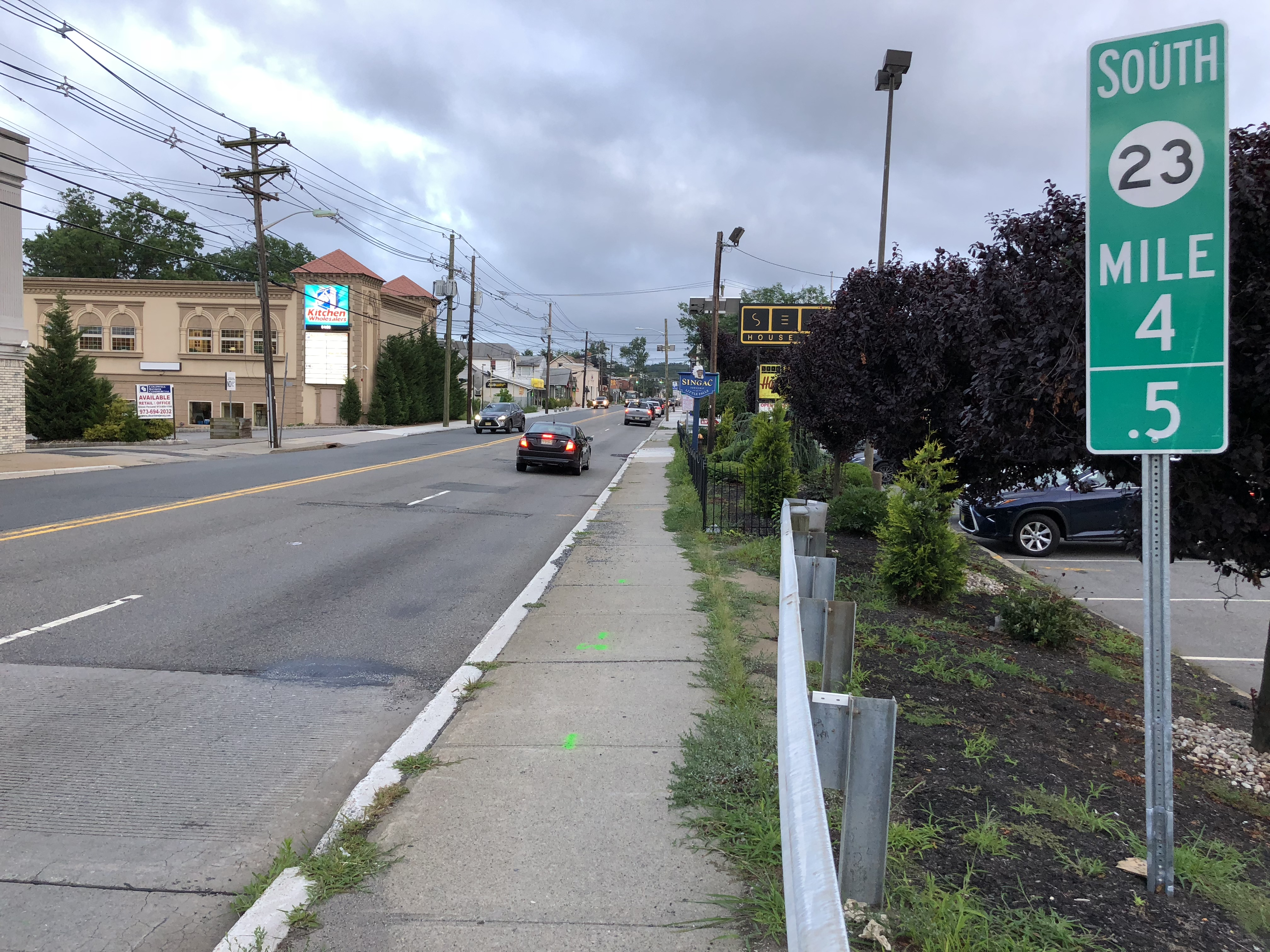
- Route 23 southbound entering Singac

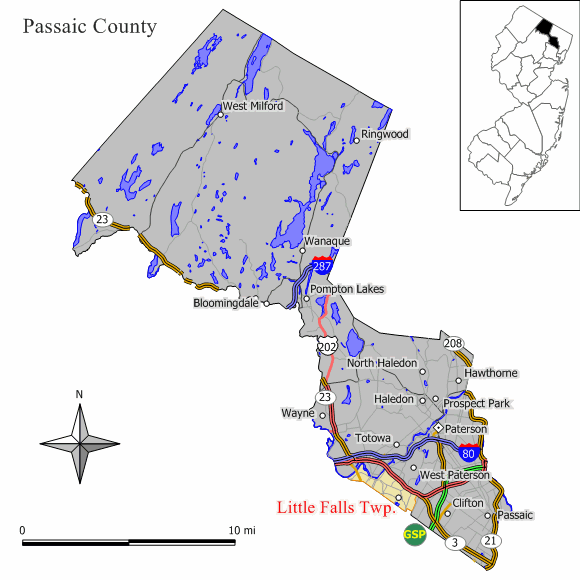
- Map of Little Falls in Passaic County; Singac is located in the western end of Little Falls. Inset: Location of Passaic County highlighted in the State of New Jersey.

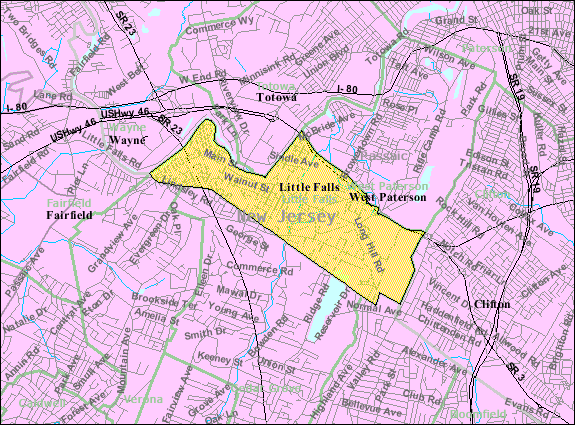
- Census Bureau map of Little Falls, New Jersey, in which Singac is located at its western end

- Location in Passaic County Location in New Jersey Location in the United States
- Coordinates: 40.884254°N 74.243539°W
- Country: United States
- State: New Jersey
- County: Passaic
- Township: Little Falls

Area
  - Total: 0.49 sq mi (1.27 km^{2})
  - Land: 0.46 sq mi (1.19 km^{2})
  - Water: 0.031 sq mi (0.08 km^{2}) 6.34%
- Elevation: 167 ft (51 m)

Population (2020)
  - Total: 3,602
  - Density: 7,840.9/sq mi (3,027.39/km^{2})
- Time zone: UTC−05:00 (Eastern (EST))
  - Summer (DST): UTC−04:00 (Eastern (EDT))
- ZIP Code: 07424
- Area codes: 862/973
- FIPS code: 34-67770
- GNIS feature ID: 02584027

Singac (pronounced SING-ack) is an unincorporated community and census-designated place (CDP) located within Little Falls, in Passaic County, in the U.S. state of New Jersey. As of the 2020 census, Singac had a population of 3,602.

The name Singac is believed to be an interpretation of the Lenape words meaning "backbone of mountain" or that it may originate from the Lenape term schinghacki meaning "flat country" or schingask meaning "boggy meadow", which alludes to how the area floods after a storm.

== Geography ==
According to the United States Census Bureau, the CDP had a total area of 0.498 square miles (1.289 km^{2}), including 0.466 square miles (1.207 km^{2}) of land and 0.032 square miles (0.082 km^{2}) of water (6.34%).

Singac is a neighborhood in the western end of Little Falls. It is bounded to the north by the Passaic River. New Jersey Route 23, known as the Newark-Pompton Turnpike or Pompton Avenue, runs north-south through the community.

== Economy ==
Mountain View Diners Company operated from 1939 to 1957, manufacturing prefabricated diners that were shipped nationwide.

== Demographics ==
Historical population
Census	Pop.	Note	%±
2010	3,618		—
2020	3,602		−0.4%
U.S. Decennial Census

Singac first appeared as a census designated place in the 2010 U.S. census formed from part of the deleted whole-township Little Falls CDP.

=== Racial and ethnic composition ===
Singac CDP, New Jersey – Racial and ethnic composition Note: the US Census treats Hispanic/Latino as an ethnic category. This table excludes Latinos from the racial categories and assigns them to a separate category. Hispanics/Latinos may be of any race.
Race / Ethnicity (NH = Non-Hispanic)	Pop 2010	Pop 2020	% 2010	% 2020
White alone (NH)	2,829	2,407	78.19%	66.82%
Black or African American alone (NH)	43	69	1.19%	1.92%
Native American or Alaska Native alone (NH)	5	1	0.14%	0.03%
Asian alone (NH)	209	195	5.78%	5.41%
Native Hawaiian or Pacific Islander alone (NH)	0	0	0.00%	0.00%
Other race alone (NH)	7	35	0.19%	0.97%
Mixed race or Multiracial (NH)	61	107	1.69%	2.97%
Hispanic or Latino (any race)	464	788	12.82%	21.88%
Total	3,618	3,602	100.00%	100.00%

=== 2020 census ===
As of the 2020 census, Singac had a population of 3,602. The median age was 40.7 years. 19.3% of residents were under the age of 18 and 15.5% of residents were 65 years of age or older. For every 100 females there were 95.4 males, and for every 100 females age 18 and over there were 94.6 males age 18 and over.

100.0% of residents lived in urban areas, while 0.0% lived in rural areas.

There were 1,450 households in Singac, of which 28.9% had children under the age of 18 living in them. Of all households, 42.8% were married-couple households, 20.1% were households with a male householder and no spouse or partner present, and 31.5% were households with a female householder and no spouse or partner present. About 31.2% of all households were made up of individuals and 11.9% had someone living alone who was 65 years of age or older.

There were 1,493 housing units, of which 2.9% were vacant. The homeowner vacancy rate was 0.7% and the rental vacancy rate was 3.0%.

=== 2010 census ===
The 2010 United States census counted 3,618 people, 1,477 households, and 920 families in the CDP. The population density was 7,763.6 per square mile (2,997.5/km^{2}). There were 1,545 housing units at an average density of 3,315.3 per square mile (1,280.0/km^{2}). The racial makeup was 88.00% (3,184) White, 1.35% (49) Black or African American, 0.14% (5) Native American, 5.80% (210) Asian, 0.00% (0) Pacific Islander, 2.65% (96) from other races, and 2.05% (74) from two or more races. Hispanic or Latino of any race were 12.82% (464) of the population.

Of the 1,477 households, 25.5% had children under the age of 18; 45.6% were married couples living together; 11.7% had a female householder with no husband present and 37.7% were non-families. Of all households, 31.5% were made up of individuals and 9.9% had someone living alone who was 65 years of age or older. The average household size was 2.45 and the average family size was 3.16.

19.5% of the population were under the age of 18, 7.7% from 18 to 24, 30.6% from 25 to 44, 27.7% from 45 to 64, and 14.5% who were 65 years of age or older. The median age was 40.1 years. For every 100 females, the population had 94.5 males. For every 100 females ages 18 and older there were 90.5 males.
