= Leesa Sleep =

American mattress company

Leesa Sleep, LLC (commonly known as Leesa) is an American direct-to-consumer mattress company in Virginia Beach, Virginia. It was founded in 2014. The company sells foam and hybrid mattresses, bedding and sleep accessories primarily through its website and through retail partners.

Founded by David Wolfe and Jamie Diamonstein, the company launched its first product in early 2015. Leesa raised $36.2 million in venture capital across multiple funding rounds before being acquired by 3Z Brands in March 2023.

In 2026, Leesa introduced a biofoam material into the construction of their mattresses. This replaced petroleum based foam with plant-based polyol foams, in an effect to use more eco-conscious materials into the construction of their mattresses. This foam is USDA BioPreferred certified.

== Business Model ==
Leesa was established as a direct-to-consumer (DTC) company, selling mattresses exclusively online. The company later expanded into physical retail through strategic partnerships. West Elm became Leesa's exclusive brick-and-mortar mattress partner in 2016, replacing Casper, which had previously held the partnership. A subsequent online partnership with Pottery Barn extended Leesa's reach within the broader William-Sonoma, Inc. portfolio.

== Acquisition by 3Z Brands (2023) ==
On March 15, 2023, Leesa was acquired by 3Z Brands, a vertically integrated multi-brad mattress company that also owns Helix Sleep, Birch Living, Brooklyn Bedding and Bear mattress. Following the acquisition, Leesa's manufacturing was consolidated at 3Z's facility in Glendale, Arizona.
