= Copia =

Copia may refer to:

- Copia Vineyards and Winery, a premium winery in Paso Robles, California
- Copia (or Copiae), the ancient city and bishopric also called Thurii or Thurium, now a Latin Catholic titular
- COPIA, a metal band from Melbourne, Australia
- Copia (Boeotia) (or Copae or Copiae), an ancient Greek city in Boeotia
- Copia: Foundations of the Abundant Style, a 1512 rhetorical guidebook by Desiderius Erasmus
- Copia: The American Center for Wine, Food & the Arts, the former museum in Napa, California
- The Culinary Institute of America at Copia, a branch campus of the culinary school
- Cornucopia, a symbol of abundance and nourishment
- Copia (album), a 2007 album by Eluvium
- A LTR-Retrotransposon, genetic element found in many animals and plants
- Cardinal Copia, the "fourth" lead singer of Swedish metal band, Ghost
- Jacques-Louis Copia (1764–1799), French engraver
- Isis Copia, pen name of May Ziadeh
