= West Elm =

Furniture store

West Elm, Inc.
- Company type: Subsidiary
- Industry: Consumer Retail
- Founded: 2002; 24 years ago Brooklyn, New York, U.S.
- Key people: Chuck Williams, Founder; Dale W. Hilpert, Founder; Laura Alber, CEO
- Products: Kitchenwares, Housewares, Office Furniture, Home Furnishings, Linens, Upholstery
- Parent: Williams-Sonoma
- Website: westelm.com

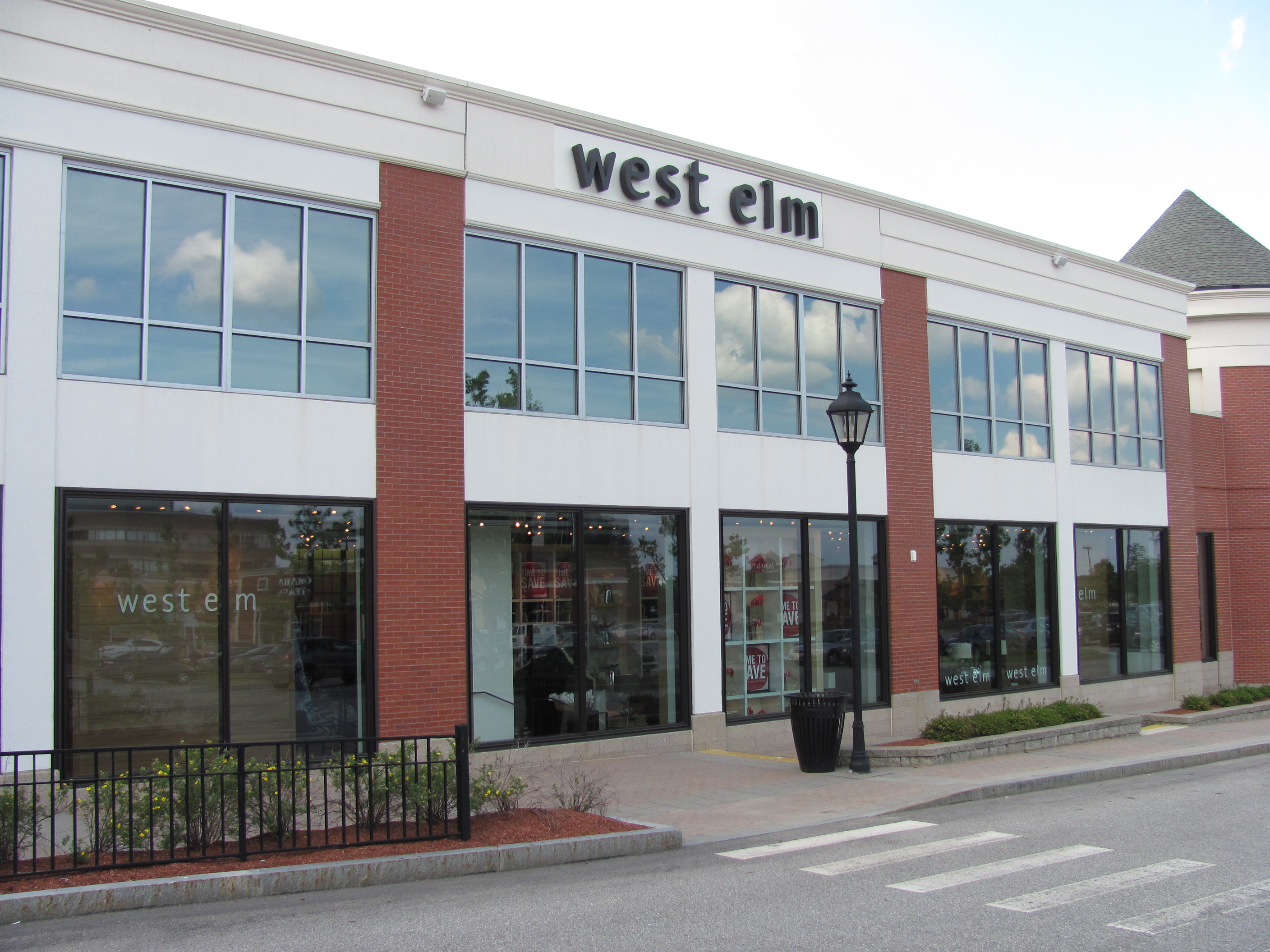
West Elm store in Burlington, Massachusetts, U.S.

West Elm (stylized as west elm) is a retail store that features contemporary furniture designs and other housewares. It is a wholly owned subsidiary of Williams-Sonoma, Inc. There are currently stores in the United States, Canada, Mexico, Australia, United Kingdom, Saudi Arabia, and India.

== History ==
The first West Elm stores outside the United States were opened in Canada. The Toronto King Liberty store opened in October 2008, Vancouver on the South Granville strip in September 2012, and Montreal at 995 Rue Wellington in June 2013, Calgary’s Mount Royal Village shopping centre Summer 2015.

In Mexico, El Puerto de Liverpool retail group operates the West Elm stores there, which number 10 as of January 2024.

In 2010, Jim Brett began as president and sought to "humanize" the products which he characterized as machine made and "soulless" to be more creative.

A growing concern was sustainability, such that by 2020 60% of the products were supporting one of the company's sustainability initiatives.

During 2019-20, West Elm was Williams-Sonoma's fastest growing brand. In 2020, West Elm committed to source at least 15% of their products from black-owned businesses and followed it up with a collection with a black woman.
