= Rejuvenation (disambiguation) =

Rejuvenation is a medical discipline focused on the practical reversal of the aging process.

Rejuvenation may also refer to:

- Rejuvenation (The Meters album), 1974
- Rejuvenation (Lonnie Liston Smith album), 1985
- Rejuvenation (Abstract Rude album), 2009
- Rejuvenation (Juvenile album), 2012
- Rejuvenation (company), an American manufacturer of light fixtures and hardware
- River rejuvenation
- Rejuvenation of packed red blood cells

== See also ==
- Rejuvenate!, a 1989 album by jazz saxophonist Ralph Moore
