= Lester Center for Entrepreneurship =

Berkeley-Haas Entrepreneurship Program
- Motto: Leading Through Innovation
- Type: Public
- Established: 1991
- Location: Berkeley, California, US
- Affiliations: Walter A. Haas School of Business at the University of California, Berkeley
- Website: entrepreneurship.berkeley.edu

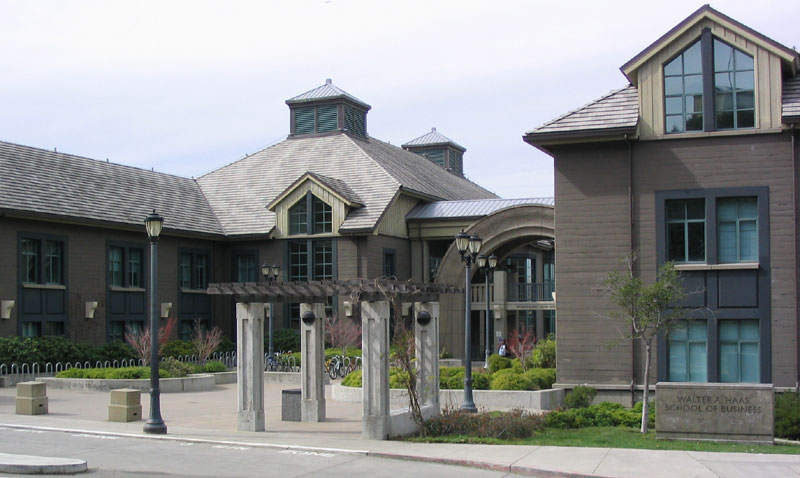
Eastern Entrance

The Berkeley-Haas Entrepreneurship Program is a program and the primary locus for the study and promotion of entrepreneurship and new enterprise development at the University of California Berkeley. The offices are located in the Faculty Building of the Haas School of Business at the University of California, Berkeley.

== History ==
The Berkeley-Haas Entrepreneurship Program was founded in 1991 through a gift from the late W. Howard Lester, chairman of Williams-Sonoma, Inc.

== Speaker series ==
The Berkeley-Haas Entrepreneurship Program sponsors three speaker series, two of which are open to members of the community as well as students, faculty and staff:

- UC Berkeley Entrepreneurs Forum – Presentations held twice a semester during the academic year featuring a networking hour followed by a presentation on a topic of interest to entrepreneurs, venture capitalists and members of supporting professional organizations.
- Entrepreneurial Best Practices Series – Events designed to help entrants to the UC Berkeley Startup Competition and the Global Social Venture Competition develop their business ideas.
- A. Richard Newton Distinguished Innovator Lecture Series/Life as an Entrepreneur Series – Events featuring distinguished entrepreneurs from organizations at various stages of development and representing a broad range of industries. Entrepreneurs talk about how their organizations were created and share the lessons they learned. This speaker series is only open to students.

== Notable alumni ==
John Hanke, MBA '96 – Hanke founded Keyhole, Inc., which eventually became Google Earth.
Peter Vlastelica and Jack Kloster, both MBA '06- Vlastelica and Kloster founded Yardbarker, which aims to be the main social website for sports fans, players and others.
Danae Ringelmann and Eric Schell, both MBA '08- The two, along with Slava Rubin, founded Indiegogo, a crowdfunding platform for all creative, cause, and entrepreneurial projects.
Brett Wilson and John Hughes, MBA '07 – The two entrepreneurs founded TubeMogul, a programmatic advertising platform for video advertising, and won the 2007 Bplan competition. The company went public on the NASDAQ (TUBE) in 2014 and was acquired by Adobe in 2017 for $540 million.
