= Laura J. Alber =

American businesswoman (born 1968)

Laura Alber
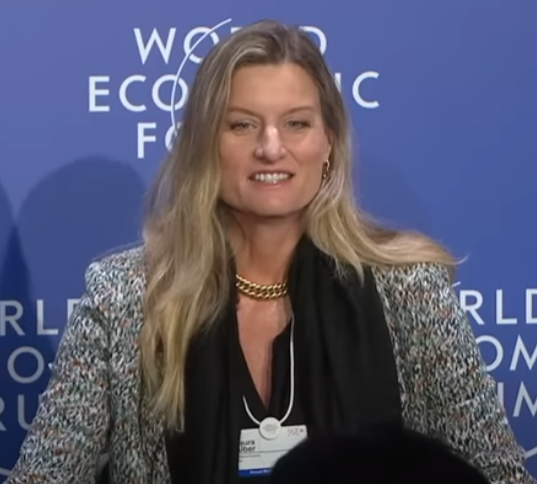
- Speaking at the 2023 World Economic Forum
- Born: 1968 (age 57–58)
- Education: University of Pennsylvania; University of Edinburgh
- Occupation: Business Executive
- Known for: CEO, Williams-Sonoma, Inc.

Laura J. Alber (born 1968) is an American businesswoman, who in 2010, became the CEO of Williams-Sonoma, Inc.

== Early life and education ==
Alber earned a B.A. in psychology from the University of Pennsylvania. While attending Penn, Alber had a small business selling velvet floppy hats. After graduation from Penn, Alber drove to California with no plan and took a series of odd jobs until taking an entry-level job at Gap Inc.

== Career ==
Alber joined Williams-Sonoma in 1995 as a senior buyer in the Pottery Barn subsidiary brand. She then served as director of the Pottery Barn catalog and later became president of Pottery Barn, serving from 2002 to 2006.

Alber moved to the newly created role of president of Williams-Sonoma in 2006, where she continued her lead of Pottery Barn and the company's global supply chain, distribution, and worldwide logistics.

In 2010, Alber was elected to the company's board and named as CEO, replacing retiring W. Howard Lester. In September 2011, she was ranked the 10th highest paid woman in U.S. business by Fortune magazine, with an estimated compensation of $13,555,412.

Alber has said she enjoys the intellectual challenge of understanding the changing trends and global influences on the home. After being pregnant with her first daughter, Alber said she was inspired to create Pottery Barn Kids, providing home furnishings for children's spaces. Alber also led the creation of the Pottery Barn Bed+Bath, PBteen, and Threads brands. In 2011, the San Francisco Business Times named her one of the most influential women in San Francisco.

In 2014, under Alber's leadership, Williams-Sonoma became one of the largest U.S. e-tailers, selling about half of its $5 billion annual sales online. During her tenure, Williams-Sonoma launched its first app — "Recipe of the Day" — and partnered with YouTube to offer shoppable online videos. In 2014 and 2015, Fortune magazine named Alber a "Business Person of the Year."

=== Appearances ===
Alber is on the board of overseers for the University of Pennsylvania College of Arts & Sciences. She and her husband also created the Alber-Klingelhofer Endowed Scholarship at Penn. In 2014, Alber was the graduation speaker at the College of Arts and Sciences at the University of Pennsylvania, where she encouraged "present mindedness", which she defined as focusing on doing what you love, rather than only planning for it.

Alber became a member of the board of directors of Fitbit in 2016 until Google acquired the company. She is also a member of The Business Council and she was a member of the advisory board of the Richardson Bay Audubon Center.

Alber joined the board of Salesforce in November 2021. In 2023, she was named on Fortune's list of Most Powerful Women.

== Personal life ==
Alber is married with three children.
