= The Culinary Institute of America at Copia =

Culinary classes and event venue in Napa, California

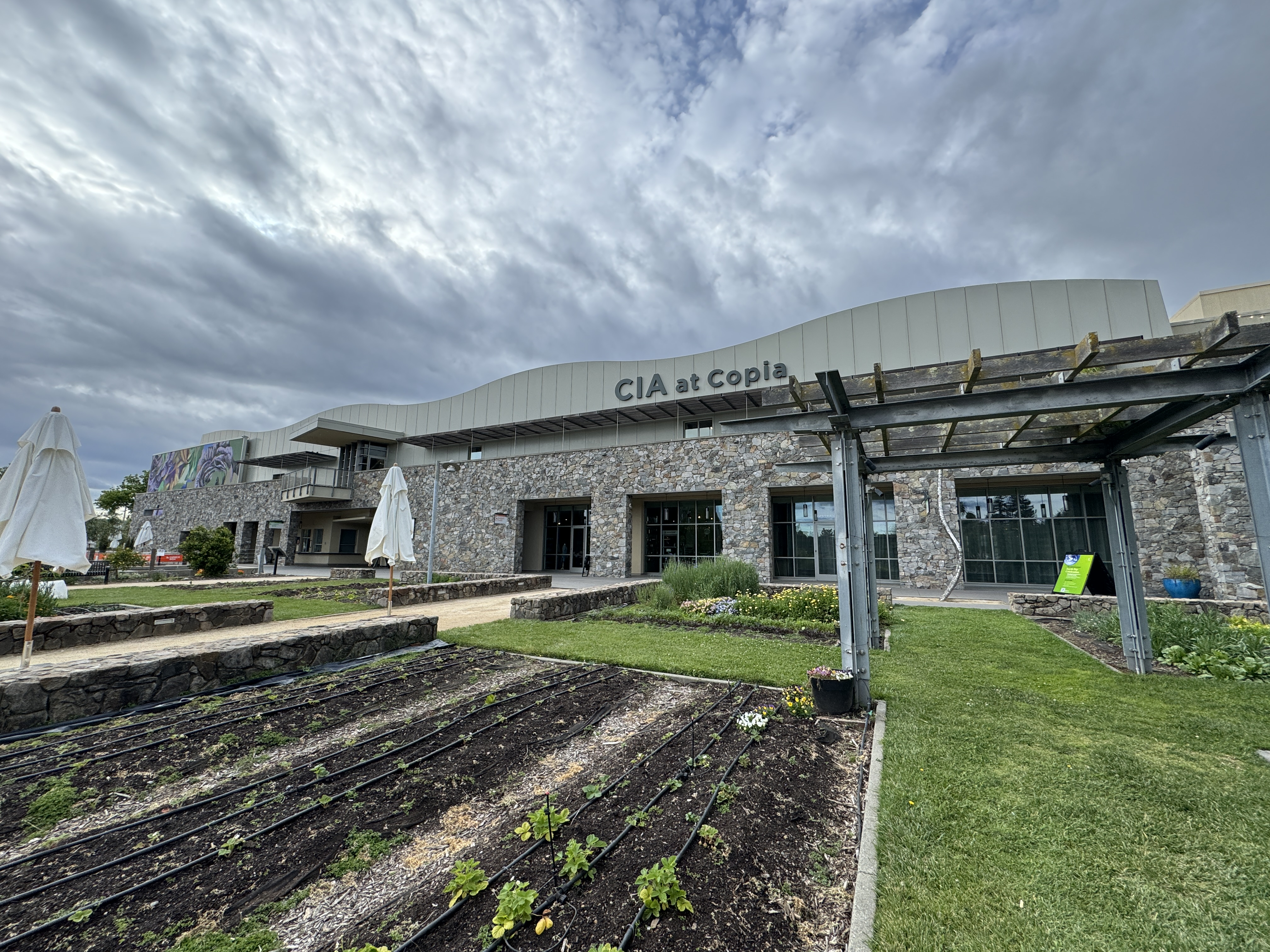
- Other names: The CIA at Copia
- Type: Private
- Established: 2016
- Location: 500 First Street, Napa, California, U.S. 38.302800°N 122.280314°W
- Campus: Suburban, 12 acres (4.9 ha)
- Website: Official website

The Culinary Institute of America at Copia is a branch campus of the private culinary college the Culinary Institute of America. The CIA at Copia, located adjacent to the Oxbow Public Market in downtown Napa, California, opened its doors in 2016. The CIA venue provides food- and wine-related courses to visitors. The CIA at Copia and The Culinary Institute of America at Greystone make up the school's California branch.

The Copia campus was acquired by the Culinary Institute of America in 2015. The building and grounds were formerly Copia, a museum in downtown Napa that operated from 2001 to 2008. The campus opened in 2016 as the Culinary Institute of America at Copia, and houses the CIA's new Food Business School, as well as its Accelerated Culinary Arts Program and Culinary Boot Camps.

== School facilities ==
The Copia building totals 78,632 square feet (7,305.2 m^{2}), and the property includes an outdoor amphitheater with seating for 1,000 and a variety of outdoor gardens. It has a 250-seat theater, the Theater at Copia, used for lectures and the primary location for the Napa Valley Film Festival, and also the site for food and wine industry conferences and community events. The college offers additional hands-on classes in Copia's teaching kitchens, and has a 72-seat theater, the Napa Valley Vintners Theater, which hosts daily food and wine classes and an ongoing series of demonstrations by instructors and visiting culinary, wine, and beverage experts. The theater can also be booked for a meeting or private event. CIA's Accelerated Culinary Arts Program, known as "ACAP," is housed at Copia as well, offering a one-year certificate in Culinary Arts.

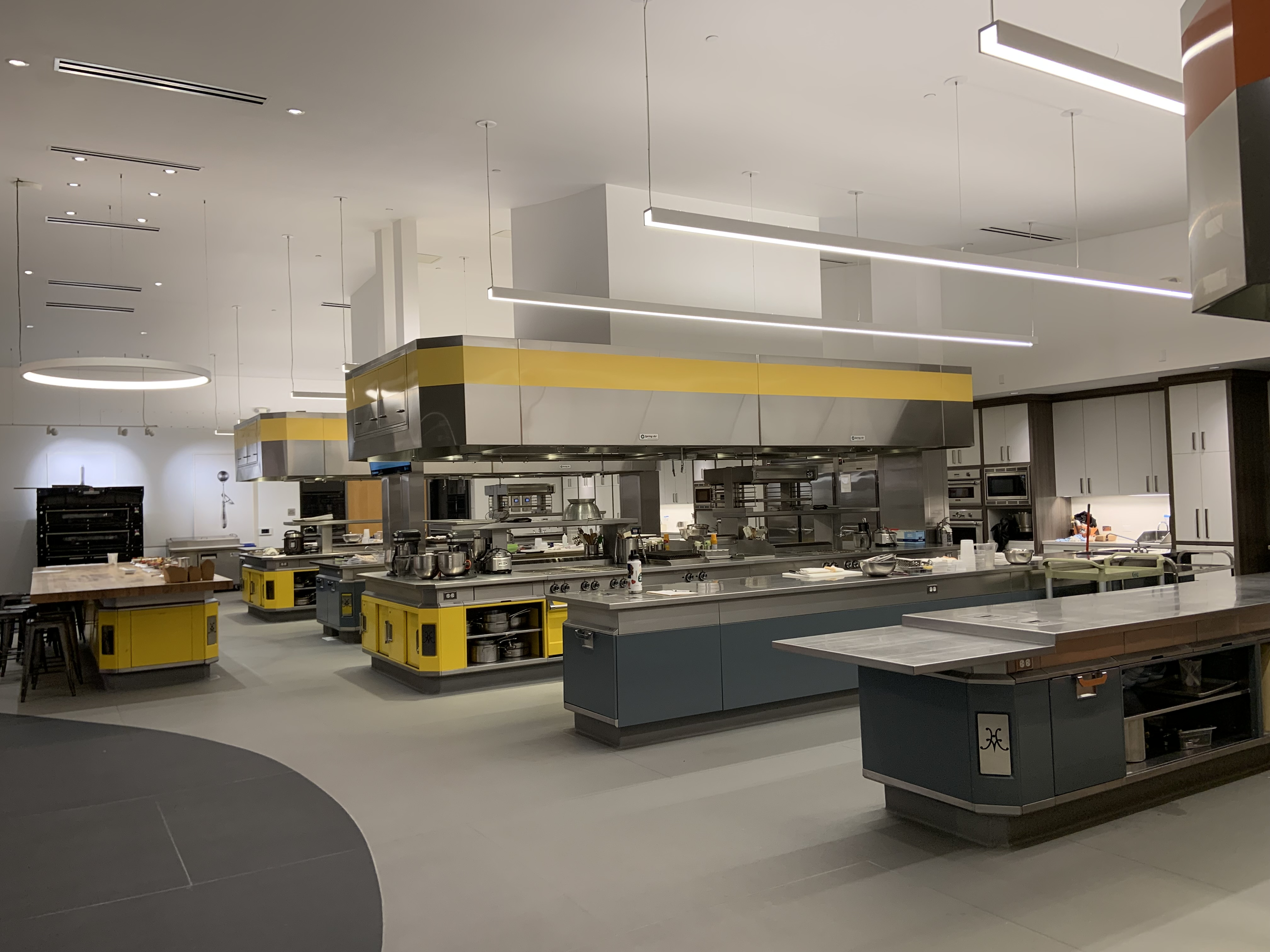
CIA at Copia's primary kitchen

The building has a 90-seat restaurant, which was formerly Julia's Kitchen, a Julia Child-themed restaurant that operated while Copia existed as a museum. The Restaurant at CIA Copia focuses on serving shared plates served tableside by CIA chefs. Dishes are inspired by the Napa Valley harvest and CIA gardens, and paired with cocktails or wines. Three private dining rooms are available as well. Copia also offers Grove, a casual outdoor patio with a wood-burning oven and bar. There is an on-site retail store with linens, pottery created by local artists, cookware and bakeware, items for the home and garden, books, knives, glassware, and other related items. The store occasionally hosts in-store demonstrations and book signings.

The CIA at Copia also contains a reserve wine collection, which holds a collection of rare and fine wines, and the Chuck Williams Culinary Arts Museum, which includes about 4,000 culinary artifacts.

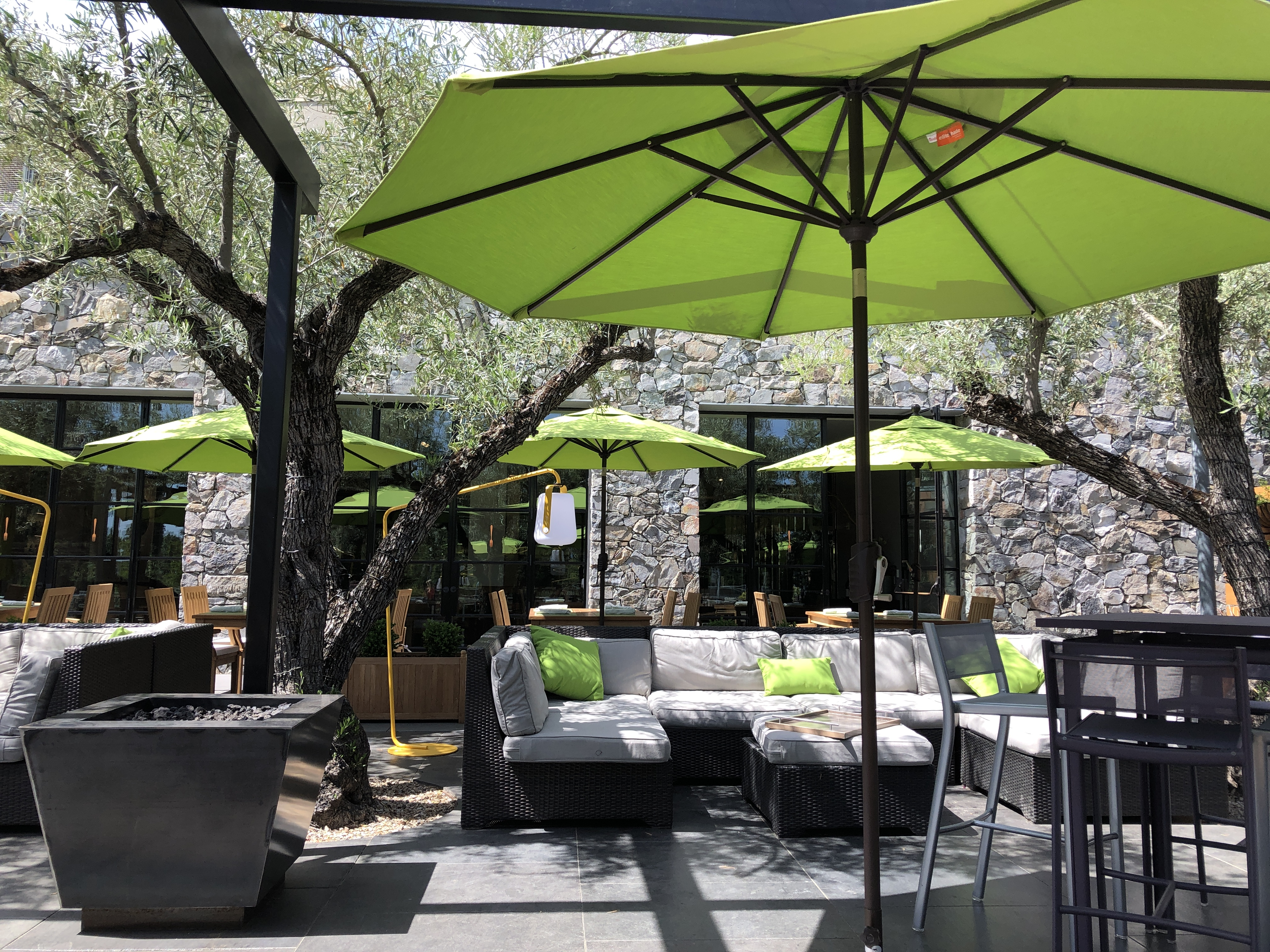
Grove, the campus's outdoor, seasonal restaurant

== Programs ==
The CIA at Copia's theaters offer cooking, beverage, and lecture-style events for the public, and is publicly available for special and private events, including lectures, dinners, concerts, and weddings. Copia also holds professional conferences and seminars throughout the year, including the Worlds of Flavor International Conference & Festival.
