= Rejuvenation (company) =

American manufacturing company

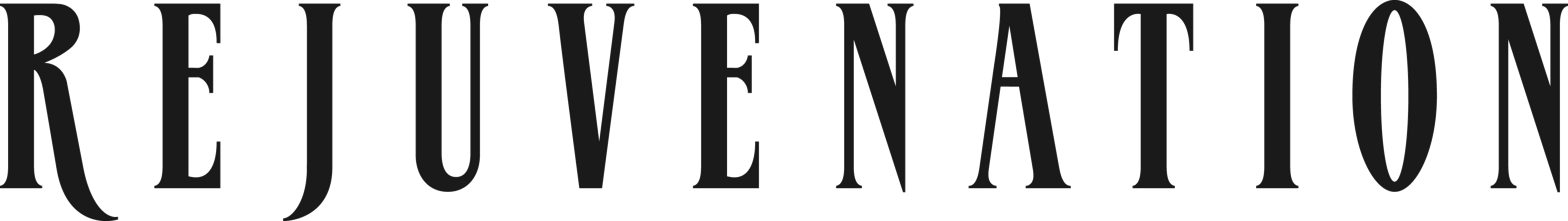
- Type: Subsidiary
- Industry: Custom manufacturing, Retail
- Founded: 1977; 49 years ago
- Founder: Jim Kelly
- Headquarters: Portland, Oregon, U.S.
- Key people: Jim Kelly, Founder; Alysa Rose, President
- Products: Lighting Hardware
- Number of employees: 240
- Parent: Williams-Sonoma, Inc.
- Website: rejuvenation.com

Rejuvenation is an American manufacturer and direct marketer of light fixtures and hardware. The company manufactures most of their lighting in Portland, Oregon. Williams-Sonoma, Inc. acquired the company in November 2011.

== History ==
The company began in 1977 as an architectural salvage shop in a former saloon in North Portland. The founder, Jim Kelly, began the business with $1,000 and his interest in architectural salvage. When business was slow, Kelly would restore vintage light fixtures to working order.

As demand for the fixtures grew, Kelly began manufacturing reproduction vintage lighting in a Portland factory and selling it nationally through a mail-order catalog. A website was added in 1997, followed by a store in Seattle in 2004, and a Los Angeles store located in the Helms Bakery buildings in late 2011, along with a Berkeley store in 2012. Rejuvenation was acquired by Williams-Sonoma in 2011.

Rejuvenation is a major U.S. manufacturer of reproduction lighting and house parts. The company has declared a commitment to green manufacturing and support for livable communities.
