= Helix Sleep =

American mattress company

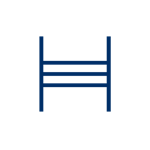
- Type: Private
- Industry: Mattresses
- Founded: January 5, 2015; 11 years ago
- Founders: Jerry Lin; Kristian von Rickenbach; Adam Tishman
- Headquarters: New York City, New York, U.S.
- Area served: United States, Canada
- Products: Mattresses
- Website: helixsleep.com

Helix Sleep is a privately held, U.S.-based company selling mattresses and other bedding accessories. The company is headquartered in New York City. Its mattresses are manufactured at the company's factory in Phoenix, Arizona, and the company ships to the United States and most of Canada.

== History ==
Helix Sleep was founded by Jerry Lin, Kristian von Rickenbach, and Adam Tishman in 2015. On August 4, 2015, the Helix Sleep website was launched. Prior to the launch, the company raised a seed round investment from angel investors.

Helix Sleep raised Series A funding in August 2016. The company launched the Birch by Helix brand in May 2019. The Allform modular sofa brand was launched in May 2020. Allform closed its online store on March 28, 2025.

In 2021, Helix Sleep merged with Brooklyn Bedding in partnership with Cerberus Capital Management. In January 2023, the combined company adopted the corporate name 3Z Brands, encompassing Helix Sleep, Brooklyn Bedding, Birch, Bear Mattress, and their wholesale operations. In 2023, 3Z acquired Nolah Sleep and Leesa. In December 2024, 3Z acquired Southerland, a Nashville-based manufacturer that sells to brick-and-mortar retailers through four factories. In 2025, 3Z announced the closure of the former Southerland plant in Tualatin, Oregon, and a 250,000-square-foot expansion of its main Phoenix factory.

== Products ==
The Helix Sleep brand gives customers a questionnaire to learn about their height and weight, how they sleep, and how firm their mattresses usually are and uses that data to match users to a mattress.

Helix's mattresses are designed and assembled at 3Z's manufacturing facility in Phoenix, Arizona. and Tennessee.

Helix operates primarily as a direct-to-consumer e-commerce brand, selling through its website. Helix mattresses are also sold in showrooms and select retailers across the US.

Helix's Midnight Luxe, Twilight Luxe, and Plus mattresses have been endorsed by the American Chiropractic Association.

From 2023 to 2026, the Helix Midnight Luxe has been Wired magazine's Best Mattress Overall.

From 2024 to 2026, the Helix Midnight Luxe was ranked Best Mattress Overall by Forbes.

In 2025, the Helix Midnight Elite won the Oprah Sleep Award for Best Hotel-Like Feel.

In 2026, USA Today included Helix in its "Most Trusted Brands" list, a consumer-survey ranking compiled with Plant-A Insights Group.

== See also ==
- Memory foam
- Microcoil
- Polyform
