= Williams Sonoma =

American homewares store chain

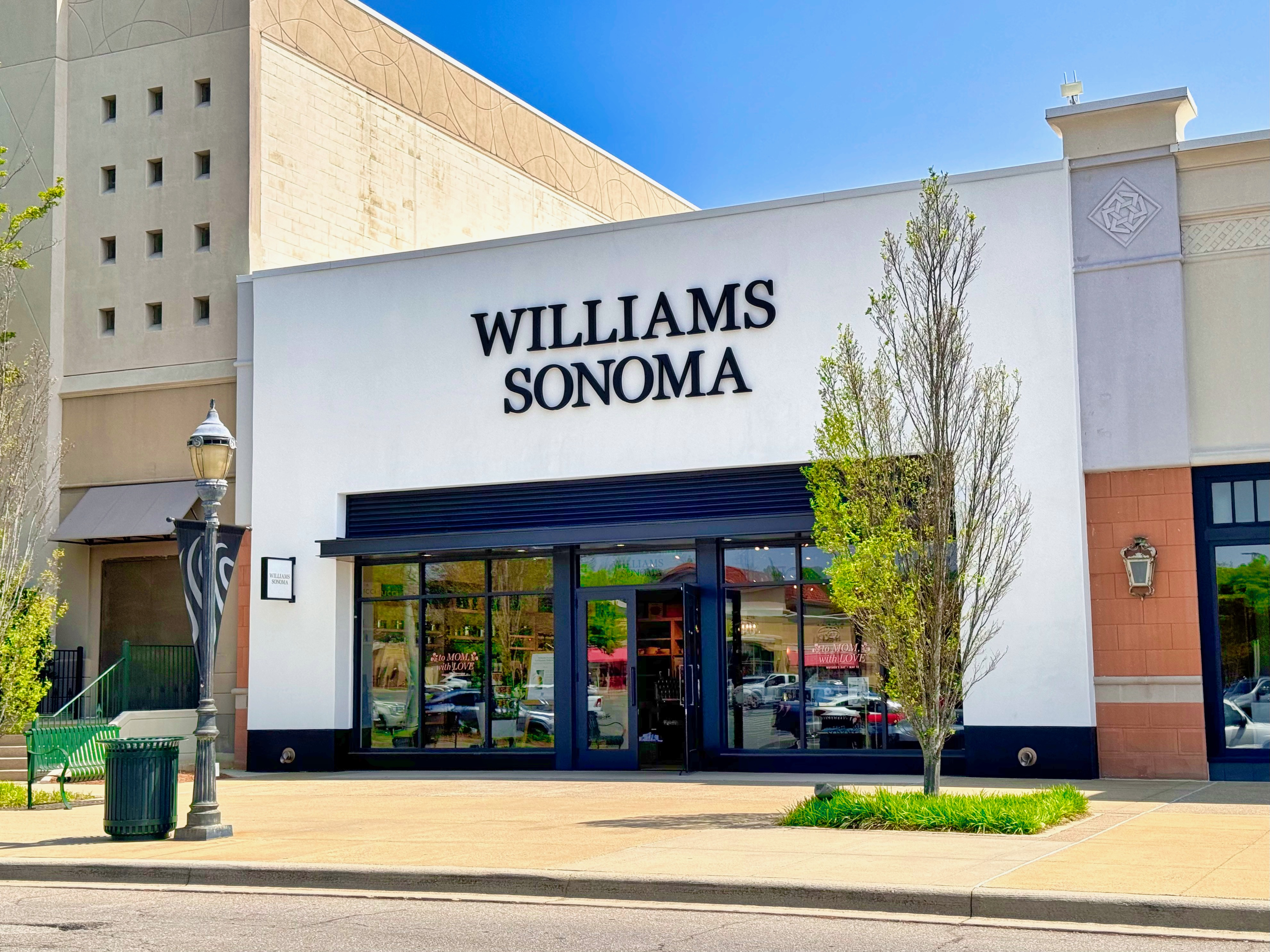
- Williams Sonoma at The Summit (Alabama)
- Type: Subsidiary
- Industry: Retail, e-commerce
- Founded: September 15, 1956; 70 years ago
- Founders: Charles E. Williams
- Number of locations: (230)
- Area served: Worldwide
- Products: Home furnishings, Specialty cookware, Kitchen appliances, Specialty food
- Parent: Williams-Sonoma, Inc.
- Website: www.williams-sonoma.com

Williams Sonoma is an American retailer of cookware, appliances, and home furnishings. It is owned by Williams-Sonoma, Inc., and was founded by Charles E. (Chuck) Williams in 1956.

== History ==
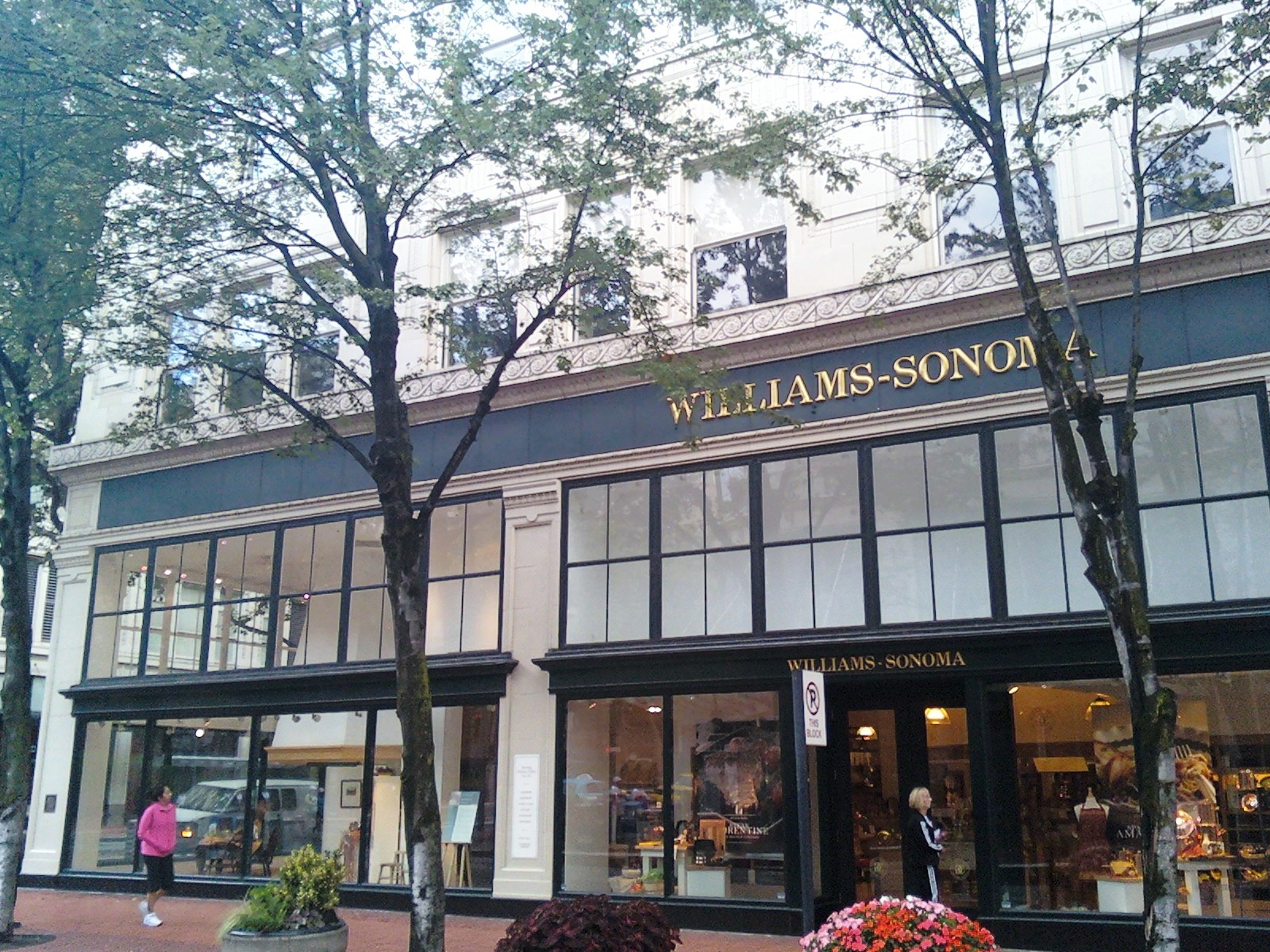
Williams Sonoma store - Portland, Oregon

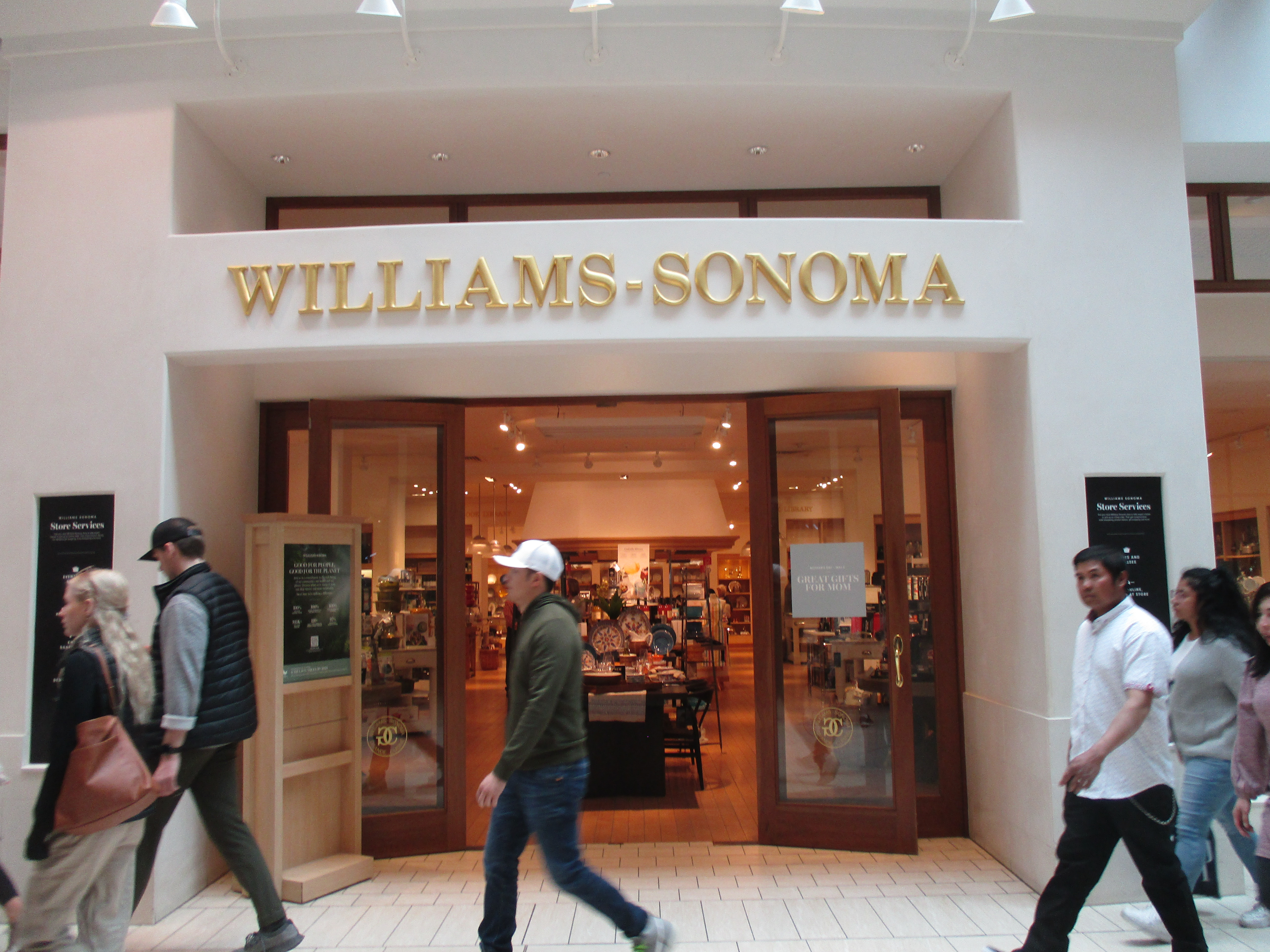
Williams-Sonoma in Calgary

In 1947, Chuck Williams settled in Sonoma, California, and opened his first shop as a hardware store. In 1953, Williams took his first trip to France, where he was impressed by the quality of French kitchenware such as copper cookware, and is quoted as saying, "I knew this was something that wasn't found in America, but thought people would want." Shortly after returning home, he formulated a plan to import French cooking and serving equipment into America and eventually converted his store into a cookware shop in 1956. Thus, Williams Sonoma was founded, selling professional and restaurant-quality kitchenware for home use, leading to founder Chuck Williams being recognized as one of the titans of the American food revolution.

After customer requests, Williams relocated the store to San Francisco in 1958. The store quickly became a destination with culinary figures such as Julia Child and James Beard becoming customers of the flagship location. In 1972, along with—and at the suggestion of—regular customer Jackie Mallorca, Williams began publishing a mail order catalog to expand his business beyond the San Francisco Bay Area. At the suggestion of customer and friend Edward Marcus, of Dallas-based Neiman Marcus, Williams decided to expand the company and formed the corporation, Williams-Sonoma, Inc., in 1972.

The second Williams Sonoma store opened on Rodeo Drive in Beverly Hills in 1973. The same year, Williams Sonoma introduced the Cuisinart food processor to the American market through its stores and catalog. Williams decided to sell his share of the company in 1978 to W. Howard Lester, an Oklahoma entrepreneur, and businessman James McMahan. Williams maintained an ownership interest and guided the selection of merchandise and the production of the catalog. Lester took an active role as president and chief executive, while McMahan was the company director. At the time, Williams Sonoma had revenues of $4 million.

The company partnered with Time-Life Books in 1992 to release its first series of Williams Sonoma Kitchen Library cookbooks. In 1999, Williams Sonoma launched an e-commerce website and bridal registry.

In 2004, Williams Sonoma entered into an agreement with the CBS News weekday program The Early Show to broadcast a segment, "The 5-Minute Cooking School", which presented cooking techniques, styles, and recipes. The special weekly series was televised from Williams Sonoma's East Coast flagship store at The Shops at Columbus Circle in New York City's Time Warner Center. This was followed by the debut of upscale Williams Sonoma Home in 2005.

Williams Sonoma opened a store at the site of its original location in Sonoma, California, in 2014. Williams Sonoma founder Chuck Williams celebrated his 99th birthday on the store's opening on October 2, 2014.

== In popular culture ==
Williams Sonoma's stores and gift registries have been referenced on television shows including Sex and the City (Season 1, Episode 3: "Bay of Married Pigs"), American Dad! (Season 2, Episode 16: "When a Stan Loves a Woman"), Dr. Katz, Professional Therapist (Season 6, Episode 7: "Used Car"), Frasier, Mike Tyson Mysteries, Friends (Season 5, Episode 4: "The One Where Phoebe Hates PBS"), The Office (American TV series) (Season 8, Episode 9: "Mrs. California"), The Simpsons (Season 31, Episode 8: "Thanksgiving of Horror"), and Family Guy (Season 19, Episode 13: "PeTerminator").

Williams Sonoma products have been featured numerous times on The Oprah Winfrey Show's Oprah's Favorite Things specials including Williams Sonoma Home bedding (2004), Williams Sonoma's croissants (2002, 2005, and 2010), Williams Sonoma's melamine mixing bowls, measuring cups, and measuring spoons (2007), Perfect Ending Cupcakes and Breville's Ikon Panini Press (sold by Williams Sonoma) (2007), and Williams Sonoma's Waring Popcorn Maker (2014).

In the film The Muse, all the kitchen supplies used to manufacture the wives' cookies were purchased at Williams Sonoma. In the musical Dear Edwina, one song references "Williams" and "Sonoma" as being people that sing along with the Fairy Forkmother to teach a chef how to set a table.
