= W. Howard Lester =

- Born: August 14, 1935; Durant, Oklahoma
- Died: November 15, 2010 (aged 75); Indian Wells, California
- Known for: Co-owner, CEO, Chairman of Williams-Sonoma

W. Howard Lester (August 14, 1935 – November 15, 2010) was an American businessman who took over Williams-Sonoma, Inc. in 1976 and acquired Pottery Barn in 1986, building a major catalog retailer that had more than 600 stores and annual sales of $3.4 billion by the time of his death.

== Biography ==
Lester was born on August 14, 1935, in Durant, Oklahoma, and worked in a series of jobs before enrolling at the University of Oklahoma. He dropped out of college and was drafted and served in the United States Army; he completed his degree after leaving military service.

Following a series of careers, including working for IBM, Lester founded an employment agency. By 1976, he built and sold a computer software company he had established and was looking for another prospective business opportunity. A friend told him about Williams-Sonoma, and Lester analyzed the business for months in detail. The company had been established in 1956 in Sonoma, California, and had grown to four stores. Its catalog business had grown substantially under the guidance of Edward Marcus, and the firm's founder Chuck Williams was looking to move on after Marcus died in 1976. Lester said, "I felt like I could run it better," and together with his partner James McMahan bought the company for $100,000 and the assumption of $700,000 in debt, at that point the company was generating around $4 million in annual revenue. Lester worked as the company's chief executive officer and initially focused on building the company's catalog sales. He focused on finding prime locations in malls starting in the 1980s at a pace of five new stores per year. Lester used his computer expertise to oversee the design of a database that tracked the buying habits of its 4.5 million customers. In 1986, Lester acquired Pottery Barn, a division of Gap that had sales of $6 million within its 25 stores. Lester stepped down as the company's chairman in the months before his death, by which time Williams-Sonoma and its network of catalogs had grown to 600 stores and annual sales of $3.4 billion.

Lester's contributions helped create the Lester Center for Entrepreneurship at the University of California, Berkeley's Haas School of Business.

A resident of Indian Wells, California, Lester died at the age of 75 on November 15, 2010, due to cancer. He was buried at the Mountain Cemetery in Sonoma, Sonoma County, California.
