= Chuck Williams (author) =

American businessperson and food writer (1915–2015)

- Born: Charles Edward Williams; October 2, 1915; Jacksonville, Florida, U.S.
- Died: December 5, 2015 (aged 100); San Francisco, California, U.S.
- Occupations: Businessperson, author

Charles Edward Williams (October 2, 1915 – December 5, 2015) was the American founder of Williams Sonoma and author and editor of more than 100 books on the subject of cooking. Williams is credited for playing a major role in introducing French cookware into American kitchens through his retail and mail-order business. He became a centenarian in October 2015 and died two months later on December 5, 2015, in San Francisco, California.

== Early life ==
Born in 1915 in Jacksonville, Florida, Williams learned to cook from his maternal grandmother, who had owned a restaurant in Lima, Ohio. When the Great Depression hit, his father's auto repair business failed, and the family moved to southern California. His father fared no better there and soon abandoned his wife, son, and daughter. Eventually, Williams found work on a date farm near Palm Springs, Sniff's Date Gardens in Indio. The couple who owned it, Dana and Abagail Sniff, took him in and drove him to high school in the mornings while he spent the afternoons working at the date shop and grounds. Williams lived with the Sniffs for seven years until just after his graduation from high school. His sister died in 1933 from a brain injury, after being hit in the head with a baseball. His mother returned to Florida, and Williams finished school and moved to Los Angeles.

During World War II, he spent four years overseas as an airplane mechanic for Lockheed International, working on aircraft in India and East Africa. After the war, Williams returned to Los Angeles and visited Sonoma with friends for a weekend golf trip; drawn to the town, he relocated there in 1947 and established a building contracting business.

Williams was a Freemason.

== Williams-Sonoma ==
Williams bought the Ralph Morse Hardware Store in Sonoma, California, in 1953. Over the next few years, he gradually converted its stock from hardware to French cookware, filling a niche in the market as European cookware was difficult to find for purchase in America at the time. The concept was successful, and he moved his operations to San Francisco in 1958. More than a decade later, in 1971, Williams-Sonoma introduced its first mail-order cookware catalog. Soon after, the business began expanding to more locations and grew to over 600 stores nationwide by 2015. Chuck Williams sold Williams-Sonoma to Howard Lester and Jay McMahan in 1978 for $800,000 ($100,000 in cash and the assumption of $700,000 of debt.) He served as chairman of the company until 1986, and he remained extensively involved with the company, overseeing merchandise selection, conducting public appearances, and writing cookbooks, for the remainder of his life. The company went public on the New York Stock Exchange in 1983.

== Contributions to cooking ==
Williams operated a test kitchen at Williams-Sonoma corporate headquarters in San Francisco, where recipes are tested for the company's catalogs and cookbooks. He was an editor or contributor to nearly every cookbook that Williams-Sonoma has thus far released, including the large multi-volume Williams-Sonoma Kitchen Library set, co-published by Time-Life Books. The series includes over 40 volumes and has sold nearly 10 million copies. Williams was the sole author of another Time-Life/Williams Sonoma series, Simple Cooking, which comprised Simple American Cooking, Simple French Cooking, and Simple Italian Cooking, as well as a "best of" collection with selections from all three. All told, Williams was involved with the production of more than 100 cookbooks that have sold over 100 million copies worldwide.

He also initiated scholarships for promising students in the field of culinary arts through several organizations, including the Culinary Institute of America. In addition to his involvement with The Culinary Institute of America, Williams served on the board of the American Institute of Food & Wine and had contributed to events offered by the International Association of Culinary Professionals (IACP). He was named in the "Who's Who of Food & Beverage" in 1994 by the James Beard Foundation, and was given the Foundation's highest recognition, the Lifetime Achievement Award, in 1995. Williams was inducted into the Halls of Fame for the Culinary Institute of America and the Direct Marketing Association.

== Philanthropy ==
After Williams' death, his estate donated Williams' nearly 4,000-piece collection of cookware to create the Chuck Williams Culinary Arts Museum, operated by the Culinary Institute of America.
